= ER season 5 =

ER
- Season 5
- DVD cover
- Starring: Anthony Edwards; George Clooney; Noah Wyle; Julianna Margulies; Gloria Reuben; Laura Innes; Alex Kingston; Kellie Martin; Eriq La Salle
- No. of episodes: 22

Release
- Original network: NBC
- Original release: September 24, 1998 – May 20, 1999

Season chronology
- ← Previous; Season 4 Next → Season 6

The fifth season of the American fictional drama television series ER first aired on NBC on September 24, 1998, and concluded on May 20, 1999. The fifth season consists of 22 episodes.

== Plot ==
Medical student Lucy Knight (Kellie Martin) begins her studies in the ER. As she spends time learning the layout and staff of the ER, we learn of Dr. Anna Del Amico's departure. Carter is reminded of himself as he watches Knight learn and practice. The two have a large number of conflicts before they find a way to work together. Elizabeth Corday begins her surgical internship all over again in order to keep her job at the hospital, and ends her relationship with fellow surgeon Peter Benton. Benton finds out that his son is hearing impaired, and he considers a cochlear implant. Eventually, he decides against it. Kerry Weaver applies for a full-time chief of emergency medicine post, but the post goes to an East Coast doctor, Amanda Lee. Dr. Lee soon develops a more-than-professional interest in Mark Greene with Lee being revealed to be a fraudulent psychopath who later leaves under cloudy circumstances.

Greene does a paramedic ride-along, and Doug Ross has at last settled down with Carol Hathaway. While on probation after performing a risky procedure during the fourth season, Ross breaks protocol again by informing a mother how to alter the medication given to her disabled son. She uses this information to kill her son, leaving Ross under fire. He resigns and moves to Seattle. A short time later, Carol discovers that she is pregnant with twins. Greene and Corday's friendship progresses, and they begin a romance.

== Production ==
Original executive producers John Wells and Michael Crichton reprised their roles. Lydia Woodward, Carol Flint, and Christopher Chulack all returned as executive producers. Flint left the crew with the close of the fifth season. Co-executive producer Walon Green returned for the fifth season but left the series mid-season. Fourth season producer Neal Baer and fourth season co-producer Jack Orman were promoted to supervising producers for the fifth season. Fourth season producer Penny Adams and co-producers Wendy Spence Rosato, Richard Thorpe, and Michael Salamunovich all returned to their roles. Spence Rosato was promoted to producer mid-season. Fourth season executive story editor Samantha Howard Corbin was promoted to co-producer for the fifth season but left the crew mid-season. She was replaced as co-producer by regular director Jonathan Kaplan.

Producers Wells, Woodward, Flint, Baer, Orman, Corbin, and Greene continued to write episodes. Wells wrote two episodes, Woodward wrote four episodes, and Flint wrote five episodes. Baer wrote two episodes, Orman wrote three episodes, and Corbin and Greene each contributed to one episode before their departure. Regular writer and previous technical advisor Joe Sachs was promoted to story editor for the fifth season and contributed to two episodes. Former producers David Mills and Paul Manning continued to write for the series, Mills contributed to two further episodes, and Manning scripted one more episode. Fourth season writer Linda Gase returned and contributed to two more episodes. New writer Christopher Mack wrote a single episode.

Producers Chulack and Kaplan served as the seasons regular directors. Chulack helmed five episodes and Kaplan directed four. Cinematographer and co-producer Thorpe directed a further episode. Regular directors Lesli Linka Glatter, Félix Enríquez Alcalá, and Rod Holcomb all returned to direct further episodes. Other returning directors include executive producer John Wells, Christopher Misiano, David Nutter, and T.R. Babu Subramaniam. Cast member Laura Innes made her series directing debut with a fifth-season episode. Other new directors were Steve De Jarnatt and Dave Chameides, each with a single episode.

== Cast ==
=== Main cast ===
- Anthony Edwards as Dr. Mark Greene – Attending Emergency Physician
- George Clooney as Dr. Doug Ross – Attending ER Pediatrician (episodes 1–15)
- Noah Wyle as Dr. John Carter – Second-year ER Resident
- Julianna Margulies as Carol Hathaway – RN and Nurse Manager
- Gloria Reuben as Jeanie Boulet – Physician Assistant
- Laura Innes as Dr. Kerry Weaver – Attending Emergency Physician
- Alex Kingston as Dr. Elizabeth Corday – Surgical Intern
- Kellie Martin as Lucy Knight – Third-year Rotating Medical Student
- Eriq La Salle as Dr. Peter Benton – Trauma/Surgical Fellow

=== Supporting cast ===
Doctors and medical students

- Mare Winningham as Amanda Lee – Chief of Emergency Medicine
- Sam Anderson as Dr. Jack Kayson – Chief of Cardiology
- John Aylward as Dr. Donald Anspaugh – Chief of Staff
- Paul McCrane as Dr. Robert Romano – Chief of Surgery
- Jorja Fox as Dr. Maggie Doyle – ER Third-year Resident
- John Doman as Dr. Carl DeRaad – Chief of Psychiatry
- Scott Jaeck as Dr. Steven Flint – Chief of Radiology
- David Brisbin as Dr. Alexander Babcock – Anesthesiologist
- Michael Buchman Silver as Dr. Paul Meyers – Psychiatrist
- Matthew Glave as Dr. Dale Edson – Third-year Surgical Resident
- Tom Gallop as Dr. Roger Julian – Chief of Genetics
- Ted Rooney as Dr. Tabash – Neonatologist
- Perry Anzilotti as Dr. Ed – Anesthesiologist
- Kenneth Alan Williams as Dr. Thomas Gabriel
- Carl Lumbly as Dr. Graham Baker
- Stephanie Dunnam as Dr. McLucas
- Phyllis Frelich as Dr. Lisa Parks
- Dennis Boutsikaris as Dr. David Kotlowitz

Nurses

- Ellen Crawford as Nurse Lydia Wright
- Conni Marie Brazelton as Nurse Conni Oligario
- Deezer D as Nurse Malik McGrath
- Laura Cerón as Nurse Chuny Marquez
- Yvette Freeman as Nurse Haleh Adams
- Lily Mariye as Nurse Lily Jarvik
- Gedde Watanabe as Nurse Yosh Takata
- Penny Johnson as Nurse Practitioner Lynette Evans
- Dinah Lenney as Nurse Shirley
- Bellina Logan as Nurse Kit
- Suzanne Carney as OR Nurse Janet
- Janni Brenn as Nurse Kass

Staff, paramedics and officers

- Abraham Benrubi as Desk Clerk Jerry Markovic
- Kristin Minter as Desk Clerk Miranda "Randi" Fronczak
- Christine Healy as Hospital Administrator Harriet Spooner
- Jeff Cahill as Transport Dispatcher Tony Fig
- Emily Wagner as Paramedic Doris Pickman
- Montae Russell as Paramedic Dwight Zadro
- Lyn Alicia Henderson as Paramedic Pamela Olbes
- Brian Lester as Paramedic Brian Dumar
- Michelle Bonilla as Paramedic Christine Harms
- Demetrius Navarro as Paramedic Morales
- J. P. Hubbell as Paramedic Lars Audia
- Meg Thalken as Chopper EMT Dee McManus
- Ed Lauter as Fire Captain Dannaker
- Cress Williams as Officer Reggie Moore
- Mike Genovese as Officer Al Grabarsky
- Chad McKnight as Officer Wilson

Family

- Christine Harnos as Jennifer "Jenn" Greene
- Yvonne Zima as Rachel Greene
- Khandi Alexander as Jackie Robbins
- Lisa Nicole Carson as Carla Reece
- Matthew Watkins as Reese Benton
- Victor Williams as Roger McGrath
- Paul Freeman as Dr. Charles Corday
- Rose Gregorio as Helen Hathaway

=== Notable guest stars ===
- Keiko Agena as Mrs. Shimahara
- Xander Berkeley as Detective Wilson
- Julie Bowen as Roxanne Please
- Akosua Busia as Kobe Ikabo
- Jessica Capshaw as Sally McKenna
- Mike Doyle as Michael McKenna
- Teri Garr as Celinda Randlett
- Jenette Goldstein as Judy Stiles
- Dean Norris as Officer Clark
- Silas Weir Mitchell as Marcus Hainey
- Anna Gunn as Ikabo’s Lawyer
- Taraji P. Henson as Elan
- Djimon Hounsou as Mobalage Ikabo
- Harvey Korman as Stan Levy
- Maggie Lawson as Shannon Mitchell
- Valerie Mahaffey as Joi Abbott
- Marlee Matlin as Sign Language Instructor
- Eric Christian Olsen as Travis Mitchell
- Octavia Spencer as Maria Jones
- Holland Taylor as Phyllis Farr
- Terri J. Vaughn as Mrs. Gleason
- Sheila Kelley as Coco Robbins
- Billy Blanks as Kickboxing Instructor
- Ashley Johnson as Dana Ellis

== Episodes ==
No. overall	No. in season	Title	Directed by	Written by	Original release date	Prod. code	US viewers (millions)
92	1	"Day for Knight"	Christopher Chulack	Lydia Woodward	September 24, 1998	467551	31.86
New medical student Lucy Knight arrives in the ER and has a trying first shift. Ross and Weaver clash over the terms of Ross' probation after his unauthorized detox work. NOTE: First appearance of medical student Lucy Knight
93	2	"Split Second"	Christopher Misiano	Carol Flint	October 1, 1998	467552	30.63
Lucy is having some problems with the job, but Carter is under the belief she is excelling. Benton goes to a doctor to find out the extent of Reese's hearing loss. Corday restarts her internship despite pressure from her father and Romano after practicing an experimental surgical treatment. Greene helps treat his daughter when she is injured during a soccer game. Weaver tries to embarrass Ross further over his past actions.
94	3	"They Treat Horses, Don't They?"	T.R. Babu Subramaniam	Walon Green	October 8, 1998	467553	29.34
Benton performs dangerous surgery on a man strapped to a bomb. Ross receives some good news that Weaver does not embrace. Greene, at his daughter's insistence, tries to help a horse that is in pain. Jeanie returns from her vacation.
95	4	"Vanishing Act"	Lesli Linka Glatter	Jack Orman	October 15, 1998	467554	27.87
Carter finds out that Lucy doesn't know how to start an IV. Weaver interviews for a job as the ER Chief. Benton keeps his son's disease a secret. Jeanie intervenes when she finds out a liver transplant candidate is drinking again, and later asks Ross if she can be assigned to work for his pediatric project in the ER. Corday gets stuck as the intern of the smarmy Dr. Dale Edson.
96	5	"Masquerade"	Steve De Jarnatt	Story by : Joe Sachs & Samantha Howard Corbin; Teleplay by : Samantha Howard Corbin	October 29, 1998	467555	29.14
It is Halloween in the ER. Lucy and the other medical students throw a party that takes a turn for the worse, damaging her and Carter's relationship. An impressive candidate for the ER Chief position arrives from New York, much to Weaver's annoyance. Greene makes a potentially harmful mistake when he does not recognize a homeless schizophrenic woman's (Sheila Kelley) pregnancy. Benton treats Corday to a traditional Halloween.
97	6	"Stuck on You"	David Nutter	Story by : Neal Baer & Linda Gase; Teleplay by : Neal Baer	November 5, 1998	467556	28.61
The board decides to extend the search for a new ER Chief, leaving Weaver waiting for a decision. Benton visits a doctor who is deaf-mute who reassures him that there is nothing wrong with having a deaf child. Greene saves the life of a gay prostitute and counsels him on getting his life back on track. Carter loses his Resident Advisor job because of Lucy's party, then clashes with her when he tries to bend the rules regarding a patient's insurance. A 'sticky situation' in the trauma room inadvertently leads to Carter shaving off his beard. Corday saves two lives and impresses Benton enough that he decides to request she be his intern. Hathaway tries to help an elderly Jewish man find a place to live.
98	7	"Hazed and Confused"	Jonathan Kaplan	Story by : David Mills & Carol Flint; Teleplay by : David Mills	November 12, 1998	467557	28.97
Carter and Weaver become unlikely roommates. Lucy is having problems with Carter, and Greene picks up on their squabbling. Corday works long shifts which leads to her exhaustion and a critical medical error, causing a rift with Anspaugh and problems for Benton. Greene has unpleasant flashbacks when he is hazed by his paramedic colleagues. Jeanie and Ross treat a young boy whose mother clearly depends on his 6-year-old sister to make all decisions. Weaver rediscovers her joy of practicing medicine after being overlooked one too many times for the ER Chief position, which goes instead to a Dr. Amanda Lee.
99	8	"The Good Fight"	Christopher Chulack	Jack Orman	November 19, 1998	467558	29.00
It's a race against time to save the life of a little girl in the ER. While Benton and the surgical team use every extraordinary measure to save her life, Carter and Lucy traverse Chicago in an attempt to track down the girl's father, the only match for her blood type and who had kidnapped her two weeks before. In the process, Carter saves a woman and her son who are infected with tuberculosis and his jeep is destroyed. Finally, Carter and Lucy find the father at Doc Magoo's and though the girl receives his blood, the long delay results in her sustaining significant organ damage. Carter tells a devastated Lucy that in the end, they did all they could to give the girl her only chance of survival, and expresses approval of her work for the first time since their schism over her IV-line fraud. Though the girl's vital signs are getting better, it is unclear if she will come out of her coma and even if she does, is likely to face permanent renal failure.
100	9	"Good Luck, Ruth Johnson"	Rod Holcomb	Lydia Woodward	December 10, 1998	467559	29.97
Corday faces M&M following her crucial mistake in administering an incorrect dosage of drugs to a patient. She believes the mistake was in hospital policy; making the interns work for 36 hours straight. She is cleared and later decides to amicably end her relationship with Benton. Carter chaperones Ruth Johnson around the ER; a woman born 100 years ago in the same hospital. Hathaway is horrified by the true story behind a young boy's fatal shooting. At the end of the episode, Ruth's granddaughter is rushed to the hospital where she gives birth two weeks early to a baby girl who ends up being named Ruth Johnson as well.
101	10	"The Miracle Worker"	Lesli Linka Glatter	Paul Manning	December 17, 1998	467560	29.87
It is Christmas day in the ER. An 18-year-old boy arrives brain-dead, and Carter has to convince his parents to donate his organs, since a 16-year-old girl needs a liver. Benton risks his career by preventing Romano from operating under the influence of alcohol. Ross and Hathaway have a religious dispute over how to deal with a pregnant 13-year-old. Corday is charmed by a musician who is facing surgery for testicular cancer. Dr. Lee flirts with Greene but it seems there is something not quite right with her.
102	11	"Nobody Doesn't Like Amanda Lee"	Richard Thorpe	Linda Gase	January 7, 1999	467561	31.60
When Greene becomes interested in Dr. Lee's past, he discovers a number of worrying things, which Lee confirms when she locks him in a room with a patient. An old friend of Greene's recommends him for a NASA mission. Benton's son is having difficulties in day care. Ross and Hathaway help Joi, the exhausted mother of a little boy named Ricky who has Adrenoleukodystrophy. Carter is jealous when Lucy goes on a date with Dale.
103	12	"Double Blind"	Dave Chameides	Carol Flint	January 21, 1999	467562	30.48
Lucy begins her surgical rotation under Benton and Corday. After complaints by Doyle, Weaver interrogates Corday, asking if Romano ever sexually harassed her. Romano offers to get Corday's fellowship reinstated and asks her to assist him in surgery. Ross jeopardizes a new pain medication study by surreptitiously giving some of the drug to Joi's son Ricky. Greene and Weaver decide not to tell Anspaugh because of the violation of protocol on a federally funded trial.
104	13	"Choosing Joi"	Christopher Chulack	Lydia Woodward	February 4, 1999	467563	29.11
Hathaway and Ross help Joi cope as Ricky's condition deteriorates. Benton attends a parent/child signing class. Romano blackmails Corday into dropping her support for Doyle's harassment lawsuit, but in retaliation, Weaver forces Romano to rewrite his insulting and inaccurate review of Doyle's job performance. The ER unites to help an injured woman who needs to find temporary homes for her many dogs as she gets treatment. Greene treats the hospital janitor, Mobalage, whose injuries suggest he has been tortured in the past. Carter discovers something odd while working up one of his med students who is subsequently diagnosed with Hodgkin lymphoma.
105	14	"The Storm: Part I"	John Wells	John Wells	February 11, 1999	467564	31.92
Joi's son dies, and Ross' role in his death is exposed after the boy's father shows up and starts demanding information. Hathaway's clinic is temporarily closed. Greene and Weaver's cover-up of Ross' earlier actions to help Joi is revealed. Weaver suspends Ross from work and Hathaway chastises him for his selfish actions. The ER responds to a school bus accident. While en route to the scene, Jeanie and Ross crash on an icy road.
106	15	"The Storm: Part II"	Christopher Chulack	John Wells	February 18, 1999	467565	35.70
The ER is flooded with the survivors of the school bus accident. Jeanie is not critically injured from the previous episode's crash but gets other bad medical news. Mobalage's wife is having doubts about her husband's surgery and shares a horrifying secret with Hathaway. Carter and Lucy decide not to pursue a relationship despite the kiss shared in a previous episode. Mobalage's wife is brutally stabbed. After one more confrontation with the father of Joi's dead son, Ross makes a decision regarding his status at County—and his future in Chicago. NOTE: Final regular appearance of Dr. Doug Ross
107	16	"Middle of Nowhere"	Jonathan Kaplan	Carol Flint & Neal Baer	February 25, 1999	467566	30.26
Benton travels to a Mississippi clinic during his vacation time to earn some extra money for his son's therapy. Benton has to fight small town closemindedness, racism and a lower standard of medical care than he is used to working with. However, Benton's skills as a surgeon prove vital when a fishing boat accident nearly kills several men whom he saves, turning Benton into a local hero. Struggling with a grandmother's refusal to allow her granddaughter to receive surgery to fix a hole in her heart due to the grandmother distrusting doctors, Benton convinces them to return to Chicago with him so as to personally ensure the girl receives proper treatment. Upon his return, Benton learns of Jeanie's Hepatitis-C diagnosis and comforts her.
108	17	"Sticks and Stones"	Félix Enríquez Alcalá	Joe Sachs	March 25, 1999	467567	26.36
Carter deals with drama at an apartment tower during a ride-along that later has deadly consequences. Lucy has to hide a cancer diagnosis from an ill woman at the behest of the patient's family. Hathaway finds out she is pregnant. Weaver reflects on her own family issues when an injured wrestler comes to the ER. Greene continues to help Mobalage, who may be deported if he cannot tell the INS about the abuse he suffered in Nigeria as he is in the country illegally. After Mobalage's wife wakes up, he is cleared of attempted murder charges because she admits that it was a suicide attempt on her part.
109	18	"Point of Origin"	Christopher Misiano	Christopher Mack	April 8, 1999	467568	26.10
Greene uses his past trauma to help Mobalage through his own struggles. Carter's interest in becoming Chief Resident leads to him being in charge of the ER for a day, where he misunderstands a case involving the many broken bones of a baby, while Lucy begins her first Psych rotation. Weaver may have found her biological mother, but defies a DNR order to find out for sure, which angers Carol. Benton and Corday clash over a surgical fellowship.
110	19	"Rites of Spring"	Jonathan Kaplan	David Mills	April 29, 1999	467569	26.56
Carter mentors a gifted teen from a very rough neighborhood. Romano is upset about Benton's interest in the ER trauma fellowship. Lucy continues impressive work in her Psych rotation, treating a law student with homicidal impulses and an angry young boy who is being severely over-medicated. Jeanie continues to grapple with her hepatitis C but gets a boost from a kindly minister. Hathaway is worried about her pregnancy after a kid kicks her in the stomach, risking her baby. Greene and Corday attempt to go to a conference for trauma physicians but get lost repeatedly while having a lot of fun hanging out together. Mobalage is revealed to have been granted amnesty in the United States and leaves County to pursue a future in civil engineering.
111	20	"Power"	Laura Innes	Carol Flint	May 6, 1999	467570	27.40
Romano observes the ER, and rubs the staff the wrong way. Lucy finds out that an elderly patient's bedsore is really much more. Carter breaks up with his girlfriend. The power goes out at County General, and the doctors must keep critical patients alive. Corday investigates the rape of a comatose patient.
112	21	"Responsible Parties"	Christopher Chulack	Jack Orman	May 13, 1999	467571	27.53
A wounded exotic dancer comes in with a gunshot wound and two proclaimed Federal agents, but the case becomes very confusing when a real FBI agent shows up. Lucy reveals to Carter that she is still on Ritalin and responds to his unease by telling him to respect her privacy. Hathaway helps treat a mother dying of AIDS and later gets in touch with an offscreen Doug and confusing (and tearfully) tells Mark she ordered him not to return to Chicago but is devastated he is respecting her wishes for once. Anspaugh decides that the trauma fellowship will go to Benton, who then faces anger from Romano and Corday. A car with four students headed to prom has a fiery crash and leaves one young woman with a serious spinal injury and her brother with third-degree burns that he's going to die from within a week.
113	22	"Getting to Know You"	Jonathan Kaplan	Lydia Woodward	May 20, 1999	467572	32.60
The rest of the staff finds out that Hathaway is pregnant with twins. Benton begins a custody battle for his son when Carla reveals she has married her boyfriend Roger and is moving to Germany. Weaver rescues an abandoned toddler who has been drugged. Carter's protégé is mugged and beaten up, and Lucy has had enough of Carter's attitude and lets him know she's sick of it. Greene and Corday share a kiss.
