= ER season 1 =

ER
- Season 1
- DVD cover
- Starring: Anthony Edwards; George Clooney; Sherry Stringfield; Noah Wyle; Julianna Margulies; Eriq La Salle
- No. of episodes: 25

Release
- Original network: NBC
- Original release: September 19, 1994 – May 18, 1995

Season chronology
- Next → Season 2

The first season of the American fictional drama television series ER aired on NBC from September 19, 1994 to May 18, 1995. The first season consists of 25 episodes.

== Plot ==
In ER's first season, the core cast consisted of Chief Resident Dr. Mark Greene, pediatric resident Dr. Doug Ross, second-year resident Dr. Susan Lewis, medical student John Carter, head nurse Carol Hathaway, and second-year surgical resident Dr. Peter Benton.

The series premiere "24 Hours" sees Dr. Greene considering a move into private practice at the request of his wife, Jen. The episode also sees an attempted suicide from staff nurse Carol Hathaway, who had previously been in a long-term relationship with Doug Ross, as well as the first day for medical student John Carter.

Originally, Carol Hathaway died by suicide, but her death in the pilot was never shown or referred to by other characters, leaving her open for a return. Audiences responded so well to her character that producers decided to offer Julianna Margulies a permanent spot in the cast. Her love interest in the first season is John "Tag" Taglieri.

One of the major events this season is a blizzard that sends multiple patients to County General.

Also over the course of the season, Dr. Greene's marriage begins to disintegrate. At work, he experiences problems, after making a fatal error in the treatment of a pregnant woman in the Emmy-winning episode "Love's Labor Lost." He falls into a depression.

Meanwhile, a lovelorn Ross struggles to come to terms with the fact that a recovered Hathaway is moving on with her life while Dr. Lewis tries to cope with her rebellious sister, Chloe, who becomes pregnant and gives birth to a daughter at the end of the season. Lewis also struggles professionally with cardiologist Dr. Kayson and romantically with mentally unstable psychiatrist Dr. Div Cvetic.

Carter comes to grips with the fast-paced life of an ER doctor, while trying to win the approval of his demanding supervising resident, Dr. Peter Benton. Hathaway gets back on her feet in the aftermath of her suicide attempt; she gets engaged and tries to adopt an HIV-positive Russian orphan, but is denied due to her suicide attempt. On her wedding day, her fiancé, Dr. John Taglieri, questions the strength of her love for him. She admits she does not love him as much as he loves her, and he leaves her shortly before the ceremony.

Dr. Benton is forced to cope with his busy surgical schedule, while caring for his ailing mother. After her death, he becomes romantically involved with her physical therapist Jeanie Boulet.

== Production ==
The series pilot was executive produced by Michael Crichton and John Wells, Dennis Murphy produced the pilot episode and Wendy Spence Rosato served as associate producer. Crichton, Wells, and Spence-Rosato continued these roles for the series proper while Murphy was replaced as producer by Christopher Chulack. Also joining the production team were Mimi Leder, Robert Nathan, and Lydia Woodward as supervising producers and Paul Manning as Co-producer.

Crichton wrote the series pilot and is credited as the creator of the series for the rest of the season. Producers Wells, Nathan, Woodward, and Manning were regular writers for the first season. Medical specialist and technical advisor Lance Gentile made his television writing debut in the first season. His first teleplay "Love's Labor Lost" won multiple Emmy Awards. Medical student Neal Baer was the season's other regular writer. Tracey Stern contributed the script for a single episode.

Producers Leder and Chulack were regular directors on the first season. Rod Holcomb directed the pilot episode and returned for a regular season episode. Charles Haid, Elodie Keene, and Fred Gerber also helmed multiple episodes. Film director Quentin Tarantino contributed a single episode. Other single episode directors include Mark Tinker, Vern Gillum, James Hayman, Daniel Sackheim, Félix Enríquez Alcalá, Anita Addison, and Donna Deitch.

== Cast ==
=== Main cast ===
- Anthony Edwards as Dr. Mark Greene – Chief Resident
- George Clooney as Dr. Doug Ross – Pediatric Fellow (Fourth-year Resident)
- Sherry Stringfield as Dr. Susan Lewis – Second-year ER Resident
- Noah Wyle as John Carter – Third-year Rotating Medical Student
- Julianna Margulies as Nurse Carol Hathaway – Registered Nurse and Nurse Manager (main: episodes 2−25; guest: episode 1)
- Eriq La Salle as Dr. Peter Benton – Second-year Surgical Resident

=== Supporting cast ===
Doctors and medical students

- William H. Macy as Dr. David Morgenstern – Chief of Surgery and Emergency Medicine
- Sam Anderson as Dr. Jack Kayson – Chief of Cardiology
- Amy Aquino as Dr. Janet Coburn – Chief of Obstetrics and Gynecology
- CCH Pounder as Dr. Angela Hicks – Surgical/Emergency Medical Attending Physician
- Ming-Na Wen as Deb Chen – Third-year Medical Student
- Michael Ironside as Dr. William "Wild Willy" Swift – Chief of Emergency Medicine
- Scott Jaeck as Dr. Steven Flint – Chief of Radiology
- Rick Rossovich as Dr. John "Tag" Taglieri – Orthopedist
- John Terry as Dr. David "Div" Cvetic – Psychiatrist
- Tyra Ferrell as Dr. Sarah Langworthy – Third-year Surgical Resident
- Perry Anzilotti as Dr. Ed – Anesthesiologist
- Tobin Bell as Dr. Wertz – Hospital Administrator
- Patrick Collins as Dr. Netzley
- Marion Yue as Dr. Sandra Li
- Matt Gottlieb as Dr. Ashley
- Pierre Epstein as Dr. Alex Bradley – Chief of Staff

Nurses

- Ellen Crawford as Nurse Lydia Wright
- Conni Marie Brazelton as Nurse Conni Oligario
- Deezer D as Nurse Malik McGrath
- Laura Ceron as Nurse Chuny Marquez
- Yvette Freeman as Nurse Haleh Adams
- Lily Mariye as Nurse Lily Jarvik
- Vanessa Marquez as Nurse Wendy Goldman
- Dinah Lenney as Nurse Shirley
- Suzanne Carney as OR Nurse Janet

Staff, paramedics and officers

- Gloria Reuben as Physical Therapist Jeanie Boulet
- Abraham Benrubi as Desk Clerk Jerry Markovic
- Glenn Plummer as Desk Clerk Timmy Rawlins
- Rolando Molina as Desk Clerk Rolando
- Małgorzata Gebel as ER aide (Dr.) Bogdana "Bob" Romansky
- Lisa Zane as Risk Management Diane Leeds
- Christine Healy as Hospital Administrator Harriet Spooner
- Emily Wagner as Paramedic Doris Pickman
- Montae Russell as Paramedic Dwight Zadro
- Lee Sellers as Chopper EMT
- Mike Genovese as Officer Al Grabarsky
- Rick Marzan as Camacho

Family

- Christine Harnos as Jennifer "Jenn" Greene
- Yvonne Zima as Rachel Greene
- Georgiana Tarjan as Helen Hathaway
- Khandi Alexander as Jackie Robbins
- Ving Rhames as Walter Robbins
- Beah Richards as Mae Benton
- Tamala Jones as Joanie Robbins
- Mark Dakota Robinson as Steven Robbins
- Kathleen Wilhoite as Chloe Lewis
- Valerie Perrine as Cookie Lewis
- Zachary Browne as Jake Leeds
- Michael Beach as Al Boulet

=== Notable guest stars ===
- Adam Scott as David Kersetter
- Andrea Parker as Linda Ferrell
- Miguel Ferrer as Mr. Parker
- Troy Evans as Officer Frank Martin
- Liz Vassey as Liz
- John Randolph as Mr. Franks
- John La Motta as Ivan Gregor
- Rosemary Clooney as Madam X/Mary Cavanaugh
- Ken Lerner as Harry Stopek
- Alan Rosenberg as Samuel Gasner
- Vondie Curtis-Hall as Henry Colton/Rena
- Anne Haney as Mrs. Packer
- Bobcat Goldthwait as Mr. Conally (voice only)
- Robert Carradine as John Koch
- Bradley Whitford as Sean O'Brien
- Colleen Flynn as Jodi O'Brien
- Kristin Davis as Leslie
- Garrett Morris as Edgar Luck
- Debra Jo Rupp as Mrs. Dibble
- Amy Ryan as Sister Elizabeth
- Kevin Michael Richardson as Patrick

== Episodes ==
No. overall	No. in season	Title	Directed by	Written by	Original release date	Prod. code	US viewers (millions)
1	1	"24 Hours"	Rod Holcomb	Michael Crichton	September 19, 1994	475079	23.8
Pilot. John Carter, a third-year medical student, begins the first day of his rotation in the ER at County General Hospital. Dr. Mark Greene, an ER resident physician, is mulling an offer to go into private practice, while juggling his responsibilities with his position in the ER and his strained marriage. Dr. Susan Lewis, another ER resident, deals with a myriad of patients, including a patient with advanced cancer. Dr. Peter Benton diagnoses a patient with a triple A and risks his career in order to treat him. Dr. Doug Ross, the ER pediatrician, confronts a woman over potential abuse of her son. The head nurse, Carol Hathaway, returns several hours after her shift as a patient, overdosing in an apparent suicide attempt. NOTE: First appearance of future desk clerk Frank Martin, as a patient with anger issues.
2	2	"Day One"	Mimi Leder	John Wells	September 22, 1994	456601	23.0
Lewis butts heads with the resident psychiatrist, Dr. Div Cvetic, over care for a senile patient. Greene tries to deal with an elderly man who insists on keeping his wife on life support even though she is DNR. Benton corrects a diagnosis made on a patient by their own physician. Carter is seduced by a sexy patient. A family comes in after an alcohol-related car accident. Greene's wife has passed the bar exam and they have sex in the hospital's bathroom. Ross visits Hathaway, who is recovering from her suicide attempt. Carter saves a patient for the first time on his own after the patient goes unconscious from arrhythmia. Greene tells his wife he doesn't know if he will leave the hospital.
3	3	"Going Home"	Mark Tinker	Lydia Woodward	September 29, 1994	456602	23.9
Hathaway returns to work after her suicide attempt, and gets support from her co-workers and her orthopedic surgeon boyfriend, Dr. John "Tag" Tagliari. Greene finds difficulty in treating a patient suffering from domestic violence. A mysterious woman (played by Rosemary Clooney) comes to the ER alone and sings to the doctors and patients while the doctors try to find out who she is. Lewis deals with a heart patient. Benton works with an injured convenience store clerk who insists on defending himself when his store is robbed. Ross suffers with his guilty conscience over Hathaway's attempted suicide.
4	4	"Hit and Run"	Mimi Leder	Paul Manning	October 6, 1994	456604	26.8
Ross tries to use his charm in both a case involving a mother with severe mental illness and an effort to win back Carol, and fails completely in both instances. Benton clashes with another surgeon over a hit-and-run patient. Carter mixes up patients when he tries to notify a family of a lost patient. A married man comes in suffering a mild heart attack while handcuffed to his mistress. A salesman's cell phone causes electronic interference all throughout the ER.
5	5	"Into That Good Night"	Charles Haid	Robert Nathan	October 13, 1994	456603	26.7
Greene mulls a decision to move to Milwaukee so his wife, Jennifer, can pursue her law career. He and the rest of the ER staff tend to a dying heart transplant candidate. Ross counsels a woman who cannot afford medication for her asthmatic daughter. Carter may have made a mistake with a former patient. Lewis has to juggle dealing with an alcohol-poisoned fraternity brother and calls from her mother to get her prodigal sister, Chloe, a job.
6	6	"Chicago Heat"	Elodie Keene	Story by : Neal Baer; Teleplay by : John Wells	October 20, 1994	456605	27.3
Chicago is suffering from an intense heatwave and the air conditioning at County General is broken. Greene brings his daughter, Rachel, to work with him while Jennifer goes apartment hunting in Milwaukee. Ross works with a 5-year-old girl who ingested cocaine. Benton tries to save a young robber shot by his frequent convenience store clerk patient. Lewis tries to deal with Chloe's worsening mental problems. Hathaway and the other nurses place bets over a homeless patient's alcohol level.
7	7	"Another Perfect Day"	Vern Gillum	Story by : Lance Gentile; Teleplay by : Lydia Woodward	November 3, 1994	456606	25.7
Ross and Hathaway save a young boating accident victim. They give in to their feelings briefly, making Hathaway reconsider moving in with Tag. Chloe disrupts a date between Lewis and Cvetic on Lewis' birthday. Benton is competing for a prestigious fellowship. Greene observes Carter in the ER, giving Carter some confidence.
8	8	"9½ Hours"	James Hayman	Robert Nathan	November 10, 1994	456607	28.3
Greene calls in sick so he and Jennifer can spend the day together, leaving Ross in charge of the ER. Carter works on a high school wrestler who starved himself to make weight. Hathaway counsels a young rape survivor. Benton is dealing with his senile mother, and butts heads with Ross over treatment of a patient. Lewis is worried about Cvetic's growing temper problem.
9	9	"ER Confidential"	Daniel Sackheim	Paul Manning	November 17, 1994	456608	24.5
Lewis is caught in the middle as both Cvetic and Chloe have problems. Carter tries to help a suicidal transgender woman. The ER tries to save two boys who killed a girl in a car accident. Benton invites Carter to Thanksgiving with his family. Hathaway confesses her feelings about Ross to Tag after Ross begins a new affair. NOTE: Last appearance of Dr. Cvetic.
10	10	"Blizzard"	Mimi Leder	Story by : Neal Baer & Paul Manning; Teleplay by : Lance Gentile	December 8, 1994	456609	29.1
It's a December blizzard, and the day starts out quiet. Hathaway announces her engagement with Tag. The residents play a practical joke on a sleeping Carter. Suddenly, County General goes into crisis mode when a 32-car pileup on an expressway inundates them with patients. Among the patients are a young male who Benton knows who has lost his leg, a patient of Ross' who dies suddenly while waiting for treatment, and a man who is snowed in at home and calls Greene when his wife refuses to go to the hospital to have her baby. Lewis tries to save a man who suddenly develops an aneurysm, and the patient is saved by the most unlikely person.
11	11	"The Gift"	Félix Enríquez Alcalá	Neal Baer	December 15, 1994	456610	27.8
A transfer team is due by helicopter to receive donor organs – but Benton has not yet obtained next-of-kin approval for the organ harvest. Although it's Christmas Eve, Greene has not found time to shop for gifts. Ross crashes Hathaway's engagement party. Carter gives Lewis her Secret Santa present and Chloe hands her another – the announcement of her pregnancy.
12	12	"Happy New Year"	Charles Haid	Lydia Woodward	January 5, 1995	456611	30.4
Carter proves he's ready for the OR – but his first day in surgical attendance is a comedy of mishaps. The consequences are grave when Lewis discharges a cardiac patient without further assessment. Benton must deal with a family conflict.
13	13	"Luck of the Draw"	Rod Holcomb	Paul Manning	January 12, 1995	456612	31.2
Lewis is under investigation for negligence and Greene is ordered to supervise her work. A customs agent brings in a suspect whose intestines are packed with contraband. Carter shows new medical student Jing-Mei "Deb" Chen around the ER. NOTE: First appearance of medical student Jing-Mei "Deb" Chen
14	14	"Long Day's Journey"	Anita Addison	Robert Nathan	January 19, 1995	456613	34.0
Lewis attends a review board of her actions. The nonstop parade of crises and stricken young innocents weighs heavily on Ross. Meanwhile, a surprising heart attack victim under Lewis' care is the same doctor who nearly wrecked her career. Benton hires a physical therapist, Jeanie Boulet, to take care of his mother. NOTE: First appearance of physical therapist Jeanie Boulet
15	15	"Feb 5, '95"	James Hayman	John Wells	February 2, 1995	456614	34.0
Morgenstern surprises Greene with a new job offer. A terminally ill breast cancer patient asks Greene to help her die. An armed boy threatens the hospital staff. Crash carts bought for the ER suddenly disappear and Hathaway, Ross, Carter, and Wright go snooping around the hospital to locate them. A snake gets loose in the ER.
16	16	"Make of Two Hearts"	Mimi Leder	Lydia Woodward	February 9, 1995	456615	34.2
Kayson pursues Lewis romantically. Ross and Hathaway cope with a young Russian girl with AIDS whose adoptive mother abandons her. A humane policeman hauls in a dog he hit with his car. Lewis and Hathaway treat a team of high school cheerleaders who ingested drug filled chocolates, which Deb also accidentally consumes.
17	17	"The Birthday Party"	Elodie Keene	John Wells	February 16, 1995	456616	32.7
Greene and Benton each have family birthday parties to attend, but ER demands may keep them away. Meanwhile, Carter mistakenly thinks it's Benton's birthday and hires belly dancers as a celebratory surprise. Hathaway considers adoption. Ross assaults a man in the ER he believes kicked his own daughter out a window and faces disciplinary action. Just before the end of their shifts, Benton and Connie treat a white supremacist with stab wounds.
18	18	"Sleepless in Chicago"	Christopher Chulack	Paul Manning	February 23, 1995	456617	35.0
Benton runs on no sleep for 48 hours, leading to trouble. A con man works the floor. Robert Carradine guest stars as a hospital efficiency expert. Greene's wife wants a divorce. Hathaway's past comes back to haunt her.
19	19	"Love's Labor Lost"	Mimi Leder	Lance Gentile	March 9, 1995	456618	34.4
Greene misdiagnoses a pregnant patient, leading to a long and arduous surgery. Meanwhile, Benton's mother suffers a broken hip and must have surgery herself. In 1997, TV Guide ranked this episode #3 on its list of the 100 Greatest Episodes. In 2009, it moved to #6.
20	20	"Full Moon, Saturday Night"	Donna Deitch	Neal Baer	March 30, 1995	456619	32.9
The moon is full and so is the ER – filled with "popsicle" pledges, a would-be werewolf, and others affected by "lunar lunacy" – and Lewis is the only resident available. Coping with emotional problems, Greene's not making a good impression on the new ER chief.
21	21	"House of Cards"	Fred Gerber	Tracey Stern	April 6, 1995	456620	35.3
Greene must lead a medical review on the ill-fated pre-eclampsia case he recently misdiagnosed. The rivalry between Carter and Chen causes Chen to make a disastrous mistake. Lewis' pregnant sister Chloe returns from Texas. NOTE: Dr. Chen leaves the show for five years.
22	22	"Men Plan, God Laughs"	Christopher Chulack	Robert Nathan	April 27, 1995	456621	33.5
Benton compensates for his inability to help his mother by going beyond the call of duty to help his patients. Meanwhile, Greene's attempts to save his marriage lead to more trouble with the new ER chief.
23	23	"Love Among the Ruins"	Fred Gerber	Paul Manning	May 4, 1995	456622	31.5
Carter's family background is discovered. Benton starts falling for a married woman. Hathaway has trouble writing her wedding vows. Greene is living with his wife in Milwaukee, but their marriage is still broken. Lewis treats a suicidal patient.
24	24	"Motherhood"	Quentin Tarantino	Lydia Woodward	May 11, 1995	456623	33.1
Ross must deal with commitment issues. Carter's future is uncertain. Lewis helps deliver her niece. Benton receives some bad news about his mother.
25	25	"Everything Old Is New Again"	Mimi Leder	John Wells	May 18, 1995	456624	33.6
Both Greene and Carter get some surprising news. At Hathaway's wedding, not everything goes as planned.

== Reception ==
Critical reactions for ER's first season were very favorable. Alan Rich, writing for Variety, praised the direction and editing of the pilot while Eric Mink, writing for the New York Daily News, said that the pilot of ER "was urban, emergency room chaos and young, committed doctors." However some reviewers felt the episodes following the pilot didn't live up to it with Mink commenting that "...the great promise of the "E.R." pilot dissolves into the kind of routine, predictable, sloppily detailed medical drama we've seen many times before."

Due to the show launching on NBC at the same time that CBS launched its own medical drama Chicago Hope, many critics drew comparisons between the two. Eric Mink concluded that ER may rate more highly in the Nielsens but Chicago Hope told better stories, while Rich felt both shows were "riveting, superior TV fare."

The show's first season won several major television awards. Julianna Margulies picked up an Emmy Award for Outstanding Supporting Actress in a Drama Series, while Mimi Leder won an Emmy for Outstanding Individual Achievement in Directing a Drama Series for the episode "Love's Labor Lost". "Love's Labor Lost" also picked up the 1995 Writers Guild of America Award for Episodic Drama and the 1995 American Cinema Editors Award. "Day One" picked up two awards for Cinematography at the American Society of Cinematographers Awards of 1994 while Charles Haid won the Directors Guild of America Award for Primetime Drama Series for the episode "Into that Good Night" with Rod Holcomb also picking up a Directors Guild Award in the Dramatic Specials category for his work on "24 Hours".
