= ER season 6 =

ER
- Season 6
- DVD cover
- Starring: Anthony Edwards; Noah Wyle; Julianna Margulies; Gloria Reuben; Laura Innes; Alex Kingston; Kellie Martin; Paul McCrane; Goran Visnjic; Maura Tierney; Michael Michele; Erik Palladino; Ming-Na; Eriq La Salle
- No. of episodes: 22

Release
- Original network: NBC
- Original release: September 30, 1999 – May 18, 2000

Season chronology
- ← Previous; Season 5 Next → Season 7

The sixth season of the American fictional drama television series ER first aired on NBC on September 30, 1999, and concluded on May 18, 2000. The sixth season consists of 22 episodes.

== Plot ==
In the first major cast change in ER, the sixth season sees the addition of four new characters: Dr. Luka Kovač; nurse, later third-year medical student, Abby Lockhart; Dr. Cleo Finch; and Dr. Dave Malucci. Paul McCrane's Robert Romano is now billed as a series regular and Deb Chen from season one, now preferring to be called Dr. Jing-Mei Chen, returns. Physician assistant Jeanie Boulet leaves to care for her HIV-positive child. Lucy Knight and John Carter are attacked and stabbed by a psychotic patient. The ER staff works to save Carter and Lucy. Despite everyone's best efforts, they are unable to save Lucy who, despite making it through a gruelling surgery, suffers a massive blood clot and dies.

Croatian doctor Luka Kovač joins the team and struggles to gain the respect and trust from his new colleagues in the ER. Hathaway struggles to begin parenting on her own, then decides to leave Chicago to begin a new life with Doug Ross. Greene and Corday begin their relationship and he deals with the death of his father. Abby Lockhart begins her third-year-med-student rotation. While still recovering from the violent attack that left him near death and killed Lucy, Carter develops an addiction to Fentanyl, forcing Greene, Chen, and Weaver along with Benton and the other doctors into an intervention to get Carter to admit his drug addiction and seek help. Initially in denial and faced with their confrontation, Carter reluctantly accepts the truth of his addiction and -- with Benton accompanying him -- checks into rehab in the season finale. This season saw the exits of Julianna Margulies, Gloria Reuben and Kellie Martin as series regulars.

== Cast ==
=== Main cast ===
- Anthony Edwards as Dr. Mark Greene – Attending Emergency Physician
- Noah Wyle as Dr. John Carter – Third-year ER Resident
- Julianna Margulies as Carol Hathaway – RN and Nurse Manager (episodes 1–21)
- Gloria Reuben as Jeanie Boulet – Physician Assistant (episodes 1–6)
- Laura Innes as Dr. Kerry Weaver – Chief of Emergency Medicine
- Alex Kingston as Dr. Elizabeth Corday – Associate Chief of Surgery
- Kellie Martin as Lucy Knight – Fourth-year Rotating Medical Student (episodes 1–14)
- Paul McCrane as Dr. Robert Romano – Chief of Staff and Chief of Surgery
- Goran Visnjic as Dr. Luka Kovač – Attending Emergency Physician
- Maura Tierney as Abby Lockhart – RN and Third-year Rotating Medical Student (main: episodes 12–22; guest: episode 8)
- Michael Michele as Dr. Cleo Finch – Second-year Pediatrics ER Resident
- Erik Palladino as Dr. Dave Malucci – Second-year ER Resident (main: episodes 7–22; recurring: episodes 2−6)
- Ming-Na as Dr. Jing-Mei Chen – Third-year ER Resident (episodes 10–22)
- Eriq La Salle as Dr. Peter Benton – Trauma/Surgical Fellow

=== Supporting cast ===
Doctors and medical Students

- Alan Alda as Dr. Gabriel Lawrence – Attending Physician
- Sam Anderson as Dr. Jack Kayson – Chief of Cardiology
- Amy Aquino as Dr. Janet Coburn – Chief of Obstetrics and Gynecology
- John Aylward as Dr. Donald Anspaugh – Surgical Attending Physician, Hospital Board Member
- John Doman as Dr. Carl DeRaad – Chief of Psychiatry
- Michael Buchman Silver as Dr. Paul Meyers – Psychiatrist
- Scott Jaeck as Dr. Steven Flint – Chief of Radiology
- David Brisbin as Dr. Alexander Babcock – Anesthesiologist
- Tom Gallop as Dr. Roger Julian – Chief of Genetics
- Perry Anzilotti as Dr. Ed – Anesthesiologist
- Megan Cole as Dr. Alice Upton – Pathologist
- Stephanie Dunnam as Dr. McLucas
- Randy Lowell as Dr. Dan Shine

Nurses

- Ellen Crawford as Nurse Lydia Wright
- Conni Marie Brazelton as Nurse Conni Oligario
- Deezer D as Nurse Malik McGrath
- Laura Cerón as Nurse Chuny Marquez
- Yvette Freeman as Nurse Haleh Adams
- Lily Mariye as Nurse Lily Jarvik
- Gedde Watanabe as Nurse Yosh Takata
- Dinah Lenney as Nurse Shirley
- Bellina Logan as Nurse Kit
- Kyle Richards as Nurse Dori Kerns
- Suzanne Carney as OR Nurse Janet
- Lucy Rodriguez as Nurse Bjerke
- Morris Chestnut as ICU Nurse Frank "Rambo" Bacon
- Jeannie Lee as Nurse Vivian
- Elizabeth Rodriguez as Nurse Sandra
- Mary Heiss as Nurse Mary

Staff, paramedics and officers

- Erica Gimpel as Social Worker Adele Newman
- Kristin Minter as Desk Clerk Miranda "Randi" Fronczak
- Troy Evans as Desk Clerk Frank Martin
- Andrew Bowen as Desk Clerk Andrew
- Pamela Sinha as Desk Clerk Amira
- Jeff Cahill as Transport Dispatcher Tony Fig
- Emily Wagner as Paramedic Doris Pickman
- Montae Russell as Paramedic Dwight Zadro
- Lyn Alicia Henderson as Paramedic Pamela Olbes
- Demetrius Navarro as Paramedic Morales
- Brian Lester as Paramedic Brian Dumar
- Michelle Bonilla as Paramedic Christine Harms
- Meg Thalken as Chopper EMT Dee McManus
- Mike Genovese as Officer Al Grabarsky
- Cress Williams as Officer Reggie Moore
- Chad McKnight as Officer Wilson
- David Roberson as Officer Durcy
- Joe Basile as Officer Tom Bennini

Family

- Khandi Alexander as Jackie Robbins
- Lisa Nicole Carson as Carla Simmons
- Matthew Watkins as Reese Benton
- John Cullum as David Greene
- Yvonne Zima as Rachel Greene
- Judy Parfitt as Isabelle Corday
- Frances Sternhagen as Millicent Carter

=== Notable guest stars ===
- Rebecca De Mornay as Elaine Nichols
- Martha Plimpton as Meg Corwin
- Vincent Kartheiser as Jesse Keenan
- Emile Hirsch as Chad Kottmeier
- Lawrence Monoson as Dean Rollins
- Gabrielle Union as Tamara Davis
- Shia LaBeouf as Darnel Smith
- Chris Marquette as Marty Dorset
- Anton Yelchin as Robbie Edelstein
- David Krumholtz as Paul Sobriki
- Liza Weil as Samantha Sobriki
- Mitch Pileggi as Terry Waters
- Dakota Fanning as Delia Chadsey
- George Clooney as Dr. Doug Ross (uncredited)
- Randolph Mantooth as Policeman at school

== Production ==
Original executive producers John Wells and Michael Crichton reprised their roles. Lydia Woodward also returned as an executive producer but left the crew with the close of the season. Long-time crew member and fifth season executive producer Christopher Chulack moved on to executive produce Wells' new series Third Watch but remained a consulting producer for ER. Fifth season supervising producers Jack Orman and Neal Baer were promoted to co-executive producers for the sixth season. R. Scott Gemmill joined the crew as a supervising producer and writer. Fifth season producers Penny Adams and Wendy Spence Rosato returned for the sixth season. Fifth season co-producers Richard Thorpe and Jonathan Kaplan were promoted to producers for the sixth season. They were joined by new producers Doug Palau and Patrick Harbinson. Palau left the crew mid-season and Adams and Harbinson left at the end of the season. Michael Salmunovich returned as a co-producer and Teresa Salamunovich joined the crew, initially as a production co-ordinator but was promoted to associate producer mid-season. She was joined by new associate producer Vicki Voltarel who was on staff for the second half of the season only.

Wells and Woodward continued to write episodes and Wells contributed two episodes while Woodward wrote three. Orman wrote four episodes and Baer, Harbinson, and Gemmill each wrote three. Series medical expert and fifth season story editor Joe Sachs was promoted to executive story editor for the sixth season and he wrote a further two episodes. Regular writer Linda Gase replaced him as story editor and contributed a further episode. New writer Sandy Kroopf wrote a single episode.

Producers Kaplan and Thorpe served as the seasons regular directors; Kaplan directed five episodes and Thorpe helmed three. Cast members Laura Innes and Anthony Edwards each directed a further episode. Returning directors were Lesli Linka Glatter, Félix Enríquez Alcalá, Christopher Misiano, David Nutter, and Steve De Jarnatt. New directors include Ken Kwapis, Marita Grabiak, medical consultant Fred Einesman, Kevin Hooks, and Peter Markle.

== Episodes ==
No. overall	No. in season	Title	Directed by	Written by	Original release date	Prod. code	US viewers (millions)
114	1	"Leave It to Weaver"	Jonathan Kaplan	Lydia Woodward	September 30, 1999	225451	31.53
Greene and Weaver agree to go out on a limb to oppose Romano's appointment as chief of staff. However, soon Greene finds he is out there alone, while Weaver reaps immediate benefits for her treachery. Luka Kovač, an able, yet untrusted, physician from Croatia, arrives at the ER for his first day of work. Carter's interested in a romance with his cousin's ex-wife. Hathaway adjusts to being pregnant alone. NOTE: First appearances of Dr. Luka Kovač and Dr. Cleo Finch
115	2	"Last Rites"	Félix Enríquez Alcalá	Jack Orman	October 7, 1999	225452	28.20
Weaver may be head of the ER, but Greene has his own ideas about how to handle situations and, after his mother's death, the two of them have their worst conflict on the job yet. Boulet says "yes" to Reggie, and Corday accepts Romano's surprise job offer. A brash new resident, Dave Malucci, arrives and manages to annoy just about everyone. Carla confronts Benton about not allowing her to leave the country with their son. Carter and Elaine's relationship continues. NOTE: First appearance of Dr. Dave Malucci
116	3	"Greene with Envy"	Peter Markle	Patrick Harbinson	October 14, 1999	225453	30.45
The newly appointed attending physician (guest Alan Alda) is savvy, personable and, in Greene's jealous opinion, unsuitable for County. Jeanie and Reggie marry, but not under the circumstances they expected. Romano makes Corday show a rude reporter around the ER, where she witnesses a shootout. Carter tries to be supportive as Elaine undergoes her mastectomy. Corday and Romano are staggered by the front-page hatchet job the rude reporter publishes – she's offended by the reporter's misinterpretation but Romano is offended because it didn't trumpet him. Greene and Corday spend their first night together.
117	4	"Sins of the Fathers"	Ken Kwapis	Doug Palau	October 21, 1999	225454	29.56
Greene deals with the fallout from his dad's car accident. Lawrence suspects a teen's suicide attempt is the fallout from father-son strife, but he is wrong. Finch misdiagnoses a little girl's behavior before an iron overdose has the staff battling to save the little girl although they are unsuccessful. Hathaway tries to help a pregnant woman get a job at the hospital, and Dr. Dave Malucci is a jerk again. Carter makes plans to meet with Elaine.
118	5	"Truth & Consequences"	Steve De Jarnatt	R. Scott Gemmill	November 4, 1999	225455	28.61
A high school science experiment/prank gone-wrong lands students and teachers in the ER – and the stress of multiple emergencies pushes Lawrence over the edge. Greene defends a patient from a violent parent and ends up being castigated for it. Lucy helps counsel one of the injured students. Hathaway learns the pregnant woman she wanted to help is using drugs. Elaine tells Carter that she intends to go to Europe for a couple of months asking him not to contact her.
119	6	"The Peace of Wild Things"	Richard Thorpe	John Wells	November 11, 1999	225456	28.51
Boulet resigns to be a full-time mother. An elderly woman bids farewell to her dying husband, and Lawrence admits he is in the early stages of Alzheimer's, and that his distinguished career is over. Hathaway takes action regarding the pregnant drug-addict case. An explosion rocks the ER, and Benton tells Carla why he is fighting to stay in his son's life. NOTE: Final regular appearance of Physician Assistant Jeanie Boulet
120	7	"Humpty Dumpty"	Jonathan Kaplan	Neal Baer	November 18, 1999	225457	28.77
Lawrence departs (but not before saving a life), and Kovač comes aboard full time after earning Weaver's respect. Corday discovers her new trauma patient is a rapist and takes extreme measures to find his latest victim. Hathaway and the formerly pregnant drug-using woman have a confrontation. Carter angles for more responsibility inside the ER. Greene's father was due to fly into Chicago but shows up hours after his scheduled arrival time. And the Bright Star Gospel Choir is rushed to the ER.
121	8	"Great Expectations"	Christopher Misiano	Jack Orman	November 25, 1999	225458	30.80
It is Thanksgiving, and Hathaway has two more reasons to give thanks after overcoming complications and delivering twins Tess and Kate. Greene's family celebration comes with its own complications. Malucci stuns the staff by actually having a valid idea to treat a patient that works. NOTE: First appearance of Nurse Abby Lockhart
122	9	"How the Finch Stole Christmas"	Fred Einesman	Linda Gase	December 16, 1999	225459	29.10
Lucy risks Romano's wrath (and her career) to arrange a heart operation for a patient. Corday is conflicted when the rapist from earlier is arrested on other charges and then develops a potentially fatal clot issue, leaving her to consider whether to convince him to have life-saving surgery or just let him die. Carter gives gifts to inner city kids in exchange for their guns. Finch uses her authority to put a teen binge drinker into rehab. Benton and Carla's custody battle comes to an abrupt end that works out in his favor. Weaver befriends a group of Santas and works on County's Y2K preparation.
123	10	"Family Matters"	Anthony Edwards	Patrick Harbinson	January 6, 2000	225460	28.69
Deb Chen returns to the ER as Jing-Mei Chen and immediately shows off her great photographic memory, much to Carter's annoyance. Kovač's strong sense of family sees him become involved in the fate of brothers facing separation. Greene invites his lonely dad to reside with him in Chicago. Malucci fixes Weaver's car and learns a young patient has a fatal disease. Goofball students arrive in the ER to do a scavenger hunt. Benton does not agree with Cleo's approach to an overstressed young high school athlete. Corday takes an extreme measure to help the police and a family whose missing daughter was killed by the rapist. NOTE: Dr. Jing-Mei "Deb" Chen returns to the show after having been a recurring guest star in Season 1.
124	11	"The Domino Heart"	Lesli Linka Glatter	Joe Sachs	January 13, 2000	225461	28.42
A precious donor heart becomes available when a patient who recently received it dies, devastating Lucy. Malucci gathers evidence to shut down a backroom clinic. Carter and Chen disagree on when to follow rules and when to break them. Greene learns a man is being abused by his boyfriend. A water shortage leaves the ER doctors finding creative ways to treat patients. Corday lets the rapist know he has no hold over her anymore.
125	12	"Abby Road"	Richard Thorpe	R. Scott Gemmill	February 3, 2000	225462	27.88
Abby Lockhart, the part-time OB nurse who cared for Hathaway during "Great Expectations", reports to the ER for her third-year med-student rotation. Hathaway has a hunch that a young patient's health problems come from his mother. Carter and Cleo try to help a sick boy and the unpopular student he fought with. Weaver leaves the ER due to the flu, while Malucci works in spite of it and Benton angles Romano's illness into some help for a young girl who was mauled by a dog.
126	13	"Be Still My Heart"	Laura Innes	Lydia Woodward	February 10, 2000	225463	31.33
It's a usual Valentine's Day in the ER with the couples making holiday plans, while an unusual case involves Corday assisting Romano operating on his own dog. Benton, Corday, Kovac, and Hathaway work on a family of four, and are unable to save the parents, leaving the children orphaned. Greene wrestles with Chen and Malucci as they bicker over a patient in their care. Carter helps Lockhart with an elderly patient, while ignoring the warnings of Lucy, who becomes suspicious of her patient, Paul Sobriki (David Krumholtz), and his deteriorating mental state, the end result bringing disastrous consequences as he attacks both of them.
127	14	"All in the Family"	Jonathan Kaplan	Jack Orman	February 17, 2000	225464	39.38
The ER's Valentine's Day activities end abruptly when Dr. Weaver discovers Carter and Lucy lying unconscious on the floor, suffering from multiple stab wounds each, with Lucy worse off. The staff work valiantly to save their colleagues. Benton and Anspaugh repair the damage to Carter while in another operating room, Corday and Romano fail to save Lucy. A devasted Romano ransacks the OR. Later, the schizophrenic patient who attacked them arrives back in the ER after an accident and things take a dramatic turn for the staff, which becomes even more so when the patient's wife arrives looking for her husband. NOTE: Final appearance of medical student Lucy Knight
128	15	"Be Patient"	Ken Kwapis	Sandy Kroopf	February 24, 2000	225465	31.31
A child is injured in a hit and run in front of Kovač (the driver later turns up in the ER), and a teen has cervical cancer after becoming infected with HPV. Lucy's mother comes to retrieve her property – and surprises a still-struggling Carter with her late daughter's gratitude and praises him for his guidance with her. The encounter sends the recovering Carter into a depression. Even a happy event, a romance between Corday's mother Isabelle and David Greene, turns sad when Greene learns his father is terminally ill.
129	16	"Under Control"	Christopher Misiano	Neal Baer & Joe Sachs	March 23, 2000	225466	27.19
"We can handle this." This, it turns out, involves a Gila monster, toxic breast milk, a deadly error and much more as Greene oversees a particularly hectic shift. Carter, despite his pain, returns to work. Chen is attracted to a very handsome male nurse.
130	17	"Viable Options"	Marita Grabiak	Patrick Harbinson	April 6, 2000	225467	27.50
Kovač and Corday must select a recipient while a donor kidney is still viable, and Kovac's moralistic side doesn't impress Corday or settle the argument in his favor. Weaver defies Romano on treating a poorly-insured patient and is suspended. Benton's careless penmanship results in a patient taking the wrong drug, and he blames Finch when the patient ends up in the ER having suffered a heart attack. Chen wants to tell the daughter of a patient about her father's diagnosis of Huntington's disease but Greene puts the brakes on that. Greene has his own conflict with both his father and Corday over David's desire to check into a hospice care center.
131	18	"Match Made in Heaven"	Jonathan Kaplan	R. Scott Gemmill	April 13, 2000	225468	26.01
A notice of Lucy's acceptance into psych residency deepens Carter's depression and guilty conscience. Greene cares for his father amidst his deteriorating health. Hathaway has news from Ross. Abby convinces an overwhelmed mother to go against the wishes of her controlling and unhelpful (but devout) husband with getting an abortion. Kovac helps a bitter divorced father who is facing a horrible diagnosis.
132	19	"The Fastest Year"	Richard Thorpe	Lydia Woodward	April 27, 2000	225469	27.38
Memories. After his father reminisces about his Navy days, Greene takes him on a final boat ride on Lake Michigan. Meanwhile, Carter is haunted by terrifying thoughts of the attack that almost killed him, and has a cordial but inconclusive talk with Paul Sobriki's wife. Kovač helps Hathaway buy a used car, before describing what happened to his family in Vukovar. Abby goes too far when trying to arrange for a bone marrow transplant. Weaver, back from suspension, charms the young son of a hospital nurse.
133	20	"Loose Ends"	Kevin Hooks	Neal Baer	May 4, 2000	225470	26.25
Malucci treats a little girl who was molested by her father. David surprises Corday by giving her a necklace that once belonged to his late wife, with David's illness frustrating Corday as she treats a young woman who's actively trying to kill herself. Hathaway's birthday is anything but happy. Benton and Kovač clash over follow-up care. Carter seems reinvigorated but also ignores the orders of his supervisors. Greene makes amends with David shortly before he passes away.
134	21	"Such Sweet Sorrow"	John Wells	John Wells	May 11, 2000	225471	32.67
Touched by a family tragedy at the ER – a dying DNR cancer patient whom she hopes to keep alive just long enough for her young children to say their goodbyes – Hathaway realizes she must see Ross. Chen notices Carter's increasing unreliability and mood swings. Hathaway admits to Kovač that Ross is the love of her life but she urges Kovač not to stop looking for love. Abby is supervised by Malucci on a case that leads Corday to tell him that no one at County thinks he is any good at his job. Greene urges Carter to therapy. Corday returns the necklace to Greene, who then gives it to his daughter Rachel while showing her her late grandfather's favorite Chicago lakeside spot. Hathaway flies to Seattle and reunites with Ross. NOTE 1: Final regular appearance of Nurse Manager Carol Hathaway NOTE 2: George Clooney makes an uncredited cameo as Dr. Doug Ross. Series creator John Wells wrote the scene and filmed it in secret with only himself, Clooney, Margulies, director of photography Hector R. Figueroa, and one camera operator.
135	22	"May Day"	Jonathan Kaplan	Jack Orman	May 18, 2000	225472	34.59
Kovač and Benton rush to the scene of a school shooting, leading to a confrontation over who is the most critical patient: the shooter or one of his victims. Kovac chooses the victim and Benton is furious at him as the shooter bled to death en route to the hospital. Benton and Corday later perform an incredible surgical feat to save the shooting victim. Carter is discovered by Abby injecting narcotics into his wrist while cleaning up after a trauma. His addiction, now public, becomes a concern not only to the staff, but also their patients. Greene and Weaver, along with Benton, Chen and Anspaugh, stage an intervention in an effort to convince Carter to enter rehab, which he balks at until a violent outburst leaves him crying in Benton's arms. Kovač is left enraged and nearly crosses a line when he can't prove a young pregnant woman stabbed herself to get rid of an unwanted pregnancy.
