= Carol Hathaway =

Fictional character from the television series ER

Carol Hathaway, MSN, RN
- Julianna Margulies as Carol Hathaway
- First appearance: September 19, 1994 (1x01, "24 Hours")
- Last appearance: March 12, 2009 (15x19, "Old Times")
- Portrayed by: Julianna Margulies
- Duration: 1994–2000, 2009

In-universe information
- Gender: Female
- Title(s): Nurse Manager (1994–2000), Transplant Coordinator (2009)
- Occupation: Registered Nurse and Nurse Manager
- Family: Helen Hathaway (mother); Unnamed father (deceased); Unnamed Sisters
- Spouse: Doug Ross (husband)
- Children: Tess and Kate Ross (daughters with Doug, born on November 25, 1999)
- Born: May 8, 1967
- Religion: Eastern Orthodoxy

Carol Hathaway is a fictional character from the NBC medical drama series ER, portrayed by actress Julianna Margulies. She is the nurse manager in the ER. She regularly appeared throughout the series from the pilot episode to her penultimate episode of the show's sixth season. She was mentioned throughout the series and made her final appearance in season fifteen, the show's last season, when she is revealed to have a new career as a transplant coordinator.

== Casting and early character development ==
The character of Carol Hathaway was supposed to die by suicide during the pilot episode of ER. Margulies explained in 2000 that the show's creator, Michael Crichton, "had something like that happen when he was a resident" at Harvard.

However, test audiences who viewed the show before its official premiere reacted negatively to her death. Her character was well-liked by test audiences. Some nurses also protested her suicide attempt, disappointed at how the death of such a strong, confident nurse would represent the profession on television. Foreign buyers of the show, too, were interested in the dynamic between her and the Doug Ross character as he was seen reacting to her suicide attempt in the pilot. As a result of these reasons, it was decided that Carol Hathaway should recover.

Then-unknown actor George Clooney, who had filmed the pilot episode with Hathaway's actress Julianna Margulies, called Margulies to let her know that he had overheard producers saying that her character might survive the suicide attempt after all and become a series regular. He encouraged her to consider waiting for ER producers to call her and not take another job. Clooney was right and Margulies accepted the role of Carol Hathaway on ER in 1994.

That same year, Julianna Margulies said of her character, “[Hathaway] is strong and controlling and that’s why she’s good at her job. She has a dry sense of humor and a very dark side to her that she doesn’t wear on her sleeve. She’s very compassionate, even if she’s dealing with her own demons.”

To prepare for her role as Carol, Margulies observed and shadowed medical professionals at hospitals in Los Angeles and Chicago, including Cook County General Hospital, the hospital that inspired the look of the show's emergency room. She ultimately based Hathaway on two nurses, in particular, whom she had observed working at Cook County General Hospital. Julianna Margulies has said that, when playing Carol, she developed a backstory in her mind that her father's death is the reason that Carol became a nurse.

Margulies initially worried that viewers would see Hathaway as too young to be the head nurse in the ER, but was reassured by the nurses she met that Hathaway's young age made sense considering the stress levels and strength needed for the job.

Margulies also attended nursing conferences as research for the role. In response to Carol attempting suicide in the first episode of the show, Margulies did research on the high rate of drug overdoses in nursing professionals, citing the high stress levels and expectations of the job.

Carol Hathaway is a complex television character. Margulies has said that she pushed for Hathaway to be represented strongly on ER. "The first year it was really easy to write for her, because she was coming from such a low place that she could only go up after a suicide attempt," she said in 1997. “The second year, I felt that they lost sight of Carol Hathaway and that she sort of became a reactionary character to everyone else's life. So I went in [that year] and I said: 'Look, I love this character. I think she is one of the strongest women on television. I think she is an incredible role model for people because she is so human, and why aren't you writing for her?' They all agreed with me completely."

Margulies was also instrumental in keeping Hathaway a nurse on the show, as producers wanted to make her a doctor. While the character does consider medical school, and proves herself to be well-qualified, Margulies felt that making her character a doctor would do a disservice to nurses, who she was proud to represent on television. She also felt it would be out-of-character.

In a 1996 interview with US Magazine, the actress also expressed her disappointment that the show did not dive deeper into Carol's mental health struggles. She said, "[Executive Producer] John Wells says Hathaway’s ratings go up when she’s lighter, and I know they think the show is dark enough. But I think they missed the boat."

However, in 2019, Margulies shared that her role as Carol Hathaway is one of the roles she is proudest of having played. She said, "I loved that character because she was so damaged herself, but she was such a healer to others. To start the beginning of a series having tried to commit suicide and to end up where she did, I think it's beautiful."

== Career ==
Carol Hathaway is a registered nurse and is the nurse manager and charge nurse in the emergency room of Chicago's County General Hospital. In the pilot episode, Dr. Mark Greene refers to her as "very popular" with the staff in the emergency department. She is portrayed as a highly skilled trauma nurse. It is revealed in season two that she holds a master's degree in nursing when she completes a performance evaluation for physician assistant Jeanie. In season one, episode eight, she says that she is also certified to perform forensic exams.

Carol is tough and sensitive towards the lack of recognition the ER nurses experience. She takes her role in the ER seriously and, in one episode, is said by Dr. Weaver to be “the best nurse” they have on staff at County General. However, she does not like to take orders and is sometimes hostile to the physician assistants, as well as the interns.

Carol's high level of skill and knowledge mean that she is often teaching the med students. However, she often feels like her abilities — and the abilities of the other nurses — go unappreciated.

In season 3, Carol decides to attend pre-med classes at a local community college and eventually takes the MCAT exam. When she scores well on the exam, Dr. Kerry Weaver spends a day excitedly teaching Carol med student tasks, such as how to intubate a patient, which Carol does expertly. However, by the end of the day, Carol decides against becoming a doctor. When she helps a mother whose child has died, she realizes that her job as a nurse is worthwhile.

In season 4, Carol decides to open a clinic in the ER, but in season 5, she is forced to step down from overseeing the clinic due to a mistake involving Dr. Ross. She asks the nurse practitioner that she'd hired to help run the clinic, Lynette, to take over, so that the clinic could continue running without Carol's involvement. After the incident, Carol says that she is allowed to keep her job in the ER, but that she is out of management. However, in season six, she can still be seen completing managerial duties.

In Season 15, Carol is shown as a transplant coordinator in Seattle.

== Mental health ==
Carol's mental health is a major plot line and backstory for her character. She attempts suicide in the show's first episode, being rushed into the ER via ambulance after an overdose of barbiturates. The attempt is nearly fatal, but thanks to the aggressive care of her co-workers, she recovers and returns to work eight weeks later.

On her first day back to work, in the season one episode, “Going Home”, Doug asks Carol what was going on in her life to cause the attempt. He feels guilty and fears it had something to do with him. Carol tells him, “there were actually more depressing things going on in my life than you.” She then says, “You know how it is, too much stuff starts piling up and you feel trapped.” She tells him she spends a lot of time discussing these things in therapy and does not want to talk about it anymore.

Episodes later, when Carol's application to adopt an abandoned child is denied due to her attempt, she tells Doug that she feels defective, and that she has worked hard in therapy since that day. At the end of season one, she expresses her fear to Doug that she will never be happy.

The reasons for Carol's suicide attempt are sprinkled throughout the series. She often uses her experience to connect with others. After physician assistant Jeanie Boulet's HIV status is revealed to the staff, Carol privately tells her about her suicide attempt and explains that she knows what it's like to come back to work and have everyone treat you differently. The two were once competitive rivals, but now, she suggests they be friends. Jeanie ends up working in Carol's free ER clinic. In many other episodes, Carol tells her patients and colleagues, when they are in distress, that they have to deal with their feelings and that keeping things inside makes things worse.

She often appears emotionally affected when other patients who have attempted suicide come into the ER. In the episode, "Long Days Journey", Carol helps work to save a woman who does die by suicide. After the experience, Haleh tells Carol that she knows that must have been hard for her to relive. Haleh asks if Carol had written a suicide note like the woman they had worked on. Carol tells her that she did not leave a note, because she did not know what to say.

In season two, episode eight, Carol cares for another patient who has attempted suicide. While working on the girl, she comments to Mark that she “hates this” and is clearly affected by the patient, to whom she later shares the story of her own attempt a year before. After caring for the patient, Shep comments - unaware of Carol's history - that anyone who takes a bunch of pills just wants attention and does not really mean it. Annoyed, Carol replied, “I really meant it,” shocking him and leading him to try to apologize to her several times. Later, in the same episode, he told her that he was glad that she survived her suicide attempt. Carol answered, “Me too.”

In season three, episode eleven, she tells Doug that she remembers how unhappy she used to be. She tells him that she "didn't think much of herself" when they dated before her suicide attempt, but now she "feels good." She explained, "I used to think I couldn't do things. Now, I'm taking a premed course. I guess it's about being in control."

In another season three episode, Carol expresses resentment toward her mother and tells her that she never felt supported growing up.

In season four, episode twelve, she tells paramedic Greg, "I thought of everybody but me when I tried to kill myself. I just got wrapped up in everybody else's expectations of me and forgot who I was. Now, I’m okay. I even tried to go to med school, but it just wasn’t for me.”

Also in the season four episode, “Of Past Regret and Future Fear”, Carol tells Doug that her father suffered from depression. Their conversation hints that his depression may have been a factor in his death, with Carol's mother believing “it was an accident.”

== Seasons 1–3 ==
Shortly after her character is introduced on the show, she is rushed into the hospital after an overdose of barbiturates in a suicide attempt. She had been working on shift just hours prior, making jokes and seeming like herself. The staff is distraught and almost too shocked to work. Dr. Greene has to continually remind them to treat her like any other patient.

In 2021, actress Julianna Margulies recalled her character's first episode. She said, "Whenever my character was at the medicine cabinet getting meds for her patients, she was putting some in her pocket for herself [for her eventual suicide attempt]. Not that they ever paid attention to that. If you re-watch the pilot, you can probably see her pocketing some medication."

Carol's suicide attempt is serious, with the staff at times speaking of her in the past tense, as they do not expect her to survive. Carol is close friends with both Dr. Lewis and Dr. Greene, and the two order aggressive medical care, which results in her miraculously surviving after being comatose for several hours.

Eight weeks after her suicide attempt, Carol returns to work. As she prepares for the day, she is clearly anxious and unsure. When she arrives at work, she is haunted by images of herself being brought into the ER on a gurney. She tries to make jokes to lighten the mood of her arrival.

Carol tells Dr. Greene that her therapist suggested she consider working in a doctor's office instead of the high stress environment of the ER. She wonders if she's returned to work too quickly, but expertly runs a trauma with Dr. Greene that boosts her confidence. She also meets a patient who reminds her that life is a gift, which she vows to take to heart herself.

Although she later denies it, the staff suspects that her suicide attempt was brought about by her failed romance with Doug Ross, a womanizing pediatrician also working in the ER. Carol explains in the third episode of season one, Going Home, that the attempt was actually caused by “things piling up” and feeling trapped.

Also during her first day back, it becomes obvious that while she is still attracted to Doug, she harbours some animosity towards him. She recognizes that Doug feels guilty about her attempt and tells him in the third episode of season one, "there were actually more depressing things going on in my life than you." Carol keeps Doug at a distance in both professional and private matters, which becomes difficult as Doug continually tries to win her back, on one such occasion showing up drunk on her doorstep, with flowers.

In an attempt to move on from her fractured relationship with Doug, Carol plans to marry orthopedic surgeon John "Tag" Taglieri (Rick Rossovich). The relationship is tumultuous from the start, since Carol cannot commit fully to Tag, and against his wishes, she tries unsuccessfully to adopt a Russian child suffering from AIDS who was abandoned in the ER. She is denied because of her past suicide attempt. Carol is devastated and turns to Doug for support. She shares with Doug that she is still in therapy, and has been in therapy for nine months at that point.

In season one, episode nine, after giving advice to a patient to be more honest, Carol tells Tag that she cheated on him with Doug before her suicide attempt and recently kissed him. Tag becomes angry and tells Carol that he has been patient, but her suicide attempt can't be an excuse for all of her behaviors. However, in the next episode, Carol is wearing an expensive engagement ring from Tag.

Right before they are about to walk down the aisle, Tag leaves Carol at the altar, telling her he cannot commit to someone who cannot reciprocate those feelings. While she seems to acknowledge that she and Tag were not a strong relationship, Carol is still hurt, telling Doug in the final episode of season one, "I just want to be happy and I'm so afraid I never will be."

Carol, in an attempt to become more independent and rebuild her life, purchases a run-down row house, which she plans on renovating. As the seasons progress, the house slowly transforms into a vibrant living space, mirroring Carol's work to rebuild her life.

She later becomes involved with paramedic Ray "Shep" Shepard (Ron Eldard), who moves in with her. Despite a promising start, their relationship becomes severely strained after Shep goes through a drastic personality change after the death of his work partner.

Shep and his partner had decided to enter a burning building to save children who were trapped by the fire. Shep's partner was badly burned and later died in the ICU. In response to the death, Shep becomes aggressive and violent. Carol covers for him during an investigation where he seriously injures another person. Carol regrets covering for him, not realizing the gravity of his problems. Despite Carol's attempts to get him professional help, he refuses, so she ends their relationship, telling him that she has finally gotten her life together and can not be with him if he is not seeking therapy for his problems.

== Seasons 3–6 ==
Carol struggles financially. She takes out a second mortgage on her house. Things get even worse when a labor dispute arises concerning the reassignment of her nurses. As nurse manager for the ER, Carol is privy to management decisions, and she finds herself torn between her friends and the hospital administration.

During a nurse sickout, Carol accidentally transfuses the wrong blood into a patient. Although it is unclear whether it was the blood or his other injuries that cause his death, Carol blames herself.

The administration initially does not punish Carol for this incident and uses it to cast the sickout in a bad light, but she resents the administration's actions and believes she is not being punished sufficiently for her error, so she talks to the press and gets suspended.

During her suspension, Carol is held hostage at gunpoint during an armed robbery at her local grocery store. She treats several injured people and performs advanced procedures, including a tracheotomy, using only the supplies in the store. She manages to escape the incident, shaken but unharmed.

Carol is shown taking pre-med classes at a local college, and later takes the MCAT with Doug's encouragement. She assumes she failed, when in fact she did very well. She scores in the 85th percentile, impressing the hospital and leading Kerry to take her under her wing. However, she opts not to pursue medical school, having only taken the test to prove she was capable.

Carol opens up a free clinic in the ER, backed financially by colleague Dr. John Carter's wealthy grandmother. The clinic is a success, helping many in the community.

It is also during this time that Carol and Doug become closer again as friends. Doug, the once-womanizing pediatrician, hits rock bottom, leading a life of celibacy after one of his one-night stands dies from a cocaine overdose. As he straightens out his life, Carol begins to see him differently, and after a surprise passionate kiss on her doorstep, Doug and Carol begin to rekindle their relationship.

Their relationship is held up by Carol's insecurities and bitter memories of the past. Frightened over what the staff might think, Carol and Doug romance each other in secret, even though it is obvious to the staff, who start an office pool over when they will out themselves. Doug's attempts to make up for his past mistakes and commit to her eventually pushes her back.

In season 4, after an intense paramedic ride-along, Carol and paramedic, Greg, have an unexpected conversation about her previous suicide attempt. In the heat of the moment, they kiss. Later, horrified at her actions, Carol confesses to Doug, who leaves her for a while.

In a heated conversation at the hospital soon afterward, Doug accuses Carol of humiliating him. She then proceeds to tell him of the many times when his cheating humiliated her. Ultimately, she is not ready for them to be moving so fast. She emotionally asks him for time and space. He tells her that he will wait.

The two eventually reconcile. Carol overcomes her insecurities and is finally able to put those demons to rest and commit fully to Doug. Soon after, they have a pregnancy scare, and it makes the two of them decide to conceive a child.

Doug's constant run-ins with authority begin to jeopardize not only his job, but also his relationship with Carol, who — despite her devotion — finds it increasingly difficult to support his reckless decisions regarding patient care.

This all comes to a head when a terminally ill boy dies under his care. Using a PCA machine from Carol's clinic, Doug authorizes the mother, Joi, to administer enough pain medication to stop his heart. An ensuing scandal resulting from the police investigation ruins both of their careers.

Carol is forced to give up control of her clinic and Doug is forbidden from seeing patients. Seeing no other way out, Doug resigns, leaving for Seattle to take a lucrative job offer despite Carol's protests.

Doug asks Carol to come with him, but Carol turns him down. She explains that Chicago is her hometown, with her job, family, and friends all in the city. She wants him to stay for her, and emotionally tells him she does not want to wake up without him. However, Doug ends up leaving Chicago alone.

After Doug has left, Carol begins experiencing headaches and insomnia that she at first blames on stress. She soon realizes that she is actually pregnant. She struggles with the emotions of being pregnant without Doug, even though she tells him not to return to Chicago when she informs him of her pregnancy.

She also struggles with the risks of being pregnant while working as a trauma nurse. She is kicked in the stomach by a child, faced with the need to care for a woman who has an infection that is dangerous to pregnant women, and accidentally exposed to an x-ray.

Carol has a difficult pregnancy. She frequently becomes dizzy and twice nearly faints from low blood pressure. She tells Elizabeth that she is suffering from morning sickness and fatigue. She confides in her that she does not want to be a single mother and isn't sure that she wants to continue the pregnancy.

In one episode, Carol is tending to a newborn baby when its mother has a psychiatric crisis and tries to attack Carol for the baby. Carol looks at the patient's baby, whom she has tried to protect, and realizes that she does want to continue with her own pregnancy.

However, her labor is equally difficult, with Carol collapsing on the staircase of the El train and then suffering from dangerous bleeding during delivery.

Despite the problems, Carol delivers twins Tess and Kate Ross on Thanksgiving Day. She is assisted by then-OB nurse Abby Lockhart, as well as by her long-time friend and colleague, Dr. Mark Greene, as her birthing coach.

When Doug learns of his twin daughters' birth via a telephone call from Carol, he again invites them to come and live with him in Seattle. Carol cannot decide if it is the right thing to do; she is still hurt over his abrupt departure a year earlier. She attempts to raise their daughters alone.

After the birth of the twins, Carol struggles to balance child-rearing, her postpartum emotions, and her return to work. She also tells Mark that she knows the girls deserve a father. Mark then says that Doug has been seeing them, implying plane visits from Doug off-screen.

Dr. Luka Kovač, a new Attending from Croatia who lost his wife and children in the Croatian War of Independence, often helps Carol take care of the twins. A tentative romance eventually develops as the two become closer, but Carol does not see it going anywhere. Carol is still focused on Doug and seems to send Luka mixed signals.

In season six, episode twenty-one, treating a woman dying of end-stage ovarian cancer and helping her family say goodbye moves Carol to reunite her own family. She realizes that she has been in love with Doug "since she was 23 years old."

After apologetically saying goodbye to Luka, she abruptly leaves work and flies to Seattle that day to reunite with Doug. It is later revealed that the day after she left Chicago, Carol sent for her twin daughters (who were staying with her mother) to join her and Doug in Seattle. This is the last time she is seen on the show until season 15.

== Future appearances and mentions: Seasons 7–15 ==
When Susan Lewis returns to the ER in season 8, she asks about Carol. The nurses tell her that she got on a plane, sent for the twins, and they haven't seen her since.

In season 9, episode 2, Elizabeth Corday is grieving the death of her husband, Mark Greene. She becomes emotional when she enters the doctor's lounge and sees a photograph of him smiling with some of the hospital staff before his death. Carol is in the photograph.

In the season 11 episode, “The Show Must Go On,” Carol's voice telling him to hurry up is one of the voices that Carter hears in his head as he leaves the hospital.

Eight years after her departure, in the Season 14 episode, "Status Quo", Jeanie Boulet mentions Doug and Carol when she returns to the ER after her ex-husband's death and learns of brain lesions due to AIDS progression in her son. Nurse Haleh Adams says that Doug just sent her a photo of the twins. She says that Carol and Doug are still loving Seattle and that their twin daughters are now in third grade. Jeanie says that she keeps meaning to visit.

In the season 15 episode "The Book of Abby", long-serving nurse Haleh Adams shows the departing Abby Lockhart a closet wall where all the past doctors and employees have put their locker name tags. Amongst them, both the tags "Hathaway" and “Ross” can be seen.

Carol Hathaway appears again in Season 15. She and Doug are practicing together at the University of Washington Medical Center, where Carol is now a transplant coordinator. In the episode, they both wear wedding rings, implying that they are now married. However, Carol introduces herself to the staff in the hospital lounge as “Carol Hathaway,” not “Ross.” Doug and Carol also discuss their now school age twin girls, who Carol says spent the morning complaining about a spelling test.

During the episode, Carol and Doug help a grieving grandmother (Susan Sarandon) donate her grandson's organs. While on the job she meets two current employees at Chicago County General Hospital, Dr. Neela Rasgotra and Nurse Manager Sam Taggart, who reveal to Doug that almost everyone they know at County is now gone. At the end of the episode, Carol receives a call from Chicago that the heart and kidney transplant from their patient was successful and that "some doctor" got the kidney. Both are left unaware that the doctor they helped save is their old co-worker and friend John Carter.

== Character reception ==
Hathaway was originally supposed to die in the pilot episode of ER, but during test viewings of the show before its official premiere, the character tested well with audiences. She was then added as a series regular. In 2014, The Atlantic ranked Carol Hathaway at the top of its list of the 45 most memorable ER characters, referring to her as the most beloved hero on the show.

Carol Hathaway is routinely acknowledged as a character who has inspired generations of medical professionals. Many real life nurses have said that they chose their profession because of Carol Hathaway. In a Vulture piece entitled “The Doctors Made ER Great. The Nurses Made it Radical,” Hathaway's arc on the show is described as “the most compelling and propulsive long-running story of the entire series.”

Carol Hathaway has been ranked many times as one of the best representations of a nurse on television. Entertainment Weekly placed Hathaway in its list of the "30 Great TV Doctors and Nurses.” Parade named her one of the best fictional nurses on television. Some of her most admired moments were listed in Bustle's “11 Reasons Why Carol Hathaway Was the Best TV Nurse.”

The character has been widely recognized for her impact and influence as a strong, complex female character on television during the 1990s era.

In 2022, Carol Hathaway was also featured in the “Great Expectations” podcast episode of Podcast Like It's 1999 with Sleepy Hollow writer Philip Iscove and Game of Thrones writer Bryan Cogman. The episode described her impact as a powerful female character and her role as the heart of the show.

In 2016, a podcast episode of Advanced TV Herstory noted the uniqueness of ER in having a character “attempt suicide and recover, only to be put back into the same stressful workplace.”

The podcast, hosted by Cynthia Bemis Abrams, observed that the character of Carol Hathaway was often more knowledgeable and skilled than the medical students, and that her high expectations for herself made for a worthwhile story arc. Bemis Abrams said, “Her [suicide] incident and return opened up chances for dialogue about life, second chances, protecting yourself from others, and not settling for something or someone who doesn’t meet your expectations.” However, the show also noted that the soap opera nature of her relationships began to take precedent over her career as the seasons progressed.

Boston.com included Carol on its list of the greatest nurses in pop culture, referring to her as a “staunch advocate of the nursing staff” who is “sometimes melancholy” and “occasionally hostile with physician assistants and doctors when she feels that she or other nurses are being disrespected.”

Her relationship with Doug Ross was included in AOL TV's list of the "Best TV Couples of All Time" and in the same list by TV Guide. In 2022, Entertainment Weekly ranked them 33rd on its list of the 100 Best TV Romances of All Time, with Carol noted by the magazine as a nurse who doesn't suffer fools gladly.

In 1995, Julianna Margulies won a Primetime Emmy Award for playing Carol Hathaway. She was the only cast member to ever win an Emmy Award for ER. She continued to be nominated every year that she portrayed Carol as a series regular on the show.

== Legacy ==
In an episode of Leverage: Redemption that starred fellow ER star Noah Wyle, Carol Hathaway is the alias used by the character, Sophie, when she is acting as a nurse.

Carol Hathaway is mentioned in the Chris Carter book, I Am Death, as the reason for the book's character, Sharon, to become an ER nurse.

During an interview on Late Night with Seth Meyers in 2021, actress Amy Poehler shared her desire to meet with Julianna Margulies to ask a list of questions she had about Carol Hathaway.

The character is often referenced in books, blogs, and articles analyzing the creation of complex female characters, as well as the impact of medical characters on the real life profession.
