= 24 Hours (ER) =

- ER episode
- Episode no.: Season 1 Episode 1
- Directed by: Rod Holcomb
- Written by: Michael Crichton
- Production code: 475079
- Original air date: September 19, 1994

Guest appearances
- Julianna Margulies as Carol Hathaway; Christine Harnos as Jennifer Greene; William H. Macy as Dr. David Morgenstern; Holly Gagnier as Tracy Young; Glenn Plummer as Timmy; Vanessa Marquez as Goldman; Yvette Freeman as Haleh; Ellen Crawford as Lydia; Deezer D as Malik McGrath; Abraham Benrubi as Jerry; Scott Jaeck as Dr. Steve Flint; Paul Benjamin as Mr. Ervin; Elizabeth Ruscio as Sarah Logan; Michael Fairman as Mort Harris; Julianna McCarthy as Mrs. Raskin; Troy Evans as Officer Martin; Miguel Ferrer as Mr. Parker; Michael Cavanaugh as Suzanne's Dad; Jeff Doucette as Larkowski; Christine Healy as Administrator; Liz Vassey as Liz; Tracey Ellis as Annette; Shiri Appleby as Ms. Murphy

Episode chronology
← Previous —	Next → "Day One"
- ER season 1

"24 Hours" is the pilot episode of the medical drama series ER. It first aired on NBC in the United States on September 19, 1994. The episode was written by Michael Crichton, adapted from a screenplay he originally wrote in 1974, and directed by Rod Holcomb. The episode was a critical and commercial success, receiving both high ratings (23.8 million viewers on its initial broadcast.) and very favorable critics reactions.

== Plot ==
At Chicago’s County General Hospital, ER chief resident Dr. Mark Greene, asleep in an exam room, is awoken to tend to the drunk Dr. Doug Ross.

A building collapse in the Loop brings a dozen critically injured patients to the ER. Most are successfully treated; Greene informs a man of his father’s death and the man breaks down. Greene meets his wife, Jennifer, and daughter, Rachel, in the cafeteria. Jennifer reminds him of his appointment later that day for a potential new job with a private practice.

Surgical student John Carter arrives for the first day of his ER rotation, and is assigned to Dr. Peter Benton. After a quick-fire tour, Benton demonstrates how to start an IV and suture before he is called away. The inexperienced Carter manages to treat a woman with a hand laceration, and a man with anger issues who shot himself in the leg.

Ross meets his new medical student, Tracy Young. They diagnose a young boy with a stomach ulcer, presumably due to stress from his overbearing mother. Ross flirts with nurse manager Carol Hathaway and reminisces about their past relationship. A woman gives birth in the trauma room.

At his appointment, Greene finds the affluent private practice much calmer than the chaotic hospital, but despite the offer of better pay and less stressful hours, he is unconvinced to leave the ER.

Dr. Susan Lewis shows a patient, Mr. Parker, the X-ray of a mass in his lungs, and tries to assuage his fears of lung cancer. He asks for a frank diagnosis, and she tells him he likely has six months to live, but assures him that nothing is certain; he thanks her for her honesty.

Frequent ER visitor Mrs. Raskin seeks out Greene for medical attention for a hangnail. Hathaway leaves as the ER changes shifts. Carter treats a young woman who is distraught at having crashed her father’s new Cadillac; her father, though angry, is relieved she is okay. Benton scolds Carter for having more patients waiting to be seen. Ross sees to a young boy who has swallowed his mother's house key. Carter treats a girl with stomach pains who insists she is not pregnant. Carter brings in Benton, who determines she has an ectopic pregnancy.

In the cafeteria, Greene and Lewis discuss his job offer. They receive an urgent call and return to the ER to find Ross and most of the staff waiting by the ambulance bay doors. Paramedics arrive with an unconscious Hathaway, who has overdosed on medication in a suicide attempt. The staff manages to stabilize her as the rest of the ER looks on. Greene comforts Ross.

Carter, nauseated by a patient’s stab wound, goes outside for air. He is counseled by Greene, who assures him that he feels sick because he is a doctor who has chosen to keep his feelings, and that Benton was also sick as a med student.

Hathaway remains in a coma. Greene forcefully assures a patient with an ulcer that he does not have cancer. Ross examines a baby with various bruises, brought to the hospital by the babysitter, and calls child and family services. Greene treats a college student with burns on her inner thighs, and ignores her overt sexual advances.

Benton sees a patient with a ruptured aneurysm and severe internal bleeding, requiring immediate surgery. With no surgical teams available, Benton—despite only being a resident—decides to perform the surgery himself; Lewis calls for chief of surgery Dr. Morgenstern. Benton cockily begins his first solo procedure; he finds the bleed and holds it closed until Morgenstern can take over. Morgenstern criticizes Benton’s incision, declaring that a good veterinarian would've done better, but congratulates him for making the right call.

Ross confronts the mother of the battered baby with evidence of her abuse. Benton visits his surgical patient and assures his wife that he will be just fine. Carter sutures a final patient.

With no more patients to see, Benton, Carter, and Greene find places to sleep. Greene lies down and is seemingly instantly woken up again for another day in the ER.

== Cast ==
=== Main cast ===
- Anthony Edwards as Dr. Mark Greene, chief resident of the ER.
- George Clooney as Dr. Doug Ross, paediatric emergency medicine fellow.
- Sherry Stringfield as Dr. Susan Lewis, second-year emergency medicine resident.
- Noah Wyle as John Carter, third year medical student.
- Eriq La Salle as Dr. Peter Benton, second-year surgical resident.

=== Guest starring, opening credits ===
- Julianna Margulies as Carol Hathaway, nurse manager in the ER.
- Christine Harnos as Jennifer Greene, Mark Greene's wife, a law student.
- William H. Macy as Dr. David Morgenstern, chief of surgery and chief of emergency medicine.

=== Guest starring, end credits ===
- Holly Gagnier as Tracy Young, Doug Ross' medical student.
- Glenn Plummer as Timmy Rawlins, one of the ER desk clerks.
- Vanessa Marquez as Wendy Goldman, a nurse.
- Yvette Freeman as Haleh Adams, a nurse.
- Ellen Crawford as Lydia Wright, a nurse.
- Deezer D as Malik McGrath, a nurse.
- Abraham Benrubi as Jerry Markovic, one of the ER desk clerks.
- Scott Jaeck as Dr. Steven Flint, chief of radiology.
- Paul Benjamin as Mr. Ervin.
- Elizabeth Ruscio as Sarah Logan.
- Michael Fairman as Mort Harris, head of the private practice visited by Greene.
- Julianna McCarthy as Mrs. Raskin, a regular patient in the ER.
- Troy Evans as Officer Martin, a police officer.
- Michael Cavanaugh as Suzanne's Dad, the father of the girl who crashed his car.
- Jeff Doucette as Mr. Larkowski.
- Christine Healy as Administrator.
- Liz Vassey as Liz.
- Tracey Ellis as Annette.
- Shiri Appleby as Ms. Murphy, a teen with ectopic pregnancy.
- Miguel Ferrer makes an uncredited cameo as Mr. Parker, the patient with possible lung cancer.

== Production ==
=== Writing ===
The script for this episode was written by author Michael Crichton. It is very heavily based on a screenplay he wrote in 1974, then entitled "EW" (short for Emergency Ward) based on his own experience as an emergency room intern whilst attending Harvard Medical School. No producers showed any interest in his screenplay and so Crichton turned his attention to other projects. He later began a partnership with director Steven Spielberg. Spielberg read the screenplay and was intrigued, expressing interest in adapting it into a movie. However, when Crichton informed him of a book he was writing about dinosaurs, which would go on to be the 1990 novel, Jurassic Park, Spielberg shelved "EW" and worked on adapting the novel into the 1993 feature film of the same name.

After the release of Jurassic Park, Spielberg returned his attention to "EW." Upon considering the potential for there to be a series of several movies based upon the idea, he realised that it may be better as a series of television episodes. He passed the script on to a team at his production company, Amblin Entertainment. Anthony Thomopoulos, then head of Amblin's television division, contacted Les Moonves, then CEO of Warner Bros. Television and told him about the idea for the show and sent the script to them. John Wells, under contract at Amblin at the time, became attached to the project as a producer. He and Crichton discussed the project over lunch, discovering they had very similar ideas on how to approach the series.

Warner Bros. took the project to NBC, together with the 'dream team' of Crichton, Spielberg and Wells. Warren Littlefield, head of NBC Entertainment at the time, liked the project, but there was much debate and controversy among other executives at the network, who were dubious about the nature of the story as well as the number of characters and parallel subplots that they were worried audiences wouldn't be able to follow. NBC offered a chance to make a two-hour made-for-TV movie from the script, which the studio and team rejected. They then tried to get picked up at another network but were unsuccessful, before eventually returning to NBC who greenlit a pilot. Wells contacted previous collaborator, Neal Baer, a qualified doctor, to update the script as a lot of the medicine had become outdated in the almost two decades that elapsed since it was written.

=== Casting ===
The pilot was greenlit only five weeks before shooting had to begin if the episode was going to be made in time to enter the fall schedule. As such, the casting process was very rushed. George Clooney was the first member of the cast to officially sign on. Clooney was under contract at Warner Bros. at the time so was only available to projects at that studio. He was being considered for roles in two separate NBC pilots. John Frank Levey, the casting director, met with Clooney who read one single scene for the part of Dr. Doug Ross. He chose the role on ER over the other pilot offered to him.

The next to be cast was Anthony Edwards as Dr. Mark Greene. He was initially reluctant to audition as he was intending to take a break from acting to focus on directing, but was convinced by his wife and agent at the time. The casting directors and executives were so impressed by his performance that no other actors read for the part, and he was cast immediately. His manager pushed back the feature film he was attached to direct in order for Edwards to be available to shoot the pilot.

Wells was impressed by actress Sherry Stringfield in NYPD Blue, and when she decided to leave that show he asked her if she would be interested in another project. Stringfield was amazed by the script and went to audition. Levey was very impressed with her audition and she was cast the same day.

Noah Wyle, just 23 at the time, was sent the script by his manager before he had the chance to tell her that he wasn't interested in television projects. Unaware that the lengthy script was actually a television pilot and not a feature film, he went to audition for the role of Dr. John Carter. Wyle's final audition was against Raphael Sbarge, the producers' original choice for the role, but he won them over with his performance.

The last part to be cast was that of Dr. Peter Benton. The pilot had already begun shooting and the role had yet to be filled. None of the actors auditioned were felt to be suitable. One of these actors was Michael Beach, who would later go on to have a recurring guest role on the show as Al Boulet during seasons 2 through 6. Eriq La Salle was spotted in a pilot for another project, and was brought in for an audition. He turned up dressed in blue surgical scrubs and performed yoga in the corridor outside the casting office. The casting directors felt he was the best they had seen and therefore La Salle was cast. He then faced the challenge of learning his lines, many of which were long monologues filled with medical jargon, in less than a day before he was required on the set for shooting.

Julianna Margulies was cast as the part of nurse Carol Hathaway originally for the pilot only, after producers saw her guest appearance in another NBC show, Homicide: Life on the Street. It was not initially planned that she appear in any future episodes, as her character was actually supposed to die after the events of the episode. As such, she is credited as a special guest star rather than as part of the main cast. Her performance in the episode and her chemistry with George Clooney convinced producers that she should become a regular character. However, the producers of Homicide also wanted to offer her a regular role. Margulies chose the role on ER and therefore the following episode reveals that Carol did not die and is at home recovering. Co-star Anthony Edwards said in an interview, "I think everybody fell in love with Julianna immediately and her character and it was great that they were able to not kill her off. She was too good to kill, obviously."

=== Filming ===
Crichton's screenplay was virtually unchanged from its original version, other than the fact that Dr. Susan Lewis became a female and Dr. Peter Benton became African-American and roughly twenty minutes of content was removed in order for the episode to be shown in a two-hour slot on television including commercial breaks.

The pilot was shot in the disused Linda Vista Hospital in Los Angeles, California, which had ceased operations in 1990, due to a lack of time and money necessary to construct a set in time for shooting.

== Broadcast ==
"24 Hours" was broadcast on Monday, September 19, 1994 on NBC. It was the only episode of the entire series to air on a Monday; every other episode aired on a Thursday. The 87-minute long episode aired in a two-hour slot. The episode does not feature an opening title sequence, instead crediting the main cast and crew using subtitles at the bottom of the screen at the start of the episode.

When the episode was broadcast in other countries, such as the United Kingdom, it was instead split into two 45-minute long episodes (as "24 Hours - Part 1" and "24 Hours - Part 2") and both featured the standard opening titles. The first episode ends after the scene in which Dr. Lewis talks to the patient who has lung cancer and shows him the X-ray, along with a "To be continued" subtitle. However, the DVD releases in all regions feature the episode in its original format.
