= Transplant coordinator =

Person who helps transfer organs

Transplant coordinator is a healthcare professional – doctor, nurse, or allied health science graduate – who coordinates activities related to organ donation and transplantation. Transplant coordinators can either be Donor Coordinators or Recipient Coordinators.

== Role in donation ==
Deceased organ donation and transplantation involves close networking of medical, paramedical and non-medical personnel. Transplant coordinators are at the centre of this network.

Transplant Coordinators working with donors can also be known as procurement transplant coordinators, donor coordinators, or just procurement coordinators. Donor coordinators are called when a potential organ donor meets criteria for donating organs (for example, severe neurological injury with lack of brain stem reflexes or brain death). The coordinator will complete an on site review of the donors medical records and begin the process of placing organs with recipients if the donor is a candidate. The donor coordinator also takes over the responsibility of ensuring the donor and the donor's organs remain stable for transplant by facilitating the medical management of the organ donor. Donor coordinators are responsible for ensuring that all diagnostic tests for organ placement are completed and work with other healthcare providers to coordinate organ recovery for transplant.

The success of an organ donation and transplant program depends on good coordination and trained transplant coordinators are the key. Donor coordinators are capable of creating a positive environment for the families of brain dead patients. Their role in counseling the families for organ donation is instrumental in making the programme successful. They also help in building a healthy relationship with the medical, non-medical community and the deceased donors' families. Recipient coordinators educate patients about how best to prepare for an organ transplant and how to take care of themselves after the transplant.

== In the United States ==
Transplant coordinators in the U.S. are usually registered nurses, registered respiratory therapists, or other allied health professionals such as physician assistants (PA) or paramedics with several years of experience and additional certification in organ transplantation. Transplant coordinators can work for organ procurement organizations as donor or procurement transplant coordinators to facilitate the management, donation, and placement of organs for transplantation or for hospitals and transplant centers as recipient transplant coordinators to prepare patients for an organ transplant and facilitate the transplant of harvested organs to transplant patients.

Transplant coordinators working with recipients generally evaluate patients for transplant eligibility and work patients up for organ transplant. They also evaluate potential donor organs for transplant suitability and arrange transplant surgery for recipients. A big role of the recipient coordinator is to provide support and education to the patient before, during, and after their transplant. Coordinators also assess, treat, and follow patient progress post-transplant.

Transplant coordinators typically work 12 to 24-hour shifts and must be on call so coordinators can be available 24 hours a day to field new transplant cases.

The salary for a transplant coordinator in the United States varies by experience and location but the average salary is around $72,000 per year. Donor transplant coordinators can expect a salary of around $65,000 a year while those with at least a few years of experience can expect a salary of around $80,000-130,000 per year.

After a minimum of 1 year of working as an Organ Transplant Coordinator or Organ Procurement Coordinator, most Organ Procurement Organizations (OPOs) require the Coordinator to pass the Certified Procurement Transplant Coordinator (CPTC) Exam. The CPTC Exam is a measure of aptitude and knowledge in the field and holds the profession to a high standard.

In the United States, Transplant Coordinators are hired by Organ Procurement Organizations (OPOs).

Graduates in medicine, nursing, and allied health sciences are eligible to become transplant coordinators. Most transplant coordinators are registered nurses or registered respiratory therapists with at least 5 years of experience and additional training in organ donation.

== In India ==
The Government of India passed the Transplantation of Human Organs (Amendment) Act in 2011 which laid down a set of prerequisites for hospitals to get registered as transplant centres. Appointing a transplant coordinator is one of the prerequisites. The Act defines a Transplant Coordinator as a person appointed by the hospital for coordinating all matters relating to removal or transplantation of human organs or tissues or both and for assisting the authority for removal of human organs.

According to the Transplantation of Human Organs and Tissues Rules, 2014, the transplant coordinator shall be an employee of the registered hospital having qualification such as: Graduate of any recognised system of medicine; or Nurse; or Bachelor's degree in any subject and preferably master's degree in Social work or Psychiatry or Sociology or Social Science or Public Health.

== Training programs ==
Providing appropriate educational programs for transplant coordinators is essential to help solve the problem of organ scarcity. It has been proven by the countries having successful deceased donation programmes that transplant coordinators can perform much better if they are professionally trained in the medical, legal, and ethical aspects of organ donation, counseling, networking, communication and coordination.

Structured training programmes for transplant coordinators are available only in a few countries like Spain and India.

Transplant Procurement Management (TPM) is an international educational programme in organ and transplant coordination that counts with the academic endorsement of the University of Barcelona. It promotes knowledge transfer and development of professional competences in organ donation as key factors to maximize donor potentiality and conversion rates.

Using the "learning by doing" methodology, TPM offers a wide range of online, face-to-face and blended courses, providing one with the opportunity to learn how to identify a potential donor and how to manage all the donation and transplantation process following standards of high quality and ethics. TPM offers programmes of various durations.

To address the training needs of this cadre of healthcare professionals, MOHAN Foundation, a not-for-profit organization based in Chennai, has started the "Transplant Coordinators' Training Program". This is the first such structured course in the Asian subcontinent. The courses have been tailored to suit the requirement of the candidates from both medical and non-medical background. This initiative of MOHAN Foundation is supported by the Sir Ratan Tata Trust and Navajbai Ratan Tata Trust.

The objectives of the training program are:

- To train healthcare professionals in the concept of organ donation
- To create a platform for healthcare professionals to share their knowledge and experience in organ donation
- To promote deceased organ donation in a structured, ethical and professional manner
- To create a cadre of healthcare professionals dedicated to "Transplant Coordination" in India and South Asia.
