= John Carter (ER) =

Fictional character in the NBC medical drama

John Carter, M.D.
- ER character
- Noah Wyle as John Carter in 2009
- First appearance: September 19, 1994 (Pilot, "24 Hours")
- Last appearance: April 2, 2009 (15x22 "And in the End...")
- Portrayed by: Noah Wyle
- Duration: 1994–2006, 2009

In-universe information
- Gender: Male
- Title(s): County General: Medical student (1994–1996); Intern (1996–1998); Resident (1998–2001); Chief Resident (2001–2002); Attending Physician (2002–2005, 2009) Other: Chairman, Carter Family Foundation; NGO Volunteer (2003, 2005–2006)
- Occupation: Physician
- Family: John "Jack" Carter Jr. (father); Eleanor Carter (mother); Robert "Bobby" Carter (brother, deceased); Unnamed Sister (mentioned)
- Spouse: Makemba Likasu
- Children: Joshua Makalo Carter (son, with Makemba; stillborn)
- Relatives: John Carter Sr. (grandfather, deceased); Millicent "Gamma" Carter (grandmother, deceased); Chase Carter (cousin)
- Born: June 4, 1970

John Truman Carter III, M.D. is a fictional character from the NBC television series ER. He was portrayed by Noah Wyle and appeared as one of the series' principal characters from the pilot episode until the eleventh-season finale. Carter's career path is one of the main story arcs of the series, beginning as a third-year medical student, becoming a resident, first in surgery and then in emergency medicine, before being promoted to an attending physician.

In the twelfth season, Wyle made guest appearances in four episodes, from "Quintessence of Dust" to "There Are No Angels Here". During the fifteenth season, Wyle again reprised the role for five additional episodes, first returning in "The Beginning of the End" and ending with the series finale. Carter is one of the few characters that appears in the pilot of the show and finale of the entire series.

== Character history ==
Carter arrived at County General as a third-year medical student. His career got off to a rocky start when on his first day at County, he nearly vomited in the emergency room after seeing a critically wounded patient and had to be consoled by Chief Resident Dr. Mark Greene (Anthony Edwards).

Carter had a dedicated and compassionate approach with his patients. Initially interested in surgery, he switched to emergency medicine, much to his mentor Dr. Peter Benton's (Eriq La Salle) initial dismay and disappointment. During his surgical residency, Carter laments on the lack of patient connection, specifically the lack of thorough follow-up and care.

In order for Carter to change from his surgical residency to an emergency medicine residency, he agreed to work without pay. He was part of an influential and wealthy family and did not need a salary, enabling County General to take him on despite the lack of funding for an additional position. As a resident, his confidence grew, and he often went out of his way to help patients. During season 9, Carter revealed that his family made its fortune by selling coal at high prices during the Great Depression.

=== Season 6–8 ===
During season 6, Carter and medical student Lucy Knight (Kellie Martin) are stabbed by patient Paul Sobricki (David Krumholtz), a law student suffering from schizophrenia. Knight dies from her injuries while Carter's injuries leave him with lifelong kidney problems. As a result of Carter's chronic battle with pain, survivor guilt, and resistance to getting help, he eventually develops an addiction to narcotics. He begins making mistakes at work. After Abby Lockhart (Maura Tierney) catches him injecting left-over fentanyl from a trauma into his wrist, Carter's colleagues hold an intervention and Dr. Greene demands that he go to an inpatient rehab center for medical doctors in Atlanta or be fired. Although Carter is initially opposed to going, Dr. Benton convinces him and boards the plane with him.

Upon returning from rehab in season 7, Carter apologizes for his long absence. At the end of the season, Kerry Weaver (Laura Innes) rejects Carter's application for Chief Resident because of his history of addiction, stating that his spiral is too recent for him to take on the pressure of the position. However, early in Season 8 a combination of some reflection by Weaver and a gruesome error by Chen on a case that ended with a patient's death leads her to change her mind and offer Carter the position, which he accepts. Carter and the returned Dr. Susan Lewis have a brief and tepid romance that ends on cordial terms when they recognize they're not in love (and Lewis recognizes that Carter is romantically interested in Abby Lockhart). Carter has family struggles in Season 8, as his grandmother's health declines, his weak father divorces his icy mother, and his mother arrives in Chicago to a hostile reception from her son. Later in the year, Carter recognizes that the death of Mark Greene means he has to be the ER's leader, and he steps up with a strong and impressive showing when a possible smallpox case leads to the ER being quarantined.

=== Season 9–10 ===
During season 9, Carter and Abby begin sleeping together after they are quarantined in the ER for two weeks during an outbreak of monkeypox. Meanwhile, the health of Carter's grandmother continued to decline, and his mother had difficulty accepting her divorce from Carter's father. Worse, Abby and Carter continue to disagree over whether or not Abby, a recovering alcoholic, should be drinking at all, even moderately. These personal issues come to a head when Abby's bipolar brother Eric (Tom Everett Scott) reappears the day Carter's grandmother dies. Abby giving precedence to her duty as a sister marks the beginning of the end of Carter and Abby's relationship.

Unable to shake his grief, Carter decides to join Dr. Luka Kovač (Goran Visnjic) in the Congo without Abby's support. While there, he mended his previous rift with Kovač (due to their feelings for Abby) and they began to understand one another better. When the clinic is overrun by militia, Kovač is threatened by guerrilla soldiers. However, a young soldier recognized Carter as the doctor that tried desperately to save his brother though he ultimately failed. Out of respect for Carter's actions, the guerrillas spare everyone at the clinic aside from an Army soldier they had been treating.

He returned two weeks later in season 10. When Kovač is reported killed in Africa, Carter goes back to retrieve his body, but finds that Kovač is alive but ill with malaria. He arranges for Kovač to be sent home, and sends a letter to Abby ending their relationship. Carter remains in Africa for several months and works in Makemba "Kem" Likasu's (Thandiwe Newton) AIDS clinic. Carter and Kem develop a relationship, and when she gets pregnant with his child he asks her to accompany him to Chicago, where he introduces her to his colleagues.

Kem's pregnancy ends tragically at eight months when she gives birth to a stillborn son in the episode "Midnight". While they are both devastated, Kem struggles to process Joshua's death, and she and Carter's relationship becomes strained.

=== Season 11–12 ===
During season 11, Carter starts building an HIV/AIDS clinic adjacent to County General, with funding from his family's charity foundation. It is named after his stillborn son – "The Joshua Makalo Carter Center." Afterward, he goes to Paris, where Kem is visiting her mother. They reconnect and he offers to go to Africa with her so they can start afresh. She hesitates but later accepts the offer. Carter returns to Chicago and bids farewell to his friends and colleagues.

In season 12, Carter appears in a four-episode arc, working with a fellow doctor in Darfur, Sudan, where he is joined by Dr. Greg Pratt (Mekhi Phifer) and Debbie (Mary McCormack). Pratt informs him that Luka and Abby have reunited and are expecting a baby.

=== Season 15 ===
In the season 15 episode "The Book of Abby", long-serving nurse Haleh Adams shows the departing Abby Lockhart a closet wall where all the past doctors and employees have put their locker name tags. However, Carter's is missing; according to Haleh, he did not want to do it because it was "defacing government property."

Carter later returns in the season 15 episode "The Beginning of the End”, in which he rejoins the ER at County General. He explains to Cate Banfield that he is relocating to Chicago, and is looking to pick up some shifts. She agrees after finding out that one of his teachers at the hospital was Mark Greene. He visits the Joshua Makalo Carter Center. At the end of the episode, it is shown that Carter is on dialysis because of amyloidosis developing from schistosomiasis, which irreparably damages Carter's remaining kidney. He is back in Chicago to be placed on the transplant list. Working in the ER once again, he is shown still to be a good doctor with good judgment, but is still catching up with the latest medicines and techniques being used in the US. Eventually, his condition worsens, causing him to collapse while attending to a patient. While being treated by Dr. Gates and Dr. Archie Morris (Scott Grimes), he goes into V-tach, but is brought back thanks to Morris's quick thinking. He is then transferred to Northwestern Medical Center.

In the episode "Old Times", while a patient at Northwestern, he is visited by Benton, to whom he reveals that his marriage with Kem is going through a rough patch. In the same episode, Benton acts as a back-seat driver and supervises the operation to make sure Carter is well taken care of. Thanks to Benton's thoroughness, which initially annoys the surgeon performing the operation, a complication is resolved and the operation is a success. Unbeknownst to Carter, the kidney is arranged for him thanks to the efforts of his old friends Carol Hathaway (Julianne Margulies) and Doug Ross (George Clooney), who are also unaware that they are helping Carter and only find out that "some doctor" got the kidney.

In "And in the End", the series finale, Carter uses his family fortune to finally open the Joshua Carter Center, a medical clinic for the underprivileged that fits into the plans he announced when his grandmother's will was being read. Kem surprises Carter by attending the opening ceremony, but she is seemingly uncomfortable around him. In a later conversation she tells him that she felt sad in Chicago because it reminded her of their son's death. As she leaves the clinic's opening, she tells Carter to call her to set up breakfast before she flies back to Paris. Carter indicates he might come back to County for good; however, this is potentially contradicted by his earlier idea that he would leave Chicago if it would save his marriage.

In the final scene, victims of an explosion come to County and while tending to a patient he invites Rachel Greene (Hallee Hirsh), Dr. Mark Greene's daughter who is considering going to medical school, to help him, even calling her "Dr. Greene".

== Related characters ==
Early in the series, Carter's plots typically stayed in the realm of the ER.

=== Family ===
Throughout the course of the series (particularly at the beginning of season 8) we meet various members of Carter's wealthy family and see that he is very uncomfortable with coming from money, to the point where he goes out of his way to not talk about his background.

His father, John (Jack) Truman Carter Jr. (Michael Gross) is caring but reserved, and very acquiescent with his wife until he gets tired of her being an "emotional vampire" and divorces her. He and Carter have an awkward relationship; they love each other, but John does not respect his father. Jack recognizes this and keeps some distance from his son as a result. Carter's mother, Eleanor (née Ferguson) (Mary McDonnell), is emotionally distant and cold. Her personality was largely shaped because she blamed herself for the death of Carter's older brother, Bobby, from leukemia.

Carter eventually figures out that much of her sadness comes from this and they briefly become closer, but eventually Eleanor cut ties with her family after Jack divorces her, to the point where John has no idea how to reach her and she refuses to return a phone call he makes after his grandmother (who never approved of Eleanor) passes away. It is noteworthy that neither of Carter's parents is present when he dedicates the Joshua Carter Public Health building in the series finale.

Carter's grandfather, John Truman Carter Sr. (George Plimpton), is disappointed by Carter's career choice, and though Carter respects him, he also resents him. Carter's grandmother, Millicent Carter (Frances Sternhagen), is a benefactor of the hospital, even funding Carol Hathaway's clinic. Carter is very close to his grandmother, whom he calls "Gamma", and intermittently lives at her home. They do occasionally argue, however, usually in regard to Carter's reluctance to participate in matters related to the family foundation; Gamma modifies her will to remove Jack as the head of the foundation and puts John in charge of it, leading to him changing its mission from supporting Chicago arts programs to supporting public health initiatives. Chase Carter (Jonathan Scarfe) is John's first cousin and a "functioning" heroin addict. Carter, with the assistance of his colleague Anna, attempts to detox and rehabilitate him, but fails. Chase eventually overdoses, resulting in severe brain damage. Carter pleads for the family to keep Chase in physical therapy, and Chase improves significantly. Elaine Nichols Carter (Rebecca De Mornay), the ex-wife of another of Carter's cousins, comes to the hospital for treatment for breast cancer and she and Carter have an affair.

=== Romantic relationships ===
Carter had a number of unsuccessful relationships. Significant girlfriends are listed below:

- Liz (Liz Vassey), a patient whom Carter dates during season 1. They have several sexual rendezvous until Carter realizes she has given him an STD. This ends their relationship.
- Harper Tracey (Christine Elise), a fellow med student, dates Carter during season 2. She cheats on Carter very early in the relationship with Dr. Doug Ross. Carter forgives her, only for her to dump him a few months later because Carter tricks another med student in order to get a procedure.
- Abby Keaton (Glenne Headly), a pediatric surgeon from Southside Hospital reassigned to County when Southside closes. Carter and Keaton begin working together eventually embarking on a clandestine relationship that ends when Keaton leaves for a volunteer mission to teach Pakistani surgeons.
- Carter develops a close friendship with Anna Del Amico (Maria Bello) during season 4, but his crush on her is never reciprocated. They kiss only once, when she bails Carter out of jail. She eventually returns to Philadelphia and makes up with her ex-boyfriend.
- Roxanne Please (Julie Bowen), an insurance saleswoman and patient of Carter, the two begin dating in season 5. The relationship falls apart for many reasons, including their busy work schedules, and because Carter falls for med student Lucy Knight. At one point Roxanne confronts Lucy about it, telling her that she thinks Carter's feeling for her is ruining their relationship.
- Lucy Knight (Kellie Martin) and Carter develop a liking for each other. Carter was jealous when Lucy started going out with Dr. Dale Edson (Matthew Glave). Carter and Lucy kiss only once as he decides to break things off owing to her being a medical student. They continued to be friends, until her death in Season 6.
- Elaine Nichols (Rebecca De Mornay) first appears when she comes to the ER from a fender bender. Elaine is Carter's cousin Douglas' ex-wife. Their relationship to Elaine is just sex, though Carter wants more. She stops seeing Carter when she finds out he knows that she has breast cancer. Carter tries to console her but she simply asks to be left alone. Later she moves to Europe for a few months and bluntly tells Carter to not call her when she returns.
- Rena Trujillo (Lourdes Benedicto) and Carter date off and on during season 7 until he finds out that she is still a student and is only 19. He tries to rekindle the romance but she dumps him because she knows he has feelings for Abby Lockhart.
- Susan Lewis (Sherry Stringfield) and Carter first met in 1994 when Susan was a second year resident. Carter had immediately developed a crush on her. After her breakup with another doctor, he had tried to console her with a kiss but she had stopped him. She had then moved to Phoenix, Arizona, returning in 2001. Once back at County the two rekindle their friendship and admit their feelings. They start dating but realize that the earlier spark is now gone, largely due to Carter's feelings for Abby. They split amicably after Susan tells him to "tell Abby."
- Abby Lockhart (Maura Tierney), a nurse in the ER, and Carter become involved during season 9. After a series of personal crises, their relationship finally dissolves when Carter goes to the Congo for several months. When he returns, Abby kicks him out of her apartment and asks for her key back, ending their relationship. After returning to the Congo, he breaks up with Abby a letter, ruling out all chances of reconciliation. They remain friendly until the end of season 11 when Carter leaves County; by the time he returns in season 15, Abby has started her own family with Luka and they have relocated to Boston.
- Makemba "Kem" Likasu (Thandiwe Newton) begins dating Carter in season 10. A French/Congolese AIDS worker in the Congo, Carter meets Kem while working for Doctors Without Borders. They have a passionate, fast-paced romance culminating in Kem's pregnancy. At eight months, she loses the baby and begins to shut down emotionally. Carter proposes, but she does not answer and moves back to Africa. During their separation, they date others, but when Carter visits her while she is in France, they reconcile, and give their relationship another chance. During season 11, we learn Kem and Carter have married but in season 12 Carter is by himself as he returns to Africa to provide medical aid in Darfur and makes ominous non-specific references to how things with Kem aren't good. In the series finale, Kem returns to Chicago to visit the Joshua Carter Center, posthumously named after their son; she and Carter interact awkwardly, and it is implied that they might meet before she flies back to Paris the next day.
- Wendall Meade (Mädchen Amick), a social worker in the ER, with whom Carter has an affair while separated from Kem during season 11. She ends the relationship with him after he admits that he does not love her.

== Notes ==
Other offices
Preceded by Jing-Mei "Deb" Chen	Chief Resident; 2001–2002	Succeeded by Unknown
