= Jeff Cahill =

American film and television actor

- Born: Jeffrey Garold Cahill; December 19, 1968; Northbrook, Illinois, U.S.
- Died: January 18, 2013 (aged 44); Los Angeles, California, U.S.
- Occupations: Film and television actor

Jeffrey Garold Cahill (December 19, 1968 – January 18, 2013) was an American film and television actor. He was best known for playing the recurring role of Tony Fig, the transport dispatcher in the fifth and sixth season of the American medical drama television series ER.

Cahill guest-starred in television programs including Pacific Blue, The Practice, Touched by an Angel, Mad About You, Southland, Philly and Prison Break. He played the recurring role of J. B. Murphy in the sixth and seventh season of the ABC police procedural television series NYPD Blue, and the recurring role of Garrity Hartman in the ABC drama television series Dangerous Minds. He also appeared in films such as The Blues Brothers and The Shadow. Aside from acting, he worked as a visual artist.

Cahill died of cancer on January 18, 2013, in Los Angeles, California, at the age of 44.
