= Rod Holcomb =

American television director and producer (1943–2024)

- Holcomb in 2003
- Born: May 28, 1943; San Francisco, California, U.S.
- Died: January 24, 2024 (aged 80); Los Angeles, California, U.S.
- Occupations: Television director and producer

Rod Holcomb (May 28, 1943 – January 24, 2024) was an American television director and producer, best known for directing the pilot and finale of ER.

Holcomb directed episodes of numerous television series, including Quincy, M.E., The Six Million Dollar Man, Battlestar Galactica, Fantasy Island, The A-Team, The District, Lost, Invasion, Shark, China Beach, Wiseguy, The Equalizer, Scarecrow and Mrs. King, The Devlin Connection, The Greatest American Hero, Hill Street Blues, The West Wing, and Numb3rs.

== Life and career ==
In 1979, Holcomb directed the television film Captain America. In 1994, he directed pilot episode of ER, for which he was nominated for a Primetime Emmy Award and won a Directors Guild of America Award. In 1996, he directed the episode "Last Call" and was nominated for another Primetime Emmy. He returned to the show in 2009 to direct its final episode and received a Primetime Emmy for doing so.

In 1997, Holcomb was announced as the director of a Showtime miniseries titled Dying for Our Country. It aired the next year under the title Thanks of a Grateful Nation. In 2001, he directed the pilot episode of The Education of Max Bickford, and served as executive producer for the overall show.

In 2004, Holcomb served as chair of the Directors Guild of America's television creative rights committee.

Holcomb died on January 24, 2024, at the age of 80.

=== Directing style ===
On his role as a guest director, Holcomb stated:

I generally go in with a clear understanding that the actors have a responsibility to the series [...] They own those roles. They own those characters. My responsibility is to help them become the best actors they can be within those parameters. You’re trying to continue the prosperity and success of that series as well as being an artist.

=== Unreleased works ===
In 1997, Holcomb was announced as the director of an adaptation of Arthur C. Clarke's novel A Fall of Moondust. In 1999, he was hired to direct a WWII drama pilot titled Skylark.

== Filmography ==
Feature film

- Stitches (1985) (Credited as Alan Smithee)

TV series

Year	Title	Director	Executive producer	Episode(s)	Ref.
1994-2009	ER	Yes	No	"24 Hours"	
1994-2009	ER	Yes	No	"Last Call"	
1994-2009	ER	Yes	No	"And in the End..."	
2001-2002	The Education of Max Bickford	Yes	Yes	"Pilot"	
2003	The Lyon's Den	No	Yes		
2006–2008	Shark	No	Yes		
2007-2008	Moonlight	Yes	Yes	"No Such Thing as Vampires"	
2009	Lost	Yes	No	"Jughead"	

TV movies

Year	Title	Director	Executive producer	Ref.
1979	Captain America	Yes	No	
1991	Chains of Gold	Yes	No	
1993	Donato and Daughter	Yes	No	
1994	Royce	Yes	No	
1995	Convict Cowboy	Yes	No	
1998	Thanks of a Grateful Nation	Yes	No	
2000	Hopewell	Yes	Yes	
2003	The Pentagon Papers	Yes	No	
2005	Code Breakers	Yes	No	
2010	The 19th Wife	Yes	No	

== Awards and nominations ==
Primetime Emmy Awards

Year	Category	Title	Result	Ref
1988	Outstanding Directing in a Drama Series	China Beach: Pilot	Nominated	
1995	Outstanding Directing in a Drama Series	ER: 24 Hours	Nominated	
1997	Outstanding Directing in a Drama Series	ER: Last Call	Nominated	
2009	Outstanding Directing in a Drama Series	ER: And in the End...	Won	

Directors Guild of America Awards

Year	Category	Title	Result	Ref
1989	Outstanding Directorial Achievement in Dramatic Specials	China Beach: Pilot	Nominated	
1994	Outstanding Directorial Achievement in Dramatic Specials	ER: 24 Hours	Won	
2004	Outstanding Directorial Achievement in Dramatic Specials	The Pentagon Papers	Nominated	

The Caucus for Producers, Writers & Directors Honors Awards

Year	Category	Result	Ref
2004	Directing	Nominated	
