= Perry Anzilotti =

American television and film actor

- Born: December 11, 1959 (age 66); Chicago, Illinois, U.S.
- Occupation: Actor
- Years active: 1995–present

Perry Anzilotti (born December 11, 1959) is an American television and film actor. He is best known for playing the advertising character "The Cookie Man" in television commercials for Nabisco's SnackWell's campaign with 23 commercial episodes.

== Early life and education ==
Anzilotti was born and raised in Chicago, Illinois. He attended the University of Illinois at Chicago. He subsequently earned a Master of Fine Arts degree from the California Institute of the Arts. In the 2010s, he enrolled in THC extraction classes at the cannabis college Oaksterdam University in Oakland, California.

== Career ==
Anzilotti is best known for his commercial work as "the Cookie Man" in the SnackWell's Cookies TV commercial spots.

Anzilotti played caveman Chang in the ABC-TV series Dinosaurs episode "The Mating Dance". He also made a guest appearance on the FOX TV series Married... with Children as Vito Capone, a local mobster and loan shark to whom Bud, in attempting to shoot an exercise video, becomes indebted. His other television appearances include guest parts on HBO's Curb Your Enthusiasm (Season 1, Episode 4), ABC-TV's Coach and Step by Step, CBS's NCIS and Sydney, NBC's ER (in a recurring role for 22 episodes), Empty Nest, Caroline in the City, Mad About You, Cheers and Seinfeld. Later roles include a short stint on the daytime soap opera, Days of Our Lives, Modern Family, and Brooklyn Nine-Nine.

== Other endeavors ==
Anzilotti went into the edible cannabis business in 2016. He has authored a cannabis cookbook The Incredibles Medibles Cookbook as well.

== Personal life ==
Anzilotti has resided in the Los Angeles, California, metro area.
