= Mark Greene =

Fictional character from ER

Dr. Mark Greene
- Anthony Edwards as Mark Greene
- First appearance: September 19, 1994 (1x01, "24 Hours")
- Last appearance: November 13, 2008 (15x07, "Heal Thyself")
- Portrayed by: Anthony Edwards
- Duration: 1994–2002, 2008

In-universe information
- Title(s): Chief resident (1994–1995); Attending physician (1995–2002)
- Occupation: Emergency physician
- Family: David Greene (father, deceased); Ruth Greene (mother, deceased)
- Spouses: Jennifer "Jen" Greene-Simon (divorced); Elizabeth Corday (widowed)
- Children: Rachel Greene (daughter with Jennifer, born on February 16, 1987); Ella Greene (daughter with Elizabeth, born on April 28, 2001)

Mark Greene, M.D. is a fictional character from the American medical drama series ER. Portrayed by actor Anthony Edwards, he first appeared in the series' pilot episode, as well as subsequently appearing as one of the principal characters until the end of the eighth season. Edwards later returned to make a guest appearance in the fifteenth season episode "Heal Thyself".

Considered to be the lead protagonist of the series’ first eight seasons, Greene's role was that of a mediator and occasional authority figure. He begins the series as the ER's chief resident, before being promoted to an attending physician. He became the only member of the original set of main characters who died during the series.

== Character background ==
Mark Greene, an only child, was raised by his mother, Ruth (portrayed by Bonnie Bartlett), and father, David (portrayed by John Cullum). David Greene served in the United States Navy, and thus the family moved frequently and lived all over the country, including Jacksonville, Florida, Norfolk, Virginia, Corpus Christi, Texas, Washington D.C., Kings Bay, Georgia, and Hawaii, where they spent three years, David's longest assignment. Greene had a difficult relationship with his father; as a youth he rebelled to upset his father and he set goals different from what he believed his father wanted. He felt his father favored his Navy career over his family, only to learn in adulthood that David turned down a promotional track to admiral to come home and help Greene deal with a bully. The family's time spent in Hawaii was the most memorable for Greene and he attempted to recreate this with his daughter Rachel during the last few weeks of his life.

During high school Greene developed a romantic relationship with Jennifer, who would go on to become his first wife. Their daughter, Rachel, was born shortly after they married. During medical school he met and befriended future colleague Doug Ross. Greene completed his internship and residency in the Emergency Department of County General Hospital in Chicago, Illinois, and then became Chief Resident of the Emergency Department. Greene developed close friendships with Susan Lewis and Carol Hathaway, and continued his friendship with Ross. Greene's marriage to Jennifer is strained by his workload and by her decision to complete law school, which monopolizes much of her time.

== History ==
In the pilot episode, which takes place on St. Patrick's Day 1994, Greene, the chief resident, is awakened in the first scene to help Ross, the emergency pediatric fellow who often comes in on his nights off to sober up after carousing. His close friendship with Lewis is also shown as they confide in each other about their personal lives while on break. During the same episode, Jennifer convinces Greene to visit a private practice near the hospital in hopes he will change careers for more family-friendly hours. Greene decides against this career change. During his night shift at the ER, Greene urges the staff to return to work after Hathaway is rushed in due to a suicide attempt.

During the first season, Greene's marriage is increasingly strained. When offered an attending physician's position by David Morgenstern, Greene accepts. Jennifer has been clerking for a judge in Milwaukee and becomes increasingly tired of commuting and living separately to accommodate Greene's career. She begins an affair with a coworker, and the marriage soon ends, with Rachel and Jennifer leaving Chicago first for Milwaukee and later for St. Louis.

In "Love's Labor Lost", Greene miscalculates treatment of a pregnant woman that leads to her death in childbirth; the aftereffects of Greene's judgment continue into the second season.

Mark and Susan have their picture taken in a photo booth (1996).

In "A Miracle Happens Here", a Christmas episode, Greene explains that he is the son of an agnostic Jew and a lapsed Catholic. He lights a Hanukkah candle for a Holocaust survivor. Greene understands some Yiddish.

Greene's administrative position requires him to make decisions that periodically alienate his friends, such as selecting Kerry Weaver for Chief Resident over another applicant, angering Lewis as the other applicant is friends with Lewis and Weaver is widely disliked. Greene's friendship with Ross becomes strained as Greene's administrative responsibilities put him at odds with Ross.

His romantic feelings for Lewis grow but she leaves the hospital for a job in Phoenix, Arizona. He suffers psychologically after he is attacked and severely beaten in a hospital restroom in the episode "Random Acts". The attack is initially believed to have been carried out by Christopher Law, the brother of a patient who died after Greene treated him for a gunshot wound. Law claims Greene failed to save his brother's life because of his race, as Greene had incorrectly assumed Law and his brother were gangbangers. Later, the show implies the assailant was a psychotic individual who was randomly attacking doctors; Greene's attacker is never caught. After the attack Greene buys a gun and, in an uncharacteristic moment, threatens a group of teenagers with it who were harassing and following him on a train platform; soon after, Greene throws the gun into the river. Greene struggles through a large part of season 4 but comes to terms with his attack in season 5 when he helps Nigerian-born janitor Mobilage Ekabo reveal Ekabo's memories of torture by talking about Greene's own attack with Ekabo, allowing Ekabo to obtain political asylum and avoid deportation.

Greene and Ross travel to California to settle Ross' father's affairs after he died in a car accident; they also visit Greene's parents. Greene's mother is suffering from medical conditions associated with her age and Greene's relationship with his father, David, is awkward. Greene also learns that his mother, Ruth, married David without knowing him well after learning she was pregnant. Greene's distrust of the Navy puts him at odds with David when the two argue over whether Ruth should be treated in a naval hospital or a civilian hospital. Ruth eventually dies and Mark attends to her funeral. Greene then clashes with Kerry Weaver after Weaver supports Robert Romano's bid to become chief of the ER, when the two had already agreed to oppose it.

Greene's personal life after his marriage ends is tumultuous. He engages in several flings, including with nurse Chuny Marquez. In one instance, Greene sets up three dates in one day, which results in disaster when the three women all find out. He has a brief relationship with desk clerk Cynthia Hooper (played by Mariska Hargitay) in season 4. Hooper tries to rush the relationship, causing Green to pull back. But later, fearing being alone, he tries to reconcile with her, but she refuses when she accepts he does not love her.

Greene eventually meets visiting British surgery fellow Elizabeth Corday. Greene and Corday begin a healthy, stable relationship in season 5.

During season 6, Mark's mother passes away unexpedtedly and months later, Greene learns that David is suffering from advanced lung cancer. After David realises he can no longer live alone, he moves to Chicago to live with Greene. Father and son reach an emotional bonding that heals the difficult relationship from Mark's youth, and David eventually succumbs to his cancer.

Greene and Corday move in together, become engaged and get pregnant. But their happiness is short-lived when Mark discovers he has a brain tumour. Initially diagnosed as inoperable, the two travel to New York, where they are given hope when a specialist surgeon agrees to operate.

Mark's surgery is a success, and he and Elizabeth marry and have a daughter, Ella. Their happiness is threatened when the abusive father of a patient goes on a murderous rampage after social services take his son at Greene's prompting. The father kills and injures a number of people but is stopped before he can attack Corday and Ella. After being shot by an armed bystander, the father is brought to the ER. During the father's treatment, Greene takes him aboard an elevator on the way to an operating room. The father goes into cardiac arrest and Greene withholds defibrillation, allowing him to go into ventricular fibrillation and die. Greene falsifies records to show that he attempted to save the patient.

Later, Greene's daughter Rachel appears in Chicago unannounced, citing arguments with her mother, and moves in with Greene and Corday. Ella overdoses on drugs she finds in Rachel's backpack in season 8, putting a strain on the marriage and Greene's relationship with Rachel.

== Character illness and death ==
While suturing a patient's wound, Greene loses control of his faculties and is temporarily unable to speak. After a CT scan and a biopsy, he is diagnosed with an aggressive form of brain cancer, glioblastoma multiforme, that is thought to be inoperable. Embarrassed, Greene briefly tries to hide his condition, but his cover is blown when he has a seizure while arguing with Carter.

With little time, Greene seeks a second opinion from an eminent New York City neurosurgeon, Dr. Burke. Greene is told that the tumor is near a critical section of his brain but has not "invaded" it yet and they can perform an operation on New Year's Eve 2000. Greene's surgery is performed by Burke and things appear to be positive, although it takes him a while to return to his old self. A year or so later, however, Greene finds out his tumor has returned, and Dr. Burke both confirms this and says he cannot operate again because the tumor regrowth is now in part of his brain where an operation would render Greene completely vegetative.

At this point, Rachel has run away from Jen in St. Louis and is staying with Mark and Elizabeth. Though she vehemently denies it, her recreational drug use becomes apparent when her sister Ella gets hold of some ecstasy in her backpack and nearly dies after ingesting it in the episode "Damage is Done".

When Rachel shows up, Mark can barely control his anger at her, berating her for repeatedly lying to him and for putting Ella in danger. However, he sees her remorse and fear for Ella are genuine. Knowing that Elizabeth is angry enough for both of them, he hugs Rachel when she starts to cry. When Mark refuses to throw Rachel out of the house, Elizabeth says she will not return home with Ella as long as Rachel is there and leaves home with Ella and moves into a hotel. Unwilling to tell Elizabeth about his condition, Mark stays with Susan (who at this point had returned to County General) during the course of his chemotherapy and radiation treatments. Elizabeth later finds out the truth and wants to come home, but Mark tells her she should not pretend to be his wife just because he is sick. However, she returns anyway and begins helping Mark as his illness advances. Mark suffers additional medical problems and his time in the ER comes to an end. Eventually, however, he resigns himself to his fate and decides to halt the debilitating chemotherapy, deciding he would rather have three good final months than twice that suffering from his treatments.

On his last day in the ER, he meets the same older woman that viewers saw on the first episode of ER. She again has a hangnail and complains about how painful it is. Greene tells her that he has an inoperable tumor, asks another doctor to treat her, and tells the patient not to return to the ER again. He leaves the ER, stops his chemotherapy treatments, tells John Carter that he will now "set the tone" and takes Rachel on a last-minute trip to Hawaii to rebuild his relationship with her and relive happier times.

After several moves around the island and some conflict with a surly Rachel, Mark has increased symptoms, including a seizure while walking with Rachel, prompting her to call Elizabeth, who comes to Hawaii with Ella. One night, Rachel comes to her father's room while he sleeps. Mark awakens and smiles at Rachel, telling her with slurred speech that he was just dreaming of her and how she used to love balloons. He tells her that he was trying to think of a piece of advice that every father should tell his daughter, and tells her to be generous with her time, her love, and her life. Rachel tells her father that she remembers a lullaby that Mark used to sing her when she was a baby and slips a pair of headphones on his head and plays Israel Kamakawiwo'ole's rendition of "Over the Rainbow" for him as he smiles and falls back asleep. While the song plays, he is seen walking through an empty ER. The next morning, Elizabeth discovers that he has died.

In the episode "The Letter", Carter discovers two faxes that had arrived earlier, both sent by Elizabeth. He reads the first one to the staff. It is a letter that Greene had written about his sentiments about the ER where he had worked for many years, and the staff he had worked with throughout the years. They begin discussing his letter until Susan notices that Carter is holding the second fax, visibly upset. He informs them that the second is a brief letter written by Elizabeth, notifying them that Mark had died that morning.

She explains that she sent the first letter to show the staff at the ER what he thought of them. As the staff responds sadly to this news, Frank asks if he should post the second fax on the staff bulletin board, and Carter tells him to post both of them. The letter and the news of his passing send many of the ER's staff that day into emotional turmoil, with Kerry Weaver going from second-guessing Abby's posting of the letter (she quickly changes her mind and says it should stay up) to crying and stating her regrets to Sandy Lopez that she has lost a friend.

Greene's body is returned to Chicago, where he is buried. Many of his friends and colleagues come to the funeral: John Carter, Peter Benton, Kerry Weaver, Abby Lockhart, Luka Kovač, Susan Lewis, Jing-Mei Chen, Robert Romano, Jerry Markovic, Lydia Wright, Frank Martin, Donald Anspaugh, William "Wild Willy" Swift (played by Michael Ironside in 1994), Haleh Adams, Michael Gallant, Cleo Finch, Jen, Rachel, Ella, and Elizabeth.

After the funeral, Rachel asks Elizabeth if she can visit to see Ella; Elizabeth responds "Of course, she's your sister." Rachel then suddenly asks the driver to pull over: she walks to a bunch of balloons attached to a fence, takes a purple one, and slowly lets go of it, watching it rise toward the sky.

Rachel goes back to living with her mother in St. Louis but later returns to Chicago when the time comes to select a college, as well as asking a bemused Elizabeth to help her acquire effective birth control pills.

In the April 2009 ER series finale, Rachel returns to County General to interview for a position as a med student, showing that she has become a responsible young woman and followed in Mark's footsteps.

== Epilogue ==
It was reported that Dr. Mark Greene was written out of the series because actor Anthony Edwards had decided that he wanted to move on to other opportunities and spend time with his family.

In season 9, episode 2, Elizabeth Corday is grieving his death. She becomes emotional when she enters the doctors' lounge and sees a photograph of him smiling with some of the hospital staff before his death. Greene was also shown in an old Christmas photo in season 10's "Freefall," alongside Drs. Lockhart, Lewis, Carter, and Kovac. He appears in photos included in the slideshow shown at Dr. Carter's farewell party in the season 11 episode "The Show Must Go On".

Greene was also heard in a voice-over telling Carter that he needed to "set the tone" in the ER as Dr. Morgenstern told Dr. Greene himself in the pilot episode.

In the season 12 episode "Body and Soul," he is mentioned during a flashback to 2002, when Dr. Pratt tells patient Nate Lennox (James Woods) that the reason the ER has few staff working is that they are at Greene's funeral.

In season 14's "Blackout," Nurse Chuny Marquez expresses incredulity that the ER will be led by young physicians Dr. Pratt and Dr. Morris, versus Dr. Greene and Dr. Ross. Nurse Samantha Taggart, who started working at County General only after Dr. Greene's and Dr. Ross's tenures, asks, "Who?"

== Return to the series ==
In 2008, ER producers announced that Edwards would reprise his role for the series' final season, with Dr. Greene appearing in flashbacks in the episode "Heal Thyself" shedding light on Dr. Catherine Banfield's (played by Angela Bassett) past.

On November 13, 2008, more than six years after his exit from the show, Anthony Edwards returned as Dr. Mark Greene. The flashback episode took place in 2002, just months before Greene's death, and revealed an encounter he had with Catherine Banfield, six years before she began working in that same emergency room. He was treating Banfield's son Darryl who had a debilitating disease that turned out to be leukemia. The story appeared to take place at the point in season 8 when Mark and Elizabeth were reconciling after she learned his tumor had recurred. Greene takes on the case to save the 5-year-old. He has a run-in with Kerry Weaver and Robert Romano about putting this case ahead of his chemo treatment which took a toll on him throughout that day. Darryl dies in the ER but it was Greene's actions that triggered Catherine in the present day to help save a young girl from drowning and may have also inspired her to work full-time at County. During their encounter, Cate kept pressing Greene, who told her to stop being a doctor and to start being a mother. Cate gave the same advice to the young girl's mother.

In the season 15 episode "The Book of Abby", long-serving nurse Haleh Adams shows the departing Abby Lockhart a closet wall where all the past doctors and employees have put their locker name tags. Among them, the tag "Greene" can be seen.

Other offices
Preceded by Unknown	Chief Resident; 1994–1995	Succeeded by Kerry Weaver
