= ER season 2 =

ER
- Season 2
- DVD cover
- Starring: Anthony Edwards; George Clooney; Sherry Stringfield; Noah Wyle; Julianna Margulies; Gloria Reuben; Eriq La Salle
- No. of episodes: 22

Release
- Original network: NBC
- Original release: September 21, 1995 – May 16, 1996

Season chronology
- ← Previous; Season 1 Next → Season 3

The second season of the American fictional drama television series ER first aired on NBC from September 21, 1995, to May 16, 1996. The second season consists of 22 episodes.

== Plot ==
Greene's attempts at balancing his work and family after moving to Milwaukee comes to an abrupt end when his wife is caught cheating on him with a colleague, the divorce becomes final and he starts dating again. At work, he is promoted, becoming an attending physician. He locks horns with close friend Dr. Doug Ross, whose reckless professional behavior is called into question by the hospital authorities, and new Chief Resident, Dr. Kerry Weaver. Ross breaks protocol to treat an HIV-positive child and is about to be fired. He has already accepted a job at another medical facility when he heroically saves a child, trapped in a sewer in the landmark episode "Hell and High Water". His heroism creates a media sensation and the hospital reconsiders its decision when Dr. Ross receives an award for outstanding community service. Later in the season, his father returns, and while attempting to bond his father again walks out on him. While tracking him down Doug becomes embroiled in a relationship with his father's girlfriend.

Lewis is left holding the baby when her sister, Chloe, skips town, leaving daughter Suzie in Susan's care. She struggles to find time to care for the child and complete her residency. She considers having Suzie adopted, but at the last minute decides to keep her. Just as Susan starts to become attached to the baby, Chloe returns, a changed woman, and a short custody battle ensues. Eventually, Susan hands Suzie over to Chloe and is left devastated when her sister and her new husband move to Phoenix, taking the baby with them.

Carter, now a fourth-year medical student, starts a relationship with medical student Harper Tracy. He becomes involved in the treatment of an elderly patient and her husband (played by comic Red Buttons) in order to secure his place in developing a new heart procedure study and a spot in the surgical program. After the surgery is complete, the woman's condition deteriorates and Carter is overwhelmed by the husband's constant needs. The woman's subsequent death results in tremendous personal guilt, but Carter still manages to win a place as a surgical intern despite the fierce competition. Hathaway becomes involved with paramedic Ray "Shep" Shepard. Their relationship develops quickly and they move in together. However, things go wrong when Shep's partner, Raul, suffers third degree burns to over 85% of his body during a fire rescue and dies shortly afterward, resulting in emotional crisis and guilt for Shep. Shep grows volatile and violent, and after he refuses Carol's recommendation that he see a psychiatrist, the couple separates.

At the start of the season, Dr. Benton is in a relationship with Jeanie Boulet. She ends the relationship in a bid to save her marriage, but soon starts working as a physician assistant at County General. Benton is frosty towards her and is angry when he finds out about her divorce from her husband. At the end of the season, Jeanie finds out that she may be HIV-positive after her ex-husband, Al, is diagnosed. She informs a dismayed Peter and suggests that he too be tested. Benton also struggles to decide whether to lodge a formal complaint against his mentor Dr. Vucelich, when he discovers irregularities in his research method.

== Production ==
First season executive producers John Wells and Michael Crichton reprised their roles. Wells continued to serve as the series head writer and showrunner. Lydia Woodward and Mimi Leder returned as co-executive producers. New producer Carol Flint filled the third co-executive producer position following the departure of Robert Nathan. Christopher Chulack continued to act as the episodic producer. Paul Manning and Wendy Spence Rosato also continued in their first season roles as producer and associate producer respectively. Several changes occurred with the production team mid-season – Leder left the crew, Manning was promoted to supervising producer, and Spence Rosato was promoted to co-producer.

Wells, Woodward, Flint, and Manning continued to regularly write episodes, with each contributing to four episodes this season. First season regular writers Neal Baer and Lance Gentile became story editors for the second season and continued to write episodes. Baer contributed to two episodes while Gentile continued to act as the series medical consultant and wrote a further episode. Both were promoted to executive story editors by the close of the season. First season writer Tracey Stern also returned and contributed a further episode. First season technical adviser Joe Sachs reprised his role and also made his television writing debut on the second season. The series other new writers were Belinda Casas Wells and Anne Kenney; Casas Wells contributed to the story of an episode and Kenney wrote a single episode.

Leder and Chulack continued to regularly direct episodes. Returning first season directors Félix Enríquez Alcalá and Donna Deitch each directed further episodes in the second season. New directors Thomas Schlamme and Lesli Linka Glatter each contributed two episodes this season. Crew members Lance Gentile and Director of Photography Richard Thorpe both made their episode directing debuts this season. Cast member Anthony Edwards also directed his first episode. Other directors new to the series include Eric Laneuville, Dean Parisot, Whitney Ransick, and Barnet Kellman.

== Cast ==
=== Main cast ===
- Anthony Edwards as Dr. Mark Greene – Attending Emergency Physician
- George Clooney as Dr. Doug Ross – Pediatric Emergency Medicine Fellow
- Sherry Stringfield as Dr. Susan Lewis – Third-year ER Resident
- Noah Wyle as John Carter – Fourth-year Rotating Medical Student
- Julianna Margulies as Nurse Carol Hathaway – RN and Nurse Manager
- Gloria Reuben as Jeanie Boulet – Physician Assistant (PA-C, ER) (main: episodes 6−22; recurring: episodes 1−3)
- Eriq La Salle as Dr. Peter Benton – Third-year Surgical Resident

=== Supporting cast ===
Doctors and medical students

- William H. Macy as Dr. David Morgenstern – Chief of Surgery and Emergency Medicine
- Amy Aquino as Dr. Janet Coburn – Chief of Obstetrics and Gynecology
- CCH Pounder as Dr. Angela Hicks – Surgical Attending Physician
- Laura Innes as Dr. Kerry Weaver – Chief Resident
- Ron Rifkin as Dr. Carl Vucelich – Cardiothoracic Surgeon
- Scott Jaeck as Dr. Steve Flint – Chief of Radiology
- Christine Elise as Harper Tracy – Third-year Medical Student
- Matthew Glave as Dale Edson – Fourth-year Medical Student
- Michael Buchman Silver as Dr. Paul Meyers – Psychiatric Resident
- Megan Cole as Dr. Alice Upton – Pathologist
- Perry Anzilotti as Dr. Ed – Anesthesiologist
- Michael Bryan French as Dr. MacGruder
- Pierre Epstein as Dr. Bradley – Chief of Staff
- David Spielberg as Dr. Neil Bernstein – Chief of Pediatrics
- Richard Minchenberg as Dr. P.K. Simon

Nurses

- Ellen Crawford as Nurse Lydia Wright
- Conni Marie Brazelton as Nurse Conni Oligario
- Deezer D as Nurse Malik McGrath
- Laura Cerón as Nurse Chuny Marquez
- Yvette Freeman as Nurse Haleh Adams
- Lily Mariye as Nurse Lily Jarvik
- Vanessa Marquez as Nurse Wendy Goldman
- Suzanne Carney as OR Nurse Janet

Staff, paramedics and officers

- Abraham Benrubi as Desk Clerk Jerry Markovic
- Kristin Minter as Desk Clerk Miranda "Randi" Fronczak
- Charles Noland as Desk Clerk E. Ray (E-Ray) Bozman
- Rolando Molina as Desk Clerk Rolando
- Ron Eldard as Paramedic Ray "Shep" Shepard
- Carlos Gomez as Paramedic Raul Melendez
- Małgorzata Gebel as ER aide (Dr.) Bogdana 'Bob' Romansky
- Emily Wagner as Paramedic Doris Pickman
- Montae Russell as Paramedic Dwight Zadro
- Lyn Alicia Henderson as Paramedic Pamela Olbes
- Scott Michael Campbell as EMT Reilley Brown
- Lee Sellars as Chopper EMT
- Mike Genovese as Officer Al Grabarsky
- Chad McKnight as Officer Wilson

Family

- Christine Harnos as Jennifer "Jenn" Greene
- Yvonne Zima as Rachel Greene
- Kathleen Wilhoite as Chloe Lewis
- Paul Dooley as Harry Lewis
- Valerie Perrine as Cookie Lewis
- Michael Mahon as Joe (Chloe's Boyfriend)
- Michael Beach as Al Boulet
- Khandi Alexander as Jackie Robbins
- Ving Rhames as Walter Robbins
- James Farentino as Ray Ross
- Piper Laurie as Sarah Ross

=== Notable guest stars ===
- Mary Mara as Loretta Sweet
- Jake Lloyd as Jimmy Sweet
- Andrea Parker as Linda Ferrell
- Lucy Liu as Mei-Sun
- Joan Pringle as Hyams
- Red Buttons as Mr. Rubadoux
- Ja'net Du Bois as Macy Chamberlain
- Lindsay Crouse as Dr. Anna Castiglioni
- Scottie Pippen as himself
- Richard Schiff as Mr. Bartoli
- Joanna Gleason as Iris
- Marg Helgenberger as Karen Hines
- Robert Picardo as Mr Zimble
- Adam Goldberg as Joshua Shem
- Guillermo Díaz as Jorge
- Carol Ann Susi as Pregnant Alien-Abductee
- Bradley Whitford as Sean O'Brien
- Michael Cudlitz as Firefighter Lang

== Episodes ==
No. overall	No. in season	Title	Directed by	Written by	Original release date	Prod. code	US viewers (millions)
26	1	"Welcome Back, Carter!"	Mimi Leder	John Wells	September 21, 1995	457201	37.5
Carter is hours late for his first day as a surgical intern and Benton's not happy about it. Lewis tries to help Chloe and Baby Suzie. Greene has two choices for the new Chief Resident post. Kerry Weaver is chosen as Chief Resident of the ER. Also, Hathaway treats a man after he is found drowning in his own vomit. NOTE: First appearance of Dr. Kerry Weaver
27	2	"Summer Run"	Eric Laneuville	Lydia Woodward	September 28, 1995	457202	33.7
Hathaway goes on a ride-along with paramedics to get her recertification. Ross deals with a troubled child who sets things on fire to gain attention. Greene appoints Kerry Weaver as Chief Resident and she clashes with Ross.
28	3	"Do One, Teach One, Kill One"	Félix Enríquez Alcalá	Paul Manning	October 5, 1995	457203	35.6
Lewis is left to take care of little Suzie when Chloe leaves town. Carter loses his first official patient. Greene decides to avoid the hassle of his daily commute by staying with Ross.
29	4	"What Life?"	Dean Parisot	Carol Flint	October 12, 1995	457204	35.5
Benton hurts his hand in a fight in a parking garage, which allows Carter to take his place in surgery. Lewis considers adoption and comes to better terms with Weaver.
30	5	"And Baby Makes Two"	Lesli Linka Glatter	Anne Kenney	October 19, 1995	457205	35.3
It is Weaver's day off. Lewis decides to keep little Suzie. Ross gets some help from Harper when caring for a four-year-old AIDS patient and clashes with Greene over the case. Benton treats a woman who has been abused by her husband – a cop.
31	6	"Days Like This"	Mimi Leder	Lydia Woodward	November 2, 1995	457206	35.3
Ross might lose his job after he runs afoul of the Pediatrics Chief. Harper has a confession to make. Jeanie Boulet starts working in the ER as a Physician's Assistant, but the relationship between her and Benton remains hostile. Hathaway buys her first house.
32	7	"Hell and High Water"	Christopher Chulack	Neal Baer	November 9, 1995	457207	42.0
Ross accepts a private practice position, but finds his inner hero when he helps a little boy trapped in a storm drain. Carter and Harper remain estranged during a case where a child is hit by a car and her divorced parents arrive at the ER.
33	8	"The Secret Sharer"	Thomas Schlamme	Paul Manning	November 16, 1995	457208	39.4
Benton learns that Boulet has filed for divorce. Carter and Harper reconcile. A patient's situation nearly blows up in Carol's face, and she tells Shep about her suicide attempt. Lewis' father surprises her with a generous offer. Ross is considered a hero and his fellowship is renewed.
34	9	"Home"	Donna Deitch	Tracey Stern	December 7, 1995	457209	35.0
Greene rushes to Milwaukee after hearing his wife and daughter were in a car accident only to receive some more surprising news. Carol treats a kind young artist who has schizophrenia. Lewis puts Suzie ahead of an opportunity to present a case at a medical conference.
35	10	"A Miracle Happens Here"	Mimi Leder	Carol Flint	December 14, 1995	457210	34.9
Christmas becomes a time for miracles for both patients and the ER staff. Hathaway hosts the Christmas party and receives a surprising gift. A Holocaust survivor who was carjacked awaits news on her granddaughter and restores some of Greene's faith, while Jeanie mediates when gang members want revenge after a beloved Catholic priest is shot to death.
36	11	"Dead of Winter"	Whitney Ransick	John Wells	January 4, 1996	457211	37.6
Carter gets the chance to control the treatment of an elderly patient without Benton's supervision. Benton gets invited to a formal dinner party by Dr. Vucelich. Greene receives the summons for his divorce. Twenty-two children locked up in an apartment are sent to County for medical treatment.
37	12	"True Lies"	Lesli Linka Glatter	Lance Gentile	January 25, 1996	457212	34.6
Carter's relief is short lived when his patient returns to the ER. Benton attends his boss' dinner party and takes Boulet as his date. Morgenstern is admitted to the ER for a fractured leg wearing a kilt. Greene spends the day with his daughter, Rachel, who is unhappy about his separation from his wife and hostile towards Lewis. Carol tells Ross to ease up on a father who was a drunk but is now sober and trying to be strong for his young son.
38	13	"It's Not Easy Being Greene"	Christopher Chulack	Paul Manning	February 1, 1996	457213	35.9
Greene works on a case where a patient dies for no apparent reason and then gets bad news regarding the O'Brien lawsuit. Carter takes credit for Harper's findings. Benton becomes suspicious of Dr. Vucelich's research.
39	14	"The Right Thing"	Richard Thorpe	Lydia Woodward	February 8, 1996	457214	38.1
Benton learns that doing the right thing is not always that easy. Rumors fly that Greene and Lewis are having an affair, while Lewis intervenes in a case involving a couple where both parties are drunk and one has AIDS. Ross has an unexpected encounter.
40	15	"Baby Shower"	Barnet Kellman	Story by : Belinda Casas Wells & Carol Flint; Teleplay by : Carol Flint	February 15, 1996	457215	36.4
The maternity ward experiences some sprinkler malfunctions and eight expectant mothers are brought to the ER. Ross and his father finally have a fun evening together, and Harper faces a pregnancy scare. Benton attempts to fix an apparently hopeless attempted suicide case.
41	16	"The Healers"	Mimi Leder	John Wells	February 22, 1996	457216	36.0
Hathaway worries when she learns her paramedic boyfriend, Shep, has run into a burning building to try to save the kids inside. However, it is Shep's partner, Raul, who suffers the worst injuries. Carter has difficulty treating third-degree burns. Chloe returns to Susan's dismay. Susan double tasks handling the baby and responding to the demands of the ER.
42	17	"The Match Game"	Thomas Schlamme	Neal Baer	March 28, 1996	457217	36.0
Lewis' sister Chloe says she wants baby Suzie back, but Susan's not interested in dealing with Chloe. Susan deals with an accident in which one of the people was drunk and gets a hard smack from the mother. Benton feels guilty about his own inability to do the right thing, so he betrays Ross when faced with an ethical dilemma, earning him the enmity of both Ross and Greene. Greene tries a cooler image and gets sympathy from an attractive TV producer. Carter celebrates his match to County in a way that might end his medical career before it begins.
43	18	"A Shift in the Night"	Lance Gentile	Joe Sachs	April 4, 1996	457218	33.2
It is Greene's fourth night on the graveyard shift and things are not looking too great when it is being overrun with patients. Tension continues between Greene and Benton, but the shift work brings greater respect between Greene and Carter.
44	19	"Fire in the Belly"	Félix Enríquez Alcalá	Paul Manning	April 25, 1996	457219	32.2
Hathaway notices a dramatic change in Shep's behavior. Weaver begins filming the procedures in the ER. Carter's sneaky moves to get more surgical work ruins his relationship with Harper. Lewis finds out she will not win her custody battle because Chloe seems to have cleaned up her act. Benton decides to officially charge Vucelich with fraud.
45	20	"Fevers of Unknown Origin"	Richard Thorpe	Carol Flint	May 2, 1996	457220	34.3
Lewis deals with losing custody of little Suzie by working an extra shift, impressing Weaver in the process. Greene comes to friendly terms with his ex-wife Jen as their divorce is finalized. Carter works with Ross in a pediatrics rotation.
46	21	"Take These Broken Wings"	Anthony Edwards	Lydia Woodward	May 9, 1996	457221	32.0
Boulet learns something disturbing about her ex-husband Al. Hathaway covers up for Shep's increasingly violent mood and gets him cleared of work charges, but recognizes he has gone over the edge. Weaver makes a deal with Greene in her quest in becoming an ER attending. Lewis has therapy sessions to mourn the loss of little Suzie.
47	22	"John Carter, M.D."	Christopher Chulack	John Wells	May 16, 1996	457222	34.3
After Kerry reluctantly agrees to a deal with Mark to name Susan the new Chief Resident in exchange for Kerry becoming a Senior Resident too, he's surprised when Susan turns down the position but understands her reasoning. Mark learns Jenn is getting re-married and Doug learns his lover Karen is a drug-using liar. Boulet runs into Al as he's preparing for his new life with HIV and tells a stunned Benton he must get tested as well. Hathaway quits in disgust over the way insurance companies ruin lives, and also tells Shep that Riley was right about his instability; when Shep refuses to get the help he needs, Carol ends their relationship. Carter misses his degree ceremony to care for a teen awaiting a life-saving transplant, and then decides to join Benton's team for his surgical residency.

== Reception ==
ER's second season proved to be popular and it became the number 1 show in the US. Nielsen Viewer ratings and viewers were also exceedingly high, especially for "Hell and High Water".

British magazine Empire found the best ER episode was the seventh titled "Hell And High Water" where Doug Ross (George Clooney) saves a young boy from drowning during a flood."

== DVD features ==
Region 1 DVDs have subtitles available in English, French and Spanish.

Audio commentaries are available for episodes 1 and 16, with Mimi Leder, editor Randy Jon Morgan, and Laura Innes).
