= ER season 3 =

ER
- Season 3
- DVD cover
- Starring: Anthony Edwards; George Clooney; Sherry Stringfield; Noah Wyle; Julianna Margulies; Gloria Reuben; Laura Innes; Eriq La Salle
- No. of episodes: 22

Release
- Original network: NBC
- Original release: September 26, 1996 – May 15, 1997

Season chronology
- ← Previous; Season 2 Next → Season 4

The third season of the American fictional drama television series ER first aired on NBC on September 26, 1996, and concluded on May 15, 1997. The third season consists of 22 episodes.

== Plot ==
Early in the season, Susan Lewis leaves for Phoenix to live with her sister and niece. Before she leaves, Greene realizes his feelings for her and races against time to declare them. He makes it to Union Station just as she is boarding the train. He stops her and declares his love, begging her to stay. Susan leaves anyway, but not before kissing Mark and declaring, as the train pulls out of the station, that she loves him too. In the aftermath of her departure, Mark begins to fall into depression, develops a meaner attitude, and starts sleeping with County General nurse Chuny Marquez, although they soon break up. Towards the end of the season, he is viciously attacked in the ER bathroom, and the thug is never caught. Although some suspicions arise over former patients and families, his beating was no more than a random act of violence. He becomes increasingly paranoid about his personal safety and distances himself from friends and family.

Meanwhile, Doug and Carol draw closer, culminating in a kiss at the end of the season. Doug is said to be attending therapy throughout the season, although this is never shown on-screen. This is possibly due to one of his one night stands dying in the hospital just after they were together, and Doug questioning his actions. Carol considers going to medical school, but eventually decides that she loves her work as a nurse too much to change.

Carter, now an intern, continues to lock horns with Benton, especially over Benton's treatment of surgical intern Dennis Gant. This eventually results in Gant throwing himself in front of a train. Despite the ER staff's best efforts, Gant eventually dies from his injuries, devastating Carter who begins blaming himself and Benton for not doing more to prevent Gant's suicide.

Benton also starts dating Carla Reece, who becomes pregnant and gives premature birth to his son at the end of the season. Weaver supports Jeanie, who is forced to reveal her HIV-status early in the season, when Mark gains unauthorized access to her medical records. While Jeanie struggles with her condition, she becomes involved with a doctor from the infectious diseases department, before reuniting with her ex-husband, Al.

== Production ==
Original executive producers John Wells and Michael Crichton reprised their roles. Lydia Woodward joined them as a third executive producer having previously served as a co-executive producer since the first season. Mimi Leder did not return as a co-executive producer having moved into directing feature films. Carol Flint returned as a co-executive producer. Christopher Chulack returned to his role as director and producer and was promoted mid-season to fill Leder's position as director and co-executive producer. Paul Manning returned to his supervising producer post. Long-term crew member Wendy Spence Rosato returned as a co-producer. Neal Baer and Lance Gentile were promoted from their second season positions as executive story editors to co-producers for the third season. Gentile continued to act as the series medical consultant. Penny Adams joined the series as a co-producer mid-season. Finally Michael Hissrich joined the production team in the junior role of associate producer.

Wells, Woodward, Flint, and Manning continued to regularly write episodes, with each contributing to 10 or more episodes this season. Baer and Gentile also continued to regularly write episodes contributing to eight and four episodes respectively. Joe Sachs returned as technical adviser and wrote a further episode. Regular writer Tracey Stern also returned and contributed a further two episodes. Second season writer Belinda Casas Wells also returned and wrote a further two episodes. They were joined on the writing staff by Samantha Howard Corbin and Jason Cahill with three episodes each. Anne Kenney contributed to the story for a single episode. Barbara Hall wrote the teleplay for a single episode.

Chulack continued to regularly direct episodes and helmed a further four episodes in the third season. Richard Thorpe, Félix Enríquez Alcalá, and Rod Holcomb were all returning directors for the third season. Thorpe continued to act as a cinematographer on some episodes in addition to directing. Jonathan Kaplan joined the directing team as a regular and contributed three episodes to the season. Tom Moore and Paris Barclay also made their series debuts and directed two episodes each. The other new single episode directors were David Nutter, series editor Jacque Elaine Toberen, Perry Lang, Davis Guggenheim, and Michael Katleman.

== Cast ==
=== Main cast ===
- Anthony Edwards as Dr. Mark Greene – Attending Emergency Physician
- George Clooney as Dr. Doug Ross – Pediatric Emergency Medicine Fellow
- Sherry Stringfield as Dr. Susan Lewis – Fourth-year ER Resident (episodes 1–8)
- Noah Wyle as Dr. John Carter – Surgical Intern (First-year Resident)
- Julianna Margulies as Nurse Carol Hathaway – ER RN and Nurse Manager
- Gloria Reuben as Jeanie Boulet – ER Physician Assistant
- Laura Innes as Dr. Kerry Weaver – Attending Emergency Physician
- Eriq La Salle as Dr. Peter Benton – Fourth-year Surgical Resident

=== Supporting cast ===
Doctors and medical students

- William H. Macy as Dr. David Morgenstern – Chief of Surgery and Emergency Medicine
- Sam Anderson as Dr. Jack Kayson – Chief of Cardiology
- Amy Aquino as Dr. Janet Coburn – Chief of Obstetrics and Gynecology
- John Aylward as Dr. Donald Anspaugh – Chief of Staff
- CCH Pounder as Dr. Angela Hicks – Surgical Attending Physician
- Glenne Headly as Dr. Abby Keaton – Pediatric Surgeon
- Maria Bello as Dr. Anna Del Amico – Pediatric Emergency Medicine Fellow
- Jorja Fox as Dr. Maggie Doyle – Intern
- Omar Epps as Dr. Dennis Gant – Surgical Intern
- Matthew Glave as Dr. Dale Edson – Surgical Intern
- Iqbal Theba as Dr. Zagerby – Ophthalmologist
- Harry Lennix as Dr. Greg Fischer – From Infectious Diseases department
- Perry Anzilotti as Dr. Ed – Anesthesiologist
- Don Perry as Dr. Sam Breedlove – Surgical Attending Physician
- Ted Rooney as Dr. Tabash – Neonatologist
- Jami Gertz as Dr. Nina Pomerantz – Psychiatrist
- Melissa Chan as Dr. Leung Joo Hua
- Dwier Brown as Dr. David Herlihy

Nurses

- Ellen Crawford as Nurse Lydia Wright
- Conni Marie Brazelton as Nurse Conni Oligario
- Deezer D as Nurse Malik McGrath
- Laura Cerón as Nurse Chuny Marquez
- Yvette Freeman as Nurse Haleh Adams
- Lily Mariye as Nurse Lily Jarvik
- Vanessa Marquez as Nurse Wendy Goldman
- Jenny O'Hara as Temp Nurse Rhonda Sterling
- Dinah Lenney as Nurse Shirley
- Bellina Logan as Nurse Kit
- Lucy Rodriguez as Nurse Bjerke
- Suzanne Carney as OR Nurse Janet

Staff, paramedics and officers

- Abraham Benrubi as Desk Clerk Jerry Markovic
- Kristin Minter as Desk Clerk Miranda "Randi" Fronczak
- Charles Noland as Desk Clerk E. Ray "E-Ray" Bozman
- Deborah May as Director of Nursing Mary Cain
- Erica Gimpel as Social Worker Adele Newman
- Skip Stellrecht as Chaplain Miller
- Mike Genovese as Officer Al Grabarsky
- Ron Eldard as Paramedic Ray "Shep" Shepard
- Emily Wagner as Paramedic Doris Pickman
- Montae Russell as Paramedic Dwight Zadro
- Lyn Alicia Henderson as Paramedic Pamela Olbes
- Brian Lester as Paramedic Brian Dumar
- J.P. Hubbell as Paramedic Lars Audia
- Meg Thalken as Chopper EMT Dee McManus

Family

- Christine Harnos as Jennifer "Jenn" Greene
- Yvonne Zima as Rachel Greene
- Michael Beach as Al Boulet
- Khandi Alexander as Jackie Robbins
- Ving Rhames as Walter Robbins
- Lisa Nicole Carson as Carla Reece
- Rose Gregorio as Helen Hathaway

=== Guest stars ===
- Lawrence Tierney as Jack Johnson
- John Diehl as Mr. Johnson's son
- William Sanderson as Mr. Percy
- Ewan McGregor as Duncan Stewart
- Currie Graham as James
- Joe Torry as Chris Law
- Jim O'Heir as Mr. McKenna
- Kirsten Dunst as Charlene "Charlie" Chiemingo
- Harry Shearer as John Symthe
- Julie Hagerty as Brenda Wilkerson
- Joe Lisi as Mr. Gunther
- Nan Martin as Mrs. Curwane
- Veronica Cartwright as Norma Houston
- Chad Lindberg as Jad Houston
- Clea DuVall as Katie Reed
- Tim Bagley as Archie Papion

== Episodes ==
No. overall	No. in season	Title	Directed by	Written by	Original release date	Prod. code	US viewers (millions)	Rating/share (18–49)
48	1	"Dr. Carter, I Presume"	Christopher Chulack	John Wells	September 26, 1996	465401	34.89	18.7/47
Carter starts his first day as a lowly surgical intern and finds himself more stressed than ever. Hathaway goes back to working in the ER. Peter finds out he is HIV negative but Jeanie Boulet's HIV results change her life forever.
49	2	"Let the Games Begin"	Tom Moore	Lydia Woodward	October 3, 1996	465402	30.49	16.6/42
The Southside hospital gets shut down and its employees merge with County General hospital, with everyone terrified by the arrival of new Chief of Staff Dr. Donald Anspaugh. Hathaway considers selling her house to deal with her financial problems, only to learn no one will ever consider buying it. Boulet keeps her HIV status a secret, to Peter's disapproval but Kerry's understated acceptance.
50	3	"Don't Ask, Don't Tell"	Perry Lang	Story by : Paul Manning & Jason Cahill; Teleplay by : Jason Cahill	October 10, 1996	465403	29.99	16.3/43
Benton starts to work as a pediatric surgeon. Mark is sad when Susan goes on vacation without him, and also when he's stuck dealing with an elderly, comatose patient that won't die and the patient's very simple-minded son. Carter befriends fellow intern Dennis Gant and finds himself on Benton's bad side after lying to the OR team about a surgery.
51	4	"Last Call"	Rod Holcomb	Story by : Samantha Howard Corbin & Carol Flint; Teleplay by : Samantha Howard Corbin	October 17, 1996	465404	32.93	17.7/44
Benton does not have the compassion needed for being a pediatric surgeon, while Carter does. Jeanie gets attention from a handsome patient who makes her cold reality of being HIV+ feel worse. Doug's one-night stand has a seizure that ends up killing her, and while Doug was not responsible for her death, he views himself the same way his co-workers do: as a worthless and broken man.
52	5	"Ghosts"	Richard Thorpe	Neal Baer	October 31, 1996	465405	31.13	16.7/46
Lewis comes back from vacation. Hathaway and Ross take their turn in the mobile health van. Gant learns that Benton is harder on him than he is with Carter. A devoted husband's deep and unashamed love for his dying wife leads Jeanie to finally tell Al what a rotten man he is---including that his philandering "killed me" with HIV.
53	6	"Fear of Flying"	Christopher Chulack	Lance Gentile	November 7, 1996	465406	36.68	19.2/49
Lewis and Greene rush to a car accident in a helicopter. Benton makes a mistake during surgery that puts a baby's life in jeopardy. Carol is displeased when a floor nurse gets floated into the ER and doesn't do a great job.
54	7	"No Brain, No Gain"	David Nutter	Paul Manning	November 14, 1996	465407	37.41	20.1/50
Lewis makes an announcement about her future that shocks Mark. Benton feels guilty about his involvement resulting in a baby's critical condition and tries to save another brain dead child. Carter feels guilty when a scared patient's surgery has an unhappy result, but finds a surprising romantic connection. Mark is being hypercritical of Doug until Doug calls him on it and the two men seem to be setting their friendship right again. Carol lands hard on the floor nurse when a gruesome error is committed, but learns the nurse's claims that she was set up to lose part of her pension are valid. Benton discovers unexpected relief while Mark still can't bring himself to say how he really feels about Lewis.
55	8	"Union Station"	Tom Moore	Carol Flint	November 21, 1996	465408	37.03	19.3/49
Time and Cupid wait for no man. A wedding in the waiting room contrasts with Greene's inability to express his feelings to Lewis, even though it is her last day in the ER. Elsewhere, nurse Lydia finally gets her cop boyfriend to marry her, while Doug and runaway Charlie try to help a baby whose mother has vanished. NOTE: Dr. Susan Lewis leaves the show for five years
56	9	"Ask Me No Questions, I'll Tell You No Lies"	Paris Barclay	Story by : Neal Baer & Lydia Woodward; Teleplay by : Barbara Hall	December 12, 1996	465409	32.89	17.8/47
Jeanie's confidential medical files are not confidential when Greene checks them and confirms his suspicions that she has HIV, enraging Kerry. Keaton levels with Carter about their relationship, which Carter amusingly hides from Peter. Doug lends support to Mark as his friend deals with depression.
57	10	"Homeless for the Holidays"	Davis Guggenheim	Samantha Howard Corbin	December 19, 1996	465410	34.27	18.1/46
Kerry and Mark initially can't agree on a workable ER policy regarding HIV+ Jeanie Boulet, but Jeanie's input leads to both a solid plan and some understanding between her and Mark. Jeanie later tells the ER staff she has HIV and is touched that the response from them is supportive. Maggie Doyle helps an abused wife escape her monstrous partner. Carter enjoys time with Abbie Keaton and avoids an increasingly mopey Gant. Carol observes Ukrainian Christmas with family and two unexpected guests.
58	11	"Night Shift"	Jonathan Kaplan	Paul Manning	January 16, 1997	465411	35.85	19.1/46
A night that begins slowly soon ignites: Greene risks his career to save a life. Benton discovers Carter's secret. Charlie suffers a beating, and the ER suffers the shocking loss of one of its own. NOTE: Final appearance of Dr. Gant.
59	12	"Post-Mortem"	Jacque Elaine Toberen	Carol Flint	January 23, 1997	465412	35.09	18.7/47
Gant's death weighs heavily on Carter, and his anger grows over how Benton treated the intern. Carol copes with a makeshift RN staff during a labor sickout and takes the blame for a fatal trauma room error. Jeanie meets a handsome infectious disease expert and they like each other until he bumbles his reaction to learning she is HIV+.
60	13	"Fortune's Fools"	Michael Katleman	Jason Cahill	January 30, 1997	465413	33.64	17.8/46
A good day for Greene: he and Marquez end their romance amicably, and his mentoring of prospective interns earns praise. A lousy day for Hathaway: she gets suspended when she defies both labor and management over last week's tragedy. Elsewhere, Carter gets fed up with Benton's withdrawal from actually doing surgical work; Maggie Doyle isn't sure how to handle a case involving a revered veteran cop who might have neurological issues; and Jeanie's assumptions and distrust of a doctor lead her to make a very bad disclosure.
61	14	"Whose Appy Now?"	Félix Enríquez Alcalá	Neal Baer	February 6, 1997	465414	33.29	18.0/46
Carter is the delighted surgeon when Benton needs an appendectomy. Ross is caught between a teen with Cystic Fibrosis who wants to be DNR and the young man's mother who wants all measures taken. Greene finds that the only thing worse than juggling two girlfriends is trying to juggle three.
62	15	"The Long Way Around"	Christopher Chulack	Lydia Woodward	February 13, 1997	465415	35.87	18.9/47
Caught in a convenience store when a robbery turns into a shooting and then a hostage situation, Carol does what she can for the old man owner of the store who is seriously wounded.: Guest starring Ewan McGregor as one of the robbers, Currie Graham as the other.
63	16	"Faith"	Jonathan Kaplan	John Wells	February 20, 1997	465416	33.20	17.6/46
Benton is recovering from his surgery, but not from the death of Gant. Greene places a Down's syndrome patient on a heart transplant list. Ross' CF patient from Whose Appy Now?, who has just turned 18, asks that Ross be the one to take him off his respirator. Carter treats a woman with a serious condition but he seems to be the only one who sees it. Carol takes the MCAT, with encouragement from Ross.
64	17	"Tribes"	Richard Thorpe	Lance Gentile	April 10, 1997	465417	34.38	18.6/47
Race relations become an issue in the ER when Greene treats two injured teenagers, one black and the other white, and assumes the black kid is a drug dealer. It turns out the white kid is a drug dealer and the black kid is innocent. When the black student's older brother confronts Greene, he begins to question his own impartiality. Carol helps a young woman who was drugged with Rohipnol and raped. Benton gets an interesting offer from Hicks. He also learns that Carla Reece has been admitted to the hospital. Greene's daughter ends up spending the day in the ER when her mom has to rush to Florida to deal with a family emergency.
65	18	"You Bet Your Life"	Christopher Chulack	Paul Manning	April 17, 1997	465418	32.09	16.9/44
Carter puts his career in jeopardy when he circumvents channels to arrange surgery for a patient Dr. Anspaugh has written off as too high-risk. Jeanie reconsiders her plight and how she views ex-husband Al when she cares for an AIDS patient loathed by her unforgiving husband. Carol's inferiority about being a nurse instead of a doctor causes her to clash with the younger Maggie. Greene learns that Rachel is having problems at school, and must balance his time between Rachel and improving his chance to attain tenure by publishing interesting ER cases.
66	19	"Calling Dr. Hathaway"	Paris Barclay	Story by : Neal Baer; Teleplay by : Jason Cahill & Samantha Howard Corbin	April 24, 1997	465419	33.58	17.9/44
A mouse in the house – and perhaps a new doctor-in-training, too. A genetically engineered lab mouse escapes into the ER. Hathaway weighs her career options after she scores high on the MCAT. Drs. Carter and Edson have a serious difference over a matter of ethics. Dr. Greene forgets he was to talk to Rachel's Brownie troop.
67	20	"Random Acts"	Jonathan Kaplan	Carol Flint	May 1, 1997	465420	31.54	17.0/40
A brother donates a kidney to his sister, a stroke patient receives cutting-edge treatment, and Jeanie's ex is accepted into a new AIDS-drug study. The ER staff is amused when they find and pass around the manuscript of a "sleazy, tongue-in-cheek romance" which thinly parodies the doctors and nurses. Greene is confronted by the brother of the young hoops star who died ("Tribes"). Later Greene is severely beaten in the men's room; the attacker is never clearly seen. He is found by Doug and is treated by his colleagues. NOTE: First appearance of Dr. Anna Del Amico
68	21	"Make a Wish"	Richard Thorpe	Story by : Joe Sachs; Teleplay by : Lydia Woodward	May 8, 1997	465421	34.82	18.8/45
It is Hathaway's birthday, but she does not want to hear about it. Doug annoys her by organizing a surprise party for her. Carla goes into early labor. Carter's patient-centric approach clashes with Anspaugh's fixation on surgery methods used to treat patients. Greene returns to the ER, but settling in proves difficult. Maggie offers Mark pepper spray; Carter accidentally sprays himself with it and is treated by Carol. Benton agonises over his ailing, prematurely newborn son. The police clear all known patients and family members of patients in Dr. Greene's beating; concluding he was the victim of a random act of violence.
69	22	"One More for the Road"	Christopher Chulack	John Wells	May 15, 1997	465422	34.94	N/A
Ross is increasingly drawn to Hathaway, Charlie reappears at the ER, Greene refuses to admit that he needs help, and Carter and Anspaugh are still at loggerheads. Meanwhile, the Boulets find strength in their renewed relationship, and Benton draws strength from his tiny newborn son.
