= ER season 4 =

ER
- Season 4
- DVD cover
- Starring: Anthony Edwards; George Clooney; Noah Wyle; Julianna Margulies; Gloria Reuben; Laura Innes; Maria Bello; Alex Kingston; Eriq La Salle
- No. of episodes: 22

Release
- Original network: NBC
- Original release: September 25, 1997 – May 14, 1998

Season chronology
- ← Previous; Season 3 Next → Season 5

The fourth season of the American fictional drama television series ER first aired on NBC on September 25, 1997, and concluded on May 14, 1998. The fourth season consists of 22 episodes.

== Plot ==
Season four opens with the live episode "Ambush", performed twice (once for the East coast, once for the West coast). Dr. Morgenstern, head of the ER, has a heart attack, threatening his life. Weaver agrees to temporarily step in until he recovers. Unfortunately, when Morgenstern does come back, he cannot perform surgery as he used to because he now knows what it is like to be a patient. After a surgical accident takes a man's life, Morgenstern decides to permanently step down as head of the ER and he leaves the hospital. Some new characters are introduced.

Two new physicians join the ER: Dr. Anna Del Amico, played by Maria Bello and a new British surgeon Dr. Elizabeth Corday, played by Alex Kingston. Corday came to America under the fellowship of Dr. Robert "Rocket" Romano (played by Paul McCrane), but their relationship sours towards the end of the season. After she rejects Romano when he asks her out, he decides not to renew her fellowship. She is forced to choose whether she moves back to England or stays in America as an intern.

Meanwhile, as Greene copes with his beating, he and Ross travel to California to bury Ross' dad. While there, Greene visits his own parents, where he finds out that his mother is sick, and his relationship with his dad continues to be strained. Back in Chicago, he begins to date new ER desk clerk Cynthia Hooper (played by Mariska Hargitay). The relationship is purely physical, and when Greene has to visit his parents again later in the season, she comes along uninvited, only to realize that Greene does not love her. After the awkward breakup, Cynthia leaves, but Greene stays to take care of his ailing mother and begin to mend his relationship with his father.

Ross and Hathaway get more serious when Ross surprises Hathaway and proposes to her in front of the ER staff, which she accepts. She later has commitment issues when she kisses a vulnerable paramedic. She tells Ross, and he reacts angrily. After a short time, Ross forgives her and tells her he will wait until she is ready to marry. In addition, Hathaway is able to open a free clinic in the ER with the financial help of Carter's grandmother. Ross vies for a pediatric attending position in the ER.

A lonely Corday starts a relationship with Benton, which causes friction with Benton's family because she is white.

Weaver attends a Synergix seminar to see how to better manage the ER. She begins to date a Synergix representative, Ellis West, who advises her to fire a physician's assistant, which happens to be Jeanie Boulet. Jeanie fights for her job, claiming that she was fired because of her HIV status. Facing a lawsuit, Chief of Staff Donald Anspaugh decides to hire her back. Weaver begins to see Synergix's dark side, and breaks up with West because she feels he is using her, effectively cutting off all ties with Synergix. During all of this, Jeanie's ex-husband, Al, is forced to reveal his HIV status. This gets him fired and forces him to look for a job in Atlanta, and he asks Jeanie to join him. Jeanie refuses, and Al leaves her. Later in the season, Jeanie cares for Anspaugh's cancer stricken son, because she is the only person able to get through to him. After he dies, Anspaugh feels much gratitude and remorse towards Jeanie, given her prior termination.

Carter pretends to be of humble origins in order to impress Anna, which fails when she finds out he actually comes from a wealthy family. Despite this, the two still become good friends, and she helps Carter help his cousin Chase detoxify from a heroin addiction. She had experience in the subject, considering her ex-boyfriend went through a similar experience. Unfortunately, their efforts were in vain, because Chase started using again and developed permanent brain damage from an overdose. At the end of the season, Anna's ex-boyfriend comes to the hospital to see if the ER is in need of a pediatrics attending. Anna is still in love with him, and faces a decision about her future in the ER. While Mark is away, a large explosion sends multiple patients to the ER. Weaver briefly has a seizure after being exposed to the toxic fumes. Mark returns and has fully recovered from his beating.

== Production ==
Original executive producers John Wells and Michael Crichton reprised their roles. Lydia Woodward also returned as an executive producer and writer. Carol Flint became a fourth executive producer. Flint was replaced as co-executive producer by Christopher Chulack. Chulack was previously a regular director and a producer for the third season. Paul Manning left his supervising producer role but remained involved with the series as an executive consultant. Long-time crew members Lance Gentile and Neal Baer were promoted to producers for the fourth season. Third season co-producers Wendy Spence Rosato and Penny Adams returned to their positions. Jack Orman and David Mills joined them as new co-producers and writers. Mills left the show midway through the season. Following his departure Adams was promoted to producer and Richard Thorpe and Michael Salamunovich joined the production team as co-producers. Thorpe had previously worked on the series as both a cinematographer and director. Salamunovich was the series unit production manager for the first three seasons and continued to fulfill this role as a co-producer. Michael Hissrich continued to serve as an associate producer. Manning, Hissrich, and Gentile all left the crew with the close of the season.

The series executive producers took a back seat to new writers in the fourth season. Wells' writing role was limited to just two episodes. Woodward wrote a single episode. Manning wrote a further episode. Flint wrote two episodes. Baer wrote two episodes while Gentile wrote a single episode and continued to serve as the series medical consultant. New co-producer Jack Orman contributed to four episodes as a writer. Mills wrote two episodes before leaving the series. New writer Walon Green wrote three episodes. Third season regular writer Samantha Howard Corbin became a story editor and wrote three more episodes. She was promoted to executive story editor mid-season. New writer Linda Gase wrote two episodes. Joe Sachs returned as technical adviser and wrote a further episode.

Chulack continued to serve as the series' most prominent director and helmed a further four episodes. Thorpe directed three more episodes. Charles Haid returned to the series for the first time since the first season to helm two episodes. New director Darnell Martin was the season's only other repeat director with two episodes. Other directors making their series debut with the fourth season were executive producer John Wells, Christopher Misiano, T.R. Subramaniam, and Sarah Pia Anderson. Regular directors returning to the series for single episodes include Jonathan Kaplan, Félix Enríquez Alcalá, Lesli Linka Glatter, and Thomas Schlamme. Cast member Anthony Edwards moved behind the camera to direct a further episode of the series. Editor Jacque Toberen and producer Lance Gentile each directed a single episode of the fourth season.

== Cast ==
=== Main cast ===
- Anthony Edwards as Dr. Mark Greene – Attending Emergency Physician
- George Clooney as Dr. Doug Ross – Pediatric Emergency Medicine Fellow
- Noah Wyle as Dr. John Carter – Emergency Medicine Intern
- Julianna Margulies as Carol Hathaway – RN and Nurse Manager
- Gloria Reuben as Jeanie Boulet – Physician Assistant
- Laura Innes as Dr. Kerry Weaver – Attending Emergency Physician
- Maria Bello as Dr. Anna Del Amico – Pediatric Emergency Medicine Intern
- Alex Kingston as Dr. Elizabeth Corday – Trauma/SCC Fellow
- Eriq La Salle as Dr. Peter Benton – Fifth-year Surgical Resident, Surgery Chief Resident

=== Supporting cast ===
Doctors and medical students

- William H. Macy as Dr. David Morgenstern – Chief of Surgery and Chief of Emergency Medicine
- Sam Anderson as Dr. Jack Kayson – Chief of Cardiology
- John Aylward as Dr. Donald Anspaugh – Chief of Staff
- CCH Pounder as Dr. Angela Hicks – Surgical Attending Physician
- Paul McCrane as Dr. Robert Romano – Surgical Attending Physician
- Jorja Fox as Dr. Maggie Doyle – Second-year ER Resident
- David Brisbin as Dr. Alexander Babcock – Anesthesiologist
- Clancy Brown as Dr. Ellis West – Associate ER Attending Physician
- Michael Buchman Silver as Dr. Paul Meyers – Psychiatrist
- Matthew Glave as Dr. Dale Edson – Second-year Surgical Resident
- Chad Lowe as George Henry – Medical Student
- Don Perry as Dr. Sam Breedlove – Surgeon
- Megan Cole as Dr. Alice Upton – Pathologist
- Ted Rooney as Dr. Tabash – Neonatologist
- Perry Anzilotti as Dr. Ed – Anesthesiologist
- Kenneth Alan Williams as Dr. Thomas Gabriel
- Alice Amter as Dr. Miriam Nagarvala
- Kenneth Tigar as Dr. Keinholz
- Kathleen Lloyd as Dr. Mack
- Dennis Boutsikaris as Dr. David Kotlowitz
- Justin Henry as James Sasser – Medical Student
- Joel de la Fuente as Ivan Fu – Medical Student

Nurses

- Ellen Crawford as Nurse Lydia Wright
- Conni Marie Brazelton as Nurse Conni Oligario
- Deezer D as Nurse Malik McGrath
- Laura Cerón as Nurse Chuny Marquez
- Yvette Freeman as Nurse Haleh Adams
- Lily Mariye as Nurse Lily Jarvik
- Gedde Watanabe as Nurse Yosh Takata
- Dinah Lenney as Nurse Shirley
- Kyle Richards as Nurse Dori Kerns
- Bellina Logan as Nurse Kit
- Suzanne Carney as OR Nurse Janet
- Tricia Dong as Nurse Joyce

Staff, paramedics and officers

- Abraham Benrubi as Desk Clerk Jerry Markovic
- Mariska Hargitay as Desk Clerk Cynthia Hooper
- Kristin Minter as Desk Clerk Miranda "Randi" Fronczak
- Erica Gimpel as Social Worker Adele Newman
- Christine Healy as Hospital Administrator Harriet Spooner
- George Eads as Paramedic Greg Powell
- Emily Wagner as Paramedic Doris Pickman
- Montae Russell as Paramedic Dwight Zadro
- Lyn Alicia Henderson as Paramedic Pamela Olbes
- Brian Lester as Paramedic Brian Dumar
- J.P. Hubbell as Paramedic Lars Audia
- Claudine Claudio as Paramedic Silva
- Ed Lauter as Fire Captain Dannaker
- Mike Genovese as Officer Al Grabarsky

Family

- Christine Harnos as Jennifer "Jenn" Greene
- Yvonne Zima as Rachel Greene
- Bonnie Bartlett as Ruth Greene
- John Cullum as David Greene
- Jonathan Scarfe as Chase Carter
- Frances Sternhagen as Millicent Carter
- George Plimpton as Grandpa Carter
- Michael Beach as Al Boulet
- Khandi Alexander as Jackie Robbins
- Taraji P. Henson as Patrice Robbins
- Mark Dakota Robinson as Steven Robbins
- Lisa Nicole Carson as Carla Reece
- Victor Williams as Roger McGrath
- Rose Gregorio as Helen Hathaway
- Trevor Morgan as Scott Anspaugh

=== Notable guest stars ===
- John Hawkes as P. A. (Episode 1)
- Nick Offerman as Roger (Episode 1)
- Joe Torry as Chris Law
- Michael Ironside as Dr. William "Wild Willy" Swift
- Carrie Snodgress as Mrs. Lang
- James LeGros as Dr. Max Rocher
- Dan Hedaya as Herb Spivak
- Harold Perrineau as Mr. Price
- Mickey Rooney as Dr. George Bikel
- Eva Mendes as Donna
- Michael Rapaport as Paul Canterna (Episode 20)
- David Denman as Angel (Episode 4)
- Kevin Weisman as Glenn Karkowski
- Brad William Henke as John

== Episodes ==
No. overall	No. in season	Title	Directed by	Written by	Original release date	Prod. code	US viewers (millions)
70	1	"Ambush"	Thomas Schlamme	Carol Flint	September 25, 1997	466356	42.71
A PBS camera crew invades the ER to film a documentary. A new British surgeon, Elizabeth Corday, uses unfamiliar medical terms. Morgenstern suffers a heart attack. NOTE 1: First appearance of Dr. Elizabeth Corday NOTE 2: There are two versions of this live episode (an "east coast" version and a "west coast" version). Only the "west coast" version appears in the Season 4 DVD set; the "east coast" version was bundled free with Season 4 DVD sets sold by Target.
71	2	"Something New"	Christopher Chulack	Lydia Woodward	October 2, 1997	466351	32.57
Still suffering emotionally from his beating, Greene misdiagnoses his cases. Benton and Carla finally name their son, who is recovering from his premature birth. Hathaway and Ross continue their secret affair. Carter deals with the loss of his seniority due to his move from surgery to the ER.
72	3	"Friendly Fire"	Félix Enríquez Alcalá	Walon Green	October 9, 1997	466352	32.13
Jeanie's ex-husband Al is forced to reveal his HIV-positive status after a workplace accident. Weaver must begin making budget cuts after being named the temporary replacement for Morgenstern. Carter is jealous over Maggie Doyle's rapport with Del Amico. Benton's son is circumcised against Benton's wishes. Greene resumes dating, but the effects of his trauma linger. An attractive female desk clerk with no previous experience is hired by Greene. Jerry is advised to take a long sabbatical after accidentally firing a weapon in the ER.
73	4	"When the Bough Breaks"	Richard Thorpe	Jack Orman	October 16, 1997	466353	32.79
Mark's continuing PTSD hurt his life both on and off the job: Jenn tells him she won't let Rachel stay with him until he gets help, and Carol is mad at him when he refuses to back her up against claims from a pregnant drug addict that Carol killed her baby. Carol is cleared but is then even angrier that the hospital repeatedly failed to give the junkie competent care that could have saved her child. Carter and Del Amico work with new med students, and Anna's student is terrific while Carter's is a disinterested zero. Both Jeanie and Al have job difficulties due to their HIV-positive status. Weaver tells Ross to find a research grant in order to keep his ER fellowship. The staff unites to treat survivors of a bus crash, and Carter and Benton are at odds over Carter leaving Surgery for Emergency Medicine, until Benton lets Carter know why he's pissed at him and Carter listens.
74	5	"Good Touch, Bad Touch"	Jonathan Kaplan	David Mills	October 30, 1997	466354	29.24
Hathaway comes up with the idea of a pediatric clinic for the ER, and starts looking for funding. A difficult case involving a young athlete brings a new understanding between Ross and Del Amico. Greene's anger issues flare up when he is deposed in a malpractice suit. Carter succeeds with a difficult diagnosis, affirming his decision to move from surgery to the ER. Benton is having trouble juggling work and parenthood. Jeanie watches Al and his former best friend get in a violent brawl. Benton meets Dr. Corday's sponsor, Dr. Robert "Rocket" Romano. NOTE: First appearance of Dr. Robert Romano
75	6	"Ground Zero"	Darnell Martin	Samantha Howard Corbin	November 6, 1997	466355	31.95
Benton's rivalry with Corday prompts him to join Romano's team. Greene, who continues to believe in the face of evidence that the brother of the athlete who died ("Tribes") is the person who beat him, confides in Cynthia, the new desk clerk, as his life continues to go downhill. After conferring with Synergix, a firm that helps streamline hospital operating costs, Weaver fires Jeanie for financial reasons. Hathaway meets with Carter's rich grandmother, Millicent "Gamma" Carter, about funding her clinic. Carter's efforts to conceal his wealth to get closer to Del Amico backfire. Ross learns that his father has died.
76	7	"Fathers and Sons"	Christopher Chulack	John Wells	November 13, 1997	466357	34.65
Greene and Ross travel to California to claim Ross' deceased father's belongings. Along the way the two visit the home of Greene's parents, and later receive a surprise visitor.
77	8	"Freak Show"	Darnell Martin	Neal Baer	November 20, 1997	466358	33.43
Maggie Doyle helps Jeanie get assistance to get her job back. Romano, Benton, and Corday operate on a unique case involving a boy with reversed organs. Hathaway's clinic is forced to open early when Cynthia sends the advertisement for it too soon. One of Carter's incompetent former students returns to redo his clerkship, and ends up being a patient. Greene meets a lawyer who can end his legal troubles in exchange for spending a day observing the ER.
78	9	"Obstruction of Justice"	Richard Thorpe	Lance Gentile	December 11, 1997	466359	31.66
Synergix starts setting up shop at County General. Defending a patient he suspects is abused, Carter is arrested for refusing to cooperate with a cop. While Weaver agrees to give Jeanie her job back, Al, her ex-husband whom she's living with, leaves for Atlanta to start over without Jeanie. Cynthia rubs Greene's ex-wife the wrong way concerning Rachel. Greene's lawyer tours the ER and ends up saving a life himself. Corday operates to save the leg of a young woman named Alison Beaumont, and the patient goes into a coma, causing Corday to question her own ambitions.
79	10	"Do You See What I See?"	Sarah Pia Anderson	Story by : Linda Gase; Teleplay by : Jack Orman	December 18, 1997	466360	32.45
On Christmas Eve, Benton and Del Amico develop a weird following after he apparently causes a blind man to see with his touch. Greene deals with an elderly rape survivor. Corday continues her soul searching regarding Alison's coma, but Romano helps her. Greene finds out that Cynthia has a child of her own, and finally puts his trauma in the past. Weaver develops a camaraderie with the Synergix representative, Dr. Ellis West. Gramma Carter tours the clinic with Hathaway and Jeanie, and grants extra funding. Carter discovers that his cousin, Chase, has a heroin problem. Ross and Hathaway reveal their romance to the ER.
80	11	"Think Warm Thoughts"	Charles Haid	David Mills	January 8, 1998	466361	32.23
On a particularly cold night, the ER is swamped with freezing homeless people. Weaver pushes hard for Synergix to take over ER management. Jeanie works with Anspaugh's son, Scott, who fears his cancer has returned. Corday earns Romano's ire while continuing to work with Alison, who now has a problem with her voice. Benton and Carter make a presentation to med students. Ross and Hathaway consider marriage but Carol's mom is not happy to learn her daughter is dating Doug again.
81	12	"Sharp Relief"	Christopher Chulack	Samantha Howard Corbin	January 15, 1998	466362	34.41
Weaver questions Synergix's management practices as Ellis' budget cuts tend to shut down trauma centers. Another elderly rape survivor is found by Hathaway during a paramedic ride-along, prompting an alert for a serial rapist. Tension grows between Benton, Corday, and Romano. Jeanie lifts Scott's spirits as he faces a new battle against cancer. Carter and Del Amico work together to deal with Chase's withdrawal from heroin. Benton and Corday go on a date to play darts. Hathaway and a vulnerable paramedic relate their experiences regarding suicide (the medic's mother hanged herself), and kiss. Hathaway confesses to Ross, who storms out.
82	13	"Carter's Choice"	John Wells	John Wells	January 29, 1998	466363	32.84
The serial rapist is finally caught but needs treatment. A mentally challenged woman gives birth. Benton's son may be placed in day care, and he comes to terms with it with Corday's help. Ross and Hathaway, and Greene and Cynthia have relationship problems. Carter's actions in treating the serial rapist cause tension between himself and Del Amico.
83	14	"Family Practice"	Charles Haid	Carol Flint	February 5, 1998	466364	31.89
Greene returns to San Diego to help when his mother is injured, prompting Cynthia to follow him. When his father gets ill as well, Greene finds himself assisting in a military hospital ER after a helicopter crash. Greene and Cynthia are forced to re-evaluate their fading relationship, while Greene and his father become closer.
84	15	"Exodus"	Christopher Chulack	Walon Green & Joe Sachs	February 26, 1998	466365	32.82
Greene is still in San Diego. Corday works to save a man trapped deep inside a collapsed building at a chemical plant. Carter is on an Optometry rotation. A chemical spill at the plant sends the ER into chaos; Weaver collapses from the fumes and Carter has to take charge. As the ER is evacuated, Ross and Hathaway take risks to save a sick girl and get stuck in an elevator when a fire alarm shuts them down.: Mickey Rooney has a cameo role.; Eva Mendes first appearance playing a babysitter who brings the little girl she's caring for into County General with an E. coli infection.
85	16	"My Brother's Keeper"	Jaque Toberen	Jack Orman	March 5, 1998	466366	30.36
Weaver accuses Ross of presenting a flawed research study. Greene searches for Cynthia. Carter's drug addict cousin Chase overdoses. Corday receives her first performance review from Romano and becomes closer to Benton. Scott and Jeanie continue their friendship.
86	17	"A Bloody Mess"	Richard Thorpe	Linda Gase	April 9, 1998	466367	30.91
Benton, Corday, and Reese are involved in a car accident. Scott's cancer worsens, bringing him back to Jeanie's care. Morgenstern returns, but is having difficulties on the job after his heart attack. Chase is left with severe brain damage after his overdose, and Carter watches over him. Hathaway works on animal rights activists after a protest gone awry. Benton surprises Corday by showing up at her apartment.
87	18	"Gut Reaction"	T.R. Babu Subramaniam	Neal Baer	April 16, 1998	466368	30.33
Benton and Morgenstern clash after a surgery is botched. Scott, with Jeanie's help, makes a choice about his cancer treatment. Carter helps Del Amico when she is found to be a potential bone marrow donor for a patient. Ross protects an ill child. Greene, with Jerry's help, organizes the ramshackle but fun annual ER banquet. Gamma Carter may cut funding to Hathaway's clinic, forcing Carter to make a difficult decision.
88	19	"Shades of Gray"	Lance Gentile	Samantha Howard Corbin	April 23, 1998	466369	32.44
Benton is forced to take the blame for the botched surgery until Morgenstern makes a shocking revelation. Alison Beaumont is back after being injured in a fire. Carter deals with life without his family's financial support. Jeanie helps Anspaugh through a difficult day. Ross counsels a family about their injured, pregnant daughter's treatment and their shunning of her boyfriend.
89	20	"Of Past Regret and Future Fear"	Anthony Edwards	Jack Orman	April 30, 1998	466370	30.21
Romano makes an offer that Corday refuses. Reese Benton is baptised. Ross deals with a baby addicted to methadone. Carter and Del Amico have trouble communicating with a patient severely disabled by cerebral palsy. Hathaway cares for a man who is going to die from chemical burns and comes to a decision about herself and Ross. Dr. Edward Hurvitz (University of Michigan) provided medical advice and expertise regarding cerebral palsy.
90	21	"Suffer the Little Children"	Christopher Misiano	Walon Green	May 7, 1998	466371	33.80
Del Amico's old boyfriend conducts a study at the hospital. A televangelist uses the ER to obtain money. Ross and Hathaway risk their jobs to do an unorthodox treatment on a methadone-addicted baby. Jeanie turns to Weaver for help with some personal problems.
91	22	"A Hole in the Heart"	Lesli Linka Glatter	Lydia Woodward	May 14, 1998	466372	47.78
As Josh, the methadone-addicted baby, recovers from an ultra-rapid detox, Ross' personal and professional relationships suffer. Hathaway has suspicions about a patient that attempted suicide. Corday's problems with Romano become critical. Carter's jealousy over Del Amico and her ex-boyfriend reaches a breaking point. Something is wrong with Benton's son. NOTE: Final appearance of Dr. Anna Del Amico
