= Motherhood (ER) =

- ER episode
- Carol and Susan take a break to sunbathe on the roof of the hospital, in a scene Decider found reminiscent of Reservoir Dogs.
- Episode no.: Season 1 Episode 24
- Directed by: Quentin Tarantino
- Written by: Lydia Woodward
- Cinematography by: Richard Thorpe
- Editing by: Jim Gross
- Production code: 456623
- Original air date: May 11, 1995
- Running time: 47 minutes

Guest appearances
- Patrick Collins as Dr. Netzley; Elizabeth Norment as Mrs. Sandburg; Marion Yue as Dr. Sandra Li; Abraham Benrubi as Jerry Markovic; Julie Carmen as Mrs. Lafferty; Conni Marie Brazelton as Nurse Connie Oligario; Yvette Freeman as Haleh Adams; Khandi Alexander as Jackie Robbins; Christine Harnos as Jennifer Greene; Andrea Parker as Linda Farrell; Valerie Perrine as Cookie Lewis; CCH Pounder as Angela Hicks; Gloria Reuben as Jeanie Boulet; Beah Richards as Mae Benton; Kathleen Wilhoite as Chloe; Lisa Zane as Diane Leeds; Kathy Griffin as Boy Scout's leader

Episode chronology
← Previous "Love Among the Ruins"	Next → "Everything Old Is New Again"
- ER season 1

"Motherhood" is the twenty-fourth and penultimate episode of the first season of the American medical drama ER. Written by supervising producer Lydia Woodward and directed by Quentin Tarantino, the episode was first broadcast on NBC on May 11, 1995.

In the Mother's Day-themed episode, Susan Lewis helps her sister Chloe give birth, John Carter learns the true outcome of his surgical internship application, and Peter Benton is told tragic news about his mother. Writing the episode, Woodward said she did not create the script with Tarantino in mind, but that she did try to "gross out" the screenplay after learning he would direct.

In its initial airing, "Motherhood" received the highest rating of the week, in front of episodes from Friends and Seinfeld, and was watched in a total of 21.8 million homes by 33.1 million viewers. The episode also received generally positive reviews from critics, who enjoyed the episode but also said that for ER, the directing style of Tarantino did not stand out.

== Synopsis ==
Late at night, pregnant Chloe (Kathleen Wilhoite) tells her sister Susan Lewis (Sherry Stringfield) that she is experiencing frequent contractions. At the hospital, Chloe gives birth and sings "Blackbird" to her newly born daughter, who she names "Little Susan" after her sister. On Mother's Day, Susan learns from her mother Cookie Lewis (Valerie Perrine) that she will have to help Chloe take care of her daughter. Meanwhile, John Carter (Noah Wyle) learns that he has not been accepted to the surgical internship he applied for, and Peter Benton (Eriq La Salle) learns that his mother has died. Additionally, Doug Ross (George Clooney) takes a long time to decide whether he wants to move in with his girlfriend Diane Leeds (Lisa Zane), who later rejects him after seeing him with his former girlfriend Linda. At night, Benton expresses his grief over his mother's death and Susan sings "Blackbird" to help her baby niece fall asleep.

== Production ==
"Motherhood" was directed by Quentin Tarantino and written by ER supervising producer Lydia Woodward. Tarantino decided to come on board as director after George Clooney (the actor who was portraying Doug Ross on ER) gave him the idea after being cast in From Dusk till Dawn (1996). Writing the episode, Woodward said that she did not create the script with Tarantino in mind, but did try to "gross out" the scenes featured in the episode after learning he would direct.

For his work on the episode, Tarantino received $30,000 from NBC. Filming it, Tarantino said he "liked the ER style" and the use of Steadicams to shoot long takes. On set, the director encountered a problem with executive producer John Wells, who told him to go back and reshoot a scene. Tarantino said that the incident taught him that in television, the choices were actually made by the producers as it was "their show. I'm directing the episode, and then I'm leaving". Julianna Margulies mentioned that Tarantino would only shoot one take for the scenes so the network would be forced to accept his cut of the episode without any interference.

== Reception ==
=== Viewership ===
According to the ratings system developed by Nielsen Media Research, "Motherhood" was the highest-rated television episode of the week from May 8 to May 14, 1995, in front of episodes from Friends ("The One with the Birth") and Seinfeld ("The Face Painter") that aired the same week. With a household rating of 22.9 and an audience share of 37, the NBC episode was watched by 33.1 million viewers in a total of 21.8 million homes.

=== Critical response ===
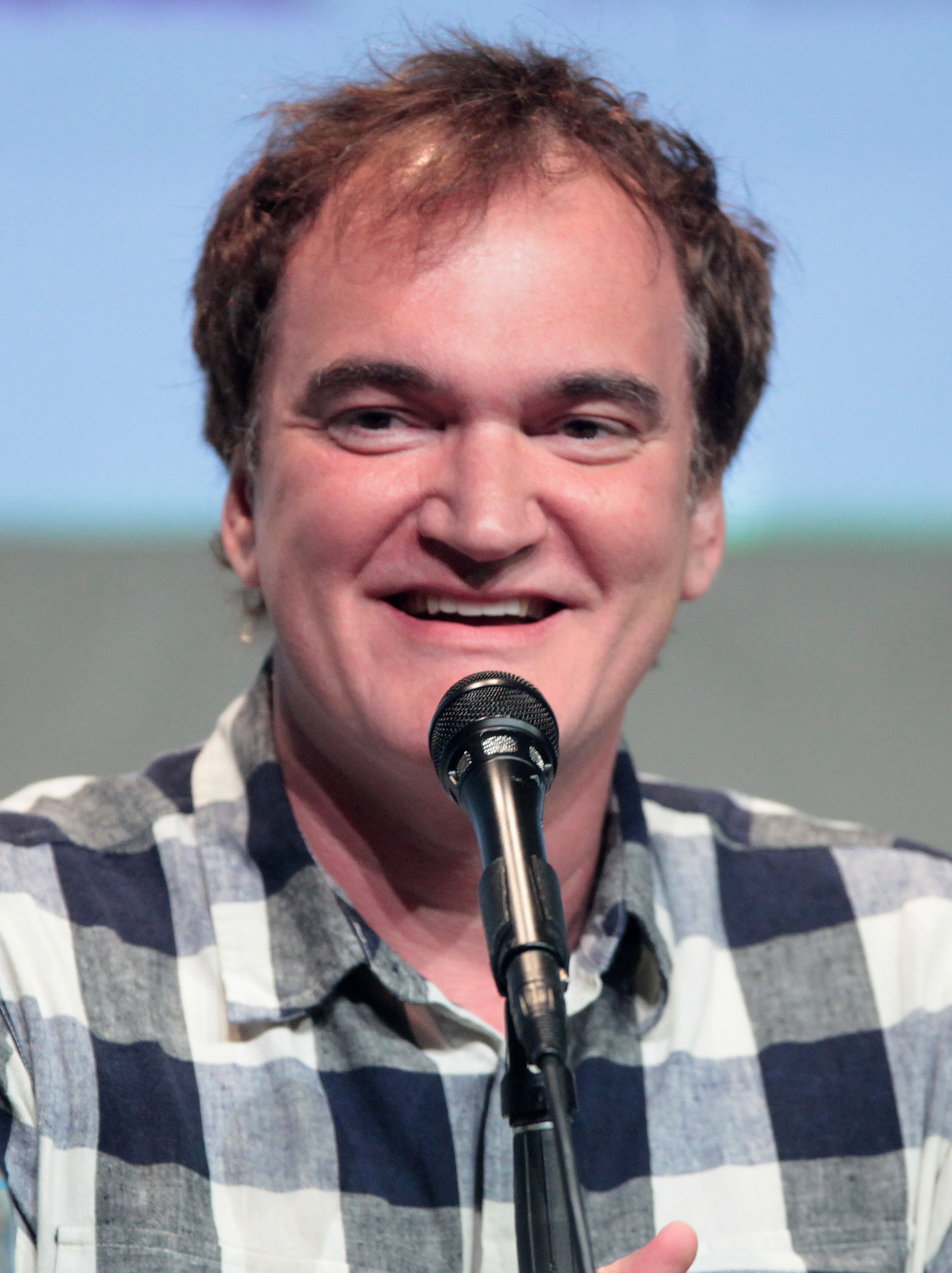
Various critics said the directing style of Quentin Tarantino did not stand out to them in the episode.

The ER episode received generally positive reviews from critics, who gave generally positive notes to director Quentin Tarantino. In a review from the Detroit Free Press, a critic said that the episode was "high-powered, fast-paced, [and] darkly funny", and said that the episode contained "sudden moments of intense, emotion-grabbing sentiment." Writing for The Boston Globe, Frederic M. Biddle said that NBC's choice of hiring a film director like Tarantino was risky, but ultimately said that the "gift of mischief dazzles."

Additionally, television critic Hal Boedeker simply called the episode "memorable", and said that it revealed "unexpected tenderness" from the director. In a positive note, David Zurawik from The Baltimore Sun compared Tarantino's dark humor to the jokes found in M*A*S*H and St. Elsewhere, while Richard Helm, writing for the Edmonton Journal, said that he felt Tarantino was "[fighting] the temptation" of applying his "reputation on shock violence and dark humor" to the episode. On a mixed review from The News-Press, Kinney Littlefield said that Tarantino's directing style on the episode was "edgy" but that for ER, it did not stand out.

From the South Florida Sun Sentinel, Tom Jicha wrote that overall, the episode was not worse than others from the season. Writing for The Indianapolis Star, Steve Hall gave the episode two and a half stars out of five, and said Tarantino's unique style of directing was "almost undetectable". In his weekday column on the Lansing State Journal, Mike Hughes said the episode was not special compared to others on ER, writing that "Tarantino is smart enough to avoid overwhelming the show. He adds his few touches, but mainly lets ER be itself." In 2019, Gold Derby ranked it as the 20th best episode in the series.
