= Hell and High Water (ER) =

- ER episode
- Episode no.: Season 2 Episode 7
- Directed by: Christopher Chulack
- Written by: Neal Baer
- Editing by: Jacque Toberen
- Production code: 457207
- Original air date: November 9, 1995

Guest appearances
- Abraham Benrubi as Jerry Markovic; Robert Cicchini as News Reporter; Erik von Detten as Ben Larkin; Luis Ávalos as Pediatrician; Christine Elise as Harper Tracy; Andrea Parker as Linda Farrell; William H. Macy as Dr. Morgenstern; Ellen Albertini Dow as Mrs. Riblet; Cynthia Mace as Doctor; Chase Masterson as Mrs. Phillips; J. Madison Wright as Molly Phillips; Peter Gregory as Mr. Phillips; Conni Marie Brazelton as Nurse Connie Oligario; Deezer D as Nurse Malik McGrath; Lily Mariye as Nurse Lily Jarvik; Vanessa Marquez as Nurse Wendy Goldman; Zachary Charles as Joey Larkin; Yolanda Gaskins as TV News Reporter; Will Jeffries as Mr. Larkin; Nika Kolodziej as Amber; Kurt Naebigas as Paramedic; Richard Pickren as Jimmy; Monté Russell as Dwight Zadro; Warner Saunders as News Anchor; Stephanie Sawyer as Mindy; Raymond D. Turner as Security Guard

Episode chronology
← Previous "Days Like This"	Next → "The Secret Sharer"
- ER season 2

"Hell and High Water" is the seventh episode of the second season of the medical drama series ER. The 32nd episode overall, it first aired on NBC in the United States on November 9, 1995. It was written by Neal Baer and directed by Christopher Chulack. The episode attracted 42 million viewers on its initial broadcast, making it the highest-rated show of the week, is regarded as one of ER's best episodes, and is credited for catapulting George Clooney to national stardom.

== Plot ==
Doug Ross (George Clooney) attends an interview for a new job at a private pediatric practice after he is told his contract at County General will not be renewed. The head of the practice (Luis Ávalos) offers him the job, and Ross accepts. Back at the ER, a 10-year-old victim of a hit-and-run, Molly Phillips (J. Madison Wright) is brought in with severe injuries. She is examined by Peter Benton (Eriq La Salle) and his interns John Carter (Noah Wyle) and Harper Tracy (Christine Elise). The medical staff stabilizes Molly, and new physician assistant Jeanie Boulet (Gloria Reuben) impresses ER chief David Morgenstern (William H. Macy) by identifying Molly's injuries from X-rays.

Ross returns to the ER for his final shift, greeted by Mark Greene (Anthony Edwards) and Carol Hathaway (Julianna Margulies), but seems strangely annoyed considering his successful interview. Tracy and Carter extubate Molly. Jerry (Abraham Benrubi) struggles with a new computer and thinks he may have accidentally deleted radiology data. Linda Farrell (Andrea Parker) arrives, reminding Ross that he is meant to accompany her to an opera performance that evening. Farrell also manages to fix the computer, which Carol then uses to play Doom II. Benton orders Jeanie to write a summary of all the discharge notes for a patient that has been admitted many times over the past few years.

Molly's parents (Peter Gregory and Chase Masterson) arrive, and it is revealed that they are separated. Mr. Phillips blames Mrs. Phillips for Molly's injuries, and the two begin to argue. Tracy asks them for a photograph of their daughter to help the plastic surgeon repair Molly's cheek laceration, and this defuses the altercation. As Ross drives in heavy rain to pick up Linda, he gets a flat tire. A young boy, Joey Larkin (Zachary Charles), runs up to Ross' car, screaming that his brother needs help. Ross gets out of the car and hurriedly follows him.

Joey leads Ross to a storm drain where his brother, Ben (Erik von Detten) is trapped, with his leg caught in a gate inside. Ross attempts to free Ben's leg, but realizes it causes too much pain for Ben. He sends Joey to find a payphone and call for help. Ross notices there is a grate in the top of the tunnel that may allow him to get to Ben from the other side of the drain. He investigates, but the grate is locked and stuck shut. He returns to Ben to continue trying to free his leg but is not successful, and bonds with Ben by asking him questions about baseball, and promising that, when they get through this situation, he will take Ben to a game at Wrigley Field.

Ross goes back to his car to fetch tools to help, telling Ben to keep singing while he is gone in an attempt to stop the youth from losing consciousness in the cold water. Joey finds Ross and tells him he could not find a phone, so Ross smashes a shop window and tells Joey to use a phone there to call an ambulance. Returning to Ben, Ross attempts to use a jack to widen the gap between the bars to free the leg more easily. Ben begins to lose consciousness and goes under the water, causing Ross to try and break the hinges of the gate with a crowbar. The gate suddenly breaks, and the huge water pressure sends both Ross and Ben flying back into the pool at the end of the drain tunnel. Ross desperately searches under the water and eventually finds Ben. He carries him to dry land and begins to perform CPR.

Meanwhile, Greene has also become engrossed in Doom II. Jeanie tells Benton she has finished with the discharge notes and believes the patient has a hernia. Mrs. Phillips wants her own plastic surgeon to work on Molly, rather than the one at the hospital, prompting Mr. Phillips to disagree with her.

Ross is still trying to perform CPR on Ben when Joey returns with a guard. Ross uses a pen to perform a tracheotomy on Ben before carrying the boy back to the road. An ambulance arrives, as well as a television news helicopter, which picked up the call for paramedics. A reporter (Robert Cicchini) in the helicopter begins filming Ross for live broadcast on NBC 5. Ross demands that Ben be taken to County General, despite the paramedics' reluctance due to Mercy Hospital being much closer. The news helicopter agrees to transport Ross and Ben to County instead.

With Ross still being broadcast live on the news, he continues his attempts to revive Ben on board the helicopter. The defibrillator, which was borrowed from the paramedic team, is not charged up and this causes a delay. When Ross uses the helicopter's radio to contact County General, the staff realize that Ross is on the TV. Greene tells other staff members to prepare for Ross' arrival as Ross forces the reporter to turn off the camera and help him.

Molly complains to Carter and Benton of stomach pain, and Benton orders a CT scan. Greene and Carol meet the helicopter on the roof of the hospital, and use a defibrillator on Ben. They take him inside the hospital to a trauma room to keep trying to revive him. At the same time, in the other trauma room, Molly has crashed during her CT. Ben is hypothermic and placed on a heart bypass machine while his body is warmed up. Molly is suffering from internal bleeding in her abdomen due to a blood clot rupturing an artery. However, the doctors are unable to revive her and she is declared dead. Tracy is distraught as she had become close with Molly and had never before witnessed a patient death.

Later on, Ben finally wakes up to Doug sitting by his side. He is taken to another ward in the hospital for further recovery. Greene stitches up a cut on Doug's arm, and the two reconcile their differences. As they leave the hospital, they are both swamped by a crowd of news reporters blocking their way shouting questions at Ross and declaring him to be a hero.

== Reception ==
=== Ratings ===
In its original American broadcast, "Hell and High Water" was watched by 42 million viewers. It had a 45% market share, which was the highest for a regularly scheduled drama since an episode of Dallas earned 46% in 1985, and a 27.8 rating, the best for a drama since 1987. It became the best rated ER episode and received the highest rating for an NBC drama since Nielsen began tracking them. "Hell and High Water" remains the 2nd most-watched ER episode (after the season 4 finale).

=== Critical response ===
Mike Duffy of the Detroit Free Press gave the episode three out of four stars and called it "one powerful hour of roller coaster television." Duffy said "Hell and High Water" does not "quite match the brilliance" of critically acclaimed first-season episode "Love's Labor Lost", but the "intense and affecting hour of ER at least gives George Clooney a prime showcase for proving he's not just another pretty face." Phil Kloer from The Atlanta Constitution gave the episode three and a half stars out of four. He thought that unlike "Love's Labor Lost", which flowed naturally, "Hell and High Water" "feels like a more blatantly manipulative ratings sweeps stunt." He believed viewers would feel "drained" by the end of the intense episode, but Clooney shows that he has a "future to burn on TV's hottest hit."

Howard Rosenberg of Los Angeles Times praised Clooney, Baer, and Chulack for making the episode "a suspenseful, transfixing blow away—and one that forged an uneasy, fleeting alliance between emergency medicine and local TV news, their clashing agendas in this case belied by a shared reliance on speed." Rosenberg continued his praise, saying "No subtleties here, no nuances or shadings. Everything on the surface. Yet it was television at its mightiest and most thrilling, and reason enough to rejoin the ER bandwagon."

The Indianapolis Star critic Steve Hall also rated the episode three and a half stars out of four. He wrote that as last week's episode saw Dr Ross at his worst, the writers used "Hell and High Water" to "brilliantly show the dedication and medical heroism that more than make up for Ross's faults". Similarly to Duffy and Kloer, Hall did not think the episode was on the same emotional level as "Love's Labor Lost", and concluded that "an unrealistic solution to an emergency lessens our emotional investment. But the episode is gripping, intense television." John Martin for the Courier News gave the action an "A-plus" and found the secondary storyline of Molly's accident "gives the hour added emotional punch." The Jackson Sun's critic Mike Hughes branded the episode "one of NBC's most stunning moments."

Steven H. Scheuer chose the episode as part of The Town Talk's "Best Bets" feature. The episode's focus on Dr Ross led Scheuer to quip "Welcome to the George Clooney hour." He believed the actor was guaranteed another Emmy nomination "on the strength of this instalment alone." In The Times-Tribune, syndicated reporter Kirk Nicewonger also thought Clooney would garner an Emmy nomination after giving "what may well be the dramatic performance of the season". In further praise of the actor, Nicewonger stated that Clooney "gives a tour-de-force performance of phenomenal emotional range." He urged viewers not to miss the "incredibly intense" episode, writing "For 60 minutes, the tension never lets up, and the ending—a catharsis juxtaposing life and death— packs enough power of heart to light up Chicago."

Screen Rant's Bernardo Sim named "Hell and High Water" as the best episode of Season 2. He felt that it "really solidified" Clooney's importance in the show, and "definitively showcased the types of stories that ER could tell, many of which did not have to take place inside a hospital." In 2018, British magazine Empire named "Hell and High Water" as the best ER episode. When ER was made available to stream on Hulu, Randee Dawn of USA Today, chose "Hell and High Water" as one of eight episodes that would "get your heart racing".

=== Accolades ===
"Hell and High Water" garnered various awards and nominations following its broadcast. At the 48th Directors Guild of America Awards, Chulack won Outstanding Directing in a Drama Series. The episode earned six nominations at the 48th Primetime Emmy Awards held in September 1996. Clooney received a nomination for Outstanding Lead Actor in a Drama Series, while Baer was nominated for Outstanding Individual Achievement in Writing for a Drama Series and Chulack for Outstanding Individual Achievement in Directing for a Drama Series. At the Primetime Creative Arts Emmy Awards, Richard Thorpe's work on the episode earned him an Outstanding Individual Achievement in Cinematography for a Series nomination. Jacque Elaine Toberen was nominated for Outstanding Individual Achievement in Editing for a Series - Single Camera Production, and Allen L. Stone, Frank Jones, Michael Jiron, and Will Yarbrough were nominated for Outstanding Individual Achievement in Sound Mixing for a Drama Series.
