= Lance Gentile =

American screenwriter

Lance Gentile is an American doctor, television technical advisor, writer, and producer.

== Career ==
Gentile graduated with a BA degree in psychology from Cornell University in Ithaca, New York. He was a medical student at New York Medical College and completed his residency in the emergency department at Maine Medical Center in Portland. He later moved to Los Angeles, and practiced emergency medicine at several community hospitals, including the San Dimas Community Hospital and the Santa Monica Hospital Medical Center. In 1986, Gentile entered the MFA program at USC Film School. He wrote and directed STAT, an autobiographical film about his life in a hospital emergency department. The film received many awards, including the Cine Colden Eagle and Nissan Focus Awards for best documentary. He graduated in 1990 and went on to direct music videos and documentaries before working in television.

Gentile began working in television as a technical advisor because of his experience as a medical professional. He wrote, co-produced and served as the technical advisor for a television movie called State of Emergency. Gentile was nominated for a Humanitas Prize in 1994 for his work on State of Emergency. This led to technical advisor positions on another television movie named Donor and on Wes Craven's film New Nightmare.

Gentile was technical advisor for the pilot episode of ER and had a cameo in the episode. He became technical advisor for the first season of and wrote several episodes. He was made medical consultant before the end of the season. Gentile's episode "Love's Labor Lost" won him an Emmy Award for Outstanding Writing for a Drama Series at the 1995 ceremony. Gentile also won a Writers Guild of America Award for his work on the episode.

Gentile became a story editor for the second season of ER and continued to write episodes and serve as medical consultant. He was promoted to executive story editor mid-season. Gentile made his television directing debut with a second-season episode of ER. Gentile became a co-producer on the third season and retained his writing and medical consultant responsibilities. The third season of ER was nominated for an Emmy Award for Outstanding Drama Series at the 1997 awards. The producers shared the nomination for their work on the season. Gentile was promoted to producer for the fourth season and continued to write and direct episodes and serve as the season's medical consultant. The season was again nominated for the Emmy Award for Outstanding Drama Series at the 1998 awards and Gentile shared the nomination for a second time.

Gentile left the crew of ER following the fourth season and became a supervising producer and writer on the first season of Providence. Gentile also worked as a consulting producer and writer for the first and second seasons of Third Watch. He was a producer for the short-lived medical drama Dr. Vegas and wrote two episodes for that series.

Gentile served as a medical technical advisor for the pilot of House M.D. and has recently completed writing and executive producing a television movie entitled Austin Golden Hour.

== Filmography ==
=== Writer ===
Year	Show	Episode	Notes
1994	State of Emergency	N/A	Television movie
1994	ER	"Another Perfect Day"	Story - season 1, episode 7
1994	ER	"Blizzard"	Season 1, episode 10
1995	ER	"Love's Labor Lost"	Season 1, episode 19
1996	ER	"True Lies"	Season 2, episode 12
1996	ER	"Fear of Flying"	Season 3, episode 6
1997	ER	"Tribes"	Season 3, episode 17
1997	ER	"Obstruction of Justice"	Season 4, episode 9
1999	Providence	"Sisters"	Season 1, episode 4
1999	Providence	"Taste of Providence"	Season 1, episode 9
1999	Third Watch	"Impulse"	Season 1, episode 7
2000	Third Watch	"Men"	Season 1, episode 18
2000	Third Watch	"Jimmy's Mountain"	Season 2, episode 4
2000	Third Watch	"History"	Season 2, episode 10
2004	Dr. Vegas	"Limits"	Season 1, episode 5
2005	Dr. Vegas	"Babe in the Woods"	Season 1, episode 9
2008	Austin Golden Hour	N/A	Television movie

=== Technical advisor ===
Year	Production	Season	Notes
1990	Donor	Television movie	Technical advisor
1994	State of Emergency	Television movie	Technical advisor
1994	New Nightmare	Film	Medical technical advisor
1994	ER	Season 1	Technical advisor
1995	ER	Season 1	Medical Consultant
1995	ER	Season 2	Medical Consultant
1996	ER	Season 2	Medical Consultant
1996	ER	Season 3	Medical Consultant
1997	ER	Season 3	Medical Consultant
1997	ER	Season 4	Medical Consultant
1998	ER	Season 4	Medical Consultant
2003	Something's Gotta Give	Film	Technical Advisor
2004	House M.D.	Season 1, episode 1	Medical technical advisor

=== Director ===
Year	Show	Episode	Notes
1996	ER	"A Shift in the Night"	season 2, episode 18
1998	ER	"Shades of Gray"	season 4, episode 19
