= Ambush (ER) =

- ER episode
- Episode no.: Season 4 Episode 1
- Directed by: Thomas Schlamme
- Written by: Carol Flint
- Cinematography by: Richard Thorpe
- Editing by: Jim Gross
- Production code: 466356
- Original air date: September 25, 1997
- Running time: 47 minutes

Guest appearances
- Nick Offerman as Roger; John Hawkes as P.A.

Episode chronology
← Previous "One More for the Road"	Next → "Something New"
- ER season 4

"Ambush" is the premiere episode of the fourth season of the American medical drama ER. The 70th episode overall, it was written by executive producer Carol Flint and directed by Thomas Schlamme and it was first broadcast on NBC on September 25, 1997, as a live episode, filmed twice for the East and West Coast. The episode was also pre-filmed in the event a technical issue happened.

Shown through the perspective of a PBS documentary film crew, the emergency room is filmed as a day in the life of the doctors. The episode introduced British actress Alex Kingston as Elizabeth Corday to the cast. Inspiration for the episode came from production staffers having worked in documentaries, with Anthony Edwards and George Clooney suggesting to do it live.

In its initial airing, "Ambush" received the highest rating of the week. Seen by a total of 42.71 million viewers, it became the most-watched season premiere episode for a drama series. Reception to the episode was mixed from critics. Praise was given to the live performances but the story and script writing were criticized for being lackluster. "Ambush" received four nominations at the 50th Primetime Emmy Awards, winning one.

== Synopsis ==
The County General Hospital is filmed by a PBS documentary film crew, capturing the staff treating patients, ranging from a dog bite attack to a good Samaritan being thrown off a bridge for stopping a gang initiation. During filming, chief of surgery and head of the ER David Morgenstern (William H. Macy) suffers a heart attack and gets hospitalized. Newly hired British surgeon Elizabeth Corday (Alex Kingston) joins the hospital, while John Carter (Noah Wyle) learns he has to repeat his internship after switching from surgical to emergency medicine. The production crew hits a raw nerve with Mark Greene (Anthony Edwards), and he refuses to being interviewed after inquiring on his assault from last season. After Carter loses an elderly patient, Greene berates him for trying to be a hero. Greene allows the documentary crew to interview him on the condition they do not use the footage of him and Carter.

== Production ==
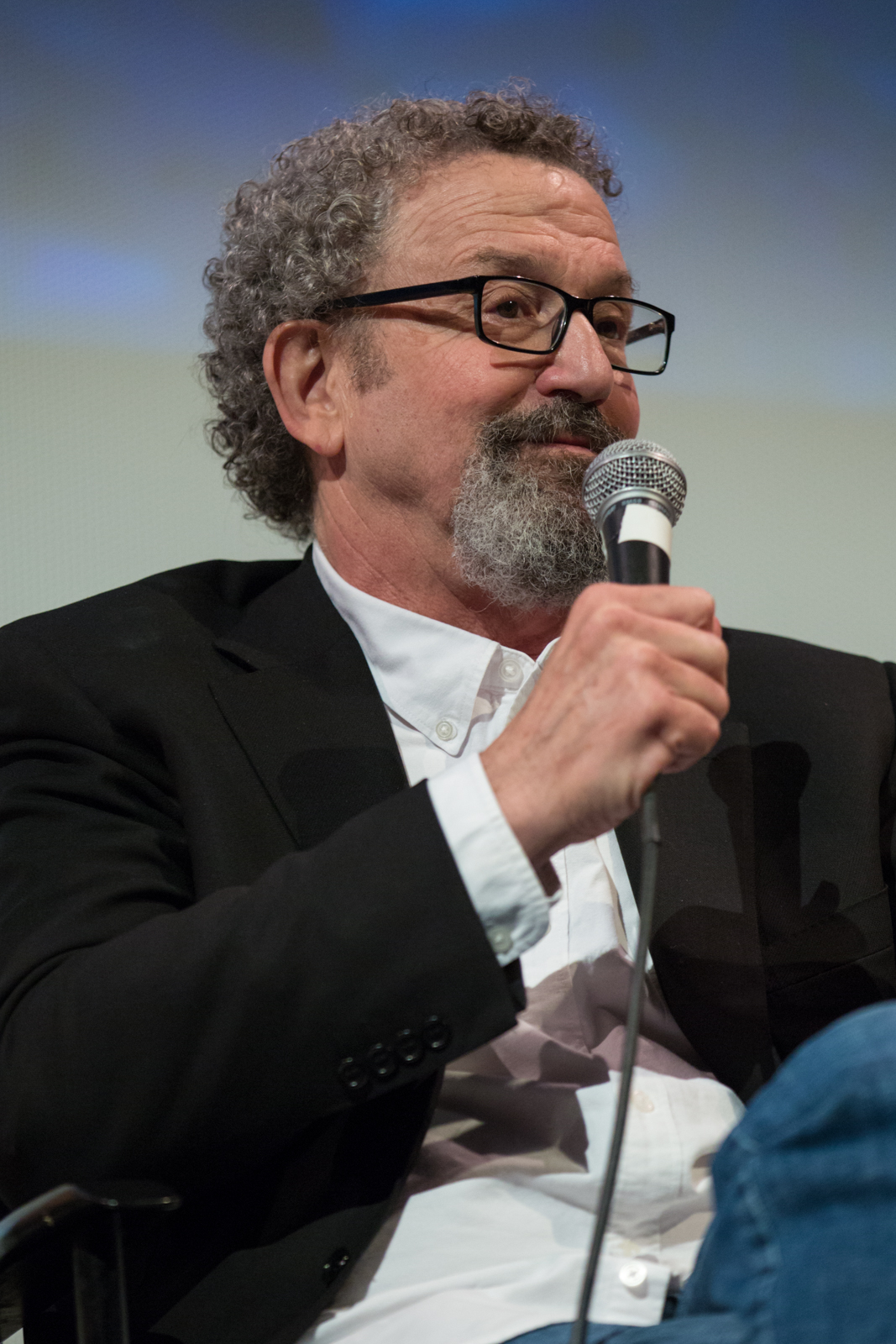
Thomas Schlamme (pictured in 2016) directed the episode.

"Ambush" was directed by Thomas Schlamme and written by executive producer Carol Flint. Inspiration for the episode came from production staffers for the show having worked in documentaries and actors Anthony Edwards and George Clooney suggesting that they should do a live episode. The episode was filmed live twice for the East and West Coast of the United States. British actress Alex Kingston made her series debut as Elizabeth Corday.

The episode was shot at Warner Bros. Studios, Burbank, using 11 cameras throughout, five handheld. Rehearsals for the episode began a week before, with executive producer John Wells having been quoted that the process was "more exciting than daunting". A pre-filmed version of the episode was made in the event a technical issue happened on set. Flint remarked that if the episode was a success, it could lead to the rebirth of live television.

Camera malfunctions and boom mics seen in the shot were said to be part of the episode. After its premiere, Eriq La Salle admitted to forgetting one of his lines and ad-libbed.

Later the same year, the recording of the performance that aired live on the west coast was aired on the east coast, and the tape of the live east coast performance was broadcast on the west coast. The Season 4 DVD set includes the west coast airing, though Target carried copies of the set that included a bonus disc with the east coast airing.

== Reception ==
=== Viewership ===
According to the ratings system developed by Nielsen Media Research, "Ambush" was the highest-rated television episode of the week from September 22 to September 28, 1997, in front of episodes from Seinfeld ("The Butter Shave") and the series premiere of Veronica's Closet that aired the same week. the NBC episode was watched by 42.71 million viewers, making it the most watched season premiere of a drama series in television history. It also placed it among the top three most-watched dramas of all time, behind Dallas ("Who Done It", November 21, 1980) and Magnum, P.I. ("Resolutions", May 1, 1988).

=== Critical response ===
The ER episode received mixed reviews from critics, praising the minimal gaffes during the episode. Variety's Ray Richmond, while finding the episode a bit contrived, considered it a "pretty impressive, oft-compelling" episode. Caryn James of The New York Times was critical of the writing, calling the script "hackneyed", and overall summarized the episode as "terminally dull". Steve Hall for The Indianapolis News, while finding a few moments to be "undeniably powerful", felt that the documentary crew plot device cheapened moments such as Dr. Morgenstern suffering a heart attack.

Howard Rosenberg for the Los Angeles Times was critical of the episode and its live format, calling it a cynical gimmick to attract viewers and "hardly the dramatic breakthrough and courageous theater that you would have thought from the gaseous hot air advertising it." Carol Flint and Thomas Schlamme would later write a rebuttal piece to Rosenberg's review, published in the October 6, 1997 issue of the LA Times.

A retrospective assessment by David Sims of The A.V. Club listed it as one of the best episodes of the series. While Sims did not believe the story was memorable, he called the technical work for the episode a "substantial milestone". In 2019, Gold Derby ranked it as the 12th best episode in the series.

At the 50th Primetime Emmy Awards, it won Outstanding Technical Direction, Camerawork, Video Control for a Series and was nominated for Outstanding Lighting Design / Lighting Direction for a Variety Special and Outstanding Sound Mixing for a Comedy or Drama Series (One-Hour). Thomas Schlamme received a nomination for Outstanding Directing for a Drama Series for his direction.
