= Love's Labor Lost (ER) =

- ER episode
- Episode no.: Season 1 Episode 19
- Directed by: Mimi Leder
- Written by: Lance Gentile
- Production code: 456618
- Original air date: March 9, 1995

Guest appearances
- Ellen Crawford as Lydia Wright; Yvette Freeman as Haleh Adams; Lily Mariye as Lily Jarvik; Theodore Borders as Joey Paige; Bradford Drazen as Dr. Ralph Drake; Edith Fellows as Sadie Hubbell; Jesse D. Goins as Mr. Paige; Maddi Lewis as Dr. Pauline Blair; Shelley Malil as Dr. Urami; Christopher Richardson as Jesse; Mark Dakota Robinson as Steven; Colleen Flynn as Jodi O'Brien; Bradley Whitford as Sean O'Brien; Monty Ash as Old Man w/Dentures; Jeffrey Dean Rosenthal as Tattoo Man

Episode chronology
← Previous "Sleepless in Chicago"	Next → "Full Moon, Saturday Night"
- ER season 1

"Love's Labor Lost" is the nineteenth episode of the first season of the American medical drama ER. It first aired on March 9, 1995, on NBC in the United States. The episode was written by Lance Gentile and directed by Mimi Leder. "Love's Labor Lost" earned five Emmy Awards (Writing, Directing, Editing, Sound Editing and Sound Mixing) and several other awards and nominations, and it is often regarded by fans as the best episode of the series.

== Plot ==
Dr. Mark Greene encounters the case of a pregnant woman suffering from what he initially thinks is a urinary tract infection, due to protein in the urine, but what is actually eclampsia. With the obstetrics attending unavailable, he decides to try to deliver her baby in the ER, first through vaginal delivery. Motionless, after a McRoberts maneuver fails, he's forced to perform a crash c-section with tragic results. Elsewhere, a teenager is accidentally poisoned by insecticides and Dr. Peter Benton has to deal with the aftermath of his mother's fall.

== Reception ==
In its original broadcast, "Love's Labor Lost" finished first in the ratings for the week of March 6–12, 1995, with a 24.2 Nielsen rating and 40 percent audience share. It was the highest rated show on NBC that week with episodes of Seinfeld and Friends second and third respectively. In 1997, TV Guide ranked it as the third in its list of the 100 Greatest Episodes of All Time. In 2009, it ranked the episode sixth. The show's producers also consider it to be one of ER's best episodes, with John Wells saying he holds it up as "an example to everyone involved creatively of what the best of the show could be." However, Wells also noted that the story maintained a traditional structure, and that the episode would not stand out if the rest of the episodes were like "Love's Labor Lost" and other "most talked-about" episodes.

Ray Richmond of Los Angeles Daily News praised the episode, calling it "one of the rare instances when network television stands tall as true art".

The episode earned writer Lance Gentile a Primetime Emmy Award for Outstanding Writing for a Drama Series at the 47th Primetime Emmy Awards, in addition to a Writers Guild of America Award for Television: Episodic Drama at the 49th Writers Guild of America Awards. The episode also earned Mimi Leder a Primetime Emmy Award for Outstanding Directing for a Drama Series at the 47th Primetime Emmy Awards as well as a nomination for Directors Guild of America Award for Outstanding Directing – Drama Series at the 48th Directors Guild of America Awards. Colleen Flynn earned a nomination for Primetime Emmy Award for Outstanding Guest Actress in a Drama Series for her performance in this episode, which was her only appearance in the TV series. The episode earned a number of other Emmys: Outstanding Individual Achievement in Editing for a Series – Single Camera Production for Randy Jon Morgan and Rick Tuber; Outstanding Individual Achievement in Sound Editing for a Series for Walter Newman (supervising sound editor), John Voss Bonds Jr. (sound effects editor), Rick Camera (sound effects editor), Steven M. Sax (sound effects editor), John F. Reynolds (dialogue editor), Catherine Flynn (dialogue editor), Thomas A. Harris (adr editor), Susan Mick (music editor), Casey J. Crabtree (Foley artist), and James Bailey (Foley artist); as well as Outstanding Individual Achievement in Sound Mixing for a Drama Series for Russell C. Fager (production sound mixer), Michael Jiron (sound effects mixer), Allen L. Stone (dialogue mixer) and Frank Jones (music mixer). The episode also won an American Cinema Editors Award for Best Edited One-Hour Series for Television for Randy Jon Morgan and Rick Tuber.
