= Tracey Stern =

American television writer and producer

Tracey Stern is an American television writer and producer.

Stern made her television debut writing for the first two seasons of ER. She has also worked as a writer on Pacific Blue, Sports Night, Angel, Law & Order: Special Victims Unit, Leap Years, Touching Evil, Desperate Housewives, The Book of Daniel, and Angela's Eyes. Stern has also worked as a producer for Sports Night, Angel, Desperate Housewives and Angela's Eyes. The first season of Desperate Housewives was nominated for an Emmy award for Outstanding Drama Series at the 2005 awards. The producers shared the nomination for their work on the season.
