= Paul Manning (TV producer) =

American television producer and writer

- Born: December 3, 1959 (age 66); Madison, Wisconsin, U.S.
- Died: January 2, 2005 (aged 45); Los Angeles, California, U.S.
- Occupations: Television producer, writer

Paul Manning (December 3, 1959, in Madison, Wisconsin – January 2, 2005, in Sherman Oaks, California (of colorectal cancer)) was an American television producer and writer.

== Career ==
Manning learned the basics of his craft at the American Film Institute in Los Angeles. Manning started as a writer on L.A. Law. He won an Primetime Emmy Award for Outstanding Drama Series in 1996 for his work on ER. Mentioned ("in memory of our good friend”, and on the next line, “paul manning", all lower case) before the ending credits of ER on 1/13/2005, Season 11, Episode 10
