= Mike Genovese =

American actor (born 1942)

- Born: Peter Michael Genovese; April 26, 1942 (age 84); St. Louis, Missouri, U.S.
- Occupation: Actor
- Years active: 1973–present
- Spouse: Ellen Crawford (m. 1982)

Peter Michael Genovese (born April 26, 1942) is an American actor.

== Career ==
Genovese was born and raised in St. Louis, Missouri to an Italian American family. Genovese earned a master's degree in drama at Eastern Illinois University and taught acting at Webster College from 1969 to 1973 before devoting himself to work as actor in Washington, D.C., where he met his future wife, TV/film actress Ellen Crawford, Chicago, and later Los Angeles.

A character actor known for playing heavies, Genovese has appeared in many films such as two Richard Pryor billed vehicles, Jo Jo Dancer, Your Life Is Calling (1986) and Harlem Nights, which also co-starred Eddie Murphy, Redd Foxx and Della Reese, and guest roles on TV series such as The Dukes of Hazzard, The Paper Chase, Star Trek: The Next Generation, Family Matters, NYPD Blue, Quantum Leap, Arli$$, ER, Chicago Hope, and JAG. In 1990 he was a cast member in the short lived series The Flash where he played Lt. Warren Garfield. For ER, the long-running medical drama which aired on NBC, Genovese appeared in a recurring role as Officer Al Grabarsky, where he appeared opposite his real life wife, Crawford, who was as cast regular as Nurse Lydia Wright, his character's girlfriend. He appeared in twelve episodes of the series from 1994 through 2000.

=== Theater roles ===
In 1979, Genovese had a performance as Philip Marlowe at Chicago's Organic Theater in a Stuart Gordon-directed adaptation of Raymond Chandler's The Little Sister. In 2005, he appeared as Rev. Tollhouse in The Book of Liz play by Amy Sedaris and David Sedaris at the 2nd Stage Theatre, Hollywood.
