= Ellen Crawford =

American actress

- Born: 1950 or 1951 (age 74–75); Dayton, Ohio, U.S.
- Other name: Ellen Genovese
- Occupation: Actress
- Years active: 1982–present
- Spouse: Mike Genovese (m. 1982)

Ellen Crawford (born 1950 or 1951) is an American actress. She is known for her role as Nurse Lydia Wright on ER from 1994 through 2003 and then again in 2009 for the series finale.

Crawford has also performed on stage, in A Touch of the Poet by Eugene O'Neill. Crawford also made a couple of guest appearances in 2010 in comedy-drama Desperate Housewives.

== Biography ==
Crawford was born in Dayton, Ohio, and lived in nearby Sidney before her family relocated to Normal, Illinois. She graduated from University High School in Normal in 1969. From 1969 to 1970, Crawford played Sheila for over 400 performances in the Chicago production of the musical Hair. She is a graduate of Carnegie Mellon University, and married actor Mike Genovese in 1982. On ER, Genovese portrayed officer Alfred Grabarsky, whom Nurse Wright wed during the show's third season.

Crawford previously performed on stage at the Utah Shakespeare Festival, in Cedar City, Utah, where she was Mrs Bennett in Pride and Prejudice and Miss Havisham in Great Expectations.

== Filmography ==
Year	Title	Role	Notes
1982	Romance Theatre	Liz	(5 episodes)
1983	Three's Company	Brenda McNair	("Grandma Jack")
1983	Newhart	Mrs. Putnam	("Animal Attractions")
1984	Hill Street Blues	Reporter	("Ewe and Me, Babe")
1984	Dynasty	Woman at Phone	("The Mortgage")
1984	Teachers	Social Worker	
1984	Murder, She Wrote	Muriel	("The Murder of Sherlock Holmes")
1984	At Your Service	Mrs. Anderson	TV movie
1984	Best Defense	Sonya, Dynatechnics	
1984	Riptide	Cynthia	("Double Your Pleasure")
1984	AfterMASH	Shelly Lucas	("Up and Down Payments")
1984	The Master	Cannery Worker	("State of the Union")
1985	Stitches	Miss Marshall	
1985	Otherworld	Head Supervisor	("Princess Metra")
1986	The Art of Being Nick	Depressed customer	TV movie
1986	Picnic	Olive	TV movie
1987	Werewolf	Marta	("Nightmare at the Braine Hotel")
1987	Night Court	Leona Cowen/Davide	("Safe")
1987	Who's That Girl		
1988	The Invisible Kid	Teacher	
1988	The Bronx Zoo	Mrs. Feeney	("Truancy Blues")
1988	Mr. Belvedere	Claire	("Heather's Monk")
1989	The War of the Roses	Nurse #1	
1989	Thirtysomething	Dr. Price	("Payment Due")
1990	The Giant of Thunder Mountain	Agnes Macgruder	
1990	Who's the Boss?	Professor Wallace	("Who's Minding the Kid?")
1990	China Beach	Julie Martin	("You, Babe")
1990	Faith	Beatrice	
1991	The Story Lady	Rita	TV movie
1991	Growing Pains	Dr. Whiteside	("Jason Sings the Blues")
1991	The Whereabouts of Jenny	Clerk	
1992	When No One Would Listen	Judge Beckerman	TV movie
1992	Ulterior Motives	Elizabeth	
1992	Tales from the Crypt	Dorothy Chalmers	("Seance")
1992	Baby Talk	Diane	("The Prince and the Pooper")
1994	Where Are My Children?		TV movie
1994	Untamed Love	Ellen	TV movie
1994	Moment of Truth: Cradle of Conspiracy	Lorna Gill	TV movie
1994	ER	Nurse Lydia Wright	(113 episodes) 1994 - 2003, 2009
1996	Diagnosis Murder	Mrs. Underwood	("X Marks the Murder: Part 1" and "Part 2")
1996	Sister Island	Esther Lynch	
1997	The Tony Danza Show	Eugenia Cooper	("Pilot")
1998	Twice Upon a Time	Peg Sager	TV movie
1998	Soldier	Ilona	
1999	Entropy	Molly Gustke	short
2000	7th Heaven	Mrs. Pierce	2000 - 01 ("Surprise!" and "One Hundred")
2000	CSI: Crime Scene Investigation	Lt. Jane Gribbs	scenes deleted ("Cool Change")
2001	Escaping Jersey	Lucy	
2001	Free	Barbara Jenkins	
2001	Last Writes		short
2001	Harvey's Speech	Anita	
2001	The Division	Mrs. Wyle	("Hide and Seek")
2003	Remember	Cheryl	short
2005	Boston Legal	Frances Stadler	("The Black Widow" and "Schadenfreude")
2006	Without a Trace	Clinic Receptionist	("Fade-Away")
2007	The Man from Earth	Edith	
2009	Mental	Andrea Jennings	("Life and Limb")
2010	Desperate Housewives	Iris Beckley	("Chromolume No. 7" and "My Two Young Men")
2012	Petunia	Martha McDougal	
2012	Model Minority	Nurse Alice Stanton	
2012	Grey's Anatomy	Carrie Reisler	("Have You Seen Me Lately?")
2013	Angel's Perch	Betsy	
2014	Blue Jay	Sue	short
2017	Suburbicon	Eileen	
2017	Weekend Encounter	Shirley	short
2018	Boomers	Ruth Sutton	(18 episodes)
2022	Days of Our Lives	Mother Superior	
