= Carol Flint =

American television producer and writer

Carol Flint is an American television producer and writer best known for her work on ER and The West Wing. She studied at New College of Florida.

== Career ==
Carol Flint started her writing career in 1978, which lead to her writing the television series China Beach (1988–1991). After that series ended, she started working on the television series L.A. Law in 1991, writing the episodes "The Nut Before Christmas," "From Here to Paternity" and "Love in Bloom".

In 1994, she started working on the NBC drama ER, which she also co-produced. She wrote and executive produced the series Earth 2 (1994–1995). In 1999, she began work on The West Wing, and wrote five episodes for the series. More recently, she was a writer and co-producer of the series The Court, of which six episodes were produced but only three aired. In 2006, Flint co-produced the television series The Unit and Six Degrees. Flint recently completed a feature script for Warner Bros., entitled How It Was with Dooms. From 2009 to 2016, she was either consulting producer or co-executive producer for Royal Pains on USA Network, for which she also authored several episodes.

== Writing credits ==
- China Beach (1988)
- L.A. Law (1991)
- Earth 2 (1994–1995)
- ER (1995–1999)
- The Court (2002)
- The Big Time (2002)
- The West Wing (2003–2006)
- Duma (2005)
- The Unit (2006)
- Royal Pains (2009–2016)

== Producer ==
- L.A. Law (1986)
- China Beach (1988)
- Earth 2 (1994)
- ER (1994)
- The Court (2002)
- The Big Time (2002)
- Six Degrees (2006)
- The West Wing (2003–2006)
- The Unit (2006)
- Royal Pains (2009–2016)
