= Jeanie Boulet =

Fictional character from the television series ER

- Gloria Reuben as Jeanie Boulet
- First appearance: January 19, 1995 (1x14, "Long Day's Journey")
- Last appearance: January 3, 2008 (14x11 "Status Quo")
- Portrayed by: Gloria Reuben
- Duration: 1995–99, 2008

In-universe information
- Gender: Female
- Occupation: Physician assistant (1995–1999); Head of HIV Clinics and Counselor (Present)
- Spouses: Alec 'Al' Boulet (ex-husband, deceased) Reggie Moore (m. 1999, separated)
- Children: Carlos Moore (adopted)
- Born: c. 1966 in LaVerne, Mississippi

Jeanie Boulet is a fictional character from the television series ER. The role was portrayed by Gloria Reuben who debuted as a recurring character in the first season episode, "Long Day's Journey", aired on January 19, 1995. Reuben was promoted to the role of series regular as of the second season episode, "Days Like This", aired on November 2, 1995 and made her last regular appearance in the sixth season episode, "The Peace of Wild Things", aired on November 11, 1999.

During the series’ fourteenth season, Reuben would make a guest appearance in the episode "Status Quo", aired on January 3, 2008.

== Creation and development ==
Introduced in season 1, episode 14 "Long Day's Journey", Jeanie Boulet was initially a recurring character involved in the story arc of the regular character Dr. Peter Benton (played by Eriq La Salle). During the first season, Jeanie's storyline centred on her adulterous affair with Benton, which developed after he employed her to care for his senile mother.

Jeanie was unhappy in marriage to a philandering husband named Al (played by Wolfgang Bodison and Michael Beach). Benton was depicted as a talented, "self-assured" but "brooding", defensive and serious doctor. Contrastingly, Jeanie was portrayed as emotional, caring and sensitive. Reuben has described Jeanie as "strong-willed, sharp and intelligent, but, [she] has a dry sense of humor. She knows exactly what she's doing professionally, but she has a nurturing side, too."

The personality differences between the characters lead to several clashes on-screen initially, as both have different ideas about what's best for Benton's ailing and progressively senile mother. In episode 20 "Full Moon, Saturday Night", Jeanie orders for Benton's mother to be held in restraints to prevent injury; Furious, Benton removes the restraints, leading her to fall from her bed. Benton and Jeanie grow closer as he subsequently accepts her guidance on how to care for his mother.

In his book, Bedside Manners: George Clooney and ER, author Sam Keenleyside comments on the scenes, saying that the storyline was poignant, but that "it gets lost in all the machinations of the rest of the show." The beginning of a blossoming romance saw a change in Benton's disposition over the following episodes, Keenleyside notes that he

"seems to be thawing [...] It's well-worth asking what's brought all this on, and the answer seems to be — if his dinner with Jeanie is any indication — that he's a young doctor in love. Whether he continues his nice-guy routine while he plays second fiddle to Jeanie's husband remains to be seen, but giving Benton a love-interest, no matter how ill-fated, will offer his character some much needed life outside the hospital."

As the first season drew to a close in episode 25 "Everything Old is New Again", Benton is shown to be keen for their relationship to progress, asking Jeanie to leave her husband; by contrast Jeanie is reticent and pulls away, leaving the future of their relationship unclear. According to Keenleyside, this was a deliberate "loose thread [...] left dangling to pull [viewers] back on to [their] sofas next season." He predicts, "expect to see them together next September; that way the writers can gloss over all the messy in-between stuff and get right to the romance for the new season."

Jeanie progressed to regular character status in season 2. As the season came under way, it was revealed that her affair with Benton still continued, unbeknown to her husband, leaving Benton's authoritarian personality "uncomfortably weakened" as the third member of a love triangle. When Jeanie refused to leave her husband, the relationship ended on bad terms, setting up the next chapter in Jeanie's story as she finds employment as a Physician Assistant (PA) at the serial's focal setting of County Hospital's ER. This leads to hostilities from a dishevelled Benton, who proceeds to make her working life a "living hell", until she confronts him. In summary of the plot, Keenleyside noted that "it's nice to see Jeanie being allowed to move beyond the quiet forcefulness that has thus far marked her relationship with Peter, and it's even better to see Benton with his tail between his legs for a change."

As season 2 progressed, Jeanie was given storylines independent of Benton, allowing further character development as she interacts between other characters, staff and patients. This move was praised by Keenleyside, who commented, "this brief look at Jeanie, free from Benton's brooding presence, indicates that ER is definitely the place for her character. If she's allowed to continue to develop her own character, instead of being forced into Benton's background, she could become a complement to [Dr] Carter. Like Carter, she cares about her work, but she's not afraid to stand up for herself — especially when Benton is in her way." However, he does note that Jeanie is perhaps "thrust to the forefront too mechanically. She is forced to carry a heavier story load than her character is capable at this point." Episode 21 of season 2, "Take These Broken Wings", marked the beginning of one of Jeanie's notable storylines when her husband Al was admitted to the ER and subsequently diagnosed as HIV positive. As the second season drew to a close, Jeanie's HIV status was left in question, as was Dr Benton's.

In the opening episode of season 3, "Dr. Carter, I Presume?", ER writers dropped the "requisite bombshell" that Jeanie had tested positive for HIV, while Benton had tested negative. Jeanie decides to manage her illness in secrecy, refusing to divulge her status to her employers, a decision Benton disapproves of and he attempts to have her banned from treating patients with open wounds, although he falls short of revealing her secret.

Jeanie's decision not to reveal her serostatus to her employers was the result of an encounter with a seropositive patient in the AIDS outpatient ward at County Hospital. The man, realizing Jeanie worked at the hospital, urged her to seek treatment for her HIV elsewhere, due to negative repercussions that may occur in the workplace. As a result of this, Jeanie is forced to pay for her HIV cocktail medication herself.

In addition to the professional and medical implications of Jeanie's health status, the romantic implications were also explored later on in season 3. Keenleyside comments, "[Jeanie's] quietly reluctant decision not to go out with the friend of a patient hits just the right tone, registering not only her disappointment at having to pass up this opportunity, but also her realization that she may never be able to accept another. The counterpart to this scene, provided by Benton's tantalizing encounter with his former girlfriend, Carla, drives home the pain of [Jeanie's] situation very powerfully, although a deeper look at the romantic challenges facing people with HIV would still be very much welcome."

== Storylines ==
Jeanie Boulet was first introduced in season 1 as a recurring character. She was the physical therapist hired by Dr. Peter Benton to care for his aging mother. Jeanie, who was married at the time, soon began a romantic relationship with Benton but things fizzled when she could not make a decision about her marriage. She reappeared as a series regular a few episodes later in season 2, as a new physician assistant at the County General ER. Toward the end of the season, her husband Al was admitted to the hospital and it was discovered that he had contracted HIV. Jeanie and Al had been separated since the beginning of the season, but he may have contracted the virus years earlier as he had slept with other women during the time they were married.

Jeanie got tested for HIV and urged Benton, her recent lover, to undergo testing as well. In the season 3 premiere it was revealed that Benton did not have the virus; Jeanie, however, was HIV-positive. Benton questioned whether Jeanie should still be working in the ER, but he later accepted that she would be able to take appropriate precautions and supported her decision to remain at County. Later in the series, Jeanie and Peter actually became somewhat close, with Jeanie helping Peter cope with the realization that his son Reese was deaf. Dr. Kerry Weaver figured out quickly that Jeanie was HIV+ but kept this to herself (though she strongly hints to a surprised and then relieved Jeanie that she knows the truth but is happy Jeanie will remain at County) and becomes angry at Dr. Mark Greene when he unethically looks up Jeanie's HIV status after Al is hospitalized for treatment of pneumonia (though Kerry and Mark, with Jeanie's help, eventually figure out how to keep Jeanie from losing her job, and Mark makes it clear later that he will not try to ruin her career either).

During season three, Jeanie embarked on her first romantic relationship since her HIV diagnosis, with a doctor from Infectious Diseases named Greg Fischer. However, during this time she also rekindles her closeness with Al and eventually Dr. Fischer breaks up with her upon finding out about the reunion. Jeanie and Al move back in together and renew their relationship. In season four, Al loses his job when an accident at the job site forces him to admit to his coworkers (and friends) that he is HIV positive and he is shunned by them. Al gets another job in Atlanta during the 4th season and plans to move; Jeanie declines to join him, and they part ways once more. Al was never seen on the show again but Jeanie bitterly references him in Season 5 when she learns she has contracted Hepatitis C and is sure Al is responsible; however, when she goes off to confront him over the phone Al faxes her accurate medical records which show he does NOT have that illness (this helps explain in a much later-run return by Jeanie why she has specific and emotional information about what has happened to Al since then).

It is also at this time that Jeanie develops a strong friendship with Kerry Weaver. Jeanie had initially been afraid that Weaver might terminate her position at County if she found out about Jeanie's HIV status. This turned out not to be the case, and Weaver laid out restrictions under which Jeanie would be allowed to continue treating patients while HIV positive. Kerry and Jeanie's friendship was tested when Kerry was forced to fire Jeanie for budgetary reasons. Jeanie accused Kerry of trying to fire her over her HIV status, as Jeanie had been forced to break one of her workplace restrictions in order to treat a trauma patient earlier, and threatened to sue the hospital for discrimination. Dr. Anspaugh gave Jeanie her job back to avoid the lawsuit, and Jeanie and Kerry eventually settled their difference.

In season four Jeanie becomes the part-time private care giver of Scott Anspaugh (portrayed by Trevor Morgan), the son of Dr. Donald Anspaugh, the chief of staff. Scott is battling B-cell lymphoma and is coping with depression. Only Jeanie seems to be able to raise his spirits and inspire hope in him. The two develop a strong friendship over a five episode arc which sadly ends in Scott's death.

In Season five, Jeanie starts a romance with a police officer named Reggie. Jeanie gets into a bad car accident with Doug Ross while on their way to a bus accident. Unfortunately, the accident reveals a setback with Jeanie's HIV status and she has to remain in hospital care until fully recovered.

Early in season six, Jeanie adopts an HIV positive baby boy called Carlos after his mother dies in the hospital, and marries a police officer named Reggie Moore (Cress Williams). She tries to stay on at County and parent her child, but eventually decides to leave County in order to spend more time with her family. The final episode Jeanie appeared in was the sixth episode of season six, which was titled "The Peace of Wild Things" in November 1999. She left with a standing offer from Kerry Weaver to return to County and her old job. However, she never returned to work at County.

Gloria Reuben as Jeanie Boulet in 2008

In the Season 14 episode "Status Quo", Jeanie Boulet briefly returned to the ER after 8 years in January 2008 when her son Carlos suffers a head injury during Physical Education class. Initially it is believed that he is fine; however, a CT Scan revealed that he had a growth on his brain. This is customarily a sign that HIV infection has progressed into an AIDS condition. Boulet didn't find any of her old colleagues she knew (like her friend Dr. Kerry Weaver) working there anymore and was only identified by Nurses Haleh Adams and Chuny Marquez. After initially having difficulty adjusting to the changes in her former workplace she permitted full treatment and came to support the decisions of the new staff of the ER—including new Attending Dr. Gregory Pratt with whom she initially had difficulty agreeing. It was partly because of her return and inspiration that Dr. Pratt was convinced to continue his job at County, as he had earlier given his two weeks notice of resignation when the hospital board dismissed his efforts to take on a leadership role in the ER.

In the time between her last appearance and return Jeanie and her husband Reggie have undergone a separation and have joint custody of their son. Jeanie also remains a counselor for young people with HIV Status. Her clinics—one on the North side of Chicago and another on the South—have become her personal mission and her time-consuming commitment to them contributed to the end of her marriage. She tells Pratt that her son helps to drive her and her cause to help others with HIV infection and that she doesn't know how she will cope if he were to die. She also says that her ex-husband Al died two years earlier from his HIV/AIDS condition. At his death he weighed only 78 pounds and was unable to even recognize her.

== Critical reception ==
Jeanie Boulet's return to the series as a guest character in 2008 was well received by television critics. A reviewer from New York Entertainment commented that her return was like a "welcome throwback to the days when it seemed like every episode forced Jeanie to process some piece of world-shattering news." The return storyline was described as a "classic Jeanie Boulet moment, as filtered through the show's new blunt-instrument writers [...] it was like it was 1995 all over again." Discussing Reuben's portrayal of the character, the reviewer said, "There's always been great pleasure in Reuben's beautiful, open face in moments like that; she played those scenes to the hilt, creating in us a great sympathy for her character [...] We couldn't stand to watch her suffer so, but we couldn't stop watching her suffer, and we died a little with every hurt the producers hit her with."

It has been suggested that the program-makers' decision to give Jeanie HIV was an attempt to draw attention to the illness to the black community, particularly black women. Jeanie — like the majority of female AIDS cases in America at the time in 1997 — was black, heterosexual, and acquired HIV from a long-term partner. However, it has been noted that some viewers may have been offended that out of all the sexually active characters in their serial, Jeanie — whose private life had not been extensively portrayed at that point — contracted the virus.

Aspects of the HIV storyline have been criticized, specifically that little airtime was dedicated to dramatizing clinical procedures determining whether Jeanie had been exposed to HIV. When Jeanie discovered that her husband had AIDS in the second season finale, Jeanie has a blood test and sends it off for analysis to see if she also had the virus; however, viewers were not shown the multiple clinical procedures involved in the testing, and the following episodes concentrated on post-test rituals. Nonetheless the storyline has been credited for raising awareness to HIV and more importantly showing the new medicines and treatments in helping treat the disease.
