= Lydia Woodward =

American television writer and producer

- Born: United States
- Occupations: Television writer, television producer
- Writing career
- Genre: Screenwriting
- Notable work: ER

Lydia Woodward is an American television writer and producer. She has worked as both a writer and producer on the television series ER. She signed a deal with Warner Bros. Television in 2001.

== Positions held ==
- Pan Am (Co-Executive Producer, Writer)
- The Riches (Consulting Producer, Writer)
- Presidio Med (Co-Creator, Executive Producer, Writer)
- Citizen Baines (Creator, Executive Producer, Writer)
- ER (Executive Producer, Supervising Producer, Consulting Producer, Writer)
- Keys (Supervising Producer)
- Angel Street (Supervising Producer, Writer)
- China Beach (Executive Script Consultant, Producer, Writer)
- St. Elsewhere (Story Editor, Writer)
- Hooperman (Writer)
- Slap Maxwell (Writer)
- Miss Lonelyhearts (Producer)

== Awards and nominations ==
Woodward has won one Emmy Award and been nominated for 7 other Primetime Emmy Award for Outstanding Drama Series.
