= ER (TV series) =

American medical drama television series (1994–2009)

- Genre: Medical drama
- Created by: Michael Crichton
- Starring: Anthony Edwards; George Clooney; Sherry Stringfield; Noah Wyle; Julianna Margulies; Eriq La Salle; Gloria Reuben; Laura Innes; Maria Bello; Alex Kingston; Kellie Martin; Paul McCrane; Goran Višnjić; Michael Michele; Erik Palladino; Ming-Na; Maura Tierney; Sharif Atkins; Mekhi Phifer; Parminder Nagra; Linda Cardellini; Shane West; Scott Grimes; John Stamos; David Lyons; Angela Bassett
- Theme music composer: James Newton Howard (1994–2006; 2009); Martin Davich (2006–2009)
- Composer: Martin Davich
- Country of origin: United States
- Original language: English
- No. of seasons: 15
- No. of episodes: 331 (list of episodes)

Production
- Executive producers: Michael Crichton; John Wells; Christopher Chulack; Lydia Woodward; Carol Flint; Jack Orman; David Zabel
- Camera setup: Single-camera
- Running time: 45 minutes
- Production companies: Constant c Productions; Amblin Television; Warner Bros. Television

Original release
- Network: NBC
- Release: September 19, 1994 – April 2, 2009

Related
- Third Watch

ER is an American medical drama television series created by Michael Crichton that aired on NBC from September 19, 1994, to April 2, 2009, with a total of 331 episodes spanning 15 seasons. It was produced by Constant c Productions and Amblin Television, in association with Warner Bros. Television. ER follows the inner life of the emergency room (ER) of Cook County General Hospital, a fictionalized version of the real Cook County Hospital, in Chicago, and the various critical professional, ethical, and personal issues faced by the department's physicians, nurses, and staff.

The show is the second-longest-running primetime medical drama in American television history behind Grey's Anatomy. The highest-awarded medical drama, ER won 128 industry awards from 442 nominations, including the Peabody Award, TCA Award for Program of the Year, and Primetime Emmy Award for Outstanding Drama Series. As of 2014, ER had grossed over $3 billion in television revenue. It is considered one of the best medical dramas of all time, pioneering the field of medical fiction and setting a model for other contemporary medical dramas to follow.

== Production ==
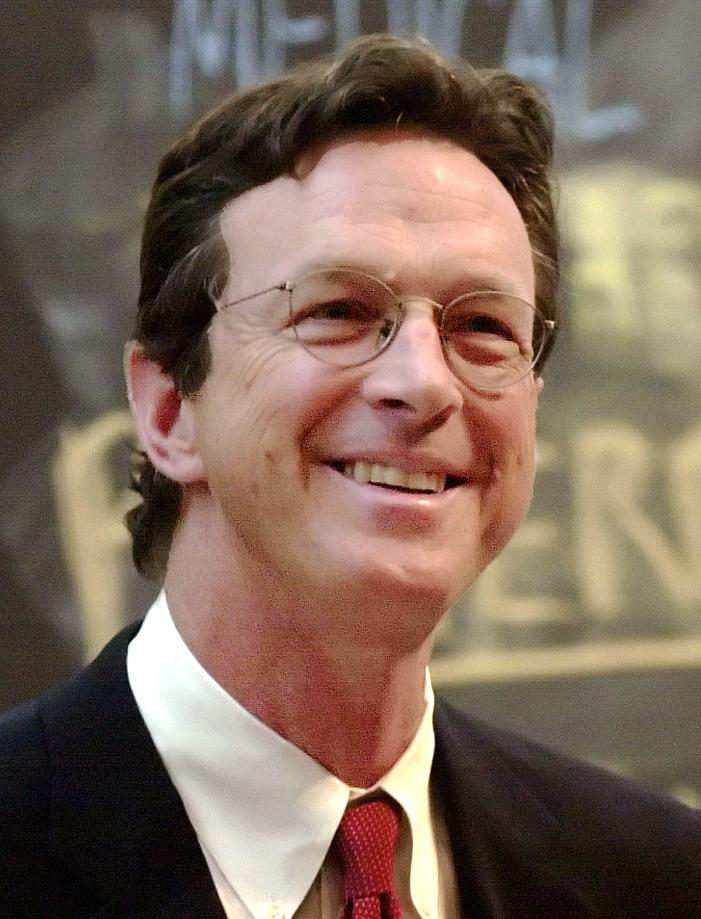
Michael Crichton in 2002

In 1974, author Michael Crichton wrote a screenplay then titled "EW" (for Emergency Ward) based on his own experiences as a medical student in a busy hospital emergency room. Producers were not interested in the screenplay, and Crichton turned to other topics. In 1990, he published the novel Jurassic Park, and in 1993 began a collaboration with director Steven Spielberg on the film adaptation of the book.

After its release, Crichton and Spielberg then turned to what was now known as ER, but Spielberg decided to film the story as a two-hour pilot for a television series rather than as a feature film after considering the potential for various stories to be told in the setting. He passed the script on to a team at his production company, Amblin Entertainment. Anthony Thomopoulos, then head of Amblin's television division, got in touch with then CEO of Warner Bros. Television, Les Moonves, about the idea for the series and to send the script. Spielberg's Amblin Television provided John Wells as the show's executive producer.

Warner Bros. Television pitched ER to NBC, alongside Crichton, Spielberg, and Wells. Warren Littlefield, head of NBC Entertainment at the time, liked the project, but there was much debate and controversy among other executives at NBC, who were dubious about the nature of the series. NBC offered a chance to make a two-hour made-for-TV movie from the script, which was rejected. They then tried to get the show greenlit at rival networks before returning to NBC, who this time around ordered a pilot.

The script used to shoot the pilot was virtually unchanged from what Crichton had written in 1974. The only substantive changes made by the producers in 1994 were that a male character was changed to a female character (Susan Lewis) and Peter Benton character's race was changed to African-American. The running time was shortened by about 20 minutes in order for the pilot to air in a two-hour block on network TV. Because of a lack of time and money necessary to build a set, the pilot episode of ER was filmed in the former Linda Vista Hospital in Los Angeles, an old facility that had ceased operating in 1990. A set modeled after Los Angeles County General Hospital's emergency room was built soon afterward at the Warner Bros. Studios in Burbank, California, although the show makes extensive use of location shoots in Chicago, most notably the city's famous "L" train platforms.

Littlefield was impressed by the series: "We were intrigued, but we were admittedly a bit spooked in attempting to go back into that territory a few years after St. Elsewhere. With Spielberg attached behind the scenes, NBC ordered six episodes. "ER premiered opposite a Monday Night Football game on ABC and did surprisingly well. Then we moved it to Thursday and it just took off," commented Littlefield. ER's success surprised the networks and critics alike, as David E. Kelley's new medical drama Chicago Hope was expected to crush the new series, airing directly opposite ER in the Thursday 10:00 pm time slot over on CBS.

Crichton was credited as an executive producer until his death in November 2008, and also posthumously for the final season. Wells, the series' other initial executive producer, served as showrunner for the first four seasons. He was the show's most prolific writer and became a regular director in later years. Lydia Woodward was a part of the first season production team and became an executive producer for the third season. She took over as showrunner for the fifth season while Wells focused on the development of other series, including Trinity, Third Watch, and The West Wing. John Wells continued to serve as the primary Executive Producer for the remainder of the series. Lydia Woodward left her executive producer position at the end of the sixth season but continued to write episodes throughout the series run.

Joe Sachs, who was a writer and producer of the series, believed keeping a commitment to medical accuracy was extremely important: "We'd bend the rules but never break them. A medication that would take 10 minutes to work might take 30 seconds instead. We compressed time. A 12- to 24-hour shift gets pushed into 48 minutes. But we learned that being accurate was important for more reasons than just making real and responsible drama."

Woodward was replaced as showrunner by Jack Orman. Orman was recruited as a writer-producer for the series in its fourth season after a successful stint working on CBS's JAG. He was quickly promoted and became an executive producer and showrunner for the series' seventh season. He held these roles for three seasons before leaving the series at the end of the ninth season. Orman was also a frequent writer and directed three episodes of the show.

David Zabel served as the series' head writer and executive producer in its later seasons. He initially joined the crew for the eighth season and became an executive producer and showrunner for the twelfth season onward. Zabel was the series' most frequent writer, contributing to 41 episodes. He also made his directing debut on the series. Christopher Chulack was the series' most frequent director and worked as a producer on all 15 seasons. He became an executive producer in the fourth season but occasionally scaled back his involvement in later years to focus on other projects.

Other executive producers include writers Carol Flint, Neal Baer, R. Scott Gemmill, Joe Sachs, Dee Johnson, Lisa Zwerling, and Janine Sherman Barrois. Several of these writers and producers had background in healthcare: Joe Sachs was an emergency physician, while Lisa Zwerling and Neal Baer were both pediatricians. The series' crew was recognized with awards for writing, directing, producing, film editing, sound editing, casting, and music.

== Broadcast ==
Following the broadcast of its two-hour pilot on September 19, 1994, ER premiered Thursday, September 22 at 10pm. It remained in the same Thursday time slot for its entire run, capping the Must See TV primetime block. ER is NBC's third longest-running drama, after Law & Order: Special Victims Unit and Law & Order, and the second longest-running American primetime medical drama of all time, behind ABC's Grey's Anatomy. Starting with season seven, ER was broadcast in the 1080i HD format, appearing in letterbox format when presented in standard definition. On April 2, 2008, NBC announced that the series would return for its fifteenth season. The fifteenth season was originally scheduled to run for 19 episodes before retiring with a two-hour series finale to be broadcast on March 12, 2009, but NBC announced in January 2009 that it would extend the show by an additional three episodes to a full 22-episode order as part of a deal to launch a new series by John Wells titled Police, later retitled Southland. ER's final episode aired on April 2, 2009; the two-hour episode was preceded by a one-hour retrospective special. The series finale charged $425,000 per 30-second ad spot, more than three times the season's rate of $135,000. From season 4 to season 6 ER cost a record-breaking $13 million per episode. TNT also paid a record price of $1 million an episode for four years of repeats of the series during that time. The cost of the first three seasons was $2 million per episode and seasons 7 to 9 cost $8 million per episode.

== Cast and characters ==
Original cast of the show (1994–1995)

Final season cast (2008–2009)

The original starring cast consisted of Anthony Edwards as Dr. Mark Greene, George Clooney as Dr. Doug Ross, Sherry Stringfield as Dr. Susan Lewis, Noah Wyle as medical student John Carter, and Eriq La Salle as Dr. Peter Benton. As the series continued, some key changes were made: Nurse Carol Hathaway, played by Julianna Margulies, who attempts suicide in the original pilot script, was made into a regular cast member. Ming-Na debuted in the middle of the first season as medical student Jing-Mei "Deb" Chen, but did not return for the second season; she returns in season 6 episode 10. Gloria Reuben and Laura Innes joined the series as Physician Assistant Jeanie Boulet and Dr. Kerry Weaver, respectively, by the second season.

In the third season, a series of cast additions and departures began that saw the original cast leave. Stringfield was the first to exit the series, reportedly upsetting producers, who believed she wanted to negotiate for more money; but in fact the actress disliked the fame resulting from her appearance in the series. She returned to the series from 2001 until 2005. Clooney departed the series in 1999 to pursue a film career, and Margulies exited the following year. Season eight saw the departure of La Salle and Edwards when Benton left County General and Greene died from a brain tumor. Wyle left the series after season 11 to spend more time with his family, but returned for two multi-episode appearances in the show's twelfth and final seasons. Maria Bello as Dr. Anna Del Amico, Alex Kingston as Dr. Elizabeth Corday, Paul McCrane as Dr. Robert Romano, Kellie Martin as medical student Lucy Knight, Goran Višnjić as Dr. Luka Kovač, Michael Michele as Dr. Cleo Finch, Erik Palladino as Dr. Dave Malucci, Maura Tierney as Nurse Abby Lockhart, Sharif Atkins as medical student Michael Gallant, and Mekhi Phifer as Dr. Greg Pratt all joined the cast as the seasons went on. In the much later seasons, cast additions included Parminder Nagra as medical student Neela Rasgotra, Scott Grimes as Dr. Archie Morris, Linda Cardellini as Nurse Sam Taggart, Shane West as Dr. Ray Barnett, John Stamos as Paramedic Tony Gates, David Lyons as Dr. Simon Brenner, and Angela Bassett as Dr. Cate Banfield.

ER had many frequently seen recurring cast members who played key roles such as paramedics, hospital support staff, nurses, and doctors. ER also featured a sizable roster of well-known guest stars, some making rare television appearances, who typically played patients in an episode appearances or multi-episode arcs.

== Episodes ==
Season	Episodes	Originally released		Rank	Rating	Viewers (millions)
Season	Episodes	First released	Last released	Rank	Rating	Viewers (millions)
1	25	September 19, 1994	May 18, 1995	2	20.0	30.1
2	22	September 21, 1995	May 16, 1996	1	22.0	35.7
3	22	September 26, 1996	May 15, 1997	1	21.2	33.9
4	22	September 25, 1997	May 14, 1998	2	20.4	33.3
5	22	September 24, 1998	May 20, 1999	1	17.8	29.6
6	22	September 30, 1999	May 18, 2000	4	16.9	29.8
7	22	October 12, 2000	May 17, 2001	2	15.0	27.0
8	22	September 27, 2001	May 16, 2002	3	14.2	26.1
9	22	September 26, 2002	May 15, 2003	6	13.1	22.7
10	22	September 25, 2003	May 13, 2004	8	12.9	21.5
11	22	September 23, 2004	May 19, 2005	16	10.4	17.5
12	22	September 22, 2005	May 18, 2006	30	8.1	14.2
13	23	September 21, 2006	May 17, 2007	40	7.4	12.0
14	19	September 27, 2007	May 15, 2008	54	3.2	8.7
15	22	September 25, 2008	April 2, 2009	37	6.7	9.0

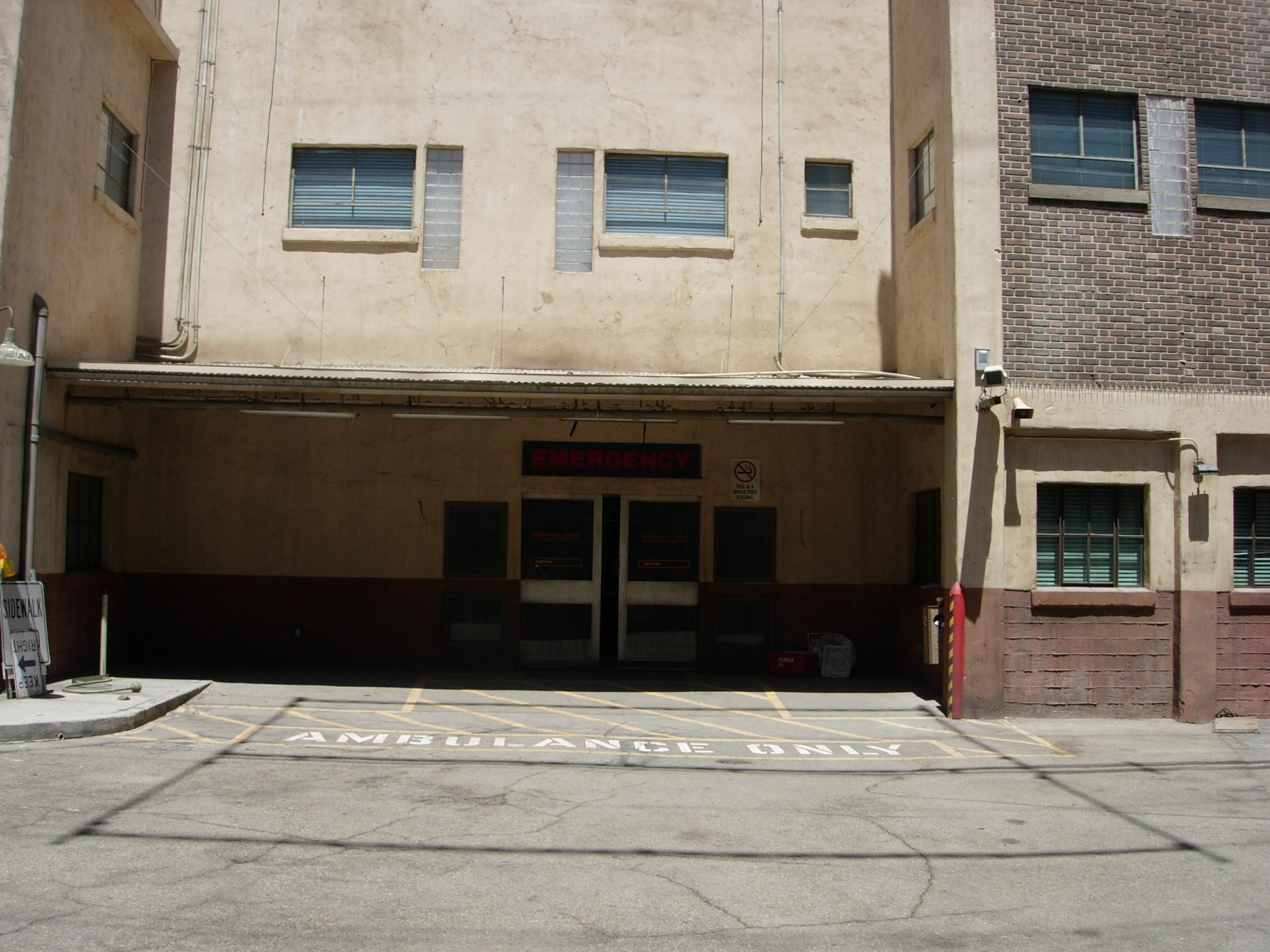
ER set at the Warner Bros. Studios in Burbank, California

A typical episode centered on the ER, with most scenes set in the hospital or surrounding streets. In addition, most seasons included at least one storyline located completely outside of the ER, often outside of Chicago. Over the span of the series, stories took place in the Congo, Iraq, France, and Sudan. One early storyline involved a road trip taken by Dr. Ross and Dr. Greene to California, and a season eight episode included a storyline in Hawaii featuring Dr. Greene and Dr. Corday. Beginning in season nine, storylines started to include the Congo, featuring Dr. Kovač, Dr. Carter, and Dr. Pratt. "We turned some attention on the Congo and on Darfur when nobody else was. We had a bigger audience than a nightly newscast will ever see, making 25 to 30 million people aware of what was going on in Africa," ER producer John Wells said. "The show is not about telling people to eat their vegetables, but if we can do that in an entertaining context, then there's nothing better." The series also focused on sociopolitical issues such as HIV and AIDS, organ transplants, mental illness, racism, human trafficking, euthanasia, poverty, and gay rights.

Some episodes used creative formats, such as the 1997 "Ambush," which was broadcast live twice, once for the east coast and again three hours later for the west coast, and 2002's "Hindsight," which ran in reverse time as it followed one character, Dr. Kovač, through the events of a Christmas Eve shift and the Christmas party that preceded it.

=== Crossover with Third Watch ===
The episode "Brothers and Sisters" (first broadcast on April 25, 2002) begins a crossover that concludes on the Third Watch episode "Unleashed" in which Dr. Lewis enlists the help of Officers Maurice Boscorelli and Faith Yokas to find her sister and niece.

== Ratings ==
American seasonal rankings based on average total viewers per episode of ER on NBC are tabulated below. Each American network television season starts in late September and ends in late May, which coincides with the completion of May sweeps. All times mentioned in this section were in the Eastern and Pacific time zones. Ratings for seasons 1–2 are listed in households (the percentage of households watching the program), while ratings for seasons 3–15 are listed in viewers.

Season	Episodes	Timeslot (ET)	Season premiere	Season finale	TV season	Viewer rank (#)	Viewers (in millions)
1	25	Thursday 10:00 pm	September 19, 1994	May 18, 1995	1994–1995	2	28.5
2	22	Thursday 10:00 pm	September 21, 1995	May 16, 1996	1995–1996	1	32.0
3	22	Thursday 10:00 pm	September 26, 1996	May 15, 1997	1996–1997	1	30.79
4	22	Thursday 10:00 pm	September 25, 1997	May 14, 1998	1997–1998	2	30.2
5	22	Thursday 10:00 pm	September 24, 1998	May 20, 1999	1998–1999	1	25.4
6	22	Thursday 10:00 pm	September 30, 1999	May 18, 2000	1999–2000	4	24.95
7	22	Thursday 10:00 pm	October 12, 2000	May 17, 2001	2000–2001	2	22.4
8	22	Thursday 10:00 pm	September 27, 2001	May 16, 2002	2001–2002	3	22.1
9	22	Thursday 10:00 pm	September 26, 2002	May 15, 2003	2002–2003	6	19.99
10	22	Thursday 10:00 pm	September 25, 2003	May 13, 2004	2003–2004	8	19.04
11	22	Thursday 10:00 pm	September 23, 2004	May 19, 2005	2004–2005	16	15.17
12	22	Thursday 10:00 pm	September 22, 2005	May 18, 2006	2005–2006	30	12.06
13	23	Thursday 10:00 pm	September 21, 2006	May 17, 2007	2006–2007	40	11.56
14	19	Thursday 10:00 pm	September 27, 2007	May 15, 2008	2007–2008	54	9.20
15	22	Thursday 10:00 pm	September 25, 2008	April 2, 2009	2008–2009	37	10.30

In its first year, ER attracted an average of 19 million viewers per episode, becoming the year's second most watched television show, just behind Seinfeld. In the following two seasons (1995–1997), ER was the most watched show in North America. For almost five years, ER battled for the top spot against Seinfeld, but in 1998, Seinfeld ended and then ER became number one again. The series finale attracted 16.4 million viewers. The show's highest rating came during the episode "Hell and High Water" with 48 million viewers and a 45% market share. It was the highest for a regularly scheduled drama since a May 1985 installment of Dallas received a 46. The share represents the percentage of TVs in use tuned in to that show.

== Critical reception ==
Throughout the series ER received acclaim from critics and fans alike. Marvin Kitman from Newsday said: "It's like M*A*S*H with just the helicopters showing up and no laughs. E.R. is all trauma; you never get to know enough about the patients or get involved with them. It's just treat, release and move on." Richard Zoglin from Time stated that it's "probably the most realistic fictional treatment of the medical profession TV has ever presented." Miles Beller from The Hollywood Reporter called the series "television that makes a difference; a series as true as a heartbeat, as insistent as an ambulance’s wail."

NBC launched the show at the same time that CBS launched its own medical drama, Chicago Hope, and many critics drew comparisons between the two. Eric Mink, writing for the New York Daily News, concluded that ER might rate more highly in the Nielsens but Chicago Hope told better stories, while Alan Rich, writing for Variety, felt both shows were "riveting, superior TV fare."

In 2002, TV Guide ranked ER No. 22 on their list of "Greatest Shows of All Time," making it the second highest ranked medical drama on the list (after St. Elsewhere at No. 20). Also, the episode "Love's Labor Lost" was ranked No. 6 on 100 Greatest Episodes of All Time list having earlier been ranked No. 3. In 2008, the show was placed No. 19 on Entertainment Weekly's "New TV Classics" list. In 2012, ER was voted Best TV Drama on ABC's 20/20 special episode "Best in TV: The Greatest TV Shows of Our Time." In 2013, the Writers Guild of America ranked ER No. 28 on their list of "101 Best Written TV Series."

=== Awards and nominations ===
ER has won 128 industry awards from 442 nominations, including the Peabody Award in 1995, TCA Award for Program of the Year in 1995, and Primetime Emmy Award for Outstanding Drama Series in 1996. It was also nominated for 124 Primetime Emmy Awards (with 23 wins), 25 Golden Globe Awards (with one win), 18 Screen Actors Guild Awards (with eight wins), 12 Directors Guild of America Awards (with four wins), 8 TCA Awards (with two wins), 5 Writers Guild of America Awards (with one win), and 3 Producers Guild of America Awards (with two wins).

== Distribution ==
=== Home media ===
Warner Home Video has released all 15 seasons in Region 1, Region 2, and Region 4.

In the United Kingdom (Region 2), The Complete Series boxset was released on October 26, 2009. On September 12, 2016, the series was re-released in three box sets, Seasons 1–5, Seasons 6–10, and Seasons 11–15.

DVD title	No. of episodes	Release dates		
DVD title	No. of episodes	Region 1	Region 2	Region 4
ER: The Complete First Season (1994–1995)	25	August 26, 2003	February 23, 2004	April 28, 2004
ER: The Complete Second Season (1995–1996)	22	April 27, 2004	July 26, 2004	July 15, 2004
ER: The Complete Third Season (1996–1997)	22	April 26, 2005	January 31, 2005	December 16, 2004
ER: The Complete Fourth Season (1997–1998)	22	December 20, 2005	May 16, 2005	April 27, 2005
ER: The Complete Fifth Season (1998–1999)	22	July 11, 2006	October 24, 2005	November 15, 2005
ER: The Complete Sixth Season (1999–2000)	22	December 19, 2006	April 3, 2006	May 5, 2006
ER: The Complete Seventh Season (2000–2001)	22	May 15, 2007	September 18, 2006	October 3, 2006
ER: The Complete Eighth Season (2001–2002)	22	January 22, 2008	July 16, 2007	September 6, 2007
ER: The Complete Ninth Season (2002–2003)	22	June 17, 2008	October 29, 2007	October 31, 2007
ER: The Complete Tenth Season (2003–2004)	22	March 3, 2009	January 28, 2008	May 7, 2008
ER: The Complete Eleventh Season (2004–2005)	22	July 14, 2009	April 21, 2008	May 7, 2008
ER: The Complete Twelfth Season (2005–2006)	22	January 12, 2010	September 15, 2008	October 1, 2008
ER: The Complete Thirteenth Season (2006–2007)	23	July 6, 2010	November 3, 2008	April 29, 2009
ER: The Complete Fourteenth Season (2007–2008)	19	January 11, 2011	May 18, 2009	April 28, 2010
ER: The Final Season (2008–2009)	22	July 12, 2011	September 21, 2009	October 12, 2010

The DVD box sets of ER are unusual in the fact that they are all in anamorphic widescreen even though the first six seasons of the show were broadcast in a standard 4:3 format. ER was shot protecting for widescreen presentation, allowing the show to be presented in 16:9 open matte (leaving only the title sequence in the 4:3 format). However, as the production of the show was generally conceived with 4:3 presentation in mind, some episodes feature vignetting or unintended objects towards the sides of the frame that would not be visible when presented in the 4:3 format. These episodes also appear in the widescreen format when rerun on TNT HD, Pop, and streaming services.

In 2018, Hulu struck a deal with Warner Bros. Domestic Television Distribution to stream all 15 seasons of the show. The show arrived on HBO Max in January 2022.

=== Soundtrack ===
In 1996, Atlantic Records released an album of music from the first two seasons, featuring James Newton Howard's theme from the series in its on-air and full versions, selections from the weekly scores composed by Martin Davich (Howard scored the two-hour pilot, Davich scored all the subsequent episodes and wrote a new theme used from 2006 to 2009 until the final episode, when Howard's original theme returned) and songs used on the series.

ER (Original Television Theme Music and Score)

Soundtrack album by Various Artists
- Released: October 1, 1996
- Genre: Pop rock
- Length: 44:48
- Label: Atlantic Records

No.	Title	Length
1.	"Theme from ER"	3:02
2.	"Dr. Lewis and Renee (from "The Birthday Party")"	1:57
3.	"Canine Blues (from "Make of Two Hearts")"	2:27
4.	"Goodbye Baby Susie (from "Fevers of Unknown Origin")"	3:11
5.	"Doug and Carol (from "The Gift")"	1:59
6.	"Healing Hands"	4:25
7.	"The Hero (from "Hell and High Water")"	1:55
8.	"Carter, See You Next Fall (from "Everything Old Is New Again")"	1:28
9.	"Reasons for Living"	4:33
10.	"Dr. Greene and a Mother's Death (from "Love's Labor Lost")"	2:48
11.	"Raul Dies (from "The Healers")"	2:20
12.	"Hell and High Water (from "Hell and High Water")"	2:38
13.	"Hold On (from "Hell and High Water")"	2:47
14.	"Shep Arrives (from "The Healers")"	3:37
15.	"Shattered Glass (from "Hell and High Water")"	2:11
16.	"Theme from ER (TV Version)"	1:00
17.	"It Came Upon a Midnight Clear"	2:30
Total length:		44:48

=== Other media ===
- An ER video game developed by Legacy Interactive for Windows 2000 and XP was released in 2005.
- In the Mad episode "Pokémon Park / WWER," the show was parodied in the style of WWE.
- A recurring sketch called "Toy ER" in the Nickelodeon comedy series All That parodies the show, featuring Dr. Malady (Chelsea Brummet), Dr. Botch (Giovonnie Samuels), and Dr. Sax (Shane Lyons) "treating" damaged toys.
- A book about emergency medicine based on the TV series, The Medicine of ER: An Insider's Guide to the Medical Science Behind America's #1 TV Drama was published in 1996. Authors Alan Duncan Ross and Harlan Gibbs M.D. have hospital administration and ER experience, respectively, and are called fans of the TV show in the book's credits.
- An episode-by-episode rewatch podcast called Setting the Tone: An ER Retrospective launched in 2019, and has featured numerous cast and crew interviews, including Gloria Reuben, Abraham Benrubi, Noah Wyle, Lydia Woodward, Laura Innes, Carol Flint, John Frank Levy, Paul McCrane, and others.

=== Foreign adaptations ===
In March 2012, Warner Bros. International Television announced that they would sell the format rights to ER to overseas territories. This allowed foreign countries to produce their own version of the series.

In June 2013, Warner Bros. International Television and Emotion Production announced a Serbian version of ER. Urgentni centar premiered on October 6, 2014, on TV Prva. A total of 246 episodes of the show have been produced, spanning 4 seasons, with the series finale being shown on March 18, 2025.

In January 2014, Warner Bros. International Television with RCN, Fox International Channels and TC announced a Colombian version of ER.

In March 2014, Warner Bros. International Television and StarLight Films announced a Ukrainian version of ER.

In February 2015, Warner Bros. International Television and Medyapım announced a Turkish version of ER.

== Revival ==
Original cast member Noah Wyle revealed that in 2020 there were talks to revive the show. Development of that series stalled due to issues with the estate of creator Michael Crichton, and in early 2024, Wyle was announced as starring in a new medical drama from Warner Bros. and original ER showrunner John Wells, The Pitt. That August, the Crichton estate brought a lawsuit against Warner Bros., Wells, and Wyle, alleging that The Pitt was in fact an unauthorized remake of ER which could not be produced without the estate's approval; Warner Bros. has denied the allegation, calling The Pitt "a new and original show." In December 2024, WB filed a motion to dismiss the case, citing California's anti-SLAPP law. In January 2025, a judge allowed the case to proceed.

== See also ==
- The Pitt
