= Cast of ER =

Cast of American TV series

ER is an American medical drama television series created by Michael Crichton that aired on NBC from September 19, 1994, to April 2, 2009. It was produced by Constant c Productions and Amblin Television, in association with Warner Bros. Television. The series follows the inner life of the emergency room (ER) of fictional Cook County General Hospital in Chicago, and various critical issues faced by the room's physicians and staff.

ER featured a large ensemble cast that changed dramatically over its long run. The main cast was augmented by a wealth of recurring characters and award-winning guest stars.

== Main cast ==
The original starring cast consisted of Anthony Edwards as Dr. Mark Greene, George Clooney as Dr. Douglas "Doug" Ross, Sherry Stringfield as Dr. Susan Lewis, Noah Wyle as medical student (later Dr.) John Carter, and Eriq La Salle as Dr. Peter Benton. Julianna Margulies guest starred in the pilot as Nurse Carol Hathaway before becoming part of the regular cast.

The first additions to the main cast came in Season 2 with Gloria Reuben signing on as Physician Assistant Jeanie Boulet (recurring character in Season 1), and in Season 3 with Laura Innes as Dr. Kerry Weaver (recurring character in Season 2). In Season 4, Maria Bello signed on as Dr. Anna Del Amico (recurring character at the end of Season 3) and Alex Kingston joined the cast as Dr. Elizabeth Corday. Season 5 saw the addition of Kellie Martin as medical student Lucy Knight.

George Clooney's departure towards the end of Season 5 started a major cycle of main cast changes over the next few years. Season 6 opened with the addition of Paul McCrane as Dr. Robert "Rocket" Romano (recurring character in both Seasons 4 and 5), Croatian actor Goran Višnjić as Dr. Luka Kovač, and Michael Michele as Dr. Cleo Finch. A bit later in the season Erik Palladino joined as Dr. Dave Malucci, and Ming-Na returned to the series as Dr. Jing-Mei "Deb" Chen, reprising a recurring character she portrayed in Season 1. Soon after, Maura Tierney was added as Nurse (later Dr.) Abigail "Abby" Lockhart. Season 8 saw the arrival of Sharif Atkins as medical student (later Dr.) Michael Gallant, as well as the return of Dr. Susan Lewis when Sherry Stringfield reprised her role after having left the series in Season 3.

Mekhi Phifer joined the cast in Season 9 as Dr. Gregory "Greg" Pratt (recurring character at the end of Season 8). Season 10 saw the addition of Parminder Nagra as medical student (later Dr.) Neela Rasgotra and Linda Cardellini as Nurse Samantha "Sam" Taggart. Shane West joined the cast in Season 11 as Dr. Ray Barnett and Scott Grimes became part of the main cast in Season 12 as Dr. Archie Morris (recurring character in Seasons 10 and 11). Season 13 saw the addition of John Stamos as Dr. Anthony "Tony" Gates, reprising a role he had originated in Season 12 when he portrayed Gates the paramedic/medical student. Season 15 saw the final additions to the main cast, with David Lyons signing on as Dr. Simon Brenner (recurring character towards the end of Season 14) and Angela Bassett as Dr. Catherine "Cate" Banfield.

Notably, of the 26 main cast members that starred throughout ER's 15-season run, only seven were not featured in the final season: Gloria Reuben, Maria Bello, Kellie Martin, Michael Michele, Erik Palladino, Ming-Na, and Sharif Atkins. In addition, only four main cast members never made a return appearance of any type following their original stint: Maria Bello, Kellie Martin, Erik Palladino, and Mekhi Phifer.

=== Main characters ===
Actor	Character	Seasons														
Actor	Character	1	2	3	4	5	6	7	8	9	10	11	12	13	14	15
Anthony Edwards	Mark Greene	M	M	M	M	M	M	M	M							S (Note: The actor was credited along with the main cast members in the episodes they appeared in.)
George Clooney	Doug Ross	M	M	M	M	M	S.G									S
Sherry Stringfield	Susan Lewis	M	M	M					M	M	M	M	M			S
Noah Wyle	John Carter	M	M	M	M	M	M	M	M	M	M	M	S.G			S
Julianna Margulies	Carol Hathaway	M	M	M	M	M	M									S
Eriq La Salle	Peter Benton	M	M	M	M	M	M	M	M							S
Gloria Reuben	Jeanie Boulet	R	M	M	M	M	M								S.G	
Laura Innes	Kerry Weaver		R	M	M	M	M	M	M	M	M	M	M	M		S
Maria Bello	Anna Del Amico			R	M											
Alex Kingston	Elizabeth Corday				M	M	M	M	M	M	M	M				S
Kellie Martin	Lucy Knight					M	M									
Paul McCrane	Robert Romano				R	R	M	M	M	M	M					S.G
Goran Višnjić	Luka Kovač						M	M	M	M	M	M	M	M	S	S
Michael Michele	Cleo Finch						M	M	M							
Erik Palladino	Dave Malucci						M	M	M							
Ming-Na	Jing-Mei Chen	R					M	M	M	M	M	M				
Maura Tierney	Abby Lockhart						M	M	M	M	M	M	M	M	M	M
Sharif Atkins	Michael Gallant								M	M	M	S.G	R			
Mekhi Phifer	Greg Pratt								R	M	M	M	M	M	M	M
Parminder Nagra	Neela Rasgotra										M	M	M	M	M	M
Linda Cardellini	Sam Taggart										M	M	M	M	M	M
Shane West	Ray Barnett											M	M	M		R
Scott Grimes	Archie Morris										R	R	M	M	M	M
John Stamos	Tony Gates												G	M	M	M
David Lyons	Simon Brenner														R	M
Angela Bassett	Cate Banfield															M

=== Departures from the main cast ===
Sherry Stringfield's first departure from the show was in 1996, when her character, Susan Lewis, moved to Phoenix, Arizona, in the Season 3 episode "Union Station." In 2001, Stringfield returned to the series, reprising her role of Dr. Lewis, in the Season 8 episode "Never Say Never." She departed again after the Season 12 premiere, "Cañon City." This departure was not depicted, but was mentioned by character Kerry Weaver two episodes later, in "Man With No Name", as not coming in due to interviewing for a tenured position, having been denied tenure at County, and again later in "Wake Up," when Weaver explains that Susan accepted a tenure-track position at a hospital in Iowa City, Iowa. Stringfield returned once again for the series finale.

After playing Anna Del Amico for one season, Maria Bello was not part of the ensemble cast when Season 5 began. Like Susan Lewis's second exit, her character's departure was mentioned but not depicted: in the season premiere, "Day for Knight," John Carter explains to new medical student Lucy Knight that the locker she is inheriting previously belonged to Del Amico, who returned to Philadelphia to rejoin a prestigious Pediatrics unit there and be with her family and boyfriend.

George Clooney left the show in the Season 5 episode "The Storm (Part II)," when his character, Doug Ross, resigned before being fired for his involvement in a patient's death. Clooney made a cameo appearance in the Season 6 episode "Such Sweet Sorrow" when his character reunited with Carol Hathaway and appeared in the Season 15 episode "Old Times" where his character was the attending physician caring for a terminal organ donor in Seattle.

Gloria Reuben departed early in Season 6, in the episode "The Peace of Wild Things," when her character, Jeanie Boulet, decided to become a stay-at-home mom and care for her newly adopted HIV-positive baby. Reuben returned in the Season 14 episode "Status Quo" when her character's son was brought into the ER.

Kellie Martin, who played medical student Lucy Knight, left the series midway through Season 6 in the episode "All in The Family," when her character was killed by a patient with undiagnosed schizophrenia; his psychotic break occurred before a backed-up psychiatry department could arrive in the ER for a consult.

Julianna Margulies left the show at the end of Season 6, in the episode "Such Sweet Sorrow," when her character, Carol Hathaway, decided on the spur of the moment to go to Seattle, Washington, and reunite with Doug Ross, her true love and the father of her twin daughters. Margulies returned in the Season 15 episode "Old Times," with her character coordinating transplant efforts from a single organ donor in Seattle.

Erik Palladino departed early in Season 8, in the episode "Never Say Never," after his character, Dave Malucci, was fired by Kerry Weaver. While she initially fired him for having sex with an off-duty EMT and for an erroneous diagnosis resulting in a patient's death, her personal dislike for him was the real reason for his termination.

Eriq La Salle's character, Peter Benton, departed in the Season 8 episode "I'll Be Home for Christmas." He took a job with a set schedule at another hospital in order to spend more time with his son, Reese, and his girlfriend, former fellow ER doctor Cleo Finch. La Salle returned for two more episodes in Season 8 and then again for two episodes in Season 15, including the series finale.

Michael Michele's character, Cleo Finch, departed in the Season 8 episode "I'll Be Home for Christmas" with her boyfriend, and fellow doctor, Peter Benton, after having previously taken a job at the same hospital (in fact it was she who arranged the interview which resulted in Benton's job offer). Michele made a cameo appearance in the Season 8 episode "On the Beach" at Mark Greene's funeral. Cleo did not return to the show after that, but Peter confirmed they had married and were raising Reese together in the series finale.

Anthony Edwards's character, Mark Greene, died of a brain tumor in Season 8's penultimate episode, "On the Beach." Anthony Edwards was still credited in the Season 8 finale episode "Lockdown" as a tribute to what both the actor and character had meant to the series. Edwards returned in the Season 15 episode "Heal Thyself" where he appeared in multiple flashback scenes to give insight into the past of Catherine Banfield.

Paul McCrane's character, Robert Romano, whose arm had been severed just above the elbow by a helicopter's tail rotor in the Season 9 premiere "Chaos Theory," died in the Season 10 episode "Freefall." A helicopter that was taking off from the hospital roof was buffeted by strong winds, causing it to crash on the roof and plummet over the side of the building; it fell into a crowded ambulance bay and landed squarely on Romano. McCrane returned in the Season 15 episode "Heal Thyself" in a cameo set in 2002 (the current day of that episode took place in 2008).

Sharif Atkins left the series in the Season 10 episode "Where There's Smoke," when his character, Michael Gallant, revealed that the Army was sending him to Iraq. Atkins returned for two episodes during Season 11 where he is seen serving duty in Iraq and then for four episodes during Season 12 when he marries Neela Rasgotra before redeploying to Iraq where he is killed by an improvised explosive device while serving a second tour.

Alex Kingston's character, Elizabeth Corday, departed early in Season 11 in the episode "Fear" after getting in trouble for performing an illegal organ donation procedure; rather than being summarily fired, County offered her a demotion to a non-tenured position, but she turned it down and opted to return to England instead. Kingston returned for two episodes in Season 15, including the series finale.

Ming-Na departed midway through Season 11 in the episode "Twas The Night" when her character, Jing-Mei Chen, resigned in order to take care of her ailing father, whom she later euthanized. This was the second time her character left County General: in Season 1, medical student "Deb" Chen appeared in an eight episode story arc which concluded with her leaving medical school after accidentally leaving a guide wire in a patient's chest, deciding she was better suited to research than to applied medicine.

Noah Wyle left in the Season 11 finale, "The Show Must Go On." His character, John Carter, having received tenure at County, decided to reunite with his girlfriend Kem Likasu. Wyle returned for four episodes during Season 12 where he is seen practicing medicine in Darfur and then for five episodes during Season 15 when he needed a life-saving kidney transplant.

Laura Innes left midway through Season 13 in the episode "A House Divided," when a reluctant Luka Kovač was forced by budget cuts to fire her character, Kerry Weaver, due to her high salary. After bracing for a battle to keep her position, and in spite of the fact that Kovač realized he must find a way to keep her on staff, Weaver ultimately decided to resign from County and accept a job offer from a television station in Miami, Florida. Innes returned for two episodes in Season 15, including the series finale.

Shane West left in the Season 13 finale, "The Honeymoon Is Over," after his character, Ray Barnett, got hit by a truck, lost both his legs and returned to Baton Rouge with his mother to recuperate. West returned for three episodes during Season 15 when his character reunited with Neela Rasgotra.

Goran Višnjić, who played the character of Luka Kovač, departed in the Season 13 finale, "The Honeymoon Is Over," when he left for Croatia to care for his ailing father. He returned for seven episodes in Season 14 to wrap up his medical storyline and then made a brief appearance in the Season 15 episode "The Book of Abby" where he, his wife Abby Lockhart, and their son Joe embark on their new life together.

Mekhi Phifer departed in the Season 15 premiere, "Life After Death," when his character, Greg Pratt, died in the ER as the result of blast injuries suffered in an ambulance explosion.

Maura Tierney, who played the character of Abby Lockhart, departed early in Season 15 in the episode "The Book of Abby" with her husband Luka Kovač. Along with their son Joe, they presumably headed to Boston, where Abby had accepted a new job. She attempted to leave the ER quietly, however the rest of the staff made it known how much they would miss her. Nurse Haleh Adams showed Abby a hidden wall with the locker labels of all the past staff members since season one, with the exceptions of Carter (who refused to deface government property) and Boulet (who took hers as a memento when she departed in Season 6). Other names on the wall include departed former characters as well as some prominent writers and producers. Abby then left the ER and met Luka and Joe outside to embark on their new life together. Tierney returned in the Season 15 episode "Shifting Equilibrium" in a cameo during a phone conversation with Neela Rasgotra.

== Supporting cast ==
=== Desk clerks and other non-medical hospital staff ===
Actor/Actress	Character Name	Character Position	Years of Appearance
Abraham Benrubi	Jerry Markovic	Desk Clerk	1994–1999, 2002–2006, 2008–2009
Glenn Plummer	Timmy Rawlins	Desk Clerk	1994–1995, 2006–2007
Christine Healy	Harriet Spooner	Hospital Administrator	1994–1999
Małgorzata Gebel	(Dr.) Bogdana "Bob" Livetsky Romansky	ER Aide	1994–1995
Lisa Zane	Diane Leeds	Risk Management Administrator	1995
Rolando Molina	Rolando	Desk Clerk	1995–1996
Kristin Minter	Miranda "Randi" Fronczak	Desk Clerk	1995–2003
Charles Noland	E. Ray "E-Ray" Bozman	Desk Clerk	1995–1997
Skip Stellrecht	Miller	Hospital Chaplain	1996
Brent Jennings	Nat	Custodian	1997–2000
Mariska Hargitay	Cynthia Hooper	Desk Clerk	1997–1998
Jeff Cahill	Tony Fig	Transport Dispatcher	1998–1999
Djimon Hounsou	Mobalage Ekabo	Custodian	1999
Akosua Busia	Kobe "Kubby" Ekabo	Hospital Cafeteria Worker	1999
Andrew Bowen	Andrew "Andy"	Desk Clerk Temp	1999–2000
Pamela Mala Sinha	Amira	Desk Clerk	1999–2001, 2003–2005
Troy Evans	Frank Martin	Desk Clerk	1994, 2000–2009
Julie Delpy	Nicole	ER Aide	2001
Jordan Calloway	K.J. Thibeaux	Volunteer	2005–2006
Charlayne Woodard	Angela Gilliam	Medical Staff Affairs Manager	2006–2007
Jesse Borrego	Javier	Desk Clerk	2007–2008
Reiko Aylesworth	Julia Dupree	Hospital Chaplain	2007–2008

=== Nurses and other medical staff ===
Actor/Actress	Character Name	Character Position	Years of Appearance
Conni Marie Brazelton	Conni Oligario	ER Nurse	1994–2003
Suzanne Carney	Janet	OR Nurse	1994–2000
Ellen Crawford	Lydia Wright	ER Nurse	1994–2003, 2009
Deezer D	Malik McGrath	ER Nurse	1994–2009
Yvette Freeman	Haleh Adams	ER Nurse	1994–2009
Vanessa Marquez	Wendy Goldman	ER Nurse	1994–1997
Lily Mariye	Lily Jarvik	ER Nurse	1994–2009
Dinah Lenney	Shirley	Surgical Charge Nurse	1995–2004, 2006–2009
Laura Cerón	Ethel "Chuny" Márquez	ER Nurse	1995–2009
Lucy Rodriguez	Bjerke	Nurse	1996, 2000–2003
Bellina Logan	Kit	ICU, Pediatrics, and Surgical Nurse	1996–2003, 2005, 2008
Jenny O'Hara	Rhonda Sterling	Temp Nurse	1996
Meg Thalken	Dee McManus	Flight Nurse	1996, 1999–2001, 2005, 2008
Deborah May	Mary Cain	Nursing Director	1996–1997, 2002
Gedde Watanabe	Yosh Takata	ER Nurse	1997–2003
Kyle Richards	Dori Kerns	ER Nurse	1998–2006
Penny Johnson Jerald	Lynette Evans	Nurse Practitioner	1998–1999
Elizabeth Rodriguez	Sandra	OB Nurse	1999–2001
Morris Chestnut	Frank "Rambo" Bacon	ICU Nurse	2000
Mary Heiss	Mary	ER Nurse	2000–2008
Nadia Shazana	Jacy	Nurse	2001–2008
Linda Shing	Corazon	ICU Nurse	2001–2003
Sumalee Montano	Duvata Mahal	ER Nurse	2002–2005
Donal Logue	Chuck Martin	Flight Nurse	2003–2005
Cynthia Cervini	Anna Waldron	Nurse	2004, 2005
Kristen Johnston	Eve Peyton	Nurse Manager	2005
April Lee Hernández	Inez	ER Nurse	2005–2006
Angel Laketa Moore	Dawn Archer	ER Nurse	2006–2009
Kip Pardue	Ben Parker	ER Nurse	2006–2007
Nasim Pedrad	Suri	ER Nurse	2007–2009

=== Secondary doctors and medical students ===
Actor/Actress	Character Name	Character Position	Years of Appearance
Scott Jaeck	Dr. Steve Flint	Chief of Radiology	1994–1996, 1999–2000, 2002
William H. Macy	Dr. David Morgenstern	Chief of Surgery, Chief of Emergency Medicine	1994–1998, 2009
Tobin Bell	Dr. Wertz	Hospital Administrator	1994
John Terry	Dr. David "Div" Cvetic	Psychiatrist	1994
Tyra Ferrell	Dr. Sarah Langworthy	Surgical Resident	1994
Sam Anderson	Dr. Jack Kayson	Chief of Cardiology	1994–1999, 2001–2005, 2007
Rick Rossovich	Dr. John "Tag" Taglieri	Orthopedic Surgeon	1994–1995
Pierre Epstein	Dr. Alex Bradley	Chief of Staff	1994–1996
CCH Pounder	Dr. Angela Hicks	Surgical Attending	1994–1997
Amy Aquino	Dr. Janet Coburn	Chief of Obstetrics and Gynecology	1994–2009
Michael Ironside	Dr. William "Wild Willy" Swift	Chief of Emergency Medicine	1995, 1998, 2002
Christine Elise	Harper Tracy	Medical Student	1995–1996
David Spielberg	Dr. Neil Bernstein	Chief of Pediatrics	1995
Michael B. Silver	Dr. Paul Myers	Psychiatrist	1995, 1997–2000, 2003, 2005, 2008
Perry Anzilotti	Dr. Perry	Anesthesiologist	1995–2004, 2006, 2008
Ron Rifkin	Dr. Carl Vucelich	Cardiothoracic Surgeon	1995–1996
Megan Cole	Dr. Alice Upton	Pathologist	1996, 1998, 2000–2001, 2003
Matthew Glave	Dr. Dale Edson	Surgical Intern/Resident	1996–1999, 2001–2002
Omar Epps	Dr. Dennis Gant	Surgical Intern	1996–1997
John Aylward	Dr. Donald Anspaugh	Board member, Chief of Staff, General Surgeon	1996–2008
Jorja Fox	Dr. Maggie Doyle	ER Intern/Resident	1996–1999
Glenne Headly	Dr. Abby Keaton	Pediatric Surgeon	1996–1997
Don Perry	Dr. Sam Breedlove	Surgeon	1996–1997
Jami Gertz	Dr. Nina Pomerantz	Psychiatrist	1997
Harry Lennix	Dr. Greg Fischer	Infectious Disease Specialist	1997
Iqbal Theba	Dr. Zagerby	Ophthalmologist	1997, 2001
Ted Rooney	Dr. Tabash	Neonatologist	1997–1998
Chad Lowe	George Henry	Medical Student	1997, 2005
Joel de la Fuente	Ivan Fu	Medical Student	1997
Justin Henry	James Sasser	Medical Student	1997
Clancy Brown	Dr. Ellis West	Associate ER Attending Physician	1997–1998
Dennis Boutsikaris	Dr. David Kotlowitz	Surgeon	1998
James Le Gros	Dr. Max Rocher	Pediatrician	1998
David Brisbin	Dr. Alexander Babcock	Anesthesiologist	1998–2002
Vince Vieluf	Bernard Gamely	Medical Student	1998
Mare Winningham	Dr. Amanda Lee	Chief of Emergency Medicine	1998–1999
Carl Lumbly	Dr. Graham Baker	Plastic Surgeon	1999
Tom Gallop	Dr. Roger Julian	Chief of Genetics	1999
John Doman	Dr. Carl DeRaad	Chief of Psychiatry	1999–2001, 2003
Alan Alda	Dr. Gabriel "Gabe" Lawrence	ER Attending Physician	1999
Elizabeth Mitchell	Dr. Kim Legaspi	Psychiatrist	2000–2001
Lourdes Benedicto	Rena Trujillo	Pediatrics auxiliary	2001
Eddie Shin	Stanley Mao	Medical Student	2001
Christopher Grove	Dr. Marty Kline	Orthopedic Surgeon	2002–2003, 2006
Leslie Bibb	Erin Harkins	Medical Student	2002–2003
Don Cheadle	Paul Nathan	Medical Student	2002
Bruno Campos	Dr. Eddie Dorset	Vascular Surgeon	2003
Glenn Howerton	Dr. Nick "Coop" Cooper	ER Resident	2003
Nicholas D'Agosto	Andy	Medical Student	2003
Shi Ne Nielson	Sheila	Medical Student	2003–2004
Rossif Sutherland	Lester Kertzenstein	Medical Student	2003–2004
L. Scott Caldwell	Dr. Megan Rabb	Director of Neonatology	2004, 2006
Jeremy Glazer	David	Medical Student	2004
Paul Blackthorne	Dr. Jeremy Lawson	Interventional Radiologist	2004
Maury Sterling	Dr. Nelson	Psychiatrist	2004, 2006
Andy Powers	Dr. Howard Ritzke	ER Intern	2004
Jillian Bach	Penny Nicholson	Medical Student	2004–2006
Leland Orser	Dr. Lucien Dubenko	Surgical Attending, Chief of Surgery	2004–2009
Giovannie Pico	Ludlow	Medical Student	2004–2005
Sara Gilbert	Dr. Jane Figler	ER Intern/Resident	2004–2008
Eion Bailey	Jake Scanlon	Medical Student	2004–2005
Anthony Giangrande	Dr. Jeremy Munson	ER Intern	2005
Michael Spellman	Dr. Jim Babinski	ER Intern	2005
Damali Scott	Dr. Lana Clemons	ER Intern	2005
Corey Stoll	Dr. Teddy Marsh	ER Intern	2005
John Leguizamo	Dr. Victor Clemente	ER Attending Physician	2005–2006
Kim Strauss	Dr. Ari	Anesthesiologist	2005–2007
Dahlia Salem	Dr. Jessica Albright	Surgical Chief Resident	2005–2006
J. P. Manoux	Dr. Dustin Crenshaw	Surgical Chief Resident, Surgical Attending	2006–2008
Busy Philipps	Dr. Hope Bobeck	ER Intern	2006–2007
Malaya Rivera Drew	Katey Alvaro	Medical Student	2006–2007
Gina Ravera	Dr. Bettina DeJesus	Radiologist	2006–2008
Julia Ling	Mae Lee Park	Medical Student	2006–2007
Marc Jablon	Dr. Larry Weston	ER Intern/Resident	2007–2008
Stanley Tucci	Dr. Kevin Moretti	Chief of Emergency Medicine	2007, 2008
Gil McKinney	Dr. Paul Grady	ER Intern/Resident	2007–2009
Steven Christopher Parker	Dr. Harold Zelinsky	Surgical Intern	2007–2008
Kari Matchett	Dr. Skye Wexler	Acting Chief of Emergency Medicine	2007–2008
Charles Esten	Dr. Barry Grossman	Orthopedic Surgeon	2007–2008
Anthony Starke	Dr. Craig	Orthopedic Surgeon	2008
Bresha Webb	Laverne St. John	Medical Student/ER Intern	2008–2009
Julia Jones	Kaya Montoya	Medical Student/ER Intern	2008–2009
Shiri Appleby	Dr. Daria Wade	ER Intern	2008–2009
Julian Morris	Dr. Andrew Wade	Surgical Intern	2008–2009
Victor Rasuk	Dr. Ryan Sánchez	ER Intern	2008–2009
Emily Rose	Dr. Tracy Martin	ER Intern	2008–2009
Sam Jones III	Dr. Charles "Chaz" Pratt, Jr.	ER Intern	2005–2009
Alexis Bledel	Dr. Julia Wise	ER Intern	2009

=== Firefighters, paramedics, police officers, and social workers ===
Actor/Actress	Character Name	Character Position	Years of Appearance
Rick Marzan	Camacho	Paramedic	1994–1995
Emily Wagner	Doris Pickman	Paramedic	1994–2009
Mike Genovese	Officer Al Grabarsky	Police Officer	1995–2000
Montae Russell	Dwight Zadro	Paramedic	1995–2009
Carlos Gomez	Raul Melendez	Paramedic	1995–1996
Ron Eldard	Ray "Shep" Shepard	Paramedic	1995–1996
Chad McKnight	Officer Wilson	Police Officer	1995, 1996, 1999–2000, 2001–2004, 2006
Lynn A. Henderson	Pamela Olbes	Paramedic	1995–2009
Scott Michael Campbell	Reilly Brown	EMT	1996
Brian Lester	Brian Dumar	Paramedic	1996–2009
Erica Gimpel	Adele Newman	Social Services Liaison	1997–2003
J.P. Hubbell	Lars Audia	EMT	1997–1999
Michele Morgan	Allison Beaumont	Paramedic	1997–1998
George Eads	Greg Powell	Paramedic	1997–1998
Ed Lauter	Captain Dannaker	Firefighter	1998–2002
Demetrius Navarro	Morales	Paramedic	1998–2009
Cress Williams	Officer Reggie Moore	Police Officer	1998–2000, 2008
Michelle Bonilla	Christine Harms	Paramedic	1999–2009
Joe Basile	Officer Tom Bennini	Police Officer	2000
David Roberson	Officer Durcy	Police Officer	2000–2002
Claudine Claudio	Silva	Paramedic	2000–2001
Lisa Vidal	Lieutenant Sandy Lopez	Firefighter	2001–2004
Julie Ann Emery	Niki Lumley	Paramedic	2001–2003
Daniel Dae Kim	Ken Sung	Social Worker	2003–2004
Louie Liberti	Tony Bardelli	Paramedic	2003–2009
Elliot Durant III	Anders	Paramedic	2004, 2009
Mädchen Amick	Wendall Meade	Social Worker	2004–2005
Bobby Nish	Officer Danny Yau	Police Officer	2005–2006
Tara Karsian	Liz Dade	Social Worker	2005–2006, 2007, 2008–2009
Eddie B. Smith	Officer Jones	Police Officer	2005–2008
Mary E. Kennedy	Officer Trudy Lange	Police Officer	2006
Louis Iacoviello	Officer Rovner	Police Officer	2006
Christopher Amitrano	Officer Hollis	Police Officer	2006–2009
Brendan Patrick Connor	Reidy	Paramedic	2006–2008
Vyto Ruginis	Wright	Paramedic	2006–2007
Joe Manganiello	Officer Litchman	Police Officer	2007
Sam Jones III	Charles "Chaz" Pratt, Jr.	EMT	2005–2009
Demetrius Grosse	Officer Newkirk	Police Officer	2008–2009
Justina Machado	Detective Claudia Diaz	Police Officer	2009
David Eigenberg	Detective Trent Mallory	Police Officer	2009

=== Family members ===
Key
Symbol	Meaning
‡	Another actor subsequently took over the role
†	Another actor previously held the role

Actor/Actress	Character Name	Character Position	Years of Appearance
Christine Harnos	Jennifer "Jenn" Greene	Wife of Mark Greene	1994–1998, 2001–2002
Yvonne Zima ‡	Rachel Greene	Daughter of Mark Greene and Jennifer Greene	1994–2000
Georgiana Tarjan ‡	Helen Hathaway	Mother of Carol Hathaway	1994–1995
Ving Rhames	Walt Robbins	Brother-in-law of Peter Benton	1994–1996
Kathleen Wilhoite	Chloe Lewis	Sister of Susan Lewis	1994–1996, 2002
Beah Richards	Mae Benton	Mother of Peter Benton	1995–2001
Mike Genovese	Al Grabarsky	Boyfriend of Lydia Wright	1995–2000
Khandi Alexander	Jackie Robbins	Sister of Peter Benton	1995–2001
Christopher Richardson ‡	Jesse Robbins	Nephew of Peter Benton	1995
Tamala Jones	Joanie Robbins	Niece of Peter Benton	1995
Mark Dakota Robinson	Steven Robbins	Nephew of Peter Benton	1995
Wolfgang Bodison ‡	Al Boulet	Husband of Jeanie Boulet	1995
Valerie Perrine	Irene "Cookie" Lewis	Mother of Susan Lewis	1995
Michael Beach †	Al Boulet	Husband of Jeanie Boulet	1995–1997
Paul Dooley	Henry Lewis	Father of Susan Lewis	1995–1996, 2004
Piper Laurie	Sarah Ross	Mother of Doug Ross	1995–1996
James Farentino	Ray Ross	Father of Doug Ross	1996
Lisa Nicole Carson	Carla Reece	Mother of Reese Benton	1996–2001
John Aylward	Donald Anspaugh	Uncle of Simon Brenner	1996–2008
Rose Gregorio †	Helen Hathaway	Mother of Carol Hathaway	1996–1999
Frances Sternhagen	Millicent "Gamma" Carter	Grandmother of John Carter	1997–2003
Bonnie Bartlett	Ruth Greene	Mother of Mark Greene	1997–1998
John Cullum	David Greene	Father of Mark Greene	1997–2000
Jonathan Scarfe	Chase Carter	Cousin of John Carter	1997–1998, 2001
Trevor Morgan	Scott Anspaugh	Son of Donald Anspaugh	1998
George Plimpton	John Truman Carter, Sr.	Grandfather of John Carter	1998–2001
Taraji P. Henson	Patrice Robbins	Niece of Peter Benton	1998
Paul Freeman	Charles Corday	Father of Elizabeth Corday	1998, 2001–2002
Cress Williams	Reggie Moore	Boyfriend of Jeanie Boulet	1998–2000, 2008
Matthew Watkins	Reese Benton	Son of Peter Benton	1999–2001, 2009
Judy Parfitt	Isabelle Corday	Mother of Elizabeth Corday	2000–2002
Gwynyth Walsh	Barbara Knight	Mother of Lucy Knight	2000
Mark Valley	Richard Lockhart	Ex-husband of Abby Lockhart	2000–2003
Andrew McFarlane †	Jesse Robbins	Nephew of Peter Benton	2000
Sally Field	Maggie Wyczenski	Mother of Abby Lockhart	2000–2006
Nancy Kwan ‡	Mrs. Chen	Mother of Jing-Mei Chen	2000
Sasha Turjak	Danijela Kovač	Wife of Luka Kovač	2001
Michael Gross	John "Jack" Carter, Jr.	Father of John Carter	2001–2004
Mary McDonnell	Eleanor Carter	Mother of John Carter	2001
Hallee Hirsh †	Rachel Greene	Daughter of Mark Greene and Jennifer Greene	2001–2002, 2004, 2009
Lisa Vidal	Sandy Lopez	Girlfriend of Kerry Weaver	2001–2004
Salome Violetta Haertel ‡	Ella Greene	Daughter of Mark Greene and Elizabeth Corday	2002
Marcello Thedford	Leon	Foster brother of Greg Pratt	2002–2003
Tom Everett Scott	Eric Wyczenski	Brother of Abby Lockhart	2002–2003
George Kee Cheung ‡	Mr. Chen	Father of Jing-Mei Chen	2003–2004
Kieu Chinh †	Mrs. Chen	Mother of Jing-Mei Chen	2003
Donal Logue	Chuck Martin	Husband of Susan Lewis	2003–2005
Oliver Davis ‡	Alex Taggart	Son of Sam Taggart and Steve Curtis	2003–2005
Thandie Newton	Makemba "Kem" Likasu	Girlfriend of John Carter	2003–2005, 2009
Joy Bryant	Valerie Gallant	Sister of Michael Gallant	2003–2004
Shannon Wilcox	Connie Martin	Wife of Frank Martin	2004
Christine Young	Janie Martin	Daughter of Frank Martin and Connie Martin	2004
Cole Hauser ‡	Steve Curtis	Father of Alex Taggart	2004
Anupam Kher	Ajay Rasgotra	Father of Neela Rasgotra	2004
Kiron Kher	Mrs. Rasgotra	Mother of Neela Rasgotra	2004
Henry O †	Mr. Chen	Father of Jing-Mei Chen	2004
Frances Fisher	Helen Kingsley	Biological mother of Kerry Weaver	2005
Garret Dillahunt †	Steve Curtis	Father of Alex Taggart	2005–2006
Danny Glover	Charles "Charlie" Pratt, Sr.	Father of Greg Pratt	2005
Sam Jones III	Charles "Chaz" Pratt, Jr.	Half-brother of Greg Pratt	2005–2009
Dominic Janes †	Alex Taggart	Son of Sam Taggart and Steve Curtis	2005–2009
Tina Lifford	Evelyn Pratt	Stepmother of Greg Pratt	2005
Cecily Lewis	Jocelyn Pratt	Half-sister of Greg Pratt	2005
Ernie Hudson	James Gallant	Father of Michael Gallant	2006
Sheryl Lee Ralph	Gloria Gallant	Mother of Michael Gallant	2006
Estelle Harris	Mrs. Markovic	Mother of Jerry Markovic	2006
Paula Malcolmson	Meg Riley	Mother of Sarah Riley	2006–2007
Chloe Greenfield	Sarah Riley	Daughter of Tony Gates	2006–2009
Aidan and Andrew Gonzales	Josip "Joe" Kovač	Son of Luka Kovač and Abby Lockhart	2006–2009
Fred Ward	Eddie Wyczenski	Father of Abby Lockhart	2006–2007
Lois Smith	Gracie	Grandmother of Sam Taggart	2007
Stacy Keach	Mike Gates	Father of Tony Gates	2007
Rosalee Mayeux	Jacey Barnett	Mother of Ray Barnett	2007
Zoran Radanovich	Niko Kovač	Brother of Luka Kovač	2007
Oscar Blanco	Carlos Moore	Son of Jeanie Boulet	2008
Rebecca Hazlewood	Jaspreet	Cousin of Neela Rasgotra	2008
Courtney B. Vance	Russell Banfield	Husband of Cate Banfield	2008–2009
Ellaraino	Mary Banfield	Mother-in-law of Cate Banfield	2008
Daylon Adkison	Daryl Banfield	Son of Cate Banfield and Russell Banfield	2008
Kasey Mahaffy	Johnny Morris	Cousin of Archie Morris	2009
Shannon Woodward	Kelly Taggart	Sister of Sam Taggart	2009
Kristolyn Lloyd	Laura	Niece of Cate Banfield	2009
Amy Madigan	Mary Taggart	Mother of Sam Taggart	2009

=== Notable patients ===
Actor/Actress	Character Name	Character Position	Years of Appearance
Rosemary Clooney	Mary "Madame X" Cavanaugh	Former singer who suffers from Alzheimer's disease	1994
Kevin Michael Richardson	Patrick	Mentally disabled boy who occasionally wanders into the ER	1994
Colleen Flynn	Jodi O'Brien	Patient who died during childbirth under Dr. Mark Greene's care	1995
Mary Mara	Loretta Sweet	Sympathetic, down-and-out prostitute and single mother who has cervical cancer	1995–1996
Kirsten Dunst	Charlene "Charlie" Chiemingo	Child prostitute who was being cared for by Dr. Doug Ross	1996–1997
Sam Vlahos	Pablo	Homeless man who sought care from County's medical staff	1997–2003
David Krumholtz	Paul Sobriki	Schizophrenic patient who in a psychotic break stabbed both Dr. John Carter and Lucy Knight, the wounds leaving Carter injured and with life-long kidney problems and eventually resulted in Lucy's death	2000, 2002
James Cromwell	Bishop Lionel Stewart	Catholic bishop who helped Dr. Luka Kovač with his guilt about the death of his family	2001
Ray Liotta	Charlie Metcalf	Alcoholic ex-con who comes to the ER with a cirrhosis-related illnesses	2004
Red Buttons	Jules "Ruby" Rubadoux	Patient (whose wife died after becoming part of a medical study at Dr. Carter's suggestion) with heart problems	1995–1996, 2005
James Woods	Dr. Nate Lennox	Former biochemistry professor with ALS disease	2006
Forest Whitaker	Curtis Ames	Patient who sued Dr. Kovač for malpractice after suffering from a paralyzing stroke while under his care for pneumonia	2006–2007
