= Greg Pratt =

Fictional character

Gregory Pratt
- Mekhi Phifer as Greg Pratt
- First appearance: April 4, 2002 (8x18, "Orion in the Sky")
- Last appearance: September 25, 2008 (15x01, "Life After Death")
- Portrayed by: Mekhi Phifer
- Duration: 2002–08

In-universe information
- Gender: Male
- Title(s): Intern (2002–2003); Resident (2003–2006); Attending (2006–2008)
- Occupation: Physician
- Family: Angela Watkins (mother, deceased); Charles "Charlie" Pratt Sr. (father); Charles "Chaz" Pratt Jr. (paternal half-brother); Evelyn Pratt (stepmother); Jocelyn Pratt (paternal half-sister); Leon (adopted brother)

Gregory Pratt, M.D. is a fictional character from the medical drama series ER, portrayed by Mekhi Phifer. He first appears as a recurring character towards the end of the eighth season, becoming a main character from the start of the ninth season until the start of the fifteenth season.

== Character background ==
Pratt is the son of an absentee father who appears later, played by Danny Glover.

== Storylines ==
In first appearance as a main character (in the Season 8 episode "Orion in the Sky"), Pratt was shown to be an intelligent but arrogant and cavalier intern from Chicago's Jesse Brown VA hospital. He meets Mark Greene on Greene's last day at County and is initially dismissive, but his attitude changes when he learns of Greene's terminal cancer. Pratt worked at County hospital the day of Greene's memorial to accommodate the other doctors attending Greene's memorial. Pratt later inherits Greene's locker.

At the beginning of his residency, Pratt displays decisiveness and precision. However, his limited experience, overconfidence, and sometimes questionable personal behavior draw the ire of chief resident John Carter, who on a couple of occasions compares him to another reckless doctor he had seen before (implied to be Dave Malucci). Carter and the other attending physicians clash with Pratt over his impulsive decisions, including performing a procedure he is unqualified to do (though the patient survives) and resuscitating a declared-dead patient who is then brain-dead afterward and fully dependent upon machines. He initially clashes with med student Michael Gallant who prefers strict adherence to rules and orders, whereas Pratt often circumvents rules and instructions, but they later become close friends. During a smallpox outbreak, Pratt proves his skills and courage by helping Luka Kovač and Jing-Mei Chen save Robert Romano's life. The hospital is thrown into chaos during the evacuation and he, Carter, Abby Lockhart, and Chen are forced to quarantine in the ER.

== Character arc: Seasons 9-15 ==
In Season 9, Pratt begins an off/on relationship with fellow physician, Dr. Jing-Mei "Deb" Chen. During the series, it was revealed that Pratt had a mentally disabled adopted brother named Leon living with him, a man who kept Pratt safe and focused on school during his childhood but was left with the reasoning ability of a small child after surviving a gunshot to the head. Due to his disability, Leon often got into trouble and would disrupt Pratt's professional and personal life, especially when he became involved with a group of thugs who stabbed him in the buttock over a confiscated gun, got him thrown in jail overnight, and then made him join them on a robbery that ended with one of the thugs dead and a cop badly injured. To help give Pratt a break, Carter suggested that Leon leave town for a while, leading Pratt to send his brother away to stay with other family members in Baltimore. Leon never returned to the show and was not mentioned again in future seasons. Pratt and medical student Michael Gallant were briefly held for questioning by the Chicago police after a robbery/homicide occurred at a diner across the street; Chen had said that she might have seen a black man fleeing the scene.

During the tenth season, Pratt was supposedly fired by the frustrated Dr. Romano, whom he had been bumping heads with ever since Romano took over the ER. This was based on bogus allegations that Romano was collecting because of his overall dislike of Dr. Pratt, planning to build them up until he had enough ammunition to get rid of Pratt for good. However, Romano never got to present these findings before the hospital director since he never showed up at the conference (unbeknownst to the others, he had been killed minutes earlier by a helicopter that crashed in the ambulance bay and crushed him). Dr. Anspaugh, correctly assuming that Romano was biased, told Pratt to keep up the good work.

Pratt and Chen's continuing relationship began to break down when Pratt's casual flirting with a new medical student Neela Rasgotra led to Pratt telling Chen he did not see them having a serious future together. Their relationship ended early in Season 10 and Chen was often curt and dismissive towards Pratt for a long while, but they eventually became friends again.

In Season 10's season finale "Drive", Pratt is involved in a road rage shooting while driving a recent patient, Elgin Gibbs, home en route to dinner with Dr. Chen. As Pratt tried to drive away from the shooter, his car was forced off a bridge and into the Chicago River, leading to Pratt sustaining serious head injuries, and Chen suffering a broken leg. Elgin died from his injuries. Their interactions became infrequent due to Chen's family problems, but Pratt went over to her house during Season 11's Christmas Eve episode when he learned she quit. Chen's father begged her to let him die so she injects him with a drug that kills him, and Pratt was aghast by this idea but ultimately supported Chen as she performed euthanasia, and then consoled her as she wept over the loss of her family. This ends his life and Pratt and Chen's relationship since Chen returns to China to bury her father's remains and is never heard from again.

For the Chief Resident post that came up in season 11, Pratt was backed at first by Dr. Luka Kovač and later by Dr. Susan Lewis, who had often been critical of his job performance in the past but told him she could see herself backing him for the job. However, he decided against applying for the position due to the extra workload, which was subsequently awarded to Dr. Archie Morris- who was goofy and awkward and had none of Pratt's natural leadership and communications skills.

Dr. Pratt comes to terms with his clouded past at the end of Season 11, making contact with his estranged father, Charlie Pratt (portrayed by Danny Glover). But, following on in Season 12, Pratt was unable to forgive his father for their estrangement even though proof emerged that Charlie had been forced out of Greg's life by his mom, and ended any reconciliation efforts. Later, after much counsel, Pratt restored ties with his half-brother Chaz (portrayed by Sam Jones III).

In the episode, "Strange Bed Fellows," Dr. Luka Kovač instructs Pratt to go to Darfur, Africa to join Dr. John Carter in a Doctors Without Borders program after Pratt helped a friend avoid a DUI by sending a vial of his blood for the blood alcohol test, rather than his friend's; the friend later drove drunk and nearly killed a kid. To avoid legal repercussions and also to force him to think about the actions Dr. Kovač sends him away. When Pratt challenges Kovač and says he won't go, Kovač says he has two choices: leave for Darfur or have the DUI case info released and see his medical career come to an end. Pratt eventually decides to go, allowing him to move up to the position of attending physician, which Dr. Victor Clemente could not fulfill. Pratt becomes a better doctor for going to Darfur as he gets a sense of what it means to push himself under genuinely impossible and horrifying conditions. He sincerely thanks Luka for making him go, and the two doctors are back on good terms afterward.

At the start of season 13, Pratt achieves his new title as attending, while Chaz moves in with him after Charlie abuses him and he joins Greg in cutting all ties to his rotten dad. However, later on, Pratt discovers his brother in a compromising position with another man. After much denial and a talk with Dr. Kerry Weaver Pratt begins to understand and accept his brother's homosexuality. He also supports his brother's new job as an Emergency Medical Technician but clashes with Chaz's co-workers after they encourage him to drink near-fatal amounts of alcohol.

Later in the season, Pratt discovered a church holding an illegal prescription drugs exchange program between church members. Pratt tried to reason with the pastor to seek better alternatives. With no compromise being met, he decided to take part in the program to make it safer by donating some narcotics from the ER. However, when a member of the church died as a result of the drug exchange, an investigation was conducted by police and social workers. Pratt soon admitted to his chief, Dr. Kovač, that he was solely involved in the scheme, preventing any repercussions on the department. Pratt was arrested by the police (though Kovač helped bail him out) and was put before the review board at the hospital for an explanation of his actions. Surprisingly, Pastor Watkins of First Mission Baptist and his congregation showed up on Pratt's behalf and explained the entire story of his contribution. The board subsequently dismissed Pratt from any suspension, allowing him to retain his medical license and job. Near the end of the season, Kovač asked Pratt to be the best man at his wedding and Greg said yes.

After being overlooked for the position of Chief of the ER in favor of a new attending Dr. Skye Wexler, Pratt submitted his two-week notice of resignation stating that the administration of the County General did not respect him; however, he soon changed his mind after meeting former Physician Assistant Jeanie Boulet. After this, Pratt pursued the ER Chief position and finally was able to have a serious adult relationship with the radiologist Dr. Bettina DeJesus.

At the end of the Season 14 finale, "The Chicago Way," Pratt entered an ambulance, which was transporting a patient (portrayed by Steve Buscemi), who revealed himself to be a government informant in Witness Protection. With a botched attempt made on the patient's life in the ER, the Turkish mob targeting Pratt's patient finally succeeded when they booby-trapped the ambulance Pratt rode in. A subsequent explosion resulted in a season-ending cliffhanger.

== Character death and 15th season ==
He died in the Season 15 premiere, "Life After Death," from injuries sustained in an explosion. Dr. Morris tried to save him, but failed. It was further revealed in the episode that Pratt was going to receive an offer to become the new Chief of the ER. Former doctors, such as Dr. Kerry Weaver from Florida and Dr. John Carter from Africa, sent their condolences and gifts in honor of Pratt.

In the end, Morris hands Bettina the engagement ring Pratt had intended to give her. Among the ER staff who came to memoralize him at Ike's bar were Dr. Abby Lockhart, Dr. Archie Morris, Dr. Neela Rasgotra, Dr. Tony Gates, Sam Taggart, Simon Brenner, Chuny Marquez, Haleh Adams, Malik McGrath, Frank Martin, Paramedic Dumars, and his brother Chaz, who had become a new med student about halfway through Season 15.

During the 15th and final season of ER, at the end of the episode "The Book of Abby," long-serving nurse Haleh Adams shows the departing Dr. Abby Lockhart a closet wall where all the past doctors and employees have put their locker name tags. Amongst them, the tag "Pratt" can be seen.
