= Jing-Mei Chen =

- Ming-Na Wen as Jing-Mei Chen
- First appearance: January 12, 1995 (1x13, "Luck of the Draw")
- Last appearance: December 9, 2004 (11x09, "Twas the Night")
- Portrayed by: Ming-Na Wen
- Duration: 1995, 2000–04

In-universe information
- Nickname: Deb
- Title(s): Medical Student (1995); Resident (2000–01); Chief Resident (2001); Attending (2002–04)
- Occupation: Physician
- Family: Mr. Chen (father, deceased); Mrs Chen (mother, deceased)
- Children: Michael Alexander (placed for adoption)
- Relatives: Other relatives living in China (mentioned)

Jing-Mei Chen, M.D. is a fictional character from the medical drama series ER, portrayed by Ming-Na Wen. The character first appears in the first season as a recurring guest character, going by the name Debra "Deb" Chen. She departs the series towards the end of the first season, before returning as a main cast member part way through the sixth season, remaining until the middle of the eleventh season.

== Season 1 and early life at County ==
She arrives at County General in the middle of season one as an eager young medical student ready to learn, only to quit near the end of the season after almost killing a man as she tries to insert a central line into his chest. She decides that she is better suited to medical research than working directly with patients. She leaves County and does not continue her medical training.

She is revealed to have been very wealthy (although not as wealthy as John Carter): both of her parents were doctors, and her mother chief of surgery at another hospital. In her first appearance, she is intimidated by John because he arrived earlier and supposedly wiser and more skilled, but this was quickly dispelled when it was shown that he was the source of pranking and joke-making for most of the ER staff. With the encouragement of Nurse Haleh Adams, she plays a prank on John.

== Season 6 ==
She returns to County General in the Season 6 episode "Family Matters" as a third year resident, after her wealthy parents bought her way back into County with a large donation to the hospital. Upon her return she expresses a preference for being called by her Chinese name, "Jing-Mei", although John Carter continues to affectionately call her "Deb". She and Carter resume their friendship despite not having seen or spoken with each other in 5 years. In this episode, it is revealed that four months after she quit, she was inspired to return to medicine after saving a man's life on a subway. She then realized that she had a talent for medicine, and her erstwhile rival John Carter was happy to see her back. They continue their rivalry for a while before finally learning how to work with each other. Chen also supported Carter as he recovered from the same near-fatal stabbing that had led to the death of talented medical student Lucy Knight, and was part of the group who confronted him about his drug addiction and successfully convinced him to attend a rehab facility in Atlanta. During this season she showed signs of being attracted to Dr. Dave Malucci. He reciprocated, and the possibility of a romance was briefly explored. However, this changed with the introduction of a male ICU Nurse introduced later in the season as another possible romantic interest.

== Season 7 ==
In Season 7, Jing-Mei reveals to Dr. Kerry Weaver that she is pregnant with Nurse Frank Bacon's child, when Kerry informs her that she is a candidate for Chief Resident next year. She gives birth to a baby boy on Christmas Eve, accompanied by her longtime friend John Carter. After considering the challenges of being a doctor and a single mother, and also realizing she would not get much support from her family because her son is biracial, she subsequently places the child for adoption. At the end of the season, both she and Carter apply for Chief Resident, but her application is declined due to her time off for maternity leave. She appeals the decision and is promoted to Chief Resident in Season 8. During this season it was shown that her attraction to Dave Malucci had disappeared and in fact, their relationship had turned somewhat adversarial.

== Season 8 ==
During the early part of Season 8, Jing-Mei is having a hard time as an authority figure in the ER. Weaver is pressuring her about being indecisive. In the episode "The Longer You Stay", Jing-Mei and Dr. Dave Malucci make a hasty decision to perform a procedure before checking all necessary tests, ultimately leading to the death of a patient who is later found to have symptoms associated with Marfan syndrome.

Because of this mistake, and her history as a medical student, the Risk Management staff, Dr. Robert Romano and Dr. Weaver agree to have her resign as Chief Resident; in addition, Weaver fires Malucci. The board determines that because of her maternity leave, she did not have Attending status at the time of the incident and was therefore not authorized to make the decision for the procedure. Weaver, the Attending on shift, was off campus at the time and did not answer her pages, meaning that the procedure was unauthorized. As a result, Jing-Mei quits.

After the holidays, Jing-Mei returns to County to speak to Romano about getting her job back. She claims to have evidence that Weaver was not wearing her pager at the time of the incident and had, in fact, left it in a restaurant bathroom. In order to stave off lawsuits and accusations of professional negligence on Weaver's part, the hospital re-hires Jing-Mei as a full-time Attending, much to Weaver's dismay. Their relationship afterward is awkward at best, but reaches an accord after both parties impress the other with their professionalism and the need to work as comrades while under pressure from County's chaotic environment.

At the end of Season 8, Jing-Mei begins working with the new Dr. Greg Pratt, who constantly flirts with her, to a mix of condescension and amusement. They are forced to work with each other when the ER is locked down due to a supposed smallpox outbreak.

== Season 9 ==
In the season premiere episode of Season 9, while under quarantine for smallpox which was actually revealed to be monkeypox, she and Abby Lockhart, John Carter, Gregory Pratt, and a homeless patient spend two weeks socializing at a shut-down Chicago County General. In this season, Jing-Mei and Pratt start a relationship, which is mostly marked by a lot of arguments (most of them initiated by Chen) and some occasional sex. During season 9, she strikes a closer friendship with both Susan Lewis and Abby Lockhart who are seen hanging out more often.

== Season 10 ==
In season 10, Jing-Mei and Greg Pratt break up very early in the season when it becomes clear she doesn't particularly like him and he has no interest in "proving himself" to her. She later flies to China, where her mother died in a car accident, leaving her to care for her ailing father. In succeeding episodes, she is seen struggling with her father's increasing emotional instability and violent outbursts. At one point Chen's father hits her, inflicting a black eye. While she and Greg's post-breakup ties are strained (in one episode, Jing-Mei tells Sam Taggart she regrets that she missed out on a possible relationship with Luka Kovac and went in "another direction", and later on she pointedly assigns interesting parts of a complex case to a resident who is less experienced and qualified than Pratt, who knows exactly what she's doing but takes it in stride), by the season finale, Chen and Pratt have gotten back on decent terms with each other to the point where she is in a car with Pratt driving and his patient Elgin sitting in the back. Pratt angers another driver, who opens fire on their car. In the midst of the chaos the episode fades to black.

== Season 11 and departure ==
While trying to avoid the shooting, the car spins out of control and crashes into the Chicago River, with Jing-Mei shot in the leg and Elgin shot in the neck. Jing-Mei and Greg Pratt require major surgery, and Elgin dies while receiving emergency care.

Later in Season 11, an overwhelmed Jing-Mei quits County after Dr. Susan Lewis, the newly appointed chief of emergency medicine, refuses her request for leave to care for her father on Christmas Eve. Dr. Pratt discovers that Chen's father is constantly asking for her to help him commit suicide and in her bewildered state she considers listening to her father's wishes and giving him a lethal dose of potassium or Ativan to kill him. She eventually fulfills this wish and when she does so, he almost immediately dies. Pratt covers for her by telling the paramedics that Chen's father had died in his sleep. Chen returns to China to bury her father and lets Greg know she has no plans to return to the U.S. anytime soon. Chen did not return to the series after this, and was never mentioned again by any of the other characters.

== Season 15 ==
During the 15th and final season of ER, at the end of the episode The Book of Abby, long-serving nurse Haleh Adams shows the departing Abby Lockhart a closet wall where all the past doctors and employees have put their locker name tags. Amongst them, the tag "Chen" can be seen.

Other offices
Preceded by Kerry Weaver (1995–1996)	Chief Resident; 2001	Succeeded by John Carter
