= Neela Rasgotra =

- Parminder Nagra as Neela Rasgotra
- First appearance: September 25, 2003 (Season 10, "Now What?")
- Last appearance: April 2, 2009 (Season 15, "And In the End...")
- Portrayed by: Parminder Nagra

In-universe information
- Gender: Female
- Title(s): Medical Student (2003–2004); ER Intern (2004–2005); ER Resident Physician (2005–2006); Surgical Intern (2006); Surgical Resident Physician (2006–2009)
- Occupation: General Surgeon and Emergency Medicine Physician
- Spouses: Michael Gallant (husband; deceased); Tony Gates (ex-boyfriend); Simon Brenner (ex-boyfriend); Ray Barnett (boyfriend)
- Relatives: Parents, several brothers and sisters. Jaspreet (cousin)
- Origin: London, England

Dr. Neela Rasgotra (former married name Gallant) is a fictional character portrayed by Parminder Nagra on the television show ER. Following the departures of Goran Visnjic, Maura Tierney, and Mekhi Phifer, Nagra was left as the longest term cast member on ER. Parminder Nagra's addition into the main cast opening credits was in the 3rd episode of season 10. The character was listed in Wetpaint's "10 Hottest Female Doctors on TV" and in BuzzFeed's "16 Hottest Doctors On Television".

== Beginnings ==
Neela Kaur Rasgotra first appeared in late 2003 at the start of the 10th season as a talented but very reticent medical student from Southall, London, of Punjabi Sikh heritage.

She arrives on her first day as the ER is undergoing major renovations and is for the most part unnoticed, except by Dr. Michael Gallant, who guides her through the rough start in the hospital, and Dr. Greg Pratt, who flirts a little bit with her. Neela is very intelligent but sometimes stumbles in her doctor–patient communications skills. This proves disastrous when she informs the wrong woman of her grandson's death.

A very reserved individual, she faces her first big crisis at County when a helicopter crash occurs on Thanksgiving Day, killing Dr. Robert Romano and pushing her and everyone else there to their limits. Nevertheless, she does her job superbly. It is also revealed that Neela had a terrible case of claustrophobia, which she later conquers by braving a hyperbaric chamber session that helped save a baby's life from carbon monoxide poisoning.

At the end of Season 10, Neela and Abby Lockhart both graduate from medical school. However, upon graduating, Neela has an identity crisis and turns down an internship at the University of Michigan, opting to work as a store clerk when no other position turns up.

After a few episodes, she asks the ER chief Dr. Kerry Weaver for a job back at County. Later, she finds herself back in the hospital after an obsessive-compulsive intern (Howard, portrayed by Andy Powers) quit and Susan Lewis makes her a job offer, which she accepts.

Neela's birthday is April 17, 1977.

== Personal life ==
She becomes close to Dr. Michael Gallant prior to his deployment to Iraq, especially after he took the blame of a patient's accidental death, sparing Neela's probable dismissal. During one return visit, they begin a romantic relationship, after which they maintain a regular correspondence. On completion of his tour of duty, they impulsively marry, but he soon feels compelled to return to Iraq and re-enlists. At this point, Neela was also struggling with her feelings for roommate Ray Barnett, who began to fall in love with her. Neela kept her distance from Ray when she decided to move in with Abby Lockhart instead. Abby and Neela remain best friends through the series; during medical school, Neela would help Abby study and Abby would help Neela with her communication problems.

In "The Gallant Hero & The Tragic Victor", Neela becomes a widow when Gallant is killed by a roadside bomb near Mosul. She pushes Ray and everyone else away when they try to offer her some comfort. In "Twenty-One Guns" (the 12th season finale), Michael's funeral takes place, where she is accompanied by Gregory Pratt. She gets angry at Michael's father, accusing him of telling Michael to go off to war when he could have stopped him, but Pratt offers her some comfort when he says that Gallant felt he had to be in Iraq, and that Pratt now understands this due to his own experiences in Darfur. Pratt later receives a phone call from the ER; both are unaware of the shootings which have taken place there.

In "Bloodline", Neela and Pratt rush to the hospital when they find out about the shooting and help the distraught ER. Neela, then taking a surgical elective, scrubs in and operates on Jerry, who eventually recovers from his injuries. Neela reunites with paramedic Tony Gates (from "Two Ships", season 12). Still mourning her husband, she gets drunk and kisses him but she apologizes to him later on. Many feelings and tension arise between her, Gates and Barnett in an uncomfortable love triangle. Chief of Surgery Dr. Dubenko has always been fond of Neela and her talents, looking out for her and helping her get the spot in a surgical elective. She later decides to leave the ER and start over as a surgical intern. As she begins her new surgical rotation, she falls under the strict supervision of new surgical Chief Resident Dr. Dustin Crenshaw, who seems to hold her back from demonstrating her skills. Later in her elective, Neela feels pushed away and neglected from her mentor when a new med student steals all the spotlight in front of Dr. Dubenko. She later discovers that Dr. Dubenko holds feelings for her as does the (female) new med student.

Neela in 2007

During the wedding of Abby and Luka, Neela decides to end her romantic relationships with Tony and Ray for good, after built-up emotions escalate and lead to a bar fight between the guys that exposed their personal issues in front of the entire ER staff. The fight got Ray tossed out of the reception party, however Neela appeared to be in the process of settling with Ray. She called him on his cell after looking affectionately at the CD of love songs he burned for her. Initially Ray, while leaving drunk from a bar, did not answer his cell despite its vibrating. She was still upset at Ray, as well as Tony, but grew concerned when Ray wouldn't answer his calls and did not show up at work. Neela went by his apartment with no luck and later discovered he was hit by a truck and was hospitalized. With both legs amputated, a bitter Ray could not forgive Neela for hurting him and left Chicago to be cared for by his mother back home, and Ray's love interest Katey blamed Neela for Ray's injuries. This further upsets Neela who has been torn apart by the two men. In the 13th season finale, Neela attends an anti-war rally and soon finds herself in danger as a mass panic ensues in the crowd. Tony who was looking for her tries to come to her aid as the crowd tramples her.

In the early part of season 14, she recovers from her accident and stays with Abby while Luka is away in Croatia. She also babysits Joe while Abby is at work. When Neela returns to work, Gates inquires about Ray and we learn that Ray has been writing to Neela. Katey and Neela have another altercation when Katey argues with Neela's directions during a trauma, but Katey ends up looking stupid as Neela's decisions save the patient's life. Neela then tells Katey she's finished taking Katey's anger about Ray's accident and Neela tells her that she will not take the blame for what happened to Ray because "I didn't make him get piss-drunk and wander in front of a truck". She also reveals that Ray himself doesn't blame her for the accident. Some months later, Neela and Abby engage in an argument after Neela finds out that Abby is an alcoholic. During the heated exchange, Abby says that Neela should not be lecturing her on love because Ray is probably wishing he never met Neela. While Neela does not directly address her feelings about Ray, from the hurt on her face it is evident that she is still not completely over what happened to him. Neela gets very upset after Abby's comments and kicks her out of the apartment. Abby and Neela make up some time later after Abby returns from rehab.

After doing an orthopedic surgery rotation where it became obvious all the surgical departments wanted her on their teams for the long haul, she returns to working for Dr. Dubenko. However, Neela has faced some professional and personal setbacks since that return: a wiz-kid surgical resident decided surgery wasn't for him and left for Pediatrics despite her efforts to convince him he could be a successful surgeon; she noted her sparse personal life on her birthday (which nobody but Tony Gates remembered); and she became close to a patient played by Aida Turturro who developed an infection that led to her death, sending Neela into the doldrums once again.

== Season 15 ==
With Abby's departure, Neela is the lead character of the final season.

In the Season 15 episode, "The Book of Abby," Neela's long-time friend and colleague, Abby Lockhart, resigned and left the ER for a new job in Boston. Neela, while happy for her friend's new start, told Abby that she wished she had known about this sooner and that she couldn't imagine working in the hospital without Abby. Separated by a glass window while operating in the OR, Neela told a departing Abby to "be good," after which Abby smiled and walked away.

Abby's departure leaves Neela Rasgotra as the most senior regular character on ER, followed by Archie Morris and Sam Taggart, respectively.

Into Season 15, Ray Barnett re-entered Neela's life just at the right time. After the death of her friend Greg Pratt and the departure of her best friend Abby a few weeks later, Ray returns right "when she needs that friend and possibly that romance back." Ray surprises Neela by showing up to County in a Frankenstein outfit during Halloween and revealed on his one-day return to Chicago that he has endured months of rehab, during which he was fitted with new cutting edge prosthetics and is walking on his own. His presence clearly has a huge impact on Neela, and she invites him to spend the night with her, but he declines by saying he has finally reached a good place in his life and doesn't want to mess that up. It is later revealed that Neela had planned to visit Ray for Thanksgiving in Louisiana but canceled the trip after learning Ray had begun dating a woman from Georgia.

Neela has had a difficult time dealing with Andrew Wade, a young surgical intern who she feels is too passive to be a successful surgeon. When a surgical patient implies she is having rectal bleeding, Andrew is too intimidated to get the information to Neela, and the patient later bleeds to death. Andrew blames himself and Neela is critical of him for not telling her the earlier information. She later tells Dr. Dubenko she doesn't want to work with Andrew anymore, and Andrew gets transferred to a less-important surgical rotation. Neela then gets mad at Andrew because she's getting sued by the dead patient's family after Andrew confessed his mistake to them. But Neela later works with Andrew on a complicated procedure that saves a patient's eye, and when she is grudging about having to teach Andrew, Dr. Dubenko angrily tells her that if that's her attitude then she needs to pack her stuff up and leave County. Chastened, Neela later tells Andrew he did a great job and that she understands his motives in talking to the patient's family. The lawsuit is later dropped and Neela reconciles herself to having a work-only relationship with the close-knit group of interns.

Later in Season 15 in "Dream Runner" she has a chance to catch up with her old colleague Dr. Elizabeth Corday during an attending interview and became involved romantically with Simon Brenner after he returned from Australia. However, in the episode 'Love is a Battlefield,' Brenner is again shown coming home from Australia, signaling to the audience that Neela's involvement with Brenner in the previous episode was just part of the re-occurring dream she was having throughout the show.

In “Love is a Battlefield,” Neela is seen skillfully avoiding Simon Brenner, brushing him off in obvious awkwardness, due to her dreams of him in the prior episode, as he tells her that he called her the second he got back in from Australia to go out to dinner and catch up, even telling her that he had a gift for her. At the end of the episode, she runs away from him, only to have him catch up to her on the busy sidewalk. She admits to him that she likes him and she wants to be with him, and then telling him that he can "gloat now" – throwing back to his speech in episode "Parental Guidance" where he says that "he predicted it." He smiles and kisses her, saying that he'd 'rather do something else,' obviously showing the beginning of their relationship.

In "The Family Man," Neela is in a pre-coital position with Simon in her apartment while her phone rings. He urges her not to take it, but she does, and finds that Duke wants her to meet with the Head of Surgery. Though she claimed that she only met with Duke to ‘get Dubenko off her case,’ she is now seriously considering taking them up on their offer. Simon is obviously disappointed, but acts happy for her.

During the Valentine’s episode of the Season, "The Beginning of the End," Simon and Neela are revealing their most romantic Valentine’s celebrations: Her most romantic one was at fifteen and her boyfriend bought her a plastic tiara, and took her out, telling her that she deserved to be treated like a queen. Simon agrees fully. He suggests that they take a trip together. While at the hospital, she receives a CD in the mail from her old flame, Ray Barnett; it holds a poignant love song by Pete Yorn. She sees her old attending, John Carter who notes that the "grasshopper is now the teacher." Later in the episode she is left a map with a heart-stickered destination on it from Simon Brenner. She shows up at a balcony overlooking the Chicago River. She sees him down below and he runs up to her, calling out in Italian. He reaches her and hands her Italy pamphlets, telling her that they are at the closest thing to a canal right now, but it will change. Simon tells her that he wants them to take a week off in April and take her to Venice. She smiles and says that it definitely constitutes as a romantic gesture. He responds saying that that was nothing and it was just the beginning, surely foreshadowing things to come. They enjoy the moment with each other, leading to her new favorite Valentine’s celebration.

Neela learns from Morris about Simon's childhood and is upset he never mentioned it to her. In recent weeks Simon hasn't been around as much and always evades questions about his childhood. Eventually they get into a fight and she tells him that there are better people for both of them out there. This signifies that Neela has broken up with Simon.

During a trip to Seattle to deliver some donated organs, Neela and Sam briefly meet Carol Hathaway and Dr. Doug Ross, learning that the pair worked at County General in the past.

Neela last appeared as a regular in episode 20 of season 15, "Shifting Equilibrium," in which she leaves County General for good after talking with Simon and Abby (via phone). She is shown arriving at Le Chatelier Medical Center in Baton Rouge, Louisiana, where she goes to a physical rehab center where Ray Barnett is shown helping patients. There, she and Ray reunite, with Neela looking like she finally felt she made the right decision after struggling with her fear of making the wrong choices in life.

In the following episode "I Feel Good" she makes a cameo appearance via webcam, calling from her new workplace with Ray. He mentions that he brought some of Neela's things from home into her office at work, signifying that they are living together.

In the series finale "And In the End...," Neela makes a cameo, again appearing on webcam at Frank's admit desk, talking to Brenner, Morris, and Carter about her new life in Baton Rouge. This time Brenner seems more comfortable with Neela's physical absence.
