= Lucy Knight =

Fictional character from NBC television series

- Kellie Martin as Lucy Knight
- First appearance: September 24, 1998. (5x01, "Day for Knight")
- Last appearance: February 17, 2000. (6x14, "All in the Family")
- Portrayed by: Kellie Martin
- Duration: 1998–2000

In-universe information
- Title: Medical Student (1998–2000); Psych Resident (Posthumous offered position) (2001)
- Occupation: Physician
- Family: Barbara Knight (mother); Mr. Knight (father)

Lucy Knight is a fictional character from the NBC television series ER, portrayed by actress Kellie Martin. The character was part of the show for the fifth and sixth seasons. When she was first introduced on ER, Dr. Doug Ross called her a "by the book" medical student. Martin's image was removed from the main cast opening credits in the 15th episode of season 6.

== Conception and creation ==
Prior to this role in ER, Martin was nicknamed "One Take Kellie". She was not used to the medical jargon her character had to say, however, and claimed that it once took 12 takes to correctly pronounce "renal vein thrombosis."

== Appearances ==
=== Season 5 ===
During season 5 Lucy is a third-year medical student. Dr. John Carter is quickly assigned as her resident while she completes her emergency room rotation. Knight and Carter vary between respectful and contentious interactions.

At the beginning of her rotation at County General, Lucy is popular with the attendings and nurses. Lucy encounters conflict with Nurse Carol Hathaway after she asks for help with an IV. Lucy, unable to start an IV asks Carol for help and does not admit to Carter that she cannot start one until they wind up in a trauma situation. Carter is furious at her for lying to him and says if she ever does so again she will be off his rotation permanently. Carter again is angry with her after a Halloween party at her med school dormitory spirals out of control and two students nearly die. Angry about work that has been thrown at him at the last minute, Carter leaves Lucy in charge of the party even though, as Resident Assistant (RA) at the dormitory, this is his responsibility. Carter blames Lucy for him losing his RA position and they fight again when Carter overrules her on a case where Lucy's judgment was correct. He then accidentally hears a recording on Lucy's Palm Pilot in which she describes his condescending treatment and is again upset.

Carter and Lucy eventually reconcile after the episode "The Good Fight" when the pair spend a day and evening searching for a little girl's father who has the same extremely rare blood type as she does. Although the pair find the father, the girl's condition remains critical and the episode does not clarify whether the blood donation came in time to help save her. During this episode, Lucy reveals to Carter that she was brought up by her mother, and that she never knew her father.

During the episode The Storm: Part 1, Lucy accidentally kicks Carter while performing a Tae Bo work-out video with a patient in an exam room; he falls and suffers a cut on his head. She later notices Carter secretly admiring her backside and the pair make out in the x-ray room after she treats his cut, but Carter quickly stops this from progressing to sex saying romantic involvement between residents and medical students is unethical. Lucy's following rotation in the psychology department goes exceptionally well, with the senior doctors there pleased with her results. This is the first time the show has a main character who starts out working in the ER but is shown to be a poor match for emergency medicine and a good match instead for a different medical field (a similar, longer path is traced starting in Season 10 for Neela Rasgotra, who is an uneven ER doctor but emerges over time as a superb surgeon).

The near-end of Season 5 reveals Lucy has been prescribed Ritalin to treat ADD since high school. Carter urges her to give up the drug and she briefly complies, however, when her performance at County begins to suffer she resumes taking it. When Carter finds out and chides her she bluntly says that she does not expect him to understand or care, since "it's clear I've never lived up to your expectations."

=== Season 6 ===
Lucy's role in the early episodes of season 6 is smaller than season 5 with minor sub plots, such as helping a young artist who is abusing cocaine and urging Dr. Dave Malucci to come forward and admit he may have caused an explosion in the ER by possibly forgetting to turn off a bunsen burner.

Lucy clashes with nurse Carol Hathaway when they both make a plea for the last bed in a rehab clinic. The bed ultimately goes to Hathaway's patient, which creates renewed friction between the pair when the patient does not show up for treatment. Lucy also clashes with Dr. Cleo Finch when Finch undermines Lucy's judgment in regard to a young boy and his mother who both have alcohol abuse problems.

Lucy shows her potential in the Christmas episode "How the Finch Stole Christmas" when patient Valerie Paige comes to the ER in desperate need of a heart transplant. Lucy goes above and beyond to ensure Valerie receives a life-saving procedure - even going so far as to wake Dr. Robert Romano, the only surgeon qualified to perform the surgery required, at his house in the middle of the night on Christmas Eve. Though initially angry with her, Romano agrees to perform the operation after Lucy berates him for his seemingly flippant attitude towards the dying patient. Romano seems to gain respect and some fondness for her and even allows her to assist in the complex surgery.

Later in the episode "The Domino Heart", Lucy is devastated when Valerie dies from complications after another surgery. This makes her ponder her time at County General and prompts her to give a moving speech to Dr. Luka Kovac about it: "It's never been very easy for me to be here, sometimes I felt like I would never fit in. But at the beginning of every day I have been grateful that I'm walking in here of my own choosing and not being carried in here on some gurney and at the end of every day if I have helped just one person, it's been worth it. And that didn't happen today and it makes me sad...". Kovac reminds her that her day is not yet over and that she may still help that one person. At that moment another patient arrives near the ambulance bay, and Kovac asks her to assist. The episode ends with the two of them rushing the patient into the ER and Kovac teaching Lucy procedures and asking her questions.

==== Death ====
Kellie Martin stated that her sister's death from lupus negatively affected her comfort with appearing in a medical show, so when the show runner approached her about her character's death she was relieved. Over the course of two episodes, "Be Still My Heart" and "All In The Family", Paul Sobriki (played by David Krumholtz), a man with schizophrenia, checks into the emergency room. Lucy picks up on his mental problems, but Carter refuses to help her with the case and is dismissive of her accurate views of Paul's state. When she requests his help with calling the Psychology Department to evaluate Paul, Carter refuses and is again dismissive, leading her to retort "Just forget it, Carter!".

While in a delusional state, Paul acquires a knife intended to cut a Valentine's Day cake and stabs Lucy multiple times before hiding behind the door. When Carter enters the room and sees a Valentine for Lucy on the floor, he picks it up and smiles just as Paul emerges from the shadows, stabs him twice and flees. Carter goes into shock and falls to the floor, then notices Lucy lying in a pool of blood on the other side of the gurney. Both lose consciousness.

Both are finally found by Dr. Kerry Weaver and immediately taken to the main trauma rooms to be treated. They discover that Lucy has received four serious stab wounds to her internal organs, lung, and neck. Although Weaver and Dr. Elizabeth Corday are able to stabilize Lucy in the ER, and Corday and Dr. Robert Romano are then able to repair her tissue damage, she soon develops complications, including a pulmonary embolism. Despite the continued efforts of Drs. Corday and Romano, Lucy dies in the catheter lab awaiting a Greenfield filter. Romano in particular is upset by this and hurls a tray of tools at the wall in frustration.

Lucy's memorial service takes place in the episode "Be Patient", although it is not seen on-screen and is apparently only attended by Jing-Mei Chen, who is there more as a representative of the ER than as a friend of Lucy's. That same day, Lucy's mother, Barbara Knight, arrives to clear out her locker. She eventually seeks Carter out and they spend the afternoon talking, with Mrs. Knight recounting how Lucy loved San Francisco but went to Chicago to practice medicine before she begins sobbing over her daughter's death as Carter watches silently and sadly. Hoping to spare her the knowledge of Lucy's suffering, he lies and says he did not actually feel pain when stabbed. Carter later talks to a few characters and says Lucy was a better doctor than he gave her credit for. He also says in the Season 6 finale "May Day" that Lucy's death is "partly my fault".

In the episode "A Match Made In Heaven", a letter for Lucy arrives from a med school because she wasn't taken off their registry after she was killed. She matched to County, and, had she lived, would have been given a position as a psych resident.
