= Catherine Banfield =

Cate Banfield
- Angela Bassett as Catherine Banfield
- First appearance: October 9, 2008 (15x02, "Another Thursday at County")
- Last appearance: April 2, 2009 (15x22, "And In the End...")
- Portrayed by: Angela Bassett
- Duration: 2008–09

In-universe information
- Nickname: Cate
- Gender: Female
- Title: Chief of Emergency Medicine (2008–2009)
- Occupation: ER Attending physician
- Spouse: Russell Banfield (husband)
- Children: Daryl Banfield (son; deceased); Unnamed Son (adopted)

Catherine "Cate" Banfield is a fictional character in the American medical drama ER, portrayed by Angela Bassett. She is an attending physician with a mysterious past involving County General. Bassett's addition into the main cast opening credits was in the 2nd episode of season 15.

== Start at County ==
Banfield was hired in 2008 to become the permanent Chief of the Emergency Department, replacing Dr. Skye Wexler who was serving as acting chief. The board had decided to offer the permanent position to Dr. Gregory Pratt, but with Pratt's death, Banfield was brought in as his replacement. She first appeared in the second episode of Season 15 and immediately puts the whole ER on edge with her tough attitude. It was mentioned that she flew to Indonesia to help that country deal with the 2004 tsunami disaster. On her first day, Nurse Haleh mentioned Banfield looked familiar as if she's been at County before, which Banfield immediately denies. Her first day as Chief tested her skills as an able and efficient leader when a bio-terrorist released a bag of weaponized Ricin in the ER, necessitating an evacuation and quarantine. She briefly met and clashed over a gunshot case with Abby Lockhart, who was finishing her last shift on her last day at County General. Nonetheless, Banfield made amends with her new acquaintance before Abby departed for Boston.

In the episode "Heal Thyself", the treatment of a little girl who almost drowned in the Chicago River triggered painful memories, yet in the end it helped Banfield figure out how to save the girl from a certain death, thereby in her mind redeeming herself from the mistakes she made with her son Darryl.

Later in Season 15, Cate and Archie Morris get snowed in at a conference in Omaha. Banfield ends up getting drunk and makes a wild scene of entertainment in the hotel lobby. She smiles and actually laughs for the first time (probably the first time since before the accident). The two end up having to share a room together before flying back to Chicago. Cate begins to open up more to Morris how she and her husband tried to have another baby a few years back but miscarried.

== Prior to County ==
In the Season 15 episode "Heal Thyself", the audience begins to learn about Cate Banfield's haunting past and how her experiences have damaged her emotionally. Set in 2002, 6 years earlier, the flashback episode revealed a happier Cate Banfield with her husband Russell (played by Bassett's real life husband, actor Courtney B. Vance) and their 5-year-old son Darryl. Banfield had a more youthful look with longer black hair. She is smiling, which was never seen by the show's audiences until this point. In this episode, she stated to Dr. Greene that she worked as an ER attending physician at the University of Chicago. She went to medical school at Johns Hopkins School of Medicine.

During a day out in the city park, Darryl was struck with a mysterious seizure. Cate at first didn't see it as anything serious and argued against calling 9-1-1, even though her husband Russell insisted. After Darryl began vomiting blood, Cate brought him to County General and was diagnosed by Dr. Mark Greene in Trauma 1. Darryl had acute leukemia, and died from advanced complications that arose with his illness. Cate's initial denial and delay contributed to one of the factors that led to Dr. Greene not being able to save Darryl. This explains how Nurse Haleh had recognized her before and the chilling moment Banfield had on her first day stepping into Trauma 1. In the last scene of the episode, Banfield and Greene talk about what happened near the Chicago River and how the ordeal proved to be completely damaging in Cate's mind and to her relationship with her husband.

== After Joining County ==
In the present day in the episode "Heal Thyself" after Darryl's death, Cate lay in Darryl's empty room, where her husband Russell tells her how he never blamed her for what happened, and Cate cries for the first time over her son's death. Morris is stunned to learn that Cate is working at the hospital where her son died. Later in the season Cate has an appointment with Janet Coburn from O.B. since she and Russell decide they want to try for a baby one last time, even though Coburn tells them the chances are slim. Cate begins to take special injections of hormones to help with her chances in the process and tries to remain hopeful over all the odds, but she and Russell are devastated when the egg implantation process has zero success. Later in the season a mother abandons a baby at County with whom Cate bonds. She convinces Russell that they should adopt the baby. When in the penultimate episode the mother arrives to take him back, Cate successfully convinces her to let her and Russell openly adopt the child.

| Preceded by Skye Wexler | Chief of Emergency Medicine; 2008–2009 | Succeeded by End of series |
