= Cleo Finch =

- Michael Michele as Cleo Finch
- First appearance: September 30, 1999 (Season 6, "Leave It to Weaver")
- Last appearance: May 9, 2002 (Season 8, "On the Beach")
- Portrayed by: Michael Michele
- Duration: 1999–2001, 2002

In-universe information
- Title: Pediatric Fellow (1999–2001)
- Occupation: Physician
- Spouse: Peter Benton (husband)
- Children: Reese Benton (stepson)

Cleo Finch is a fictional character from the NBC television series ER. She was portrayed by Michael Michele and appeared on the show from the sixth season's episode, "Leave It to Weaver," which aired on September 30, 1999, until the eighth-season episode, "I'll Be Home for Christmas," which aired on December 13, 2001. Michele also made a guest appearance in the episode "On the Beach," aired on May 9, 2002.

== Character background ==
Dr. Cleo Finch made her debut at the start of Season 6 as a skilled new pediatric fellow at County General Hospital. She was depicted as a dedicated and straightforward physician who was committed to her work. Dr. Finch assumed many of the pediatric storylines left vacant by the departures of George Clooney and Maria Bello, who played pediatric doctors Doug Ross and Anna Del Amico, respectively. Her character demonstrated competence in facing challenges.

== Notable storylines ==
- In Season 6, Dr. Finch encountered difficulties, such as a distracting young patient whose iron poisoning went undiagnosed and led to death. Later on, in “How The Finch Stole Christmas," Cleo separated a young alcoholic patient from his alcoholic mother who fed his addiction during Christmas time. She also performed a critical laparotomy on a dying patient in the aftermath of a stabbing in the ER, and performed an emergency thoracotomy in the OR to stabilize the patient until a surgeon could be found.
- Dr. Peter Benton, her boyfriend at the time, initially reprimanded her for her action in the OR. He later apologized, understanding the emotional toll it took on her, especially in light of the tragic fate of another colleague Lucy Knight. He blamed the stress of performing surgery on his friend, Dr. John Carter, a victim of the stabbing. She seemed vaguely annoyed that Dr. Carter was welcomed back to County after he went to rehab for his prescription medication addiction between Seasons 6 and 7, and briefly became angered by some issues she felt were racially tinged in Season 7, but neither storyline was maintained for very long.
- Cleo's relationships and interactions with other characters, including her partnership with Peter Benton and her clashes with Peter's ex Carla, were central to her character development.

== Relationships ==
Cleo's relationships and interactions with other characters, including her partnership with Peter Benton and her clashes with Peter's ex (Carla) were central to her character development. She got along well with Peter's deaf son Reese, impressing Peter with her knowledge of ASL. Cleo often clashed with Reese's mother Carla, who saw Cleo as interfering in her family's decisions and also made an unsuccessful attempt to seduce Peter. While under Cleo's care, Reese accidentally injured his hand on a piano, leading Carla to claim she was untrustworthy and irresponsible. Cleo's relationship with Peter was also put under strain when Peter felt that Cleo's bi-racial background prevented her from understanding the medical and cultural needs of the African-American community. Despite their problems, Cleo and Peter stayed together, allowing Cleo to help Peter through a difficult child-custody battle with Roger, Carla's husband, following Carla's death. Cleo took the stand to testify that she hoped to play an important role in both Peter and Reese's lives.

== Departure ==
In Season 8, Cleo left County General Hospital for a job at a private hospital near Chicago. After winning his custody battle over Reese, Peter also departed the ER to work at the same hospital as Cleo. Their final appearance as regular characters were in the episode “I’ll be Home for Christmas,” in which they are shown helping Reese decorate a Christmas Tree.

== Later appearances ==
Michael Michele reprised her role as Dr. Finch in the Season 8 episode "On the Beach," at Mark Greene’s funeral, along with Eriq La Salle. In the 15th and final season of ER, at the end of the episode "The Book of Abby", long-serving nurse Haleh Adams shows the departing Abby Lockhart a closet wall where all the past doctors and employees have put their locker name tags. Amongst them, the tag "Finch" can be seen.

Later appearances by Dr. Benton in Season 15 suggested that Cleo and Peter had gotten married and were raising Reese together. Michele did not appear in any of those episodes.
