= Tony Gates =

Fictional character on the television series ER

- John Stamos as Tony Gates
- First appearance: "The Human Shield"; November 10, 2005
- Last appearance: "And In the End..."; April 2, 2009
- Portrayed by: John Stamos
- Duration: 2005, 2006–09

In-universe information
- Full name: Anthony Gates
- Gender: Male
- Title(s): Intern (2006–2007); Resident (2007–2009)
- Occupation: Physician, formerly Paramedic
- Family: Mike Gates (father)
- Children: Sarah Riley (adopted); Alex Taggart (stepson)

Dr. Anthony Gates is a fictional character on the television series ER portrayed by actor John Stamos. Dr. Gates was first introduced in Season 12 before becoming a series regular in Seasons 13–15.

== Paramedic appearances ==
In Dr. Gates' first appearance in the series, his paramedic was shot at while trying to assist a young kidnapping victim. Dr. Gates transported the girl to County General following the arrest of her kidnapper. While assisting in the treatment of the girl, Gates meets Dr. Neela Rasgotra, who initially seems irritated by Dr. Gates, but the two soon develop a friendship. Dr. Gates later reveals to Dr. Rasgotra that he is actually a medical student who is spending time with the paramedics until he graduates.

In the episode, "Two Ships," when two airplanes collided and crashed in downtown Chicago, Dr. Gates and Dr. Rasgotra again worked together, this time out in the field. Dr. Gates was badly injured when he ran into a burning building to save a woman before the building exploded. Dr. Rasgotra was forced to perform a risky liver surgery on him in the field; however, Dr. Gates eventually recovered.

== Hospital life ==
John Stamos reprised his role as Gates at the start of season 13. His strong-willed and often rebellious attitude led him to a few confrontations with attending Gregory Pratt, who often called him a "cowboy"; this provided an ironic counterpoint to Pratt's earlier similar difficulties with Luka Kovač and John Carter. Tony reunited with Neela and had his feelings for her rekindled. The two bickered with one another but eventually had a fling.
