= Peter Benton =

Fictional character

- Eriq La Salle as Peter Benton
- First appearance: September 19, 1994 (1x01, "24 Hours")
- Last appearance: April 2, 2009 (15x22, "And in the End...")
- Portrayed by: Eriq La Salle
- Duration: 1994–2001, 2002, 2009

In-universe information
- Title(s): Resident (1994–1999); Trauma Fellow (1999–2000); Attending (2000–2001)
- Occupation: Surgeon
- Family: Cleo Finch (girlfriend/ later wife); Unnamed father (deceased); Mae Benton (mother, deceased); Jackie Robbins (elder sister); Walter Robbins (brother-in-law); Jesse Robbins (nephew, deceased); Joanie Robbins (niece); Steven Robbins (nephew)
- Children: Reese Benton
- Born: 1965

Peter Benton, M.D. is a fictional character from the NBC medical drama series ER, portrayed by actor Eriq La Salle, appearing as a primary character from the pilot episode until part way through the eighth season.

La Salle made two guest appearances in later episodes of the eighth season, before returning again for two more episodes in the fifteenth season, including the series finale.

== Casting ==
Although Benton was an original character, according to an interview La Salle gave in 1997, he was cast late in the role, after the first season had already started filming. He recalled, "I was surprisingly calm. When casting waits that long, they're basically waiting for someone to come in and take the role. I was ready and completely focused. I came into the office with a stethoscope and surgical greens I had left over from [a previous role in] The Human Factor. When I left, I wanted them to say 'That's Dr. Benton'". Within three days of his audition, La Salle was offered the role of Dr. Benton.

== Development ==
The name of the character was inspired by The Peter Bent Brigham Hospital (now part of the Brigham and Women's Hospital in Boston, Massachusetts) which was a teaching hospital for Harvard Medical School, where series originator Michael Crichton studied medicine, although (perhaps coincidentally) the birth name of Crichton's wife at the time, Anne-Marie Martin, was also Benton.

Several relationships were scripted into the character's narrative. In Season 4 he began dating Dr. Elizabeth Corday, played by Alex Kingston. Both surgeons and the characters competed with each other professionally and failed to be adequately supportive of each other in their personal crises, so Corday ends the relationship in Season 5. According to an article published in Jet in 1999, Eriq La Salle was the reason why the romance dissolved. He was unhappy that Benton's interracial romance with Corday was being shown as less problematic than his prior romances with black characters, such as Jeanie Boulet (played by Gloria Reuben) and Carla Reese (played by Lisa Nicole Carson). In an interview, La Salle stated, "As an African-American man, it becomes a bit offensive if the negative things are all you're showing. Because in real life we romance and get on each other's nerves and laugh and do all the things that any other race of people do. So if the only time you show a balanced relationship is in an interracial relationship, whether it's conscious or sub-conscious, it sends a message I'm not comfortable with." Mindful of the image that he was portrayed on television, La Salle asked producers to end Benton's interracial romance. While being interviewed by Johnnie Cochran on Johnnie Cochran Tonight, La Salle commented, "We have to take care of the message that we're sending as African-Americans or any other group of minorities, that we have the exact same type of exchanges with our mates that we get to see our White counterparts have." In a subsequent episode, Benton was shown to be compassionate to his former girlfriend, Jeanie.

== Early days ==
Benton was first introduced in the pilot as a second-year surgical resident. When all the attending surgeons are occupied in other surgeries, Benton decides to operate without supervision to control a bleeding aneurysm and keep a man alive until a qualified surgeon is available. Although he does this technically against regulations, he is supported after the fact by attending physician (and ER chief) David Morgenstern.

== Family and friends ==
=== Jackie and Peter's mother ===
In Season 1, we learn that Dr. Benton's mother has had a stroke and is mostly being cared for by his sister Jackie, who wants to move her into an assisted living facility, an option to which Peter is strongly opposed. One night when Benton is watching his mother in Jackie's home, she falls down the stairs and breaks her hip.

=== Jeanie Boulet ===
Benton meets Jeanie Boulet, a married Physician Assistant, at the hospital. Impressed, he hires her to work with his mother as a physical therapist. Benton's mother dies, devastating him, and when Jeanie comforts him, they end up having an affair. In Season 2, Benton's affair with Jeanie ends. Jeanie separates from her husband Al and learns that he contracted HIV from an affair, and furthermore that he passed the disease on to her; however, Jeanie does not pass the virus to Peter.

=== Carla Reese ===
In Season 3, Peter becomes involved with a former girlfriend, Carla Reese, who soon becomes pregnant. She gives birth to a son, Reese Benton, who is born prematurely. It is later discovered that, possibly from complications from Reese's prematurity or his NICU treatment, the boy is deaf. Peter, at first, has difficulty accepting that his son is deaf and looks into surgeries to restore his ability to hear, but he later makes his peace with who Reese is, and he and Carla teach him to communicate through sign language. Later, Carla begins a new relationship with a man named Roger McGrath (which she clumsily, and unsuccessfully, tried to keep a secret from a non-plussed Peter) and eventually marries him. At the end of Season 5, Carla more or less tells Peter that her new marriage to Roger means she will be taking Reese with them to Roger's new job in Germany and responds to Peter's shocked and angry response by saying "this WILL happen".

At the start of Season 6, legal proceedings have begun over Peter's refusal to agree to Carla's demands. Carla once again angers Peter by whining that he should just step aside and agree with her and then shocks Peter by telling him that he may not be Reese's father, saying that she needed him to be a father at the time but Roger can fill that role in the future (back in Season 3, Carla was angry when Peter asked if she was sure he was the father). Peter takes a DNA test to determine whether or not Carla's suspicions are true, but he chooses not to receive the results and decides he will be Reese's father regardless of biology. Carla does not respond to Peter's pleas to end the legal fight, but on Christmas Eve shows up angrily at the hospital with Reese and bitterly tells him "you win" and sarcastically thanks him for ruining her and Roger's lives, as Roger's boss booted him from the Germany-based promotion over the time he spent in court and they will have to remain in Chicago; Peter bluntly says he is sorry about the job but not sorry that his son will remain in the same city as him. In Season 7, Carla shows up anew to openly flirt with Peter, cause problems between him and his new girlfriend Cleo Finch, and lie to Roger about Peter hitting on her to the point where Roger and Peter have an altercation in the ER.

In the 2nd episode of Season 8, Carla is killed in a car accident. Peter takes Reese into his full custody, but when Roger continues to appeal for time with his stepson, Peter insists that Roger move on with his life and stay away. Roger sues Peter for custody of Reese, and his lawyers force Peter to address the fact that he may not be Reese's biological father. Peter takes another paternity test and this time learns the truth—he is not Reese's biological father. Roger's lawyer makes an issue of the long hours' Peter's job demands, whereas Roger works from home and commands his own schedule.

During court, Peter perjures himself on the witness stand and proclaims that he has been given a new schedule with reduced working hours at County General Hospital. A furious Roger confronts Peter about lying, but quickly turns abusive when he dares Peter to hit him and then says Peter "can't give your sister a new kid!" (Jackie Robbins’s son Jesse was murdered in Season 7 by gang members). Peter later goes to his supervisor, Dr. Robert Romano, and asks for such a schedule, but Romano cannot offer only daytime hours. Peter hands in his resignation, and he goes to the out-of-town clinic where his girlfriend Cleo Finch now works to try to get a job there. He is successful and gets the hours he had promised the judge, and he is awarded sole custody of Reese with Roger receiving visitation rights. When a saddened Roger brings Reese's Christmas presents to the hospital later that day, Peter, knowing that Roger is important to Reese, tells Roger to come to his and Cleo's home on Christmas Day and give the presents to Reese himself. He does tell Roger he is doing this not for Roger's sake but for Reese and both men tacitly acknowledge Peter has won.

=== Elizabeth Corday ===
When British surgeon Dr. Elizabeth Corday starts work at County General Hospital, she is quickly attracted to Benton, though he initially disregards her attentions. At length, Elizabeth tells him she believes that he does not want to pursue a relationship with her because of their racial difference, and Benton finally grudgingly admits to her that "I do have a problem dating white women." Professionally, Benton and Corday attempt to outdo each other several times and both are eventually given the opportunity to work with Dr. Robert Romano. Later in the year, Benton assists with a surgery performed by his mentor Dr. David Morgenstern. Morgenstern (who has been somewhat hesitant about surgery following his heart attack) makes a serious mistake that endangers the patient's life. Benton shoves him out of the way to take over the operation, with Elizabeth walking in too late to see Morgenstern's mistake but witnessing Benton's actions toward Morgenstern. Benton is suspended and comes close to losing his job before Morgenstern finally comes forward with the videotape of the operation, which exonerates his former student.

Morgenstern then resigns from the hospital, and a distraught Peter begins an affair with Elizabeth. They remain together through much of the following two years, although their relationship eventually begins to suffer due to Peter's needing to spend more time attending to Reese. Elizabeth helps him realize that their romance isn't going anywhere, and they end their affair, though they remain close friends and colleagues. Their friendship is troubled, however, when Elizabeth approaches the hospital staff with the idea of a trauma surgical fellowship. Benton withdraws his tentative commitment to Romano's cardiothoracic fellowship (which would be extremely time-consuming) and campaigns for and is granted the trauma fellowship. Elizabeth feels betrayed by Peter and, wishing to stay at County, takes Romano's cardiothoracic fellowship offer.

Alex Kingston, who played Corday, later said: "[Y]ou see interracial relationships all over the place [outside America]. I kind of naively thought it would be even more liberal in America. And it couldn't have been further from the truth. In fact, I'm trying to think if there's a television show right now [in 2013] where there's an African American and Caucasian relationship. They're few and far between."

=== Cleo Finch ===
In Season 6, Benton began dating Dr. Cleo Finch, an ER pediatrician. Their relationship was stormy because of Peter's ex-girlfriend Carla, but in Season 8 they leave Chicago along with Benton's son Reese to start a new life. Peter Benton and Cleo Finch transferred to a different hospital. In the season 15 episode "Old Times," Benton is seen wearing a wedding ring, and it is assumed he and Cleo are now married.

=== John Carter ===
In the pilot episode, John Carter is introduced as a third-year medical student on his ER rotation. He is assigned to Benton, who proceeds to give Carter a hard time. They seldom get along and their personalities clash on many occasions. Benton is more ambitious and focused on surgery whereas Carter is more compassionate and willing to spend time with patients, a trait that "drove [Benton] crazy" as he put it to Cleo, although he considered Carter to be a talented and smart doctor. In Season 3, Benton develops appendicitis and Carter operates on him. However, Carter eventually decided to leave surgery for emergency medicine, a decision that caused him to clash with Benton. Nonetheless, the two have reconciled and, despite the fact that they have interacted less since Carter's transition to emergency medicine, formed a deep friendship.

In Season 6, Benton was visibly concerned about Carter after he was stabbed by a schizophrenic patient and eventually operates on him along with Dr. Anspaugh. During the surgery, Benton has become protective of Carter and expresses reluctance to leave his former protégé for another patient. Soon after, upon hearing Carter becoming addicted to painkillers, he refuses to watch Carter self-destruct and convinces Carter to enter rehab.

In Season 8, before Dr. Benton departs County General, his final farewell is to Carter. As a going-away present, Carter hands Benton a train token; it is the same one Benton had given him shortly after he started in the ER. Carter was left exhausted and distraught after a shift where the ER had handled a mass casualty, and when he admitted the night had devastated him and Benton simply gave him the token and said that if he was serious about being a good doctor, he would use it to come back to work the next day. Carter did return for his scheduled shift but kept that token as a reminder of what the job entailed.

In Season 15, he reunited with Carter when he was in need of a kidney transplant. Benton supervises the operation at the hospital where he works and makes sure that his old friend and colleague get the best medical support. As Benton knew that Carter has gone to Africa for the past 4 years, it is likely that both doctors kept in limited contact with each other while working at different hospitals.

== Career ==
Dr. Romano eventually offers Benton an attending trauma surgeon position, but when a Medicare patient needs surgery that Romano refuses to allow to be performed, Benton calls social services and informs them of the refusal of care. Romano intercepts the patient as social services arrive and performs the surgery, but he is enraged at Peter for calling them. Romano then retracts the idea of an attending trauma surgeon, explaining to Peter that the fines social services and Medicare inflicted on the hospital roughly equal what Peter's yearly salary would have been. Romano then offers Benton a per diem surgical position with reduced benefits and more difficult scheduling, but Benton refuses. Romano also uses his considerable influence to blacklist Benton throughout the medical community, making it impossible for Benton to find a job in Chicago. Corday finds a new job for him in Philadelphia, but Carla will not continue joint custody of Reese if Peter leaves town (citing Peter's resistance to her and her husband Roger's plans to move the year before). Peter is then forced to go to Romano and accept the per diem position.

After the court battle between Roger and himself, Benton is forced to move away from County to work better hours in another hospital, in order to gain custody of Reese. In his last surgery at County, Benton miraculously saves a six-year-old victim of a shooting accident.

== After County General ==
After leaving the series, Benton was seen a few more times. The first time was when he was passing the torch to Dr. Corday and she told him that her marriage to Benton's friend and colleague Dr. Mark Greene was in trouble. His next appearance was at the funeral of Greene. Benton appears in a photo as part of a slideshow at Dr. Carter's farewell party, and Benton is heard in a voiceover memory as Carter leaves the ER for the last time in the 11th-season finale. Eriq La Salle made an uncredited appearance in the opening of "Heal Thyself" to tell the audience of the death of the show's creator Michael Crichton.

== Season 15 ==
During the 15th and final season of ER, at the end of the episode "The Book of Abby", long-serving nurse Haleh Adams shows the departing Abby Lockhart a closet wall where all the past doctors and employees have put their locker name tags. Among them, the tag "Benton" can be seen.

Benton returns in the 19th episode of the 15th (final) season of ER in the episode "Old Times" which first was broadcast on 12 March 2009. In the episode, he visits an old friend and former student John Carter who is awaiting a kidney transplant, and it is revealed that Benton has left private practice for a surgical attending position at Northwestern University Hospital now that Reese is thirteen. He is seen wearing a wedding ring, so it is assumed he has married Cleo Finch who Benton states is at home watching Reese. Benton decides to observe Carter's transplant and Benton's insistence on being thorough, which annoys the surgeon, allows a complication to be resolved and the surgery to be a success.

In the series finale, Benton goes to Carter's opening of his new hospital with Reese. He also goes to the afterparty with Carter, Susan Lewis, and Kerry Weaver and meets Elizabeth Corday and Rachel Greene.

== Reception ==
Dr. Peter Benton was named the #10 Top TV Dad by SocialTechPop in 2011. Entertainment Weekly included him in their list of the "21 Most Annoying TV Characters Ever".
