= Robert Romano (ER) =

- Paul McCrane as Robert Romano
- First appearance: October 30, 1997 (4x05, "Good Touch, Bad Touch")
- Last appearance: November 13, 2008 (15x07, "Heal Thyself")
- Portrayed by: Paul McCrane
- Duration: 1997–2003, 2008

In-universe information
- Nickname: Rocket
- Gender: Male
- Title(s): Attending Physician (1997–2003); Chief of Staff and Surgery (1999–2003); Chief of Emergency Medicine (2003)
- Occupation: Physician; Surgeon
- Nationality: American

Robert "Rocket" Romano, M.D., F.A.C.S. is a fictional character in the medical drama ER, portrayed by American actor Paul McCrane. He was introduced in the fourth season as a recurring character. He evolves from being a surgical attending physician to chief of staff at Chicago's County General Hospital, with McCrane being promoted to series regular from the sixth season until Romano's death in the tenth season.

Romano is known for his abrasive personality and sarcastic comments. He typically serves as an antagonist during his time on the series.

McCrane returned to make one further guest appearance in the final season.

== Development ==
Romano was a recurring character during the fourth and fifth seasons of the series. He became a regular character during the sixth-season premiere. In a script from the sixth season, Romano is described as having "no soul".

In an interview with the Orlando Sentinel, McCrane discussed the sequence in which Romano loses his arm in a helicopter accident during the ninth season premiere. McCrane explained: "In terms of my action, I stood up, continuing a motion of having picked up this chart that fell on the tarmac. I swung my arm up and was yanked back by a cable [...] and at whatever point would have been accurate, when my arm was on its way up, they painted in the dismembered part flying up and off camera." The effect was achieved by fitting a prosthesis onto McCrane's shoulder while he kept his arm hidden within his clothing. According to The New York Times, it took McCrane just 20 minutes to shoot, but digitally creating and animating the helicopter, the blood, the wind and the Chicago skyline took the Stargate team a full week.

The character was killed off halfway through the tenth season. McCrane was disappointed by the producers' decision, but knew his character "had run its course". Producer Chris Chulack went on by stating "Even a horrific helicopter accident last season – in which his arm was severed, ending his career as a surgeon – could not curtail his inappropriate, sarcastic remarks. There wasn't much to be done."

After McCrane left the main cast of ER, he went on to direct multiple episodes of the series along with Laura Innes after her departure in Season 13.

== Character history ==
Romano is introduced in the fourth season's episode "Good Touch, Bad Touch" as a surgical attending sponsoring Elizabeth Corday's internship in the Chicago ER. An insecure, egocentric man, Romano is nonetheless a brilliant surgeon. The majority of the staff deeply dislike him for his arrogance, insensitive sarcasm, abrasive and brusque demeanor, and inappropriate remarks towards female staff. After the resignation of ER chief David Morgenstern, Romano offers to take the job as a step towards eventually becoming hospital Chief of Staff.

In the fifth season, Dr. Maggie Doyle accuses Romano of sexual harassment and when she learns Elizabeth Corday had also been sexually harassed, asks for her support. Corday withdraws her support after Romano blackmails her about her past relationship with Dr. Peter Benton. Romano becomes the Acting ER Chief when Dr. Donald Anspaugh mentions he cannot cope with being the Acting ER Chief as well as hospital Chief of Staff, much to the dismay of the ER staff.

The Romano character is promoted to series regular in the sixth season when he replaces Anspaugh as Chief of Staff; most of the staff are unhappy with his appointment though he promotes Corday to Associate Chief of Surgery. Kerry Weaver and Mark Greene agreed to oppose the promotion, but after Greene voiced his opposition in the subsequent meeting Weaver changed her mind and supported him, earning the permanent ER Chief position from Romano and the ire of Greene. He becomes fond of medical student Lucy Knight after she convinces him to do a heart operation on a patient on Christmas Eve. He and Corday treat Lucy after she is stabbed by a schizophrenic patient. When Lucy dies despite their feverish work to save her, he is grief stricken and, later in the episode, is found by Weaver closing Lucy's chest incision by himself.

In the seventh season, when Benton arranges for the surgery of a Medicare patient over Romano's objections, Romano fires Benton and then blacklists him throughout the medical community. Unable to find a job in Chicago, Benton is forced to return under a daily call, no-benefits job. Benton does the job with little complaint and Romano "rewards" him with a raise and benefits but also manipulates him into taking on a new post related to affirmative action at the hospital. In addition, Romano relentlessly plots to fire Dr. Kim Legaspi, a psychiatric attending and love interest of Weaver. Weaver first came out of the closet to Romano when announcing she would defend Legaspi. In "Survival of the Fittest," a pregnant Corday performs a grueling surgery just to prove to Romano that she can. To Corday's surprise, Romano has dinner delivered to the hospital for her afterwards in an unexpected but genuine gesture of kindness. Earlier in the season when Corday loses her confidence after a botched operation causes the paralysis of a patient, Romano helps her to overcome her fear by ignoring her pages for assistance while she performs the same type of surgery on a different patient, though he secretly watches from the viewing gallery.

In the next season, Legaspi moves to San Francisco and Romano tells Weaver her sexual orientation is a private matter and none of his concern. Romano continues his arrogant and insensitive behavior throughout the season, but again shows compassion when Corday is distraught by Greene's decision to discontinue his brain cancer treatment.

In the first episode of season nine, Romano, Luka Kovac, and Susan Lewis are evacuating the hospital due to a Monkey Pox outbreak. While they are on the helipad to load a patient onto a waiting helicopter, the wind blows the chart off the gurney; when Romano moves to retrieve it, the helicopter rotor severs his arm. Lewis and Kovac rush to save his life. Although surgeons manage to reattach the arm, Romano begins to lose motion and sensation in it. Over time he increasingly displays an inability to cope with his injury. He shows one of his last moments of kindness on the episode “A Hopeless Wound” when Corday loses her wedding ring down the scrub sink drain and fears it will be lost because maintenance is closed until morning. After she finishes a surgery, he returns the ring to her, having used a fiberscope and grabber to retrieve it from the drain. Eventually Dr. Anspaugh removes Romano from the Chief of Staff position and replaces him with Weaver; they offer Romano the position of Chief of the ER as a consolation. Romano's belligerent and abrasive personality strongly intensifies after he grudgingly accepts the demotion. On his first day, he insults everyone, disrespects patients and displays ignorance of modern ER medicine by prescribing an antiquated treatment that has to be changed by Dr. Carter. During the season he fires senior nurses Haleh Adams, Lydia Wright, Conni Oligario, and Yosh Takata, though Adams and Wright both return. He did however appear more respectful towards Dr Lewis, describing her as the “least annoying” amongst the ER staff. By season's end, Romano suffers severe burns to his arm without feeling them, prompting him to decide to have it amputated.

In the tenth season, Romano gets a robotic arm. In the episode "Freefall," he is killed when a helicopter falls off the hospital roof and crushes him. Prior to his death, he intended to begin dismissal proceedings against Dr. Greg Pratt and caught Dr. Archie Morris smoking marijuana in the parking lot. He wills a significant sum of money to the hospital which Weaver uses to fund a gay and lesbian medical program. In "Missing," Corday tries to organize a memorial for Romano, but learns she is the only person who misses him. A plaque honoring Romano is mounted on the wall between the two main elevators, then later removed and not seen again after a shootout in the ER.

Romano appears in a flashback sequence during the final season, talking with Dr. Greene about his chemotherapy. In the episode "The Book of Abby," long-serving nurse Haleh Adams shows Abby Lockhart a closet wall covered with the locker name tags of past doctors and staff members, including Romano.

== Reception ==
In his book Writing for Visual Media, author Anthony Friedmann calls Romano a "mocking, sarcastic, nasty guy." Romano is described as a "boss from hell" by Stephen Battaglio in Los Angeles Times, while he was reviewing the characters' death. Romano's death was described by Michael Ausiello as "shocking" and as if it was "ripped straight from The Wizard of Oz", and calls Romano "County General's very own Wicked Physician." In a review several years later for NJ.com, Alan Sepinwall called Romano's death "one of the silliest moments in ER history."
