= Elizabeth Corday =

Fictional character in ER

- Alex Kingston as Elizabeth Corday
- First appearance: September 25, 1997 (4x01, "Ambush")
- Last appearance: April 02, 2009 (15x22, "And in the End...")
- Portrayed by: Alex Kingston
- Duration: 1997–2004, 2009

In-universe information
- Nickname: Lizzie
- Gender: Female
- Title(s): Surgical Trauma Fellow (1997–1998); Surgical Intern (1998–1999); Surgical Attending (1999–2004); Associate Chief of Surgery (1999–2003); Chief of Surgery (2003–2004)
- Occupation: Physician; Surgeon
- Family: Charles Corday (father); Isabelle Corday (mother)
- Spouse: Mark Greene (deceased)
- Children: Ella Greene (daughter, with Mark); Rachel Greene (stepdaughter)
- Relatives: Other family members
- Nationality: (England) English

Elizabeth Corday (married name Greene) is a fictional character in the medical drama series ER, portrayed by British actress Alex Kingston. She first appeared at the beginning of the fourth season and became a lead character before departing towards the start of the eleventh season.

Kingston returned to make two further guest appearances in the final season of the show.

== Background ==
First appearing at the opening of season four in the episode "Ambush", Elizabeth Corday is a British surgeon who has moved to Chicago to gain more experience in trauma surgery. We learn in her first episode that she comes from a whole family of surgeons; Corday's grandfather was a surgeon, as is her father and, since there are no boys in her family, she took on that role. In a later episode we learn that her father is a Consultant surgeon at St. Thomas' Hospital, London. Corday's mother (played by Judy Parfitt) is an astrophysicist with whom she has a strained relationship. However, she has a good relationship with her father, Charles (although he is hostile towards her mother, having been divorced over ten years prior).

During Corday's first trauma surgery she confuses the rest of the staff by using British terms uncommon in America - for example, she asks them to "bleep Benton" (page Dr. Peter Benton), order an "FBC" (American term "CBC"), and perform a "tube thoracostomy" (American term "chest tube"). She also introduces herself as "Miss Corday", as is customary for members of the Royal College of Surgeons of England, and not "Dr Corday". She quickly gains a reputation for being unimpressed by social status.

She befriends many of the female ER staff, including Carol Hathaway and Dr. Anna del Amico; and later on Abby Lockhart and Susan Lewis. Despite her professional demeanor, she is compassionate and provides support at critical moments for both staff and patients. Despite their long and adversarial history, she supports Robert Romano through the ordeal with the loss of his arm; and similarly she overcomes her deep dislike of Kerry Weaver to be supportive of her following the death of her partner Sandy Lopez, although they never really mend fences and this plays a large part in her exit from County. Corday is also very good friends with John Carter. However, Corday can also be extremely harsh in criticizing her fellow physicians, such as when she berated David Malucci for abandoning his med student with a patient.

Because of the strong ties she has made with Chicago, Corday decides to stay on after her fellowship is terminated, even though this means that she has to repeat her internship in order to get a license to practice in the United States during Season 5. This is a particularly trying time for her - she has to adjust to being at the bottom of the heap after enjoying so long at the top, and on top of that she is supervised initially by Dale Edson - described even by Romano as a weasel. During this time, she makes repeated attempts to become romantically involved with Benton, eventually succeeding. He even agrees to take over as her supervisor after a while. She faces further trouble when, at the end of a 36-hour shift, she makes a non-lethal mistake in calculating how much drug to inject into a patient. This doesn't put her off her stride, and she uses it to campaign for better conditions for junior medical staff. She also amicably ends her romantic relationship with Peter after that (while Eriq La Salle requested the relationship be written out saying: "As an African-American man, it becomes a bit offensive if the negative things are all you're showing. Because in real life we romance and get on each other's nerves and laugh and do all the things that any other race of people do. So if the only time you show a balanced relationship is in an interracial relationship, whether it's conscious or sub-conscious, it sends a message I'm not comfortable with." Kingston did not find issues with it: "[Y]ou see interracial relationships all over the place [outside America]. I kind of naively thought it would be even more liberal in America. And it couldn't have been further from the truth. In fact, I'm trying to think if there's a television show right now [in 2013] where there's an African American and Caucasian relationship. They're few and far between."). However, the affair ends up haunting her later on when Dr. Maggie Doyle correctly accuses Dr. Romano of sexual harassment after he finds out she was gay and gives her a bad performance review; Corday wants to go on the record to support Doyle's claims, but is forced to back down when Romano reveals he'd known she was dating Peter secretly while he was her supervisor.

After completing her internship at the end of Season 5, at the start of Season 6 Corday is offered the position of Associate Chief of Surgery by newly appointed Chief of Staff Romano, who announces the appointment without even asking her. She takes the job, however, and soon finds herself getting caught up in hospital politics. Despite her attempts to get along, a rift soon develops between her and Cleo Finch, Benton's new love interest.

In season 6, Corday saves the life of a serial rapist and killer who starts to engage her in a series of mind games. When a victim's family wants to learn of their daughter's body's location, the killer manipulates Corday into euthanizing him in exchange for the location. At the last minute, Corday realizes that the killer was afraid of her for the power that she held over him and she spares his life, breaking his will and 'winning the game'.

== Corday and Greene's marriage ==
Corday becomes romantically involved with Dr. Mark Greene during season 5. They become engaged in season 7. Shortly after becoming engaged Elizabeth and Mark learn she is pregnant.

Corday's engagement to Greene is difficult for both parties. Corday faces struggles at work after she is sued for allegedly rushing an operation (leading to paralysis of the patient), and her pregnancy is nearly compromised when she goes into labor whilst on scene at a train wreck. Greene is diagnosed with a terminal brain tumor, but is given hope of a reprieve though, when Greene finds a surgeon in New York who can remove the tumor. Corday accompanies Greene to New York City and is present in the operating room for the procedure, by his side the whole time. The couple later get married (after a series of glitches with the transport for both parties) and appear to be very happy. Corday is heavily pregnant at the time of the wedding, and gives birth to baby, Ella, a short time later.

This happiness is not maintained for very long, however - Greene's daughter Rachel (from his previous marriage to Jen) has grown from a temperate child into a troubled and moody teenager. After falling out with Jen, whom she deems too strict, Rachel moves in with Greene, Corday and baby Ella, hoping for an easier life. Rachel soon finds her father is as strict as her mother and begins acting out, culminating eventually in Ella swallowing ecstasy that belonged to Rachel while she was babysitting her sister. Corday is so furious that she tells Rachel to leave the house, and after Mark refuses to send Rachel back to Jen or press charges, Corday moves out instead, taking Ella with her.

During their estrangement, Greene learns that his tumour has returned and that this time it is inoperable. She indirectly finds out about his plight from Susan (who doesn't outright say Mark's cancer is back, but makes it so obvious that Corday gets it), and her half-hearted initial claim to him that she'll come back home is rejected by Mark, with him saying he doesn't want her to return on account of his terminal illness. Corday later has a medical case hit close to home (a selfish woman's sister refuses to agree to a life-saving liver transplant procedure) and after getting a dose-of-reality from speaking to Romano, Corday does move back in with him and Rachel. Greene eventually leaves Chicago to spend his final days with his daughter in Hawaii. On the walk home after a day of surfing, Mark suffers a seizure and in a panic, Rachel calls Corday, who arrives in Hawaii soon after with Ella. The four spend Mark's last few days bonding and overcoming obstacles. Corday tells Rachel after Mark's funeral that it would be all right for her to visit her sister, and later on she does so and Corday bemusedly helps Rachel acquire birth control pills when her stepdaughter shows up with her teenage boyfriend. She does pointedly tell Rachel that another doctor put his name on the order for them because she's not going to be a scapegoat if Jen finds out Rachel is sexually active, and Rachel nods her understanding. Corday's tension with her stepdaughter seems to be over at this point; she helps Rachel without question, and Rachel does not judge the fact that Corday is dating again, saying that Mark would have wanted her to find someone and that they both miss him. They also both agree, with quiet sadness, that they loved Mark and deeply miss him.

== Aftermath ==
After Greene's death, Corday returns to England for several weeks, but she finds that she can no longer fit in after having been in the United States for so long, suffering bullying and sexist treatment at the hands of her British colleagues for her 'American' ways.

Corday returns to her job at County General soon after the start of season 9, where she becomes harsh with patients, curt with colleagues, and particularly clashes with med student Paul Nathan (Don Cheadle) who is trying to become a physician despite advancing Parkinson's disease. Corday later confronts her agony over Mark's death and also makes peace with Nathan during a horrifying case where the wife and son of a decent man have been killed by a drunk driver, and they are able to save his other son by doing a transplant from the dying son. Corday is saddened to see Romano losing his career due to his arm amputation/reattachment. An even bigger blow hits Corday later during Season 10 when Robert Romano is killed in a helicopter accident. Later in the season, Dr. Corday is appointed to Chief of Surgery by Kerry Weaver.

In her love life, she has some trouble moving on and making the right choices. She begins a relationship with a charismatic surgeon, Dr. Dorset (Bruno Campos), which quickly ends when she discovers that he is married. Later, she begins seeing two men at the same time, another doctor at County (Paul Blackthorne) and a teacher (Steven Culp).

In Season 11, Corday is angry that Kerry Weaver hired Dr. Lucien Dubenko to be a surgeon without consulting her (the Chief of Surgery), with Corday noting that this was the only candidate she had expressly recommended against. Kerry is confused/irritated about Corday's problems and doesn't understand why Corday is "taking this so personally." A sequence where Corday calls Dubenko "cowardly and cocky" for not doing an illegal transplant, and rails about Kerry's "treachery and ambition", was in the original broadcast of the episode "Try Carter" but has been edited out of syndicated repeat showings. Corday is convinced by Dr. John Carter to perform the illegal donation procedure between two HIV positive patients, both because she believes the operation is the right thing to do and also because it would anger Kerry (she also notes that a bill legalizing organ transplants between HIV+ individuals was approved by the Illinois state legislature and is stuck in bureaucratic limbo so the Governor hasn't been able to sign it into law). Corday does successfully perform the operation. This results in her facing the possibility of her losing her license and being dismissed from the staff. Weaver bluntly offers her the position of a clinical instructor with no possibility of tenure or future promotion, stating this was a compromise so that the hospital's Board of Directors would close the case without referring her to the State's Medical Review Board. With her career all but over at County, Corday quits her job and moves back to England. Corday's final appearance as a series regular was in Season 11, episode 4 "Fear".

Other offices
Preceded by N/A	Associate Chief of Surgery; 1999–2003	Succeeded by N/A
Preceded by Robert Romano	Chief of Surgery; 2003–2004	Succeeded by Lucien Dubenko

== After County General ==
During the 15th and final season of ER, at the end of the episode "The Book of Abby", long-serving nurse Haleh Adams shows the departing Abby Lockhart a closet wall where all the past doctors and employees have put their locker name tags. Amongst them, the tag "Corday" can be seen.

Elizabeth Corday returned to ER in the fifteenth season on January 15, 2009, in the episode "Dream Runner", in a one-episode return billed as a special appearance. Dr. Corday comes to County General to interview potential employees, including the surprised Neela Rasgotra, for positions at Duke University. She tells Neela that she lived in England for a few years after leaving Chicago but came back to the United States where she took a position as Chief of Trauma Surgery at Duke University in Durham, North Carolina, where she lives with nine-year-old Ella. Rachel too lives in Durham and attends Duke where she receives lowered tuition because Corday is on faculty. During the interview, Corday mentions having considered returning to County General briefly, but decided against it. She briefly meets Dr. Simon Brenner after finishing her interview with Neela.

In the series finale, Corday and Rachel meet up with John Carter, Kerry Weaver, Susan Lewis, and Peter Benton after the opening of Carter's project the Joshua Carter Center. After the reunion, Peter walks her to her car in a scene where the spark of their previous relationship and later friendship can be seen once more.
