= Anna Del Amico =

- Maria Bello as Anna Del Amico
- First appearance: May 1, 1997. (3x20, "Random Acts")
- Last appearance: May 14, 1998. (4x22, "A Hole in the Heart")
- Portrayed by: Maria Bello
- Duration: 1997–98

In-universe information
- Gender: Female
- Title: Fellow (1997–1998)
- Occupation: Physician
- Family: Unnamed Brothers (one named Hank)
- Nationality: Italian-American

Dr. Anna Del Amico is a fictional medical doctor from the television series ER. She was portrayed by Maria Bello.

== Life and time at County ==
Del Amico first appeared in the show in 1997, guest starring in the last 3 episodes of the third season. Having previously completed a pediatrics residency, she comes to County General as an emergency medicine intern wishing to double-board in both emergency medicine and pediatrics. As a series regular in the fourth season, her experience as a pediatrician initially causes friction with Doug Ross, who is a pediatric emergency medicine fellow. She becomes a doctor consultant in the clinic run by Carol Hathaway. She helps Carter detox his cousin Chase. She has had to do this with her ex-boyfriend Max and knows what he is going through. During her brief stint at County General, Anna also became good friends with Carol Hathaway and Elizabeth Corday.

Del Amico starts to become close to Carter through the season and admits there has been some chemistry between the two of them, but she never exactly returns the same strong feelings Carter has for her. Anna felt insulted when she discovers Carter's family fortune that he kept secret. Del Amico felt betrayed and fooled after giving him a glimpse of her poor struggling lifestyle. She never felt secure in such a wealthy setting and was always happy with her 'getting by day to day' persona. The two hold the same passion for medicine and eventually share a kiss. Carter and Anna's relationship is strained when Anna's ex Dr. Max Rocher comes to Chicago to see her. Anna is not confident in trusting Max after his rough drug addiction and is frustrated whenever she has to deal with Carter and Max in the same room. Her character is not seen again after the end of season 4.

== Season Five ==
She was mentioned again in the fifth season and her disappearance was explained to Lucy Knight by Dr. Carter who received her locker after her departure. She was said to have moved to Philadelphia to work in a pediatric ER and that it was better for her because it was where she was from, where she grew up, where her family was, and that she had a boyfriend there.
