= Susan Lewis =

Fictional character in the TV medical drama series "ER"

Susan Lewis, MD
- Sherry Stringfield as Susan Lewis
- First appearance: September 19, 1994 (1x01, "24 Hours")
- Last appearance: April 2, 2009 (15x22, "And In The End")
- Portrayed by: Sherry Stringfield
- Duration: 1994–96, 2001–05, 2009

In-universe information
- Nickname: Susie, Suss
- Title: Resident (1994–1996); Attending (2001–2005); Chief of Emergency Medicine (2004–2005)
- Occupation: Emergency Physician
- Family: Henry Lewis (father); Irene “Cookie” Lewis (mother, deceased); Chloe Lewis (sister)
- Spouse: Chuck Martin (ex-husband)
- Significant other: Div Cvetic (ex-boyfriend); John Carter (ex-boyfriend)
- Children: Cosmo Martin (son, with Chuck)
- Relatives: Suzie Lewis (niece)

Susan Lewis, M.D. is a character from the medical drama series ER, portrayed by American actress Sherry Stringfield.

Susan appeared as a primary character in the pilot episode and left the show part way through in the third season. She later returned in the eighth season and remained as a member of the main cast until the start of the twelfth season. Finally, she returned to make a guest appearance in the series finale.

== Casting ==
Casting director John Levey said, “At that time [Stringfield] was on NYPD Blue as a series regular in their first season. She was very unhappy for whatever reason, and she shared that with us on the plane. We got excited about her and read her when we came back. I remember her scene with the late Miguel Ferrer — she had to tell him that he had a cancer diagnosis, and she said something like, ‘Nothing is certain. Nothing, nothing at all.’ She had a wholesomeness and a lovely ability to make people identify with her and trust her. You would want her or someone like her to give you terrible news. It would be better than someone harsh giving you terrible news.”

== Development ==
During the third season of the series, actress Sherry Stringfield left the series for the first time. In an interview with the Chicago Tribune, Stringfield explained that having a family was one of the primary reasons she left the show. According to Entertainment Weekly, Stringfield's decision to quit angered the show's executive producer John Wells, because she left just as Dr. Lewis got embroiled in a budding romance with Anthony Edwards' Dr. Mark Greene. Stringfield revealed it was not a pleasant situation and, "The producers were in shock. They tried to talk me out of it. It took a long time to get out of my contract."

However, by the eighth season, Stringfield's schedule allowed her to return to the series. Wells said they were "delighted to welcome her back as a series regular and [couldn't] wait to work with her again." Stringfield remained in the main cast for four more seasons, until August 2005, when she announced that she would be leaving the show again and stated: "I am extremely grateful for the time I spent on ER. It is a wonderful show, and there are so many people I will miss. But I'm ready for new roles and new challenges."

== Character history ==
=== Seasons 1–3 and first Departure (1994–1996) ===
In season 1, Susan is a second-year resident. She is shown to be an eager and competent young doctor working in the emergency department of County General Hospital. She is good friends with Nurse Carol Hathaway, Dr. Doug Ross and especially Dr. Mark Greene, who is her best friend.

Though an extremely capable doctor, Susan is initially seen to have problems asserting herself. This is frequently taken advantage of by the senior and more forthright doctors in the hospital, such as Dr. Peter Benton and particularly Dr. Jack Kayson. This leads to several confrontations and animosity worsens when Kayson discharges one of Susan's patients, failing to notice the severity of his symptoms, which ultimately leads to the patient's death.

Kayson attempts to shift the blame onto Susan, leading to doubts about her competence. Her supervisor, Mark, is compelled to oversee her actions, straining their friendship. In the case review, the board ultimately sides with Susan and reprimands Kayson, much to his dissatisfaction.

Shortly after, Kayson is rushed into hospital suffering from a heart attack. Despite their past disagreement on the issue, Kayson opts for Susan's non-invasive form of treatment against the advice of a senior doctor, who (like Kayson) is an advocate of surgical angioplasty. Susan, finally asserting herself, stands her ground and rejects the idea of Kayson undergoing surgery. After his recovery, Kayson expresses gratitude by inviting Susan to be his valentine date, but she awkwardly declines.

Susan's personal life is far less settled than her professional one. In season 1, she is seen to have a brief relationship with psychiatrist Div Cvetic, who ultimately has a nervous breakdown and disappears. Susan later learns that he married someone he met through a dating service run by a taxi driver from his cab.

Most of her problems, however, are family-related. Susan's parents, Cookie and Henry, are shown to be flighty (her father is jokingly referred to as a test pilot for Barcalounger) and difficult to talk to. Her older sister, Chloe, is the source of most of her distress, with a seemingly never-ending series of problems with alcohol, drugs, men, and money. Chloe eventually has a baby girl, who she names Susan ("Little Susie") after her sister. During season 2 Chloe begins to use alcohol and drugs once again. After deciding that she cannot look after her baby, she leaves Chicago, abandoning Susie with a flustered and overworked Susan.

Susan as she appeared in 1996.

Susan struggles to be a good mother to the child while completing her demanding residency. Already overstressed, Susan clashes numerous times with the new Chief Resident, Kerry Weaver, forcing Mark Greene to step in between them. Animosity between Kerry and Susan lessens over time, but never goes away completely. Realizing that Chloe may never return, Susan considers giving Susie up for adoption. She gets as far as introducing the baby to potential adoptive parents, but cannot bring herself to part with her niece, so she decides to keep her and adopt the child as her own.

Susan grows extremely attached to the baby, but she gets a surprise when a reformed Chloe reappears later in the season and tries to reclaim "Little Susie". Susan can't see past Chloe's mistakes, regardless of her recent turnaround and new responsible boyfriend. Desperate to keep the baby, Susan attempts to fight Chloe for custody, but she is forced to reconsider when the judge warns her that she would lose. Susan begrudgingly reaches an agreement with her sister, and after regaining custody of "Little Susie", Chloe moves her family to Phoenix, Arizona, to start a new life.

Susan grapples with the loss of her niece, experiencing grief and seeking counseling. To escape loneliness, she immerses herself in work, impressing Weaver. With Mark's encouragement, Kerry offers Susan the position of chief resident. Although many ER staff members hoped for Susan to attain the title, she declines the position, expressing to Mark that there is more to life than work.

Setting up Stringfield's departure from the series in season 3, the beginnings of a romance develop between Susan and Mark, or more to the point, they are shown to have problems identifying their current relationship as friendship. Both seem timid and cautious around each other. Initially the more upfront one about the situation, Susan invites Mark to join her on holiday in Maui, Hawaii, but is embarrassed when he appears hesitant, causing her to later retract the offer, feeling she overstepped a boundary.

Fearful that he may have missed his chance with Susan, Mark attempts to convey his attraction upon her return, though he cannot find the courage to follow through and is left perplexed by Susan's reticence. It transpires that Susan never actually made it to Maui, instead visiting her sister and "Little Susie" in Phoenix because she could not overcome her fear of flying. Mark helps her overcome this fear in the following episode ("Fear of Flying"), supporting her during a medical helicopter flight rotation where they are called upon to treat victims of a serious car accident.

As they grow closer, Mark finally plucks up the courage to casually ask Susan out. She declines, telling him that they "need to talk". Shortly after, Mark witnesses Susan in numerous secret talks with the ER's chief of emergency medicine, David Morgenstern, and concludes that they are seeing each other. He confronts Susan, but she reveals that Morgenstern was merely helping her to transfer her residency. Desperately missing her niece, Susan has made the decision to move to Phoenix to be near her sister's family.

During a hectic last day for Susan at County's ER, Mark struggles with her imminent departure, but still finds himself afraid to admit his true feelings for her. The hospital staff arrange a going away party for Susan, but it is canceled due to an influx of critical patients from a car accident. Susan leaves the hospital unable to say goodbye to Mark, who was busy working on a trauma patient. He manages to arrive just as her train is about to depart (in the episode "Union Station"). Mark pleads with her to stay because he loves her, but Susan doesn't see a future in Chicago or with him. She kisses him and says, "I love you, too," as the train departs.

=== Seasons 8–12 and second departure (2001–2005) ===
Susan returns during season 8 as she left, arriving on a train into Chicago to interview for a job. Susan visits County General for the first time in 5 years and sees the hospital has changed as well as the faces. She meets Mark for coffee and reveals that Chloe has moved on to another city, and she has decided that she can't follow her sister's family around forever. Mark offers her a job as an attending physician at County General, despite Kerry Weaver's reservations.

Susan returns to County (2001).

During season 8 Susan has a brief relationship with Dr. John Carter after they both admit that they had a crush on each other when he was a medical student and she was a resident. It doesn't last, as Susan realizes in the episode "Secrets and Lies" that Carter is really in love with Abby Lockhart. She then tells Carter to "tell her" about his feelings. The two break up on good terms and remain good friends throughout the rest of her career at County.

Susan's problems with Chloe resurface when her niece Susie goes missing in New York after leaving a distressing voicemail message on her aunt's phone. Susan flies to New York (in a crossover with Third Watch) and discovers Chloe doped up and sleeping rough. "Little Susie" is ultimately found in the clutches of a man impersonating an NYPD officer, drugged but otherwise unharmed.

Throughout the season, Susan faces one of her most difficult story lines, as her best friend Mark Greene reveals to her that his brain tumor has returned. The two rekindle their close friendship as she helps him come to terms with his diagnosis. Susan is alluded to in Mark's goodbye letter in "The Letter" when Mark comments that he had to leave the way he did, even though there were things of a more personal nature to say.

After Mark's death, Susan warms up to other friendships with Abby Lockhart and Elizabeth Corday, and finds herself able to work better with Kerry Weaver. Dr. Romano, who actually respects her (he once told another doctor to fetch her when he had a medical emergency, calling her "the least annoying person down there"), promotes her to Deputy Chief of Emergency Medicine, much to Kerry Weaver's dismay.

During season 9, Susan meets a flight nurse named Chuck Martin (played by Donal Logue) on a plane to Las Vegas. They both get drunk upon arrival and end up getting married in Vegas. They quickly have the marriage annulled once they return to Chicago, but eventually start dating again, and Susan becomes pregnant. She is finally promoted to the position of Chief of Emergency Medicine after Robert Romano dies in season 10. While other pregnant characters had given birth on the show, at the time, Susan's was the first major birth offscreen, with her giving birth sometime between seasons 10 and 11 (and being placed on bedrest amid concerns of preterm labor). Chuck ends up caring for their baby boy Cosmo as a stay-at-home parent while Susan works.

In season 11, Susan begins to build some anxiety about an upcoming tenure offer. When the only tenure spot goes to her friend John Carter due to her lack of grant funding, she clearly gives up on County. This leads to her final exit from the series at the beginning of season 12, in the episode "Canon City". In contrast to the major attention given to Stringfield's departure from the series back in season 3's November sweeps period, her second goodbye came in the season 12 premiere, an episode which she had very little to do in, and gave no indication she was leaving for good (in fact, several episodes pass before Weaver tells the staff that Susan won't return, as she has accepted a tenure track position at a hospital in Iowa City, Iowa). Technically, Stringfield was the first and last original cast member to leave the show. (Being the first to leave in 1996, then in 2005 after the rest of the original cast left.)

=== Season 15 and finale appearance (2009) ===
In the season 15 episode "The Book of Abby", long-serving nurse Haleh Adams shows the departing Abby Lockhart a closet wall where all the past doctors and employees have put their locker name tags. Amongst them, the tag "Lewis" can be seen.

In the series finale titled "And in the End...", Lewis returns to Chicago for the opening of The Carter Center. During evening drinks with Peter Benton, John Carter, Kerry Weaver, Elizabeth Corday, and Rachel Greene, Susan is heard confirming to Dr. Corday that she still lives in Iowa. Additionally, she states that she and Chuck have split, and she is now dating again.

She eventually returns to the ER one final time with Rachel Greene and Carter, where she visits and jokes with the staff, much to the annoyance of Dr. Banfield, who interrupts the conversation by asking Susan who she is.

Other offices
Preceded by Robert Romano	Chief of Emergency Medicine; 2004–2005	Succeeded by Luka Kovač

== Reception ==
Sherry Stringfield's decision to leave ER sent a "shock wave through Hollywood." According to Entertainment Weekly, people called Stringfield "nuts" for leaving "the hottest show on TV for some investment banker in New York."
