= Luka Kovač =

Fictional physician on television show ER

- Goran Višnjić as Luka Kovač
- First appearance: September 30, 1999 (6x01, "Leave It to Weaver")
- Last appearance: October 16, 2008 (15x03, "The Book of Abby")
- Portrayed by: Goran Višnjić
- Duration: 1999–2008

In-universe information
- Gender: Male
- Title(s): Locum Tenens (1999); Attending Physician (1999–2007); Chief of Emergency Medicine (2005–2007); Hospice Physician (2007–2008)
- Occupation: Physician
- Family: Josip Kovač (father, deceased); Niko Kovač (younger brother)
- Spouses: Danijela Kovač (wife, deceased); Abby Lockhart (wife)
- Significant other: Sam Taggart (ex-girlfriend)
- Children: Jasna Kovač (daughter with Danijela, deceased); Marko Kovač (son with Danijela, deceased); Josip "Joe" Kovač (son with Abby, born on May 18, 2006)
- Religion: Roman Catholic
- Nationality: (Croatia) Croat

Luka Kovač is a fictional character from the NBC television series ER. The role was portrayed by Goran Višnjić from the sixth season episode, "Leave It to Weaver", which aired on September 30, 1999 until the thirteenth season episode, "The Honeymoon Is Over", which aired on May 17, 2007.

Višnjić appeared as a guest in seven episodes during the fourteenth season of the show, beginning with "Under the Influence" on October 25, 2007 and concluding with "The Chicago Way" on May 15, 2008. He returned to the show's fifteenth and final season for another guest appearance in "The Book of Abby", which aired on October 16, 2008.

Luka Kovač is an emergency room attending physician from Croatia. He speaks of having a joyful, though financially modest, childhood, with at least one brother, and he keeps in contact with his father, who is an amateur painter and engineer working in Croatian Railways in Zagreb. Luka served in the Yugoslav army (at the time of Luka's potential conscription, no Croatian army existed), and saw combat. He was a family man, with a wife (Danijela), son (Marko), and daughter (Jasna). Jasna was his older child, and from a birthday photo we know she was at least four.

When the Croatian War of Independence (1991–1995) breaks out, Luka is living in Vukovar and is at first hesitant to move away, as he wants to finish his internship. He ends up waiting too long, and it becomes unsafe to leave. While he is out in a morning, a bombardment occurs, and his apartment building is hit by a mortar shell. His son died instantly. His wife and daughter died a few hours later. He carries guilt from the incident because he could have carried his wife to a hospital and saved her, but instead he chose to stay and perform CPR on his daughter (which failed), while his wife bled to death.

He moves to the United States of America some time after that for a fresh start, but evidence he suffered from both survivor's guilt and PTSD soon emerge, largely in terms of his personal relationships. Although initially reluctant to settle in one place, preferring to travel between Chicago and an unnamed southern city in his boat, a job offer from Kerry Weaver leads him to take a permanent position at County General. This becomes the first of several significant decisions Luka makes that are in part influenced by the relationships in his life.

== Relationships ==
Luka has been in two serious relationships since he settled in Chicago. Soon after arriving at County General he and then-pregnant Head Nurse Carol Hathaway struck up a mutual interest, although their relationship was largely as friends. For Luka, Carol was a tentative first attempt at romance, albeit with a woman much like his own wife, and for Carol, it was a step toward the next phase of her life. After her twins were born, a kiss between Luka and Carol served as an epiphany for Carol and she left Chicago for Seattle to be with her true love, and the father of her children, Dr. Doug Ross. While involved with Carol, Luka met and began teaching medical student Nurse Abby Lockhart, who would eventually become the longest and most important relationship in his new life. Luka recognized the potential to be a good doctor in her, and began to mentor and encourage her when her personal life led to her withdrawal from medical school.

It was this support, along with the loss of Carol, that sparked Luka's next relationship. Early into Season 7, Luka became involved with Abby, now an ER nurse, after a spontaneous kiss led him to reconsider his relationship with her. It was a relationship marked by trouble from their very first date, when they were mugged and Luka unintentionally killed their assailant in self-defense. They fell into a sexual and romantic connection after the mugging, with hesitation evident on both sides, although for a time they were happy. An encounter with a dying bishop provided Luka with a measure of absolution for the death of his wife, and for a time, he seemed ready to move forward. However, the repeated appearances of Abby's troubled mother, along with the continuous interference by Dr. John Carter, who Abby turned to as an enabler, was too much for the fragile relationship and resulted in a break-up after a year together.

Although the breakup was acrimonious, Luka remained quite protective of her (especially after she was attacked by her neighbor). Over the next few years, he and Abby slowly forged a close friendship. The break-up affected Luka deeply, however, and he then went through a long period where he was unable to form a satisfactory relationship. He has many demons and tends to be emotionally reclusive and, for a short time, used sex to drown his problems. He had a series of brief flings, before developing an unorthodox relationship with a prostitute who seemed to serve more as a psychotherapist. An affair between Luka and nurse Chuny Marquez ended badly in Season 9 and resulted in Luka being briefly suspended for unprofessional conduct. He rebuffed a series of advances by medical student Erin Harkins (Leslie Bibb) before making a drunken pass after a painful encounter with Abby. Harkins was seriously injured in a car accident the next day, when he drove exhausted and angry in his Dodge Viper. As a result of this, Luka's PTSD and depression led him to ask for a short leave from the hospital. When Kerry brusquely refused, he went AWOL from County and returned just before Kerry was going to officially fire him. Despite his depression, he was able to save a boy's life using an unorthodox method, and was allowed to stay on condition he undergo counseling, with which he was minimally cooperative. The combination of guilt over his mistakes at the hospital, survivor's guilt and PTSD eventually led him to take a high-risk assignment in Africa with the organization Alliance Medicines.

When Carter returned to the United States, Luka stayed behind, working at a rural clinic in the Congo, until he contracted malaria. Despite the symptoms, he helped evacuate patients during a rebel attack. However, he was captured by the rebels two days later, along with his surviving patients and co-workers. As the prisoners were dragged one by one to their execution, Luka kneeled and began praying (in Croatian) for the first time in years. Though the rebels at first objected and pointed their guns at him, their leader noticed a small cross hanging around Luka's neck, given to him by the mother of a young patient. Thinking Luka was a priest, the rebels knelt around him and joined him in prayer, releasing him the next day along with three of his surviving patients. Carter, having returned to Africa because County had been told Luka was killed (his I.D. had been found in the burned-down clinic), found Luka half-dead from the malaria in a refugee camp. Opting to stay in the Congo for a while, Carter sent Luka back to County on his return flight.

On his return from Africa, Luka began a relationship with Nurse Samantha Taggart, and for about a year and a half all seemed fairly well until he expressed his desire to have more children. Sam already had a son, Alex, whom she clearly loved very much, but declared, with absolute conviction, that she was completely done with having children. Sam and Luka eventually became frustrated over their inability to communicate with each other (Luka with Sam keeping things from him, and Sam with Luka's unwillingness to discuss his past or acknowledge their relationship had problems) which resulted in Sam and Alex moving out. Their break-up, though somewhat rough, ultimately resolved amicably. One consequence, though, is that Luka's involvement with Alex was very limited. However, as with most people he meets who have suffered great hardships, Luka continued to act protective around Sam and Alex.

Luka then began seeing Abby Lockhart (Maura Tierney) again after an argument that turned into a kiss and an overnight affair. Abby became pregnant by Luka from this encounter and they debated whether to have the baby because of her family's history of bipolar disorder. Luka left the decision to her, but a few days later she told him she wanted to keep it. Although they still kept both their apartments and did not become engaged (Abby being leery of marriage since her first was a disaster), they began living together and were finally happy.

Luka was a committed physician, and considered one of the more approachable attendings. He also was a supporter of world health, and more than once donated his services to the Doctors Without Borders program, coming close to death on one occasion. Though once a man of faith, Luka has struggled with his religious beliefs. Such doubts arose after the death of his family. While treating Bishop Lionel Stewart (portrayed by James Cromwell), he seemed to come to terms with his bitterness, although he still wrestles with what God is and isn't responsible for. As an Attending, he is generally a patient teacher to residents and medical students, though his commitment to teaching sometimes frustrates nurses who are needed to dash from patient to patient.

He and Dr. John Carter once had a strong rivalry arising from their feelings of attraction to Abby - to the point that a fencing match in "Secrets and Lies" resulted in both of them drawing blood - but their shared experiences in the Congo, as well as the death of Carter's unborn son, made them understand each other better, and they became true friends. It is said in Season 12 that they kept in contact with each other while Carter was still in Africa. It is likely that they stayed in touch up to Season 15, as Carter was aware that Abby and Luka moved to Boston.

Following the departure of Dr Susan Lewis, Luka was made Chief of Emergency Medicine in Season 12, by an initially reluctant Kerry Weaver. His competition was the new Attending, a brilliant but unstable doctor named Victor Clemente. Luka and Clemente had locked horns even before they were competing for the job. The two of them remained hostile for a while, but gradually mended fences. Nonetheless, Clemente's personal issues (including being suspected of shooting his girlfriend, and insomnia developed from being stalked by her ex-husband) forced Luka to admit him for PTSD near the end of Season 12 and fire him. Kerry Weaver initially blamed Luka for the havoc Clemente caused on his watch. However, when she realized the board wanted to fire Luka at the start of Season 13, she admitted she had kept him on staff against Luka's wishes for months, saving his career and getting herself demoted to an Attending. Luka was later forced to consider firing her (which raised protest from many of the staff, including Abby) but he found a way to keep her on staff. Ultimately, Kerry resigned anyway about halfway through the season and sought a new career in Florida, parting on good terms with Luka.

In "Twenty-One Guns", the season 12 finale, Kovač is injected with a paralytic medication during an escape attempt by Sam's jailed ex-husband. Because he was unable to breathe independently for some time and could have died, Sam forced her captors to let her intubate him before they took her from the hospital. Luka awoke an hour later with the tube still in his throat, strapped to the gurney. In the following shootout, he watches helplessly from another room as the heavily pregnant Abby falls to the ground from internal injuries she sustained.

In the season 13 premiere, "Bloodline", Kovač was rescued by Weaver, only to learn that Abby sustained possibly serious injuries as a result of the shootout. Luka accompanies Abby as she is taken up to OB where it is discovered that she will need to have a caesarean section, complications during which led to Abby also having a hysterectomy. The baby (whom Abby and Luka decide to name Josip, after Luka's father, but call "Joe", because Abby's father was a fan of boxer Joe Frazier) was born prematurely; consequently, he had underdeveloped lungs and several other serious problems. After several tense weeks and emergency surgery, a healthy Joe was released from the hospital, and Luka and Abby settled into parenthood. Soon after returning to work, Luka had to defend himself in a malpractice suit brought by Curtis Ames (played by Forest Whitaker), a carpenter who suffered a debilitating stroke while under Kovač's care for pneumonia. Luka won the case, but he and Abby were stalked for months by a vengeful Ames. The situation came to a climax when Ames took Luka hostage, subjected him to a night of mental and physical torture (by crushing Kovač's hand in a vise), and shot himself to death, on a rooftop, in front of the horrified doctor, as police surrounded them. Later, Abby asks him to propose to her, and he does. Luka suggests they keep their engagement a secret, to which Abby agrees, but the staff soon finds out.

Once their secret is out, Luka realizes that planning their wedding is stressing Abby out, so he takes action. In the episode "I Don't," Luka prepares a surprise wedding for Abby, and then convinces her to marry him then and there. The night before they are due to depart for their honeymoon, however, he receives a call from Croatia informing him that his father is ill, so the honeymoon is postponed, while Luka makes an urgent trip to his native country. He is gone much longer than expected (six months), and Abby struggles to keep their lives in Chicago together while Luka is away. When Kovač returns home he is happy to see Joe and Abby. News soon arrived that his father died in Croatia. While preparing to return to Croatia, Abby tells him that she has relapsed but does not tell him that she slept with another doctor while she was drunk and blacked out. While Abby seeks help for her alcoholism, Luka and Joe return to Croatia for his father's funeral. While Abby is in rehab, Luka briefly returns to Chicago to visit her, at which time he quit his job at County. Upon her release from rehab, Abby joins him, and tells him about her alcohol induced infidelity. They return to the US soon after, and Luka struggles with forgiving Abby’s mistakes. He tries to decide what to do about his marriage, ignoring Abby's remorse and attempts to work on their problems in a completely uncharacteristic way. Luka moves out of their home, though he does not seek legal separation or consider divorce. He takes a position as a doctor in a small hospice voicing a desire to do some good. There he meets an elderly man who teaches (or maybe reminds him of) some lessons about life and forgiveness, and in the Season 14 finale, Luka forgives Abby after first confronting Kevin Moretti. Luka tells Abby that he finally realized that marriage isn’t something static and concrete, it’s something you fight for and work on. As long as they love each other (using a metaphor about rowing a boat), they’ll be okay. He suggests to Abby that they leave Chicago, and they decide to go.

During the 15th and final season of ER, at the end of the episode "The Book of Abby", long-serving nurse Haleh Adams shows the departing Abby Lockhart a closet wall where all the past doctors and employees have put their locker name tags. Abby then adds both her and Luka's locker name tags to the wall. Kovač's final appearance in the series came late in the episode, when he comes to pick up Abby before they leave for Boston. They embraced each other with a kiss and gave a final goodbye to their friends at County, a scene echoing the Season 6 episode where Carol leaves him to join Doug in a kiss after telling Luka he would find the right woman some day. Luka is not seen again in the series, but Abby indicates in a phone call to Neela that the three of them are settling in well in Boston.

== Legacy ==
Luka Kovač became famous in Croatia for his depiction of Croats and the Siege of Vukovar (portrayed in "The Crossing"), as well as Višnjić's lines in Croatian language: recital of Hamlet's soliloquy "To be, or not to be" as well as for his recital of Our Father in "The Lost" episode. Višnjić himself named the character: name Luka in honour of his nephew, and surname Kovač of his best friend.

Other offices
Preceded by Susan Lewis	Chief of Emergency Medicine; 2005–2007	Succeeded by Kevin Moretti
