= Abby Lockhart =

Fictional character from ER

- Maura Tierney as Abby Lockhart
- First appearance: November 25, 1999 (6x08, "Great Expectations")
- Last appearance: March 19, 2009 (15x20, "Shifting Equilibrium")
- Portrayed by: Maura Tierney
- Duration: 1999, 2000–08, 2009

In-universe information
- Gender: Female
- Title(s): Medical Student (2000, 2003–2004); Intern (2004–2005); Resident (2005–2008); Attending Physician (2008)
- Occupation: OB/GYN Nurse (1999–2000); ER Nurse (2000–2002); Nurse manager (2002–2004); Physician (2004–2008)
- Family: Eddie Wyczenski (father); Maggie Wyczenski (mother); Eric Wyczenski (younger brother)
- Spouses: Richard Lockhart (ex-husband); Luka Kovač (husband)
- Significant others: John Carter (ex-boyfriend); Jake Scanlon (ex-boyfriend)
- Children: Josip "Joe" Kovač (son with Luka, born on May 18, 2006)
- Born: February 20, 1968

Abigail Marjorie Lockhart, M.D. (née Wyczenski) is a fictional character from the NBC medical drama series ER, portrayed by Maura Tierney. She first appears as a guest star in the first half of the sixth season, before becoming a main character later that season, appearing until the beginning of the fifteenth season. Tierney returned to make one final guest appearance later in season fifteen.

== Beginnings ==
The character Abby Lockhart first appears in season 6 of ER in the episode "Great Expectations", guest starring as Carol Hathaway's (Julianna Margulies) labor and delivery nurse. Three months later, she became a regular character. She first made an appearance in February 2000 as a third-year medical student beginning her ER rotation.

On her first day, she meets Dr. Luka Kovač (Goran Visnjic), her first teacher, with whom she will experience both a professional and personal relationship, and who will become the most important character in her long-running story. Lockhart's first months in the ER prove challenging for her, transitioning from OB nursing, to the ER. In that time, she sees Carter stabbed, and a medical student, Lucy Knight killed by a patient with schizophrenia. She also has had to speak to superiors Kerry Weaver (Laura Innes) and Mark Greene (Anthony Edwards) about John Carter's (Noah Wyle) growing drug addiction. Although Carter is hostile at first, he and Abby become friends over the course of the next season.

Abby dates Dr. Kovač, Dr. Carter and Jake, a medical student, but eventually reunites with Kovač, with whom she has a son. They later marry. She befriends many colleagues in the ER throughout the series, co-workers such as Susan Lewis, and Kerry Weaver. Her closest friend is Dr. Neela Rasgotra, who graduates medical school with her and lives with her during some of Neela's hard times. As Carter is phased out of the show and Weaver departs midway through Season 13, Abby and Luka Kovač are the senior figures on the show until their departure in October 2008.

== Personal life ==
Prior to beginning medical school at County, Abby was married to Richard Lockhart; she and Richard were expecting a child at one point, but Abby chose to have an abortion, since she was afraid the child would have bipolar disorder like her mother. Abby never told her family about the pregnancy and Richard was unaware of it until after the abortion. The marriage began to break down after a short time, with Richard frustrated at Abby's abortion and depression, and Abby angry over his insensitivity, since she was working overtime at home and at work to help pay for his medical schooling.

Soon after taking the position in the ER, Abby begins a relationship with Dr. Luka Kovač, who is initially a mentor figure to her until she has to quit medical school. The beginning of their relationship is strained when they are attacked by a mugger on their first date, whom Luka kills in defense. She and Luka stay together for about a year, but their relationship becomes more strained after the arrival of Abby's mother and the increasing closeness between Abby and Dr. John Carter, and a heated argument leads to their break up at the beginning of the eighth season.

== Career as a doctor ==
In 2003, Abby starts her final year of medical school and newcomer Samantha Taggart replaces her as the central nurse character on the show. As both a nurse and later a doctor, Abby has a tendency for sarcasm towards troublesome patients (and her co-workers), but she exudes gentleness and security as well. Although she is not as intellectually gifted as Neela Rasgotra, John Carter, or Gregg Pratt, she has many years of experience and one of the highest patient-satisfaction scores.

After leaving with Luka to work in Boston, Abby appears once more in season 15 episode 20, "Shifting Equilibrium", during a phone call with Neela, who needs Abby's encouragement to leave County. Abby is seen in her new home looking after a group of young children for her after-shift daycare, including a three-year-old Joe.
