= Greater Chicago Food Depository =

American nonprofit organization

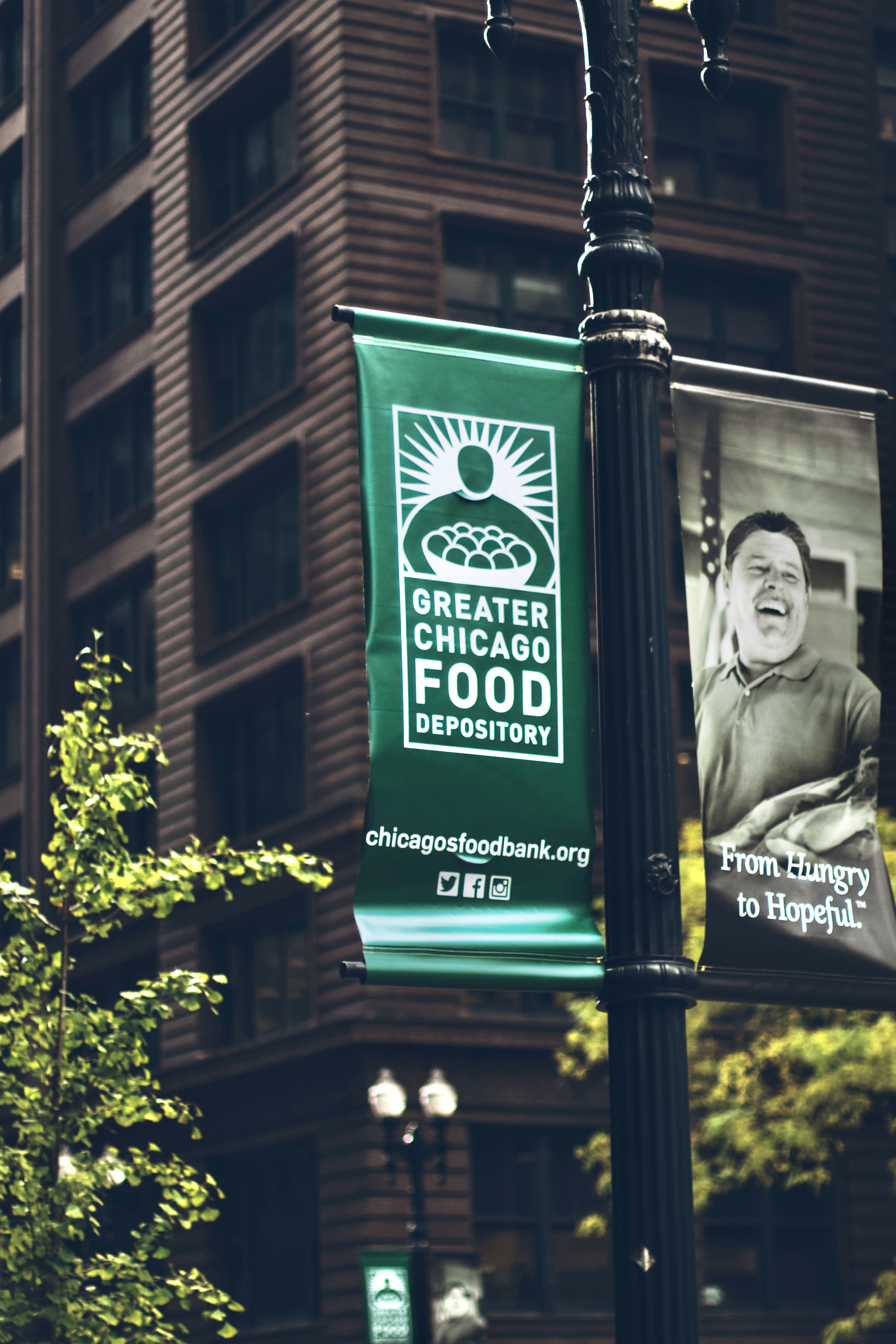
- Formation: 1979
- Type: Non-profit
- Legal status: 501(c)(3)
- Headquarters: 4100 W Ann Lurie Pl. Chicago, Illinois 60632; United States
- Region served: Cook County
- Members: 700 pantries, soup kitchens and shelters
- Executive Director: Kate R. Maehr
- Main organ: Board of Directors
- Revenue: $106,149,642 (2016)
- Expenses: $96,883,955 (2016)
- Website: www.chicagosfoodbank.org

The Greater Chicago Food Depository (GCFD) is a nonprofit organization that fights hunger throughout Cook County, Illinois. The GCFD distributes donated and purchased food through a network of 700 food pantries, soup kitchens, shelters and community programs, serving more than 800,000 adults and children every year. In fiscal year 2016, the GCFD distributed more than 70 million pounds of nonperishable food, produce, dairy products, and meat—the equivalent of more than 160,000 meals every day. Of the $96,883,955 spent in 2016, over 90% went to direct food distribution programs.

The GCFD is a charter member of Feeding America, the food bank network of the United States.

== History ==
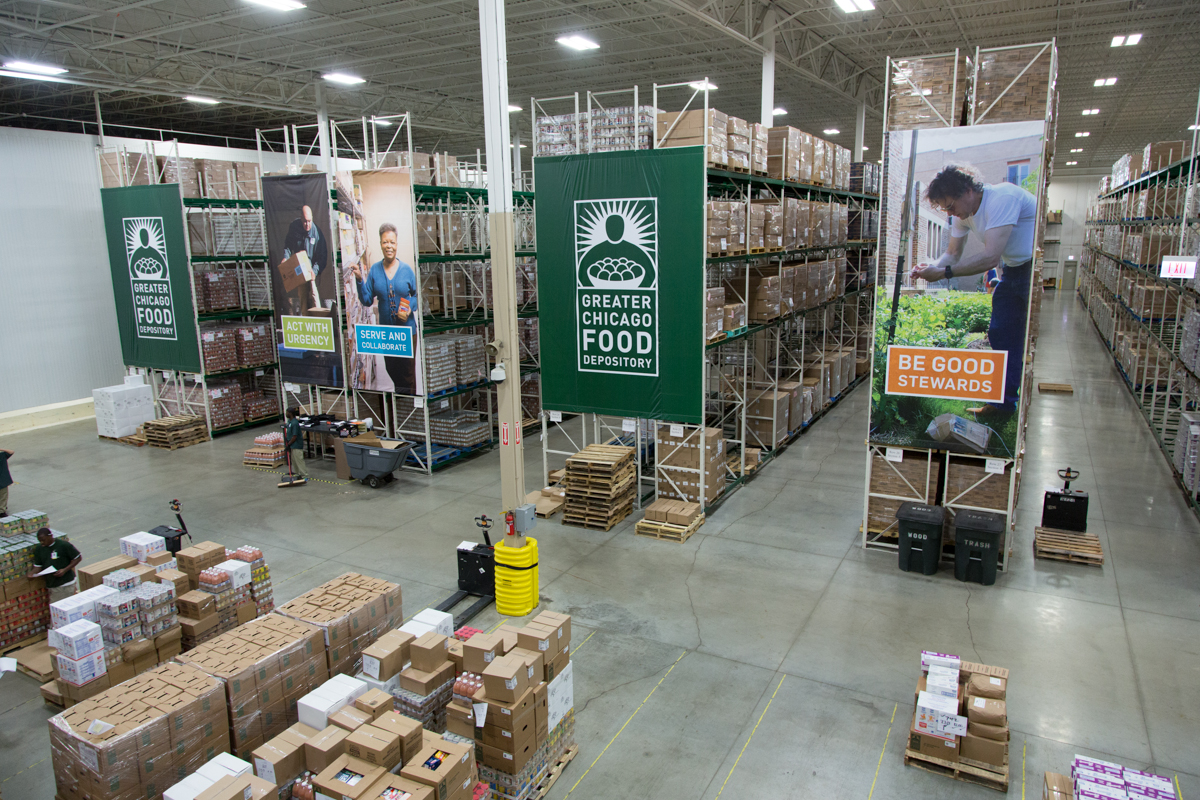
One of the Greater Chicago Food Depository's warehouses, which is located at 4100 W Ann Lurie PL in Chicago, Illinois

The Greater Chicago Food Depository was founded in 1979 by Tom O'Connell, Robert W. Strube Sr., Rev. Philip Marquard, Gertrude Snodgrass, Ann Connors and Ed Sunshine. Following an increase of poverty in the Chicago area, the six founders were inspired to start a food bank. They followed the example of John van Hengel, who started the nation's first food bank in Phoenix, Arizona. However, due to an Illinois statute that prohibited the use of the word 'bank' in the name of non-banking entities, the name 'depository' was chosen.

A year after incorporation, the Greater Chicago Food Depository opened their doors at the Chicago South Water Market. Major benefactors included the City of Chicago, which provided a start-up grant, as well as Strube Celery and Vegetable Company, which donated warehouse space. By the end of their first year, the GCFD distributed 471,000 pounds of food from 22 food donors to 85 agencies.

Food supply grew in 1981 when Illinois legislators passed a Good Samaritan law, which protected food contributors from legal liabilities. Within a year, food donors increased to 111, distribution to 6.1 million pounds and agencies to 375. The growing food bank settled in a 91,000-square-foot (8,454 m^{2}) facility at 4501 South Tripp Avenue in 1984.

In 1986, GCFD established a Perishable Food Program, now known as Food Rescue, with a grant from Chicago Community Trust. The program collected and distributed unused food from restaurants and caterers to soup kitchens. The depository further broadened its distribution in 1993 with new programs. The Produce People Share Program addressed the need for fresh fruits and vegetables in the community, and the first Kids Cafe began serving after-school hot meals for low-income children.

By 1998, GCFD's distribution topped 25 million pounds. In that same year, the food bank founded Chicago's Community Kitchens, a free 12-week culinary training program for unemployed and underemployed adults. In 2001, the first Producemobile, a farmers' market on wheels, began distributing fresh produce to low-income communities.

The GCFD acquired a new warehouse and training center, in 2004, which allowed them to double their food distribution capacity. The 268,000-square-foot (24,900 m^{2}) facility is located in Archer Heights, Chicago, and remains the headquarters of the GCFD today. In addition to increased storage space, the facility hosts administration and training programs like Pantry University, which began the same year.

== Organization structure ==
The Greater Chicago Food Depository is led by a Leadership Team, a Board of Directors, and an Associate Board. The Leadership Team consists of the CEO/Executive Director, Chief Marketing Officer, Vice President of Operations, Chief Financial Officer, Chief People Officer, Vice President of Community Impact, and the Vice President of Development. The Board of Directors is made up of local business leaders in a variety of industries. The Associate Board, launched in 2014, is led by two co-chairs. The board consists of more than 100 volunteer young business professionals interested in helping further the organization's mission. As of November 2017, there are 138 employees of the GCFD, as well as 23,594 volunteers. Administration costs are $5,680,478 annually, about 5% of total expenses.

== Programs ==
=== Producemobile ===
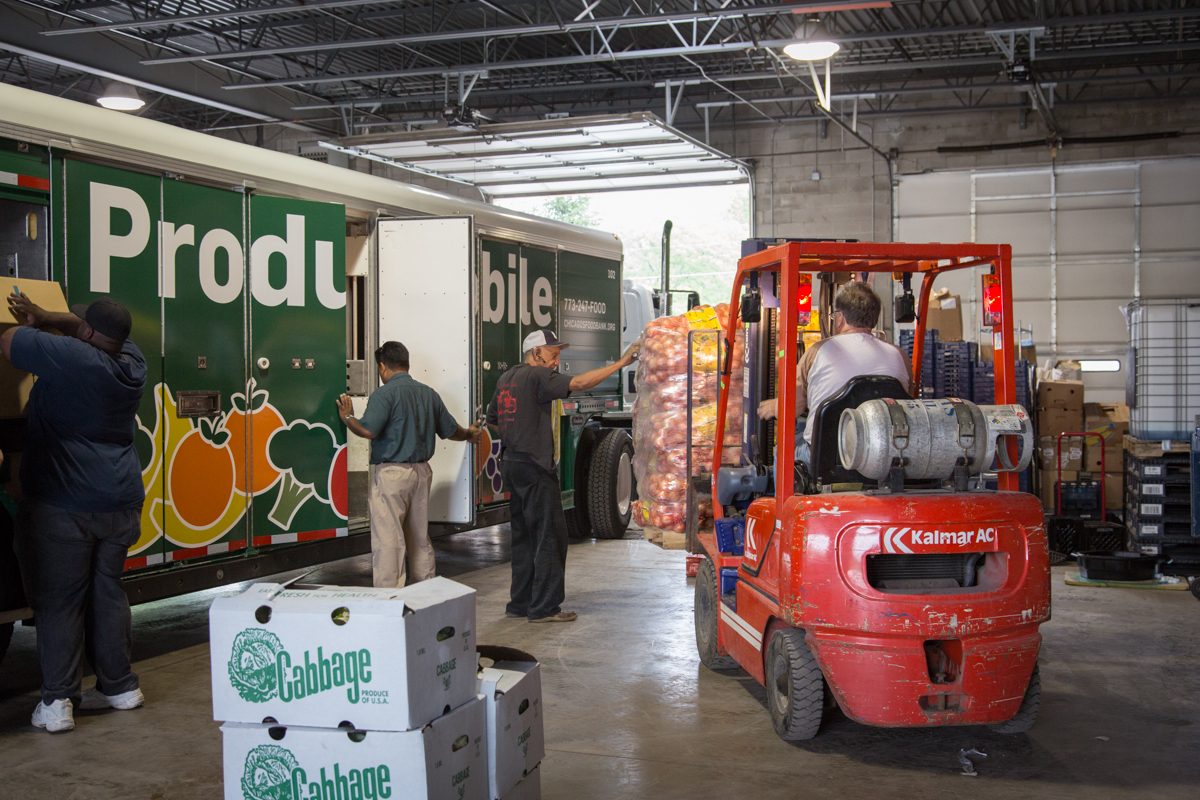
The Producemobile started in 2001 as a way to distribute fresh produce to neighborhoods in need.

In 2001, GCFD launched the Producemobile, a beverage-style truck that delivers donated food directly to individuals across Chicago on a weekly basis. Many of these individuals live in areas where produce is difficult or costly to obtain. A second Producemobile was added in 2005, and eventually made its way to Evanston.

=== Mobile Pantry ===
The Mobile Pantry program launched in 2007, and distributes food to more than twelve sites each month. The sites are in areas with high poverty levels and low food assistance from the GCFD, according to the 2006 Cook County Unmet Need Study. In addition, the program delivers food on evenings and weekends to provide assistance to more people.

=== Hunger Walk ===
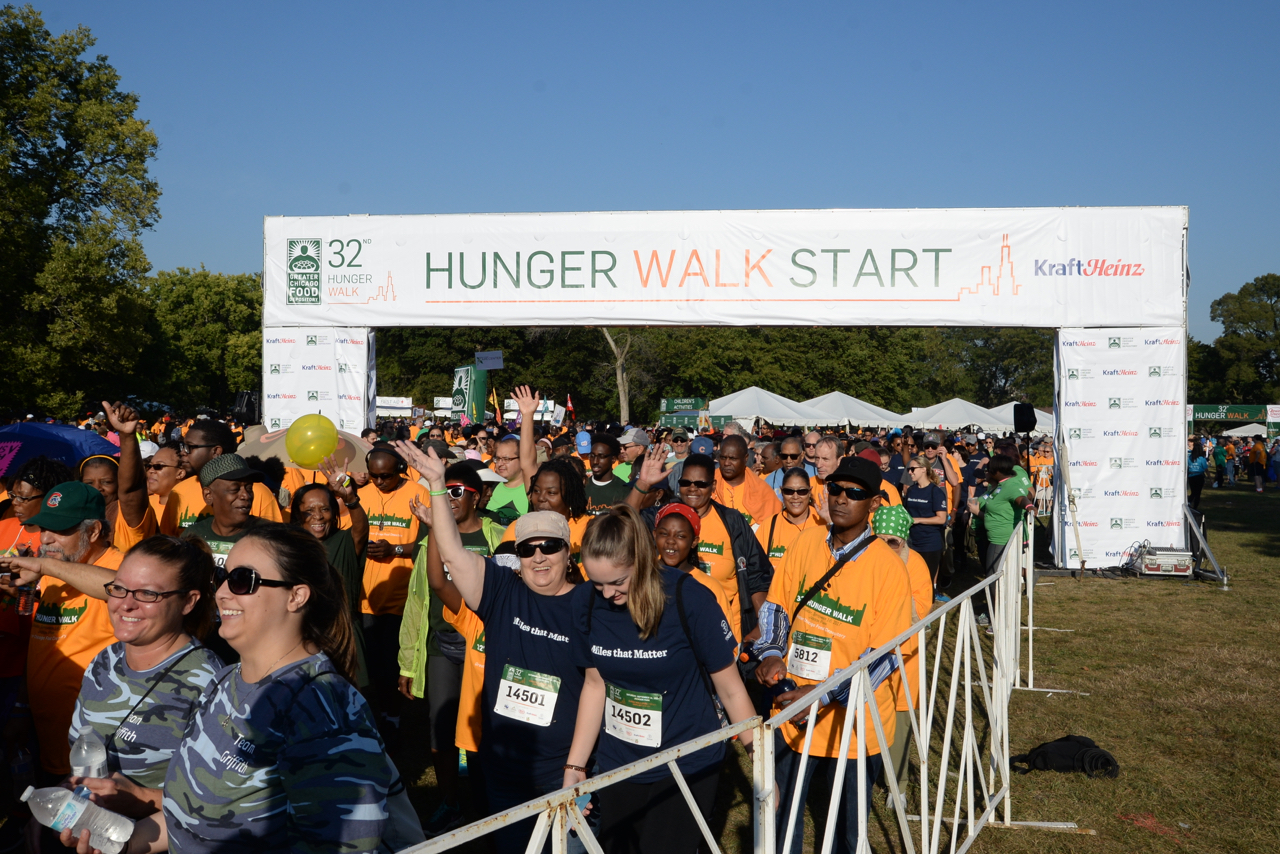
The Hunger Walk raises money and awareness for those who are struggling to get proper nourishment. The 32nd annual Hunger Walk took place on September 16th, 2017.

In 1985, the GCFD organized the Hunger Walk, an event which helps raise awareness on hunger and supports the GCFD. In 2017, it is reported that over 12,000 people participated in their 32nd annual Hunger Walk in Chicago's Jackson Park. The Hunger Walk spans 2 miles, and through the revenue from this event, GCFD could fund some of their partner agencies for an entire year.

=== Food Rescue ===
Since 1987, the GCFD's Food Rescue program has been recovering prepared and perishable foods, such as meats, dairy products, baked goods and produce, that might otherwise have been wasted. Using refrigerated trucks, Food Rescue drivers—who are state-certified in food handling and sanitation—collect surplus foods at grocery stores, restaurants, food catering businesses, and cafeterias. These donations are then delivered to a network of over 700 pantries, soup kitchens, and shelters like Onward Neighborhood House, Care for Friends, and Nourishing Hope.

=== Kids Cafe ===
The Kids Cafe program is a national initiative of Feeding America and administered locally by the GCFD. Since 1993, the Food Depository's Kids Cafes have partnered with after-school programs to provide hot meals, tutoring, and other educational programs for children. The Food Depository has launched 44 Kids Cafes, serving more than 2,500 children each day.

=== Older Adult Program ===
The GCFD's Older Adult Program was formally launched, in May 2006, to address the needs of low-income seniors. The program delivers fresh produce to seniors at 80 Chicago Housing Authority complexes, U.S. Department of Housing and Urban Development sites, and other locations in Cook County. Of the 812,000 people who rely on food from the Food Depository and its network of member agencies every year, 18 percent are older adults.

=== Veterans' programs ===
The GCFD serves hundreds of veterans on a weekly basis, estimated between 125 and 175 veterans. The GCFD has two pantries specifically used to serve veterans, located at the VA Hospitals in Cook County at Jesse Brown and at Hines. Combined, both pantries have been able to provide assistance to about 88,000 veterans. In addition to food, GCFD provides veterans with other necessities such as long underwear, socks, bags and sleeping bags.

=== Lunch Bus ===
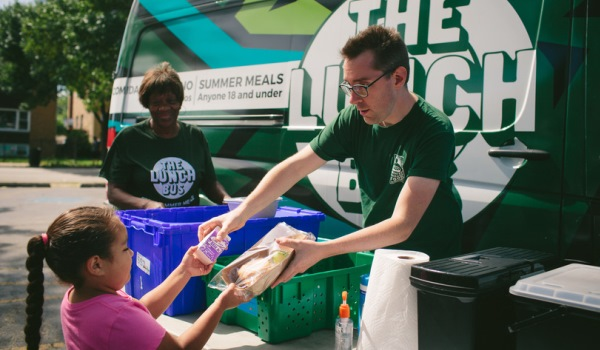
The Lunch Bus delivers food to children who are eligible for free or reduced lunches throughout the school year and during the summer.

The GCFD's lunch bus initiative provides food to children, who are eligible for free or reduce price meals at school, throughout the school year and summer. There are a total of 4 lunch buses with 24 stops from the Little Village to South Holland neighborhoods. The lunch buses serve children sandwiches and milk, both during the school year and the summer.

=== Fresh Truck ===
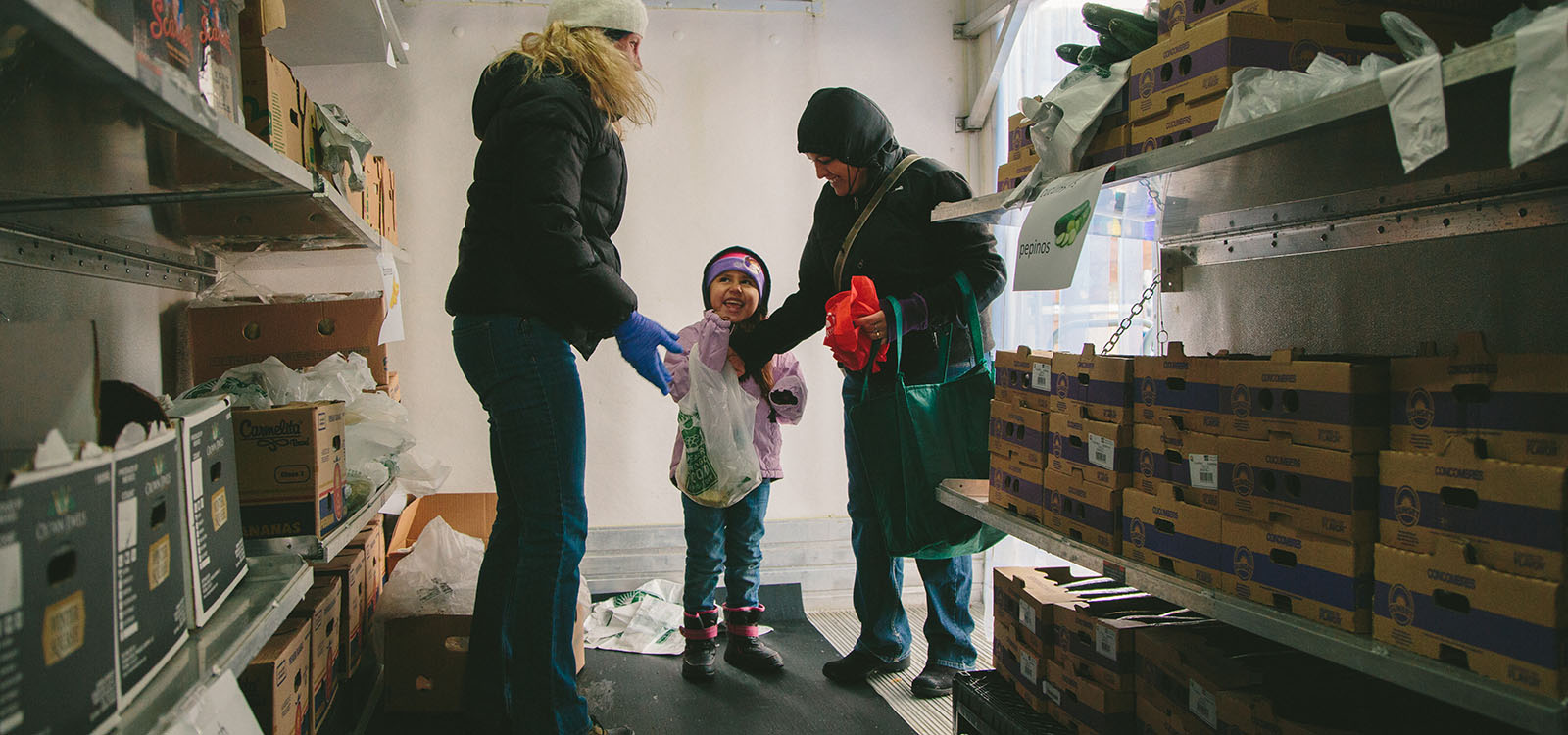
The Fresh Truck provides fresh produce to people who have food insecurity as a part of a partnership with the Cook County Health and Hospitals System.

The Fresh Truck is a mobile program started by the GCFD and the Cook County Health and Hospitals System in 2015. It began, as a test program, as a way of providing healthy foods to people who are unable to get enough in their diet due to location and/or resources. Doctors, at hospitals, write people, who need more healthy nutrients in their diets, "prescriptions" which they can then take down to the fresh truck and redeem for fresh fruits and vegetables. This service is also available to the general public at certain times, when people able to go and obtain fresh fruits and vegetables from the fresh truck regardless of prescription.

== Education and training ==
=== Chicago's Community Kitchens ===
Founded in 1998, Chicago's Community Kitchens is a free, 14-week culinary training program for people with barriers to employment like arrest records or lack of work history. The program, located at the GCFD, prepares students for a career in food service by providing them with a solid foundation in food preparation. Students spend the first 12 weeks training and the final two weeks working, as an intern, at a professional kitchen. The program has a 90% job placement rate, and graduates have been able to land jobs in some of Chicago's top restaurants. GCFD has also assisted students with transportation while they are enrolled in the program.

== Partnerships ==
The GCFD is sustained, in part, by a variety of corporate sponsorship. In particular, many Chicago metropolitan area food suppliers provide direct donations to the GCFD. Companies that have donated or donate to the GCFD include Starbucks, Buddig & Company, Tyson Foods, Jewel-Osco, Smithfield Foods and Gotham Greens. In addition, the GCFD has partnered with Cook County to find ways to curb food insecurity by providing fruits and vegetables to more than 760,000 affected residents.

== See also ==
- Food security
- List of food banks
- Non-profit organizations based in Chicago
