= Porch collapse =

Type of building collapse

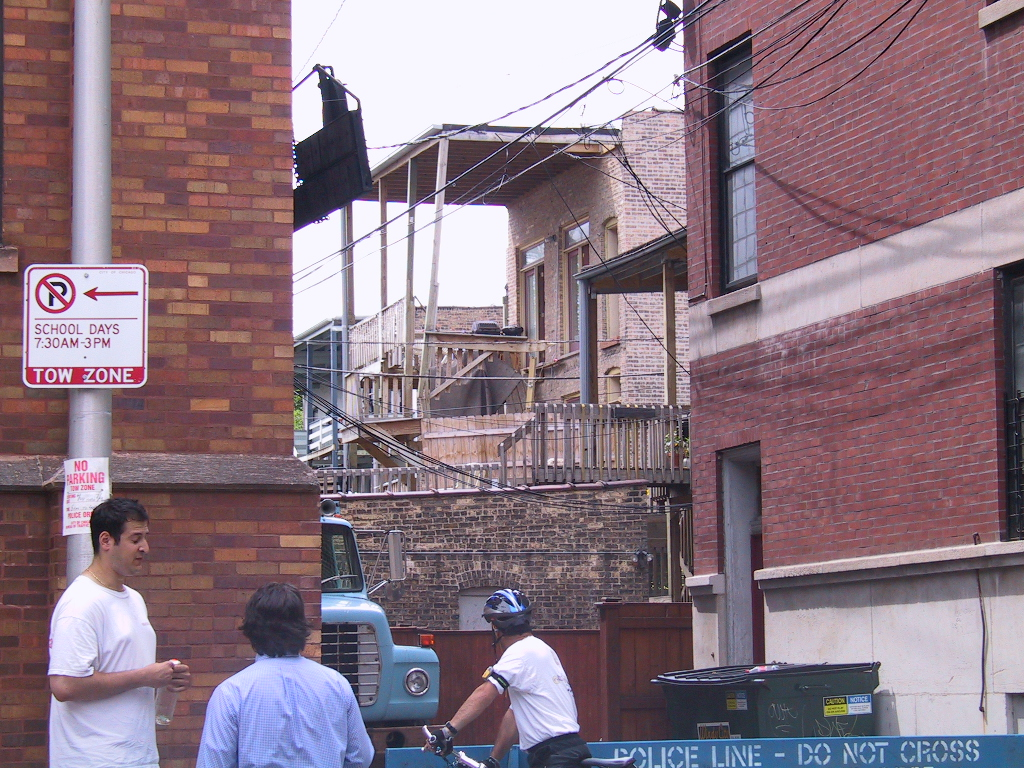
The balcony involved in the 2003 Chicago balcony collapse, the day after it failed

Porch collapse or balcony collapse is a phenomenon typically associated with older or poorly constructed multi-story apartment buildings that have wooden porch extensions on the front or rear of the building. The collapses have a number of causes, including overloading due to excessive weight from overoccupancy (too many people). Overoccupancy can result from guests filling a porch at a party, from people seeking cooler breezes during a heat wave, or from people filling a porch while seeking shelter from the rain. It may be from the weight of furniture/appliances, wading pools, or air conditioner compressors. After years of rain and snow, it may be from rotted wood, soil subsidence under the porch foundation, rust of nails and fasteners, and not being built to specifications required by modern-day building codes. Many older porches were built before codes required them to be able to support a legally mandated load of so many pounds per square foot or metre, and porches are often not as sturdily built as interior structures. The phenomenon is associated with older or poorly constructed multistory apartment buildings with wooden porches. Architect Stanley Tigerman said that in New York City one finds steel fire escapes, but in Chicago, the distance to alleys behind multistory brick buildings encouraged the construction of wooden multistorey porches.

While not an everyday occurrence, collapses happen often enough in Chicago that city building inspectors make a point of checking porches when making inspections. People have been killed and injured by collapses of wooden porches in other cities as well.

A Chicago porch collapse during a get-together in the Lincoln Park neighborhood in 2003 killed 13 people. The weight of approximately 70 people caused the recently renovated porch of the 1890s vintage building to fail. The disaster inspired a 2005 episode of the ER television show. In June 2008, a third-story balcony collapsed in Ottawa, injuring six persons.

== Deck collapse ==
A related hazard is the collapse of decks built as outdoor extensions of single-family homes. When decks became a popular feature, construction practice did not keep up with the new fashion, resulting in many decks that were simply nailed to the side of their houses. The inherently weak connections were prone to failure, resulting in collapse with injuries and occasional death. In recent years building codes have been re-written to require direct structural connection to the adjoining structure, as well as cross-bracing to withstand sway.

== High-rise apartments ==
High-rise apartment buildings are typically constructed from reinforced concrete. Many buildings have been designed with the concrete slab extending through the exterior walls to form balconies. Since they are relatively thin and unprotected from the weather, they are vulnerable to corrosion of reinforcing and potential collapse. Many buildings constructed in the 1950s and 1960s are undergoing repair or removal of such balcony structures at considerable cost.

== See also ==
- 2003 Chicago balcony collapse
- Berkeley balcony collapse
