= Jonquil Park =

Park in Chicago, Illinois

Coordinates: 41.9285°N 87.6546°W

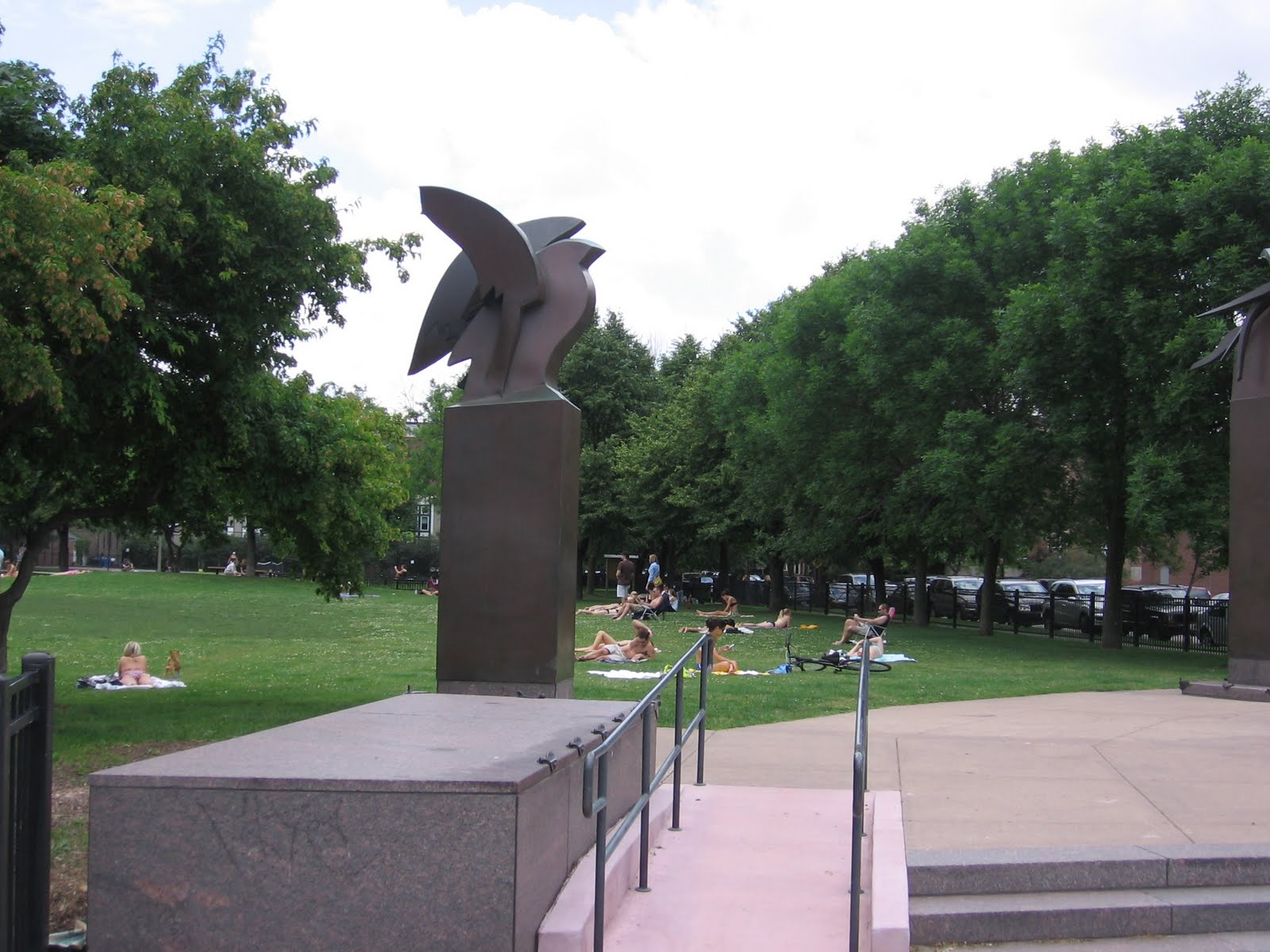
Jonquil Park, Chicago, Illinois.

Jonquil Park is a medium-sized public park of 3.25 acres located in the Lincoln Park neighborhood on the North Side of Chicago, Illinois. The park is situated at the intersection of West Wrightwood Avenue and North Sheffield Avenue, offering a green space and recreational area for local residents and visitors, including a public playground set with water toys for children, two tennis courts, a baseball field, and picnic tables with a chess board. The park sits at the northern end of Depaul University and is near the Fullerton "L" Station.

== History ==
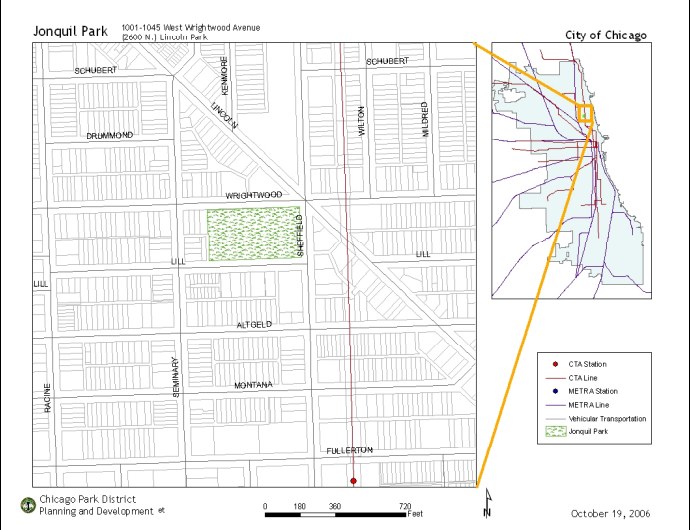
Chicago Park District Jonquil Park Location Schematic.

The park was established in the late 20th century as part of efforts to develop more local parks for Chicago's growing population, with planning drawings initiated in 1959 for "Park #1270". It is part of the larger Chicago Park District, which manages parks and public spaces throughout the city. In 1969, the Chicago Park District began leasing the grounds from the Chicago Transit Authority, which was using the land for snowplow storage. Additional land next to the storage grounds was purchased in 1981 to create the current size of Jonquil Park. The park is named after the Narcissus jonquilla flower which blooms in Illinois in the spring.

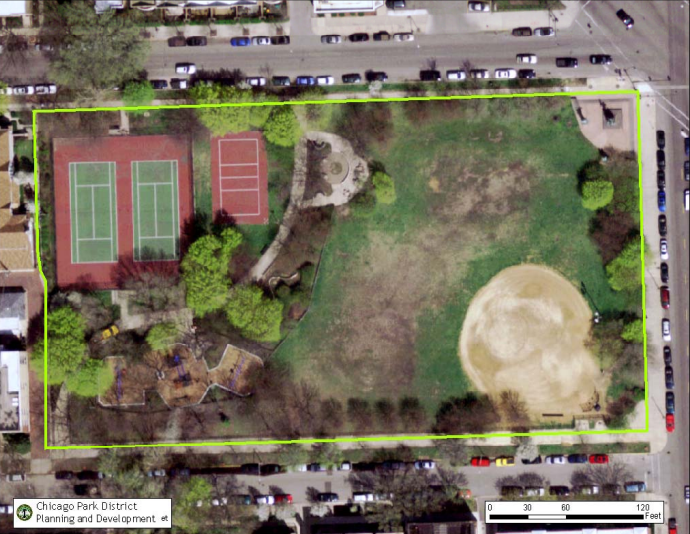
2006 Aerial of Jonquil Park.

The park previously had a volleyball court, botanic garden, and additional bench seating, but all were eventually removed in the 2010s. In 2026, the park received various upgrades, including updating the lighting to LED lights, a new backstop and dirt line for the baseball diamond, and upgrades to the playground surface and grass field.

The quality and maintenance of the park is handled by the Chicago Park District along with the volunteer community groups the Wrightwood Neighbors Association and the Jonquil Park Advisory Council. Jonquil Park sits in Chicago's 43rd ward.

== Features and amenities ==
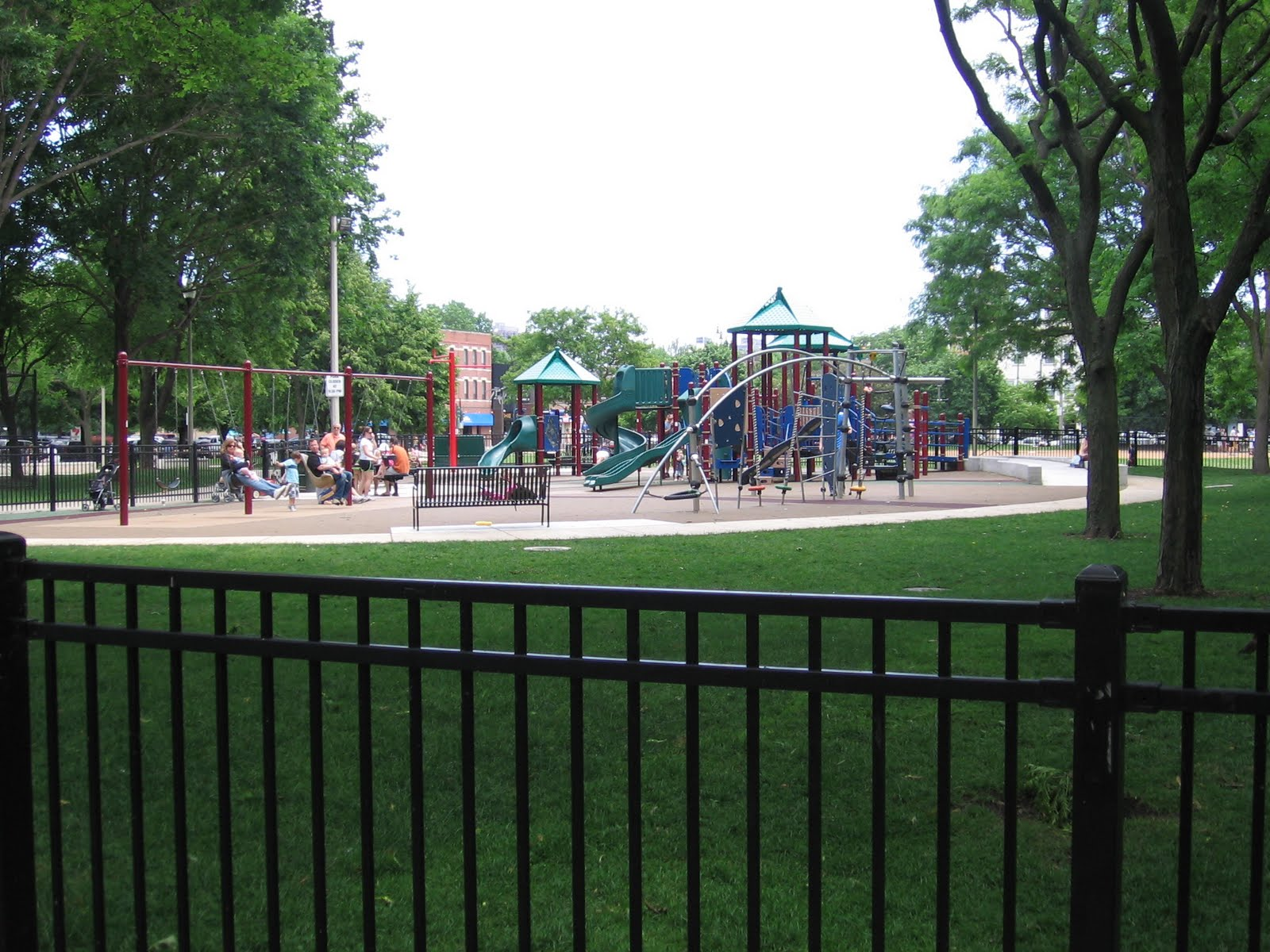
The playground at Jonquil Park.

Although relatively small, Jonquil Park offers a variety of amenities that make it a popular destination for families and individuals in the neighborhood. Current features of the park include:

- Playground: The park has an enclosed playground area with modern equipment suitable for children of different age groups, including handicap accessible swings, climbing structures, and a triple shower water sprayer turned on during the summer months. The playground was updated in 2009 and 2023.
- Baseball Field: The park has a baseball field utilized for pick-up games and structured leagues for various ages. The outfield doubles as an open green space for sunbathing, picnicking, casual sports, or dog walking.
- Walking Paths and Seated Areas: The park has several concrete paths cut through the park and encircle the playground and tennis courts, which include concrete picnic tables for resting and a public water fountain.
- Tennis Courts: The park has two tennis courts available for public play and scheduled lessons.

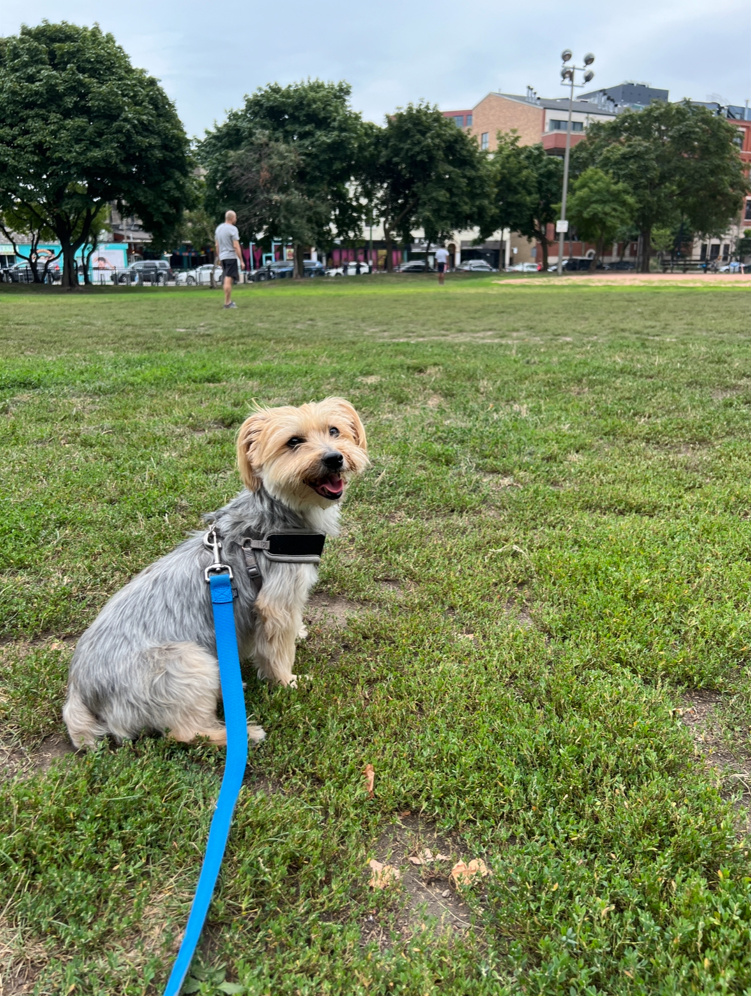
A dog enjoying Jonquil Park. The park's baseball field can be seen in the back right of the image.

The park is surrounded by private residences on its south and west sides, a 7-Eleven convenience store on its north side, and its east side faces a collection of retail businesses and restaurants across the street, including a Lou Malnati's pizza restaurant, a sports bar, a nail spa, a hair salon, and a cannabis dispensary. Park hours are 6AM to 11PM daily. The park is dog friendly for dogs on leashes; off leash dogs are welcome at the nearby Wiggly Field.

== Eagle Columns sculptures ==
The northeast corner of the park features three sculptures created in 1989 by Chicago native Richard Hunt, collectively entitled Eagle Columns. Hunt attended the School of the Art Institute of Chicago, and later lived and worked in a studio across the street from Jonquil Park before creating the sculptures. The bronze sculptures feature three abstract eagles rising from various height pylons, and a plaque memorializes two prominent Illinois citizens: Illinois governor John Peter Altgeld and poet Vachel Lindsay.

The three eagles allude to the pardon of three men convicted of murder for their role in the Haymarket Affair in Chicago, a seminal labor rights riot in 1886. Eight men were originally convicted for a bombing at the riot; soon after, one committed suicide and four were hung after being given the death penalty. Altgeld pardoned the remaining three individuals, calling them victims of mass hysteria and a biased judge, in what is now considered a notorious miscarriage of justice to criminal justice scholars based on the lack of evidence offered to prove the guilt of the eight men. Lindsay originally compared the pardons of the accused murderers to eagles in his poem "The Eagle That Is Forgotten", which is similarly dedicated to the accused and Altgeld. The description of the sculptural work by the Chicago Park District credits the poem for being the piece of literature that shifted public opinion in favor of Altgeld's forgiveness of the men. The riot is significant to both Illinois history and labor rights history around the world, as the event was considered the origin of International Workers' Day.

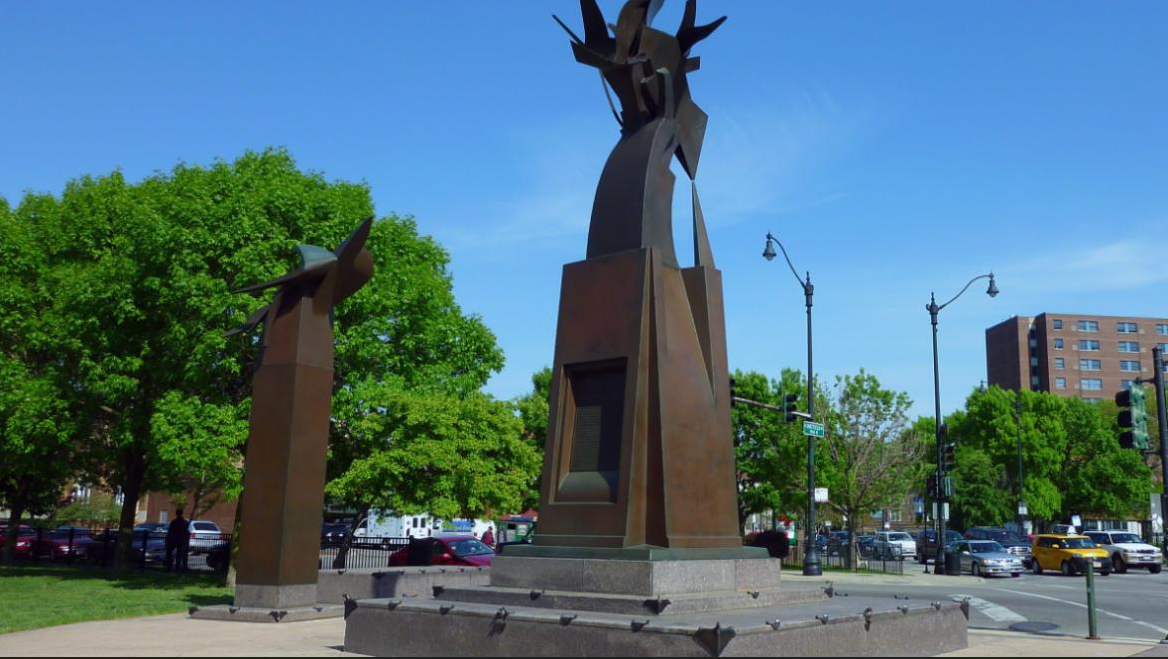
Eagle Columns by Richard Hunt.

== Community and events ==
Jonquil Park serves as a community hub for the Lincoln Park neighborhood, especially for families with young children. The Wrightwood Neighbors Association coordinates many events throughout the year that utilize the park grounds, including outdoor films, a craft beer festival, a wine tasting festival, and a family fun festival. The park's baseball field is also utilized for youth sports leagues and Chicago coed adult recreational sports leagues.
