= 2003 Chicago balcony collapse =

Deadliest porch collapse in U.S. history

Coordinates: 41.9288°N 87.6470°W

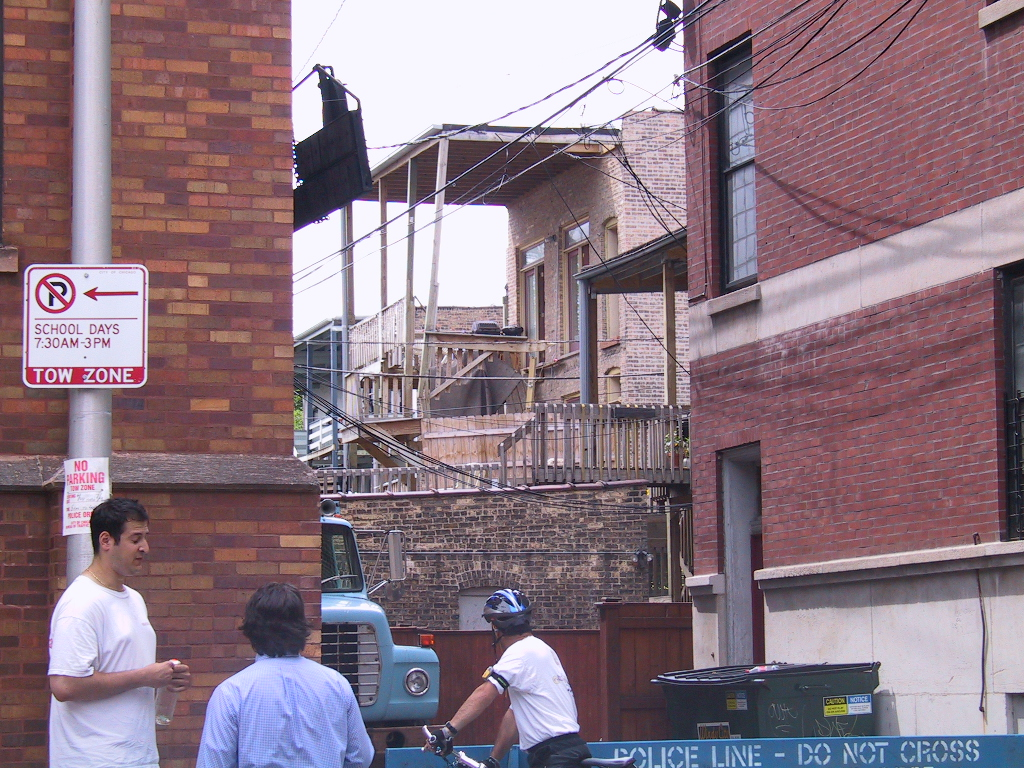
- The balcony, the day after it collapsed
- Date: June 29, 2003; 23 years ago
- Location: Lincoln Park, Chicago, Illinois, U.S.
- Type: Porch collapse
- Deaths: 13
- Injuries: 57

On June 29, 2003, an overloaded balcony collapsed during a party in a Chicago, Illinois, apartment building, killing thirteen people and seriously injuring fifty-seven others. It was the deadliest porch collapse in American history.

The ensuing investigation was highly critical of the way the balcony was built, finding a large number of errors in its construction which ultimately resulted in the collapse. However, the building's owner, LG Properties, and its president, Philip Pappas, blamed overcrowding on the balcony for its complete structural failure but took steps to strengthen the balconies at other properties to prevent a recurrence of the disaster. As part of such efforts, the balcony involved in the collapse was rebuilt.

The accident resulted in sweeping inspections of similar structures across Chicago, with 1,260 cases being acted on by the city authorities.

== Background ==
The porch was attached to the rear of an apartment building located in the Lincoln Park neighborhood of the city's North Side. The second and third floors were being used as a party venue at the time of the collapse. Most of the party-goers were in their early 20s, and knew each other from their days at New Trier High School and Lake Forest High School of Chicago's North Shore suburbs. One witness says she warned other people in the building that the balconies were unsafe, but another later said that "it looked like it was newly built. It looked sturdy."

== Collapse ==
About fifty people were on the top wooden balcony at the time of the collapse. According to one witness, the sound of splintering wood was heard immediately before the collapse, which occurred shortly after midnight. The collapse started on the third floor, pulling down other balconies below. The first, second, and third floor balconies all collapsed into the basement below, carrying a total of approximately one hundred people among them. Several people were also trapped in a basement stairwell. Survivors helped to pull victims out from under the debris of the balconies, and rescue workers had to use chainsaws to free others. One of the survivors was a nurse, and had started a rescue effort before emergency services arrived. The Chicago Fire Department supplied the main rescue effort. Eleven people were killed in the collapse, with two more subsequently dying while hospitalized; fifty-seven people were injured.

== Investigation ==
Initial inquiries suggested that the collapse was probably due to overcrowding. This was backed up by neighbors, who told authorities that the balconies were designed to hold only between twenty and thirty people. Chicago's fire chief said that "It appears to be a case of too many people in a small space." Norma Reyes, the city's building commissioner, said "I have no indication of any substandard problems or insufficiencies with the porch at this time. The buildings are not made for large assemblies and parties."

However, it was ultimately determined that poor construction was to blame. In 1998, a permit was issued to owner LG Properties to install furnaces, air conditioners and water heaters in the building, but not to build the balcony. The balcony jutted out 11 feet (3.4 m) from the building, 1 foot (30 cm) farther than permitted by city codes, and had an area of 231 square feet (21.5 m^{2}), 81 square feet (7.5 m^{2}) greater than permitted. The balcony also had inadequate supports, was floored with undersized lengths of wood, and was attached to the walls with screws that were too short. However, the City of Chicago's Inspectional Services Department visited the site over five times and never noticed or cited the code violations noted above.

== Aftermath ==
Three days after the disaster, the city sued the owners and managers of the building in the Housing Court due to a number of breaches in building regulations. Those named in the complaint included LG Properties, the company's president Philip Pappas, and George Koutroumos, the contractor who built the balcony. The city was reportedly seeking $500 per violation for each day the structure was in existence, totaling hundreds of thousands of dollars, and a court order for the replacement of the balcony. The apartment block was legally uninhabitable until the balconies were replaced, as the balconies had provided mandatory emergency exits. The city's Buildings Department inspected 42 other buildings owned or managed by Pappas and/or LG Properties for similar violations. The city also claimed that 21 other buildings owned by Pappas had similar problems. They did, however, note the fact that he had since made "dramatic improvements" to all 21 porches.

In the aftermath of the disaster, Chicago inspected a large number of similar structures to ensure they were safe, with 500 cases being turned over to the city's Law Department for court action, and 760 cases referred to administrative hearing officers.

Pappas continued to blame overcrowding for the disaster. An undercover press investigation discovered all his properties now display notices forbidding parties on the balconies. Pappas also claims that a police report says two unnamed witnesses informed a paramedic that they saw several people "jumping up and down" on the balconies shortly prior to the collapse.

In 2005, the city of Chicago filed a negligence lawsuit against two of the survivors, William Fenton-Hathaway and John Koranda. The city alleged that the balcony collapse occurred after defendants Fenton-Hathaway and Koranda "intentionally and negligently" began jumping up and down on the porch.

No criminal charges were filed and Pappas was fined a total of $108,000 as a result of the collapse. Twenty-seven families sued Pappas and the city over the accident. The balcony was rebuilt afterwards, this time with metal.

== In popular culture ==
The disaster inspired the 2005 season finale of the ER television show, titled "The Show Must Go On".

== See also ==
- Berkeley balcony collapse
