= Chicago Pizza and Oven Grinder Company =

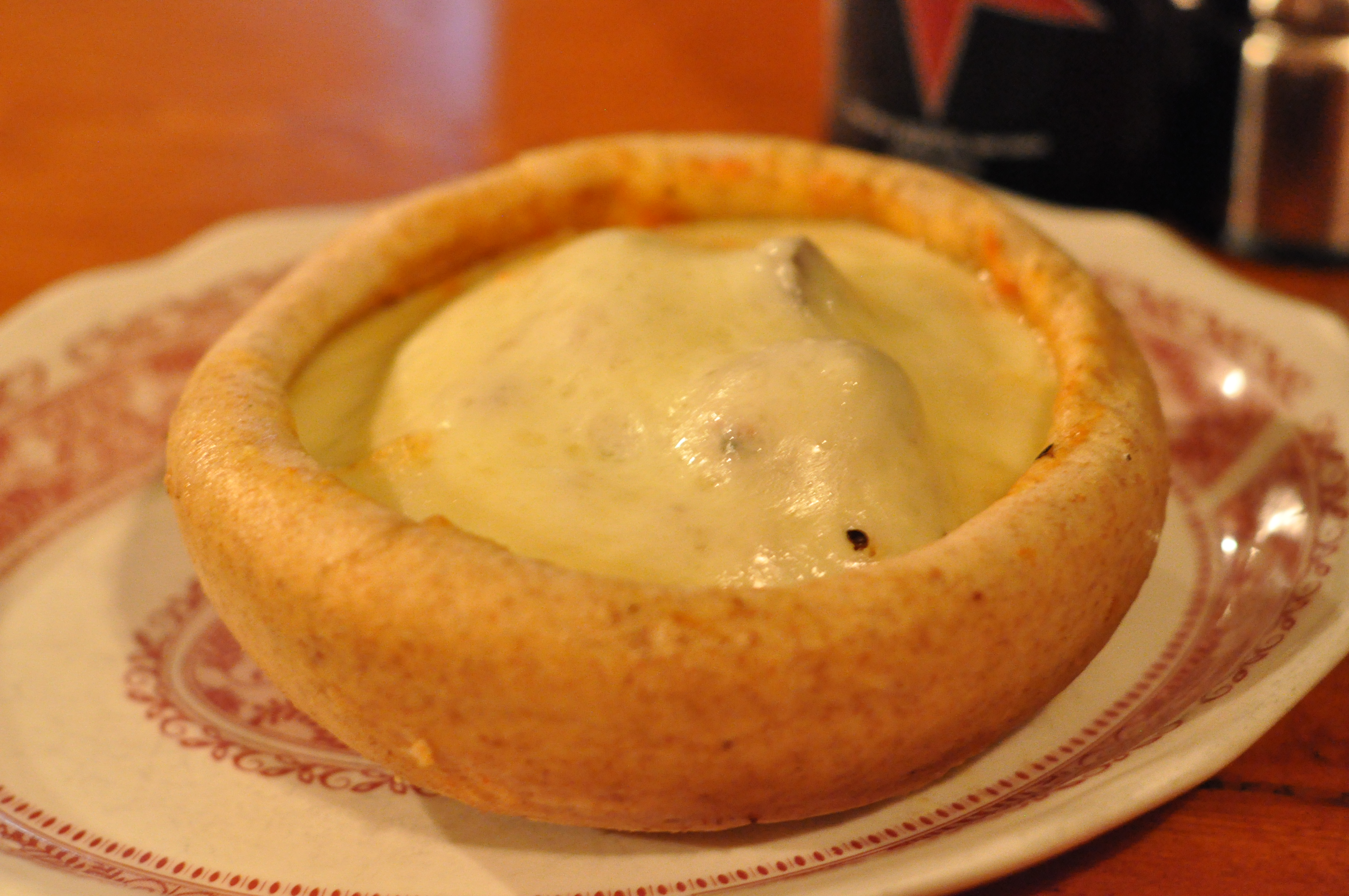
- Their signature dish, Pizza Pot Pie
- Interactive map of Chicago Pizza and Oven Grinder Company

Restaurant information
- Location: 2121 North Clark Street, Chicago, Cook County, Illinois, United States
- Coordinates: 41.92077°N 87.63743°W
- Website: chicagopizzaandovengrinder.com

Chicago Pizza and Oven Grinder Company is a restaurant located in Chicago, Illinois. The restaurant was founded in 1972, and specializes in a signature dish called the "pizza pot pie". It enjoys local popularity and has appeared in many publications and television shows.

== History ==
There is no knowledge of when the building was first built. It has been speculated that the building had some ties to gentility, but those ties were severed in 1929. The parking garage across the street became known as the location of the "St. Valentine's Day Massacre", the infamous murder of seven rival gang members by Al Capone's men. It is rumored that the building itself was used as a lookout point for Capone's gunmen, though there is no concrete evidence to support this theory.

In November 1971, a fire broke out and burned the building to the ground. In April 1972, an attorney named Albert H. Beaver purchased the property. Beaver invested $150,000 into renovating the building. Beaver wanted to create something new and outstanding, and ultimately developed his own recipe for what he called "pizza pot pie".

== Location and competition ==
Chicago Pizza and Oven Grinder Company is located at 2121 North Clark Street, Chicago, Illinois, which is in the Lincoln Park community. Lincoln Park is one of the most affluent areas of Chicago and attracts many tourists. According to Urban Spoon, Chicago Pizza and Oven Grinder Company was approved by 87% of the 900 people who voted. Most likely this is based primarily on the strength of their signature dish: the Pizza Pot Pie. Lou Malnati's Pizzeria is generally considered the company's biggest competitor and is the only pizzeria in the area to score higher with Urban Spoon's users. Café Ba-Ba Reeba was voted at 85% approval, 2% less than Chicago Pizza and Oven Grinder Company for the best restaurant in the northern area of Chicago.

== Fare ==
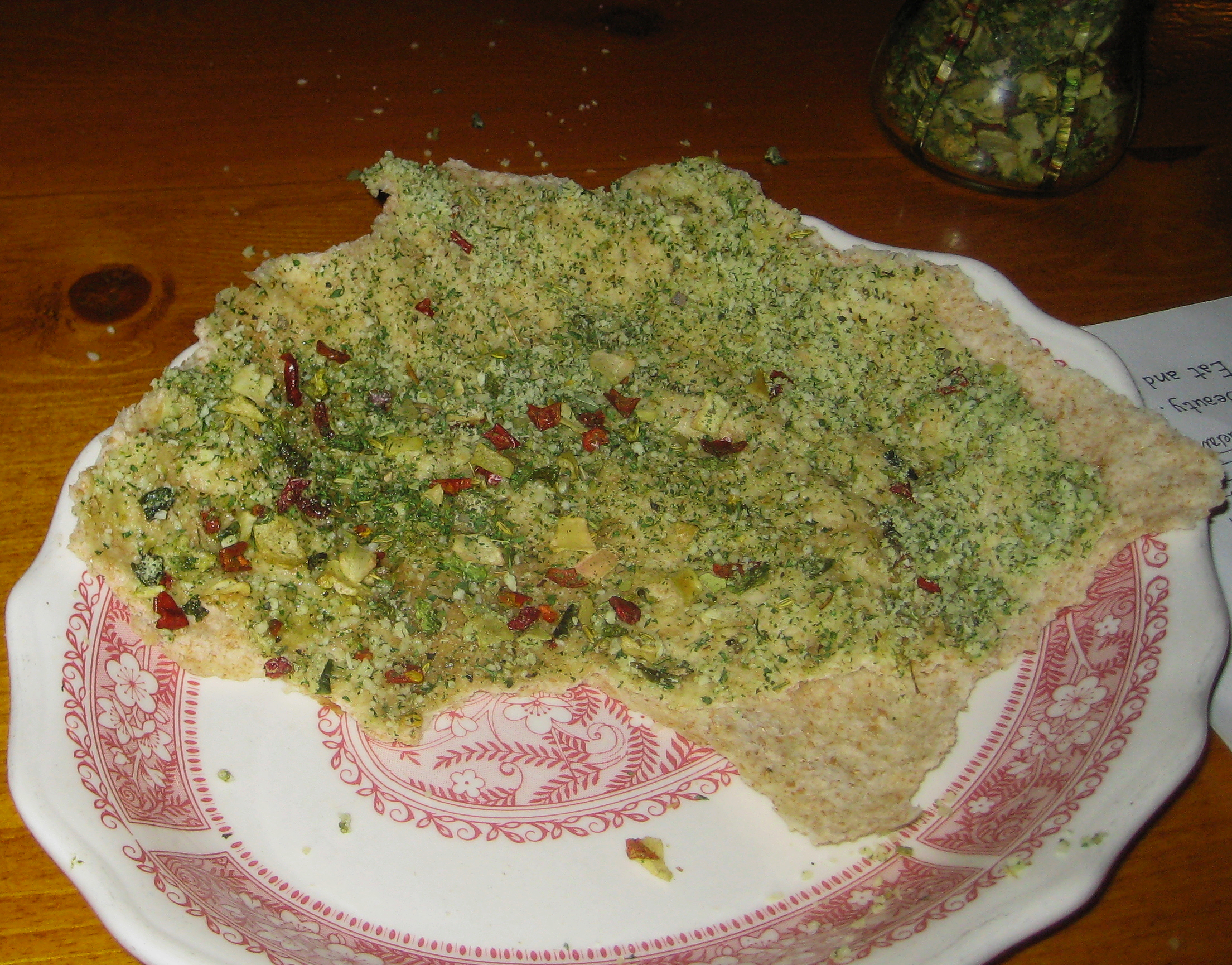
Mediterranean Bread

Chicago Pizza and Oven Grinder Company is the original creator of their non-traditional inverted dish known as the Pizza Pot Pie. The same recipe has been used since the restaurant first opened in 1972. It is "made up from scratch" with a tripled-raised Sicilian bread type of dough, baked upside-down, then brought to the table and flipped over "Dairy Queen blizzard-style". The pizza pot pie includes a plum tomato sauce, sausage made from Boston butts, button-sized mushrooms and cheese inside the crust. They also have a vegetarian option that includes the option of white or wheat crust. The Pizza Pot Pie has individual servings that come in two sizes: half-pound or one-pound.

In addition to their Pizza Pot Pies, they have a variety of salad dinners and sub sandwiches known as grinders. One of the grinders they are known for is the "Italian Combination" that comes in an Italian loaf. The grinders also come in a vegetarian option that includes mushrooms, eggplant, peppers, olives and three kinds of cheeses. The "Salad Dinners" are large portions of salads. Another well-known menu item is the "Mediterranean Bread".

== Reception ==
Chicago Pizza and Oven Grinder Company has garnered some acclaim from various food critics and news outlets for their pizzas and also for the company's sandwiches. CBS Chicago called their oven grinder one of the best sandwiches available in the city. The pizza pot pie also has received favorable reviews by multiple outlets, with the Chicago Tribune reporting that crowds flock to the restaurant specifically for that dish. They are one of the most popular pizzerias in the Chicago area and has appeared in Food Network shows such as Rachael Ray's Tasty Travels. Chef Marc Murphy has commented on the pizza saying, "one bite of the pizza pot pie at Chicago Pizza and Oven Grinder Company and it was instantly deserving of The Best Thing I Ever Ate."
