= The Show Must Go On (ER) =

- ER episode
- Episode no.: Season 11; Episode 22
- Directed by: John Wells
- Written by: David Zabel
- Original air date: May 19, 2005

Episode chronology
← Previous "Carter est Amoureux"	Next → "Cañon City"
- ER season 11

"The Show Must Go On" is the 22nd and final episode of the eleventh season, and the 245th episode overall, of the American television series ER. Written by David Zabel and directed by John Wells, the episode originally aired on NBC on May 19, 2005. The plot features a farewell party for one of the principal characters, Dr. John Carter, and multiple trauma victims of a porch collapse event.

== Plot synopsis ==
Dr. John Carter is back in the States to wrap up his affairs. He purchases half a dozen pizzas for the ER staff, as well as some refreshments. He also treats a patient who has injured her wrist.

Ray is dealing with whether he wants to go into his residency as a doctor. Dr. Archie Morris and Dr. Ray Barnett leave for another party. This party is held on several floors in the back of an apartment building on the balconies at each level. Morris promptly becomes intoxicated, and begins vomiting. Barnett goes to help him. Suddenly the porches collapse, one on top of each other.

Carter then leaves with Dr. Kovač for his "surprise" farewell party, where most of the attending doctors and his friends are waiting for him. County General then stops accepting trauma patients after further problems with the sewer pipes in the hospital leaves them with only one operating room, coupled with the fact that the majority of the ER staff is at Carter's party.

Six people are killed in the porch collapse, and some are not hurt too badly. Five more are critically injured in the accident. Barnett surprises his friends with his handling of the situation. The paramedics on the scene tell Barnett that they are going to take the critically injured to St. Rafe's Hospital because County is closed. County is the only Chicago hospital that has Level I Trauma Status in the show, making it the first choice for such situations. Barnett uses the radio to call County and demands that Abby reopen the ER, otherwise the five critical patients would probably not make it to the hospital. Dr. Lockhart initially refuses, as there are no attending physicians and only one OR, but when one of the critical patients dies, she relents.

Unable to reach Dr. Kovač by pager, they send a student over to fetch him. The party immediately evaporates, as everyone runs back to the ER to help the victims of the porch collapse. A surprised Carter returns from the restroom to empty tables. They spend some time watching a slideshow of his time at County. The presentation features past ER doctors, including Dr. Doug Ross (George Clooney), Dr. Mark Greene (Anthony Edwards), and Dr. Peter Benton (Eriq La Salle). Eventually Dr. Susan Lewis brings Carter back to the ER.

Carter treats one last patient before leaving County General. He is surprised to learn that he delivered the young girl with the broken wrist 11 years ago in Season 1.

Before he leaves he stops by to see Ray, Neela and Abby and shares the letter he wrote to himself as an intern under Dr. Greene, that had sat in his locker until this point. As Carter is leaving the hospital for the last time, Dr. Greene and Dr. Benton (his primary mentors) and Nurse Carol Hathaway are heard in voice-overs. Outside, he finds a fatigued and partially sober Morris crouching outside. Carter repeats to the new chief resident the advice that was given to him by Dr. Greene and to Dr. Greene by Dr. Morgenstern: "You set the tone."

== Inspirations ==
The porch collapse featured in this episode is based on the true story of the 2003 Chicago balcony collapse.

== Also starring ==
=== Staff ===
- Scott Grimes as Dr. Archie Morris
- Leland Orser as Dr. Lucien Dubenko
- Sara Gilbert as Dr. Jane Figler
- Anthony Giangrande as Dr. Jeremy Munson
- Britain Spellings as Dr. Sackowitz
- Michael Spellman as Dr. Jim Babinski
- Yvette Freeman as Nurse Haleh Adams
- Lily Mariye as Nurse Lily Jarvik
- Laura Ceron as Nurse Chuny Marquez
- Deezer D as Nurse Malik McGrath
- Kyle Richards as Nurse Dori
- Abraham Benrubi as Desk Clerk Jerry Markovic
- Monte Russell as Paramedic Dwight Zadro
- Lyn A. Henderson as Paramedic Pamela Olbes
- Emily Wagner as Paramedic Doris Pickman
- Brian Lester as Paramedic Brian Dumar
- Jordan Calloway as Volunteer K.J.

This is the final episode with Noah Wyle (who plays Dr. John Carter) as a regular cast member, although he has several guest appearances in later episodes.

This is Scott Grimes' final episode before becoming a regular cast member in season 12, playing character Archie Morris.

=== Others ===
- Danny Glover as Charlie Pratt
- Sam Jones III as Chaz Pratt
