= Lincoln Park (community area), Chicago =

Community area in Chicago, Illinois

Lincoln Park
- Community area
- Community Area 07 – Lincoln Park
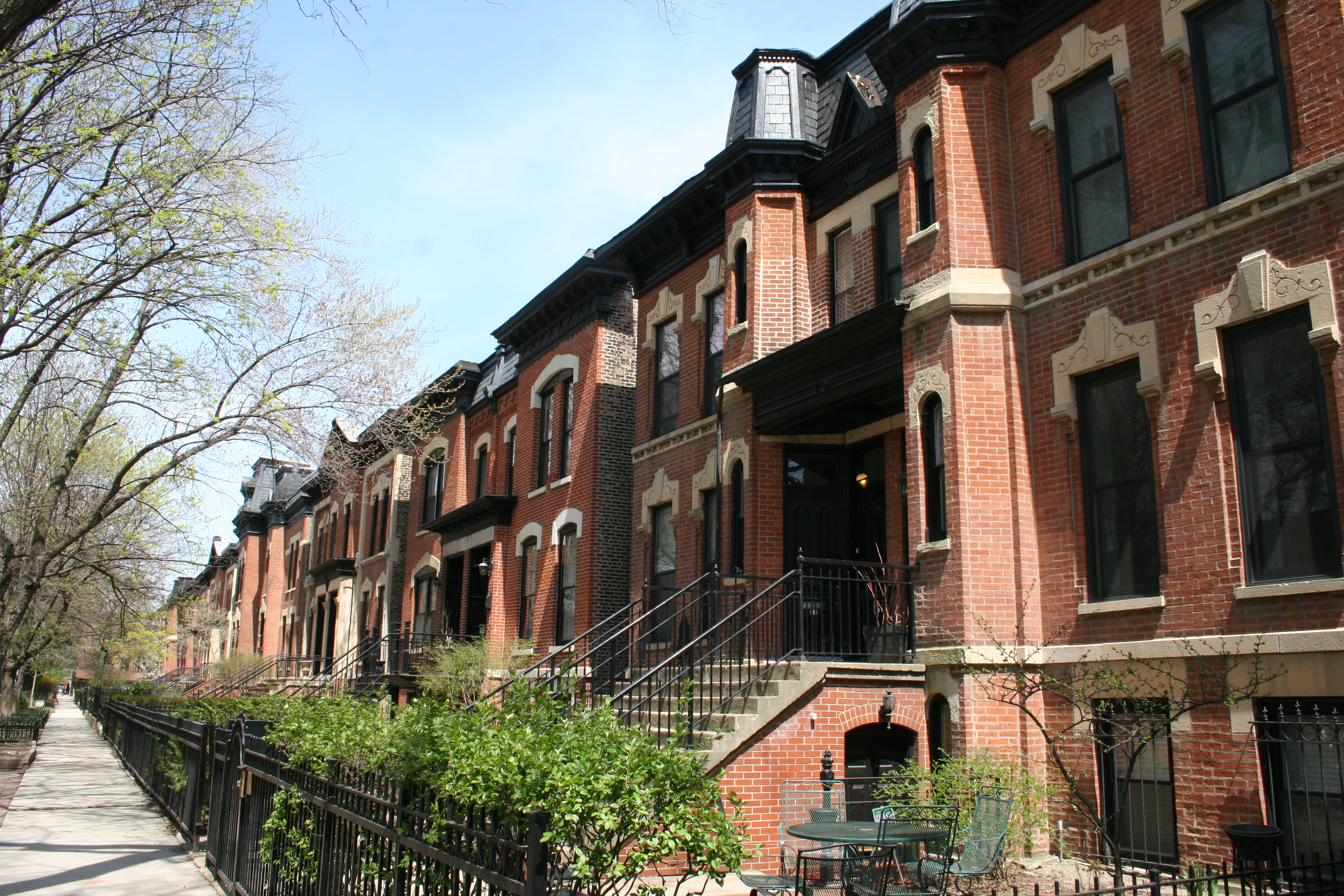
- Bissell Street District in the Lincoln Park neighborhood

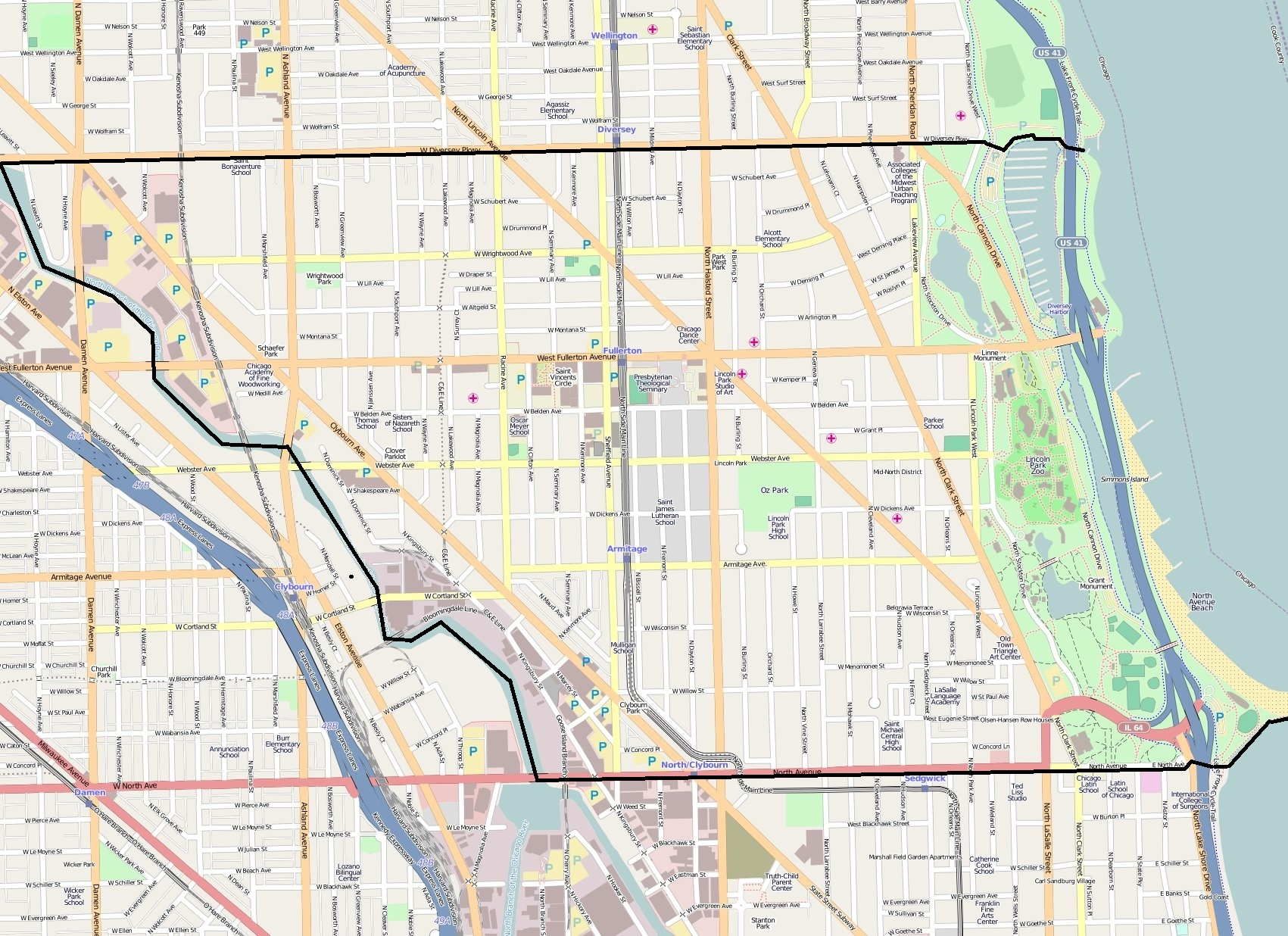
- Lincoln Park map

- Location within the city of Chicago
- Coordinates: 41°55.2′N 87°39′W
- Country: United States
- State: Illinois
- County: Cook
- City: Chicago
- Named for: Lincoln Park

Area
  - Total: 3.17 sq mi (8.21 km^{2})

Population (2024)
  - Total: 67,987
  - Density: 21,781/sq mi (8,409.8/km^{2})

Demographics 2024
  - White: 76.7%
  - Black: 2.5%
  - Hispanic: 7.9%
  - Asian: 8.1%
  - Other: 4.8%

Educational Attainment 2024
  - High School Diploma or Higher: 97.9%
  - Bachelor's Degree or Higher: 86.9%
- Time zone: UTC-6 (CST)
  - Summer (DST): UTC-5 (CDT)
- ZIP Codes: parts of 60614
- Median household income 2024: $137,914
- Source: U.S. Census, Record Information Services

Lincoln Park is one of the 77 community areas of Chicago in Illinois, United States. It is located west of the public park Lincoln Park.

== History ==
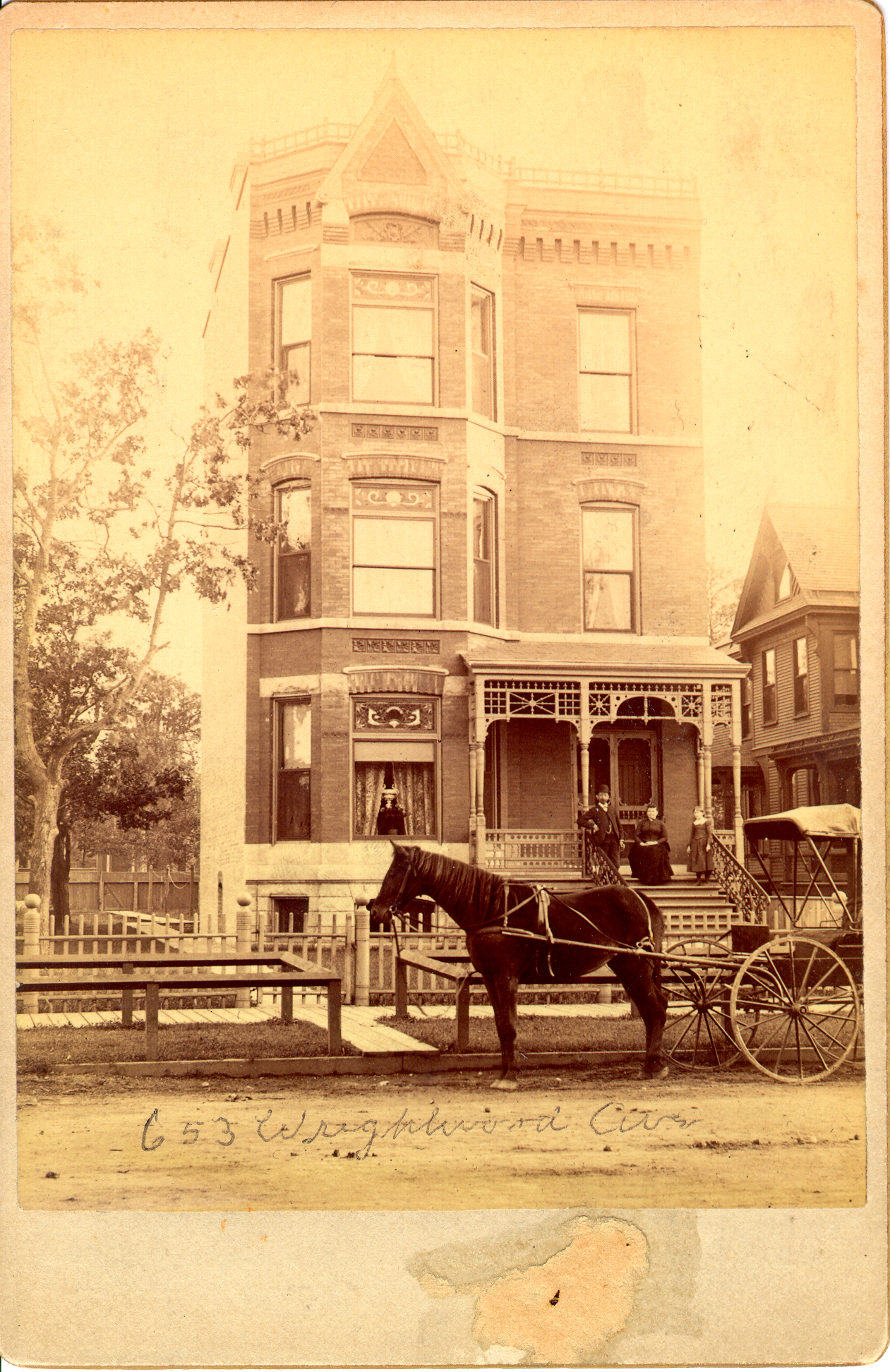
1880s photo in a Lincoln Park neighborhood

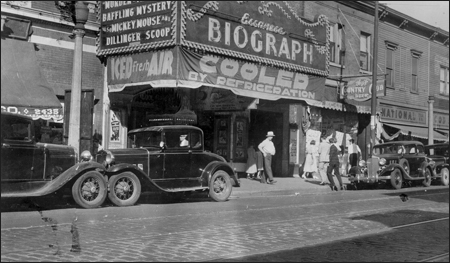
1934 FBI photograph of the Biograph, soon after the shooting of John Dillinger

In 1824, the United States Army built a small post near today's Clybourn Avenue and Armitage Avenue (formerly Centre Street). Native American settlements existed along Green Bay Trail, now called Clark Street, and along Little Fort Road, now called Lincoln Avenue, at the current intersection of Halsted Street and Fullerton Avenue. Before Green Bay Trail became Clark Street, it stretched as far as Green Bay, Wisconsin, including Sheridan Road, and was part of what still is Green Bay Road in Milwaukee County, Wisconsin.

Federally owned land in what is now Lincoln Park was ceded to the State of Illinois in 1828. In 1837, the same year that Chicago was incorporated as a city, the state granted permission for residents of the Chicago to use the area north of its border at North Avenue for a cemetery. Later, in response to a cholera epidemic, several more acres were purchased for a hospital and quarantine area. Settlements increased along Green Bay Trail when the government offered land claims and Green Bay Road was widened. The area was incorporated as Lake View Township, which would remain a separate administrative district until being formally annexed by the City of Chicago in 1898. Physicians and citizens complained that having a burial ground in close proximity to a growing residential area was unsanitary. In 1860, they petitioned the Chicago Common Council to repurpose its properties in Lake View as a public park. The sale of burial plots ceased, and small improvements began to be made. In 1865, following the end of the Civil War and the assassination of Abraham Lincoln, the name was changed from "Lake Park" to "Lincoln Park." As with many other Chicago neighborhoods, the name of the park eventually came to refer to the broader area surrounding it.

In the postwar years, the area around Southport and Clybourn became home to a community of Kashubian immigrants. Arriving from what is now north-eastern Poland, Chicago's Kashubians brought their own distinct culture and language, influenced by their rustic traditions, and by their close contact with their German neighbors. In 1882, St. Josaphat's Roman Catholic parish was established specifically for the Kashubian community. The resulting nicknames of "Jozafatowo" (Polish for "Josaphat's Town") as well as "Kaszubowo" (Polish for "Cassubian Town") made the neighborhood one of Chicago's Polish Patches. The current Romanesque Revival church building was completed in 1902. A Pomeranian Griffin Crest visible on the school south of the church is a nod to the parish that once anchored one of the communities in Chicago dubbed Little Cassubia.

Chicago, Grande Roue (1896), Lumière Brothers catalog no. 338)

From 1896 to 1903, the original Ferris Wheel was located at a small amusement park near Clark St. and Wrightwood Ave. The site was from 2619 to 2665 N. Clark St., which is now the location of a McDonald's and a high-rise residential building. On February 14, 1929, seven mob associates and a mechanic were shot to death in an automobile garage at 2122 N. Clark St.

During the Great Depression, many buildings in Lincoln Park fell into disrepair. In 1954 the Lincoln Park Conservation Association was founded to prevent deterioration of housing in the neighborhood and by 1956 Lincoln Park received urban renewal funds to renovate and restore old buildings and schools.

In 1968, a violent confrontation between demonstrators and police in Lincoln Park occurred during the week of the 1968 Democratic National Convention.

I pointed out that it was in the best interests of the City to have us in Lincoln Park ten miles away from the Convention hall. I said we had no intention of marching on the Convention hall, that I didn't particularly think that politics in America could be changed by marches and rallies, that what we were presenting was an alternative life style, and we hoped that people of Chicago would come up, and mingle in Lincoln Park and see what we were about.

— Abbie Hoffman from the Chicago 7 trial

Amidst the confrontation, the Church of Our Saviour opened its doors to provide shelter to young people fleeing the violence, beginning a decades long tradition of services that would eventually see the creation of Care for Friends as a nonprofit organization who opened a separate community center behind the church building in 2025.

In the 1950s, 1960s, and 1970s, Lincoln Park became home to the first Puerto Rican immigrants to Chicago. Jose Cha Cha Jimenez transformed the local Young Lords gang into human rights activists for Latinos and the poor. They published newspapers, mounted sit-ins and takeovers of institutions and churches at Grant Hospital, Armitage Ave. Methodist Church, and McCormick Theological Seminary. In 1969, members of the Puerto Rican Young Lords and residents and activists mounted gigantic demonstrations and protested the displacement of Puerto Ricans and the poor including the demolition of buildings on the corner of Halsted and Armitage streets, by occupying the space and some administration buildings at McCormick Theological Seminary. There were civil rights arrests and martyrs including the unsolved murders of United Methodist Rev. Bruce Johnson and his wife Eugenia Ransier Johnson who were strong supporters of the poor. Today their history is archived at DePaul University's Richardson Library and at Special Collections at Grand Valley State University.

On June 29, 2003, a porch collapse occurred during a party at 713 W. Wrightwood Ave. The disaster was the deadliest porch collapse in U.S. history; 13 people were killed and 57 seriously injured.

As of 2015, the neighborhood is primarily made up of young urban professionals, recent college graduates, and young families. The slang terms Trixie and Chad have their origins in Lincoln Park.

== Geography ==
Lincoln Park's boundaries are precisely defined in the city's list of official community areas. It is bordered on the north by Diversey Parkway, on the west by the Chicago River, on the south by North Avenue, and on the east by Lake Michigan.

It encompasses a number of neighborhoods, including Lincoln Central, Mid-North, Old Town Triangle, Park West, RANCH Triangle, Sheffield, and Wrightwood Neighbors. The area also includes most of the Clybourn Corridor retail district, which continues into the Near North Side.

The Arlington-Deming District is notable for containing historic buildings built after the Great Chicago Fire, when stricter building regulations within the city motivated builders to move into the Arlington-Deming District, which was located in the Township of Lake View at the time, and was not subject to the new regulations.

== Demographics ==
Historical population
| Census | Pop. | Note | %± |
|---|---|---|---|
| 1910 | 92,887 | | — |
| 1920 | 94,247 | | 1.5% |
| 1930 | 97,873 | | 3.8% |
| 1940 | 100,826 | | 3.0% |
| 1950 | 102,396 | | 1.6% |
| 1960 | 88,836 | | −13.2% |
| 1970 | 67,718 | | −23.8% |
| 1980 | 57,146 | | −15.6% |
| 1990 | 61,092 | | 6.9% |
| 2000 | 64,323 | | 5.3% |
| 2010 | 64,116 | | −0.3% |
| 2020 | 70,492 | | 9.9% |
| 2024 (est.) | 67,987 | | −3.6% |

== Economy ==
A. Finkl & Sons Steel operated on the west side of Lincoln park along an approximately 22-acre lot by the Chicago River for 113 years. It is now the site of the planned Foundry Park residential community project.

== Arts and culture ==
=== Public libraries ===
Chicago Public Library operates the Lincoln Park Branch.

=== Cuisine ===
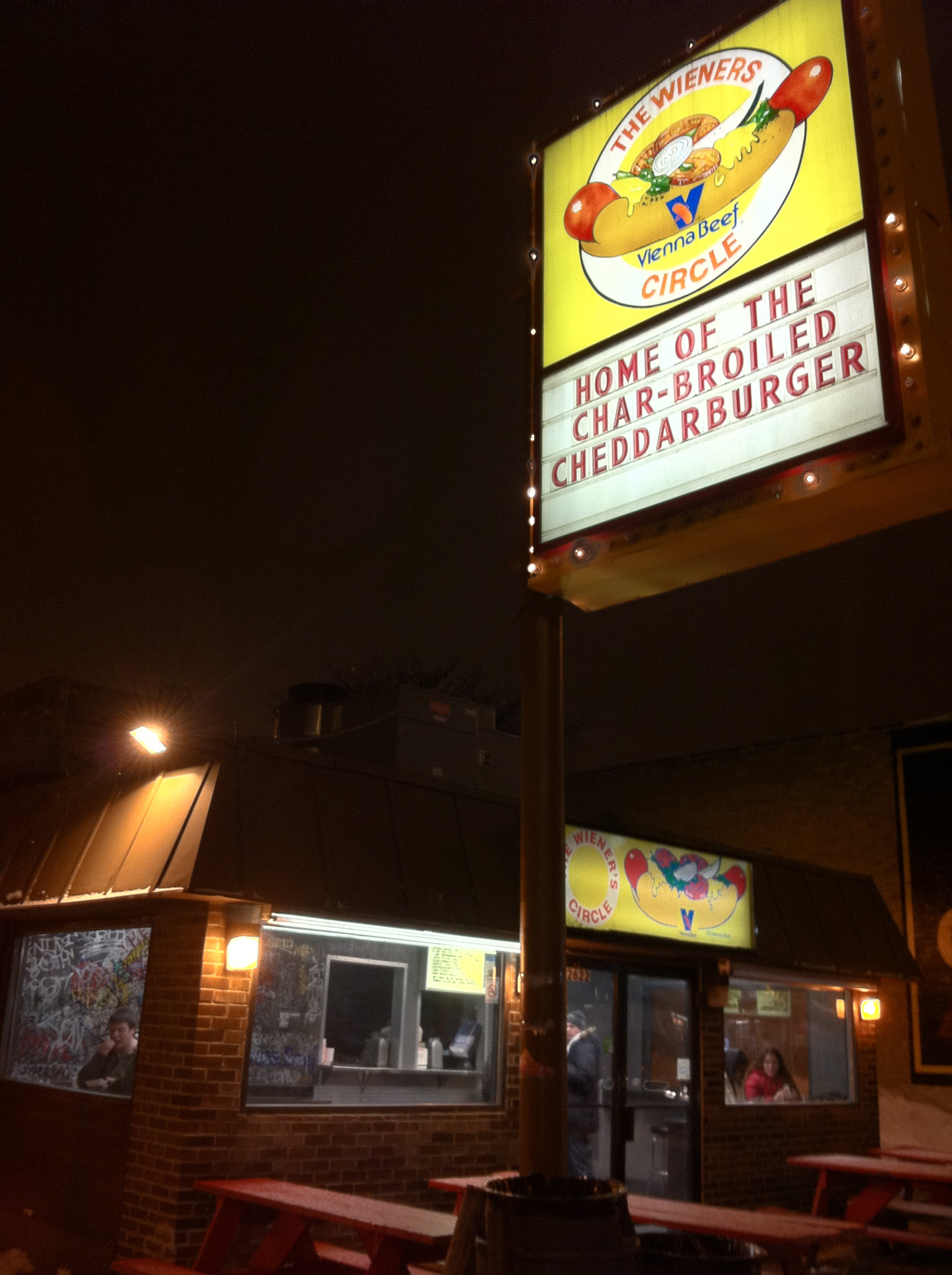
The Wieners Circle

Lincoln Park has a three-Michelin star restaurant, Alinea, and Galit, a one-Michelin star restaurant. The Lettuce Entertain You restaurant company started at R.J. Grunts, and featured the first salad bars. The Wieners Circle is a fast food restaurant known for Polish sausage. Demon Dogs was a hot dog restaurant that stood under the Fullerton 'L' station from 1983 until 2006. The first Potbelly Sandwich Works opened in 1977 on Lincoln Avenue in Lincoln Park. Chicago Pizza and Oven Grinder Company is a restaurant on Clark Street. Lincoln Park is home to neighborhood taverns such as The Burwood Tap, founded in 1933 and considered one of the oldest continuously operated bars in the city.

=== Community Services ===
Care for Friends is a non-profit that provides meal programs, health clinics, and other support services to people experiencing homelessness and food insecurity in Lincoln Park, Edgewater, and South Loop.

=== Music ===
Lincoln Hall is a music venue located here.

Jelly Roll Morton recorded early jazz work in 1926 at the Webster Hotel ballroom (now Webster House).

=== Churches ===
Lincoln Park is also home to five architecturally significant churches: St. Vincent de Paul Parish, St. Clement Church, St. Josaphat's (one of the many so-called 'Polish Cathedrals' in Chicago), St. James Lutheran Church and St. Michael's Church in the Old Town Triangle area of Lincoln Park.

== Parks and recreation ==
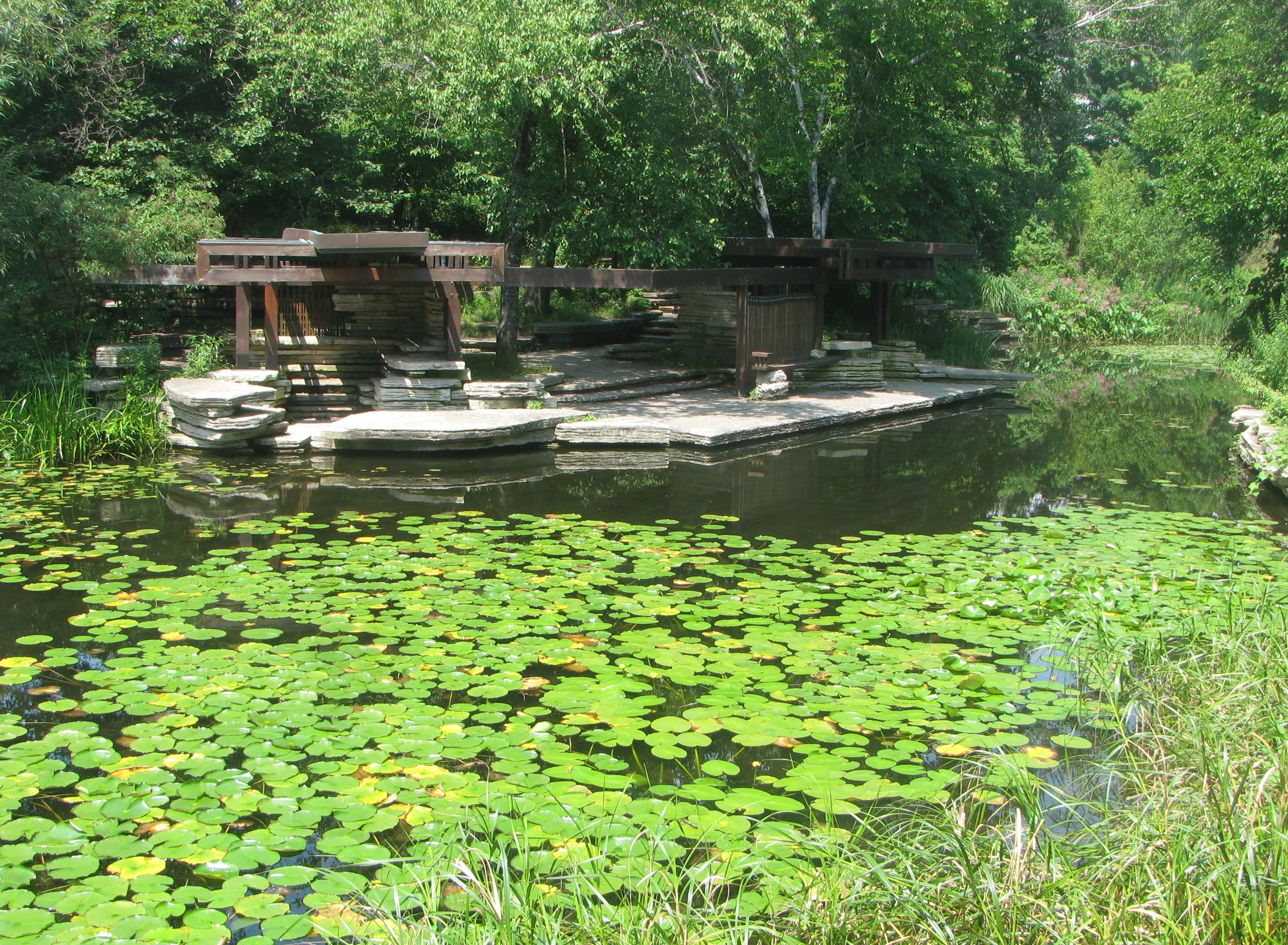
Alfred Caldwell Lily Pool in Lincoln Park is a National Historic Landmark listing.

Lincoln Park, for which the neighborhood was named, now stretches miles past the neighborhood of Lincoln Park. The park lies along the lakefront from Ohio Street Beach in the Streeterville neighborhood, northward to Ardmore Avenue in Edgewater. The section of the park adjacent to the Lincoln Park neighborhood contains Lincoln Park Zoo, Lincoln Park Conservatory, an outdoor theatre, a rowing canal, the Chicago History Museum, the Peggy Notebaert Nature Museum, the Alfred Caldwell Lily Pool, the North Pond Nature Sanctuary, North Avenue Beach, playing fields, a very prominent statue of General Ulysses S. Grant, as well as a famous statue of Abraham Lincoln (and many other statues).

Many smaller parks, such as Oz Park, Bauler Park (named for 'Paddy' Bauler, former Alderman of the 43rd ward), Wiggly Field, and Jonquil Park are scattered throughout the Lincoln Park community area.

The YMCA opened the New City YMCA in 1981. The YMCA's clientele included people in Lincoln Park and in Cabrini-Green. As the YMCA was located in the latter, it was built windowless so it would not suffer from stray bullets, a product of crime in that neighborhood. CBS Chicago 2 stated that the facility was "once credited with breaking down a barrier between families from" different socioeconomic communities. In 2007, the YMCA closed, with the land sold, as Cabrini Green's impoverished community moved away. The YMCA shifted its focus and planned to open a new facility in Kelly Hall of the Mission of Our Lady of the Angels in Humboldt Park.

== Government ==
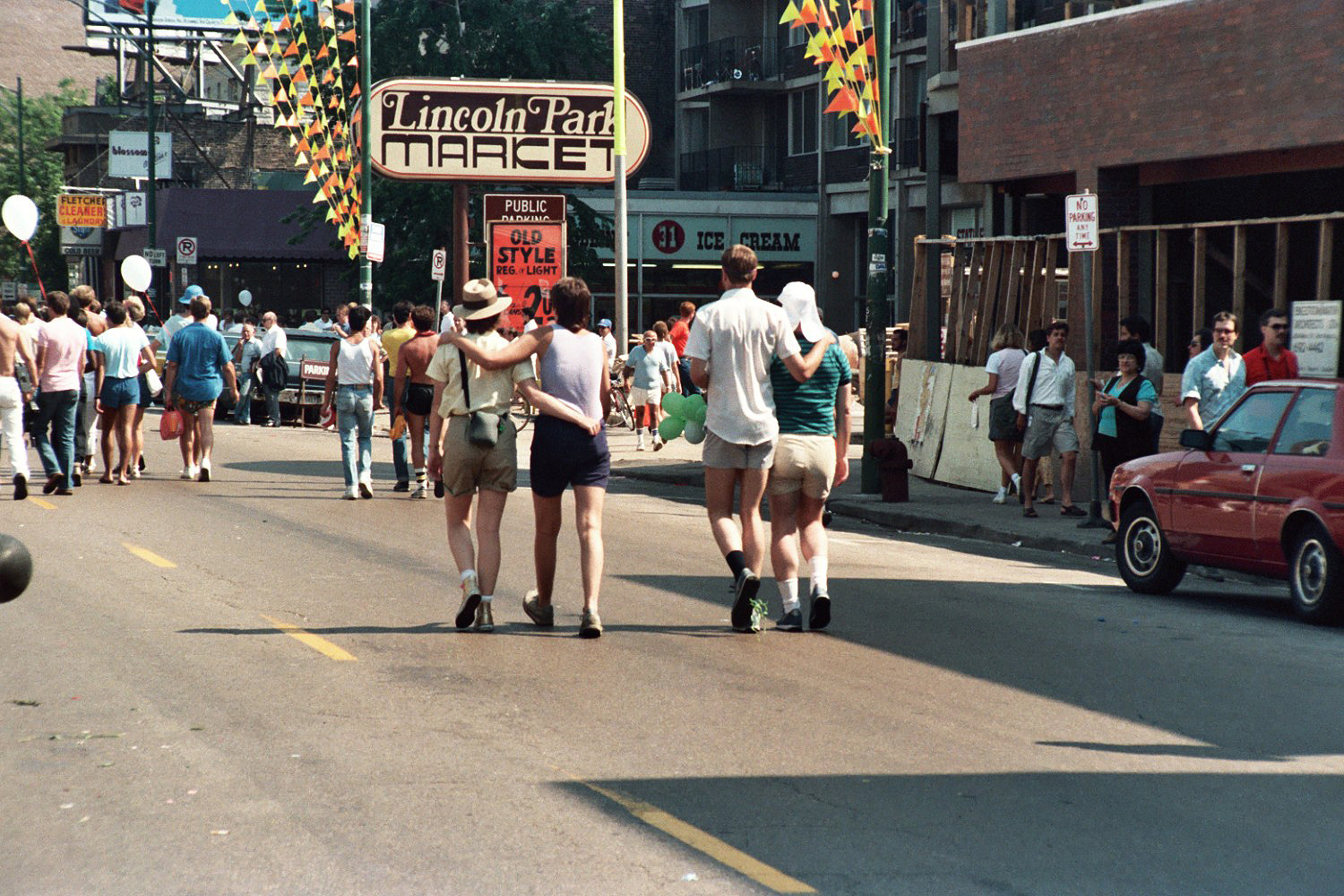
Chicago Pride Parade in Lincoln Park in 1985 on Clark Street

=== Local ===
Most of Lincoln Park is currently part of the 43rd ward of the Chicago City Council, represented by Timmy Knudsen. The extreme south and extreme western sections of the neighborhood are part of the 2nd and 32nd wards, represented respectively by Brian Hopkins and Scott Waguespack. All three aldermen are Democrats.

=== State ===
In the Illinois House of Representatives, the lakefront portion of the neighborhood is part of the 12th district, represented by Margaret Croke. Central Lincoln Park is part of Ann Williams' 11th District, and the riverside portion of the neighborhood is represented by Jaime Andrade in the 40th district. The Sheffield Neighbors area is part of Jawaharial Williams's 10th district, and a small southern portion of the neighborhood is represented by Lakesia Collins. All representatives are Democrats.

In the Illinois Senate, most of the area is part of District 6, represented by Democrat Sara Feigenholtz, while the southwest quarter is part of District 5, represented by Democrat Patricia Van Pelt.

=== Federal ===
In the United States House of Representatives, the vast majority of the area is in Illinois's 5th congressional district, represented by Democrat Mike Quigley. A minuscule portion in the south is part of Illinois's 7th congressional district, represented by Democrat Danny K. Davis.

The Lincoln Park community area has supported the Democratic Party in the past two presidential elections. In the 2016 presidential election, Lincoln Park cast 24,197 votes for Hillary Clinton and cast 5,072 votes for Donald Trump (77.31% to 16.20%). In the 2012 presidential election, Lincoln Park cast 19,268 votes for Barack Obama and cast 9,592 votes for Mitt Romney (65.37% to 32.54%).

== Education ==
=== Public schools ===
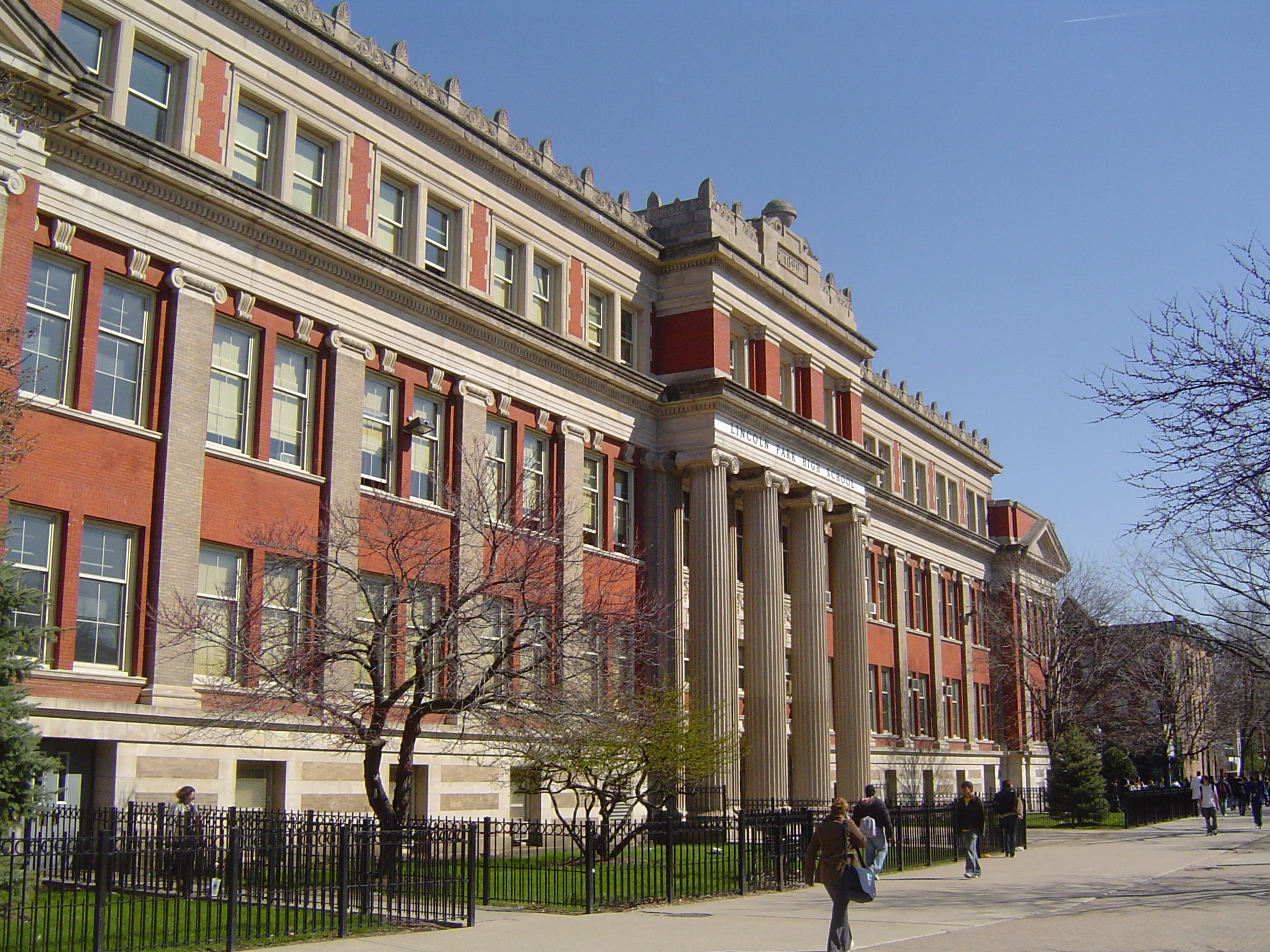
Lincoln Park High School

Lincoln Park residents are served by Chicago Public Schools.

Lincoln Park High School serves as the sole neighborhood secondary education institution.

Additionally, two zoned elementary schools (grades K–8), Abraham Lincoln Elementary School and Louisa May Alcott School. are found in the neighborhood. LaSalle Language Academy, Oscar Mayer Elementary School, and the Newberry Math and Science Academy, all magnet schools, serve the neighborhood.

Melanie Ann Apel, author of Lincoln Park, Chicago, described Lincoln School as "the school most often associated with Lincoln Park".

=== Private schools ===
The Roman Catholic Archdiocese of Chicago operates the Saint Clement School, a K–8 school, in the Lincoln Park area.

Saint James Lutheran School, a K–8 school, and Francis W. Parker School, a K–12 school, are located here.

=== University ===
- DePaul University

== Infrastructure ==
=== Transportation ===
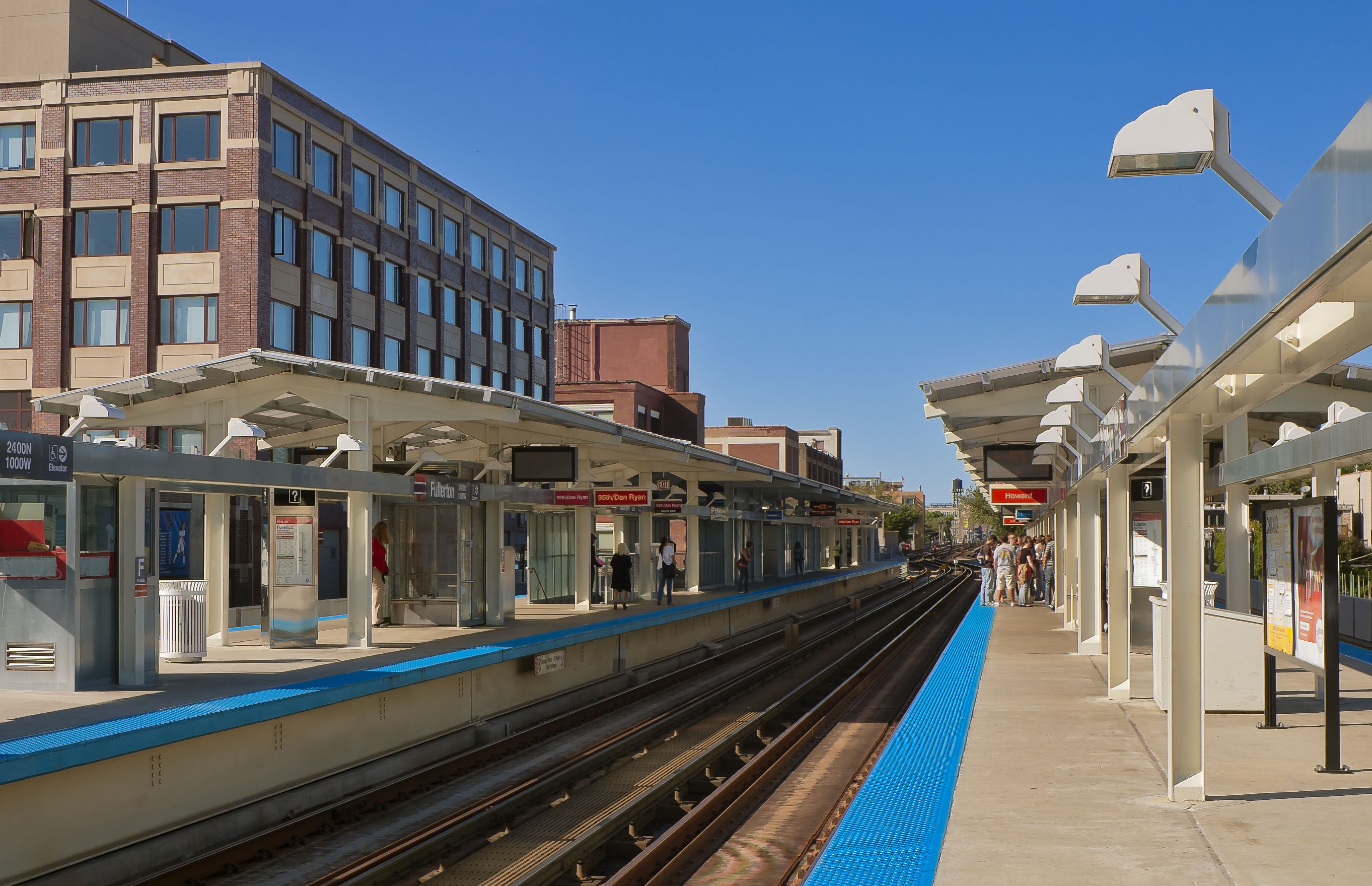
Fullerton station

The Lincoln Park neighborhood is accessible via mass transit operated by the CTA. These include the Chicago "L"'s Red, Brown and Purple lines at Fullerton station and the Purple and Brown lines at Armitage and Diversey stations, as well as CTA bus service.

Metra's Union Pacific North and Union Pacific Northwest lines have a stop at Clybourn station.

== Notable people ==
- J. J. Bittenbinder (1942–2023), police officer, television host, and author. He was a childhood resident of the DePaul neighborhood in Lincoln Park.
- Roger Brown, an important Chicago Imagist painter, lived at 1926 N. Halsted St. The house is now site to the Art Institute of Chicago's Roger Brown study center.
- Mother Frances Xavier Cabrini, the first American saint, lived at 2520 N. Lakeview Ave. This address was part of the Columbus Hospital site which is now a high-rise condominium development. The National Shrine of Saint Francis Xavier Cabrini, the former chapel of Columbus Hospital, is adjacent to the newer development.
- Henry Darger, the outsider artist, lived at 851 W. Webster Ave. and worked as a janitor at Children's Memorial Hospital.
- Henry Gerber, the founder of the first homosexual rights organization in the US, lived at 1710 N. Crilly Court.
- Bruce Graham, the famous Skidmore, Owings and Merrill architect, lived in a house he himself designed in 1969.
- Richard Hunt, the famous sculptor, has his studio at 1017 W. Lill Avenue, a decommissioned electrical substation.
- Bruce Heyman, 30th United States Ambassador to Canada. Heyman is a resident of Lincoln Park.
- Jose "Cha Cha" Jimenez, founder of the Young Lords who fought the forced displacement of Puerto Ricans and the poor from Lincoln Park.
- Kelly Loeffler (born 1970), United States Senator and businesswoman. She lived in Lincoln Park while studying at Kellstadt Graduate School of Business.
- László Moholy-Nagy, the Bauhaus and IIT designer, lived at 2622 N. Lakeview Ave.
- John Mulaney, comedian, was raised in Lincoln Park and attended St. Clement school.
- Walter Netsch, an architect, and his wife Dawn Clark Netsch, the 4th Illinois Comptroller, lived at 1700 N. Hudson Ave. The house was designed by Walter in 1974.
- Albert Parsons and Lucy Parsons, the prominent union organizers and socialist leaders, lived at 1908 N. Mohawk St.
- Gene Siskel and Roger Ebert, film critics, both lived in Lincoln Park.
- Sargent Shriver and Eunice Kennedy. They moved to Lincoln Park from the Near North Side shortly after Shriver was appointed President of the Chicago Board of Education.
- Ruth Ann Steinhagen, typist notable for attempting to murder Eddie Waitkus.
- Charlie Trotter, chef.
- Luis Vicente Gutiérrez, politician, grew up in Lincoln Park until the age of 13.
- George Kirke Spoor, film pioneer, lived in Old Town.
- Jonathan Toews, NHL hockey player
- Melvin Alvah Traylor (1878–1934), lawyer and banker. He resided in Lincoln Park at his time of death.
- Penny Pritzker
- Fred Eychaner
- Joe Mansueto
