= Care for Friends =

Chicago Nonprofit Organization

- Predecessor: Church of Our Saviour outreach program (1968)
- Formation: 2012
- Type: 501(c)(3) non-profit organization
- Purpose: Homelessness, Food insecurity
- Location: Chicago, Illinois, U.S.
- Executive Director: Nicole Meunier
- Board Chair Emeritus: JD Miller, PhD
- Website: careforfriends.org

Care for Friends is a non-profit organization in Chicago, Illinois, that provides services to people experiencing homelessness and food insecurity. The organization operates meal programs, health clinics, and other support services from their locations in the Lincoln Park, Edgewater, and South Loop neighborhoods.

Founded as a church outreach program in 1968, it was formally incorporated as a distinct 501(c)(3) organization in 2013. In 2024, the organization began construction on a $9.2 million community center and headquarters in Lincoln Park, a project that received significant local media coverage and a $3 million grant from the State of Illinois.

== History ==
The services that would become Care for Friends began in 1968, when the Church of Our Saviour in Lincoln Park provided shelter to young people fleeing the 1968 Democratic National Convention protests. The church's outreach continued for several decades.

In 2012, the program was formally established as an independent 501(c)(3) organization named "The 530 Fullerton Foundation," with JD Miller as its founding president. The organization rebranded as "Care for Friends" in 2016. During the COVID-19 pandemic, the organization started a grocery-delivery service for students and their families.

The organization later expanded its meal services to a location in the Edgewater neighborhood and subsequently took over management at a third location for the South Loop Community Table, a meal program operating at Second Presbyterian Church.

== Community Center ==
In March 2024, Care for Friends broke ground on a new community center on the campus of the Church of Our Saviour in Lincoln Park, where its services originated. The $9.2 million facility opened in 2025, serves as the organization's permanent headquarters, and houses meal services, healthcare programs, and educational resources.

The project was funded in part by a $3 million grant from the State of Illinois, support for which was secured by State Senator Sara Feigenholtz. 43rd Ward Alderman Timmy Knudsen also provided support through the project's zoning approval process.

== Operations ==
Care for Friends' programs include food services, healthcare, and other support services.

Food Services: The organization operates hot meal programs at its locations in Lincoln Park, Edgewater, and the South Loop. It also runs a grocery delivery program.

Healthcare: Health services include a foot care clinic staffed by volunteer nurses and podiatrists, as well as general health screenings and referrals to partner medical facilities.

Support Services: The organization distributes clothing and personal hygiene kits.

The organization's fundraising events include an annual "Sleepout for Homelessness" event where volunteers spend a night outdoors in February and a "Culinary Battle Royale" event hosted by the Andersonville Chamber of Commerce. They also host a "Power Hope Awards Gala" that has recognized Chicagoans who have made an impact in the community, including Alexi Giannoulias, Matt Forte, Mikki Kendall, Imran Khan, and Ian Gerard.

== See also ==
- Homelessness in the United States
- Homelessness in Illinois
- Food insecurity
- List of Food Banks
- Non-profit organizations based in Chicago
