= Nourishing Hope =

American non-profit organization

Nourishing Hope Chicago
- Formation: 1970
- Founder: Jo Bolger, Kate Marshall, and Barbara Langer-Tchaou
- Type: 501(c)(3) non-profit organization
- Headquarters: 1716 W. Hubbard St. Chicago, IL 60622
- CEO: Mitzi D. Baum
- Website: nourishinghopechi.org

Nourishing Hope Chicago is a 501(c)(3) non-profit organization which is focused on addressing food insecurity and promoting nutritional wellness in the Chicago metropolitan area. As one of the city's largest and longest-operating food pantries, Nourishing Hope serves food and essential resources to those in need. Through social service programs, including case management, mental health counseling, job search support.

== History ==
Nourishing Hope was established from the ground up in 1970. Originally known as "The People's Pantry of Lakeview," the newly founded organization functioned at a much smaller scale, but came to be one of the longest serving food pantries in Chicago. Now known as Nourishing Hope, the organization has evolved into a far-reaching community support organization that is dedicated to addressing food insecurity and promoting nutritional wellness in the Chicago metropolitan area.

Nourishing Hope began its mission to address hunger in the Lakeview community of Chicago. Originally operating out of local churches and grocery stores, the pantry served just under 100 people in its inaugural year. Over time, the food pantry has evolved into a comprehensive organization employing over 50 staff and supported by more than 6,000 volunteers, serving residents throughout Chicago with a focus on providing food assistance, social services, and mental health counseling.

In 1989, Nourishing Hope introduced a home delivery program offering home delivery of groceries. Initially Home Delivery served seniors and individuals with disabilities but later expanded. Clients must be eligible for a home delivery which runs only on Saturday, and only if they live within the service areas. This option grants individuals seeking food assistance more range in selecting the products they receive.

In 2023, Nourishing Hope received a $1 million grant from the Northern Trust Anchor Awards. The grant supports expansion, staff hiring, a delivery vehicle, software improvement, and potential partnerships for their digital grocery program and a possible South Side food pantry. In 2023, the organization provided the equivalent of 4 million meals to people in various communities throughout Chicago.

== Operations ==
Nourishing Hope Chicago originally operated out of a temporary location before acquiring a permanent building at 3945 N. Sheridan Road in 2015. The organization underwent a rebranding in 2022, emphasizing its commitment to personalized food distribution and innovative social service programs. Nourishing Hope focuses on personalized food distribution by catering to individual needs. Nourishing Hope's encompasses strategies to address accessibility challenges, including remote assistance for those unable to access in person.

Nourishing Hope's uses a multi-step approach, which addresses immediate food assistance.

== Programs ==
Nourishing Hope operates food distribution programs five days a week, matching individuals with the food they need and want.

Nourishing Hope employs licensed and trained professionals who assist clients experiencing depression, anxiety, grief, and other stressors. They focus on addressing the root causes of mental illness and do not require insurance for their services.

Nourishing Hope offers assistance to help individuals navigate state and local resources. Onsite resources are available for public benefits like SNAP, housing, and transportation. These service programs aim to help individuals find work and shelter. Nourishing Hope assists people when applying for public benefits such as Medicaid, online applications for housing waitlists, public transit, and other financial assistance and information about employment.

Nourishing Hope provides home delivery services for older adults, homebound individuals, and those living with disabilities.
