= Berkeley balcony collapse =

2015 accident in Berkeley, California, US

- Date: June 16, 2015
- Location: Berkeley, California, U.S.; 37°52′05.5″N 122°16′10.5″W
- Deaths: 7
- Injuries: 6

On June 16, 2015, shortly after midnight, five Irish J-1 visa students and one Irish-American died and seven others were injured when a balcony on which they were standing collapsed. The group was celebrating a 21st birthday party in Berkeley, California. The balcony was on the 5th floor of an eight-year-old apartment building at 2020 Kittredge Street in Berkeley, then called Library Gardens. The district attorney of Alameda County launched a criminal probe into the incident. In January 2022, one of the injured died from a stroke related to the injuries.

In June of 2015, Berkeley mayor Tom Bates initiated an investigation into the cause of the collapse. Evidence from the investigation showed the wooden joists failed due to dry rot from improper construction.

== Victims ==
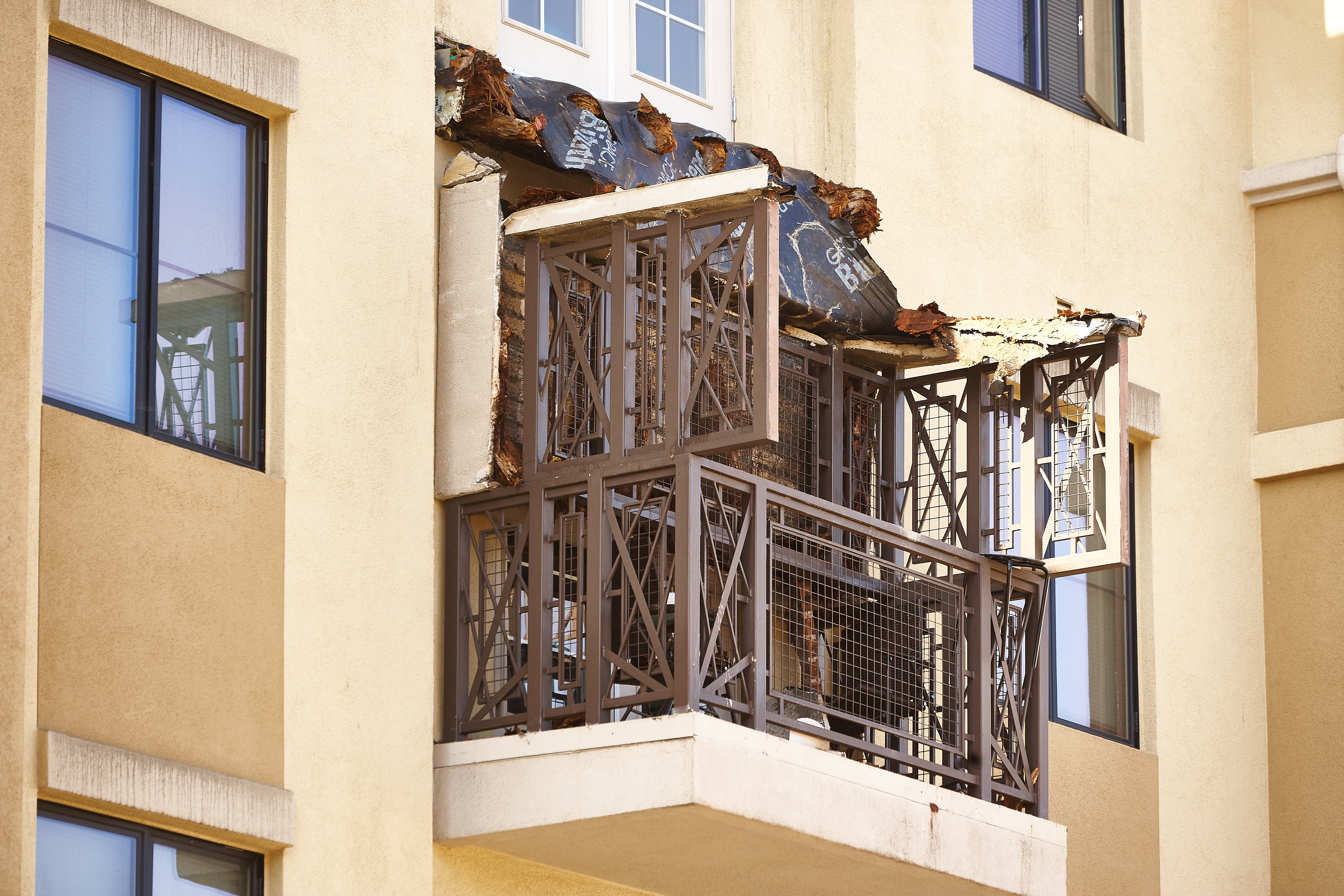
The immediate aftermath of the 2015 Berkeley balcony collapse

Six people died in the immediate aftermath of the collapse. They were identified as 22-year-old Ashley Donohoe, and Olivia Burke, Eoghan Culligan, Niccolai "Nick" Schuster, Lorcán Miller and Eimear Walsh, all aged 21. All six were Irish and from Dublin. On 2 January 2022, survivor Aoife Beary died of a stroke, the consequence of injuries sustained in the collapse.

== Investigation ==
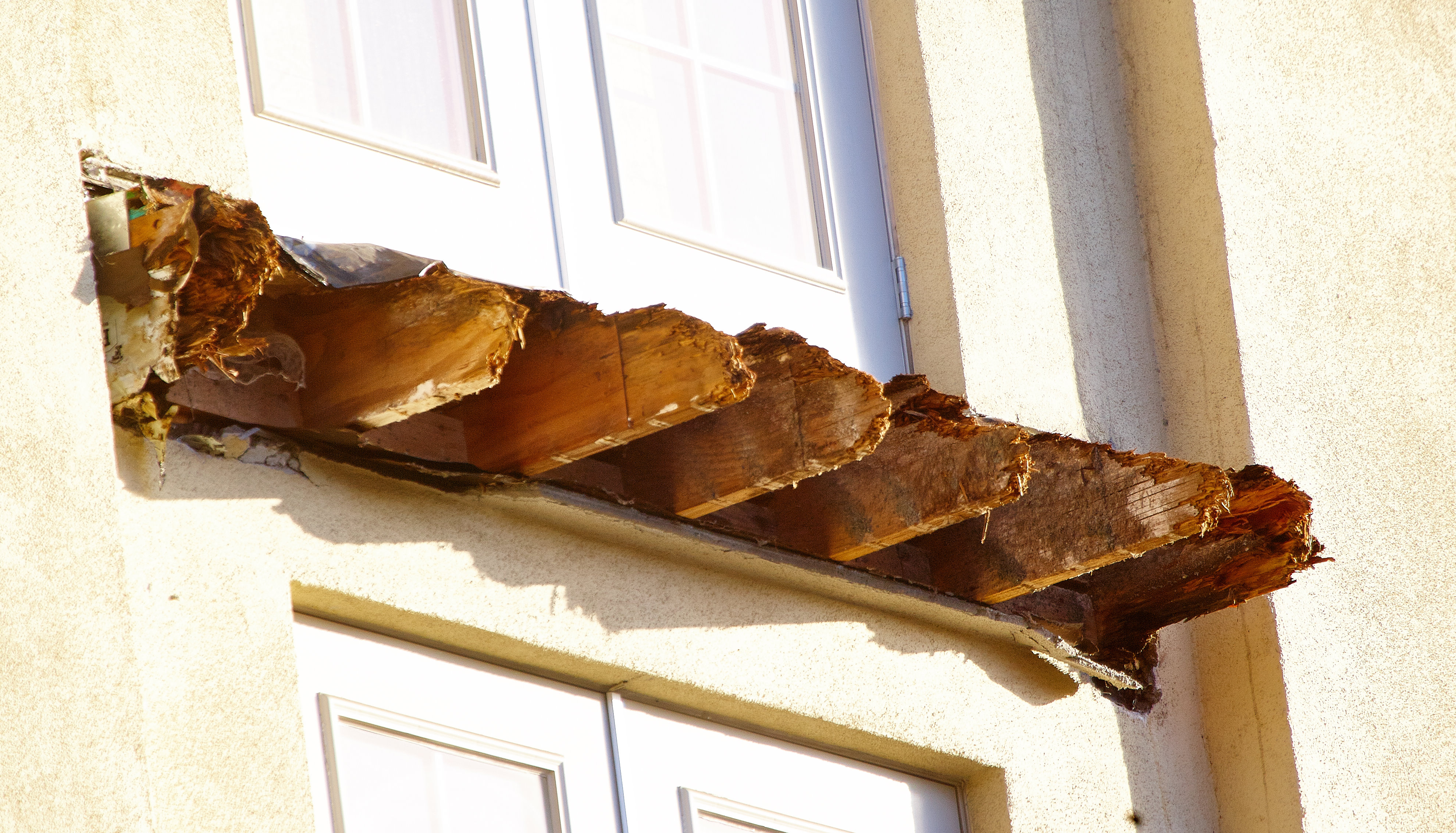
The rotted-off stubs of the LVL joists that had supported the balcony.

On June 25, Alameda County prosecutors began an investigation into the accident, stating involuntary manslaughter charges could be filed. District Attorney Nancy O'Malley denied pressure from the Irish community led to the collapse inquiry. On July 3, 2015, the Alameda County Superior Court rejected a restraining order bid by Segue Builders, a construction company, against the examination of evidence. O'Malley had argued the granting of a restraining order would interfere with her duty to investigate the tragedy.

== Aftermath ==
On September 18, 2018, a law was signed requiring inspection of a 15% sampling of exterior load-bearing structures with wooden supports on apartment buildings every 6 years.

== Funerals ==
A joint funeral service for Olivia Burke and her cousin Ashley Donohoe took place on June 20, four days after the collapse, in a church in Cotati, California. Funeral services were held in Dublin for the other victims.

== Litigation ==
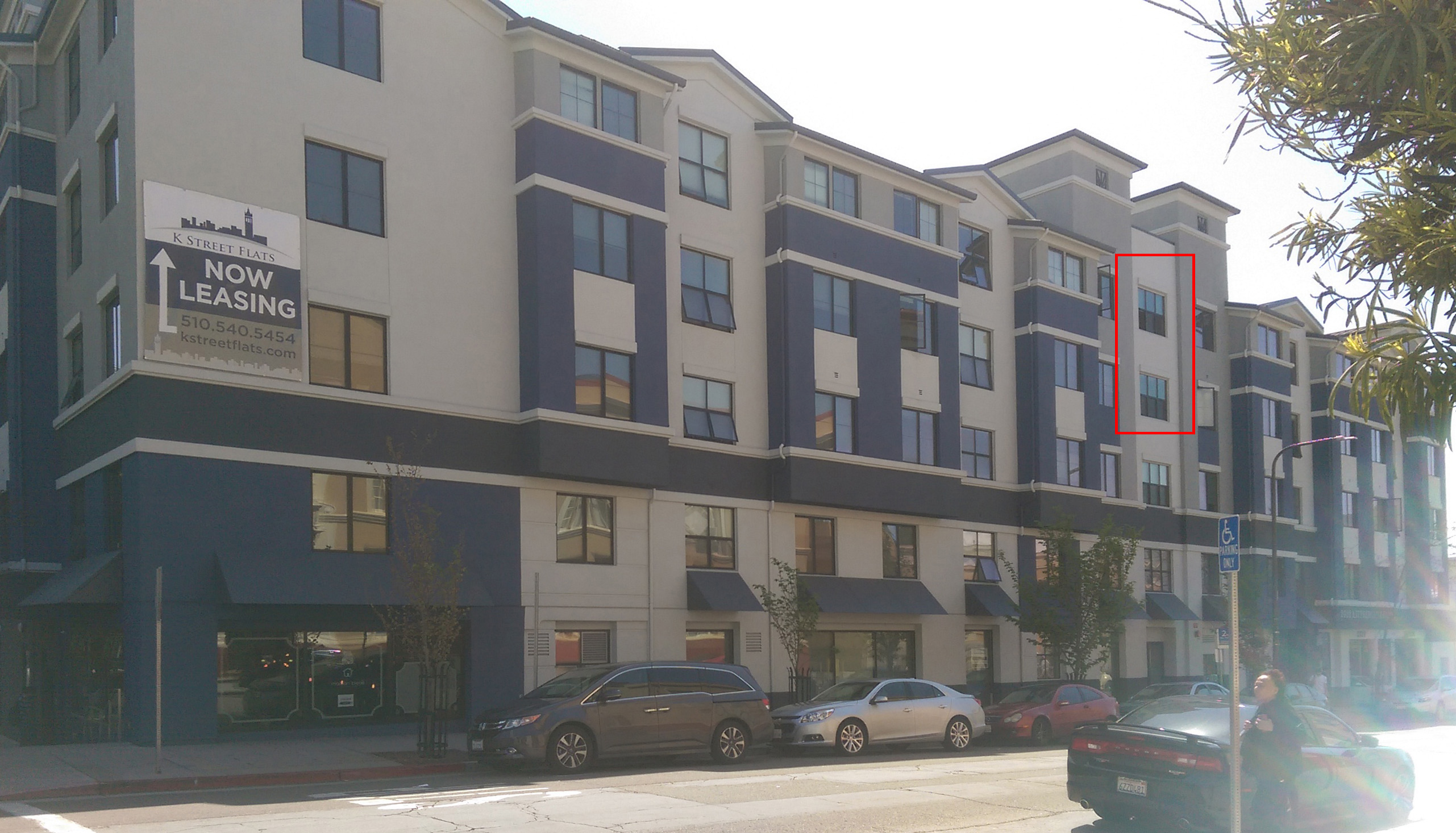
2020 Kittredge Street in 2017. The collapsed balconies were located in the area inside the red box.

In December 2015 a court was told that the collapse happened because contractors cut corners to save costs and that the management company for the building, Greystar Real Estate Partners, ignored a "red flag" when students who rented the apartment complained about mushrooms growing on the balcony. Legal cases by some of the victims were set to be combined and heard together. By the end of 2017 it was reported that most of the lawsuits had been settled.

== See also ==
- 2003 Chicago balcony collapse
