= Wiggly Field =

Dog park in Chicago, Illinois, United States

Coordinates: 41.930285°N 87.653752°W

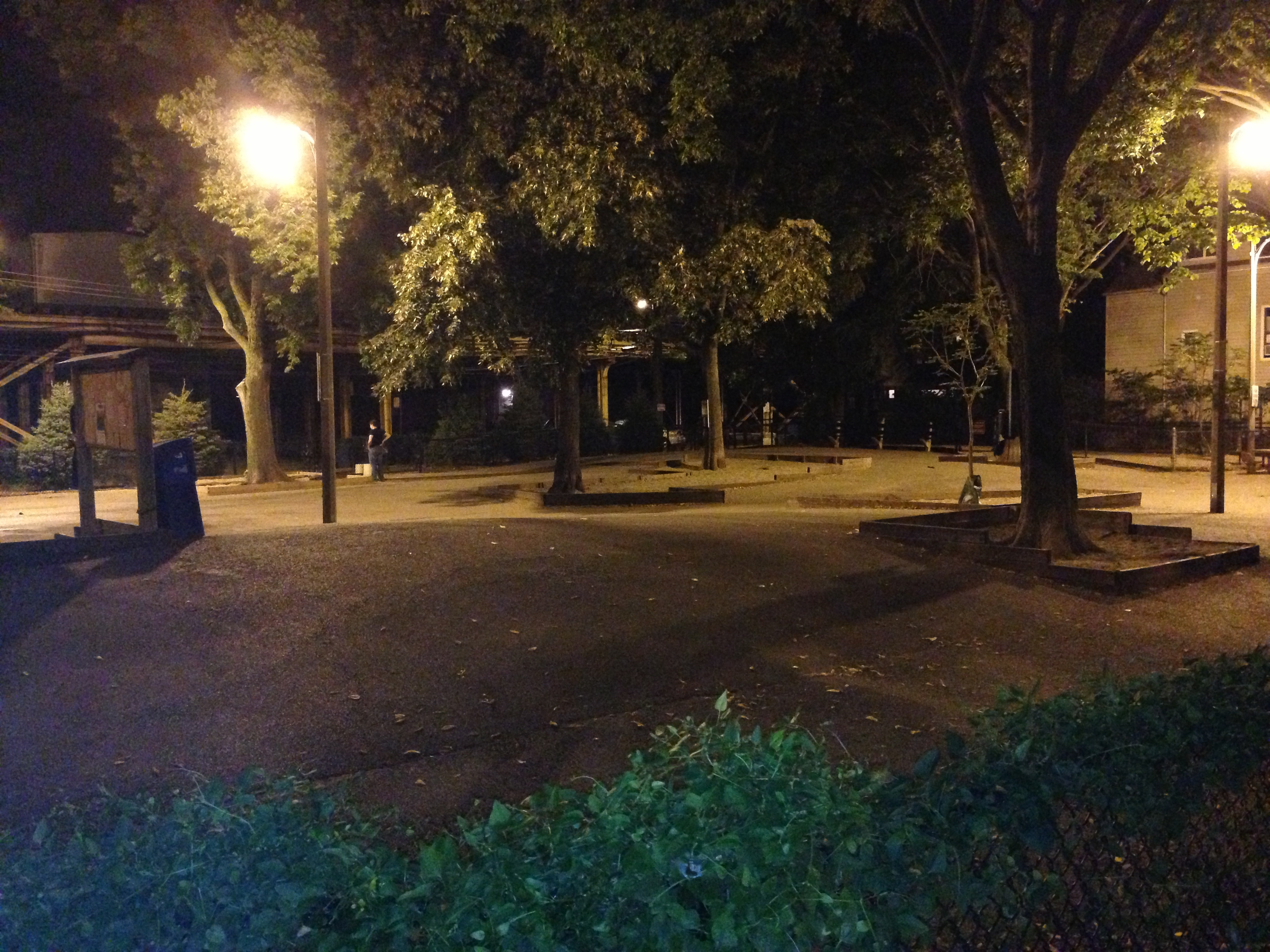
Wiggly field

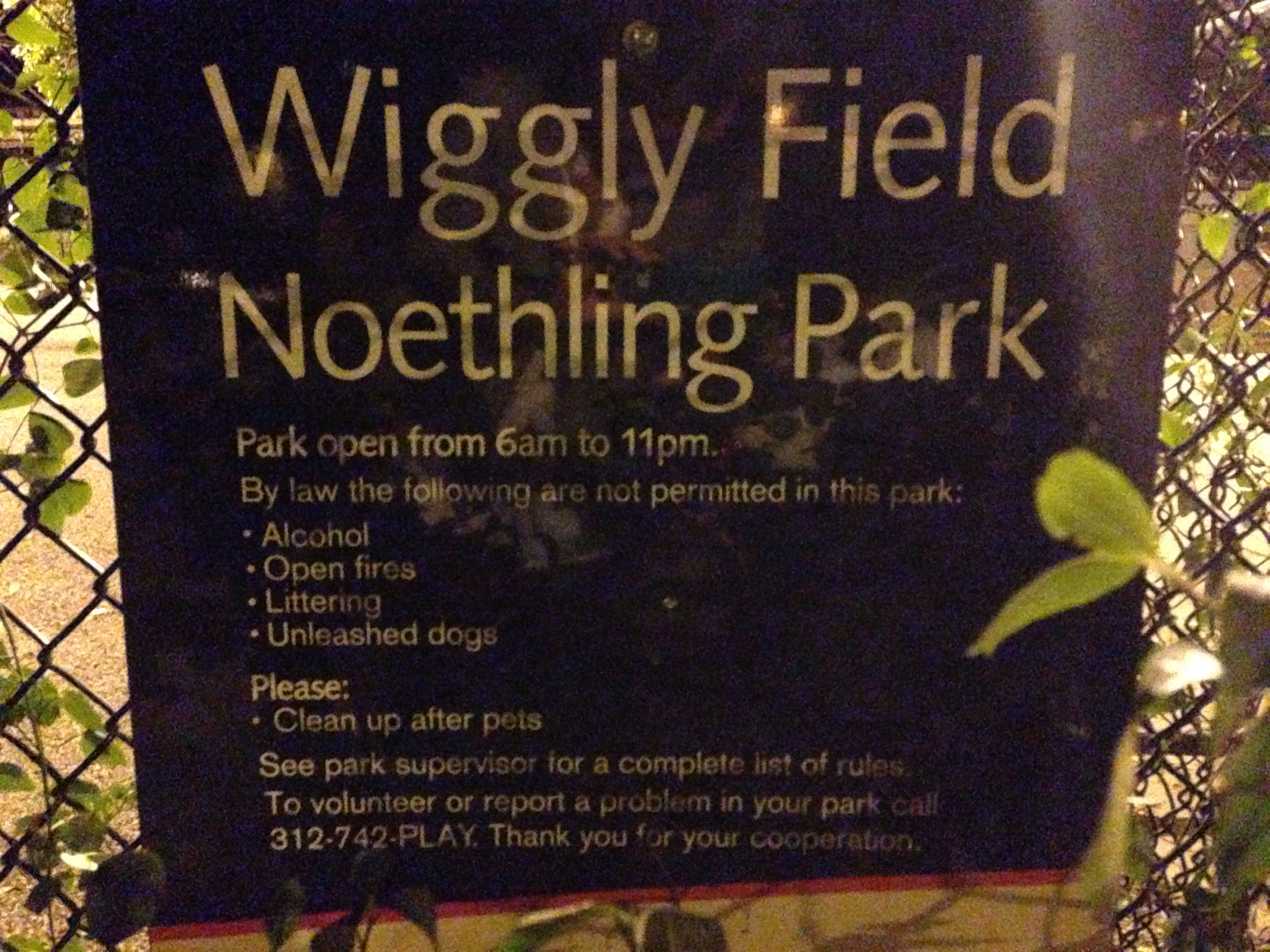
Wiggly field sign

Wiggly Field is a dog park on the north side of Chicago, Illinois. It was established in 1997. The informal name Wiggly Field is a play on words for the nearby historic baseball stadium, Wrigley Field.

Founded by Stacey Hawk, Diane Dorwart and Judy Tullman, the play area is part of Noethling Park of the Chicago Park District and is located at 2645 N. Sheffield Avenue (at Schubert Avenue) in the Wrightwood Neighbors part of the Lincoln Park neighborhood.

Wiggly Field is one of the most popular and well known of Chicago's dog parks. It has been featured on Animal Planet's show K-9 to 5, in Chicago magazine (July 1999), InStyle magazine (September 2000), Bark Magazine (Spring 2002), and Chicagoland Tails (2002). Wiggly Field was named one of the top ten US dog parks by Dog Fancy magazine readers.

Noethling Park itself was established by the Chicago Park District in 1970. It is named for Grace Noethling, founder of the Wrightwood Neighbors Conservation Association.
