= Alicia Florrick =

Fictional character in CBS television series

- The Good Wife character
- Julianna Margulies as Alicia Florrick in Season 5
- First appearance: "Pilot"; September 22, 2009
- Last appearance: "End"; May 8, 2016
- Created by: Robert King and Michelle King
- Portrayed by: Julianna Margulies

In-universe information
- Alias: Alicia Cavanaugh (birth name)
- Gender: Female
- Occupation: Attorney at law; Cook County State's Attorney (formerly); First Lady of Illinois
- Family: Veronica Loy (mother); Owen Cavanaugh (brother)
- Spouse: Peter Florrick
- Significant others: Will Gardner (soulmate, deceased); Jason Crouse (formerly)
- Children: Zach Florrick (son); Grace Florrick (daughter)
- Relatives: Jackie Florrick (mother-in-law)

Alicia Florrick (née Cavanaugh) is the lead character of CBS television series The Good Wife and is portrayed by Julianna Margulies, who has received widespread acclaim for her performance, winning two Primetime Emmy Awards for Outstanding Lead Actress in a Drama Series.

Alicia's storyline focuses on her romantic relationships, including the struggle between staying with or divorcing her unfaithful husband, Peter Florrick, or pursuing other relationships with other men, most notably Will Gardner. Other storylines include Alicia's transformation from "the victim" to "the victimizer", her dealing with the negative consequences of her actions, her devotion to her children among political turmoil, her obsession with power, and her growth in confidence. In the international The Good Wife remake for South Korea, Alicia is adapted as Kim Hye-kyung, portrayed by Jeon Do-yeon, in the remake for Ireland, Striking Out, Alicia is adapted as Tara Rafferty, portrayed by Amy Huberman, in the remake for Japan, Alicia's counterpart is portrayed by Takako Tokiwa, and in the remake for India, The Trial, Alicia is adapted as Noyonika Sengupta, portrayed by Kajol. In the Egyptian version "The Crossroads" the cognate character is Amira El Alf portrayed by Hend Sabry.

== Character biography ==
=== Background ===
Alicia Cavanaugh was born in 1967 to Veronica Cavanaugh (Stockard Channing) and an unknown father, from whom Veronica separated prior to her first appearance in the series in Season 4. She is the older sister of Owen Cavanaugh (Dallas Roberts), whom she loves very much, having grown close during their parents' separation, despite his tendency to meddle in her personal life. Her mother, now going by the name of Veronica Loy, makes her first appearance in "A Defense of Marriage" during Season 4, where it is revealed that Alicia had become estranged from her mother due to her various remarriages following her separation from Alicia's father as well as her infidelity. Veronica never afforded Alicia a motherly connection, and her father was never given the opportunity to, leading Alicia to become emotionally withdrawn, a tendency she has demonstrated frequently throughout the series. Ironically, Alicia has engaged in several of the same practices as her mother that she disapproves of, including infidelity, various relationships, and estrangement from her children.

Alicia attended Georgetown University Law Center, where she graduated at the top of her class in 1992, despite her tendency to sleep during lectures she didn't find interesting. While attending, she met and befriended Will Gardner (Josh Charles), who graduated alongside her. During their time in law school, Will and Alicia had an unofficial relationship, but never evolved into a proper relationship due to their "bad timing". Following her graduation from Georgetown, she became a junior litigator at mid-sized Chicago law firm Crozier, Abrams & Abbott, where she clocked the most billable hours of any associate. Despite that, it is mentioned that the firm wanted to fire her before she went on maternity leave because of her lack of a "killer instinct". While working there, she meets Peter Florrick (Chris Noth), another lawyer with political ambitions, whom she marries a few years later and adopts the Florrick surname. Alicia doesn't share Peter's political ambition, but accommodates his, resigning from Crozier, Abrams & Abbott to become a political "good wife" where she acts as a political instrument during campaigns and fundraisers. For this role, she receives the moniker of "Saint Alicia", a label she initially finds irritating, but later comes to think of as humorous. The two eventually move to Highland Park, an upscale neighborhood in the Chicago suburbs where she and Peter raise Zachary "Zach" Florrick (Graham Phillips), and Grace Florrick (Makenzie Vega). She befriends her neighbors, but quickly becomes ostracized following a highly publicized sex scandal concerning her husband, the incumbent State's Attorney for Cook County, Illinois.

Months prior to the series, a political rival of Peter's, Glenn Childs (Titus Welliver), who had his sights set on Peter's job, leaks a sex tape of Peter and Amber Madison (Kim Shaw), a Chicago escort. The tape raises questions over whether Peter abused his office, with accusations of trading political favors for sexual services and material items being lobbied against him. The story first breaks on CNBC, and Alicia immediately shields her children from all news stations. Peter resigns in order to avoid impeachment, but is ultimately convicted of charges of corruption, leading Alicia to believe that she, as well as her children, had become collateral damage in a political feud between Peter and Childs. Upon his resignation, Alicia slaps Peter for victimizing her and their children.

Having been out of the workforce for nearly a decade, and left with no income, Alicia assumes the role of breadwinner of the Florrick family. She, Zach, and Grace move to a condo in inner Chicago while she searches for a new job, which she has trouble doing due to her family's damaged reputation. Eventually, she reconnects with Will, who is now a name partner at Chicago law firm Stern, Lockhart, & Gardner. He offers her a job at his firm, which she accepts, but soon comes to learn that the position offered to her was already filled by a younger, Harvard-educated lawyer, Cary Agos (Matt Czuchry). Being a friend of Will's, he and another name partner, Diane Lockhart (Christine Baranski), organize an arrangement by which the two will compete for the job and, in six months, one will be laid off.

=== Work life at Lockhart/Gardner ===
Alicia is designated the role by Diane of being "the branch between the legal and political", using her husband, who then resides in a county prison, to solicit information on cases she is working, much to the displeasure of judges, who view this practice as unethical. She is shown to be a competent lawyer, which allows her to keep her job at Lockhart/Gardner, resulting in a vindictive Cary being laid off. As a consequence, Alicia becomes the target of attacks by Cary, now working under Glenn at the State's Attorney's office. While separated from Peter, Alicia rekindled her relationship with Will Gardner but eventually breaks it off when it becomes difficult to separate their work and professional lives.

Lockhart/Gardner enters financial trouble in the fourth season, finding itself hundreds of millions of dollars in debt. Will and Diane hire an accountant (Clark Hayden) to ensure the firm remains solvent, but he soon becomes overzealous in his efforts and over-invested in the firm's financial survival that he attempts to remove Will and Diane as name partner following their inability to repay debts to their shareholders in a timely manner. In an effort to quickly raise capital for their repayments, Will and Diane offer Alicia a partnership at the firm. Believing this to be a reward for her efforts and success, Alicia is overjoyed to become a partner, but becomes furious when she learned that this had only been an attempt to raise money, as a partnership had been offered to all fourth-year associates, including a newly rehired Cary.

Cary proposed that he and Alicia begin their own firm, and take the other fourth year associates, as well as one of the in-house investigators, with them. While initially rejecting this offer, she begins to grow sympathetic to this idea due to her contempt for other employees at Lockhart/Gardner. Eventually the board makes her a partner in order to break the alliance between the fourth year associates.

=== Leaving Lockhart/Gardner ===
Beginning in season five, Alicia and Cary conspire to leave Lockhart/Gardner and poach several big-name clients for themselves. While downloading documents for ongoing cases they intend to continue litigating at Florrick/Agos, Diane discovers her plot, and informs Will, who confiscates her laptop and cellphone. Will promptly fires Alicia and Cary, as well as all others who have been attempting to poach Lockhart/Gardner clients.

Will, betrayed due to the generosity he extended to Alicia, becomes reinvigorated, and initiates an expansion of Lockhart/Gardner into the east and west coast. However, Alicia utilizes Peter, who had been released from prison and subsequently elected governor of Illinois, to continue poaching clients. In one instance, Peter threatens to apply sales tax to the Internet and Internet-based companies in a subtle warning to ChumHum (a spoof of Google) that, should they not hire Florrick/Agos as their civil litigator firm, he will hurt their business. The two firms continue to feud while Florrick/Agos find their footing, eventually renting an old T-shirt factory to work out of after spending weeks in Alicia's apartment. However, following Will's death, Diane and Alicia and Cary reunite to form Florrick/Agos & Lockhart. Eventually Cary and Diane hire David Lee back to work at the firm after he becomes frustrated working with former rival David Canning. Alicia is frustrated at this but admits she has been absentee due to the State's attorney race.

Alicia returns to work at Lockhart, Agos, & Lee following her withdrawal from the state's attorney race, and on her first day back, her former coworkers stall her in a room so that they may poach remaining clients that left the firm when Alicia resigned. Diane states that she wanted to hire Alicia back but that the scandal from her race would chase away several major clients. When Alicia discovers this, she proposes starting a law firm with Finn Polmar (Matthew Goode), an unofficial significant other who she hired at Florrick, Agos, and Lockhart after he became disillusioned with the States Attorneys office. These plans fall through when Finn leaves town to rekindle his relationship with his ex-wife, so Alicia, in search of employment, becomes a bond court lawyer. There, she meets and befriends Lucca Quinn (Cush Jumbo), a fellow bond court lawyer. The two begin their own law firm, but this is eventually dissolved when both of them are hired by Lockhart, Agos, & Lee. Diane, over the objections of Cary, makes Alicia a name partner in a bid to make a female-led firm. Cary, after a feud with Diane over Alicia's position, resigns to become a guest lecturer at a local college, sick of office politics he has been embroiled in over the past three years. Diane and Alicia eventually remove David Lee (Zach Grenier) as a name partner, and the two become the name partners of a female-led law firm.

Alicia made no appearances on The Good Fight, but it was revealed that she resigned from Florrick & Lockhart within a year of the firm's readjustment.

=== Politics ===
The name of the show is a reference to Alicia's position within Peter's life: the political good wife. Her role is solely to bolster Peter's political career, a job she continues to do following Peter's release from prison. However, while she tolerates the political spotlight, she refuses to let her children be exploited for the same purposes, which often leads to conflict between her and Eli Gold (Alan Cumming), Peter's campaign manager, who sees Zach and Grace as effective political props.

At the end of season five, Eli, now Peter's chief of staff, proposes she run for state's attorney of Cook County, the office her husband previously occupied. While initially rejecting this offer, Alicia acquiesces due to her objections regarding the incumbent states attorney's abuse of power. The incumbent eventually departs from the race, and Alicia, instead, runs opposed to Frank Prady (David Hyde Pierce), a television legal analyst. Initially, Alicia and Prady form an alliance in which they both agree not to resort to personal attacks. However, things get complicated when both of their campaigns release disparaging ads against their wishes: Alicia is accused of being unethical and open to political favors for her past clients and Prady is accused of being a gay closeted-Republican. Alicia is also seen lying to influential Cook County figures in order to secure their endorsements. These lies included denying knowledge that Lemond Bishop (Mike Colter), infamous drug kingpin and serial killer, donated to her campaign, when she had already been made aware of the fact that Bishop had set up her PAC, as well as suggesting that Prady is gay to a homophobic Democratic donor in order to acquire funds.

Alicia eventually wins the election, but is forced to resign by Mike Landau (Mike Pniewski), head of the Illinois Democratic Party. After reports of voter fraud surface, Landau reveals to Alicia that he rigged the voting machines in order to preserve the Democratic supermajority in the Illinois state legislature. However, in order to maintain the façade of a fair election, Landau forces Alicia to resign.

In the seventh season, Peter runs for president in hopes of becoming Hillary Clinton’s vice president. Alicia continues to support him, however, Peter comes in fourth in the Iowa caucuses, so any hope of him being tapped for the nomination is destroyed. Alicia's exit from politics seems complete.

=== Finale ===
The seventh season finds Peter accused of destroying evidence in the murder trial of a wealthy Democratic donor's son during his tenure as state's attorney. Alicia agrees to forestall their divorce until after the trial so as to not give the impression that he may be guilty, however, she would pursue a divorce if Peter is acquitted.

Desperate to acquit Peter so she may divorce him and pursue her relationship with Jason Crouse (Jeffrey Dean Morgan), Alicia, Diane, and Lucca pursue the strategy of proving Peter had no reason to discard the evidence because the donor's son wasn't guilty. Diane's husband, Kurt McVeigh (Gary Cole), a ballistics expert, had originally testified that the bullets did not come from the donor's son's gun. However, the bullets, which had suspiciously disappeared at that time, were found to be simply misplaced after the crime lab was thoroughly searched. They were retested using newer scientific methods by another ballistics expert, Holly, Kurt's protégé (and the new buyer for his business), who testified that the bullets DID come from the donor's son's gun. Alicia, anxious to refute this testimony (and against Diane's strong objection) calls Kurt back to the stand to contradict Holly's testimony. However, after retesting the bullets himself, Kurt realizes the bullets did come from that gun. He testifies to this and Lucca, in an effort to discredit him (at Alicia's request), accuses him of changing his testimony to protect Holly because they had an affair (while married to Diane).

Diane is devastated. She attends Peter's resignation and approaches Alicia afterward, slaps her hard across the face, and walks away without a word. This scene was significant to writers Robert and Michelle King, who saw this as symbolizing Alicia's transition from the "victimized" to the "victimizer." They considered that Alicia was acting out of maternal concern during the trial, as she didn't want Grace to put her future on hold because of her father. But, according to the writers Alicia had, in effect, become Peter. She morphed from a purist, at home and in the law, into someone who cheated on her spouse, blurred ethical lines, and became quite hardened.

== Adaptations ==
=== Tara Rafferty ===
In the international The Good Wife remake Striking Out, Alicia is adapted as Tara Rafferty, portrayed by Amy Huberman.

=== Other series ===
In the international The Good Wife remakes:

- In South Korea, in The Good Wife, Alicia was adapted as Kim Hye-kyung, portrayed by Jeon Do-yeon.
- In Japan, in The Good Wife, Alicia was adapted as Kyoko Hasumi, portrayed by Takako Tokiwa.
- In Russia, in Khoroshaya zhena, Alicia was adapted as Alice Fillipova, portrayed by Alexandra Ursuliak.
- In India, in The Trial, Alicia was adapted as Noyonika Sengupta, portrayed by Kajol.
- In China, in Rose War, Alicia was adapted as Gu Nian, portrayed by Yuan Quan.
- In Vietnam, in Hành trình công lý, Alicia was adapted as Trần Anh Phương, portrayed by Hồng Diễm.
- In Egypt, in Moftaraq Toroq, Alicia was adapted as Amira El Alf, portrayed by Hend Sabry.

== Reception ==
The characterization of Alicia has received critical acclaim, with many favorable comparisons being drawn between her, The Sopranos' Tony Soprano, Breaking Bad's Walter White, and Mad Men's Don Draper. Writing for Vanity Fair, Joanna Robinson writes, "While Alicia took her final bow in an era when the ice zombies on Game of Thrones and the sweaty zombies on The Walking Dead rule pop-culture, Alicia Florrick belongs to the time of Walter White, Don Draper, and the other stars of the golden age of the TV antihero." However, Robinson highlights the difference between Alicia and other anti-heroes, writing "Alicia ends up more callous than either Walter White (who at least went out apologizing to Skyler and saving Pinkman) or Don Draper (who, hey, bought the world a Coke!). Alicia throws Diane right under the bus in a way that the Kings describe as 'collateral damage.' The most charitable interpretation we can come up with is that at least Alicia was partially thinking of Grace as she did it".

Margulies has received critical acclaim for her performance as Alicia Florrick. In his initial review of the series, Rob Owen of Pittsburgh Post-Gazette praised Margulies' performance, calling the show "a terrific showcase for actress Julianna Margulies, who elevates the already-good material with her perceptive, open performance."

Daniel Fienberg of The Hollywood Reporter also praised Margulies' performance, writing that "the excellence of Margulies' performance has rested in her refusal to make Alicia easy to understand, in keeping up a complicated wall and choosing those few moments in which to expose emotional cracks." And later compared her performance to those of James Gandolfini on The Sopranos or Bryan Cranston on Breaking Bad, writing that "Margulies' performance sometimes put Alicia in that Tony Soprano/Walter White/Don Draper category of cable anti-heroes."

=== Accolades ===
For her performance, Margulies won a Critics' Choice Television Award, a Golden Globe Award, two Primetime Emmy Awards, two Screen Actors Guild Awards, and a Television Critics Association Award.
