= Tara Rafferty =

Fictional character

- Striking Out character
- First appearance: Series 1, Episode 1; 1 January 2017
- Created by: James Phelan
- Based on: Alicia Florrick by Robert and Michelle King
- Portrayed by: Amy Huberman

In-universe information
- Occupation: Solicitor
- Affiliation: Vincent Pike; George Cusack; Ray Lamont
- Family: Irene Rafferty (mother); Conrad Rafferty (father)
- Significant others: Eric Dunbar; Sam Dunbar
- Nationality: Irish

Tara Rafferty is the lead character in Irish legal drama Striking Out, based on The Good Wife and its lead character Alicia Florrick, created by Robert and Michelle King. Tara is shown as a solicitor who goes out on her own after breaking up with her fiancée. Tara is the central character of the show. Tara is played by actress Amy Huberman. Huberman was nominated and won an IFTA award for her role as Tara in 2017. Tara's main storylines within the show have centred around her establishing herself as a lawyer on her own after she leaves the inner circle of Dunbar and Calloway solicitors due to end her engagement with her fiancée Eric.

== Development ==
On June 20, 2016, a 4-part English language remake of The Good Wife by Robert and Michelle King, was ordered on RTÉ One under the working title Cheaters, starring Amy Huberman as Tara Rafferty, a character based on Julianna Margulies's Alicia Florrick. with the series ultimately being retitled Striking Out.

Prior to the series starting, Huberman described Tara as "a woman who feels she has everything going for her and then finds the rug being pulled from under her, both professionally and emotionally." Huberman later said that in her role you can be "voyeuristic".

In an interview Tara said about her character "Listen, I’m really happy to be playing a lead in a show, that she has a lot to do, she has important stuff to do in a legal capacity, she’s a strong character who has her flaws and has her strengths. You see both of them, and see that’s important as well that someone – especially a female character – can be flawed like male characters, with wins and losses and everything. I feel really grateful to be playing her."

Huberman explained in an interview about Series 2, "Amy Huberman: Even though she derailed, Tara found her feet on her own, and that independence fueled something in her that ended up meaning a lot more to her. I think she, in retrospect, looked at her life, and even though she thought that she had been happy, questioned what that happiness was. So we see her recovery, and even though she's still raw with the wounds of what happened, I think she's massively grateful."

== Storylines ==
Tara is first introduced at her hen party before she marries fiancée Eric Dunbar (Rory Keenan). When she comes home from her hen party she finds Eric in bed having sex with Caroline (Natalie Radmall-Quirke) who is one of their colleagues. Tara ends the engagement with Eric and quits her job at his family firm. She then has to defend Ray Lamont (Emmet Byrne) who was caught trying to get a passport while already being out on bail. She successfully gets him keeping his bail. Tara then has to help a celebrity who had a sex tape leaked. She enlists Meg Reilly (Fiona O'Shaughnessy a private investigator to help her find where the sex tape was made. Tara then tries to assist an old friend who is being evicted from her home by her sister, Tara initially believes that the sister has no reason to evict her but soon learns differently. Due to helping her friend, Tara has to ask her mentor Vincent Pike (Neil Morrissey) to deal with Ray's trial. Tara then takes on a bigamy case after a man is admitted to hospital. She reluctantly uses the man's son to win the case for the wife who truly loved the bigamist. Tara then is asked by Ray to defend his friend who has had his child taken away by social services. Tara learns that the child was taken away due to drugs being in the home. Tara successfully gets custody of the child to its father but then finds that Pete who owned the cafe where she was operating out of has been evicted due to breach of contract she learns that the Dunbar family are still out to get her. Tara briefly goes on a date with Pete (Brahm Gallagher) but it doesn't go anywhere. She is then shocked to find that Ray has been arrested and that she has been betrayed by Meg.

In the second season, after saying her goodbyes to Pete, Tara enlists Eric to help her bring down his father. Tara rents office space from solicitor George Cusack (Maria Doyle Kennedy) who in turn helps her get Ray out of jail. Tara confronts Meg about her betrayal to which Meg makes clear that Tara isn't the person she exclusively works for. Tara helps a father get custody of his daughter from a cult by unwillingly destroying the mother in court. Tara is forced to face her demons with Caroline when Caroline is representing the Catholic church in a case where a former nun is suing them. Tara and Caroline have a talk in a hotel bar but don't sort out their differences. Tara then takes on a case with a man claiming to have whiplash. She initially believes him but then doubts him and she reluctantly calls Meg in to investigate. Meg finds proof that the man was telling the truth so Tara gets an out of court settlement but is disturbed to learn that the man actually was committing fraud when Meg finds evidence to the contrary to what was found earlier. Later on Tara is shocked to learn that Vincent's inquiry that she was helping out on is being suspended because it is believed she has a conflict of interest. After a fight with Eric, Tara ends up having sex with his brother Sam (Moe Dunford). Tara helps Barry O'Brien the bigamist again when one of his wives is looking financial retribution over her split with him. Tara gives advice to his son Finbar who is unhappy with all the fighting between his parents which helps her get a resolution. After a meal with Vincent an unknown person was photographing her giving Vincent a kiss on the cheek as a goodbye.

== Reception ==
In 2017 Amy Huberman won an IFTA award for her role as Tara. She was also nominated in 2018 but lost out to Caitriona Balfe. Liam Fay of The Times called Tara a "fluffy hero" of the drama. James Williams that Tara was played so well by Huberman.
