= The Trial (Indian TV series) =

Indian legal drama web-series

- Genre: Legal drama; Political drama
- Based on: The Good Wife by: Robert King; Michelle King
- Written by: Hussain Dalal; Abbas Dalal; Siddharth Kumar
- Directed by: Season 1: Suparn Varma; Season 2: Umesh Bist
- Starring: Kajol; Jisshu Sengupta; Kubbra Sait; Sheeba Chaddha; Alyy Khan; Gaurav Pandey
- Theme music composer: Sangeet-Siddharth
- Country of origin: India
- Original language: Hindi
- No. of seasons: 2
- No. of episodes: 14

Production
- Executive producers: Season 1: Suparn Verma; Season 2: Umesh Bist; Tarunima Varma; Vijay Tiwari; Manish Goswami
- Producers: Ajay Devgn; Deepak Dhar; Rajesh Chadha; Parag Desai
- Cinematography: Season 1: Manoj Soni; Season 2: Kuldeep Mamania
- Running time: 39–46 minutes
- Production companies: Banijay Asia; Ajay Devgn FFilms

Original release
- Network: Disney+ Hotstar
- Release: 14 July 2023 – present

The Trial: Pyaar Kaanoon Dhokha is an Indian legal drama television series streaming on Disney+ Hotstar. It is an adaptation of Robert King and Michelle King's The Good Wife and features Kajol in the lead role. The series is centered on a housewife who, after 10 years, starts working at a law firm to support her family when her husband gets imprisoned.

The series was announced in July 2022 with principal photography commencing the following month. It was released on Disney+ Hotstar on 14 July 2023. The second season was announced to be released 19 September 2025.

== Premise ==
=== Season 1 ===
Noyonika Sengupta, a law school graduate, is a housewife who gave up her career to look after her children. When her husband, Rajeev Sengupta, is arrested for a sex and corruption scandal, she starts working as a junior lawyer at a law firm to support her family. Noyonika now has to balance both her work and family life while also having to deal with the humiliation she faces from her husband's scandal.

=== Season 2 ===
Season 2 picks up three months after the events of the first season. Noyonika Sengupta (Kajol) has grown more confident as a lawyer, but her personal life remains unsettled. Her marriage with Rajiv (Jisshu Sengupta) is strained, and their daughters struggle with the constant conflict at home.

As Noyonika takes on a series of challenging legal cases—including a sexual assault accusation, a high-profile influencer’s attempted murder charge, and negligence involving unsafe construction—she faces mounting pressure at her law firm, where new partner Param Munjal disrupts the balance of power. Meanwhile, Rajiv announces his entry into politics, bringing the Sengupta family into the spotlight. His opponent, Narayani Bhole, escalates a political rivalry that intertwines with Noyonika’s professional and personal struggles.

The season moves beyond courtroom battles to explore political ambition, public perception, and private betrayals. Noyonika eventually learns of Rajiv’s past affair with her friend Sana, leaving her feeling doubly betrayed. In the finale, Rajiv wins the election, and Noyonika decides to divorce him, asserting her independence and prioritizing her children’s future. At the law firm, Param is removed, restoring stability. The season ends on an open note, as Noyonika contemplates a new chapter in her life while still being tethered to her past.

== Cast ==
=== Main ===
- Kajol as Noyonika Sengupta
- Jisshu Sengupta as Rajiv Sengupta: Noyonika's husband
- Alyy Khan as Vishal Chaubey: A name partner at the firm and Noyonika’s old friend.
- Sheeba Chaddha as Malini Khanna: A name partner at the firm
- Aseem Hattangadi as Illyas Khan: Family friend of the Senguptas.
- Kubbra Sait as Sana Shaikh / Aanchal: A consultant at the firm
- Gaurav Pandey as Dheeraj Paswan: A public prosecutor and former lawyer at the firm

=== Recurring ===
- Shruti Bhist (S1) and Myra Singh (S2) as Ananya Sengupta: Noyonika and Rajeev's older daughter
- Suhani Juneja as Anaira Sengupta: Noyonika and Rajeev's younger daughter
- Beena Banerjee as Seema Sengupta: Rajiv's mother.
- Karanvir Sharma as Param Munjal: A name partner at the firm
- Kunal Thakur as Sunny aka Sunil Rathore
- Sonali Kulkarni as Narayani Dhole
- Kenneth Desai as Ketan Patel
- Priyank Tatariya as Mohan Jaykar
- Pamela Bhutoria as Chitrangada Sharma
- Santanu Ghatak as Shumon
- Asrani as Navroz Electricwala
- Aamir Ali as Pradeep Shinde: Police officer and Sana's love interest.
- Atul Kumar as Daksh Rathod: TV news reporter
- Manasvi Mamgai as Juhi Bhatia
- Rituraj Singh as Sharad Jhadav
- Kiran Kumar as Kishore Ahuja: A name partner at the firm.
- Aditi Singh as Tina / Latika Kalra
- Shyam Kishore as Bharat Mishra: Rajiv's lawyer.

=== Episodic ===
- Arjun Kachroo as Rajat Kakkar
- Suchitra Pillai as Shivani Bahl
- Vijay Vikram Singh as Takesh
- Flora Saini as Anisha Menon
- Aiman Sheikh as Twinkle Soni
- Sanatana Roach as Shanaya Qureshi
- Isha Sandhir as Raabiya Qureshi
- Ria Nalwade as Pernia Khattar
- Ramakant Dayma as Judge Thakore
- Sukhita Iyer as Judge Lata Iyer
- Adithi Kalkunte as Mrs. Joshi
- Abhiraj Chawla as Yash
- Pradnya Motghare as Priya
- Ranjit Deval as Mr. Kriplani
- Reena Agarwal as Arundhati Sharma
- Swayam Joshi
- Haelyn Shastri
- Sheena Chohan as Jasmin Lobo
- Nirbhay Jain
- Nancy Gill as Kavya Bola
- Aparna Menon as Rose Mathews

== Production ==
=== Season 1 ===
A collaboration between Disney+ Hotstar and Kajol was announced in July 2022 with a teaser video revealing an untitled series. In August, shooting commenced at Juhu Studios in Mumbai where a set was built depicting an office setting. On 8 September 2022, the first look was released, announcing the title as well as the show being an adaptation of the American series of the same name. The motion poster was released on 9 June 2023, with the trailer on 12 June announcing the release date of 14 July.

== Release ==
The Trial season 1 released on Disney+ Hotstar on 14 July 2023 and season 2 released on 19 September 2025.

== Critical reception ==
The show has received mostly mixed reviews from critics.

Anuj Kumar of The Hindu opined, "The makers have looked beyond the obvious faces that dot the OTT space these days and have brought back some lesser-seen powerhouses."

Shubhra Gupta of The Indian Express opined, "For the second season, can we expect smoother writing, less choppy situations, and please, none of those sonorous voice-overs which feel like they were written as bumper-sticker lines to the wise?"

Saibal Chatterjee of NDTV gave a mixed review and rated the series 3 stars out of 5, stating, "Not everything in this world is by the book. One of the key characters in The Trial avers that a lawyer's job is to defend a client, not the truth."

Critic Deepa Gahlot reviewed the series for Scroll.in stating, "Kajol is given annoying internal pop-philosophical monologues about love, trust, destiny and faith."

Santanu Das of Hindustan Times felt the dialogue is poor and wrote, "None of the performances land, even the always-reliable Sheeba Chaddha meets the fate of a poorly written boss-lady archetype."

Tushar Joshi of India Today wrote, "On the flip side, the score and music sounds outdated and some of the dialogues stand out as a sore thumb in an otherwise modern setting. There is a lack of cohesiveness between the episodes and you need to be patient to make it to the point where the actual fun starts."

A critic from Rediff.com wrote, "Blame it on my expectations, but we've seen far more absorbing and closer-to-life court room dramas in recent times – the slow burn Criminal Justice, spirited Guilty Minds and, of course, the glitzy Suits being one of my all-time favourites."

Pinkvilla gave a mixed review, saying, "The Trial counts for a nice weekend binge despite few clichéd tropes and plot conveniences."
