= The Bite (TV series) =

American television series

- Genre: Drama; Science fiction; Horror
- Created by: Robert King; Michelle King
- Starring: Audra McDonald; Taylor Schilling; Steven Pasquale; Phillipa Soo; Will Swenson; Leslie Uggams
- Country of origin: United States
- Original language: English
- No. of seasons: 1
- No. of episodes: 6

Production
- Executive producers: Robert King; Michelle King; Liz Glotzer; Brooke Kennedy
- Production companies: King Size Productions; CBS Studios

Original release
- Network: Spectrum
- Release: May 21, 2021

The Bite is an American television series created by Robert King and Michelle King. A satirical drama about coronavirus, it premiered on May 21, 2021, on Spectrum Originals.

== Premise ==
A fictional, host mutational and socially homicidal strain of the SARS CoV-2 virus arrives with the second wave of the COVID-19 pandemic in New York.

== Cast ==
- Audra McDonald as Rachel Boutella
- Taylor Schilling as Lily Leithauser
- Steven Pasquale as Dr. Zach
- Phillipa Soo as Cydni Estereo
- Ryan Spahn as Joel
- Michael Urie as Josh
- Will Swenson as Brian Ritter
- Leslie Uggams as Hester Boutella

== Episodes ==
| No. | Title | Directed by | Written by | Original release date |
|---|---|---|---|---|
| 1 | "The First Wave" | Brooke Kennedy | Robert King & Michelle King | May 21, 2021 |
| 2 | "The Second Wave" | Lonny Price | Robert King & Michelle King | May 21, 2021 |
| 3 | "The Third Wave" | Michael Trim | Robert King & Michelle King | May 21, 2021 |
| 4 | "The Fourth Wave" | Brooke Kennedy | Robert King & Michelle King | May 21, 2021 |
| 5 | "The Fifth Wave" | Nikki M. James | Robert King & Michelle King | May 21, 2021 |
| 6 | "The Sixth Wave" | Viet Nguyen | Robert King & Michelle King | May 21, 2021 |
