= Striking Out =

- Genre: Legal drama
- Created by: James Phelan
- Based on: The Good Wife by Robert and Michelle King
- Directed by: Lisa James Larsson; Simon Massey
- Starring: Amy Huberman; Neil Morrissey; Rory Keenan; Fiona O’Shaughnessy; Emmet Byrne; Brahm Gallagher; Paul Antony-Barber; Maria Doyle Kennedy; Moe Dunford
- Theme music composer: Jack C. Arnold
- Country of origin: Ireland
- Original language: English
- No. of series: 2
- No. of episodes: 10

Production
- Executive producer: Shane Murphy
- Producer: Katie Holly
- Production location: Dublin
- Cinematography: Frida Wendel
- Running time: 60 minutes

Original release
- Network: RTÉ One; G2KTV (2020)
- Release: 1 January 2017 – 11 February 2018

Striking Out is an Irish television legal drama television series, broadcast on RTÉ, that first aired on 1 January 2017, based on The Good Wife by Robert and Michelle King. Produced by Bl!nder F!lms for RTÉ Television, Striking Out stars Amy Huberman as Dublin-based solicitor Tara Rafferty, who is currently working for a fledgling legal firm. Filmed in Dublin and Wicklow, the first series, comprising four episodes, was broadcast during January 2017, to critical acclaim. Subsequently, the series was sold to the United States, where it made its North American debut on Acorn TV on 17 March 2017. Internationally, the series has been distributed by DCD Rights and Acorn Media Enterprises.

The series drew the highest Sunday night ratings for RTÉ in over a year. Prior to the broadcast of the first episode, RTÉ's Head of Drama Jane Gogan confirmed to the Irish Examiner that a second series was already in development. Subsequently, a second series was officially confirmed by RTÉ, with filming taking place throughout the summer of 2017. The second series, extended to six episodes, commenced broadcasting in 2018, with Maria Doyle Kennedy, Moe Dunford and Jane Brennan amongst the new cast members. Simon Massey will also act as the director. In 2018, Channel 5 Broadcasting Ltd acquired the rights to air the series in the United Kingdom, with the first series airing on the newly launched 5Select from 13 February 2018.

There are currently no plans to develop a third season of the drama, despite the 'cliff hanger' ending of season 2.

== Synopsis ==
Striking Out follows the professional and personal life of Dublin-based solicitor Tara Rafferty.

== Cast ==
=== Main cast ===
- Amy Huberman as Tara Rafferty; a Dublin-based solicitor
- Neil Morrissey as Vincent Pike; SC and close friend of Tara's
- Rory Keenan as Eric Dunbar; Tara's cheating ex-fiancé and former colleague
- Fiona O'Shaughnessy as Meg Reilly; a private investigator and tech guru
- Emmet Byrne as Ray Lamont; a petty criminal represented by Tara whom she later employs
- Maria Doyle Kennedy as George Cusack; Tara's new office partner (Series 2)
- Moe Dunford as Sam Dunbar; Eric's younger brother (Series 2)
- Paul Antony-Barber as Richard Dunbar; senior partner in the law firm and Eric's father
- Nick Dunning as Conrad Rafferty; Tara's father, who works as a barrister
- Ingrid Craigie as Irene Rafferty; Tara's mother and former legal secretary
- Brahm Gallagher as Pete; a local cafe owner who allows Tara to set up her fledgling firm in his back office (Series 1 — Series 2, Episode 1)

=== Recurring cast ===
- Conall Keating as Steve; Ray's partner
- Kate Gilmore as Lucy Whelan; receptionist at Dunbar's
- Sam McGovern as "Bookworm" Joe; a junior counsel
- Natalie Radmall-Quirke as Caroline Walsh; an employee at Dunbar's
- Elva Trill as Gillian; an employee at Dunbar's
- Susannah De Wrixon as Joan Dunbar; Eric's mother
- Enda Oates as Phillip McGrath (Series 2)
- Michael James Ford as Nigel Fitzjames (Series 2)
- Jane Brennan as Deidre York (Series 2)

== Episodes ==
=== Series 1 (2017) ===
No. overall	No. in series	Title	Directed by	Written by	Original release date	Viewers (millions)
1	1	"Episode 1"	Lisa James Larsson	Rob Heyland & James Phelan	1 January 2017	0.11
Dublin-based solicitor Tara Rafferty (Amy Huberman) discovers, on her hen night, that her fiancé and fellow solicitor, Eric Dunbar (Rory Keenan), has been cheating on her with a colleague, Caroline Walsh. After dumping him, Tara quits her job at the law firm they work at together and sets about making her own way in a new life outside the inner circle of the legal profession. At first unsure how she'll cope, Tara begins to realise she is more than capable of being on her own - both personally and professionally. Her first case as an independent barrister involves local celebrity Connor Coughlan (Adrian Hudson), who finds himself in the centre of a sex scandal after a film of him performing a sex act on a prostitute is leaked to the local media. Tara also tries to help local tearaway Ray, who finds himself charged with defrauding the state after falsely claiming £28,000 in benefits.
2	2	"Episode 2"	Lisa James Larsson	Mike O'Leary	8 January 2017	0.11
Tara represents Eve Hayes (Olga Wehrly), the daughter of a close family friend, after she is served an eviction notice by her sister, Ada (Joanne King), who has been made the sole beneficiary of their father's will. Ada argues that she has grounds to evict Eve and her partner Sean (Jamie O'Neill) after learning that they intend to convert their father's historically wealthy stately home into a yoga retreat. Tara reluctantly crosses the boundaries of client confidentiality in an attempt to broker a deal between the pair but is shocked when her case collapses in court after damning evidence against Eve is captured by a private investigator hired by Ada. Meanwhile, Vincent (Neil Morrissey) represents Ray (Emmet Byrne) at his trial hearing. Despite his initial reluctance, Ray agrees to plead guilty, a tactic which pays off and sees him served with a fine and community service.
3	3	"Episode 3"	Lisa James Larsson	Rob Heyland	15 January 2017	0.10
Tara represents Julie O'Brien (Ciara O'Callaghan), a married housewife whose husband, Barry, has been taken into hospital with multiple organ failure. Julie's status as next of kin is questioned when another woman, Corrine (Lorraine Pilkington) arrives at Barry's bedside also claiming to be his wife. As the pair squabble over who has the right to honour Barry's dying wishes, Tara learns that Corrine is to be represented by Eric. With both women confirmed to have married Barry, Corrine is proven to be the legal next of kin when her marriage certificate is discovered to precede Julie's by nine years. When hospital doctors acknowledge that Barry needs a liver transplant to survive, his son, Finbar, offers to become the donor. When Corrine objects, Tara realises that her only hope of helping Julie is to discredit Corrine, allowing Finbar the right to become the donor.
4	4	"Episode 4"	Lisa James Larsson	Rob Heyland & James Phelan	22 January 2017	0.08
Ray asks Tara to represent his friend, John Murphy (Terry O'Neill), whose son Sammy has been taken away by Social Services after a Garda Síochána raid on his flat, where a quantity of drugs was discovered. Tara believes the case to be hopeless, after evidence against both John and his partner Lydia (Gemma-Leah Devereux) is presented in court. Meanwhile, Ray convinces Pike to appoint Tara as his legal counsel on an inquiry into a group of local politicians and businessmen. Whilst cross-examining businessman Nigel Fitzjames (Michael James Ford), Pike discovers that a number of confidential records pertaining to a land deal have been removed from the public domain. Ray discovers the location of the records with a little help from Meg, but shortly after they are mysteriously destroyed in a fire. Meanwhile, Tara is shocked to discover Meg has betrayed her trust.

=== Series 2 (2018) ===
No. overall	No. in series	Title	Directed by	Written by	Original release date	Viewers (millions)
5	1	"Episode 1"	Lisa James Larsson	Rob Heyland	7 January 2018	N/A
Having been evicted from the café, Tara says her goodbyes to Pete, while Eric agrees to investigate to find out if his father was responsible for the eviction. With Ray still in custody, Tara asks George Cusack (Maria Doyle Kennedy) to represent him. Vincent's enquiry comes to a sudden halt when the destruction of evidence forces the investigation to collapse. In an attempt to generate income, Tara sends her mum to a law auction to bid on cases previously handled by a now-defunct firm. One of the cases involves Promise Obode (Stephanie Levi-John), an economic migrant facing deportation back to her home country. Her partner, Daniel Sullivan (Owen McDonnell), pleads for Tara's help in convincing her to marry. Meanwhile, despite being betrayed, Tara asks for Meg's help to uncover evidence concerning the suspicious circumstances surrounding Ray's arrest.
6	2	"Episode 2"	Lisa James Larsson	Rob Heyland	14 January 2018	N/A
As Vincent's enquiry threatens to grind to a halt, Ray tries to convince Philip York's widow Deidre (Jane Brennan) to give evidence. Meanwhile, Tara takes on a case involving a custody battle. Businessman David King (Adam Fergus) has applied for sole custody of his seven-year-old daughter, Mia, after her mother Suzi (Emily Taaffe) takes her to live in a self-sufficient commune, where she employs a polyamorous attitude to relationships. With little evidence to discredit Suzi aside from Mia's lack of attendance at school, Tara is forced to dig deeper to find the leverage she needs to win the case. Ray continues to investigate Meg and finds a number on her phone belonging to a burner used by Richard Dunbar, forcing Tara to finally confront her about her involvement in the shed fire. Eric's brother Sam (Moe Dunford) returns to Ireland and reignites his friendship with Tara.
7	3	"Episode 3"	Simon Massey	Anna McPartlin	21 January 2018	N/A
Tara takes on an unusual case involving former nun Monica Bridges (Charlotte Bradley), who has brought a case against her former convent after leaving during a high profile scandal involving the sexual abuse of minors by members of the order. Having lost the family home her late father loaned to the convent, along with the way of life that became routine for more than thirty years, Monica petitions the church to pay her a compensatory fee to help rebuild her life, and to fulfil their promise to provide a charitable donation to help a local homeless shelter providing support to victims of the scandal. The situation is further complicated when Eric appoints Caroline (Natalie Radmall-Quirke) as Tara's opposing counsel. Vincent appoints Bookworm (Sam McGovern) as his new assistant on the enquiry and makes a significant breakthrough. Sam reveals his feelings for Tara.
8	4	"Episode 4"	Simon Massey	Mick Collins	28 January 2018	N/A
George is approached by Dermot (Paul Ronan) and Tony Doyle (Evan McCabe), a father-and-son involved in a 'crash for cash' scam. Unknowingly, Tara agrees to take on the case of one of their conspirators, Stephen Morris (Aaron Monaghan), whose insurance company has refused to payout. When Tara subconsciously catches sight of George's file on the Doyles, she is forced to come clean to prevent George from making a fool of herself in court. In an attempt to distance herself from the case, Tara visits Stephen and tries to persuade him to drop his claim, but when Meg uncovers CCTV evidence that suggests he was in fact an innocent victim, having been hit by Tony Doyle by mistake, Tara tries to rectify the situation by arranging for an out-of-court settlement. Vincent's enquiry is suspended when Dunbar's make an official complaint regarding Tara's involvement.
9	5	"Episode 5"	Simon Massey	Mick Collins	4 February 2018	N/A
Tara is approached by former client Barry O'Brien (Simon O'Gorman), whose first wife Corrine (Lorraine Pilkington) has petitioned for divorce. Barry is concerned that Corrine will try to take half of his new business, a gym and leisure centre co-owned by him and his second wife, Julie (Ciara O'Callaghan). Meanwhile, Corrine approaches Eric and demands that he petition for half of everything owned by Barry, totalling a sum of more than £2.5 million. Barry refuses to allow Corrine to take away part of his livelihood, so Tara tries a different approach by getting Barry's son Finbar to try to act as a peacekeeper. Meanwhile, Richard asks Eric to withdraw the complaint against Tara in order to allow Vincent's enquiry to continue. Fitzjames admits culpability, despite Eric's advice. George uncovers some interesting information about the Garda officers who arrested Ray.
10	6	"Episode 6"	Simon Massey	Rob Heyland	11 February 2018	N/A
As the fallout from Fitzjames' revelation continues, Eric arrives at work to find that Lucy has been replaced, having seemingly been offered a job in New York - with an immediate start. Suspecting that his father may have engineered the move, Eric threatens to walk out on Dunbar's and testify against his father at the enquiry. Tara approaches Deidre York to obtain the leverage required to haul Richard in for questioning. Meg tails a Superintendent connected with the two guards involved in Ray's arrest and witnesses him at a covert meeting with none other than Richard - and to her surprise - Tara's father, Conrad. As Richard faces a grilling from Vincent, Tara is shocked to discover that Sam will be representing his father. But just as Richard's involvement threatens to unravel, a breaking news story involving Vincent and Tara manages to bring the enquiry to a standstill.

== Production ==
On June 20, 2016, a 4-part English language drama series called Cheaters was ordered on RTÉ One, starring Amy Huberman, and based on The Good Wife by Robert and Michelle King. The premise would follow Tara, a solicitor who returns to work in law and start her own firm after learning that her husband has cheated. The show, later titled Striking Out, ran for ten episodes over two seasons.
