= The Good Wife =

2009 American television series

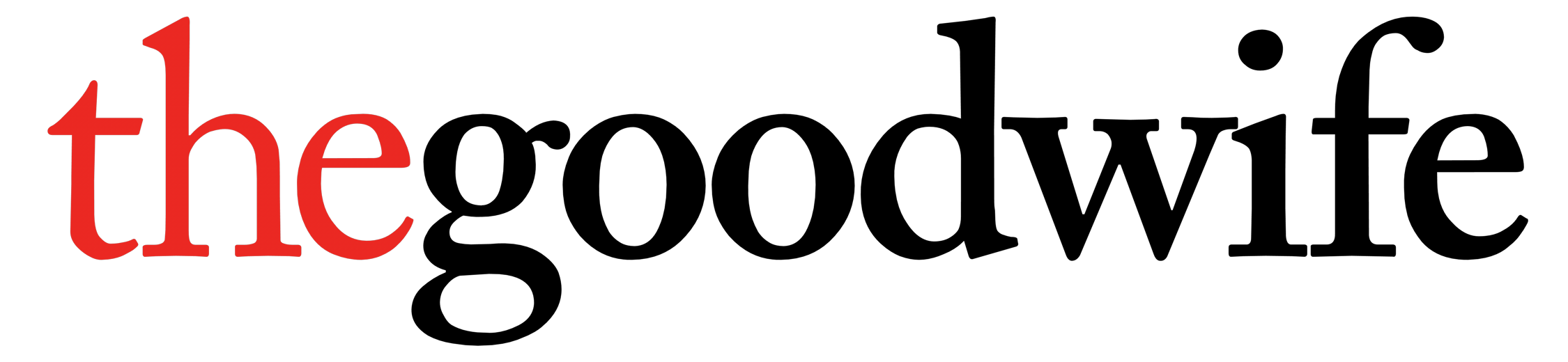
- Genre: Legal drama; Political drama
- Created by: Robert King; Michelle King
- Showrunners: Robert King; Michelle King
- Starring: Julianna Margulies; Matt Czuchry; Archie Panjabi; Graham Phillips; Makenzie Vega; Josh Charles; Christine Baranski; Alan Cumming; Zach Grenier; Matthew Goode; Cush Jumbo; Jeffrey Dean Morgan
- Composers: Danny Lux (2009); David Buckley (2010–2015)
- Country of origin: United States
- Original language: English
- No. of seasons: 7
- No. of episodes: 156 (list of episodes)

Production
- Executive producers: Ridley Scott; Dee Johnson; David W. Zucker; Michelle King; Robert King; Brooke Kennedy; Ted Humphrey; Tony Scott
- Producers: Ron Binkowski; Corinne Brinkerhoff
- Production locations: Vancouver, Canada ("Pilot"); New York City, U.S. (all other episodes)
- Camera setup: Single-camera
- Running time: 40–46 minutes
- Production companies: Scott Free Productions (2009–2016); King Size Productions (2009–2016); Small Wishes Productions (2009–2010); CBS Productions (2009–2012); CBS Television Studios (2012–2016)

Original release
- Network: CBS
- Release: September 22, 2009 – May 8, 2016

Related
- The Good Fight; Elsbeth; The Good Wife (South Korea); The Good Wife (Japan); The Trial (India); Good Wife (India)

The Good Wife is an American legal political drama television series that aired on CBS from September 22, 2009, to May 8, 2016. It focuses on Alicia Florrick, the wife of the Cook County State's Attorney, who returns to her career in law after the events of a public sex and political corruption scandal involving her husband.

The Good Wife is a serialized show with standalone storylines that are concluded by the end of each episode. It also features several story arcs that play out over multiple episodes or seasons. These serial plots—a rarity on CBS—were especially showcased in its highly praised fifth season.

The series was created by Robert and Michelle King and stars Julianna Margulies, Josh Charles, Christine Baranski, Matt Czuchry, Archie Panjabi, Zach Grenier, Matthew Goode, Cush Jumbo, Jeffrey Dean Morgan and Alan Cumming, and features Chris Noth in a recurring role. The executive producers included the Kings, Ridley and Tony Scott, Charles McDougall, and David W. Zucker.

The Good Wife was acclaimed during its run and considered by several critics to be network television's "last great drama". It won numerous awards, including five Emmys and the 2014 Television Critics Association Award for Outstanding Achievement in Drama. The performances of the show's cast have been particularly recognized, with Julianna Margulies, Archie Panjabi, Christine Baranski, and Josh Charles each receiving widespread acclaim. The show was also lauded for its insight on social media and the internet in society, politics, and law. It received recognition for producing full 22-episode seasons while other similarly acclaimed dramas often produce only 6 to 13 episodes per season.

CBS announced during the Super Bowl on February 7, 2016, that the show was ending with its seventh season. The final episode aired on May 8, 2016. A spinoff titled The Good Fight, centered around Baranski's character Diane Lockhart and Cush Jumbo's Lucca Quinn, also starring Rose Leslie and Delroy Lindo, premiered in February 2017.

== Premise ==
Set in Chicago, the series focuses on Alicia Florrick (Margulies), whose husband Peter (Noth), the former Cook County, Illinois State's Attorney, has been jailed following a notorious political corruption and sex scandal. After having spent the previous 13 years as a stay-at-home mother, Alicia returns to the workforce as a litigator to provide for her two children.

== Production ==
=== Conception ===
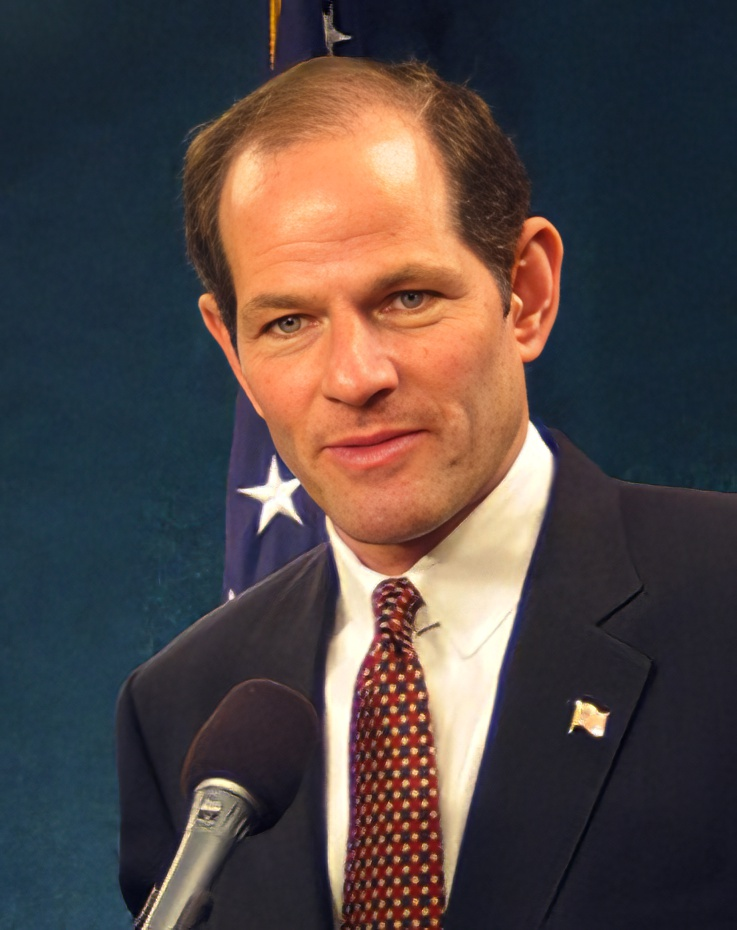
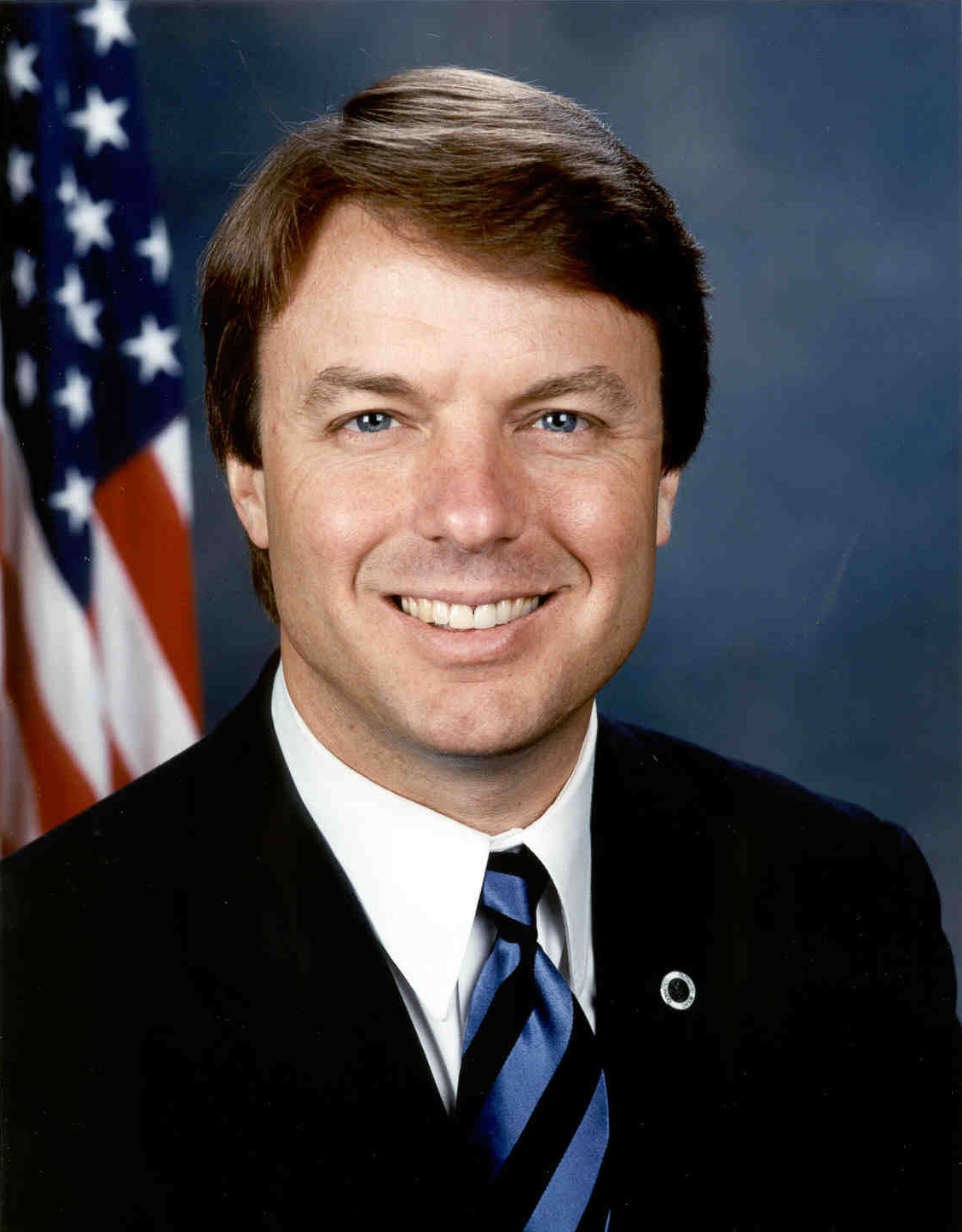
The Eliot Spitzer (left) and John Edwards scandals served as inspiration for The Good Wife.

Writers Michelle and Robert King wanted to create a series that focused on the wife of a high-profile politician following a public sex scandal. They got the idea after they observed prominent American scandals of this nature, such as those involving President Bill Clinton and North Carolina Senator John Edwards. The image of a wife standing silently beside her husband as he publicly admits to his sexual or political misconduct had become clichéd, according to Robert King. This image led the Kings to question why these women stood by their husbands, as well as to wonder about the events that followed that initial announcement. They were further intrigued by the fact that many of the wives were lawyers who had halted their personal careers for the sake of their husbands' professional ambitions. The actual idea for the series was first postulated in the weeks following the Eliot Spitzer prostitution scandal of 2008. As Michelle King explains:

You know, what's interesting about a lot of these political scandals is that the women are lawyers, too. Hillary is a lawyer. Elizabeth Edwards is a lawyer. I think that got us thinking along those lines. That is, we knew she had to go back to work, and we had so many female lawyers to draw on.

=== Production ===
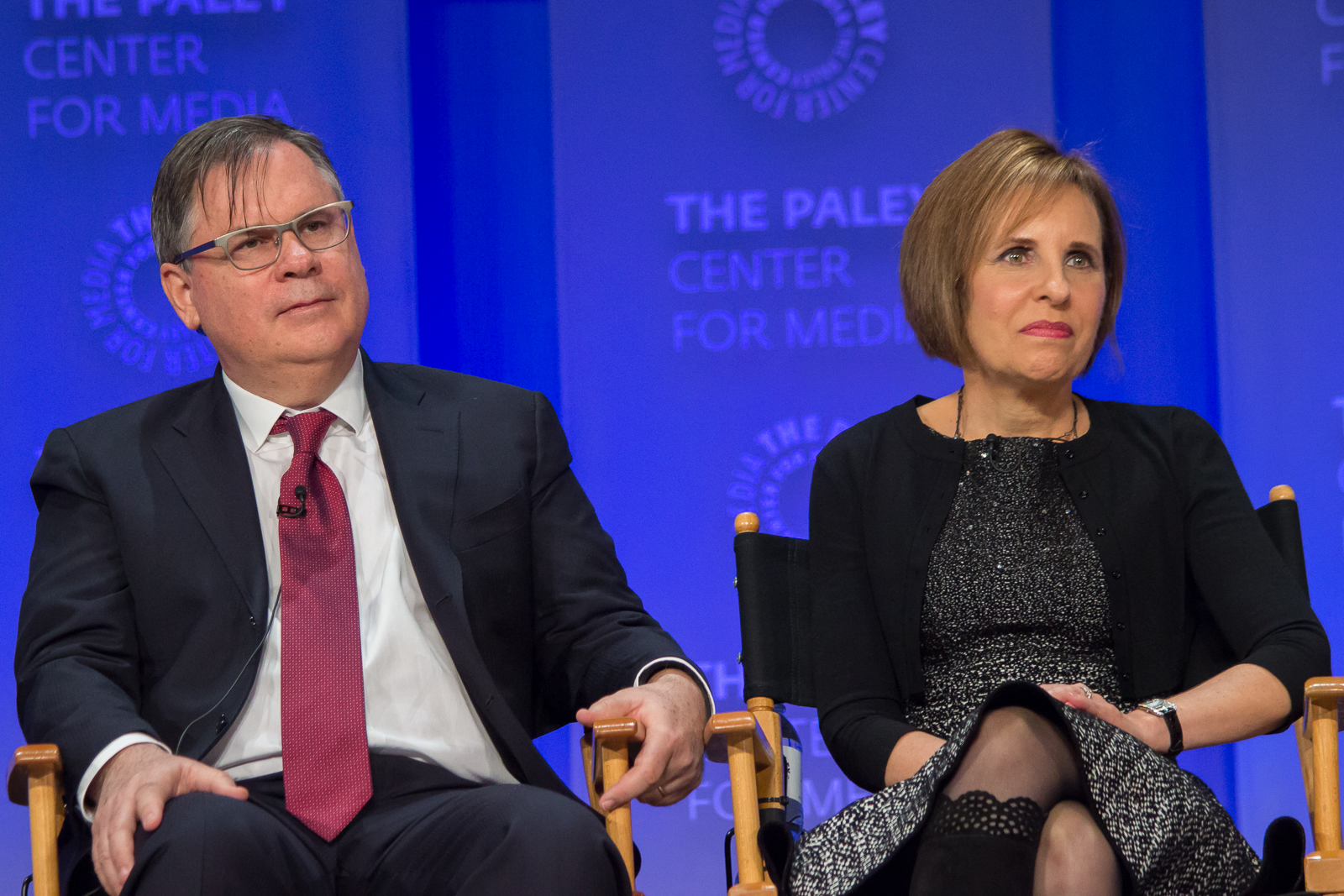
Robert and Michelle King at the 2015 PaleyFest presentation for The Good Wife

The series was created by Michelle and Robert King, who serve as executive producers and show runners. The pair had produced the short-lived legal drama In Justice that aired as a mid-season replacement in early 2006. The creators had previously worked extensively in feature films. Scott Free productions helped to finance The Good Wife and Ridley Scott, Tony Scott (until his death) and David W. Zucker are credited as executive producers.

Executive producer Dee Johnson added television writing experience to the team. Charles McDougall directed the pilot episode and was the pilot's other executive producer. McDougall had previously enjoyed success as the director of the pilot for Desperate Housewives. All seven executive producers returned when a full series was ordered and they were joined by executive producer Brooke Kennedy. McDougall left the crew after directing and executive producing the second episode. The series is produced by Bernadette Caulfield who had previously worked on the HBO polygamy drama Big Love; co-producer Ron Binkowski added post production experience to the pilot and returned for the first season.

Several new producers were added to the crew once CBS ordered a full season. Angela Amato Velez joined the crew as a consulting producer and writer bringing legal experience from her careers as a police officer and legal aid attorney and writing experience from the police dramas Third Watch and Southland. Todd Ellis Kessler, who had recently completed production on The Unit, and had previously worked on legal drama The Practice, joined the staff as a co-executive producer and writer. Ted Humphrey served as a supervising producer and writer and then as co-executive producer and writer. Corinne Brinkerhoff completed the production team as a writer and co-producer. Brinkerhoff had previously worked as a writer and story editor on Boston Legal. David W. Zucker is an executive producer on the show, having been nominated for four Primetime Emmys and one PGA Award. His credits included Judging Amy, The Pillars of the Earth, and Law Dogs.

Julianna Margulies was also credited as a producer beginning with the third season in 2011.

Although the series is set in Chicago and the pilot was filmed in Vancouver, it was filmed in New York, with an interior set in Greenpoint, Brooklyn. The Kings and the writing staff were based in Los Angeles and used teleconferencing to plan with the director of each episode.

Kristin Chenoweth, who was intended to have recurring role as a reporter on the show in the fourth season, was seriously injured in an on-set accident in 2012.

New York City Mayor Michael Bloomberg made an appearance as himself in 2013. His successor, Mayor Bill de Blasio, who said he was "deeply obsessed" with the show, made an appearance as himself in 2014. Gloria Steinem, Valerie Jarrett, Donna Brazile also made appearances, as did Frank Seddio, then-chair of the Brooklyn Democratic Party.

Authenticity of plot and characters was achieved through the use of script consultants, including Karen Kessler, who is a founding member and president of Evergreen Partners, a public relations and events planning firm.

It was reported in October 2014 that Archie Panjabi would be leaving the show after the sixth season.

In May 2015, TVLine reported that Julianna Margulies and Archie Panjabi had not actually been on set together to film a final scene between Alicia and Kalinda in the season 6 finale, with shots of the two characters spliced together in post-production, after ongoing reporting had noticed that the characters had not shared a scene since the middle of the fourth season in February 2013, raising questions about their off-screen relationship and the filming of the scene. In a subsequent interview in August 2015, the producers said they would not go into the mechanics of filming in order to address "gossip" about an alleged rift between the two actresses. In October 2015, Margulies stated at The New Yorker Festival that "it was shot the way Robert wanted to shoot it, and the story line, too" and also referred to the timing of Panjabi's work on the series The Fall; however, in response to an article about Margulies' comments, Panjabi posted on Twitter that "The Fall was not even in production at that time and I was in New York ready to film the scene." TVLine also looked back at the controversy ten years later.

In the final season, which began airing in the fourth quarter of 2015, Chris Noth's character Peter Florrick was written to be a fictional candidate running in the 2016 Democratic Party presidential primaries.

== Cast and characters ==
=== Main characters ===
- Julianna Margulies as Alicia Florrick. The wife of Peter, a disgraced State's Attorney, Alicia returns to work as a junior litigator at the law firm Stern, Lockhart & Gardner thanks to the support of her old law school friend Will Gardner, for whom she has feelings. Having spent so many years as "the good wife", she finds herself at the bottom of the career ladder, trying to juggle both home and professional life with the scandal surrounding her husband, with whom she has two children, Zach and Grace. Alicia is smart, independent, fiercely protective of her children, and much more than just a good wife. She excels at keeping a cool exterior. She is rarely ruffled and almost always thinks through what she is going to say, choosing her words for maximum impact or sting. Alicia graduated top of her class from Georgetown University Law Center in the mid-1990s. After graduation she worked at Crozier, Abrams & Abbott for about two years but left to focus on her kids and Peter's career. Her struggles to go back to work and how she is penalized for the "mommy gap", are seen as emblematic of the work–life struggles of real working women. She and her gay younger brother, Owen, have a loving relationship despite having personalities that are opposites. In Season 3, Alicia is a third-year associate at the firm. She and Peter are separated and she has an affair with Will but by mid-season, she breaks it off. Alicia struggles with her feelings for Peter. She is deeply hurt and has not entirely forgiven him but she still loves him. Toward the end of Season 3, Peter announces his candidacy for governor of Illinois; Alicia stands at his side as he makes the announcement. In Season 4, Alicia gets and takes a promotion as an equity partner of the firm and begins planning to start a new firm with Cary. After Will dies in Season 5, Alicia goes into a period of mourning and separates from Peter, maintaining their marriage for the sake of their careers. In Season 6, Alicia runs for State's Attorney and develops a friendship with prosecutor Finn Polmar. Soon after winning the election, Alicia is caught up in an electoral fraud scandal, and though innocent, must resign her post. Broken and humiliated once again, she returns to law, working initially as a bond court lawyer before starting a small private practice in her apartment.
- Matt Czuchry as Cary Agos, a young Harvard-educated lawyer. In the first season, he is a first year associate at Lockhart Gardner with Alicia Florrick. In the first episode, it is established that there is only one permanent position, putting Cary into competition with Alicia. At the end of the first season, the firm selects Alicia, and Cary goes to work for the state attorney's office. In season three, Cary is appointed Cook County Deputy State's Attorney, though he subsequently is demoted for having an in-office affair. Dissatisfied with the demotion, he accepts an offer to return to Lockhart Gardner. He is often placed in rivalry with Alicia and sometimes resents her for this and her political connections thanks to her husband, Peter Florrick, the disgraced State's Attorney. His own career trajectory takes many twists and turns, often because of bad luck, but Cary maintains his integrity and loyalty to individual relationships he has formed. He seems to have a crush on Kalinda Sharma, the firm's investigator. It is later revealed that Cary has a very difficult and distant relationship with his father, Jeffrey Agos, a lobbyist in Washington, D.C., who does not ever seem to think Cary is good enough. As season four ends, after not getting the partnership at Lockhart Gardner that he sought, he forms a new firm bringing with him the other fourth year lawyers at the firm, and manages to convince newly minted Lockhart Gardner partner Alicia to come with them.
- Archie Panjabi as Kalinda Sharma (seasons 1–6), the firm's in-house investigator. Kalinda previously worked for Peter for three years. He fired her after accusing her of working two jobs. Kalinda is unflappable, inscrutable, fiercely private, and occasionally physically violent. She is exceptionally good at her job, although her tactics are not always strictly legal. She is often the key to the firm's winning a case, usually at the eleventh hour. She generally does not work well with others. Although Kalinda does not let many people close to her, she becomes good friends with Alicia and she feels protective of her. After becoming friends, Alicia finds out Kalinda had a one-night stand with Peter before she knew Alicia, damaging their friendship; over time, the two start to reconcile. Kalinda has a cynical, misanthropic outlook on human behavior. She is openly bisexual and has a series of relationships through the show, mostly with women and often because they can help her with a case. Kalinda once claimed that she prefers women because to her, women are better lovers than men for women understand her needs and feelings better. Very little is known about Kalinda when the series begins, and she is incredibly secretive about her past. The character's signature wardrobe piece has become a pair of knee-high boots; the character initially wore pumps but Panjabi felt that boots "grounded her in the character". In Season 4, it is revealed that Kalinda has an estranged abusive husband, Nick Saverese, played by Marc Warren. Kalinda also grows romantically close with Cary. In Season 6, she desperately tries to save Cary from a malicious prosecution on drug-related charges while Alicia is busy running for office, and at a point of desperation, fakes a Brady violation through computer hacking to have Cary's charges dropped. Later, when her deception is caught, she is forced to surrender drug dealer Lemond Bishop to the State's Attorney's office in order to spare Diane from prosecution, as Diane had unknowingly used the fake evidence in court. In order not to be found by Bishop for turning him over to the state's attorney office, Kalinda disappears for her own safety.
- Graham Phillips as Zachary "Zach" Florrick (seasons 1–5; recurring seasons 6–7), the teenage son of Alicia and Peter Florrick. He is the elder of the Florricks' two children, the older brother of Grace Florrick, grandson of Jackie Florrick and Veronica Loy (Alicia's mother), and nephew of Owen Cavanaugh. Zach has an interest in politics, at one point joining Peter's campaign as an intern. Zach is smart, stubborn and also has a strong sense of right and wrong, which has led him to not be afraid of questioning authority figures at times. Zach's computer skills and technical know-how also expose lies that are being spread about his dad. Beyond his computer skills, he shows an aptitude for using the law like his mother. He is protective of his mom because of what his father has put her through. Zach is coping with his parents' separation and starting at a new school and also starting to date. Throughout the series, Zach dates the scheming Becca and later a girl named Neesa who is of Somali origin and whose race and religion are occasionally brought into his father's campaign, which causes some issues. This becomes complicated when his father is released from prison and contemplates a run for office, making his children's life political fodder, despite their mother's best efforts. Zach eventually goes to Georgetown University.
- Makenzie Vega as Grace Florrick, the teenage daughter of Alicia and Peter Florrick. She is the younger of the Florricks' two children, the younger sister of Zach Florrick, granddaughter of Jackie Florrick and also Veronica Loy (Alicia's mother), and niece of Owen Cavanaugh. Although pretty and compassionate, she is friendless, which is most likely due to her personality. She begins to become deeply religious, thanks to a friend at school, much to her mother's bemusement, and Alicia tries to be supportive in spite of her own atheist outlook. Grace is naïve and young for her age. She has a tutor, Jennifer, who likes to bust out dancing in public. She has many questions about her father's infidelity, which she does not understand. She previously idolized her father, and despite his sins, she wants her parents to get back together. Grace was not happy about the move from their house in Highland Park to their apartment, and initially struggles to make friends in school. In the final season, she provides clerical support for her mom when Alicia starts a new legal business out of their apartment.
- Josh Charles as Will Gardner (seasons 1–5; guest seasons 6–7), a name partner at Stern, Lockhart & Gardner. An old friend of Alicia's, in the pilot he helped her get a job with the firm and is constantly trying to avoid appearing as if he favors her. This is complicated by the fact that the two have feelings for each other. Will and Alicia have an affair beginning at the end of season two. In season three they break up when Alicia's daughter goes missing, and Alicia decides she needs to focus more on her children. He is seen as very much of a ladies' man throughout the series and had various love affairs and girlfriends. Will generally had a good working relationship with Diane Lockhart, his co-managing partner at the firm, and the two demonstrate a shrewd ability to guide their business, even through difficult times. Will plays in a regular pick-up basketball game with other attorneys and judges, and has friendships with the players that are eventually scrutinized. During season three, Will is suspended from practicing law for six months as punishment stemming from an old bribery scandal but returns to the firm in season four. In season five after much planning, Alicia and Cary leave Lockhart & Gardner to start their own firm; Will takes this betrayal personally. In episode 15 of the fifth season, he is shot and killed in the courtroom by his client Jeffrey Grant (played by Hunter Parrish).
- Christine Baranski as Diane Lockhart, a name partner at the firm: She is liberal and is a champion of women's causes. A photo on her desk in her office shows her with Hillary Clinton. She has strong opinions on many issues, including on guns and violence. She speaks fluent French and seems to have an active social life. Among her paramours is Kurt McVeigh, a firearms expert and conservative Republican, whom Diane is drawn to despite their political opposites and her dislike of guns, and they eventually marry. Although she is initially skeptical of Alicia Florrick's abilities as a lawyer when she joins the firm, Diane becomes a sort of mentor to her. But she is a mentor at a distance, and her support often comes by way of cryptic advice that only points Alicia in the right direction. She does not hesitate to tell anyone when she thinks they are wrong. Diane is often torn between supporting Alicia and Cary Agos when the two are in competition.
- Alan Cumming as Eli Gold (seasons 2–7; recurring season 1), Peter Florrick's campaign strategist and crisis manager. Eli consults for Peter when he considers a return to office. His style of management is to be blunt, often rude. Eli is politically astute and does not waste time with niceties. Eli is separated from his wife, Vanessa Gold, who has political aspirations of her own, and has a daughter, Marissa, who is similarly outspoken like her mother and shares a healthy relationship with her father. Eli believes that securing the support of Peter's wife Alicia is crucial to any ambitions he may harbor, and he quickly realizes that Alicia is no pushover and his usual wife-coddling techniques will not work. He mostly seems to respect the boundaries Alicia sets up, particularly where they concern her children Zach and Grace. As a top political consultant who is also an expert in damage control, Eli has talks with Diane Lockhart and Will Gardner about joining their firm in some way. Eli seems genuinely invested in Peter Florrick and respects both him and Alicia, although she is often a frustrating enigma to him. He has a brief shot at romance with Natalie Flores, a student who worked in the past as a nanny for Wendy Scott-Carr. Eli leaks details to the press of Natalie's status as an illegal immigrant but as he comes to know her he is seen to regret this and later helps her get a job as an intern at Lockhart & Gardner. Cumming's portrayal of Gold has been compared to Rahm Emanuel. He became a main character in season two. Eli is Jewish, but not very religious. He does, however, request the Sabbath off. In season 5 Peter asks him to be his chief of staff, which position Eli accepts.
- Zach Grenier as David Lee (seasons 5–7; recurring seasons 1–4), head of Family Law, a divorce lawyer, and an equity partner at Lockhart Gardner. The Family Law division is responsible for a sizeable chunk of the firm's income, so David has more sway than Diane or Will would like. David is misanthropic and is prone to scowling, sarcasm and being directly rude to people when he thinks things are not going his way. More than anything, he is unambiguously concerned with making money. He particularly hates Julius Cain, the firm's head of litigation and an equity partner. Nevertheless, at rare moments, Alicia Florrick turns to him for help and he comes through. Although no easy judge of character, he has a liking for Alicia's mother, and sporadically asks Alicia about her. After recurring in the first four seasons, he was promoted to a series regular for the fifth season.
- Matthew Goode as Finley "Finn" Polmar (seasons 5–6). Introduced in the fifteenth episode of the fifth season, Finn Polmar is the Assistant State's Attorney who prosecuted Jeffrey Grant (played by Hunter Parrish) who was being defended by Will Gardner. During a shooting in the courtroom, Finn is wounded pulling a dying Will to safety. As Finn recovers from his injuries, Alicia later seeks him out looking for answers after Will's death, and even acts as Finn's lawyer when the State's Attorney's Office tries to scapegoat him. In the sixth season, he is the Assistant State's Attorney up against Florrick-Agos, trying to take down one of their top clients, drug kingpin Lemond Bishop (played by Mike Colter). Finn leaves the State's Attorney office midway through the sixth season to start his own practice, and he represents Alicia in exit negotiations with Cary and Diane, though he declines Alicia's invitation to work with her. Finn's sister died of a drug overdose, he is divorced, and has a son. At one point Finn confides in Alicia that he and his wife had a miscarriage. Finn's character was intended to help fill the gap Will's death left behind, but he left the show after season six.
- Cush Jumbo as Lucca Quinn (season 7). A bond court attorney who Alicia encounters at the start of the seventh season. They soon become business partners and develop a close friendship.
- Jeffrey Dean Morgan as Jason Crouse (season 7). A calm, experienced hourly investigator whom Alicia hires in the seventh season, where he becomes a love interest to Alicia.

=== Recurring characters ===
- Peter Florrick (Chris Noth) is Alicia's husband. The series begins with Peter resigning as State's Attorney of Cook County and going to prison amid a corruption and prostitution scandal. He spends most of the first season appealing his conviction and is cleared of the charges by the end of the season. He then successfully campaigns for election as State's Attorney again, and later successfully runs for governor of Illinois.
- Jackie Florrick (Mary Beth Peil) is Peter's meddling mother. She is reluctant to believe in her son's corrupt behavior and is hopeful Alicia and Peter will reunite. Her meddling irritates Alicia who has little affection for her mother-in-law.
- Geneva Pine (Renée Elise Goldsberry) is an Assistant State's Attorney.
- Julius Cain (Michael Boatman) is a lawyer and equity partner at Lockhart Gardner who serves as Head of Litigation.
- Lemond Bishop (Mike Colter) is a wealthy drug dealer whose business Derrick Bond brings to Lockhart Gardner. Diane Lockhart and Will Gardner have misgivings about representing someone of his ilk, but badly need his business and his money. They focus on representing his legitimate business interests, but he ends up needing more of their services. He cares deeply for his young son.
- Matan Brody (Chris Butler) is a prosecutor for the Cook County Illinois State's Attorney's office under Glenn Childs. He is frequently opposing counsel to the lawyers at Stern, Lockhart & Gardner. He does not like Cary Agos and accuses him of having a "thing for ethnic women".
- Glenn Childs (Titus Welliver) is Peter's arch-rival who succeeded Peter as State's Attorney after the latter's resignation. He spends the first season trying to keep Peter in prison, and later runs against Peter for State's Attorney. He is forced to drop out of the race amid controversy, and later works as an Assistant US Attorney.
- Becca (Dreama Walker) is Zach Florrick's high school girlfriend early in the first season. She enjoys the notoriety that comes with Zach's family name and turns out to be quite the schemer for a high school student. Eli Gold involves himself in keeping her in line.
- Kurt McVeigh (Gary Cole) is a ballistics expert who helps the firm on several cases, and an on-and-off love interest for Diane. Diane and he get married in season five, in spite of their political differences.
- Patti Nyholm (Martha Plimpton) is a rival attorney who opposes the Lockhart, Gardner crew in several cases. She is a scheming lawyer who mainly represents big companies. She has two kids whom she often uses to win time or the affections of judges, jurors, and witnesses. Plimpton's performance earned her a Primetime Emmy Award for Outstanding Guest Actress in a Drama Series in 2012.
- Lana Delaney (Jill Flint) is a lesbian FBI special agent who is Kalinda's on-again off-again love interest.
- Jonas Stern (Kevin Conway) is the third name partner in Stern, Lockhart & Gardner when the series begins. He is one of the firm's founders and a legendary lawyer. He is frequently out of the office and out of sight out of mind. He comes to Alicia Florrick for assistance representing him in a DUI case and puts her in a difficult position.
- Elsbeth Tascioni (Carrie Preston) is a quirky lawyer introduced in the episode "Mock" as part of Peter's legal defense team. She returns in the third season to help Alicia when she gets in trouble with the Treasury Department. Later in that series, Will hires her to help him when Wendy Scott-Carr investigates him for judicial bribery. Preston won the Primetime Emmy Award for Outstanding Guest Actress in a Drama Series for her work on the show in 2013. She received an additional nomination in the same category for the show in 2016.
- Colin Sweeney (Dylan Baker) is a major client of Stern, Lockhart & Gardner who has a habit of being accused of murder of women he is involved with. Although Alicia finds Colin's alleged crimes repugnant, he has a certain charm and wit. He is also quite taken by her.
- Daniel Golden (Joe Morton) is a member of Peter's legal team who later works in the State Department.
- Nancy Crozier (Mamie Gummer) is a young rival attorney who has been opposing counsel to Alicia in various cases. She pretends to be a bumbling, innocent country girl when she is, in fact, a skilled and devious attorney.
- Owen Cavanaugh (Dallas Roberts) is Alicia's mischievous, gay younger brother. He is a professor of mathematics and moves from Oregon to Chicago in season two.
- Louis Canning (Michael J. Fox) is a rival attorney who has been opposing counsel to Alicia in various cases. Canning is afflicted with tardive dyskinesia, which he often uses to curry sympathy with judges, juries and witnesses. He offers Alicia a job in "Wrongful Termination", which she rejects. After Will's death, he becomes a named partner at Lockhart, Gardner and plots with David Lee to remove Diane. Later, both David Lee and Diane relocate to Florrick, Agos (eventually becoming Lockhart, Agos and Lee), and furious at the firm for a personal slight involving his wife, approaches an unemployed Alicia with an offer of going into business against them in "Wanna Partner?"
- Frank Landau (Mike Pniewski) is the chairman of the Democratic National Committee and as such holds a great amount of say in any political aspirations Peter Florrick may have. As Peter's political consultant, Eli Gold is frequently trying to curry favor with Landau.
- Wendy Scott-Carr (Anika Noni Rose) is a lawyer for the Cook County State Attorney's office and Peter's political rival in season two. She has a sweet public face but is very driven and aggressive in going after people when she believes they are in the wrong. In season three, she is hired by Peter to investigate Will Gardner.
- Andrew Wiley (Tim Guinee) is a freelance investigator hired by the State's Attorneys office. He knows Cary Agos from their work in the past. He became a stay-at-home dad to his young daughter and often brings her along on his stakeouts or interviews, giving him a deceptively non-threatening air.
- Marissa Gold (Sarah Steele) is Eli's daughter and Alicia's body woman when she runs for office.
- Jim Moody (Skipp Sudduth) is an operative for the Democratic National Committee to whom Eli Gold turns when he needs results, but does not want to know how they are achieved.
- Natalie Flores (America Ferrera) is Wendy Scott-Carr's former nanny and Eli's brief love interest in season two.
- Blake Calamar (Scott Porter) is a private investigator for the firm who competes with Kalinda. He tries to frame Kalinda for putting a doctor in a coma but fails. He finds out that her former name was Leela Tahiri and Peter helped her change it. In return, she slept with Peter. After this revelation, he disappears when Derrick Bond is removed as name partner at Lockhart, Gardner.
- Derrick Bond (Michael Ealy) is a new partner in season two. He plays Will and Diane against each other, forcing Diane to plan a new firm. He fails when Will and Diane find out his scheme and turn on him. In "Great Firewall", he is removed as a named partner.
- Howard Lyman (Jerry Adler) is an equity partner at Lockhart Gardner who does not work anymore but collects his profits. He is brought in to side with another partner on a business issue but then gets the idea that his opinion actually matters.
- Neil Gross (John Benjamin Hickey) is the founder of Chumhum, the series' version of Google. He is arrogant, ambitious, very wealthy, and used to getting his way.
- Mike Kresteva (Matthew Perry) is an attorney who leads a blue ribbon panel that Alicia is appointed to in season three; and later becomes Peter's Republican rival in the general election for Illinois governor during season four.
- Vanessa Gold (Parker Posey) is a political consultant and Eli Gold's ex-wife. They remain on good terms with each other. She has political aspirations of her own.
- Caitlin d'Arcy (Anna Camp) is a junior associate at Lockhart, Gardner. She is the niece of David Lee and Alicia acts as her mentor. She leaves Lockhart & Gardner in season three to become a stay-at-home mother.
- Dana Lodge (Monica Raymund) is Assistant State's Attorney who is often on the opposing side of cases of lawyer from Stern, Lockhart & Gardner. She, along with Cary, is assigned to the investigation into Will Gardner led by Wendy Scott-Carr. She cultivates a flirty relationship with Kalinda Sharma in an attempt to get incriminating information on Will. Dana and Cary have a brief relationship, which is against office rules.
- Robyn Burdine (Jess Weixler) is the firm's second in-house private investigator, hired during season four. She originally worked for Lockhart Gardner but left to work for Florrick/Agos after Cary asked her to come with them.
- Mandy Post (Miriam Shor) is a reporter who thinks she has a scoop on Peter Florrick in season four and Eli Gold frantically tries to get ahead of her story.
- Veronica Loy (Stockard Channing) is Alicia's heavy drinking mother. Her several husbands and lovers are an annoyance to Alicia and Owen. It is implied that David Lee, who helped her challenge her late husband's pre-nup, likes her.
- Clarke Hayden (Nathan Lane) is a court-appointed trustee in charge of getting the firm out of bankruptcy in season four. In season five, he joins Florrick/Agos as now a fully qualified lawyer and pro bono accountant for the firm until they become profitable.
- Nick Saverese (Marc Warren) is Kalinda's abusive ex-husband, whom she had been avoiding by changing her name. He appears in season four, after being revealed as connected in some way to the unseen person knocking on Kalinda's door in the cliff-hanger at the end of season three. The character proved unpopular with fans and critics, bringing a sudden end to the storyline. After escalating patterns of abuse and incidents affecting the lives of Kalinda's friends, she resolves to deal with him once and for all; she later tells Alicia that he is gone.
- Captain Laura Hellinger (Amanda Peet) is a former Army captain and military lawyer. While in Afghanistan, a contractor attempted to rape her. Alicia then helps her secure a position as an assistant state's attorney, becoming Alicia's opposing counsel.
- Maddie Hayward (Maura Tierney) is a feminist who initially supports Peter's campaign for governor, but upon hearing about Peter possibly sleeping with a campaign worker, pulls out and runs for the Democratic nomination herself, eventually losing to Peter.
- Jordan Karahalios (T. R. Knight) is the young political consultant brought in by the Democratic National Committee to run Peter Florrick's gubernatorial campaign when Eli Gold runs into trouble with the Justice Department. Eli hates him immediately. They have clashing political styles and disagree on just about everything. Peter has a hard time listening to Jordan's advice. Jordan also struggles to understand the détente that Eli has worked out with Alicia, including the limits she places on involving her or her children in the campaign.
- Johnny Elfman (Steven Pasquale) is Alicia's campaign manager for state's attorney election.
- Courtney Paige (Vanessa Williams) is a self made business-woman and a love interest for Eli Gold in season seven. Wiliams based her interpretation of Paige on American businesswoman Mellody Hobson, whom she studied through Hobson's TED talks.
- Ruth Eastman (Margo Martindale) is a respected Democratic elections consultant who Peter hires as his campaign manager, in place of Eli, when he attempts to run for President. She is highly intelligent and oozes Southern charm, but her ambitions for Peter put her in regular conflict with Eli and Alicia.
- Burl Preston (F. Murray Abraham) is a powerful LA-based lawyer who challenges Lockhart Gardner in seasons two and three.
- Nathan Landry (Pedro Pascal) is an assistant state's attorney who appeared in seasons one and two.
- Celeste Serrano (Lisa Edelstein), an attorney and Will's former partner.

== Episodes ==
Season	Episodes	Originally released		Rank	Average viewership (in millions)
Season	Episodes	First released	Last released	Rank	Average viewership (in millions)
1	23	September 22, 2009	May 25, 2010	18	13.12
2	23	September 28, 2010	May 17, 2011	16	13.00
3	22	September 25, 2011	April 29, 2012	26	11.83
4	22	September 30, 2012	April 28, 2013	27	10.98
5	22	September 29, 2013	May 18, 2014	23	11.43
6	22	September 21, 2014	May 10, 2015	22	12.17
7	22	October 4, 2015	May 8, 2016	27	10.84

=== Season 1 ===
As a junior associate at a prestigious Chicago law firm, Alicia Florrick joins her longtime friend, former law school classmate and firm partner Will Gardner, who is interested in rekindling their former relationship. The firm's top litigator and other partner, Diane Lockhart, likes Alicia's work and her connections, so she and Will award her with a full-time associate position following a trial period. Alicia beats out Cary Agos, a clever young attorney who takes a job in the state's attorney's office, now bitter and vengeful. Alicia finds an ally and a friend in Kalinda, the firm's tough and mysterious in-house investigator. Gaining confidence every day, Alicia transforms herself from embarrassed politician's scorned wife to resilient career woman, especially for the sake of providing a stable home for her children, 14-year-old Zach and 13-year-old Grace. Now that Peter is back home and planning to run for office again with help from Eli Gold, his cunning image consultant, Alicia continues to redefine herself and her role in her family's life.

=== Season 2 ===
Season two begins where season one left off, with Will confessing his affection for Alicia and Alicia asking if he has a plan. Before the plan is conceived, however, Eli Gold takes possession of Alicia's phone and deletes a pivotal voicemail. Alicia, now under the impression that Will has lost interest in her, suppresses her feelings for Will, and the workplace environment becomes awkward when they are in vicinity of each other. With Alicia as a 2nd year associate after being chosen over Cary Agos, who has now been hired as a Deputy State's Attorney leading to Lockhart & Gardner, they often find themselves battling each other in court. Peter, now released from prison and cleared of charges, begins his campaign to run as State's Attorney against current State's Attorney Glenn Childs. A new main partner, Derrick Bond, joins the firm Lockhart & Gardner—now known as Lockhart Gardner & Bond. However, a feud between Diane and Will occurs when Will begins siding with Derrick Bond's suggestions. Diane requests Kalinda to check into Will's and Derrick's past. She discovers that they had a connection in Will's old law firm in Baltimore. At the same time, a new investigator joins the law firm—Blake Calamar. Brought in by Derrick Bond, he is determined to uncover Kalinda's past. When Will discovers that Bond has also been deceiving him, Will and Diane work together to remove Bond as a main partner, but wait until Bond brings in a "super PAC" (political action committee) client worth $100 million a year. Blake and Alicia feud, and Blake eventually uncovers that Kalinda had changed her name from "Leela" and that Leela slept with Peter Florrick when she used to work for him in the State's Attorney's office. Alicia finds out about the affair on the night that Peter wins the election for State's Attorney. Now separated from Peter, she develops stronger feelings for Will and begins a sexual relationship with him.

=== Season 3 ===
Season three takes place the following morning after season two with Alicia now as a third year litigator on track to become partner while having an affair with her boss Will Gardner. She is given an office on the 29th floor, the only third year litigator with an office on that floor. Peter Florrick's crisis manager Eli Gold joins the firm to prepare for Peter's campaign for governorship of Illinois, while Alicia acts as a bridge between Lockhart & Gardner and his campaign. Peter, now as State's Attorney, battles with Lockhart & Gardner from case to case while the firm begins to get a short-term liquidity problem. Diane and Will try to acquire a bankruptcy department from a competing law firm that is closing down due to the double dip recession, and they notice that a bankruptcy department is the only area that will survive a double dip recession. When Diane tries lobbying to become the State's Attorney's Civil Defender, she begins to suspect an affair between Will and Alicia. The affair, however, ends by mid-season after Alicia realizes she has been putting her needs before those of her children. The second half of the season focuses on Will Gardner being indicted for a crime he committed in his old law firm and ultimately being suspended for six months. Peter decides to run for governor of Illinois and Kalinda's past comes back as it is revealed she has a husband who is searching for her.

=== Season 4 ===
Season four focuses on Lockhart & Gardner's efforts to come out from bankruptcy after rival lawyers Louis Canning and Patti Nyholm team up to take them down. A trustee, Clarke Hayden, is appointed to watch over the firm, but Will and Diane are not happy once he starts getting in their way. Trying to gain money, the firm offers partnership to some associates, because they need their initial payment. When the debt is cleared, only Alicia is made partner and the other offers are delayed. Feeling angry, Cary teams up with the other fourth-years to start a new firm. Peter Florrick runs for governor. Eli is once again leading his campaign, although things get complicated when he finds out he is being investigated. Alicia befriends Maddie Hayward, who sponsors her husband's campaign, but ultimately it turns out she is running up against him and Mike Kresteva. Kalinda's past comes to haunt her in the form of her husband Nick. Once he starts threatening people in her life, she needs to get rid of him. The firm also hires a new investigator to help her at work – Robyn Burdine. On top of all, Alicia is back with Peter, but having a hard time suppressing her feelings for Will. Season 4 ends with Peter Florrick winning the race as governor of Illinois and Alicia deciding to quit Lockhart Gardner and join Cary Agos in forming a new firm.

=== Season 5 ===
Season five takes place after Alicia joins Cary in opening a new firm. They take some of Lockhart Gardner's (now known as LG) clients, but they need to survive under the fierce backlash of their ex-employers. After winning the elections, Peter is now governor. Eli is his chief of staff and is having some problems with Marylin Garbanza, director of the governor's Ethics Commission. Meanwhile, the investigation of a ballot box, full of fake votes for Peter, may ruin his career. At the end of episode 15, Will Gardner is fatally shot in a courtroom by his client. This had a tremendous effect on many of the characters, particularly Alicia, Diane and Kalinda, all of whom reconsidered the course of their respective careers following his death. Finn Polmar was also introduced as a new ASA who befriends Alicia. Alicia decides to split up with Peter but will stay married in the public eye, as it benefits both of their careers. Louis Canning joins Lockhart Gardner as a partner and keeps Will's name on the letterhead, making the firm "Lockhart Gardner and Canning"; he and David Lee plot to kick Diane out of the firm. At the end of Season 5, Diane asks if she could join Florrick Agos with her $38 million in clients. Zach goes away to college and Eli asks Alicia if she would run for State's Attorney.

=== Season 6 ===
Season six begins with Cary getting arrested having been charged with helping traffic $1.3 million worth of heroin. Diane's offer to join Florrick Agos stands on the condition she gets an equal vote with Alicia and Cary. David Lee and Louis Canning get suspicious of Diane when she declares her intention to retire. Against Alicia's wishes, Eli conducts polling on a potential campaign for the State's Attorney office for Alicia and discovers that she has a very good chance of winning against the incumbent. With Cary in jail, Diane joins Florrick Agos to form Florrick, Agos & Lockhart. Cary is let out on bail but, when he inadvertently violates the conditions of his bail by going to an out-of-state college reunion, the terms of his bail are revised and he is not allowed within 30 feet of Kalinda. An FBI wiretap reveals that Lemond Bishop plans to assassinate Cary because he fears Cary might turn. Bishop also pressures Kalinda into spying on her lover, Lana Delany. When all seems lost at his trial Cary takes a 4-year plea deal, but he's later cleared of all charges due, in part, to evidence that Kalinda tampers with. Diane finds a provision in the Lockhart, Gardner & Canning office building contract and, in a hostile takeover, evicts Canning and Lee, enabling Florrick, Agos & Lockhart to move in. Alicia Florrick wins the race for the State's Attorney's office over her competition, talkshow personality Frank Prady. Florrick, Agos & Lockhart are attacked by hackers and five years of emails are leaked online in retaliation for their participation in a piracy case. Alicia is interviewed by journalist Petra Moritz in a post-election "puff piece" where she, unsuccessfully, tries to exploit Alicia's past with Will via the hacked emails. When Alicia and Peter work together to thwart the bad press, Petra alleges that Alicia committed voter fraud by rigging voting machines. Alicia is then forced to resign as State's Attorney by the Democratic Party to divert attention away from the fact that the voting machines were rigged to protect a more important Democratic candidate and ensure the party's super majority in the state senate. Andrew Wiley investigates the state's attorney's Brady violation against Cary and discovers Kalinda's fake evidence. Using the fraudulent evidence in Cary's case as leverage, Geneva Pine takes advantage of their affection for each other by separately pressuring Kalinda and Cary to get evidence against Bishop. Kalinda successfully copies information from Bishop's computer onto a flash drive and attempts to frame a high-ranking member of Bishop's crew. Bishop is arrested, but his associates realize that Kalinda was responsible. In danger, she says goodbye to Cary and Diane and leaves a note for Alicia. Cary then goes to Kalinda's apartment and finds it completely cleared out and ransacked. Kalinda is on the run.

=== Season 7 ===
Season seven begins with Alicia resisting going to work with Louis Canning and deciding to let Peter run for vice-president (as Hillary Clinton's running mate). Eli hires Ruth Eastman (Margo Martindale); however, she becomes Peter's campaign officer, leaving Eli out. Alicia, taking cases by herself, hires private investigator Jason Crouse (Jeffrey Dean Morgan) in Kalinda's absence. Alicia finds a new ally in bar attorney Lucca Quinn (Cush Jumbo) and the two become friends, sharing cases. In the latter part of the season, Peter gets investigated for another corruption charge involving murder during his second term as State's Attorney by Assistant U.S. Attorney Connor Fox. Peter hires Elsbeth Tascioni's ex-husband Mike Tascioni after noting a conflict of interest. As Alicia throws a house party for Peter's mother, Jackie Florrick, Mike drops out, leaving Diane to represent Peter in his trial. Alicia asks Peter for a divorce and he agrees to it, once his trial is over. After Jason tells Alicia she will never divorce Peter if he goes to jail, Alicia focuses all her efforts on proving Peter's innocence, especially when Grace tells her she won't go to college if her father gets arrested. Alicia discovers a way to prove Peter's innocence by discrediting Diane's husband Kurt McVeigh after he made a mistake on the case when analyzing the guns used in the murder. After an argument with Diane, Alicia convinces Lucca to cross examine him on the stand, alluding to Kurt's indiscretions and infidelity leaving Diane humiliated. Eli begins moving political donors away from Peter, noting that it was Alicia all along who has real political potential even after a failed State's Attorney campaign. Peter is offered and takes a deal where he doesn't have to go to prison, but must resign from office as governor; he also begins divorce proceedings with Alicia but asks her to stand by his side one last time as he resigns from office. At his press conference, Alicia thinks she sees Jason waiting for her in a hallway and as soon the press conference finishes, walks off immediately, leaving Peter behind. After finding out it wasn't Jason waiting for her, Alicia is approached by Diane, who slaps her and walks off. Alicia is left alone in the hallway before fixing herself up and wiping away tears.

== Technology and the Internet ==
The Good Wife has been well received among technology enthusiasts, being described by Clive Thompson of Wired as "the most tech-savvy show on TV", even though several of its main characters were skeptical of or inept in using technology. The show has explored the relationship between technology and the law, covering topics including Bitcoin, Anonymous, viral marketing in political campaigns, voice control software, crisis management in the controversial AT&T and T-Mobile merger, virtual conferencing robots, and NSA surveillance. For example, one of the firm's recurring clients is a fictional internet search company known as ChumHum, which among other issues has faced privacy lawsuits for selling users' personal data to the Chinese and Syrian government. The Good Wife was the first TV show to feature Bitcoin, the virtual internet currency, with an episode featuring Bitcoin first broadcast in January 2012. This led to it achieving a high level of fame amongst the Bitcoin community.

In the season five premiere, a Double Robotics robot was featured on the show which allowed a litigator to teleconference from home by controlling a tablet on wheels. However, rather than glorifying the robot's features, The Good Wife turned it into a punchline with practical jokes and problems the robot could have such as it not being able to maneuver around an office and bumping into walls, doors, and people and low Wi-Fi connectivity leading to buffering and loss of visual and voice communication of the person working at home. In season five episode nine, "Whack-a-Mole," The Good Wife featured a version of Reddit called "Scabbit" and how it affects the law and the downsides of having an "average joe" being an investigator trying to find a domestic terrorist. It also deals with injunctions of taking down a defamatory web page on "Scabbit" but having another similar web page pop up soon after. In season five episode eleven, "Goliath and David," the story is based around a TV show Drama Camp who stole an indie band's cover of a rap song and deals with the legality of copyright infringement. It was inspired by Jonathan Coulton who created a cover of "Baby Got Back" and Glee, the TV series, which used an identical cover on the show. The character Robyn Burdine, a private investigator for Florrick/Agos, discovers that the show Drama Camp had to release the song on iTunes in Sweden before releasing it in the US and that the engineers directly ripped the indie band's track constituting actual theft.

In season six episode two, the show tackles employee poaching in the workplace for social media companies and employee wage-fixing by The Good Wife's Google stand-in "ChumHum" and how they worked with other companies to fix employees' salaries. In season six episode five, Florrick, Agos and Lockhart deal with ransomware on the office computers. In season six episode fifteen, the episode revolves around the case of a 3D printed gun that misfired and hit an innocent bystander. It takes an in-depth look at 3D printing and how modifications to CAD design, the printer model being used, and the environment a 3D printer is being used in can affect how an object is created and second amendment laws for downloadable firearms. In season six episode seventeen, "Undisclosed Recipients", the law firm's email system gets hacked as retaliation for a case with a movie studio suing "Wharf Master", the show's stand in for an illegal torrenting website. This begins an arc when the hackers forward further emails to Petra Morris, a journalist who is making a puff piece about Alicia Florrick's recent win for state's attorney. This leads to a voter fraud conspiracy resulting in an innocent Alicia withdrawing her name from contention for the State's Attorney's office.

Season seven dealt with topics such as self-driving cars, Google's racial facial detection, racial bias in online mapping applications, and the NSA. Season seven episode fourteen deals with a case mirroring the missing iPhone Four prototype with a ChumHum iPad-like tablet. Season seven episode eighteen deals with the topic of regulating the use of drones and its impact on privacy versus commerce discussions.

== Reception ==
The Good Wife "stands out among newer fall shows" and is "miles ahead of anything else that's on at the moment", The New York Times noted. A decade after The Good Wife left the air, The New York Times named it one of the top 100 shows of the 21st century. In a special issue devoted to television, the international quarterly Salmagundi praised the show as fully "on the side of adulthood and a certain kind of seasoned intelligence". In reviewing the earlier episodes, many critics lauded the acting. The Chicago Tribune said: "one of the best parts of the show is Alicia's complicated relationship with her husband, who humiliated his family with a sex scandal but also appears to be a pawn in a larger game being played by high-level politicians". The New York Daily News said, "Margulies puts a powerful combination of cold fury, bewilderment and tenacity into Alicia Florrick, the wife of a disgraced Chicago politician in a new series that readily admits it ripped itself from the headlines" while The Baltimore Sun predicted that "With all four [actors] bringing their 'A' games to the pilot, it looks as if CBS could have another winning 10 o'clock drama." There were a few reservations as to the long-term success and plot of the show, with the San Francisco Chronicle concluding that "There's nothing inherently wrong with The Good Wife other than it's a legal series with too many close-up shots of knowing glances and 'attagirl Alicia' moments of empowerment that you saw coming 20 minutes prior." Time Magazine's James Poniewozik named it one of the Top 10 TV Series of 2010 and 2011, saying, "The ability to keep growing: that's what makes a good Wife great." The Salt Lake Tribune in its list of the Top 10 series of 2011 ranked The Good Wife No. 3, explaining "The mix of fascinating legal drama and even more fascinating personal drama is superb."

Verne Gay of Newsday said, "Like Mad Men, Wife has an obsessive attention to detail; it's a hurricane of detail, in the visual touches, legal patter and the actors' unspoken flourishes. Nothing seems extraneous or out of place. Also like Men, this show cares as much about silence as words, or that which isn't said (also a form of eloquence)." Emily St. James of The A.V. Club said: "The series also feels impeccably researched and lived-in, just as The Wire did. The Good Wife may not seem like the logical successor to The Wire on the surface, but it's revealed itself to be a series nearly as complex, humane, and deep as that earlier show, and all in reduced network running-times with heightened restrictions on content." Bim Adewunmi of The Guardian wrote: "But as the 100th episode – part of a near-flawless season five – shows, The Good Wife is uncommonly good. If you're looking for a quality drama box set to escape the family this Christmas, look no further. It has no smoking, brooding male anti-hero, and it's not a period piece, but The Good Wife is exciting and smart and underrated". The Guardian referred to The Good Wife as a "miracle of the small screen" that was "not really seen on that scale since the days of Cagney and Lacey".

As a broadcast network television show which is usually stigmatised compared to its cable competitors, it has received what is considered unusual acclaim: USA Today said that The Good Wife is "broadcast's best drama", while The Atlantic said that the show "is delivering the best drama on network television". TIME referred to it as "the best thing on TV outside cable". TV critic Emily Nussbaum of The New Yorker compared Alicia Florrick, the show's protagonist, to Walter White of Breaking Bad. Esquire called The Good Wife "The Best Show on Television Right Now (Both Network and Cable)," claiming that the season five episodes "Hitting The Fan" and "The Next Day" were possibly the best television episodes produced that year, noting, "It's a rare show that starts to come into its own in the middle of its fifth season, but somehow CBS's The Good Wife has managed to do it." Chancellor Agard of The Daily Beast said, "'Hitting the Fan' is so momentous because of the degree to which it contrasts with last week's equally excellent episode, 'Outside the Bubble'." Don Kaplan of the New York Daily News said, "Now the drama's in its fifth season, a time when most shows either go on autopilot or start offering "very special" shark-jumping episodes. But the producers and cast of Wife somehow managed to kick over the chessboard where the show has been played for years, scattering the pieces to the wind and reinventing The Good Wife as one of the most gripping dramas on television. Period." It was named the Favorite Current TV Show by the Harris Poll. In 2013, TV Guide ranked the series #59 on its list of the 60 Best Series of All Time.

Rolling Stone described seasons six and seven as a "study in sprawl, with dozens of stranded characters and dead-end storylines: Alicia spent the show's sixth season running for political office only to end up right back where she started". Salon stated that season six "fell apart, seemingly overnight in the latter part of the season. On the eve of the finale, it's hard to tell what this season has been about: We watched an election, a stint in prison, an investigation of a drug dealer, and the aftereffects of voter fraud, but it has been difficult to assemble the events into a cohesive narrative." Season seven has received criticism for the "incredibly uneven [plotting], sucking so much of the vitality and urgency out of the show". Variety noted that in season seven that "there were notably more of subplots and segues that were, at best, time-fillers and at worst, eyeroll-inducing" and said it "was obvious that it was time for the show to go". TV.com observed that "obituaries for the show were already burying it instead of praising it, pointing to where it all went wrong, or that it wasn't even truly that great to begin with. An episode like 'End' solidified a lot of those arguments." The New York Times opined that season seven "never sparkled or caught fire the way the series did in its best seasons, when it was broadcast television's leading argument for continued relevance in the peak-TV era. The weekly legal cases — the show was resolutely procedural almost to the end — were still intelligently devised and briskly dispatched, but they felt familiar and not very urgent, and more than ever seemed to be lecturing viewers about current events", which was further "pummeled by cast defections and bad decisions".

The finale episode of The Good Wife, "End", generated a divided reaction among viewers and critics, with many praising it as a fitting ending to a complex character with others who argued of its ambiguity and absence of a conclusion – particularly with Alicia's love life. The finale drew controversy in its last scene when Diane Lockhart slaps Alicia Florrick for having betrayed her in court to save Peter from jail. Alicia is then left alone in a hallway before walking away to a future of uncertainty regarding her relationship with Jason, her career, and political life. Vanity Fair noting "As Breaking Bad famously tracked the evolution of Walter White 'from Mr. Chips to Scarface,' The Good Wife followed Alicia as she evolved into Peter. The Kings claim the show was 'moving in the direction where there wasn't much difference between who Alicia was and who her husband was.' Is Alicia a villain or an anti-hero? It's hard to quite see her that way after all the good she's done for so many seasons. But the inclusion of Will Gardner in the finale momentarily humanizes Alicia while also highlighting the idea that Alicia's transformation into Peter has been a longtime coming," and claiming that "the show's incredible finale belongs to an earlier age of television." Emily Nussbaum of The New Yorker said "it was an ending that commanded respect".

The ensemble cast of The Good Wife had been praised as "one of the best casts in television, and it was supplemented with an awe-inspiring array of guest stars — one way for the Kings to flaunt the advantages of a network budget. Half the cast of The Wire passed through its halls, as did more Broadway stars than there are in heaven", although at the end of the series the guest stars were increasingly placed in "throwaway roles". However, with the exit of male lead Josh Charles (who played Will Gardner) in season five, Kayla Kumari Upadhyaya of The A.V. Club opined that the show's "writers really struggled to rebuild that same type of long-term emotional storytelling. His departure left a gap that was never fully filled again." While reviewers acknowledged that Charles's departure was inevitable (and praised how Will was written off dramatically), they questioned decisions made by the writers for seasons six and seven that further hurt the show. Archie Panjabi's portrayal of Kalinda Sharma was well-regarded during the first three seasons, but Sonia Saraiya of Salon felt that her character ended up sidelined by a much-criticized plotline in seasons four to six, amid a rumored rift between Panjabi and producer Julianna Margulies where they did not share any screen time for their final 50 episodes.

In addition to Silda Spitzer, critics have noted parallels of the storylines to Huma Abedin and Hillary Clinton, the latter of whom has said that she enjoyed the show and appeared with Julianna Margulies at a charity dinner while the show was running.

In a 2024 article, Vulture looked back on the shocking nature of Josh Charles' character Will Gardner's death ten years later.

== TV ratings ==
Season	Episodes	Timeslot (ET)	Original airing			Rank	Viewers (in millions)
Season	Episodes	Timeslot (ET)	Season premiere	Season finale	TV season	Rank	Viewers (in millions)
1	23	Tuesday 10:00 pm	September 22, 2009	May 25, 2010	2009–10	18	13.12
2	23	Tuesday 10:00 pm	September 28, 2010	May 17, 2011	2010–11	16	13.00
3	22	Sunday 9:00 pm	September 25, 2011	April 29, 2012	2011–12	26	11.83
4	22	Sunday 9:00 pm	September 30, 2012	April 28, 2013	2012–13	27	10.98
5	22	Sunday 9:00 pm	September 29, 2013	May 18, 2014	2013–14	23	11.43
6	22	Sunday 9:00 pm	September 21, 2014	May 10, 2015	2014–15	22	12.17
7	22	Sunday 9:00 pm	October 4, 2015	May 8, 2016	2015–16	27	10.84

=== DVR ratings ===
Season Averages in Live+7 DVR Ratings:

- season 1: 14 million viewers|DVR ratings: million
- season 2: 14.059 million viewers|DVR ratings: 2.257 million
- season 3: 12.100 million viewers|DVR ratings: 1.880 million
- season 4: 11.523 million viewers|DVR ratings: 2.075 million
- season 5: 12. million viewers|DVR ratings: million
- season 6: 12.268 million |DVR ratings: 2.522 million
  - 2013: With 11.7 million viewers, the series ranks at No. 36 among American TV primetime series. Among 18 to 49 viewers (106); 34 and under (223).

== Awards and nominations ==
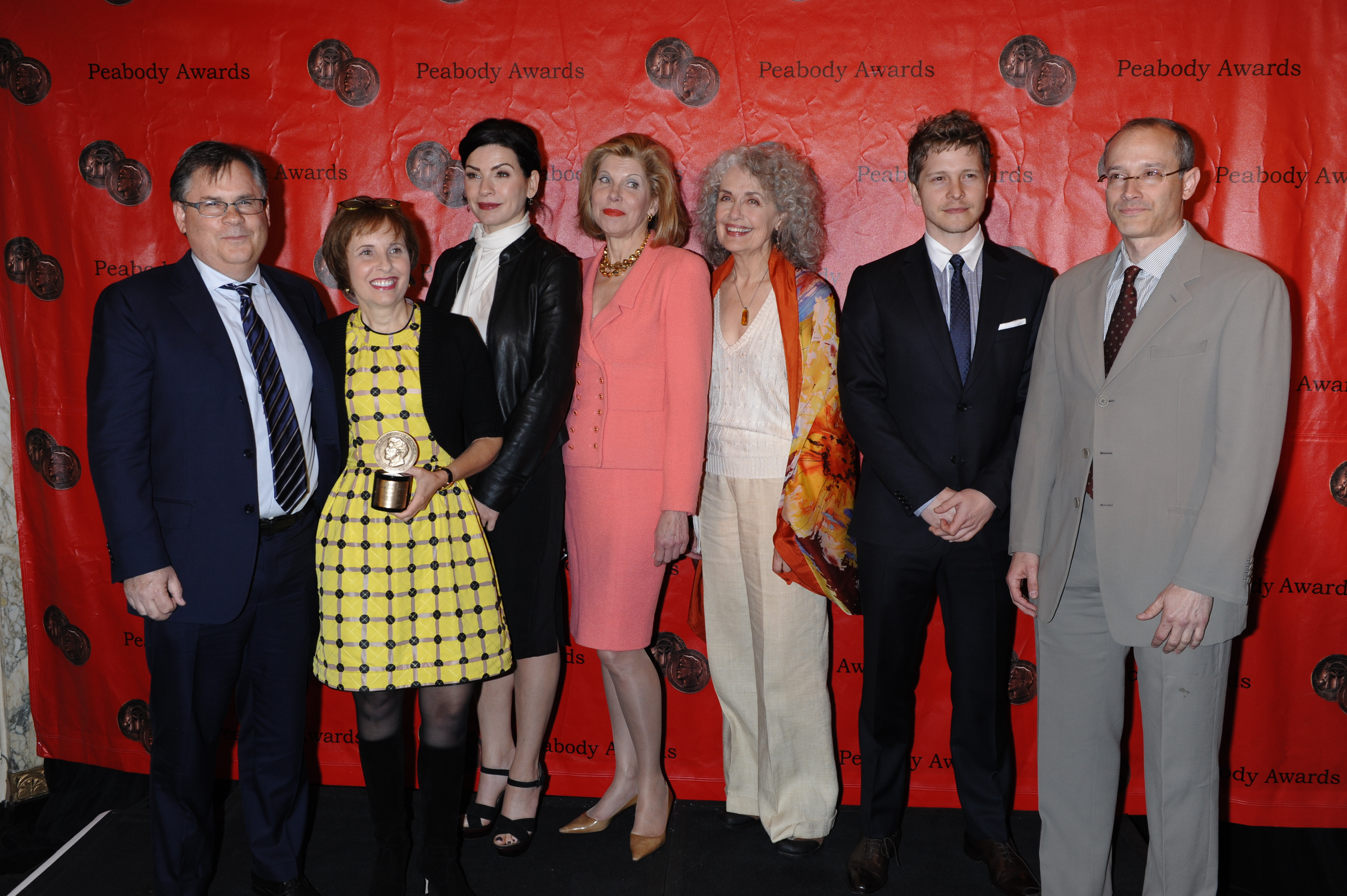
Robert King, Michelle King, Julianna Margulies, Christine Baranski, Mary Beth Peil, Matt Czuchry and David Zucker of The Good Wife at the 70th Annual Peabody Awards

The series and its cast have won a number of awards. Julianna Margulies has been widely recognized for her portrayal in the lead role, winning the Primetime Emmy Award, Golden Globe Award, Critics' Choice Television Award, TCA Award for Individual Achievement in Drama, and twice for the Screen Actors Guild Award. The series has also been nominated for five Golden Globe Awards in its first four seasons, with Margulies winning the Golden Globe Award for Best Actress – Television Series Drama for the first half of the first season in 2010. In addition, the series won a Peabody Award in 2010, and has been thrice nominated for the Screen Actors Guild Award for Outstanding Performance by an Ensemble in a Drama Series and twice nominated for the Primetime Emmy Award for Outstanding Drama Series. In total, the series and its cast have been nominated for 35 Primetime Emmy Awards in its first five seasons.

In 2010, Archie Panjabi won the Primetime Emmy Award for Outstanding Supporting Actress in a Drama Series for her portrayal as Kalinda Sharma. In 2011, Julianna Margulies won the Primetime Emmy Award for Outstanding Lead Actress in a Drama Series for her portrayal as Alicia Florrick. In 2012, Martha Plimpton won the Primetime Emmy Award for Outstanding Guest Actress in a Drama Series for her portrayal as Patti Nyholm. In 2013, Carrie Preston won the Primetime Emmy Award for Outstanding Guest Actress in a Drama Series for playing Elsbeth Tascioni. Nathan Lane was nominated for his guest role as Clarke Hayden. In 2014, Julianna Margulies won her second Primetime Emmy Award for Outstanding Lead Actress in a Drama Series for her work on The Good Wife with the winning episode "The Last Call". On December 12, 2013, the series received three Golden Globe Award nominations for Best Television Series – Drama, Best Actress – Television Series Drama (Margulies), and Best Supporting Actor – Series, Miniseries, or Television Film (Charles). On May 28, 2014, the series was nominated for five Critics' Choice Television Awards for Best Drama Series, Best Actress in a Drama Series (Margulies), Best Supporting Actor in a Drama Series (Charles), Best Supporting Actress in a Drama Series (Baranski), and Best Guest Performer in a Drama Series (Preston).

== Broadcast ==
On October 7, 2009, CBS gave the series a full-season pickup, extending the first season from 13 to 22 episodes, later extended to 23 episodes.

=== Syndication ===
The Good Wife has been sold in a complex multi-window deal that involves two streaming partners, Amazon and Hulu; a basic cable network, Hallmark Channel; for $400,000 per episode and broadcast syndication, for a combined license fee of nearly $2 million per episode. "This is an off-network model for a unique serialized show in today's television ecosystem," said Leslie Moonves, President and CEO, CBS Corporation.

Under the deal, the first six seasons of The Good Wife are available on Amazon Prime. Hulu Plus rolled out previous seasons of the show in September 2013, while Hallmark Channel, which reportedly paid $350,000 and $400,000 per episode, began airing The Good Wife in January 2014. However, not long after premiering on the Hallmark Channel the show was pulled from the schedule. A weekend broadcast syndication run is scheduled to begin in September 2014, with the series sold in 85% of the country. The show received an average of 331,000 viewers on Hallmark Channel.

Since 2018, the show has re-aired on the Start TV channel. Pluto TV added a Good Wife-themed free ad-supported channel in October 2024, with selected seasons also available on demand. The full series has been made available on Paramount+ and for free ad-supported on the Roku Channel.

=== International ===
- In the United Kingdom, Channel 4 began airing The Good Wife on January 25, 2010. The series was later moved to More4 due to a drop in ratings during the first season. The network aired seasons two to six. The seventh season premiered in January 2016.
- In China, online video streaming websites Youku and Sohu had licensed the series until a government ban forced them to remove the show from their websites in April 2014. According to Julianna Margulies, the ban was due to an episode regarding NSA espionnage.

== Spin-offs ==
=== The Good Fight ===
Michelle and Robert King stated in February 2016 that there was a possibility for a spin-off series. By May, CBS was in final negotiations to set up a spin-off, featuring Christine Baranski reprising her role as Diane Lockhart, that would air on streaming service CBS All Access instead of the network, and it was officially ordered to series on May 18 with Cush Jumbo returning as well.

In September 2016, it was confirmed that the 10-episode series would premiere in February 2017. The story picks up a year after the final episode of the original series, with Diane pushed out of her firm after a financial scam wipes out her savings, resulting in her move to Lucca Quinn's firm. Sarah Steele was also added to the cast, returning as Marissa Gold and appearing as Diane Lockhart's secretary-turned-investigator. In October 2016, former Game of Thrones star Rose Leslie was confirmed to play the role of Diane's goddaughter Maia, and Delroy Lindo was added as Adrian Boseman. Paul Guilfoyle and Bernadette Peters were cast as Maia's parents. The series' title The Good Fight was announced on October 31, 2016.

=== Elsbeth ===
On January 31, 2023, it was announced that CBS had ordered a pilot for a new spin-off series titled Elsbeth, starring Carrie Preston. It was picked up by CBS for the 2023–24 American television season on May 9, 2023. It premiered on February 29, 2024.

== International remakes ==
The Good Wife has been adapted or remade in various countries:

- In South Korea, a deal was made between Studio Dragon and CBS International for a localized remake series of The Good Wife. The 16-episode miniseries premiered July 8, 2016, on tvN sharing the same name (Korean translation: 굿 와이프) and premise except the show examines politics and corruption in Seoul rather than in Chicago. The show was highly anticipated because it featured the return of one of Korea's biggest actresses, Jeon Do-yeon, to television after 11 years. It is the first ever American show to be remade in Korea.
- In Japan, a deal was made with CBS international for a localized remake series of The Good Wife, it premiered in January 2019 on TBS, under the same name (Japanese translation: グッドワイフ).
- In Russia, Sony Pictures Television produced a localized remake series of The Good Wife. It was broadcast on the national network NTV from November to December 2019; it shared the same title as the American original.
- In Ireland on June 20, 2016, a 4-part drama series called Cheaters was ordered on RTÉ One, starring Irish actress Amy Huberman, which is based on The Good Wife. The premise follows Tara, a solicitor who returns to work in law and start her own firm after learning that her husband has cheated. The show, later titled Striking Out, ran for ten episodes over two seasons.
- In India, the show was adapted in two languages. Disney+ Hotstar created a Hindi-language version adaptation of the show titled The Trial with Kajol in the lead. Mallika Sherawat also announced that she will be starring and producing an adaptation of the show in India. Tamil-language remake titled Good Wife is directed by Revathi and stars Priyamani, Aari Arujunan, Sampath Raj, Mekha Rajan and Amrutha Srinivasan. The show premiered July 4, 2025 on JioHotstar.
- In China, a remake was produced as Rose War. The 40-episode series aired from August 8 to 27, 2022, on CCTV-8 channel of the China Central Television Network.
- In Vietnam, national television VTV made a deal with CBS for a localized remake series. It premiered on October 10, 2022, on VTV3 under the name Journey to Justice (Vietnamese translation: Hành Trình Công Lý).
