= In Justice =

American police procedural television series

- Genre: Legal drama
- Created by: Michelle King; Robert King
- Starring: Jason O'Mara; Kyle MacLachlan; Marisol Nichols; Constance Zimmer; Daniel Cosgrove
- Country of origin: United States
- Original language: English
- No. of seasons: 1
- No. of episodes: 13

Production
- Executive producers: Robert King; Michelle King; Jeff Melvoin; Stu Bloomberg
- Producers: Matthew Carlisle; Kyle MacLachlan; Jason O'Mara
- Running time: 45 minutes
- Production companies: Spud TV; King Size Productions; Touchstone Television

Original release
- Network: ABC
- Release: January 1 – March 31, 2006

In Justice is an American legal drama television series created by Michelle King and Robert King. The series began airing on Sunday, January 1, 2006, on ABC as a midseason replacement and assumed its regular night and time on Friday, January 6, 2006, at 9 p.m. EST. It ended after its 13-episode run on March 31, 2006. The series was simulcast in Canada on CTV. In the UK In Justice was shown on UKTV Gold beginning September 17, 2006 and was later repeated on ABC1 in 2007.

On May 16, 2006, ABC cancelled the series. Series creators Michelle and Robert King went on to develop the series The Good Wife.

== Premise ==
In Justice focuses on freeing wrongly convicted criminals. Kyle MacLachlan (of Twin Peaks) stars as David Swain, a wealthy and successful lawyer who heads a high-profile organization called the National Justice Project (commonly abbreviated as "NJP") in the San Francisco Bay Area, along with his lead investigator, ex–police detective Charles Conti (portrayed by Jason O'Mara). Members of the National Justice Project work pro-bono to overturn wrongful convictions, liberate the falsely accused and discover the identity of those who are really to blame. Although the NJP is fictional, there are organizations which examine cases involving people who may have been wrongly convicted (e.g. the Innocence Project).

Each new episode starts out with "what the jury believed", usually a scene in which the person who was wrongly convicted acts out the crime. Throughout the show, David and Charles unravel many clues to how and why the person they are trying to exonerate was convicted in the first place.

Each episode revolves around separate cases and addresses the various reasons for miscarriage of justice. The progress in the show relies less on the famous but largely fictitious forensic procedures used in the CSI franchise and other procedural shows. In a few episodes "CSI-fiction" is mentioned as a description of theatre and inaccuracy, and sometimes forgery of forensics technology.

The series deals with a few subplots. The most prominent is Conti's remorse from his time as a police officer, when he caused an innocent suspect's suicide by coercing him to confess to the murder of his family, and how it makes him obsessed with clearing the wrongfully convicted. Other subplots deals with Swain's uneasy relationship with judicial colleagues and the district attorney's attempts to discredit him, Sonya's personal motivations for clearing the wrongfully convicted—her brother being one of them—and Brianna's reservations and doubts about some of the cases.

== Cast ==
- Jason O'Mara as Charles Conti
- Kyle MacLachlan as David Swain
- Marisol Nichols as Sonya Quintano
- Constance Zimmer as Brianna
- Daniel Cosgrove as Jon Lemonick
- Tim Guinee as Richard Rocca
- McKinley Freeman as Ray Estevez

== Episodes ==
The show's "sneak-peek" episode aired on January 1, 2006, while the original series pilot was aired on January 6, 2006. According to Variety, the program won its timeslot in the January 1 sneak airing and finished second in its January 6 timeslot, the latter just slightly behind CBS's Close to Home. The eighth episode, "The Public Burning", came in second to NBC's coverage of the Winter Olympics.

No.	Title	Directed by	Written by	Original release date	Prod. code	Viewers (millions)
1	"Brothers and Sisters"	James Frawley	Tom Szentgyörgyi	January 1, 2006	103	10.50
2	"Pilot"	Mick Jackson	Robert King & Michelle King	January 6, 2006	101	9.20
3	"Golden Boy"	Paul Holahan	Robert King & Michelle King	January 13, 2006	102	8.70
4	"Confessions"	Stephen DePaul	Terri Kopp	January 20, 2006	105	8.90
5	"Another Country"	John Contner	Jeff Melvoin	January 27, 2006	104	7.60
6	"The Ten Percenter"	David Straiton	Henry Robles	February 3, 2006	107	8.80
7	"Cost of Freedom"	Paul Holahan	Barry M. Schkolnick	February 10, 2006	106	8.41
8	"The Public Burning"	Marita Grabiak	Michael Oates Palmer	February 17, 2006	108	8.33
9	"Victims"	Kevin Bray	Courtney Kemp	March 3, 2006	109	6.60
10	"Badge of Honor"	Peter Medak	Marc Guggenheim	March 10, 2006	110	5.09
11	"Lovers"	J. Miller Tobin	Terri Kopp & Karen Campbell	March 17, 2006	111	6.51
12	"Side Man"	Paul Holahan	Michael Oates Palmer & Barry M. Schkolnick	March 24, 2006	112	6.72
13	"Crossing the Line"	Paul Holahan	Henry Robles	March 31, 2006	113	5.52

The team succeeds in clearing a convicted person in each episode, except in "The Public Burning", where justice fails and a mildly mentally challenged man is executed just minutes before truth is revealed (though it is unclear if the team were able to expose the killer, since Conti confronts the murderer in his house).

== Reception ==
On Rotten Tomatoes the series has an approval rating of 40% based on reviews from 10 critics. The site's consensus states: "In Justice brandishes a refreshingly righteous premise, but this derivative procedural's good intentions can't vindicate the indistinctive casting and uninspired cases". On Metacritic, the series has a score of 48% based on reviews from 16 critics, indicating "mixed or average reviews".

David Hinckley of the New York Daily News compared the show to Without a Trace and Cold Case. He wrote: "The chemistry among the leads isn't fully there, and the trail of clues, at least in the opening two episodes, relies on a lot of serendipity and improbable deductive work. But In Justice is a watchable show."

Phil Gallo of Variety called the show "A model of midseason mediocrity". Tom Shales of The Washington Post wrote: "It's an imitation of something already being imitated here, there and everywhere." Tim Goodman of the San Francisco Chronicle called the show "a mess" and was critical of ABC for not knowing what they wanted the show to be.

== See also ==
- List of wrongful convictions in the United States
