= The Good Wife (South Korean TV series) =

2016 remake of American TV series

- Promotional poster
- Hangul: 굿 와이프
- RR: Gut waipeu
- MR: Kut waip'ŭ
- Genre: Drama
- Based on: The Good Wife by Robert King & Michelle King
- Developed by: Studio Dragon
- Written by: Han Sang-woon
- Directed by: Lee Jeong-hyo
- Starring: Jeon Do-yeon; Yoo Ji-tae; Yoon Kye-sang
- Composer: Nam Hye-seung
- Country of origin: South Korea
- Original language: Korean
- No. of episodes: 16

Production
- Executive producers: Jo Moon-joo; Jinnie Choi; Kim Young-kyu
- Producers: Han So-jin; Lee So-yoon
- Production locations: Choi Yoon-man; Han Hwi-soo
- Editors: Lee Hyun-mi; Kwon Hyo-rim
- Production company: Studio Dragon (Note: Under license from CBS Television Distribution)

Original release
- Network: tvN
- Release: July 8 – August 27, 2016

The Good Wife (Korean: 굿 와이프) is a South Korean television series starring Jeon Do-yeon, Yoo Ji-tae and Yoon Kye-sang. It is a Korean drama remake of the American television series of the same title which aired on CBS from 2009 to 2016. It replaced Dear My Friends and aired on the cable network tvN every Fridays and Saturdays at 20:30 (KST) for 16 episodes from July 8 to August 27, 2016.

== Premise ==
A courtroom investigative drama about a woman who, after quitting her job following marriage, returns to work as a lawyer to support her family when her once-successful prosecutor husband is imprisoned for political scandal and corruption, ultimately embarking on a journey to rediscover her true identity.

== Cast ==
=== Main ===
- Jeon Do-yeon as Kim Hye-kyung – newly hired lawyer.
- Yoo Ji-tae as Lee Tae-joon – prosecutor, Hye-kyung's husband.
- Yoon Kye-sang as Seo Joong-won – Law firm's co-managing partner (sharing position with his older sister Seo Myung-hee), and friend of Hye-kyung.

=== MJ Law firm ===
- Kim Seo-hyung as Seo Myung-hee – Law firm's co-managing partner (sharing position with her younger brother Seo Joong-won).
- Nana as Kim Dan – Law firm's investigator, Hye-kyung's colleague.
- Lee Won-keun as Lee Joon-ho – newly hired lawyer, Hye-kyung's rival.
- Cha Soon-bae as David Lee – divorce lawyer, Hye-kyung's colleague.

=== People around Lee Tae-joon ===
- Kim Tae-woo as Choi Sang-il – deputy inspector of Seyang District Prosecutors Office, Tae-joon's opponent.
- Jeon Seok-ho as Park Do-seop – inspector of Seyang District Prosecutors Office, Sang-il's right arm.
- Tae In-ho as Oh Joo-hwan – Tae-joon's lawyer.

=== Kim Hye-kyung's family ===
- Sung Yoo-bin as Lee Ji-hoon – Hye-kyung's son.
- Park Si-eun as Lee Seo-yeon – Hye-kyung's daughter.
- Yoon Hyun-min as Kim Sae-byuk - Hye Kyung's younger brother (ep. 13).

=== Extended cast ===
- Choi Byung-mo as Lee Jong-in – the judge in charge of Lee Tae-joon's case and Kim In-young's case
- Yoon Joo-sang as Seo Jae-moon – Joong-won's father
- Ray Yang as Amber
- Bae Hae-sun as Shim Eun-sook – Sang-il's wife..
- Ko Jun as Jo Gook-hyun – steel development's representative, Lee Tae-joon's bribery related person
- Han Gap-soo as Kang Seok-beom – Gook-hyun's driver
- Park Ah-in as Lee Yeon-joo – lawyer
- Oh Yeon-ah as Lee Soo-yeon – lawyer
- Gong Sang-ah as Kim In-young – Park Dong-hyun's wife, suspect of Park Dong-hyun's murder case
- Jung Ji-ho
- Song Ha-rim as apartment security, witness of Park Dong-hyun's murder case
- Lee Young-shil as apartment's cleaning lady
- Na Da-woon
- Park Joo-hee as Do Han-na
- Song Yoo-hyun
- Geum Seo-yeon as Sevi – In-young's daughter
- Chae Dong-hyun as Jang Dae-seok – Mooil Group lawyer
- Uhm Hyun-kyung as Lee Eun-joo – rape victim
- Kim Ki-moo as Kim Sang-man – character accompanied by Lee Eun-joo
- Jung Dong-hyun as Jung Han-wook – 3rd generation chaebeol, suspect of Lee Eun-joo's rape case
- Lee Bong-gyu as talk show's political commentator
- Ahn Hye-kyung as talk show host
- Yoon In-jo as sex shop madame
- Na Soo-yoon as Kim Dan's friend at prosecutor's office
- Kang Hee
- Sung Gi-yoon as the judge in charge of Lee Eun-joo's rape case
- Seol Chang-hee
- Jang Tae-min
- Lee Gi-seop as Jang Dae-seok's junior, witness of Lee Eun-joo's rape case
- Park Seon-im as Hana – Seo Joong-won's meeting woman
- Moon Ah-ram as Choi Yoon-jin – hotel staff
- Jung Da-woon as Kim Ye-ji – Eun-joo's friend
- Kang Jeong-goo
- Kim Ji-eun as Lee Hyo-jin
- Song Young-hak as detective who tried to arrest Jung Han-wook
- Lee Hyun-bae as the judge in charge of Seo Jae-moon's case
- Jo Soon-chang as traffic police
- Lee Yoon-sang as KJ Products's finance director
- Park Chul-min
- Kim Kwang-tae
- Lee Gyu-seop as Cheol-goo
- Jung Seon-ah
- Im Pyung-soon
- Jo Hwi as Sang-il's divorce lawyer
- Do Yool-gok
- Kim Bong-soo as Sai Yoichi
- Park Joo-yong
- Yoon Da-gyeong as Dong-hyun's mother
- Kim Jeong-young as Jae-yeol's mother
- Jung Jae-min as Jung Jae-yeol
- Jung In-wook
- Kang Shin-goo
- Seo Dong-gap
- Ryu Chang-woo
- Jang In-ho
- Kim Jae-heum
- Lee Eun-shil
- Sung Hyun-mi
- Kim Bo-ri
- Han Dae-ryong
- Choo Gwi-jeong as Kim Hee-ae – the judge in charge of Lee Ho-jin's dignity-related case
- Na Cheol as Na Joong-gi – Lee Hyo-jin's common-law relationship husband
- Jeon Seok-chan as Lee Hyo-jin's older brother
- Park Tae-sung as Woo-sung – Lee Hyo-jin's doctor, Joong-won's friend, witness
- Hong Seo-joon as gynecologist – Lee Hyo-jin's related plaintiff witnesses
- Han Tae-il as Lee Hyo-jin's adult relative
- Kim Tae-rang
- Kim Mi-hye as Kim Mi-hye – CNB News reporter
- Kim Jae-cheol
- Kwon Gi-joo
- Kang Sung-cheol as hospital's security team member
- Kang Chan-yang
- Choi Nam-wook
- Seo Hyun-woo as Baek Min-hyuk – inspector
- Kang Dong-yeop
- Seo Hyun-chul as Son Byung-ho – presiding judge, the judge in charge of Lee Tae-joon's case
- Kim Tae-hwan
- Jung Jong-woo
- Choi Hyun-jeong
- Shin Dong-eun
- Hwang Yoon-geol
- Jung Soo-in
- Sung Nak-kyung
- Ha Ji-eun
- Lee Joo-seok as judge
- Park Ji-a as medical staff
- Kim Tae-hwan
- Kim Min-kwang
- Choi Young
- Im Jae-geun
- Go Ah-chim
- Baek Joon-hyuk
- Kim Seo-kyung as Kim Woo-yeol – Kim Dan's colleague at prosecutor's office
- Uhm Soo-jeong as Ji-eun – Park Jeong-jin's wife
- Kang Ki-dong as Jung Shi-yeon's boyfriend
- Lee Myung-haeng as Park Jeong-jin
- Jang Do-yoon
- Kim Bo-hyun as Jung Shi-yeon
- Jo Hye-jin
- Jung Ye-ji as Supporting
- Jin Ki-joo as Song Hee-soo
- Jang Joon-ho as MJ Law firm's fired lawyer
- Lee Ik-joon
- Park Ik-joon
- Kim Hyung-gi
- Kim Do-hae
- Kang Min-seo
- Min Ye-ji
- Park Joo-hee as Do Han-na
- Seo Byung-deok
- Gong Jung-hwan
- Lee Sang-hwa
- Choi Seung-yoon
- Lee Jong-eun
- Kim Joon-won
- Park Seon-young
- Woo Hye-young
- Ha Jin
- Lee Shi-on
- Kim Min-sang
- Choi Myung-gil

=== Special appearance ===
- Park Jung-soo as Oh Jeong-im – Lee Tae-joon's mother.
- Yoo Jae-myung as Son Dong-ho – Lawyer.

== Production ==
The series was directed by Lee Jung-hyo whose prior work includes I Need Romance and A Witch's Love.

== Original soundtrack ==
=== Part 1 ===
No.	Title	Artist	Length
1.	"Breath (숨)"	Nell	5:01
2.	"Breath (숨)" (Inst.)		5:01
Total length:			10:02

=== Part 2 ===
No.	Title	Artist	Length
1.	"The Light"	Jo Jeong-hee (조정희)	3:09
2.	"The Light" (Inst.)		3:09
Total length:			6:18

=== Part 3 ===
No.	Title	Artist	Length
1.	"When I Dream"	Jang Jane	3:51
2.	"When I Dream" (Inst.)		3:51
Total length:			7:42

== Ratings ==
Average TV viewership ratings
Ep.	Original broadcast date	Average audience share		
Ep.	Original broadcast date	Nielsen Korea		TNmS
Ep.	Original broadcast date	Nationwide	Seoul	Nationwide
1	July 8, 2016	3.966%	4.172%	3.2%
2	July 9, 2016	3.765%	3.772%	3.0%
3	July 15, 2016	4.771%	4.715%	4.9%
4	July 16, 2016	4.503%	5.101%	3.2%
5	July 22, 2016	5.382%	6.831%	5.1%
6	July 23, 2016	3.954%	4.970%	3.4%
7	July 29, 2016	5.183%	6.152%	3.8%
8	July 30, 2016	3.887%	4.838%	2.7%
9	August 5, 2016	4.818%	5.322%	4.4%
10	August 6, 2016	4.313%	4.963%	4.2%
11	August 12, 2016	4.455%	4.717%	4.4%
12	August 13, 2016	4.222%	5.110%	4.0%
13	August 19, 2016	5.203%	5.760%	4.3%
14	August 20, 2016	4.108%	4.759%	3.3%
15	August 26, 2016	5.921%	6.487%	4.6%
16	August 27, 2016	6.232%	7.261%	5.3%
Average		4.668%	5.308%	4.0%
In the table above, the blue numbers represent the lowest ratings and the red numbers represent the highest ratings.; This series aired on a cable channel/pay TV which normally has a relatively smaller audience compared to free-to-air TV/public broadcasters (KBS, SBS, MBC and EBS).

== Awards and nominations ==
Year	Award	Category	Recipient	Result	Ref.
2016	5th APAN Star Awards	Best New Actress	Nana	Nominated	
2016	9th Korea Drama Awards	Best New Actress	Nana	Nominated	
2016	1st Asia Artist Awards	Best Rookie Award, Actress	Nana	Won	
2017	53rd Baeksang Arts Awards	Best New Actress (TV)	Nana	Nominated	
2017	11th Cable TV Broadcasting Awards	Cable Star Award – Best Acting	Yoo Ji-tae	Won	

== Remake ==
The series was remade in Vietnam as Hành trình công lý, which aired on government-owned VTV3 on October 10th, 2022.
