= The Good Wife (Japanese TV series) =

Japanese drama television series

The Good Wife (グッドワイフ) is a Japanese television drama series starring Takako Tokiwa, Kotaro Koizumi, Kiko Mizuhara, Takumi Kitamura, and Kika Kobayashi. It is a Japanese remake of the American television series of the same title which aired on CBS from 2009 to 2016. It aired on TBS from January 13 to March 17, 2019, on Sundays at 21:00 hrs.
