= Amy Huberman =

Irish actress

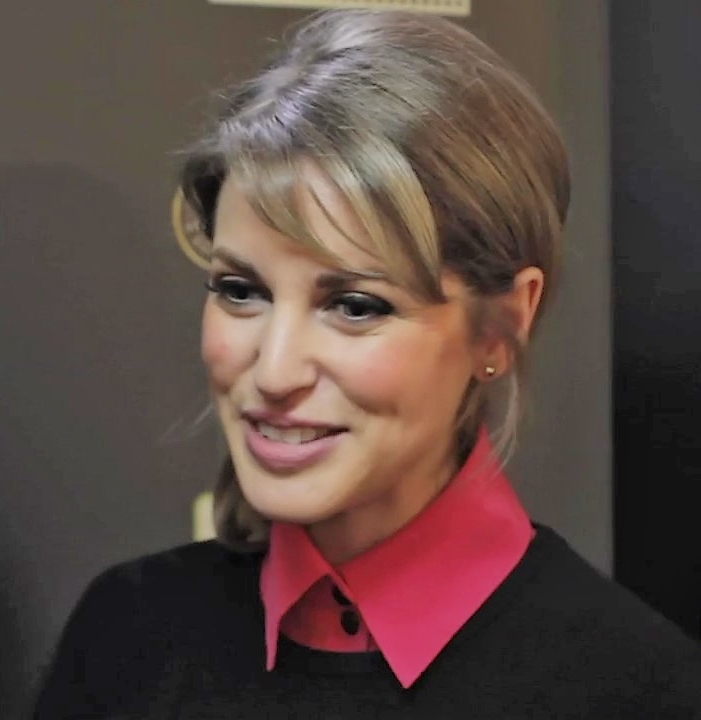
- Huberman in 2012
- Born: 28 March 1979 (age 47); Dublin, Ireland
- Occupations: Actress; writer
- Years active: 2001–present
- Spouse: Brian O'Driscoll (m. 2010)
- Children: 3

Amy Huberman (born 28 March 1979) is an Irish actress and writer. She is known for her role as Daisy in the RTÉ drama series The Clinic. In 2018, she began writing and starring in the comedy series Finding Joy.

== Early life ==
Huberman grew up in south Dublin. She is the middle child of three siblings and the only daughter. Her father Harold was born in London to a Polish Jewish family; her mother Sandra is from County Wexford. Her parents married in 1974. Her brother, Mark Huberman, is also an actor and worked in films such as Boy Eats Girl and on The Clinic as Kieran Miller.

She was educated at Loreto College, Foxrock and she took classes in the Betty Ann Norton Drama School. Following school, she attended University College Dublin (UCD) intending to become a social worker, but when she found the drama society her career took a different direction.

== Acting career ==
From 2003 to 2009, Huberman portrayed the role of Daisy on RTÉ's drama series The Clinic. Her film appearances include Satellites & Meteorites, and A Film with Me in It, both released in 2008.

== Writing ==
Huberman's debut novel, Hello Heartbreak (ISBN 978-1844882144), was published on 2 July 2009. In 2018, Huberman began writing and starring in the comedy series Finding Joy, as titular character Joy. To date, two series have been broadcast on RTÉ.

== Personal life ==
Huberman married former Ireland rugby captain Brian O'Driscoll in July 2010 in Lough Rynn Castle; the couple have three children.

In March 2025, she launched her own branded wine, Ah Wines.

== Filmography ==
Film
| Year | Title | Role | Notes |
|---|---|---|---|
| 2001 | Bad Karma | Jenny Pantelli | |
| 2005 | George | (unknown) | Short films |
| 2005 | English | (unknown) | Short films |
| 2007 | Deep Breaths | Bridget | Short films |
| 2007 | Shattered | Nicole Lawlor | |
| 2008 | A Film with Me in It | Sally | |
| 2008 | Satellites & Meteorites | Lucinda | |
| 2008 | Leno's Last Kiss | Lacey | Video |
| 2008 | Awareness | Sybil | Short film |
| 2009 | Assault of Darkness | Hannah Ross | Original title: Legend of the Bog |
| 2010 | Rewind | Karen | Won: IFTA for Best Actress in a Film |
| 2011 | Death of a Superhero | Nursey Worsey (voice) | |
| 2011 | Stella Days | Eileen | Nominated: IFTA for Best Supporting Actress in a Film |
| 2013 | The Stag | Ruth | |
| 2015 | Ghosthunters: On Icy Trails | Emily | |
| 2016 | Handsome Devil | Natalie Roche | |
| 2016 | Kill Ratio | Gabrielle Martin | |
| 2017 | Zoo | Emily Hall | |
| 2020 | A Cat Called Jam | Treacle | Short film |
| 2023 | Flora and Son | Aishling | |
| 2023 | Puffin Rock and the New Friends | Puffin Egg Mammy (voice) | |
| 2025 | Fran the Man | Jackie Charlton | |

Television
| Year | Title | Role | Notes |
|---|---|---|---|
| 2001–2002 | On Home Ground | Diane Collins | Series 1 & 2; 14 episodes |
| 2003–2009 | The Clinic | Daisy O'Callaghan | Series 1–7; 62 episodes. Nominated: IFTA for Best Supporting Actress in Television |
| 2005 | Showbands | Bella | Television films |
| 2006 | Showbands II | Bella | Television films |
| 2006 | Dream Team 80's | Ann Kavanagh | Mini-series; episodes 1–3 |
| 2007 | Inspector George Gently | Charlotte 'Charlie' Dawson | Pilot episode: "Gently Go Man" |
| 2010 | Your Bad Self | Various | Episodes 1–6 |
| 2010 | Comedy Lab | Various | Series 11; episode 1: "iCandy" |
| 2010 | Three Wise Women | Liz | Television film |
| 2011–2012 | Threesome | Alice | Main role. Series 1 & 2; 14 episodes |
| 2012 | Chasing Leprechauns | Sarah Cavanaugh | Television film (Hallmark) |
| 2012 | Immaturity for Charity | Various | Television special |
| 2013 | Heading Out | Julia | Episode 2 |
| 2014 | Moone Boy | Miss Tivnan | Series 2; episode 2: "Moon Dance" |
| 2015 | Silent Witness | Carol Mansfield | Series 18; episodes 5 & 6: "Protection" - Parts 1 & 2 |
| 2016 | Houdini & Doyle | Mrs. Anne Batch | Mini-series; episode 3: "In Manus Dei" |
| 2016 | Jason Byrne in Ireland | Helen | Television short film |
| 2016 | Fir Bolg | Bainisteoir Stáitse | Episode 4: "Scoilteanna" |
| 2016, 2017 | Cold Feet | Sarah Moore/Poynter | Series 6; episode 7, & series 7; episodes 1–7 |
| 2016–2018 | Can't Cope, Won't Cope | Kate | Series 1; episodes 1–3, 5 & 6, & series 2; episode 5 |
| 2017–2018 | Striking Out | Tara Rafferty | Series 1 & 2; 10 episodes |
| 2018 | Butterfly | Gemma | Main role. Mini-series; episodes 1–3 |
| 2018–2020 | Finding Joy | Joy | Main role. Series 1 & 2; 12 episodes. Also creator, writer, associate/executive producer |
| 2019 | Flack | Celina Pope | Series 1; episode 3: "Dan" |
| 2020 | HerStory: Animations | Máire Ní Chinnéide | Episode 5: "Máire Ní Chinnéide" |
| 2022 | Derry Girls | Tara | Series 3; episode 3: "Stranger on a Train" |
| 2022–2024 | Harry Wild | Orla Wild | Series 1–3; 14 episodes |
| 2024 | LOL: Last One Laughing Ireland | Herself - Contestant | Episodes 1–6 |
| 2024 | Storybud | Narrator | Series 4; episodes 2 & 4: "Katie McCabe" & "Margot Robbie" |
| 2025 | Small Town, Big Story | Showbiz Shirley | Episode 6: "The Turd Man" |
| 2025 | The Game | Liz Maguire | Mini-series; episodes 1–4 |
