= Robert and Michelle King =

American screenwriting duo

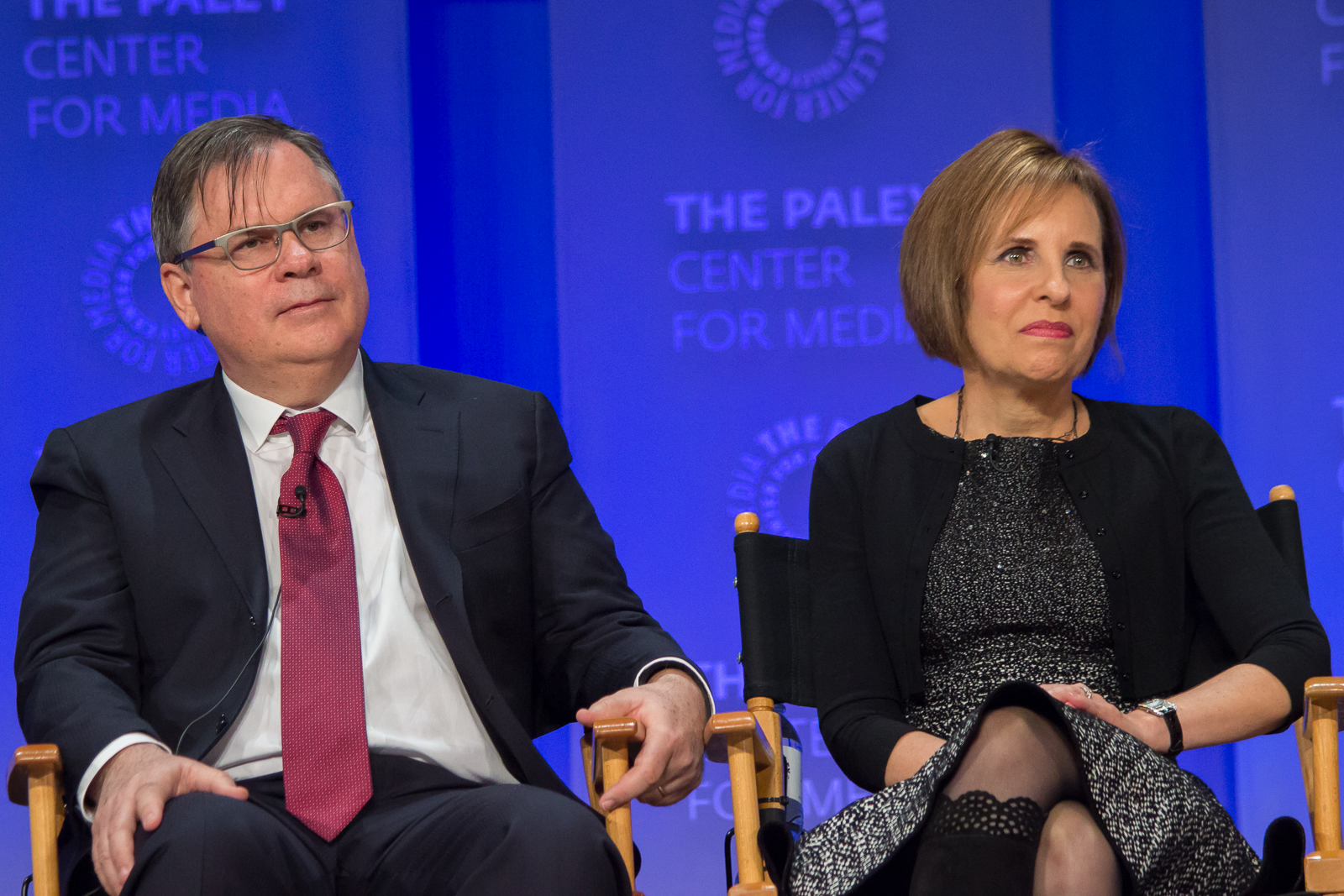
- Robert and Michelle King at the 2015 PaleyFest presentation for The Good Wife
- Occupations: Writer, producer
- Children: 1

Robert King (born 1959) and Michelle King (née Stern; born 1962) are an American television writing and producing duo. The two are best known as the creators and showrunners of the legal drama series The Good Wife (2009–16), its spin-offs The Good Fight (2017–22) and Elsbeth (2024–present), and the supernatural drama Evil (2019–24). The two are also the founders of their own production company, King Size Productions. Prior to his television work with his wife, King had worked extensively as a film screenwriter for a wide variety of genres.

== Personal life ==
Robert attended Archbishop Mitty High School and Westmont College. Robert is of Irish and Italian descent.

Robert King and Michelle Stern met in 1983 when as a senior at UCLA she worked part-time at FrontRunners athletic shoe store. The couple married in 1987. They have one daughter, Sophia. A Catholic, he often attends Mass with The Good Fight lead actress Christine Baranski.

== Career ==
Robert began his career writing the science fiction horror film The Nest (1988), and co-wrote Phantom of the Mall: Eric's Revenge, Under the Boardwalk and Bloodfist (all 1989). Robert continued to write feature films throughout the 1990s, including Clean Slate, Speechless, Cutthroat Island and Red Corner. He directed the comedy film Principal Takes a Holiday in 1998. He co-wrote and directed Angels in the Infield (2000). He co-wrote and produced Vertical Limit.

Robert and Michelle King co-created and co-produced the short-lived drama series In Justice in 2006. They co-created a second, far more successful, legal drama series, The Good Wife, which ran for seven seasons from 2009 to 2016 on CBS. Aside from the pilot episode, they co-wrote the episodes "Stripped", "Unorthodox", "Hi", and twelve other episodes.

Robert and Michelle King also created and produced the comedy thriller drama series BrainDead, which aired on CBS on June 13, 2016, through October 17, 2016 before it was cancelled. The couple then returned to their The Good Wife spin-off The Good Fight as showrunners. More recently, the King Size Productions company signed an overall deal with CBS Studios.

Their first horror series Evil began airing on CBS on September 26, 2019. After one season, the series moved to Paramount +, and ended on its fourth season.

Their second horror series The Bite premiered on May 21, 2021, on Spectrum Originals.

The Kings co-created another Good Wife spin-off, Elsbeth, which premiered on CBS on February 29, 2024.

Their latest work is Cupertino, which premiered on CBS on October 8, 2026.

== Filmography ==
Film writer (Note: Robert only)

- The Nest (1988)
- Under the Boardwalk (1989)
- Bloodfist (1989)
- Phantom of the Mall: Eric's Revenge (1989)
- Silk 2 (1989)
- Clean Slate (1994)
- Speechless (1994)
- Cutthroat Island (1995)
- Red Corner (1997)
- Vertical Limit (2000) (also producer)

TV movies

Year	Title	Director	Writer
1998	Principal Takes a Holiday	Yes	Yes
2000	Angels in the Infield	Yes	Yes

TV series

Year	Title	Director	Writer	Executive Producer	Creator
2006	In Justice	No	Yes	Yes	Yes
2009–2016	The Good Wife	Yes	Yes	Yes	Yes
2016	BrainDead	Yes	Yes	Yes	Yes
2017–2022	The Good Fight	Yes	Yes	Yes	Yes
2019–2024	Evil	Yes	Yes	Yes	Yes
2020–2023	Your Honor	No	No	Yes	No
2021	The Bite	No	Yes	Yes	Yes
2024–present	Elsbeth	Yes	Yes	Yes	Yes
2025	Happy Face	No	No	Yes	No
2026–present	Cupertino	Yes	Yes	Yes	Yes

== Awards and nominations ==
Robert, Michelle and the writing staff have been nominated for a Writers Guild of America Award for Best New Series for The Good Wife.
