= List of The Good Wife episodes =

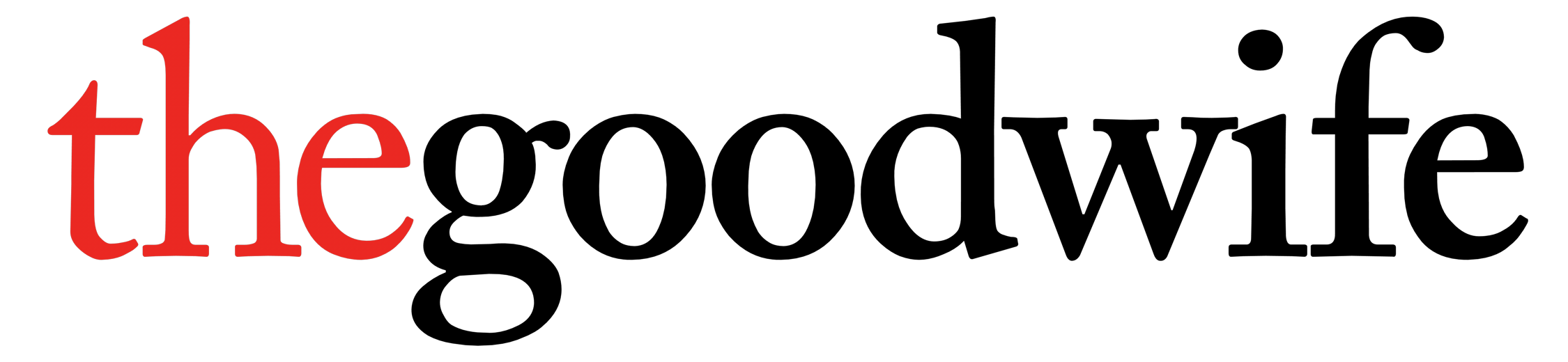

The Good Wife is a legal drama television series set in Chicago, created by Robert King and Michelle King. The series premiered on CBS on September 22, 2009. The show tells the story of Alicia Florrick (Julianna Margulies), whose husband Peter (Chris Noth) has been jailed following a very public sex and corruption scandal. She returns to her old job as a defense attorney under Will Gardner and Diane Lockhart (Josh Charles and Christine Baranski) to rebuild her reputation and provide for her two children, Zach and Grace (Graham Phillips and Makenzie Vega).

From the first to the fourth season, all episode titles have the same number of words as the number of the season in which they appear; that is, all season one episodes have one-word titles, all season two episodes have two-word titles, etc. Starting with the fifth season, the number of words starts to decrease; the idea of the creators was that – ratings permitting – the show would run for seven seasons, which would allow for a symmetry in the title lengths: 1–2–3–4–3–2–1 to count words in each season's titles, respectively.

On May 11, 2015, CBS renewed the series for a seventh season. It was announced in a commercial that aired during Super Bowl 50 that the seventh season would be the final season of The Good Wife. During the course of the series, 156 episodes of The Good Wife aired over seven seasons, between September 22, 2009, and May 8, 2016.

== Series overview ==
Season	Episodes	Originally released		Rank	Average viewership (in millions)
Season	Episodes	First released	Last released	Rank	Average viewership (in millions)
1	23	September 22, 2009	May 25, 2010	18	13.12
2	23	September 28, 2010	May 17, 2011	16	13.00
3	22	September 25, 2011	April 29, 2012	26	11.83
4	22	September 30, 2012	April 28, 2013	27	10.98
5	22	September 29, 2013	May 18, 2014	23	11.43
6	22	September 21, 2014	May 10, 2015	22	12.17
7	22	October 4, 2015	May 8, 2016	27	10.84

== Episodes ==
=== Season 1 (2009–10) ===
No. overall	No. in season	Title	Directed by	Written by	Original release date	US viewers (millions)
1	1	"Pilot"	Charles McDougall	Robert King & Michelle King	September 22, 2009	13.71
2	2	"Stripped"	Charles McDougall	Robert King & Michelle King	September 29, 2009	13.69
3	3	"Home"	Scott Ellis	Dee Johnson	October 6, 2009	13.69
4	4	"Fixed"	Daniel Minahan	Todd Ellis Kessler	October 13, 2009	12.98
5	5	"Crash"	Gloria Muzio	Ted Humphrey	October 20, 2009	13.26
6	6	"Conjugal"	Rod Holcomb	Angela Amato Velez	November 3, 2009	12.74
7	7	"Unorthodox"	John Polson	Robert King & Michelle King	November 10, 2009	13.35
8	8	"Unprepared"	Jim McKay	Corinne Brinkerhoff	November 17, 2009	12.70
9	9	"Threesome"	James Whitmore Jr.	Ted Humphrey	November 24, 2009	12.53
10	10	"Lifeguard"	Paris Barclay	Tom Smuts	December 15, 2009	14.17
11	11	"Infamy"	Nelson McCormick	Todd Ellis Kessler	January 5, 2010	13.98
12	12	"Painkiller"	Steve Shill	Corinne Brinkerhoff	January 12, 2010	13.87
13	13	"Bad"	Alex Zakrzewski	Ted Humphrey	February 2, 2010	12.72
14	14	"Hi"	John Gallagher	Robert King & Michelle King & Barry Schkolnick	February 9, 2010	14.75
15	15	"Bang"	Rod Holcomb	Courtney Kemp Agboh	March 2, 2010	13.29
16	16	"Fleas"	Rosemary Rodriguez	Amanda Segel	March 9, 2010	13.91
17	17	"Heart"	Félix Alcalá	Corinne Brinkerhoff	March 16, 2010	13.41
18	18	"Doubt"	Félix Alcalá	Robert King & Michelle King & Barry Schkolnick	April 6, 2010	12.06
19	19	"Boom"	Lesli Linka Glatter	Ted Humphrey	April 27, 2010	12.07
20	20	"Mock"	Rod Holcomb	Todd Ellis Kessler	May 4, 2010	12.88
21	21	"Unplugged"	Christopher Misiano	Karen Hall	May 11, 2010	12.85
22	22	"Hybristophilia"	Frederick E. O. Toye	Frank Pierson	May 18, 2010	12.17
23	23	"Running"	James Whitmore Jr.	Robert King & Michelle King & Corinne Brinkerhoff	May 25, 2010	10.58

=== Season 2 (2010–11) ===
No. overall	No. in season	Title	Directed by	Written by	Original release date	US viewers (millions)
24	1	"Taking Control"	Félix Alcalá	Robert King & Michelle King	September 28, 2010	12.84
25	2	"Double Jeopardy"	Dean Parisot	Ted Humphrey	October 5, 2010	12.76
26	3	"Breaking Fast"	James Whitmore Jr.	Corinne Brinkerhoff	October 12, 2010	11.82
27	4	"Cleaning House"	Rosemary Rodriguez	Robert King & Michelle King	October 19, 2010	12.17
28	5	"VIP Treatment"	Michael Zinberg	Robert King & Michelle King	October 26, 2010	12.59
29	6	"Poisoned Pill"	Peter O'Fallon	Keith Eisner	November 9, 2010	12.33
30	7	"Bad Girls"	Jim McKay	Courtney Kemp Agboh	November 16, 2010	11.74
31	8	"On Tap"	Roxann Dawson	Leonard Dick	November 23, 2010	10.03
32	9	"Nine Hours"	Julie Hébert	Meredith Averill	December 14, 2010	11.84
33	10	"Breaking Up"	Félix Alcalá	Courtney Kemp Agboh	January 11, 2011	12.29
34	11	"Two Courts"	Tom DiCillo	Ted Humphrey	January 18, 2011	11.43
35	12	"Silly Season"	Rosemary Rodriguez	Corinne Brinkerhoff	February 1, 2011	12.14
36	13	"Real Deal"	Michael Zinberg	Keith Eisner	February 8, 2011	11.86
37	14	"Net Worth"	Brooke Kennedy	Meredith Averill	February 15, 2011	11.43
38	15	"Silver Bullet"	Jim McKay	Steve Lichtman	February 22, 2011	11.86
39	16	"Great Firewall"	Nelson McCormick	Leonard Dick	March 1, 2011	11.38
40	17	"Ham Sandwich"	Griffin Dunne	Keith Eisner	March 22, 2011	11.70
41	18	"Killer Song"	James Whitmore Jr.	Karen Hall	March 29, 2011	10.16
42	19	"Wrongful Termination"	Phil Abraham	Ted Humphrey	April 5, 2011	10.82
43	20	"Foreign Affairs"	Frederick E.O. Toye	Meredith Averill	April 12, 2011	11.05
44	21	"In Sickness"	Félix Alcalá	Story by : Steve Lichtman; Teleplay by : Robert King & Michelle King	May 3, 2011	12.38
45	22	"Getting Off"	Roxann Dawson	Leonard Dick	May 10, 2011	11.73
46	23	"Closing Arguments"	Robert King	Corinne Brinkerhoff	May 17, 2011	12.58

=== Season 3 (2011–12) ===
No. overall	No. in season	Title	Directed by	Written by	Original release date	US viewers (millions)
47	1	"A New Day"	Brooke Kennedy	Story by : Meredith Averill; Teleplay by : Robert King & Michelle King	September 25, 2011	10.66
48	2	"The Death Zone"	Jim McKay	Story by : Leonard Dick; Teleplay by : Robert King & Michelle King	October 2, 2011	11.08
49	3	"Get a Room"	David Platt	Story by : Julia Wolfe; Teleplay by : Robert King & Michelle King	October 9, 2011	10.28
50	4	"Feeding the Rat"	Frederick E.O. Toye	Keith Eisner	October 16, 2011	10.33
51	5	"Marthas and Caitlins"	Félix Alcalá	Ted Humphrey	October 23, 2011	9.77
52	6	"Affairs of State"	Dean Parisot	Corinne Brinkerhoff	October 30, 2011	10.60
53	7	"Executive Order 13224"	Brooke Kennedy	Leonard Dick	November 6, 2011	9.07
54	8	"Death Row Tip"	Joshua Marston	Story by : Matthew Montoya; Teleplay by : Robert King & Michelle King	November 13, 2011	10.24
55	9	"Whiskey Tango Foxtrot"	Rosemary Rodriguez	Robert King & Michelle King & Meredith Averill	November 20, 2011	9.79
56	10	"Parenting Made Easy"	Rosemary Rodriguez	Story by : Courtney Kemp Agboh; Teleplay by : Robert King & Michelle King	December 4, 2011	9.94
57	11	"What Went Wrong"	James Whitmore Jr.	Story by : Keith Eisner; Teleplay by : Robert King & Michelle King	December 11, 2011	11.56
58	12	"Alienation of Affection"	Michael Zinberg	Robert King & Michelle King & Corinne Brinkerhoff	January 8, 2012	11.65
59	13	"Bitcoin for Dummies"	Frederick E. O. Toye	Story by : Courtney Kemp Agboh; Teleplay by : Robert King & Michelle King	January 15, 2012	9.45
60	14	"Another Ham Sandwich"	Frederick E.O. Toye	Leonard Dick	January 29, 2012	11.08
61	15	"Live from Damascus"	Brooke Kennedy	Story by : Ted Humphrey; Teleplay by : Robert King & Michelle King & Leonard Dick	February 19, 2012	9.73
62	16	"After the Fall"	James Whitmore Jr.	Meredith Averill	March 4, 2012	9.83
63	17	"Long Way Home"	Nelson McCormick	Keith Eisner	March 11, 2012	9.88
64	18	"Gloves Come Off"	Michael Zinberg	Story by : Matthew Montoya; Teleplay by : Leonard Dick	March 18, 2012	9.58
65	19	"Blue Ribbon Panel"	Rosemary Rodriguez	Story by : Courtney Kemp Agboh; Teleplay by : Robert King & Michelle King	March 25, 2012	9.77
66	20	"Pants on Fire"	Roxann Dawson	Ted Humphrey	April 15, 2012	10.16
67	21	"The Penalty Box"	Michael Zinberg	Story by : Julia Wolfe; Teleplay by : Robert King & Michelle King & Ted Humphrey	April 22, 2012	10.42
68	22	"The Dream Team"	Robert King	Corinne Brinkerhoff & Meredith Averill	April 29, 2012	9.97

=== Season 4 (2012–13) ===
No. overall	No. in season	Title	Directed by	Written by	Original release date	US viewers (millions)
69	1	"I Fought the Law"	Michael Zinberg	Robert King & Michelle King	September 30, 2012	9.93
70	2	"And the Law Won"	Rosemary Rodriguez	Ted Humphrey	October 7, 2012	8.95
71	3	"Two Girls, One Code"	Brooke Kennedy	Robert King & Michelle King	October 14, 2012	9.12
72	4	"Don't Haze Me, Bro"	Michael Zinberg	Keith Eisner	October 21, 2012	10.02
73	5	"Waiting for the Knock"	Frederick E.O. Toye	Leonard Dick	October 28, 2012	9.51
74	6	"The Art of War"	Josh Charles	Robert King & Michelle King & Ted Humphrey	November 4, 2012	9.93
75	7	"Anatomy of a Joke"	James Whitmore Jr.	Craig Turk & Robert King & Michelle King	November 11, 2012	9.02
76	8	"Here Comes the Judge"	Rosemary Rodriguez	Meredith Averill	November 18, 2012	9.94
77	9	"A Defense of Marriage"	Brooke Kennedy	Story by : Matthew Montoya; Teleplay by : Robert King & Michelle King	November 25, 2012	9.45
78	10	"Battle of the Proxies"	Griffin Dunne	Ted Humphrey	December 2, 2012	9.70
79	11	"Boom De Yah Da"	Félix Alcalá	Nichelle Tramble Spellman	January 6, 2013	9.96
80	12	"Je Ne Sais What?"	Matt Shakman	Jacqueline Hoyt	January 13, 2013	10.04
81	13	"The Seven Day Rule"	Michael Zinberg	Keith Eisner	January 27, 2013	9.35
82	14	"Red Team, Blue Team"	Jim McKay	Robert King & Michelle King	February 17, 2013	8.35
83	15	"Going for the Gold"	Rosemary Rodriguez	Leonard Dick	March 3, 2013	8.99
84	16	"Runnin' with the Devil"	Christopher Misiano	Meredith Averill	March 10, 2013	9.21
85	17	"Invitation to an Inquest"	Kevin Hooks	Story by : Julia Wolfe; Teleplay by : Julia Wolfe & Matthew Montoya	March 17, 2013	9.08
86	18	"Death of a Client"	Robert King	Robert King & Michelle King	March 24, 2013	9.59
87	19	"The Wheels of Justice"	Frederick E.O. Toye	Jacqueline Hoyt	March 31, 2013	8.59
88	20	"Rape: A Modern Perspective"	Brooke Kennedy	J. C. Nolan	April 14, 2013	10.14
89	21	"A More Perfect Union"	Michael Zinberg	Craig Turk	April 21, 2013	9.02
90	22	"What's in the Box?"	Robert King	Robert King & Michelle King	April 28, 2013	9.13

=== Season 5 (2013–14) ===
No. overall	No. in season	Title	Directed by	Written by	Original release date	US viewers (millions)
91	1	"Everything Is Ending"	Robert King	Robert King & Michelle King	September 29, 2013	9.15
92	2	"The Bit Bucket"	Michael Zinberg	Ted Humphrey & Robert King	October 6, 2013	9.23
93	3	"A Precious Commodity"	Brooke Kennedy	Keith Eisner	October 13, 2013	8.46
94	4	"Outside the Bubble"	Félix Alcalá	Robert King & Michelle King	October 20, 2013	8.99
95	5	"Hitting the Fan"	James Whitmore Jr.	Robert King & Michelle King	October 27, 2013	9.35
96	6	"The Next Day"	Michael Zinberg	Leonard Dick	November 3, 2013	10.22
97	7	"The Next Week"	Frederick E.O. Toye	Craig Turk	November 10, 2013	10.26
98	8	"The Next Month"	Josh Charles	Ted Humphrey	November 17, 2013	9.72
99	9	"Whack-a-Mole"	Kevin Hooks	Nichelle Tramble Spellman	November 24, 2013	9.70
100	10	"The Decision Tree"	Rosemary Rodriguez	Robert King & Michelle King	December 1, 2013	10.42
101	11	"Goliath and David"	Brooke Kennedy	Luke Schelhaas	January 5, 2014	9.24
102	12	"We, the Juries"	Paris Barclay	Keith Eisner	January 12, 2014	9.85
103	13	"Parallel Construction, Bitches"	Matt Shakman	Erica Shelton Kodish	March 9, 2014	8.94
104	14	"A Few Words"	Rosemary Rodriguez	Leonard Dick	March 16, 2014	8.43
105	15	"Dramatics, Your Honor"	Brooke Kennedy	Robert King & Michelle King	March 23, 2014	9.12
106	16	"The Last Call"	Jim McKay	Robert King & Michelle King	March 30, 2014	10.96
107	17	"A Material World"	Griffin Dunne	Craig Turk	April 13, 2014	9.83
108	18	"All Tapped Out"	Félix Alcalá	Julia Wolfe & Matthew Montoya	April 20, 2014	9.15
109	19	"Tying the Knot"	Josh Charles	Nichelle Tramble Spellman	April 27, 2014	9.33
110	20	"The Deep Web"	Brooke Kennedy	Luke Schelhaas & Erica Shelton Kodish	May 4, 2014	8.98
111	21	"The One Percent"	Rosemary Rodriguez	Ted Humphrey	May 11, 2014	8.73
112	22	"A Weird Year"	Robert King	Robert King & Michelle King	May 18, 2014	9.14

=== Season 6 (2014–15) ===
No. overall	No. in season	Title	Directed by	Written by	Original release date	US viewers (millions)
113	1	"The Line"	Robert King	Robert King & Michelle King	September 21, 2014	11.06
114	2	"Trust Issues"	Jim McKay	Ted Humphrey	September 28, 2014	11.09
115	3	"Dear God"	Brooke Kennedy	Luke Schelhaas	October 5, 2014	10.83
116	4	"Oppo Research"	Matt Shakman	Robert King & Michelle King	October 12, 2014	10.39
117	5	"Shiny Objects"	Frederick E.O. Toye	Keith Eisner	October 19, 2014	10.88
118	6	"Old Spice"	James Whitmore Jr.	Leonard Dick	October 26, 2014	10.21
119	7	"Message Discipline"	Matt Shakman	Craig Turk	November 2, 2014	10.45
120	8	"Red Zone"	Félix Alcalá	Nichelle Tramble Spellman	November 9, 2014	10.72
121	9	"Sticky Content"	Michael Zinberg	Robert King & Michelle King	November 16, 2014	10.55
122	10	"The Trial"	Frederick E.O. Toye	Robert King & Michelle King	November 23, 2014	10.26
123	11	"Hail Mary"	Rosemary Rodriguez	Erica Shelton Kodish	January 4, 2015	10.36
124	12	"The Debate"	Brooke Kennedy	Robert King & Michelle King	January 11, 2015	9.58
125	13	"Dark Money"	Jim McKay	Keith Eisner	March 1, 2015	9.09
126	14	"Mind's Eye"	Robert King	Robert King & Michelle King	March 8, 2015	9.09
127	15	"Open Source"	Rosemary Rodriguez	Craig Turk	March 15, 2015	8.85
128	16	"Red Meat"	Michael Zinberg	Nichelle Tramble Spellman	March 22, 2015	8.43
129	17	"Undisclosed Recipients"	James Whitmore Jr.	Leonard Dick	March 29, 2015	8.88
130	18	"Loser Edit"	Brooke Kennedy	Luke Schelhaas	April 5, 2015	7.83
131	19	"Winning Ugly"	Rosemary Rodriguez	Erica Shelton Kodish	April 12, 2015	8.75
132	20	"The Deconstruction"	Ted Humphrey	Ted Humphrey	April 26, 2015	8.74
133	21	"Don't Fail"	Nelson McCormick	Robert King & Michelle King	May 3, 2015	8.35
134	22	"Wanna Partner?"	Robert King	Robert King & Michelle King	May 10, 2015	9.35

=== Season 7 (2015–16) ===
No. overall	No. in season	Title	Directed by	Written by	Original release date	US viewers (millions)
135	1	"Bond"	Brooke Kennedy	Robert King & Michelle King	October 4, 2015	9.25
136	2	"Innocents"	Jim McKay	Craig Turk	October 11, 2015	8.82
137	3	"Cooked"	Michael Zinberg	Luke Schelhaas	October 18, 2015	8.09
138	4	"Taxed"	Jim McKay	Leonard Dick	October 25, 2015	8.82
139	5	"Payback"	Craig Zisk	Stephanie Sengupta	November 1, 2015	7.55
140	6	"Lies"	James Whitmore Jr.	Erica Shelton Kodish	November 8, 2015	8.27
141	7	"Driven"	David Dworetzky	Tyler Bensinger	November 15, 2015	8.52
142	8	"Restraint"	Matt Shakman	Adam R. Perlman	November 22, 2015	7.81
143	9	"Discovery"	Rosemary Rodriguez	Joey Scavuzzo & Aaron Slavick	November 29, 2015	7.94
144	10	"KSR"	Jim McKay	Craig Turk	December 13, 2015	8.49
145	11	"Iowa"	Matt Shakman	Erica Shelton Kodish	January 10, 2016	7.65
146	12	"Tracks"	Félix Alcalá	Stephanie Sengupta	January 17, 2016	8.96
147	13	"Judged"	Rosemary Rodriguez	Tyler Bensinger	January 31, 2016	8.03
148	14	"Monday"	Nelson McCormick	Leonard Dick	February 14, 2016	7.96
149	15	"Targets"	David Dworetzky	Luke Schelhaas	February 21, 2016	7.91
150	16	"Hearing"	Félix Alcalá	Adam R. Perlman	March 6, 2016	7.27
151	17	"Shoot"	Frederick E.O. Toye	Stephanie Sengupta	March 20, 2016	8.08
152	18	"Unmanned"	James Whitmore Jr.	Tyler Bensinger	March 27, 2016	7.51
153	19	"Landing"	Phil Alden Robinson	Luke Schelhaas	April 17, 2016	8.55
154	20	"Party"	Rosemary Rodriguez	Leonard Dick	April 24, 2016	8.49
155	21	"Verdict"	Michael Zinberg	Craig Turk	May 1, 2016	9.19
156	22	"End"	Robert King	Robert King & Michelle King	May 8, 2016	10.62

== Home video releases ==
Season	Episodes	DVD release dates			
Season	Episodes	Region 1	Region 2	Region 4	Discs
1	23	September 14, 2010	September 20, 2010	August 31, 2010	6
2	23	September 13, 2011	September 12, 2011	October 6, 2011	6
3	22	September 4, 2012	August 27, 2012	August 29, 2012	6
4	22	August 20, 2013	September 2, 2013	September 18, 2013	6
5	22	August 19, 2014	September 15, 2014	September 17, 2014	6
6	22	August 25, 2015	September 14, 2015	September 16, 2015	6
7	22	September 20, 2016	October 31, 2016	October 5, 2016	6
