= List of awards and nominations received by Julianna Margulies =

Julianna Margulies awards and nominations
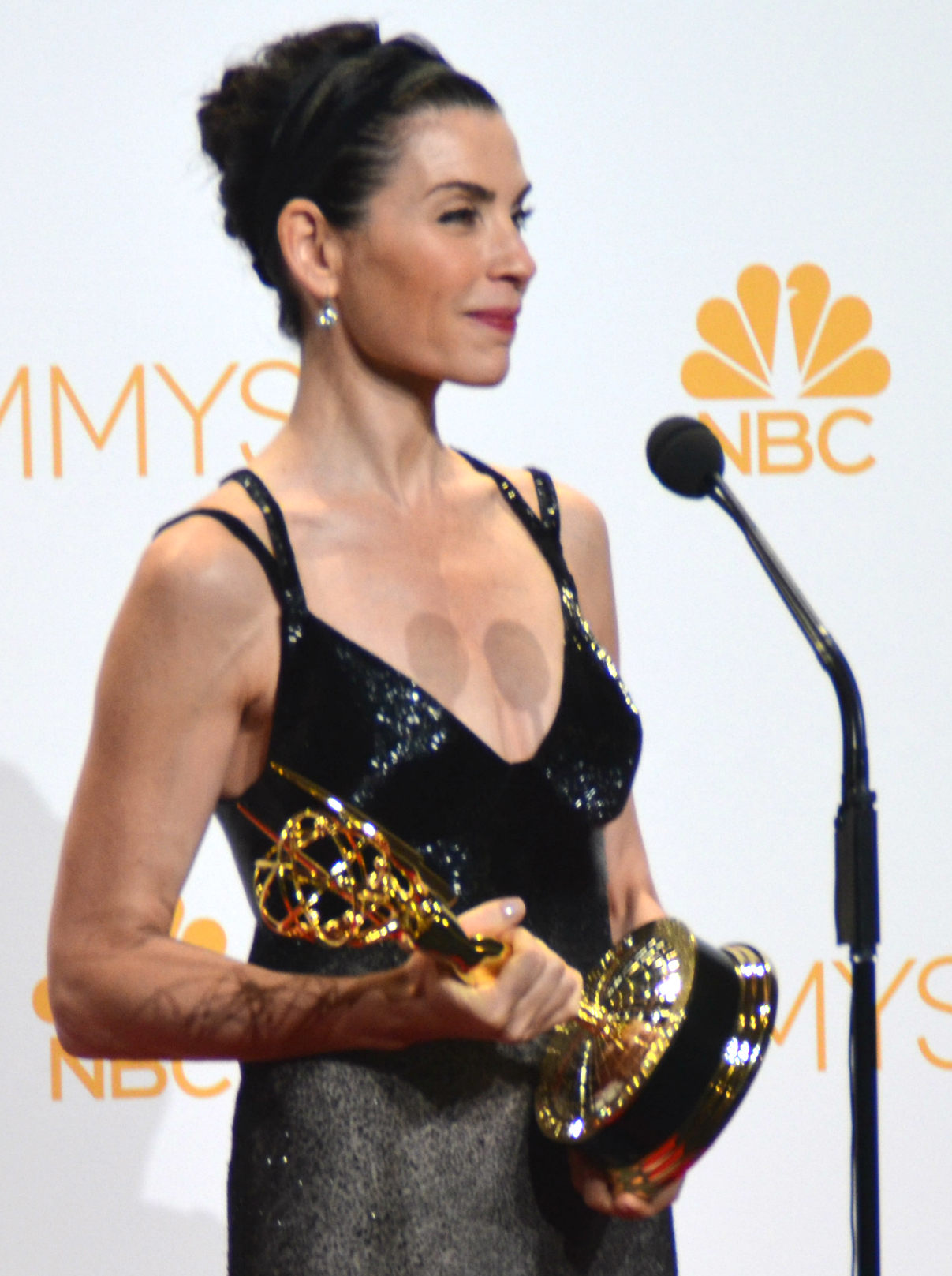
- Margulies, after her win, at the 66th Primetime Emmy Awards on August 25, 2014
Totals
Award	Wins	Nominations
Critics' Choice Television Awards	1	5
Dorian Awards	0	2
Golden Globe Awards	1	12
Golden Nymph Awards	0	1
Online Film & Television Association Awards	2	4
People's Choice Awards	0	2
Primetime Emmy Awards	3	10
Screen Actors Guild Awards	8	21
Satellite Awards	0	7
Viewers for Quality Television Awards	2	4
Wins	17
Nominations	67

This article is a List of awards and nominations received by Julianna Margulies.

American actress Julianna Margulies has been widely recognized for her roles in television. Over her career she has received three Primetime Emmy Awards, one Golden Globe Award, eight Screen Actors Guild Awards, one Critics' Choice Television Award, and one TCA Award.

She received the Primetime Emmy Award for Outstanding Supporting Actress in a Drama Series in 1995 for her role as nurse manager Carol Hathaway in the NBC medical drama series ER (1994–2000). She also earned two Primetime Emmy Award for Outstanding Lead Actress in a Drama Series for her portrayal of legal attorney Alicia Florrick in the CBS legal drama series The Good Wife (2009–2016).

== Major associations ==
=== Emmy Awards ===
Primetime Emmy Awards
Year	Category	Nominated work	Result	Ref.
1995	Outstanding Supporting Actress in a Drama Series	ER (episode: "Sleepless in Chicago" + "Make of Two Hearts")	Won	
1996	Outstanding Supporting Actress in a Drama Series	ER (episode: "Home" + "The Healers")	Nominated	
1997	Outstanding Lead Actress in a Drama Series	ER (episode: "The Long Way Around")	Nominated	
1998	Outstanding Lead Actress in a Drama Series	ER (episode: "Carter's Choice")	Nominated	
1999	Outstanding Lead Actress in a Drama Series	ER (episode: "The Storm, Part II")	Nominated	
2000	Outstanding Lead Actress in a Drama Series	ER (episode: "Great Expectations")	Nominated	
2010	Outstanding Lead Actress in a Drama Series	The Good Wife (episode: "Threesome")	Nominated	
2011	Outstanding Lead Actress in a Drama Series	The Good Wife (episode: "In Sickness")	Won	
2012	Outstanding Lead Actress in a Drama Series	The Good Wife (episode: "Parenting Made Easy")	Nominated	
2014	Outstanding Lead Actress in a Drama Series	The Good Wife (episode: "The Last Call")	Won	

=== Golden Globes Awards ===
Year	Category	Nominated work	Result	Ref.
1995	Best Supporting Actress – Television	ER	Nominated	
1997	Best Actress – Television Series Drama	ER	Nominated	
1998	Best Actress – Television Series Drama	ER	Nominated	
1999	Best Actress – Television Series Drama	ER	Nominated	
2001	Best Actress – Miniseries or Television Film	The Mists of Avalon	Nominated	
2004	Best Actress – Miniseries or Television Film	The Grid	Nominated	
2009	Best Actress – Television Series Drama	The Good Wife	Won	
2010	Best Actress – Television Series Drama	The Good Wife	Nominated	
2011	Best Actress – Television Series Drama	The Good Wife	Nominated	
2012	Best Actress – Television Series Drama	The Good Wife	Nominated	
2013	Best Actress – Television Series Drama	The Good Wife	Nominated	
2014	Best Actress – Television Series Drama	The Good Wife	Nominated	

=== Screen Actors Guild Awards ===
Year	Category	Nominated work	Result	Ref.
1994	Outstanding Ensemble in a Drama Series	ER (season 1)	Nominated	
1995	Outstanding Female Actor in a Drama Series	ER (season 2)	Nominated	
1995	Outstanding Ensemble in a Drama Series	ER (season 2)	Won	
1996	Outstanding Ensemble in a Drama Series	ER (season 3)	Won	
1997	Outstanding Ensemble in a Drama Series	ER (season 4)	Won	
1997	Outstanding Female Actor in a Drama Series	ER (season 4)	Won	
1998	Outstanding Female Actor in a Drama Series	ER (season 5)	Won	
1998	Outstanding Ensemble in a Drama Series	ER (season 5)	Won	
1999	Outstanding Ensemble in a Drama Series	ER (season 6)	Nominated	
2009	Outstanding Ensemble in a Drama Series	The Good Wife (season 1)	Nominated	
2009	Outstanding Female Actor in a Drama Series	The Good Wife (season 1)	Won	
2010	Outstanding Female Actor in a Drama Series	The Good Wife (season 2)	Won	
2010	Outstanding Ensemble in a Drama Series	The Good Wife (season 2)	Nominated	
2011	Outstanding Ensemble in a Drama Series	The Good Wife (season 3)	Nominated	
2011	Outstanding Female Actor in a Drama Series	The Good Wife (season 3)	Nominated	
2012	Outstanding Female Actor in a Drama Series	The Good Wife (season 4)	Nominated	
2014	Outstanding Female Actor in a Drama Series	The Good Wife (season 5)	Nominated	
2015	Outstanding Female Actor in a Drama Series	The Good Wife (season 6)	Nominated	
2021	Outstanding Ensemble in a Drama Series	The Morning Show (season 2)	Nominated	
2023	Outstanding Ensemble in a Drama Series	The Morning Show (season 3)	Nominated	

== Miscellaneous awards ==
=== Critics' Choice Television Awards ===
Year	Category	Nominated work	Result	Ref.
2011	Best Actress in a Drama Series	The Good Wife	Won	
2012	Best Actress in a Drama Series	The Good Wife	Nominated	
2013	Best Actress in a Drama Series	The Good Wife	Nominated	
2014	Best Actress in a Drama Series	The Good Wife	Nominated	
2015	Best Actress in a Drama Series	The Good Wife	Nominated	

=== Dorian Awards ===
Year	Category	Nominated work	Result	Ref.
2011	TV Performance of the Year – Actress	The Good Wife	Nominated	
2015	TV Performance of the Year – Actress	The Good Wife	Nominated	

=== Monte-Carlo Television Festival ===
Year	Category	Nominated work	Result	Ref.
2011	Outstanding Actress in a Drama Series	The Good Wife	Nominated	

=== Online Film & Television Association Awards ===
Year	Category	Nominated work	Result	Ref.
2010	Best Actress in a Drama Series	The Good Wife	Won	
2011	Best Actress in a Drama Series	The Good Wife	Won	
2012	Best Actress in a Drama Series	The Good Wife	Nominated	
2014	Best Actress in a Drama Series	The Good Wife	Nominated	

=== People's Choice Awards ===
Year	Category	Nominated work	Result	Ref.
2011	Favorite Dramatic TV Actress	The Good Wife	Nominated	
2014	Favorite Dramatic TV Actress	The Good Wife	Nominated	

=== Satellite Awards ===
Year	Category	Nominated work	Result	Ref.
1997	Best Actress – Television Series Drama	ER	Nominated	
1998	Best Actress – Television Series Drama	ER	Nominated	
2009	Best Actress – Television Series Drama	The Good Wife	Nominated	
2010	Best Actress – Television Series Drama	The Good Wife	Nominated	
2011	Best Actress – Television Series Drama	The Good Wife	Nominated	
2012	Best Actress – Television Series Drama	The Good Wife	Nominated	
2014	Best Actress – Television Series Drama	The Good Wife	Nominated	

=== Television Critics Association Awards ===
Year	Category	Nominated work	Result	Ref.
2010	Individual Achievement in Drama	The Good Wife	Won	
2011	Individual Achievement in Drama	The Good Wife	Nominated	
2014	Individual Achievement in Drama	The Good Wife	Nominated	

=== Viewers for Quality Television Awards ===
Year	Category	Nominated work	Result	Ref.
1995	Best Supporting Actress in a Quality Drama Series	ER	Won	
1997	Best Actress in a Quality Drama Series	ER	Won	
1998	Best Actress in a Quality Drama Series	ER	Nominated	
2000	Best Actress in a Quality Drama Series	ER	Nominated	
