= Fleas (The Good Wife) =

- The Good Wife episode
- Alicia (Julianna Margulies) and Eli Gold (Alan Cumming), who guest starred as a political operative modeled after Rahm Emanuel.
- Episode no.: Season 1 Episode 16
- Directed by: Rosemary Rodriguez
- Written by: Amanda Segel
- Original air date: March 9, 2010

Guest appearances
- Sharif Atkins as Harrison Rivers; Mike Colter as Lemond Bishop; Alan Cumming as Eli Gold; Ana Gasteyer as Judge Patrice Lessner; Katie Kreisler as Tammy Dorfman; Boris McGiver as Eric Dorfman; Dreama Walker as Becca

Episode chronology
← Previous "Bang"	Next → "Heart"
- The Good Wife (season 1)

"Fleas" is the sixteenth episode of the first season of the American legal drama television series The Good Wife. It aired on CBS in the United States on March 9, 2010. In the episode, the firm defends an attorney charged with murder for allegedly providing a witness list to his drug dealer client, which resulted in the death of a federal witness. Meanwhile, Peter grows jealous of Alicia's relationship with Will, and an anonymous Twitter user is making disparaging posts about Alicia.

The episode was written by Amanda Segel and directed by Rosemary Rodriguez. It marked the second in a string of guest appearances by Alan Cumming as Eli Gold, a cutthroat political operative whom several commentators said closely resembled White House Chief of Staff Rahm Emanuel. Ana Gasteyer, a comedian best known from her work on the sketch comedy show Saturday Night Live, also appears as Judge Patrice Lessner.

== Plot ==
With the Stern, Lockhart & Gardner firm in dire financial straits, Diane (Christine Baranski) and Will (Josh Charles) consult an efficiency expert about cuts that would help them avoid layoffs. Will calls Alicia (Julianna Margulies), but she left her phone at the apartment and he reaches Peter (Chris Noth) instead, resulting in an awkward moment between them. Alicia and Cary (Matt Czuchry) are visiting the offices of Eric Dorfman (Boris McGiver), a lawyer with whom their firm is discussing a case merger. In the middle of their discussion, federal agents arrive and arrest Dorfman for first degree murder. Assistant United States Attorney Harrison Rivers (Sharif Atkins) claims Dorfman gave the name of a federal witness to his client, drug kingpin Lemond Bishop (Mike Colter), resulting in her murder. Dorfman asks that Stern, Lockhart & Gardner defend him, but Will and Diane are hesitant due to fears that Dorfman cannot pay. However, when Rivers attempts to intimidate Will away from the case, Will decides on the spot to take it out of pride.

Alicia and Peter, who remains restless due to his house arrest, find they are getting along better. However, while searching for old tax forms in Alicia's room, Peter finds condoms in her bedside table and suspects she is sleeping with Will. An argument ensues when he confronts her about it, ending with Alicia angrily insisting that he will have to trust her. Meanwhile, political operative Eli Gold (Alan Cumming) tells Peter an anonymous Twitter user named "Upriser7" who is making disparaging posts about Alicia, some of which are true, including that Alicia and Peter are sleeping in separate rooms. When Eli later realizes the Tweets are coming from inside their house, Alicia questions whether it is her children, but they deny it. When Alicia learns her son Zach (Graham Phillips) communicates with his girlfriend Becca (Dreama Walker) with Twitter, they realize she is Upriser7, and Eli Gold confronts her at school and intimidates her into stopping the Tweets.

Later, Bishop offers the firm $200,000 in cash as a retainer to serve as his lawyer, prompting Diane and Will to weigh the ethics of defending Bishop against the firm's desperate financial need. While working on the case, Alicia realizes Dorfman's daughter Tammy (Katie Kreisler) gave the witness list to Bishop to win her father's approval. Dorfman insists he will go to jail before letting his daughter take the fall, but instead calls Bishop and threatens to give up information about him. In response, Bishop has his bodyguard Tony Grustelle (Creighton James) confess to the murder, which results in Dorfman's case getting thrown out, much to Rivers' ire. Bishop announces he is dropping Stern, Lockhart & Gardner because he prefers Dorfman. Diane and Will decide to seek a third partner with an extensive client list to keep the firm alive. The episode ends with Becca asking to have sex with Zach. Although the condoms he kept in his mother's bedside table are now missing, he leaves with Becca anyway.

== Production ==
"Fleas" was written by Amanda Segel and directed by Rosemary Rodriguez. The subplot involving Twitter addressed the growing popularity and influence of the blogosphere, demonstrating how even unsubstantiated claims and gossip on social networking sites can trickle into the public consciousness and eventually the mainstream media. The cutbacks and financial difficulties facing Stern, Lockhart & Gardner were also reflective of the global recession affecting much of the industrialized world at the time the episode first broadcast. The episode derives its title from a line in which Harrison Rivers accuses Will of being complicit with the criminals he is defending, claiming, "You wake up with fleas, counselor." "Fleas" marked the second in a string of guest appearances by Alan Cumming as Eli Gold, a political operative said to be based on White House Chief of Staff Rahm Emanuel. Both are political operatives from Chicago noted for bullying tactics and their use of foul language. "Fleas" also included an appearance by Ana Gasteyer, a comedian best known from her work on the sketch comedy show Saturday Night Live. Gasteyer portrayed Judge Patrice Lessner, who presides over the Eric Dorfman case and displays animosity toward Will.

== Cultural references ==
"Fleas" makes extensive use of Twitter, a social-networking and microblogging service in which users can make posts of up to 140 characters on a profile page. While discussing possible cuts at the firm, Will is disappointed when it is suggested he lose his season tickets to the Chicago Cubs, a baseball team with the Major League Baseball's National League. Eli Gold warns Becca if he does not stop her Tweets, the result will be similar to the 2009 horror film Drag Me to Hell, in which a young girl is tormented by demons.

== Reception ==
Blake Meredith of the Los Angeles Times called "Fleas" a "solid if not enthralling installment", but felt it was "a little heavy on the courtroom drama". He complimented the timeliness of the Twitter subplot and particularly praised the confrontation scene between Eli Gold and Becca, which he said "was so satisfying, I may have watched it twice".
