= Peter Gallagher =

American actor (born 1955)

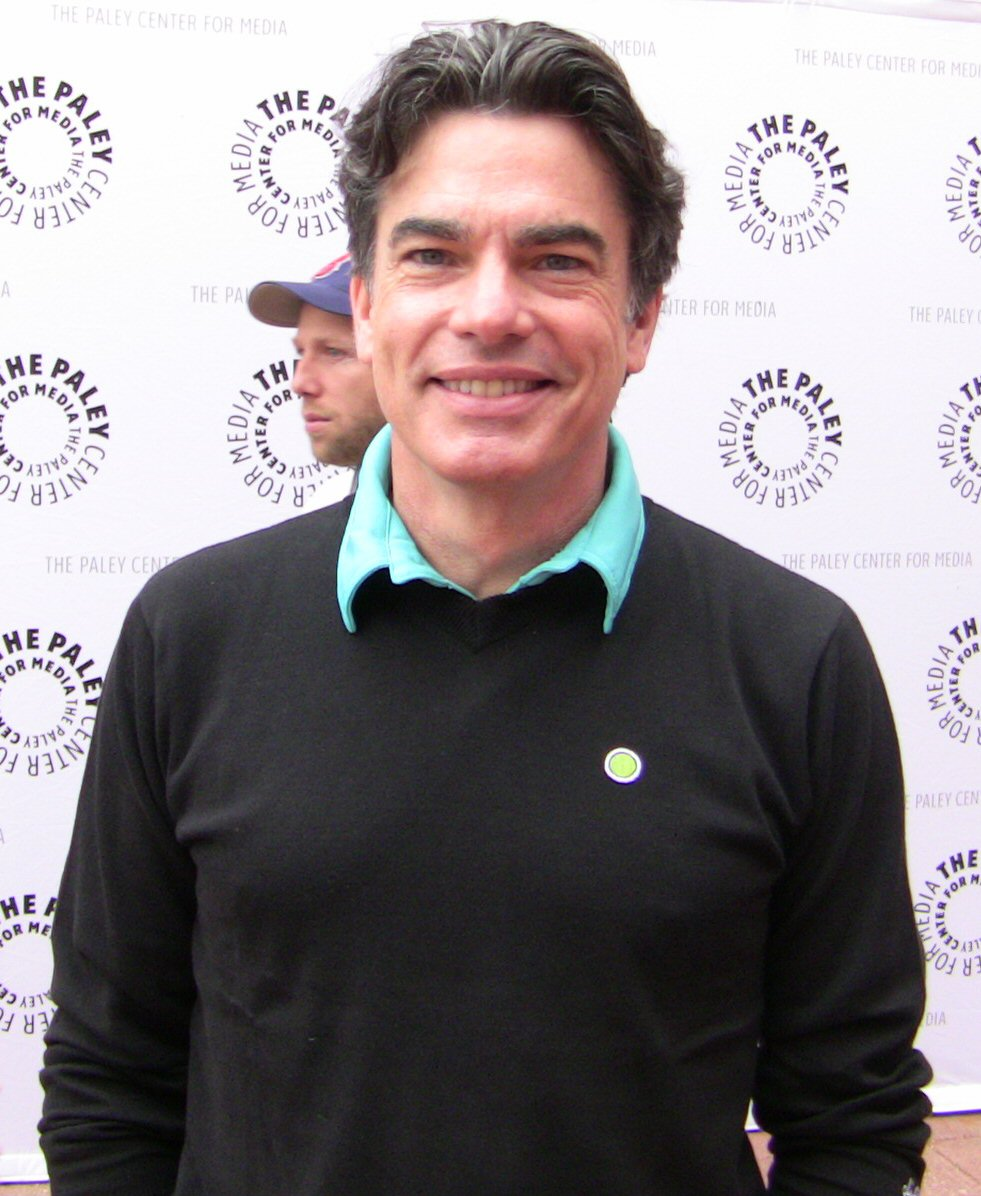
- Gallagher in 2009
- Born: Peter Killian Gallagher; August 19, 1955 (age 71); New York City, U.S.
- Education: Tufts University (BA)
- Occupations: Actor, singer
- Years active: 1976–present
- Spouse: Paula Harwood (m. 1983)
- Children: 2; including Kathryn Gallagher

Peter Killian Gallagher (born August 19, 1955) is an American actor. Since 1980, he has played roles in numerous Hollywood films. He is best known for starring as Sandy Cohen in the television drama series The O.C. from 2003 to 2007, and recurring roles in television such as Deputy Chief William Dodds on Law & Order: Special Victims Unit, Stacey Koons on the Showtime comedy-drama Californication, Nick on the Netflix series Grace & Frankie, and Director of Clandestine Services (DCS) Arthur Campbell on Covert Affairs. He also is known for his roles in the films Summer Lovers (1982), Bob Roberts (1992), The Player (1992), Short Cuts (1993), While You Were Sleeping (1995), American Beauty (1999), Mr. Deeds (2002), and Palm Springs (2020). In musical theatre, his best-known roles are that of Sky Masterson in the 1992 Broadway revival of Guys and Dolls and Oscar Jaffe in the 2015 Broadway revival of On the Twentieth Century.

== Early life and education ==
Gallagher was born in New York City. His mother, Mary Ann (née O'Shea), was a bacteriologist, and his father, Thomas Francis Gallagher, Jr., was an advertising executive. Gallagher is the youngest of their three children. He is of Irish Catholic background and was raised in Armonk, New York. Gallagher graduated from Tufts University, where he was active in theater, appearing in such shows as Stephen Sondheim's Company and singing with the all-male a cappella group the Beelzebubs. He studied acting at the William Esper Studio and with Mira Rostova.

== Career ==
Gallagher appeared on Broadway with Glenn Close in Tom Stoppard's The Real Thing and made his feature film debut in the Taylor Hackford film The Idolmaker, but first achieved fame for his role in Steven Soderbergh's sex, lies, and videotape (1989). He also starred as Sky Masterson in the 1992 Broadway hit revival of Guys and Dolls.

Gallagher played a potential career threat to Tim Robbins's studio executive in The Player (1992); the comatose fiancé of Sandra Bullock in While You Were Sleeping (1995); a major real estate salesman having an affair with Annette Bening in American Beauty (1999); a media executive in Mr. Deeds (2002); and a political reporter exposing media ethics during a presidential debate in The Last Debate.

From 2003 to 2007, Gallagher starred as Sandy Cohen, a Jewish public defender and corporate lawyer, on the Fox television show The O.C. He hosted an annual award ceremony named "The Sandy Cohen Awards" or The Sandys, which, in honor of his character on The O.C., gave a scholarship to a law school student at UC Berkeley who wanted to become a public defender.

Gallagher released an album titled 7 Days in Memphis in 2005, on the Sony BMG label. This includes a studio recording of his performance of "Don't Give Up On Me" (originally by Solomon Burke), which was featured in an episode of The O.C. He also has a video for his single "Still I Long For Your Kiss", in which he starred with his TV-wife Kelly Rowan.

In 2005, Gallagher received the P.T. Barnum Award from Tufts University for his exceptional work in the field of media and entertainment. In 2007, Gallagher received the "Light on the Hill" award at Tufts University. The award is given to notable alumni from Tufts who have demonstrated ambition, achievement, and active citizenship.

From February 13 through July 5, 2015, Gallagher starred on Broadway in On the Twentieth Century although he missed several performances in late February due to illness.

In 2020, Gallagher played Mitch Clarke, who had progressive supranuclear palsy, in a regular role in the first season of Zoey's Extraordinary Playlist. Though his character died in the season 1 finale, Gallagher appeared in several episodes of the second season and the Christmas special Zoey's Extraordinary Christmas.

In 2021, Gallagher took part in the television series Grey's Anatomy as Dr. David Hamilton.

From 2018 through 2022, Gallagher appeared in four seasons of the Netflix series Grace and Frankie as Nick, the boyfriend of Jane Fonda's character Grace.

In 2024, Gallagher returned to Broadway in a new play based on the life of Delia Ephron, titled Left on Tenth.

== Personal life ==
Gallagher is married to Paula Harwood and has two children, James and Kathryn. His daughter Kathryn is an actress and singer.

== Filmography ==
=== Film ===
Year	Title	Role	Notes
1980	The Idolmaker	Guido, Caesare	
1982	Summer Lovers	Michael Pappas	
1985	Dreamchild	Jack Dolan	
1986	My Little Girl	Kai	
1988	High Spirits	Brother Tony	
1989	Sex, Lies, and Videotape	John Mullany	
1990	Tune in Tomorrow	Richard Quince	
1991	Milena	Pollak	
1991	The Cabinet of Dr. Ramirez	Matt	
1991	Late for Dinner	Bob Freeman	
1992	The Player	Larry Levy	
1992	Bob Roberts	Dan Riley	
1993	Watch It	John	
1993	Short Cuts	Stormy Weathers	Golden Globe Special Ensemble Cast Award (non-competitive); Volpi Cup for Best Ensemble Cast
1993	Malice	Atty. Dennis Riley	
1994	The Hudsucker Proxy	Vic Tenetta	
1994	Mrs. Parker and the Vicious Circle	Alan Campbell	
1994	Mother's Boys	Robert Madigan	
1994	White Mile	Jack Robbins	
1995	The Underneath	Michael Chambers	
1995	While You Were Sleeping	Peter Callaghan	
1995	Cafe Society	Jack Kale	
1996	Last Dance	John Hayes	
1996	To Gillian on Her 37th Birthday	David Lewis	
1997	The Man Who Knew Too Little	James 'Jimmy' Ritchie	
1997	Path to Paradise	John Anticev	
1998	Johnny Skidmarks	Johnny Scardino	
1999	House on Haunted Hill	Donald W. Blackburn, M.D.	
1999	American Beauty	Buddy Kane	Screen Actors Guild Award for Outstanding Performance by a Cast in a Motion Picture
2000	Center Stage	Jonathan Reeves	
2000	Other Voices	Jordin	
2001	Perfume	Guido	
2001	Protection	Ted	
2002	Mr. Deeds	Chuck Cedar	
2002	The Adventures of Tom Thumb and Thumbelina	Mole King	Voice, direct-to-video
2003	How to Deal	Len Martin	Uncredited
2008	Center Stage: Turn It Up	Jonathan Reeves	
2009	Adam	Marty Buchwald	
2009	The War Boys	Slater Welch	
2010	Conviction	Barry Scheck	
2010	Burlesque	Vincent "Vince" Scali	
2011	Someday This Pain Will Be Useful to You	Paul Sveck	
2012	Step Up Revolution	William "Bill" Anderson	
2015	Hello, My Name Is Doris	Willy Williams	
2017	Literally, Right Before Aaron	Orson Schwartzman	
2017	Submission	Len Curry	
2017	A Bad Moms Christmas	Hank Redmond	
2019	After	Ken Scott	
2020	Palm Springs	Howard Wilder	
2024	Humane	Charles York	

=== Television films ===
Year	Title	Role	Notes
1984	Terrible Joe Moran	Nick	
1987	Long Day's Journey into Night	Edmund Tyrone	
1988	The Caine Mutiny Court-Martial	Lt. Cmdr. John Challee	
1988	I'll Be Home for Christmas	Aaron Coplan	
1990	Love and Lies	David West	
1998	Brave New World	Bernard Marx	
1998	Virtual Obsession	Dr. Joe Messenger	
1999	Brotherhood of Murder	Bob Mathews	
2000	The Last Debate	Tom Chapman	
2000	Cupid & Cate	Harry	
2001	Feast of All Saints	Philippe Ferronaire	
2003	A Tale of Two Wives	Bill Goodman	
2016	Center Stage: On Pointe	Jonathan Reeves	
2021	One December Night	Mike Sullivan	

=== Television series ===
Year	Title	Role	Notes
1979	Guiding Light	Chuck Haskell	Unknown episodes
1980	Skag	John Skagska	6 episodes
1982	American Playhouse	Logan Melton	Episode: "Private Contentment"
1984	ABC Weekend Specials	Phil Grey	Episode: "A Different Twist"
1987	Private Eye	Tommy Baron	Episode: "Blue Hotel Part 1"
1988	American Playhouse	Charles Castle	Episode: "The Big Knife"
1988	The Murder of Mary Phagan	Leo Frank	2 episodes
1991	An Inconvenient Woman	Phillip Quennell	2 episodes
1993	Fallen Angels	Dr. Yorgrau	Episode: "The Quiet Room"
1993	Fallen Angels	Mitch Allison	Episode: "The Frightening Frammis"
1996	Titanic	Wynn Park	2 episodes
1998	Homicide: Life on the Street	Chris Rawls	Episode: "Closet Cases"
1998	Superman: The Animated Series	Kurt	Voice, episode: "Where There's Smoke"
1998–1999	The Secret Lives of Men	Michael	13 episodes
2001	Family Guy	Jared	Voice, episode: "Lethal Weapons"
2003–2007	The O.C.	Sandy Cohen	Main role, 92 episodes Nominated—Teen Choice Award for Choice TV Parental Unit (2005−06)
2006	Robot Chicken	Additional voices	2 episodes
2007	The Gathering	Dr. Michael Foster	2 episodes
2008	Shark	Frank Bell	Episode: "Partners in Crime"
2009	Californication	Dean Stacey Koons	8 episodes
2010	Rescue Me	Father Phil Bingham	5 episodes
2010–2014	Covert Affairs	Arthur Campbell	Main role, 68 episodes
2011	Whitney	Vince	3 episodes
2012	How I Met Your Mother	Professor Vinick	Episode: "The Final Page"
2015	The Good Wife	Ethan Carver	3 episodes
2015–2016	Togetherness	Larry Kosinski	Recurring role, 9 episodes Nominated—Critics' Choice Television Award for Best Guest Performer in a Comedy Series
2016	New Girl	Gavin Schmidt	4 episodes
2016	Cruel Intentions	Edward Valmont	Unaired pilot
2014–2019	Law & Order: Special Victims Unit	Deputy Chief William Dodds	Recurring role, 19 episodes
2017	Man Seeking Woman	Joel Greenberg	Episode: "Dolphin"
2017–2022	Grace and Frankie	Nick Skolka	Recurring role, 24 episodes
2018	The Gifted	Benedict Ryan	5 episodes
2018	Murphy Brown	John Haggerty	Episode: "Results May Vary"
2019	The Conners	Brian Foster	Episode: "Rage Against the Machine"
2020–2021	Zoey's Extraordinary Playlist	Mitch Clarke	Main role, 13 episodes Guest role, 2 episodes
2021–2023	The Owl House	Dell Clawthorne	Voice, 2 episodes
2021–2022	Grey's Anatomy	Dr. David Hamilton	Recurring role
2022	Mr. Mayor	Brett	Episode: "Trampage"
2022	Reboot	Tyler	Episode: "Who's the Boss"
2025	Wondla	Antiquus	Episode: "Chapter 12: Truth"
2025	Everybody's Live with John Mulaney	Future John Mulaney	Episode: "Is Uber Good?"

== Stage credits ==
Year	Title	Role	Notes
1977	Hair	Claude	
1978	Grease	Danny Zuko	Broadway
1981	Romeo and Juliet	Benvolio	
1982	A Doll's Life	Otto	Broadway; Theatre World Award
1983	The Corn Is Green	Morgan Evans	Broadway
1983	Another Country	Guy Bennett	
1984	The Real Thing	Billy	Broadway; Clarence Derwent Awards—Most Promising Male
1985–1986	Pride and Prejudice	Fitzwilliam Darcy	
1986	Long Day's Journey Into Night	Edmund Tyrone	Broadway; Nominated—Tony Award for Best Featured Actor in a Play
1992	Guys and Dolls	Sky Masterson	Broadway; Nominated—Drama Desk Award for Outstanding Actor in a Musical
1995	Pal Joey	Joey Evans	
2001–2002	Noises Off	Lloyd Dallas	Broadway
2002	Funny Girl	Nick Arnstein	Broadway Concert
2002	The Exonerated	Kerry Max Cook	
2008	The Country Girl	Bernie Dodd	Broadway
2015	On the Twentieth Century	Oscar Jaffe	Broadway
2019	The Little Mermaid	King Triton	Concert
2024	Left on Tenth	Peter	Broadway
