= Left on Tenth (play) =

2024 stage play by Delia Ephron

- Written by: Delia Ephron
- Characters: Delia; Peter
- Original language: English
- Genre: Romantic Comedy

Premiere
- Date premiered: 2024
- Place premiered: James Earl Jones Theatre

Left on Tenth is a stage play written by American writer Delia Ephron, based on her autobiography of the same name.

== Synopsis ==
The play tells the story of Delia Ephron and her journey through a late in life relationship and eventual marriage to Peter Rutter, a man from her past that comes back into her life unexpectedly after the death of her husband.

== Production history ==
The play is scheduled to premiere on Broadway at the James Earl Jones Theatre, directed by Susan Stroman. The production has previews scheduled to begin September 26, 2024 with a planned opening date of October 23, 2024. The two lead characters will be portrayed by Julianna Margulies and Peter Gallagher. The play will mark Ephron's Broadway debut as a playwright and comes after she released her autobiography of the same name in 2022.

== Cast and characters ==
Character	Broadway (2024)
Delia Ephron	Julianna Margulies
Peter Rutter	Peter Gallagher
Various Characters	Kate MacCluggage
Various Characters	Peter Francis James
