= Paul Margulies =

American advertising executive

Paul Eli Margulies (1935–2014) was an American writer, philosopher and advertising-industry creative director. Margulies wrote jingles like "Plop, Plop, Fizz, Fizz, Oh What a Relief it Is!" and invented tag lines such as "I can't believe I ate the whole thing". A graduate of Dartmouth with a degree in philosophy, Margulies retired at an early age to write about philosophy.

Margulies was the son of Henrietta (née Greenspan) and Irving Margulies. Although known on Madison Avenue for his work in advertising, Margulies was best known (at the time of his death) as the father of actress Julianna Margulies.
