= Bang (The Good Wife) =

- The Good Wife episode
- Episode no.: Season 1 Episode 15
- Directed by: Rod Holcomb
- Written by: Courtney Kemp Agboh
- Original air date: March 2, 2010

Guest appearances
- Alan Cumming as Eli Gold; Gary Cole as Kurt McVeigh; Tom Degnan as Brad Broussard; Halley Wegryn Gross as Judtih Broussard; Geraldine Hughes as Rachel Knox; Kevin O'Rourke as Martin Knox; Chris Scully as Frank Bara

Episode chronology
← Previous "Hi"	Next → "Fleas"
- The Good Wife (season 1)

"Bang" is the fifteenth episode of the first season of the American legal drama television series The Good Wife. It aired on CBS in the United States on March 2, 2010. In the episode, ex-States Attorney Peter Florrick (Chris Noth) is released from prison to his home. He is confined to house arrest and starts working on restarting his legal career. His wife Alicia Florrick (Julianna Margulies) has conflicted emotions about his return and distracts herself with a legal case, in which she defends a man accused of killing a mutual fund manager who assisted in Bernard Madoff's investment scandal.

The episode was written by co-producer and staff writer Courtney Kemp Agboh and directed by Rod Holcomb. "Bang" included guest appearances by actors Alan Cumming and Gary Cole. Cole plays a forensics expert with a country persona and a strong set of ethics, while Cumming plays a cutthroat political operative several commentators said closely resembled White House Chief of Staff Rahm Emanuel. The opening scene of "Bang", in which Peter returns home to his family, was planned to be the final scene of the series if the first season was unsuccessful and additional episodes were not ordered.

"Bang" received positive reviews, with several critics complimenting the ensemble performances, as well as Cole and actress Christine Baranski.

== Plot ==
Ex-State's Attorney Peter Florrick (Chris Noth) returns home to an emotional reunion with his children, Zach (Graham Phillips) and Grace (Makenzie Vega), while his wife Alicia (Julianna Margulies) looks on. Peter had been imprisoned for several months after being convicted of charges of corruption. He is allowed to return home under house arrest while his appeal is considered. Peter must wear an ankle monitor and cannot leave the apartment or communicate with the outside world. Alicia is uncomfortable about Peter's return because of his infidelity, which was exposed at the time of his conviction.

Zach shows Peter incriminating photos he had been hiding from Alicia, which are doctored to show Peter being unfaithful. Zach intercepted the photos when they were anonymously delivered to the Florrick residence. Zach also shows Peter a photo he secretly took of a man bugging the Florrick apartment entranceway. Peter hires hardened and blunt political operative Eli Gold (Alan Cumming) to assist in the appeal. Gold recognizes the man as a federal investigator and informs Peter he is under investigation by the FBI. Peter reveals to Alicia that Zach hid the photos from her to spare her feelings.

Because of Peter's imprisonment Alicia, a lawyer herself, is working as a junior associate at a law firm. Alicia serves as second chair for senior partner Diane Lockhart (Christine Baranski) in a murder trial. Their client, Brad Broussard (Tom Degnan), is charged with shooting Miles Wagner. Wagner was an unpopular mutual fund manager who defrauded Broussard and many other out of their life savings by assisting in Bernard Madoff's investment scandal. Broussard was found covered in blood next to Wagner's body, but insists on his innocence. Diane consults ballistics expert Kurt McVeigh (Gary Cole), a mustachioed country man with a strict principle that he will not work if the client is guilty. Kurt testifies that Wagner was shot inside a car despite being found on the floor. Wagner's partner, Martin Knox (Kevin O'Rourke), had a strong financial motive to kill Wagner. Knox's wife, Rachel (Geraldine Hughes), strongly dislikes her husband and is willing to implicate him, but is bound by spousal privilege laws. Alicia discovers a conspiracy tactic that will allow Rachel to testify, and Broussard is vindicated and set free. The firm's investigator Kalinda Sharma (Archie Panjabi) visits FBI agent Lana Delaney (Jill Flint) inquiring about the investigation into Peter. Delaney asks Kalinda to feed her information about Peter, but Kalinda declines.

== Production ==
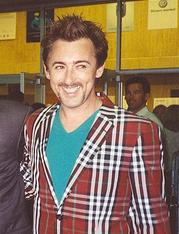
Alan Cumming (pictured) made a guest appearance in "Bang" as Eli Gold, a political consultant commentators said mirrored Rahm Emanuel.

"Bang" was written by Courtney Kemp Agboh and directed by Rod Holcomb. The writers based the episode on the Ponzi scheme orchestrated by Bernard Madoff, who was sentenced to prison in 2009 after pleading guilty to defrauding thousands of clients out of billions of dollars with an investor fraud scheme. The anger expressed by onlookers at the Miles Wagner trial in The Good Wife reflected the passionate emotions the real-life Madoff scandal evoked. "Bang" featured guest appearances by actors Alan Cumming and Gary Cole. Some commentators suggested Cumming's character, Eli Gold, was based on White House Chief of Staff Rahm Emanuel. Both are political operatives from Chicago noted for bullying tactics and their use of foul language.

If The Good Wife had not been successful and the first season was not renewed beyond its first 13 episodes, creators Robert and Michelle King planned to end their final episode with a scene in which Peter returns home and greets his emotionally conflicted wife; because the season was continued, it ultimately became the opening scene of "Bang". Robert King said he considered using it as a final scene because, "You would never have wanted to end it where it would be such a conclusion that everyone’s satisfied, because that’s not Alicia’s life. Alicia’s life is filled with questions." Chris Noth said now that Peter is back home, much of the rest of the season will focus on whether Alicia can forgive his past infidelity, adding, "I don't know if they'll be able to recover or not. That's part of the ongoing drama."

== Cultural references ==
Kya Poole refers to Eli Gold as a "wartime consigliere", a reference to the Tom Hagen lawyer character in the 1972 Mafia film The Godfather. In turn, Gold disparagingly refers to Poole as a "Shiksa Bambi", a reference to the title character of the 1942 Disney animated film Bambi, about a young deer unaccustomed to the realities and horrors of the real world.

Kurt McVeigh's country mannerisms and dress prompt Diane to refer to him as the Marlboro Man, a cowboy-like figure used in tobacco advertisements for Marlboro cigarettes. Upon learning about his morals, Diane said he was like something out of a novel by Herman Melville, the 19th century novelist who wrote Moby-Dick. She also jokingly asks whether Kurt is related to Timothy McVeigh, the man convicted of the 1995 Oklahoma City bombing. Diane, a liberal, is taken aback by the conservative Kurt's enthusiasm for Sarah Palin, the 2008 Republican vice presidential nominee. As a joke, Kurt sends her a copy of Palin's 2009 memoir, Going Rogue: An American Life. She in turn sends him the parody book Going Rouge: A Candid Look Inside the Mind of Political Conservative Sarah Palin, which is filled with empty pages.

== Distribution ==
"Bang" first aired on CBS in the United States on March 2, 2010, marking the first episode of The Good Wife in three weeks after a break due to the 2010 Winter Olympics. At the same time, it was simulcast on the Global Television Network in Canada. The episode aired on NET 5 in the Netherlands on April 2, 2010. The day following its American broadcast, "Bang" was made available for download at the digital media store iTunes.

== Reception ==
In its original American broadcast, "Bang" was seen by 13.3 million viewers among adults between ages 18 and 49, according to Nielsen Media Research. It marked a 13 percent drop in viewership from the previous original episode. Commentators suggested The Good Wife suffered slightly in the ratings due to the NBC debut of Parenthood, which premiered in the same timeslot to 8.1 million viewers in the 18 to 49 age group. "Bang" was the 15th most watched television program the week it first aired. It received a 2.7 rating/8 share among viewers between 18 and 49.

The episode received generally positive reviews. Jeremy Gerard of Bloomberg L.P. said the episode continues to maintain "with considerable grace" a strong balance between legal and domestic drama. Gerard also praised the performances of Cumming, Margulies and Panjabi. Mandi Bierly particularly praised the sexual tension between Alicia and Will, calling their moment together "one of the sexiest scenes between two non-touching people wearing suits ever". USA Today television critic Robert Bianco said the Broussard murder plot was "unusually weak", but praised the performances of Cumming, Cole and Baranski, who she said was turning Diane from a two-dimensional mean boss into an "appealingly complicated, generally admirable character". Hal Boedeker of the Orlando Sentinel called it "another outstanding episode" and particularly praised the scenes between Baranski and Cole. The Cincinnati Enquirer described it as a "pivotal episode" due to Peter's return home from jail, and listed it as a "must see" show.

Los Angeles Times writer Meredith Blake praised the episode, particularly the chemistry between Diane and Kurt, which she called the "most amusing plotline" of the episode. Blake also complimented Alan Cummings' performance and the sexual tension between Will and Alicia. Philadelphia Daily News television critic Ellen Gray said the homecoming between Peter and Alicia was satisfying, as was the chemistry between Alicia and Will. Gray praised the performances of Cumming and particularly Noth, who he said "manages to command attention whenever he's onscreen".
