= The Good Wife season 3 =

The Good Wife
- Season 3
- Season 3 U.S. DVD cover
- Starring: Julianna Margulies; Matt Czuchry; Archie Panjabi; Graham Phillips; Makenzie Vega; Alan Cumming; Josh Charles; Christine Baranski
- No. of episodes: 22

Release
- Original network: CBS
- Original release: September 25, 2011 – April 29, 2012

Season chronology
- ← Previous; Season 2 Next → Season 4

The third season of The Good Wife began airing on September 25, 2011, and concluded on April 29, 2012.

== Premise ==
The series focuses on Alicia Florrick, whose husband Peter, the former Cook County, Illinois State's Attorney, has been jailed following a notorious political corruption and sex scandal. After having spent the previous thirteen years as a stay-at-home mother, Alicia returns to the workforce as a litigator to provide for her two children.

== Cast ==
=== Main ===
- Julianna Margulies as Alicia Florrick
- Matt Czuchry as Cary Agos
- Archie Panjabi as Kalinda Sharma
- Makenzie Vega as Grace Florrick
- Graham Phillips as Zach Florrick
- Alan Cumming as Eli Gold
- Josh Charles as Will Gardner
- Christine Baranski as Diane Lockhart

=== Recurring ===
- Chris Noth as Peter Florrick
- Monica Raymund as Dana Lodge
- Mary Beth Peil as Jackie Florrick
- Anna Camp as Caitlin D'arcy
- Zach Grenier as David Lee
- Anika Noni Rose as Wendy Scott-Carr
- Michael Boatman as Julius Cain
- Renée Elise Goldsberry as Geneva Pine
- Carrie Preston as Elsbeth Tascioni
- Jerry Adler as Howard Lyman
- Lisa Edelstein as Celeste Serrano
- Michael J. Fox as Louis Canning
- Parker Posey as Vanessa Gold
- Amy Sedaris as Stacie Hall
- Tim Guinee as Andrew Wiley
- Dallas Roberts as Owen Cavanaugh
- Mike Pniewski as Frank Landau
- Dylan Baker as Colin Sweeney
- Jill Flint as Lana Delaney
- Matthew Perry as Mike Kresteva
- Kurt Fuller as Peter Dunaway, a judge
- Romany Malco as Justin Coyne
- Michael Kelly as Mickey Gunn

=== Guest ===
- Nina Arianda as Gretchen Battista
- Kristen Connolly as Maggie Reeves
- James Eckhouse as Walter Kermani
- Emily Swallow as Mandy Cox
- Eddie Izzard as James Thrush
- Nicole Beharie as Imani Stonehouse, an assistant US attorney
- Harvey Fierstein as Francis Flamm, a judge
- Sterling K. Brown as Andrew Boylan
- Wayne Duvall as Harcourt, a detective
- Meghann Fahy as Shelby Hale
- Anthony Ruivivar as Moyer, a police captain
- Michael Irby as Ricky Parker
- Mike Colter as Lemond Bishop
- Denis O'Hare as Charles Abernathy, a judge
- Chris Butler as Matan Brody
- Titus Welliver as Glenn Childs
- Gary Cole as Kurt McVeigh
- Martha Plimpton as Patti Nyholm
- Mamie Gummer as Nancy Crozier
- Rita Wilson as Viola Walsh
- Sarah Steele as Marissa Gold
- John Benjamin Hickey as Neil Gross
- Joe Morton as Daniel Golden
- David Paymer as Richard Cuesta, a judge
- Kelli Giddish as Sophia Russo
- Morena Baccarin as Isobel Swift
- Jonathan Groff as Jimmy Fellner

== Episodes ==
No. overall	No. in season	Title	Directed by	Written by	Original release date	US viewers (millions)
47	1	"A New Day"	Brooke Kennedy	Story by : Meredith Averill; Teleplay by : Robert King & Michelle King	September 25, 2011	10.66
A new, more confident Alicia takes center stage in defending a Muslim college student accused of assaulting a Jewish student during a campus brawl. At first, the case seems relatively easy – there is no physical evidence linking their client to the crime, and the trumped-up hate crime charge they are fighting smacks of Peter trying to make a statement during his first week back on the job. When Kalinda finds a photo that seems to prove their client was elsewhere at the time the crime was committed, it appears that Lockhart/Gardner has secured the win. The trial takes a turn, however, when Cary and the prosecution reveal their plan: this new evidence may have exonerated Alicia's client from the assault, but it makes him the primary suspect in a murder investigation.
48	2	"The Death Zone"	Jim McKay	Story by : Leonard Dick; Teleplay by : Robert King & Michelle King	October 2, 2011	11.08
The author of a book about a Mount Everest expedition is being sued for libel, and Lockhart/Gardner is handling his case. The plaintiff claims that the book makes it look like he let a man die near the top of the mountain to get to the peak and his reputation has suffered ever since. After Will gets the case dismissed in US court, though, the plaintiff decides to re-sue in the British courts. Lockhart/Gardner must defend their case again, this time in an unfamiliar judicial system where the burden of proof lies with the defendant. Eli and Kalinda work together to try and uncover a political scandal before it happens. As part of Peter's duties as the new state's attorney, he must find a law firm to handle the county's civil needs. Diane believes that Lockhart/Gardner has the inside track to win the job, and she is startled when Peter seems to be setting them up by telling her that the firm will need to submit to a voluntary audit if they want to be considered for the contract. For the first time, the partners of Lockhart/Gardner question Alicia's true allegiance.
49	3	"Get a Room"	David Platt	Story by : Julia Wolfe; Teleplay by : Robert King & Michelle King	October 9, 2011	10.28
Will and Alicia are stuck together in a hotel for a week of mandatory mediation in Lockhart/Gardner's latest case. Their client is suing her doctor for implanting a surgical device of his own design in her back during a medical procedure. She claims she had no idea she was being subjected to experimental medicine and has been in constant pain ever since. Complicating matters is that opposing counsel is Will's old flame Celeste Serrano. She knows all his tricks, and her strong connection with Will seems to spark a little jealousy in Alicia. Eli takes charge of a crisis management case when a batch of tainted cheese leads to a listeriosis outbreak in an elementary school.
50	4	"Feeding the Rat"	Frederick E.O. Toye	Keith Eisner	October 16, 2011	10.33
Alicia works on a pro bono case, defending a man who stands accused of committing murder during a convenience store robbery that went wrong. Even though her client is innocent, a witness has identified him as the shooter. Matters are complicated further when Diane, trying to keep the firm afloat during hard economic times, tells Alicia to plead it out – she wants all of her attorneys on paid cases only. When Diane discovers that Celeste Serrano's old firm has gone under and Will's former partner is looking for a new place to take her lucrative bankruptcy division, Will attempts to get her on board at Lockhart/Gardner. Serrano, however, has other plans: she wants Will to leave the firm and come work with her.
51	5	"Marthas and Caitlins"	Félix Alcalá	Ted Humphrey	October 23, 2011	9.77
Lockhart/Gardner's case against an aviation company takes a huge hit when their key witness commits suicide and his testimony is ruled inadmissible. The only other person with inside knowledge of the plane's design flaw is Colin Sweeney, a venture capitalist that Alicia defended on a murder charge two years ago, who has been in jail ever since. His testimony comes with a price – his freedom. Cary will not let him go unless he agrees to wear a wire and get a jailhouse confession from one of the most dangerous killers in the Illinois prison system. At the same time, Eli tries to get Peter the keynote address at the upcoming Democratic National Convention, while Alicia is told that she is to handle the hiring of a new first-year associate.
52	6	"Affairs of State"	Dean Parisot	Corinne Brinkerhoff	October 30, 2011	10.60
Cary clashes with Lockhart/Gardner yet again when two male students are accused of murdering a female classmate on a college booze cruise. Complicating matters is that both of the accused men are sons of foreign dignitaries and appear to be protected from prosecution thanks to diplomatic immunity. While one of the suspects walks, the other must stand trial because his father is from Taiwan – a country not recognized by the US. As Cary attempts to pin the murder on Lockhart/Gardner's suddenly vulnerable client, Alicia and Caitlin look for a way to prove that the other diplomat's son was the one who did the deed. Eli is approached by his ex-wife in a professional capacity; she wants him to vet her in preparation for a possible state senate run.
53	7	"Executive Order 13224"	Brooke Kennedy	Leonard Dick	November 6, 2011	9.07
Lockhart/Gardner takes on the US Government on behalf of a military contractor who claims that he was imprisoned and tortured by the Army in Afghanistan. While Diane and the team plow through boxes of censored documents looking for evidence, Alicia must meet with a government monitor whose authority overrides attorney/client privilege. When opposing counsel reveals damning new evidence about her client, Alicia is asked by the monitor to reveal information that would lead to his imprisonment or she could end up in jail. At the state's attorney's office, Peter decides to follow up on a fifteen-year-old case claiming that Will Gardner stole $45,000 from a client at his old firm in Maryland to fund his gambling addiction.
54	8	"Death Row Tip"	Joshua Marston	Story by : Matthew Montoya; Teleplay by : Robert King & Michelle King	November 13, 2011	10.24
An interview with a gang member on death row leads Cary and the state's attorney's office to two dead bodies that had been buried in a vacant lot. One victim was another gang member but the second was an innocent young woman who had gone missing several months ago. Ballistics evidence points to the woman's boyfriend, Lockhart/Gardner's client, as her killer. Will, Diane and Alicia believe that the murders were related and both victims were probably shot by a third gang member who is still at large. Because the only person who might know the truth is a vicious killer slated to be executed by the state in 36 hours, the Lockhart/Gardner team must find a way to get a stay of execution for a guilty man before time runs out for their client. A campaign manager, Mickey Gunn, comes to Eli for help. He has a promising young politician with a humorous skeleton in his closet: a drunken Facebook picture showing his client stooping in front of a Santa Claus statue, as if performing fellatio. Eli must figure out a way to spin the story before it sinks Mickey's client's campaign hopes.
55	9	"Whiskey Tango Foxtrot"	Rosemary Rodriguez	Robert King & Michelle King & Meredith Averill	November 20, 2011	9.79
Will and Alicia are back in military court, this time defending a young female remote drone operator accused of murdering twelve civilians in Afghanistan. The prosecution argues that the order to fire the drone's rocket was rescinded but that the defendant fired anyway. When their only witness decides to testify for the prosecution, Will and Alicia must find a new way to persuade a military jury of their client's innocence. Lockhart/Gardner is faced with losing the cheese lobby, one of their biggest clients. The firm turns to Eli in the hopes that he can convince the FDA to reinstate the existing food pyramid and promote cheese consumption. In his counterpart for the fruit lobby, Eli finds an opponent who always seems to be one step ahead of him. The state's investigation into Will Gardner heats up when Peter assigns the case to Wendy Scott-Carr, his former rival for the state's attorney's job and a woman who will apparently stop at nothing to weed out corruption.
56	10	"Parenting Made Easy"	Rosemary Rodriguez	Story by : Courtney Kemp Agboh; Teleplay by : Robert King & Michelle King	December 4, 2011	9.94
Alicia mentors Caitlin through her first arbitration case, defending a college professor who claims she was laid off after refusing her boss's sexual advances. When Alicia learns that opposing counsel is Martha, the associate that she had previously wanted to hire in preference to Caitlin (Ep. 305), the proceedings swiftly become antagonistic. When testimony reveals another possible cause for the defendant's job loss – her staunch right-wing beliefs – the case becomes an issue of freedom of expression. This twist removes the damages cap originally imposed by the arbitrator, making it potentially far more lucrative for Lockart/Gardner. With so much more at stake, Martha's boss Louis Canning starts taking a more active role in the case. It is Alicia vs. Canning once more, this time clashing as the puppet masters of their first-year associates. While Alicia meets with Canning, she checks her phone and realizes that she has twelve missed calls from her daughter Grace. When all attempts to track down Grace initially fail, Alicia fears the worst. As the hours pass, Alicia wonders if she has been prioritizing her work and her relationship with Will above her family.
57	11	"What Went Wrong"	James Whitmore Jr.	Story by : Keith Eisner; Teleplay by : Robert King & Michelle King	December 11, 2011	11.56
When the jury in a murder case comes back with a guilty verdict after the legal teams on both sides assumed there would be an acquittal, Will, Alicia and Diane work to figure out what went wrong. With Kalinda's help, the firm learns that something made over half the jurors change their mind during deliberations. With time running out before sentencing, it is up to Lockart/Gardner to convince the judge to vacate the ruling. Alicia's romance with Will being over, she looks to rekindle old friendships to find some companionship. When she learns that Kalinda played a major role in finding Grace, she realizes that a friendship she once thought was dead forever might be worth salvaging.
58	12	"Alienation of Affection"	Michael Zinberg	Robert King & Michelle King & Corinne Brinkerhoff	January 8, 2012	11.65
Alicia, Will, Diane and David Lee are being sued by a couple whose divorce Lockart/Gardner handled during Alicia's first year with the firm. The couple, having reconciled, claim that the firm deliberately split them up to make a commission on the liquidation of the company the couple started together. Their argument has some merit, too, as David Lee used some less-than-savory methods in order to get full custody of the children for his client. As the partners squabble over who was really at fault, the onus falls on Alicia, who as a first-year associate was assigned to get their client to sign the crucial document that would let Lockhart/Gardner off the hook – a document that is now missing. As Wendy Scott-Carr's investigation of Will heats up, he hires Elsbeth Tascioni to represent him and fight back.
59	13	"Bitcoin for Dummies"	Frederick E. O. Toye	Story by : Courtney Kemp Agboh; Teleplay by : Robert King & Michelle King	January 15, 2012	9.45
Alicia and Lockhart/Gardner face off against the US Treasury Department once again, this time aiding Dylan Stack, a lawyer who represents the pseudonymous Satoshi Nakamoto (creator of Bitcoin) – an online currency with mysterious origins. Alicia's client is being pressured to reveal the name of the Bitcoin creator so that the government can prosecute him for creating what they believe to be a currency in direct competition with the US Dollar. When the judge rules that attorney/client privilege prevents Stack from having to reveal the name of his client, the Treasury Department changes tactics and decides to prosecute Stack as the creator of Bitcoin. Wendy Scott-Carr's investigation into Will continues. When Dana Lodge discovers some damning information that might send Alicia to prison, she approaches Kalinda with an ultimatum: help the state's attorney's office prosecute Will or they will go after Alicia.
60	14	"Another Ham Sandwich"	Frederick E.O. Toye	Leonard Dick	January 29, 2012	11.08
A grand jury has been empaneled and it appears to be a foregone conclusion that Will Gardner will be indicted for bribing a judge. As Lockhart/Gardner circles the wagons and prepares for the worst, Alicia is brought into the fold and learns how bad things have got for the first time. Will's strategy is to try to tie Peter in as much as possible, hoping that Cary will persuade him to see that he might hurt himself by going after Will. The state's attorney's office has a secret weapon: inside information provided by Kalinda in exchange for keeping quiet about a document that might send Alicia to jail. With the future of the firm in the balance, Alicia is called to the stand and asked, under oath, to answer tough questions that she was not expecting concerning a sexual relationship with Will. Eli's feud with David Lee continues when Eli realizes Caitlin's connection to his nemesis and decides to bury her with meaningless clerical work. His feud with rival crisis manager Stacie Hall also takes an interesting twist when she admits to having feelings for him while the two battle over a lucrative account.
61	15	"Live from Damascus"	Brooke Kennedy	Story by : Ted Humphrey; Teleplay by : Robert King & Michelle King & Leonard Dick	February 19, 2012	9.73
Lockhart/Gardner represents the families of two Americans who were detained and killed by the Syrian government during the civil war. They claim that the tech company ChumHum knowingly sold infiltration and decryption software to Syria in violation of US law – software that allowed the government to track down and murder its enemies. If ChumHum knowingly sold their software to Syria, proving it is another matter entirely; when the defense produces a photograph that shows that one the missing dissidents may still be alive, Will, Diane and Alicia must decide whether or not it is worth jeopardizing their case for the chance to bring her home. The mood at the firm is exuberant following the grand jury's decision not to indict Will. As a parting shot, Wendy Scott-Carr tipped the Chicago Bar Association off about Will's indiscretions 15 years ago in Baltimore. As Will knows, there is no statute of limitations on disbarment.
62	16	"After the Fall"	James Whitmore Jr.	Meredith Averill	March 4, 2012	9.83
Alicia defends a documentary film maker who is accused of being responsible for the suicide of a college girl while making a movie about people who kill themselves. The defense's path to victory is blocked by old nemesis Nancy Crozier and a judge who seems to buy Nancy's folksy, innocent act at every turn. When the firm again turns to Caitlin to try and win over the judge and jury, Alicia begins to wonder if her protégé might be her biggest competition at Lockhart/Gardner. As Will serves out his suspension at home under the watchful eyes of his two nosy and manipulative sisters, the power vacuum at Lockhart/Gardner draws the attention of Eli, Julius and David Lee, each of whom wants his name on the company letterhead. Peter struggles with his political campaign as he realizes that his decision to hire people based solely on merit has cost him many of his former allies.
63	17	"Long Way Home"	Nelson McCormick	Keith Eisner	March 11, 2012	9.88
After being released from prison, Lockhart/Gardner client Colin Sweeney attempts to convince the shareholders of his former company to vote him back in as CEO. At the eleventh hour, a former employee Isobel Swift publicly accuses Sweeney of sexually harassing her, going as far as to produce a baby who was allegedly fathered by him. Alicia and the firm have 72 hours to prove the allegations are false before Sweeney is forced out of his company for good – a task made more difficult due to the fact that Sweeney will lie to anyone, including his lawyers, to get what he wants. It transpires that Sweeney really is the child's father but that Isobel became pregnant by Spermjacking. Ultimately, he and Isobel settle their differences outside of court. After getting engaged, Caitlin decides to leave Lockhart/Gardner and give up her career to start a family. At the state's attorney's office, Peter forces Cary to investigate employee sexual fraternization, putting him in an awkward position thanks to his own transgressions with Dana Lodge. When Alicia's apartment building decides to convert to condos, she is faced with the possibility of having to move.
64	18	"Gloves Come Off"	Michael Zinberg	Story by : Matthew Montoya; Teleplay by : Leonard Dick	March 18, 2012	9.58
Lockhart/Gardner represents a client who suffered severe injuries and lost his wife when a snowmobile malfunctioned and struck a tree. With a sympathetic judge and video evidence, the case seems like a slam dunk. All of that changes when the opposition argues that the client's ability to maneuver the snowmobile was impaired due to injuries sustained during a fight on the ice when he was a professional hockey player. To counter, Alicia and her legal team decide to add the hockey league to the lawsuit as well. Unfortunately the league is represented by Lockhart/Gardner nemesis Louis Canning, who never goes down without a good fight. Without enough money to make a down payment on her old house, Alicia begins to take Canning's job offer overtures much more seriously. Things heat up between Diane and process server Jack Copeland. When Will's old girlfriend Tammy comes back to cover the hockey trial, Alicia realizes that she wronged Tammy in the same way that Kalinda wronged her.
65	19	"Blue Ribbon Panel"	Rosemary Rodriguez	Story by : Courtney Kemp Agboh; Teleplay by : Robert King & Michelle King	March 25, 2012	9.77
Diane scrambles to keep the firm's partners placated while they attempt to fill the power vacuum created by Will's suspension, She delegates one of her responsibilities – serving on a blue-ribbon panel that is investigating alleged police misconduct – to Alicia. The case involves a police officer who shot and killed a man on a subway platform. When Alicia begins to suspect that the other members of the panel are unwilling to get to the bottom of what actually happened, Alicia goes toe-to-toe with some of the most influential judges and politicians in Chicago to find the truth. Kalinda's tax audit takes a turn for the personal as she learns the motivation behind the IRS investigation may be about more than money. When Alicia's offer on her old house is rejected, she relives both pleasant and painful memories of her old life with Peter in the process of writing a letter to the seller in the hopes of changing their mind.
66	20	"Pants on Fire"	Roxann Dawson	Ted Humphrey	April 15, 2012	10.16
Alicia and Diane represent one of a trio of girls who were convicted of murder at a summer camp five years ago. Recently, it was discovered that the crime lab mishandled the DNA evidence, and a judge has overturned their sentence pending a new trial. Not wanting to face a wrongful conviction lawsuit, the state has offered the girls an Alford plea – they can go free and continue to maintain their innocence but must all sign a statement admitting that the evidence would have resulted in their conviction. While the girls weigh their options, Alicia and Kalinda work to try to prove the girls' innocence before the window to accept the Alford plea runs out. Mike Kresteva, who had headed the blue-ribbon panel on police misconduct, kicks off his candidacy for the governorship of Illinois by lying about his interaction with Alicia that makes Peter look bad. Infuriated, Alicia starts to realize that she really does want Peter to run. She and Jackie duel over their both trying to buy the old family house.
67	21	"The Penalty Box"	Michael Zinberg	Story by : Julia Wolfe; Teleplay by : Robert King & Michelle King & Ted Humphrey	April 22, 2012	10.42
Alicia and Diane are put in the odd position of representing a judge, the honorable Richard Cuesta, who has been accused of misconduct in a murder trial he handled for the state as a prosecutor twenty years earlier. New DNA evidence has overturned the conviction and Cuesta faces removal from the bench if he is found guilty. With Cuesta backed against a wall, the Lockhart/Gardner team realizes that they must stretch the truth to mount their best defense. As tensions rise, Alicia and Diane realize that Judge Cuesta's adherence to the truth might make him his own worst enemy. When FBI agent Lana Delaney approaches LeMond Bishop, the drug dealer blames Kalinda for the federal attention – an accusation that might have grave consequences, given Bishop's character. As the firm's new named partner Howard Lyman grows increasingly erratic, Will and Diane discuss hiring a new litigator. After two years in the state's attorney's office, Cary Agos returns to his old home at Lockhart/Gardner.
68	22	"The Dream Team"	Robert King	Corinne Brinkerhoff & Meredith Averill	April 29, 2012	9.97
On the heels of a huge win against Louis Canning and a pharmaceutical company, Will and Diane are sent scrambling when Canning teams up with Patti Nyholm in a suit against the firm for fraud and malicious prosecution. When issues from Will's bribery investigation are raised yet again, it appears that Lockhart/Gardner's two old nemeses have a new source of outside information – and they are admittedly trying to use it to bankrupt the firm. As Peter temporarily moves back into the old house, Alicia begins to wonder what her role in the family is becoming. Her renewed friendship with Kalinda hits a snag when Alicia accidentally unearths a dangerous loose end from Kalinda's past.

== Reception ==
The review aggregator website Rotten Tomatoes reports an approval rating for the season of 95% based on 21 reviews. The website's consensus reads, "Controversial topics make for controversial viewing, but thankfully The Good Wife's strong characters and storytelling are up to the task."

== Awards and nominations ==
=== Primetime Emmy Awards ===
- Nomination for Outstanding Lead Actress in a Drama Series (Julianna Margulies for "Parenting Made Easy")
- Nomination for Outstanding Supporting Actress in a Drama Series (Christine Baranski for "Alienation of Affection")
- Nomination for Outstanding Supporting Actress in a Drama Series (Archie Panjabi for "The Dream Team")
- Nomination for Outstanding Guest Actor in a Drama Series (Dylan Baker for "Marthas and Caitlins")
- Nomination for Outstanding Guest Actor in a Drama Series (Michael J. Fox for "Parenting Made Easy")
- Won for Outstanding Guest Actress in a Drama Series (Martha Plimpton for "The Dream Team")
- Nomination for Outstanding Casting for a Drama Series (Mark Saks)

== Ratings ==
Episode number	Title	Original airing	Rating	Share	Rating/share (18–49)	Total viewers (in millions)	Rank per week	Note
47 (3-01)	"A New Day"	September 25, 2011	6.9	10	2.2	10.660	#29	
48 (3-02)	"The Death Zone"	October 2, 2011	7.0	10	2.2	11.080	#23	
49 (3-03)	"Get a Room"	October 9, 2011	6.9	10	2.1	10.280	#26	
50 (3-04)	"Feeding the Rat"	October 16, 2011	6.5	10	2.1	10.330	#27	
51 (3-05)	"Marthas and Caitlins"	October 23, 2011	6.3	9	2.0	9.770	#32	
52 (3-06)	"Affairs of State"	October 30, 2011	6.5	9	2.0	10.600	#28	
53 (3-07)	"Executive Order 13224"	November 6, 2011	5.8	8	2.0	9.070	#35	
54 (3-08)	"Death Row Tip"	November 13, 2011	6.5	9	2.0	10.074	#27	
55 (3-09)	"Whiskey Tango Foxtrot"	November 20, 2011	6.2	9	1.9	9.790	#28	
56 (3-10)	"Parenting Made Easy"	December 4, 2011	6.4	9	1.9	9.938	#16	
57 (3-11)	"What Went Wrong"	December 11, 2011	7.4	11	2.2	11.560	#8	
58 (3-12)	"Alienation of Affection"	January 8, 2012	7.5	11	2.7	11.647	#11	
59 (3-13)	"Bitcoin for Dummies"	January 15, 2012	6.0	9	2.0	9.450	#20	
60 (3-14)	"Another Ham Sandwich"	January 29, 2012	7.2	11	2.2	11.083	#13	
61 (3-15)	"Live from Damascus"	February 19, 2012	6.0	9	2.1	9.730	#24	
62 (3-16)	"After the Fall"	March 4, 2012	6.3	9	1.9	9.830	#23	
63 (3-17)	"Long Way Home"	March 11, 2012	6.4	10	1.7	9.884	#15	
64 (3-18)	"Gloves Come Off"	March 18, 2012	5.9	9	1.9	9.579	#14	
65 (3-19)	"Blue Ribbon Panel"	March 25, 2012	6.5	10	1.9	9.774	#16	
66 (3-20)	"Pants on Fire"	April 15, 2012	6.6	10	1.8	10.161	#14	
67 (3-21)	"The Penalty Box"	April 22, 2012	6.7	10	1.9	10.422	#10	
68 (3-22)	"The Dream Team"	April 29, 2012	6.4	10	1.7	9.970	#13	
