= The Grid (TV serial) =

- Created by: Tracey Alexander; Ken Friedman
- Directed by: Mikael Salomon
- Starring: Dylan McDermott; Julianna Margulies; Tom Skerritt; Piter Marek; Bernard Hill; Jemma Redgrave; James Remar; Alki David; Barna Moricz; Silas Carson
- Composer: Ramin Djawadi
- Countries of origin: United States; United Kingdom
- Original language: English
- No. of series: 1
- No. of episodes: 6

Production
- Executive producers: Tracey Alexander; Brian Eastman
- Running time: 44 minutes
- Production companies: Groveland Pictures; Carnival Films; Fox Television Studios

Original release
- Network: TNT (United States); BBC Two (United Kingdom)
- Release: 19 July – 9 August 2004

The Grid is a 2004 television drama serial co-produced by the BBC, Fox TV Studios and Carnival Films. It starred Dylan McDermott and Julianna Margulies. It aired on TNT in the US and on BBC Two in the UK over three consecutive nights and is available on DVD in the UK, United States and Australia. It also aired on Seven HD in Australia in 2007.

== Premise ==
The series follows an international Counter-Terrorism team whose purpose is to combat terrorism; the series focuses on the team's mission to disrupt a terrorist cell bent on destroying the world's economic foundations. The team is assembled following an incident in which a failed Sarin attack in London leaves several terrorists and innocents dead. The team is composed of: Maren Jackson, an administrator for the National Security Council; Max Canary, SAC of the FBI's Joint Terrorism Task Force (JTTF); and Raza Michaels, an expert on Middle Eastern culture who works for the CIA; in addition, the American team works with two British Intelligence agents, senior field agent Derek Jennings of MI5 and mid-level administrator Emily Tuthill of MI6. Maren Jackson must fight to keep the team together, when they are misled by the terrorists and evacuate Manhattan's subways under a false alarm.

Maren had created the team specifically to cut through red tape and encourage inter-agency cooperation, but she is stymied by Acton Sandman, the CIA's Assistant Director for Counter Terrorism, who believes that he should be leader of the team, and the CIA should be in charge of its operation. To manipulate the situation, Sandman puts political pressure on Raza, and eventually fires him when Raza remains loyal to Maren.

When it becomes evident that there is an imminent threat Maren Jackson and Acton Sandman put their differences aside and work together to prevent the terrorist cell from striking. During the course of the operation Emily Tuthill and Raza Michaels become a couple, and she is distraught when tragedy befalls Raza in Syria when trying to talk down a group of children who had been coerced by the cell leader to martyr themselves. The lives of some of the team are changed forever following the successful operation. Maren Jackson is sworn in as the new National Security Advisor. Emily Tuthill resigns from MI6 after nearly killing Yussef Nasseriah, the terrorist cell leader, following the death of Raza, while Max Canary, Acton Sandman and Derek Jennings return to work at their various agencies.

== Cast ==
- Dylan McDermott as Max Canary: Special Agent in Charge of the FBI's New York City JTTF, member of Maren Jackson's team.
- Julianna Margulies as Maren Jackson: NSA Operative who assembles and leads an international Counter-Terrorism Team.
- Tom Skerritt as Acton Sandman: CIA's Assistant Director for Counter Terrorist Operations; adversary of Maren Jackson.
- Piter Marek as Raza Michaels: CIA Analyst and key member of Maren Jackson's team. His position on Maren's team puts him at odd with his boss, Acton Sandman.
- Bernard Hill as Derek Jennings: Head of MI5's Counter Terrorist Operations, and a member of Maren Jackson's team.
- Jemma Redgrave as Emily Tuthill: Head of MI6's Foreign Counter Terrorist Operations, and a member of Maren Jackson's team.
- James Remar as Hudson Benoit: international businessman and love interest of Maren Jackson.
- Alki David as Yussef Nasseriah: Leader of the terrorist cell.
- Barna Moricz as Kaz Moore: son of a Russian immigrant and member of Yussef Nasseriah's cell.
- Silas Carson as Dr. Raghib Mutar: A Saudi doctor who is an old friend of Yussef Nasseriah and becomes a member of his cell.
- Andy Velasquez as Foud al Bansour: Saudi Arabia's ambassador to the United States.

== Episodes ==
The show had 6 episodes however when originally aired on TNT Episodes 1 & 2 aired as one episode as did Episodes 5 & 6.

No.	Title	Directed by	Written by	Original release date
1	"Hour One"	Mikael Salomon	Tracey Alexander and Ken Friedman	19 July 2004
2	"Hour Two"	Mikael Salomon	Tracey Alexander and Ken Friedman	19 July 2004
3	"Hour Three"	Mikael Salomon	Tracey Alexander and Ken Friedman	26 July 2004
4	"Hour Four"	Mikael Salomon	Tracey Alexander and Ken Friedman	2 August 2004
5	"Hour Five"	Mikael Salomon	Tracey Alexander and Ken Friedman	9 August 2004
6	"Hour Six"	Mikael Salomon	Tracey Alexander and Ken Friedman	9 August 2004

== Home media ==
DVD release
Set details				Special features
				Bonus featurettes: Decoding the Grid; VFX: Secrets of the Grid; Racing Against Time; Scene-specific commentaries by Dylan McDermott and Julianna Margulies; 13 deleted scenes; Commentary; Hours 3 & 4 by Mikael Salomon and Tracey Alexander
	Canada (North America)	United Kingdom	Australia	Bonus featurettes: Decoding the Grid; VFX: Secrets of the Grid; Racing Against Time; Scene-specific commentaries by Dylan McDermott and Julianna Margulies; 13 deleted scenes; Commentary; Hours 3 & 4 by Mikael Salomon and Tracey Alexander
Episodes	6	6	6	Bonus featurettes: Decoding the Grid; VFX: Secrets of the Grid; Racing Against Time; Scene-specific commentaries by Dylan McDermott and Julianna Margulies; 13 deleted scenes; Commentary; Hours 3 & 4 by Mikael Salomon and Tracey Alexander
Aspect ratio	1.78:1	1.78:1	1.78:1	Bonus featurettes: Decoding the Grid; VFX: Secrets of the Grid; Racing Against Time; Scene-specific commentaries by Dylan McDermott and Julianna Margulies; 13 deleted scenes; Commentary; Hours 3 & 4 by Mikael Salomon and Tracey Alexander
Running time	265 mins	270 mins	266 mins	Bonus featurettes: Decoding the Grid; VFX: Secrets of the Grid; Racing Against Time; Scene-specific commentaries by Dylan McDermott and Julianna Margulies; 13 deleted scenes; Commentary; Hours 3 & 4 by Mikael Salomon and Tracey Alexander
Audio	Dolby Digital 5.1	Dolby Digital 5.1	Dolby Digital 5.1	Bonus featurettes: Decoding the Grid; VFX: Secrets of the Grid; Racing Against Time; Scene-specific commentaries by Dylan McDermott and Julianna Margulies; 13 deleted scenes; Commentary; Hours 3 & 4 by Mikael Salomon and Tracey Alexander
Subtitles	English, Spanish, French	English	English	Bonus featurettes: Decoding the Grid; VFX: Secrets of the Grid; Racing Against Time; Scene-specific commentaries by Dylan McDermott and Julianna Margulies; 13 deleted scenes; Commentary; Hours 3 & 4 by Mikael Salomon and Tracey Alexander
No. of discs	2	2	2	Bonus featurettes: Decoding the Grid; VFX: Secrets of the Grid; Racing Against Time; Scene-specific commentaries by Dylan McDermott and Julianna Margulies; 13 deleted scenes; Commentary; Hours 3 & 4 by Mikael Salomon and Tracey Alexander
Region(s)	1 (NTSC)	2 (PAL)	4 (PAL)	Bonus featurettes: Decoding the Grid; VFX: Secrets of the Grid; Racing Against Time; Scene-specific commentaries by Dylan McDermott and Julianna Margulies; 13 deleted scenes; Commentary; Hours 3 & 4 by Mikael Salomon and Tracey Alexander
Rating	Not rated	15	M	Bonus featurettes: Decoding the Grid; VFX: Secrets of the Grid; Racing Against Time; Scene-specific commentaries by Dylan McDermott and Julianna Margulies; 13 deleted scenes; Commentary; Hours 3 & 4 by Mikael Salomon and Tracey Alexander
Release dates	8 February 2005	14 March 2005	6 August 2006	Bonus featurettes: Decoding the Grid; VFX: Secrets of the Grid; Racing Against Time; Scene-specific commentaries by Dylan McDermott and Julianna Margulies; 13 deleted scenes; Commentary; Hours 3 & 4 by Mikael Salomon and Tracey Alexander

== Awards and nominations ==
Year	Association	Category	Nominee(s)	Result
2005	Primetime Emmy Awards	Outstanding Sound Editing for a Miniseries, Movie or a Special for (one Hour) for the episode "Part IV"	Mark Friedgen; Devon Heffley Curry; Bob Costanza; Mike Dickeson; Gary Macheel; Tom Trafalski; Mark Steele	Nominated
