= The Good Wife season 2 =

The Good Wife
- Season 2
- Season 2 U.S. DVD cover
- Starring: Julianna Margulies; Matt Czuchry; Archie Panjabi; Graham Phillips; Makenzie Vega; Alan Cumming; Josh Charles; Christine Baranski
- No. of episodes: 23

Release
- Original network: CBS
- Original release: September 28, 2010 – May 17, 2011

Season chronology
- ← Previous; Season 1 Next → Season 3

The second season of The Good Wife began airing on September 28, 2010, and concluded on May 17, 2011.

== Premise ==
The series focuses on Alicia Florrick, whose husband Peter, the former Cook County, Illinois State's Attorney, has been jailed following a notorious political corruption and sex scandal. After having spent the previous thirteen years as a stay-at-home mother, Alicia returns to the workforce as a litigator to provide for her two children.

The second season follows Alicia, now a full-time employee at Lockhart & Gardner, while still juggling her private life and her professional life. Most of the plot focuses on the arrival of Derrick Bond, who becomes a partner at the firm, changing the lives of the characters forever. As Alicia continues her career and her tame flirtations with Will Gardner, her husband Peter Florrick tries to regain his post as district attorney. At the end of the season, most of the storylines come to a head as Alicia's relationship with private investigator Kalinda Sharma is put to the test.

== Cast ==
=== Main ===
- Julianna Margulies as Alicia Florrick
- Matt Czuchry as Cary Agos
- Archie Panjabi as Kalinda Sharma
- Makenzie Vega as Grace Florrick
- Graham Phillips as Zach Florrick
- Alan Cumming as Eli Gold
- Josh Charles as Will Gardner
- Christine Baranski as Diane Lockhart

=== Recurring ===
- Chris Noth as Peter Florrick
- Scott Porter as Blake Calamar
- Michael Ealy as Derrick Bond
- Mary Beth Peil as Jackie Florrick
- Titus Welliver as Glenn Childs
- Anika Noni Rose as Wendy Scott-Carr
- Elizabeth Reaser as Tammy Linnata
- Zach Grenier as David Lee
- Mike Pniewski as Frank Landau
- Tim Guinee as Andrew Wiley
- Dreama Walker as Becca
- Michael Boatman as Julius Cain
- Chris Butler as Matan Brody
- Renee Elise Goldsberry as Geneva Pine
- Dallas Roberts as Owen Cavanaugh
- Felix Solis as Kevin Rodriguez
- Skipp Sudduth as Jim Moody
- America Ferrera as Natalie Flores
- Michael J. Fox as Louis Canning
- Mike Colter as Lemond Bishop
- Sonequa Martin-Green as Courtney Wells
- Mamie Gummer as Nancy Crozier
- Denis O'Hare as Charles Abernathy
- Ana Gasteyer as Patrice Lessner
- Rita Wilson as Viola Walsh

=== Guest ===
- Gary Cole as Kurt McVeigh
- Martha Plimpton as Patti Nyholm
- Jill Flint as Lana Delaney
- Kevin Conway as Jonas Stern
- Jerry Adler as Howard Lyman
- John Benjamin Hickey as Neil Gross
- Miranda Cosgrove as Sloan Burchfield
- Emily Kinney as Milla Burchfield
- David Paymer as Richard Cuesta
- Kelli Giddish as Sophia Russo
- Rachel Brosnahan as Caitlin Fenton
- Norbert Leo Butz as Mr. Medina
- Susan Misner as Simone Canning
- Jane Alexander as Suzanne Morris
- Jerry Stiller as Felix Afterman
- Pablo Schreiber as Gregory Mars
- Bill Irwin as Fred Medkiff
- Sophina Brown as Katrina Bishop
- Sarah Silverman as Stephanie Engler
- Christian Pedersen as Scott Bauer

== Episodes ==
No. overall	No. in season	Title	Directed by	Written by	Original release date	US viewers (millions)
24	1	"Taking Control"	Félix Alcalá	Robert King & Michelle King	September 28, 2010	12.84
Picking up from the season one finale, Alicia is about to join Peter on the dais as Will calls. Eli Gold grabs the phone and gets Alicia to take Peter's hand. Will leaves two messages: the first saying he understands they should just drop it, then the second saying that he loves her, and he's not dropping this. Eli deletes the second message. Before they have a chance to settle things, Will gets caught up in the law firm's merger and has to deal with the new partner, Derrick Bond. In court, Alicia is appointed as a counselor to an accused murderer who insists on defending himself.
25	2	"Double Jeopardy"	Dean Parisot	Ted Humphrey	October 5, 2010	12.76
Dissatisfied that Alicia wins a not guilty verdict for a young Army reservist accused of murdering his wife, Cary arranges to have the case re-tried in military court. In military court, the trial procedures are different and the law is presented differently, hindering Alicia. But Alicia has a plan and calls Cary to the stand as a witness as a way of producing evidence that gives a break in the case and saves her client. Meanwhile as the campaign for state's attorney kicks into full gear, Childs resorts to dirty tricks in an effort to mar Peter's reputation.
26	3	"Breaking Fast"	James Whitmore Jr.	Corinne Brinkerhoff	October 12, 2010	11.82
For the first time, Lockhart, Gardner, & Bond go squarely on the offensive against the prosecutors, filing a multimillion-dollar malicious prosecution suit against the state's attorney's office for ruining an innocent defendant's life. Childs is desperate to defend his department's decisions while covering himself; Diane and Will debate how to best utilize Alicia in a case against her husband's political opponent; and Kalinda and Cary go head-to-head in trying to determine the true culprit's identity. All of the maneuvering builds to one explosive conflict between Alicia and Glenn Childs that could make or break the case — and ultimately, the campaign.
27	4	"Cleaning House"	Rosemary Rodriguez	Robert King & Michelle King	October 19, 2010	12.17
Alicia once again faces the impossibly sweet young Nancy Crozier, only this time she's her co-counsel and – supposedly – on the same side of the case. Although Alicia is prepared for her innocent-with-a-dagger routine, it was originally thought that it could work toward their common goal: defending their linked clients in a civil suit. But when Nancy proves as dangerous as the opposition, Alicia fights on two fronts and ultimately outmaneuvers Nancy to protect her own client.
28	5	"VIP Treatment"	Michael Zinberg	Robert King & Michelle King	October 26, 2010	12.59
This episode begins where the last one ended, with young assistant state's attorney Wendy Scott-Carr announcing her intention to run for state's attorney at a gala dinner in front of Alicia, Peter, and the Lockhart, Gardner and Bond partners. While Peter and Eli try to figure out what this means for their campaign, Alicia is called back to the firm on an urgent matter. A massage therapist claims that a revered humanitarian and women's rights activist sexually assaulted her. Will gets into a scuffle with the humanitarian's lawyer. In the next few hours, the firm investigates the massage therapist and mulls over her potential case. The humanitarian offers to endorse Peter in return for Alicia's firm backing off the case; Peter refuses but gets the endorsement anyway. Finally, the therapist decides that she doesn't want exposure and decides not to sue.
29	6	"Poisoned Pill"	Peter O'Fallon	Keith Eisner	November 9, 2010	12.33
The firm crosses swords with a brilliant disabled attorney named Louis Canning who is cynically deployed by a desperate pharmaceutical company to battle the claim that their new billion-dollar antidepressant caused the grisly murder-suicide of the firm's client's parents. Caitlin Fenton is the plaintiff in the test case. Winning it would open the door for tens of millions of dollars in class action money. In the event of loss, many other victims will be unable to collect any compensation for the deaths of their loved ones.
30	7	"Bad Girls"	Jim McKay	Courtney Kemp Agboh	November 16, 2010	11.74
After receiving a critical peer review from new partner Derrick Bond, Alicia is saddled with the DUI case of teen star Sloan Burchfield, who apparently ran her Escalade into a pole after a night of underage drinking. While Alicia is able to convince the judge of Sloan's innocence in this matter, Cary drops a bombshell before the case is closed: Yasmine Morgan, another club-goer on that night, is accusing Sloan of attempted murder.
31	8	"On Tap"	Roxann Dawson	Leonard Dick	November 23, 2010	10.03
The firm represents Matthew Wade, an alderman who has been indicted for taking campaign contributions in exchange for getting a mosque built on the site of an abandoned housing project. To complicate matters further, the money came from now-deceased campaign bundler Royce Crombie, who allegedly had ties to Islamic extremists. Wade is being charged with aiding and abetting a terrorist organization.
32	9	"Nine Hours"	Julie Hébert	Meredith Averill	December 14, 2010	11.84
Ten years ago, Carter Wright was accused of starting a fire that killed his ex-wife. He's been on death row ever since. The firm is handling his death sentence appeal when it gets a cryptic call about the case from a courthouse clerk, and they realize that something must have been overlooked by his previous counsel. They have less than eight hours before the deadline to file a modified appeal.
33	10	"Breaking Up"	Félix Alcalá	Courtney Kemp Agboh	January 11, 2011	12.29
When drugs are found in the possession of wealthy student Jonathan Murphy and his working class girlfriend Alexis Symanski, Jonathan's father calls in the law firm. But the case gets more complex when the drugs are found to have come from a pharmacy where the clerk was murdered. Jonathan and Alexis finger a man in a photo line-up as the guy who sold them the drugs, but it turns out the exercise was a trap: the man's been dead for four years. Jonathan and Alexis have just become the primary suspects in Cary's murder investigation.
34	11	"Two Courts"	Tom DiCillo	Ted Humphrey	January 18, 2011	11.43
While defending Scott Bauer, an internet spam distributor accused of murdering his father, Alicia and Will are stymied by hostile judge Edward Weldon due to an altercation he had with Will on the basketball court. To make matters worse, the prosecution was able to get a picture entered into evidence that showed Scott dressed in a Nazi SS uniform for a WWII war reenactment. Between the judge's biased rulings and the jury's dislike of Bauer's profession and hobby, Alicia and Will feel their case slipping away.
35	12	"Silly Season"	Rosemary Rodriguez	Corinne Brinkerhoff	February 1, 2011	12.14
As Cary and Alicia go head-to-head again in a prison murder case, Cary uncovers an unlikely connection between the accused and one of Bond's clients. Meanwhile, Glenn Childs and Wendy Scott-Carr join forces after Peter's campaign is discovered apparently race-baiting the electorate. In order to get Peter to stop, Scott-Carr threatens to reveal that Zach and his friend Becca had sex, resulting in Becca getting a secret abortion. The threat of a new scandal rocks both the campaign and the Florrick household.
36	13	"Real Deal"	Michael Zinberg	Keith Eisner	February 8, 2011	11.86
Alicia takes on a class-action lawsuit and tries to round up more signatures for the case in competition with shrewd but unscrupulous lawyer Louis Canning. Kalinda discovers a key-tracking software has been installed on Alicia's computer, which suggests that Canning is spying on Alicia. However, they find that Derrick Bond seems to be getting information from the tracking. This leads to Will and Diane resolving to oust Bond. Meanwhile, Bond brings in a super PAC as a client.
37	14	"Net Worth"	Brooke Kennedy	Meredith Averill	February 15, 2011	11.43
Will takes on the defamation case of wunderkind internet billionaire Patric Edelstein, the 25-year-old founder of Sleuth.com. Edelstein is suing the makers of a biopic that he claims is defaming him, and while Will knows the case will be a tough sell, he also knows that he can milk this "cash cow" for hundreds of billable hours. After meeting with Edelstein in the deposition, however, Will begins believing in him. After a talk with Honeycutt, the cynical lawyer representing the film studio, Will resolves to try and win the long-shot defamation case instead of just trying to milk it for the cash. While meeting with the screenwriter, though, Will gets a better idea: challenging on the basis of Patric's right to publicity. If he claims that the studio is usurping Patric's right to control his own publicity, he can get a settlement without proving the much-more-difficult defamation claim.
38	15	"Silver Bullet"	Jim McKay	Steve Lichtman	February 22, 2011	11.86
Kurt McVeigh, the right-wing ballistics expert with whom Diane has an on-again off-again relationship, is on trial for testimony he gave in a murder trial. Pablo Beltran, the accused cop killer in that case, was sent to prison partially based on McVeigh's testimony. When extreme misconduct by the DNA lab caused Beltran to go free, however, he decided to go after McVeigh knowing that a judgment against the expert would end the latter's career. In the campaign for state's attorney, as Eli decides how best to use a "Nannygate"-style political bombshell that might cripple Wendy Scott-Carr's campaign. Eli appears to be sympathetic to the nanny. Alicia helps Diane defend McVeigh and piece together the truth about Beltran's shooting. McVeigh proposes to Diane, but she turns him down.
39	16	"Great Firewall"	Nelson McCormick	Leonard Dick	March 1, 2011	11.38
LGB is suing a social networking website on behalf Shen Yuan, a Chinese dissident who was jailed and tortured for five years by the Chinese government. Shen claims that the website failed to protect his anonymity when it turned his IP address over to the government. Alicia and Will know that if they can get a large enough settlement, the company will stop cooperating with the Chinese and they can help prevent the incarceration of future activists. But when Alicia sees Internet billionaire Patric Edelstein in the firm's office, she begins to suspect that the firm has an ulterior motive for taking Shen's case. Peter finds a silver bullet that might drive Glenn Childs from the campaign for good, Will and Diane attempt to wrestle control of the firm away from Bond once and for all.
40	17	"Ham Sandwich"	Griffin Dunne	Keith Eisner	March 22, 2011	11.70
When drug kingpin LeMond Bishop's wife leaves him, the firm represents him in a series of increasingly nasty divorce proceedings. Bishop is intent on trying to reconcile with the woman he still loves, but she is resolute: he cheated on her, and now he has to pay. Alicia and Will must convince the court that their client is fit to be a father despite his alleged underworld dealings or he could lose his family for good. Meanwhile, Kalinda is subpoenaed by a grand jury to answer for a variety of crimes she's supposedly committed in the past. But is Glenn Childs actually after Kalinda, or is he really trying to take down Alicia and the firm? Kalinda meets with rival investigator Blake Calamar. He teases her that he knows her secret and reveals that Kalinda slept with Peter in exchange for helping her with a situation.
41	18	"Killer Song"	James Whitmore Jr.	Karen Hall	March 29, 2011	10.16
Jarvis Bowes has spent the last 30 years in a psychiatric hospital after being convicted for the rape and murder of Malory Cerone. While institutionalized, he wrote a song which was covered by a pop band and has recently hit the top of the charts. Now Alicia and Lockhart/Gardner are helping Cerone's daughter sue Bowes for the proceeds from the song, claiming he wrote it about killing Malory Cerone. But when Alicia looks into Bowes' crime, she finds that the roots of the song may be even more disturbing than had been initially thought. Meanwhile Alicia and Diane help Eli attempt to secure citizenship for Natalie Flores, but their case hits a snag when Flores' father is wrongfully arrested and threatened with deportation.
42	19	"Wrongful Termination"	Phil Abraham	Ted Humphrey	April 5, 2011	10.82
Alicia and the firm take on a class action suit against GoView, a video-on-demand company that created working conditions so miserable that several employees committed suicide. Opposing counsel is once again Louis Canning, this time taking the case over from the firm's former partner now turned rival Jonas Stern. Stern had been on the verge of settling, but Canning insists on a trial. When Alicia finds an internal memo proving that GoView looted the employee pension fund, they are stuck with a case that is slowly becoming unwinnable and a piece of evidence that would leave their class with nothing if it came to light.
43	20	"Foreign Affairs"	Frederick E.O. Toye	Meredith Averill	April 12, 2011	11.05
Lockhart/Gardner represents a small drilling contractor in a contract dispute against a major oil conglomerate. Things seem straightforward at first, but quickly get out of hand when Venezuelan dictator Hugo Chávez nationalizes the drilling company and takes over the case. Suddenly, Lockhard/Gardner is forced to cater to the dictator's whims, including taking orders from an aging actor who played a famous lawyer on television. Meanwhile, Peter and Wendi Scott-Carr are neck-and-neck in the polls leading up to Election Day. In order to win, Eli tells Alicia that she must enter the fray and show her support for Peter in a televised interview.
44	21	"In Sickness"	Félix Alcalá	Story by : Steve Lichtman; Teleplay by : Robert King & Michelle King	May 3, 2011	12.38
Lockhart/Gardner nemesis Patti Nyholm returns, this time defending a hospital in a liver transplant case. A woman with only weeks to live has been bumped from the transplant list, and the firm only has days to reverse the hospital's decision before the liver goes to someone else. The case takes an unexpected turn when Nyholm turns the tables – she's been wrongfully terminated by her firm allegedly due to her pregnancy, and she wants to hire Will and Alicia to take her case. But can she be trusted? With the revelation of Peter's one-night stand with Kalinda, Alicia takes action, throwing Peter out of their home, and deals with the emotional fallout from Peter, their children, and her mother-in-law Jackie.
45	22	"Getting Off"	Roxann Dawson	Leonard Dick	May 10, 2011	11.73
Alicia is assigned to defend a woman who is being sued by a widow whose husband was murdered by someone he met on the defendant's website for adulterers. Once again, Alicia and Will are up against the somewhat ditsy Nancy Crozier. When Crozier's case turns to accusing the website defendant of murder – and Carey Agos takes an all-too-obvious interest in the civil proceedings – Alicia and Will realize they have to change their strategy. At the office, Alicia lays it on the line with Kalinda, who contemplates looking for a job elsewhere.
46	23	"Closing Arguments"	Robert King	Corinne Brinkerhoff	May 17, 2011	12.58
The second season concludes with the firm defending a man accused of murdering a judge. Alicia and Kalinda temporarily put aside their strained relationship to work on the case. Meanwhile, Eli decides to bring his consulting business to Lockhart/Gardner, but Alicia is against the idea.

== Reception ==
The second season of The Good Wife received critical acclaim. The review aggregator website Rotten Tomatoes reports a 100% rating based on 21 reviews. The website's consensus reads, "The Good Wife's sophomore season explores exciting new layers of the show's meticulous mythology." On Metacritic, the second season of the show currently sits at an 89 out of 100, based on eight critics.

== Awards and nominations ==
Primetime Emmy Awards

- Nominated for Outstanding Drama Series
- Won for Outstanding Lead Actress in a Drama Series (Julianna Margulies) (for the episode "In Sickness")
- Nominated for Outstanding Supporting Actor in a Drama Series (Josh Charles) (for the episode "Closing Arguments")
- Nominated for Outstanding Supporting Actor in a Drama Series (Alan Cumming) (for the episode "Silver Bullet")
- Nominated for Outstanding Supporting Actress in a Drama Series (Christine Baranski) (for the episode "Silver Bullet")
- Nominated for Outstanding Supporting Actress in a Drama Series (Archie Panjabi) (for the episode "Getting Off")
- Nominated for Outstanding Guest Actor in a Drama Series (Michael J. Fox) (for the episode "Real Deal")
- Nomination for Outstanding Casting for a Drama Series (Mark Saks)
- Nomination for Primetime Emmy Award for Outstanding Cinematography for a Single-Camera Series (One Hour) (Fred Murphy for "Double Jeopardy")

== Ratings ==
Episode	Title	Air Date	HH Rating	18–49 Rating	Viewers	Rank	Ref
1 (24)	Taking Control	September 28, 2010	8.3	2.5	12.844	#15	
2 (25)	Double Jeopardy	October 5, 2010	8.3	2.5	12.762	#10	
3 (26)	Breaking Fast	October 12, 2010	7.7	2.5	11.815	#17	
4 (27)	Cleaning House	October 19, 2010	7.9	2.6	12.169	#15	
5 (28)	VIP Treatment	October 26, 2010	8.2	2.4	12.588	#18	
6 (29)	Poisoned Pill	November 9, 2010	8.0	2.2	12.327	#16	
7 (30)	Bad Girls	November 16, 2010	7.6	2.2	11.735	#18	
8 (31)	On Tap	November 23, 2010	6.7	2.1	10.030	#16	
9 (32)	Nine Hours	December 14, 2010	7.7	2.2	11.835	#12	
10 (33)	Breaking Up	January 11, 2011	7.8	2.3	12.288	#9	
11 (34)	Two Courts	January 18, 2011	7.6	2.1	11.434	#15	
12 (35)	Silly Season	February 1, 2011	7.7	2.2	12.136	#11	
13 (36)	Real Deal	February 8, 2011	7.6	2.2	11.857	#15	
14 (37)	Net Worth	February 15, 2011	7.5	2.0	11.427	#12	
15 (38)	Silver Bullet	February 22, 2011	7.6	2.0	11.855	#13	
16 (39)	Great Firewall	March 1, 2011	7.4	2.2	11.383	#10	
17 (40)	Ham Sandwich	March 22, 2011	7.7	2.1	11.697	#9	
18 (41)	Killer Song	March 29, 2011	6.7	1.9	10.162	#23	
19 (42)	Wrongful Termination	April 5, 2011	7.1	2.0	10.816	#18	
20 (43)	Foreign Affairs	April 12, 2011	7.4	2.0	11.051	#12	
21 (44)	In Sickness	May 3, 2011	8.0	2.4	12.383	#11	
22 (45)	Getting Off	May 10, 2011	7.7	2.0	11.731	#14	
23 (46)	Closing Arguments	May 17, 2011	8.1	2.4	12.577	#12	

DVR Ratings season 2
