= Julianna Margulies =

American actress (born 1966)

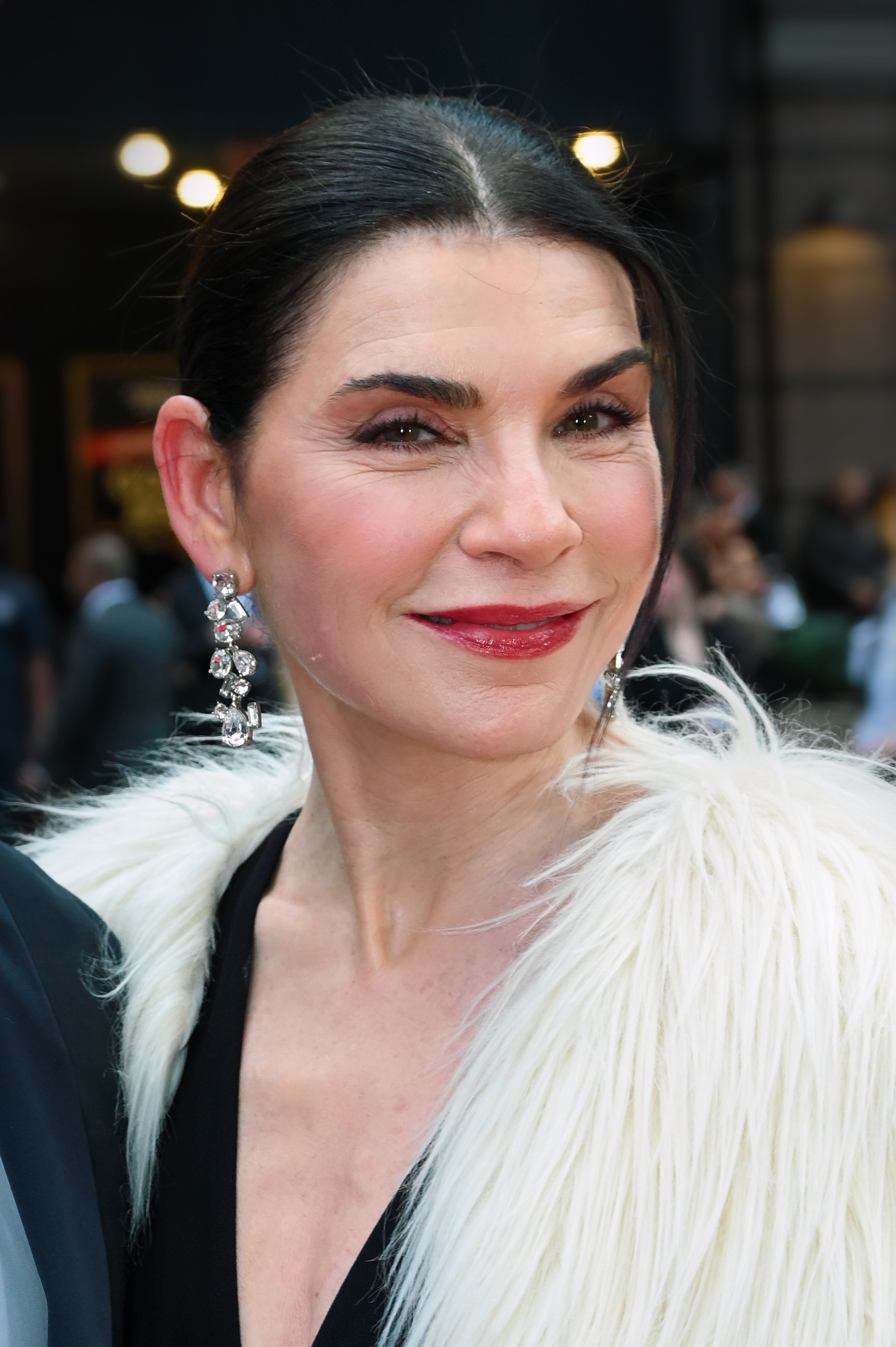
- Margulies in 2025
- Born: June 8, 1966 (age 60); Spring Valley, New York, U.S.
- Education: Sarah Lawrence College
- Occupation: Actress
- Years active: 1991–present
- Spouse: Keith Lieberthal (m. 2007)
- Partner: Ron Eldard (1991–2003)
- Children: 1
- Father: Paul Margulies
- Relatives: Kenneth Lieberthal (father-in-law)
- Awards: Full list

Julianna Margulies (/ˈmɑːrɡʊliːs/; born June 8, 1966) is an American actress. After several small television roles, Margulies received wide recognition for her starring role as Carol Hathaway in the NBC medical drama series ER (1994–2000; 2009), for which she received a Primetime Emmy Award and six Screen Actors Guild Awards, in addition to four Golden Globe Award nominations. In 2009, she took on the lead role of Alicia Florrick in the CBS legal drama series The Good Wife (2009–2016). Her performance garnered critical acclaim, winning an additional two Primetime Emmy Awards, two Screen Actors Guild Awards, a Golden Globe Award, and a Television Critics Association Award.

Margulies also had roles in the TNT miniseries The Mists of Avalon (2001), the HBO crime drama series The Sopranos (2006–2007), the National Geographic miniseries The Hot Zone (2019), and as Laura Peterson in the Apple TV+ drama series The Morning Show (2021–2023).

She starred in the adventure film Dinosaur (2000), the drama film Evelyn (2002), the supernatural horror film Ghost Ship (2002), the action horror film Snakes on a Plane (2006), the comedy drama film City Island (2009), the crime comedy film Stand Up Guys (2012), and the comedy drama film The Upside (2017).

Margulies has received one Golden Globe Award, three Primetime Emmy Awards, and eight Screen Actors Guild Awards, making her the second most awarded woman ever within SAG after Julia Louis-Dreyfus. She is also the recipient of a star on the Hollywood Walk of Fame. In 2015, Time magazine named her one of the 100 most influential people in the world.

== Early life and education ==
Julianna Margulies was born in Spring Valley, New York, the youngest of three daughters. Her mother Francesca (née Gardner) was a ballet dancer and eurythmy teacher. (Note: Margulies states in her memoir Sunshine Girl that her mother's maiden name was Janice Marylin Gardner.) Her father Paul Margulies was a writer, philosopher, and Madison Avenue advertising executive. Her parents were both Jewish, descendants of Ashkenazi Jewish immigrants from Austria, Hungary, Romania, and Russia. They divorced when she was a year old.

In her memoir Sunshine Girl, Margulies wrote that her parents both adhered to the teachings of anthroposophy. Margulies, herself, has said that she does not hold religious beliefs, although she is ethnically Jewish and teaches the traditions to her son. In a 2013 interview, she said, "I would say if I had a religion, it would be gratitude…I love the tradition of Judaism that on Friday nights, Shabbat means 'Goodbye to the workweek; hello to family and the weekend.'"

In her memoir, Margulies also wrote about her difficult, nomadic childhood. She is from New York City, but she moved with her mother to different countries and states throughout her youth, including Sussex, England, and Paris, France. As a result, French was Margulies' first language. She has since lost the ability to speak it fluently.

In the book, Margulies described her childhood as ultimately loving, but unpredictable and unstable. She detailed many emotionally traumatic experiences.

Margulies attended many different schools as a child, including Green Meadow Waldorf School and High Mowing School. She graduated with a degree in art history and English from Sarah Lawrence College, where she appeared in several campus plays. At Sarah Lawrence College, students select three areas of focus for coursework. Margulies focused on art history, English, and theatre. She originally enrolled in college with the goal of becoming a lawyer, like her grandmother, or a psychologist, but fell in love with the craft of acting.

== Career ==
=== 1994–2000: ER ===
Margulies made her feature film debut in Steven Seagal's action film Out for Justice (1991), playing a prostitute. In 1994, Margulies was cast in the pilot episode of the NBC medical drama ER as Carol Hathaway, an emergency care nurse who attempts suicide. Her character was originally intended to die; however, test audiences overwhelmingly wanted her to survive, so the producers changed the plot.

At the time she was offered ER, Margulies had also been offered an extended role on NBC's Homicide: Life on the Street, after a two-episode appearance earlier in the year. George Clooney, who had filmed the pilot episode with Margulies, called her to let her know that he had overheard producers saying that her character might become a series regular. He encouraged her to consider waiting for ER producers to call her and not take another job. Clooney was right, and Margulies accepted the role on ER in 1994.

She remained on the show as a series regular for six seasons until 2000 and returned to the show for one episode during its final season in 2009. She won a Primetime Emmy Award for Outstanding Supporting Actress in a Drama Series in 1994, and was nominated for an Emmy Award every year during her tenure on ER. She was the only series regular cast member to win a Primetime Emmy Award. She was also nominated four times for a Golden Globe Award during the show's tenure.

Originally, Margulies had signed a five-year contract to work on ER. She extended the contract for a sixth year, but made the "very difficult, painful decision" to opt out of another renewal. In 2021, she explained in her memoir, Sunshine Girl, that she had been feeling homesick for New York after spending six years filming the show in Los Angeles. She wanted to return to theatre and take on a leading role in The Mists of Avalon, a miniseries based on the 1983 fantasy novel of the same name, which she had loved as a child.

In 2021, Margulies said during an interview with Michael Imperioli and Steve Schirripa, "I thought, didn't I work six years on a show I loved — I loved being on ER, I was so grateful, and it was a great experience — but didn't I work this hard to be able to do theatre for $235 a week without worrying about my rent?" She explained that, before NBC offered her $27 million to sign on for another two years, she had already helped plan out the conclusion of her character's story arc on the show and mapped out a year's worth of work for herself.

In a New York Times interview with Bill Carter, Margulies shared that another factor in her decision was a desire to protect her ER character, Carol Hathaway, from certain story changes that were happening as the show continued on into later years. She explained that she didn't like how her character became the focus of too much romance whenever she wasn't with George Clooney's character, and that all of the research she had previously done in order to play the character was then undone by certain storylines.

Margulies recalled, "I'll never forget, there was a line [in the script] where [my character] says, 'I had to share a bathroom with seven sisters.' I was like, guys, I've been playing her as an only child for six years…I had actually done research on what it's like to be an only child. I was starting to feel very sad about a character I loved so much. It started to become very clear to me that without George, my character was just going to be the liaison to flashy sort of bits of things instead of one fluent, cognizant thought and I felt sad about it."

Had Margulies accepted the $27 million contract for a seventh and eighth year of ER, it would have made her one of the highest paid women on television. The actress said that she received intense, hurtful backlash for her decision to ultimately leave ER, but was "doing what fed me, as an actor," she said in 2021. "And keeping my promises to playwrights and directors who I'd already made a commitment to." She also said that she wanted to move on as an actress:

I had a year's worth of work waiting and a mortgage completely paid at age 32. I was under no illusion that I was going to be some big movie star. My dad said, 'If you got hit by a bus tomorrow, were you living your life truthfully, or were you waiting to get rich?' If I died and my soul started leaving my body, would I be looking down going, 'You idiot. You could have gone to Prague, you could have been on Broadway'? Those are the things I wanted to do.

In an interview with TV Guide, she further explained, "I felt like I had a great character and I did as much as I could do with her, but I was feeling bored. I wasn't excited about the work and I certainly didn't want to go out with a bomb, but as an inspiration."

=== 2000–2009 ===
In February 2000, Margulies hosted an episode of the NBC late-night sketch series Saturday Night Live. She brought on ER co-star Noah Wyle for one of the show's sketches.

After leaving ER as a series regular, Margulies worked on stage and screen. On stage, she appeared in a MCC Theater production of Kate Robin's Intrigue With Faye, a Lincoln Center production of Jon Robin Baitz's Ten Unknowns, and The Vagina Monologues.

Her work after ER included the 2002 films Evelyn, with Pierce Brosnan, and Ghost Ship, with Gabriel Byrne and Ron Eldard. She starred as Morgaine, the protagonist and narrator of the TNT miniseries The Mists of Avalon (2001) and participated in the documentary film Searching for Debra Winger (2002).

In 2004, she guest-starred in a two-episode arc in season four of the hit NBC comedy series Scrubs as Neena Broderick, an unscrupulous lawyer who sues Turk and has a brief sexual relationship with J.D. That same year, she starred in another miniseries on TNT, The Grid. In April 2006, she appeared in four episodes of the sixth season of the HBO crime drama series The Sopranos, portraying realtor Julianna Skiff. In August 2006, she appeared alongside Samuel L. Jackson in the action film Snakes on a Plane, as flight attendant Claire Miller. In December 2006, she played Jennifer Bloom in the Syfy Channel miniseries The Lost Room.

In 2006, Margulies served as a narrator for the 2006 television documentary film The Armenian Genocide, broadcast by PBS to spread awareness of the killing of one million Armenians during World War I.

In an August 2006 interview with tvguide.com, Margulies said she was close to accepting an offer to return to ER for a four-episode arc, with Noah Wyle, that filmed in Hawaii during the 2005/06 season. However, she decided against it at the last minute. "I left on very good terms with [ER exec producer] John Wells, and every year they ask me back and I love that they do," she told TV Guide in 2006. "So, at the last minute, I went, 'John, thank you and keep asking, because you never know, but no.'"

Margulies was invited to return during ER's final season. The actress hesitated, saying she felt like she left Carol Hathaway in the perfect place and could not imagine bettering her departure episode, but Margulies did return to ER for one more episode during its 15th and final season. In a 2013 interview, she said of her appearance, "I called George up and said, 'If you do it, I'll do it.' We were both very aware we had careers because of that show, and we also loved those characters. I remember walking on to the Warner Bros. lot, and they asked for my ID. I used to have my picture on the wall there. It was a little surreal, but a lovely way to come full circle."

Margulies had a minor role in the film The Darwin Awards (2007). In 2008, Margulies starred in the legal series Canterbury's Law, a Fox mid-season replacement show. She played the title character, Elizabeth Canterbury, a lawyer. She was also credited as a producer of the show. The series was severely affected by the 2007–2008 Writers Guild of America strike; it was cancelled by the network after only six episodes.

=== 2009–present: The Good Wife ===
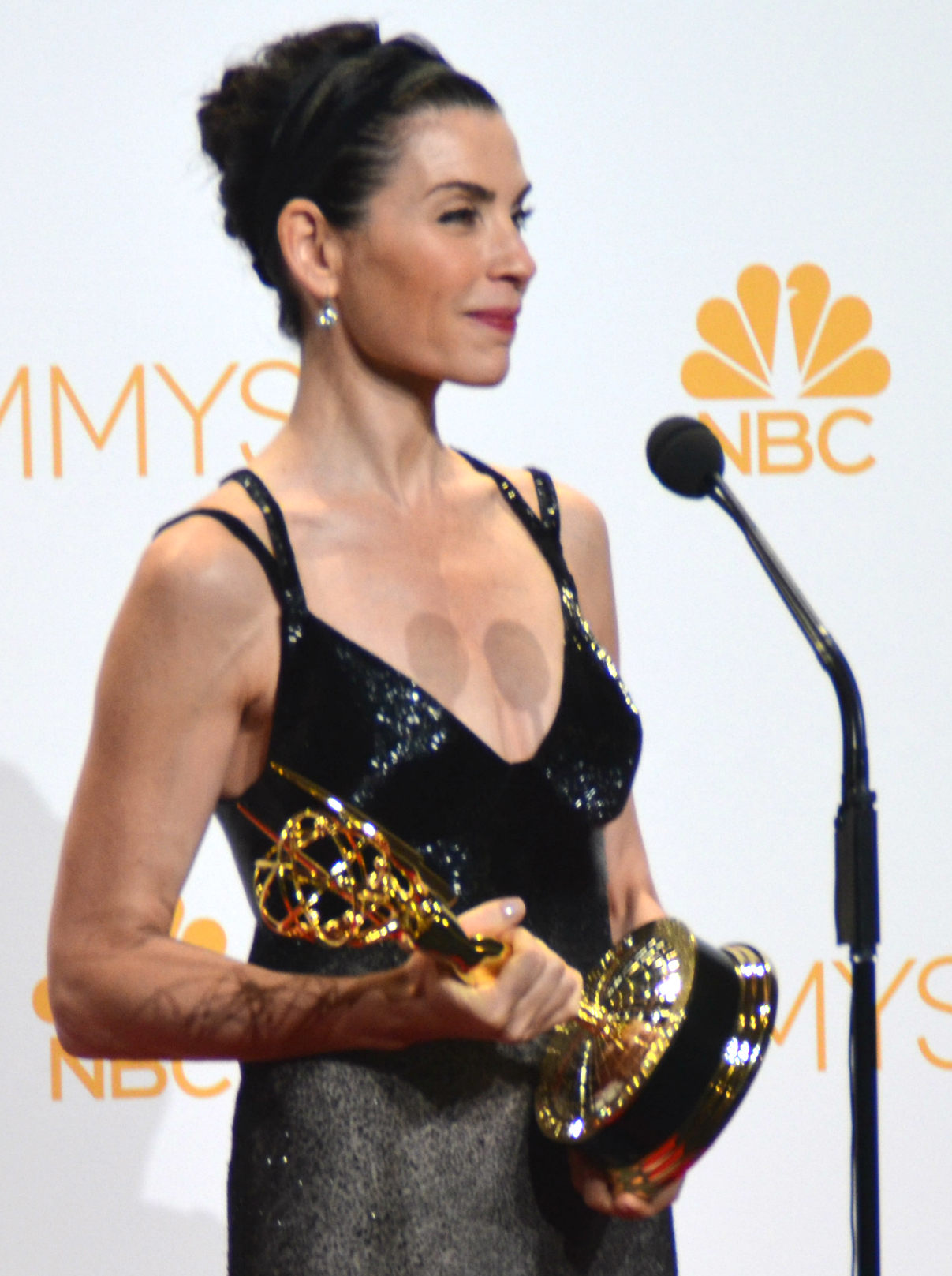
Margulies at the 66th Primetime Emmy Awards in 2014 after winning Outstanding Lead Actress in a Drama Series for The Good Wife

In 2009, after returning to ER for one episode during its 15th and final season, Margulies began starring in the CBS legal drama series The Good Wife. She played Alicia Florrick, an attorney returning to legal practice after her husband Peter Florrick (played by Chris Noth) resigned as Cook County State's Attorney amid a sex and corruption scandal. She won two Primetime Emmy Awards and a Golden Globe Award for the series. Beginning in 2011, starting with the third season, Margulies was credited as a producer of The Good Wife. The series ended in May 2016.

Reflecting on her roles as Alicia on The Good Wife and as Carol on ER, Margulies told Entertainment Weekly in 2021, "I have gotten to play two of the richest, I think, female characters on television." In a 2019 interview for the Series Mania Festival, Margulies said that "it's tied between Carol Hathaway and Alicia Florrick" when it comes to the role she is most proud of having played.

She was named a face of L'Oreal Paris in 2010. Since 2013, the actress has done voiceovers for a Chase credit card commercial. In 2014, Margulies narrated "Women in Business", an episode of season 2 of the documentary series Makers: Women Who Make America. In 2015, TIME featured Margulies as one of the "100 Most Influential People in the World". It noted her work to get Erin's Law, concerned with child sexual abuse, passed in every US state.

In 2018, Margulies co-starred in the dark comedy series Dietland on AMC, which was cancelled after one season despite positive reviews. In 2019, she starred in the National Geographic series The Hot Zone, as Dr. Nancy Jaax. The limited series became the highest-rated scripted series in National Geographic's history and ranks second among all series.

In 2019, Margulies was slated to reprise the role of Alicia Florrick for three episodes of The Good Fight, a spin-off of The Good Wife. However, negotiations broke down over the question of Margulies' salary, with CBS offering to pay her at the guest star rate instead of the same rate she had been paid on The Good Wife. She stated that: "I watch the show, I love the show. But I'm not a guest star. You don't pay me a guest-star salary. I would get a guest-star salary if I went and did SVU—it's not my show. I wouldn't ask for what I got paid as Alicia Florrick. I also know for a fact that any male star who got asked to go on a spin-off of his show would have been offered at least $500,000. I know that for a fact." At the time, an executive for CBS All Access said that Margulies was attached to an in-development project for the platform.

In November 2019, Margulies guest starred in the Showtime drama series Billions. In December 2020, she joined the second season of the Apple TV+ drama series The Morning Show. She joined returning series stars Jennifer Aniston and Reese Witherspoon.

In 2021, Margulies appeared with many of her former ER cast members in a virtual cast reunion show that benefited the Waterkeeper Alliance charity.

In 2024, Margulies returned to Broadway, portraying Delia Ephron in a new play based on Ephron's life titled Left on Tenth.

== Writing ==
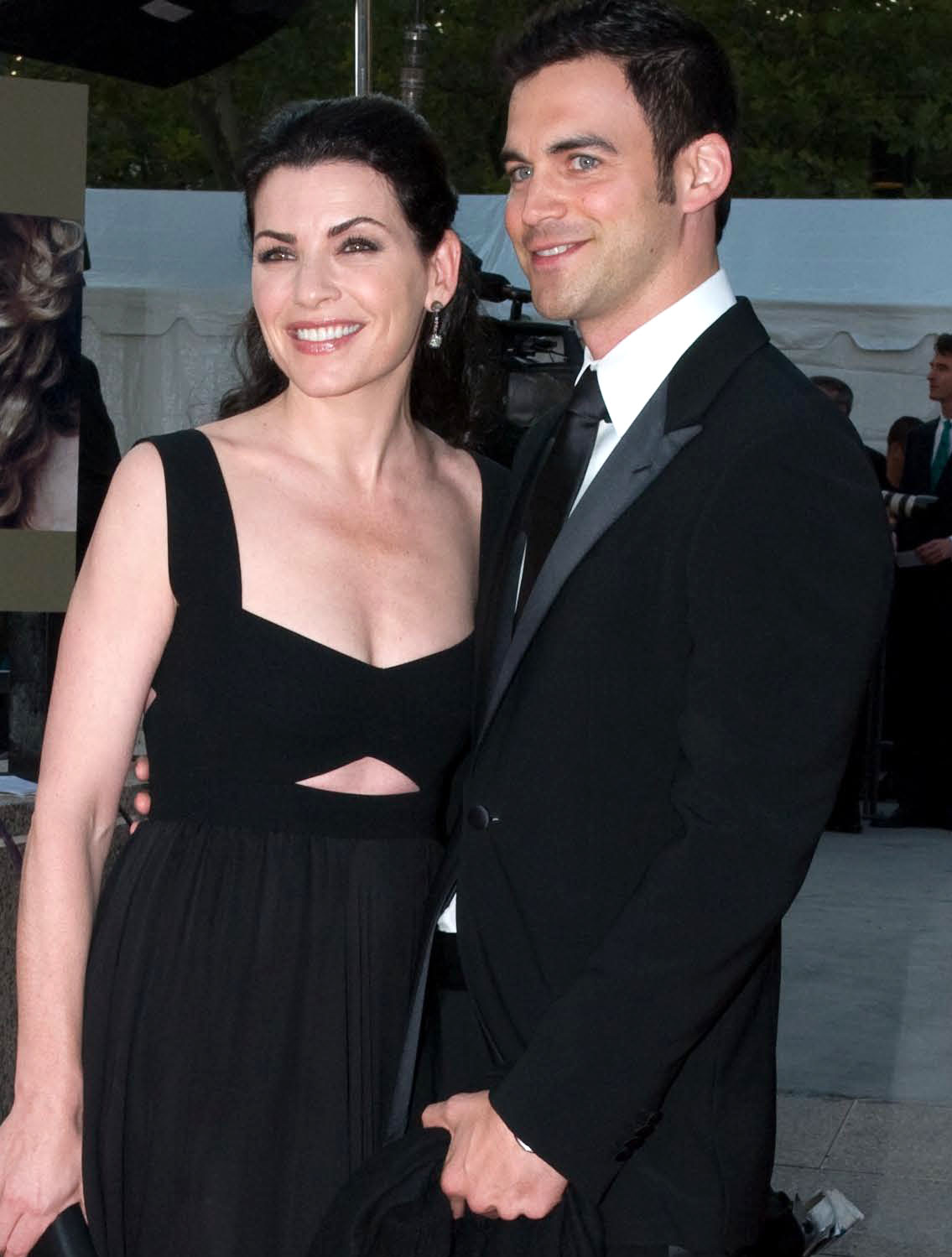
Margulies and husband Keith Lieberthal at the Metropolitan Opera in 2008

Margulies published a picture book with Random House Children's Books in May 2016. Titled Three Magic Balloons, the story is based on one that the actress's father, Paul Margulies, wrote for her and her sisters. In October 2020, Margulies announced on her Instagram that she was writing an autobiography, Sunshine Girl: An Unexpected Life, published by Ballantine Books. She had originally intended to write an acting handbook about set etiquette, but ended up writing a memoir instead. The book chronicles her nomadic childhood and journey to becoming an actress. Her book was released on May 4, 2021. Margulies also recorded the audiobook. A paperback version was released in May 2022.

== Personal life ==
From 1991 to 2003, Margulies was in a relationship with actor Ron Eldard, whom she met in an acting class.

On November 10, 2007, Margulies married attorney Keith Lieberthal, the son of academic Kenneth Lieberthal, in Lenox, Massachusetts. They have a son, Kieran Lindsay Lieberthal, who was born in 2008. They reside in Manhattan. The couple also owns a country house in Upstate New York.

Margulies is on the board of the MCC Theater Company in New York City. She is also a supporter of research on amyotrophic lateral sclerosis through Project ALS, as well as Erin's Law.

In 2011, she appeared in a video for the Human Rights Campaign's "New Yorkers for Marriage Equality" campaign.

She was a supporter of Barack Obama in the 2012 United States presidential election and Hillary Clinton in the 2016 United States presidential election.

In 2022, she hosted the Physicians for Human Rights virtual gala, "A Celebration of Health and Human Rights Heroes".

Margulies created the educational program Holocaust Educator School Partnership (HESP) at the Museum of Jewish Heritage in 2022 as a way to promote Holocaust education in schools and is a trustee of the museum. In June 2023, she spoke about her experience as an actress from a Jewish background at a panel discussion at the Paley Center for Media on the topic of "Jewish Representation on Television". In October 2023, she was one of many Hollywood signatories of a letter calling on President Joe Biden to work toward the release of all Israeli hostages after the October 7 attacks. In January 2024, she signed an open letter calling on the Academy of Motion Picture Arts and Sciences to include Jews in its representation and inclusion standards. Later that year in March, Margulies signed an open letter denouncing Jonathan Glazer for condemning the Israeli occupation of the Palestinian Territories during his acceptance speech at the 96th Academy Awards.

In 2023, Margulies faced backlash from comments she made in a discussion of antisemitism and the Gaza war on The Back Room with Andy Ostroy podcast. Seemingly referencing an instance where what she described as a "Black lesbian club" on the Columbia University campus discouraged Zionists from attending a film screening, Margulies was quoted as saying "As someone who plays a lesbian journalist on The Morning Show, I am more offended by it as a lesbian than I am as a Jew, to be honest with you" and that to Hamas, members of that group would be "even lower than the Jews – (a) you're Black, and (b) you're gay. And you're turning your back against the people who support you?' Because Jews, they rally around everybody." Margulies later released a statement, saying, "I am horrified by the fact that statements I made on a recent podcast offended the Black and LGBTQIA+ communities, communities I truly love and respect. I want to be 100% clear: Racism, homophobia, sexism, or any prejudice against anyone's personal beliefs or identity are abhorrent to me, full stop."

== Filmography ==
=== Film ===
Year	Title	Role	Notes
1991	Out for Justice	Rica	
1997	Traveller	Jean	
1997	Paradise Road	Topsy Merritt	
1998	The Newton Boys	Louise Brown	
1998	A Price Above Rubies	Rachel	
1999	The Big Day	Sara	
2000	What's Cooking?	Carla	
2000	Dinosaur	Neera	Voice
2002	The Man from Elysian Fields	Dena	
2002	Evelyn	Bernadette Beattie	
2002	Ghost Ship	Maureen Epps	
2005	Slingshot	Karen	
2006	The Darwin Awards	Carla	
2006	The Armenian Genocide	Narrator	
2006	Snakes on a Plane	Claire Miller	
2006	Beautiful Ohio	Mrs. Cubano	
2009	City Island	Joyce Rizzo	
2011	No Job for a Woman	Narrator	
2012	Stand Up Guys	Nina Hirsch	
2016	The Last Gold	Narrator	
2017	The Upside	Lily Foley	
2017	Three Christs	Ruth	
2024	Millers in Marriage	Maggie	

=== Television ===
Year	Title	Role	Notes
1993	Murder, She Wrote	Rachel Novaro	Episode: "Murder at a Discount"
1993	Law & Order	Ruth Mendoza	Episode: "Conduct Unbecoming"
1994	Homicide: Life on the Street	Linda	2 episodes
1994–2000, 2009	ER	Carol Hathaway	Main role
1995	The Larry Sanders Show	Herself	Episode: "Larry's on Vacation"
1998	Ellen	Ellen Screen Test #5	Episode: "Ellen: A Hollywood Tribute: Part 1"
2000	Saturday Night Live	Herself (host)	Episode: "Julianna Margulies / DMX"
2001	The Mists of Avalon	Morgaine	Main role; miniseries
2001	Jenifer	Jenifer's Psychiatrist	Television film
2003	Hitler: The Rise of Evil	Helene Hanfstaengl	2 episodes
2004	Scrubs	Neena Broderick	2 episodes
2004	The Grid	Maren Jackson	Main role
2006	The Lost Room	Jennifer Bloom	Main role
2006–2007	The Sopranos	Julianna Skiff	4 episodes
2008	Canterbury's Law	Elizabeth Canterbury	Main role; also producer
2009–2016	The Good Wife	Alicia Florrick	Main role; also producer (seasons 3–7)
2010	Sesame Street	Dr. Berger	Episode: "Big Bird Sprains His Wing"
2014	Makers: Women Who Make America	Narrator	Episode: "Women in Business"
2017	Nightcap	Herself	Episode: "Out of the Box"
2018	Dietland	Kitty Montgomery	Main role
2019	The Hot Zone	Nancy Jaax	Main role
2020	Billions	Catherine Brant	3 episodes
2021–2023	The Morning Show	Laura Peterson	Main role (seasons 2–3)

=== Theatre ===
Year	Title	Role	Venue	Ref.
1999	The Vagina Monologues	Performer	Westside Theatre	
2003	The 24 Hour Plays 2003	Molly	American Airlines Theatre	
2005	Escape: 6 Ways to Get Away 2	Performer	Circle in the Square Theatre	
2006	Festen	Helene	Music Box Theatre	
2006	The 24 Hour Plays 2006	Adrienne	American Airlines Theatre	
2024–2025	Left on Tenth	Delia	James Earl Jones Theater	
