= List of The Good Wife universe characters =

The Good Wife and its spin-offs The Good Fight and Elsbeth are, respectively, American legal, political, and police procedural television series produced by CBS Studios and created by Robert and Michelle King. The Good Wife and Elsbeth were produced for the CBS broadcast network, while The Good Fight was produced for CBS' sibling streaming service Paramount+.

The Good Wife follows the political, professional, and personal life of Alicia Florrick (Julianna Margulies), a political "good wife" who is thrust back into the workplace after over a decade after her husband, Peter Florrick (Chris Noth), a local Chicago politician, is arrested on corruption charges following a highly publicized sex scandal. The Good Fight follows Alicia's former colleagues Diane Lockhart (Christine Baranski) and Lucca Quinn (Cush Jumbo) contending with political and legal challenges in a new political environment as they continue their careers at a left-wing, African American–owned law firm, while Elsbeth follows Alicia's and Diane's former legal rival Elsbeth Tascioni (Carrie Preston) as she leaves lawyering behind to become a consultant detective, modelling herself after Columbo.

== Main cast ==
List indicators
=	Main cast (credited)
=	Recurring cast (4+)
=	Guest cast (1-3)

Actor	Character	The Good Wife							The Good Fight						Elsbeth		
Actor	Character	1	2	3	4	5	6	7	1	2	3	4	5	6	1	2	3
Julianna Margulies	Alicia Florrick	Main	Main	Main	Main	Main	Main	Main									
Matt Czuchry	Cary Agos	Main	Main	Main	Main	Main	Main	Main									
Archie Panjabi	Kalinda Sharma	Main	Main	Main	Main	Main	Main										
Graham Phillips	Zach Florrick	Main	Main	Main	Main	Main	R	Guest									
Makenzie Vega	Grace Florrick	Main	Main	Main	Main	Main	Main	Main									
Josh Charles	Will Gardner	Main	Main	Main	Main	Main	Guest	Guest									
Christine Baranski	Diane Lockhart	Main	Main	Main	Main	Main	Main	Main	Main	Main	Main	Main	Main	Main			
Alan Cumming	Eli Gold	R	Main	Main	Main	Main	Main	Main						Guest			
Zach Grenier	David Lee	Guest	Recurring	Recurring	Recurring	Main	Main	Main	Guest			Main	Main	Guest			
Matthew Goode	Finn Polmar					Main	Main										
Cush Jumbo	Lucca Quinn							Main (Note: Jumbo and Lindo are both credited as main cast in the season 5 premiere, although they do not appear in any subsequent episodes.)	Main	Main	Main	Main	Main				
Jeffrey Dean Morgan	Jason Crouse							Main									
Rose Leslie	Maia Rindell								Main	Main	Main						
Erica Tazel	Barbara Kolstad								Main	Guest							
Delroy Lindo	Adrian Boseman								Main	Main	Main	Main	Main				
Sarah Steele	Marissa Gold		Guest	Guest			Recurring	Recurring	Main	Main	Main	Main	Main	Main			R
Justin Bartha	Colin Morrello								Main	Main							
Nyambi Nyambi	Jay Dipersia								R	Main	Main	Main	Main	Main			
Michael Boatman	Julius Cain	Recurring	Recurring	Recurring		Guest	Guest		R	Main	Main	Main	Main	Main			
Audra McDonald	Liz Lawrence				Guest					Main	Main	Main	Main	Main			
Michael Sheen	Roland Blum										Main						
John Larroquette	Gavin Firth											Main					
Charmaine Bingwa	Carmen Moyo												Main	Main			
Mandy Patinkin	Hal Wackner												Main				
John Slattery	Lyle Bettencourt													Main			
Andre Braugher	Ri'Chard Lane													Main			
Carrie Preston	Elsbeth Tascioni	R		Recurring	Recurring	Recurring	Recurring	Guest	Recurring	Recurring				Guest	Main	Main	Main
Wendell Pierce	C. W. Wagner														Main	Main	Main
Carra Patterson	Kaya Blanke														Main	Main	Guest

== Recurring cast ==
Actor	Character	The Good Wife							The Good Fight						Elsbeth	
Actor	Character	1	2	3	4	5	6	7	1	2	3	4	5	6	1	2
Chris Noth	Peter Florrick	Recurring	Recurring	Recurring	Recurring	Recurring	Recurring	Recurring								
Mary Beth Peil	Jackie Florrick	Recurring	Recurring	Recurring	Recurring	Recurring	Recurring	Recurring								
Renée Elise Goldsberry	ASA Geneva Pine	Recurring	Recurring	Recurring	Recurring	Recurring	Recurring	Guest								
Mike Colter	Lemond Bishop	Recurring	Recurring	Guest	Recurring	Recurring	Recurring			Guest	Guest					
Denis O'Hare	Charles Abernathy	Recurring	Recurring	Guest	R		Guest	Guest	Guest	Guest			Guest			
Chris Butler	ASA Matan Brody	Recurring	Recurring	Guest	Guest	Recurring	Recurring	Recurring			Guest					
David Fonteno	Robert Parks	Recurring	Recurring	Guest	Guest	Guest	R									
Titus Welliver	Glenn Childs	Recurring	Recurring	Guest												
Dreama Walker	Becca	Recurring	Recurring			Guest										
Gbenga Akinnagbe	Pastor Isaiah Easton	Recurring	Recurring				R									
Pedro Pascal	ASA Nathan Landry	Recurring	Recurring													
Sonequa Martin-Green	Courtney Wells	Recurring	Recurring													
Dylan Baker	Colin Sweeney	R		Recurring	Recurring	Guest	Guest		Guest	Guest						
David Paymer	Richard Cuesta	R	Guest	Guest			Recurring	Recurring								
Peter Riegert	Harvey Winter	R		R												
Peter Gerety	Timothy Stanek	R				Guest			Guest	Guest						
Kevin Conway	Jonas Stern	R	Guest													
Joe Morton	Daniel Golden	R		Guest												
Martha Plimpton	Patti Nyholm	R	Guest	Guest	Guest											
James Carpinello	Anthony Burton	R														
Jill Flint	Lana Delaney	R	Guest	Recurring	Recurring		R									
Francie Swift	Kya Poole	R														
Gary Cole	Kurt McVeigh	R	Guest	Guest	Guest	Recurring	Recurring	Recurring	Recurring	Recurring	Recurring	Recurring	Recurring	Recurring		
Kim Shaw	Amber Madison	R	Guest													
Karen Olivo	Giada Cabrini	R			Guest											
Terry Kinney	Gerald Kozko	R														
Anika Noni Rose	Wendy Scott-Carr		Recurring	Recurring	Guest											
Paulina Gerzon	Shannon Vargas	Guest	R	Guest												
Rachel Hilson	Nisa Dalmar		R	Guest	Guest	Guest	Guest									
Dallas Roberts	Owen Cavanaugh		Recurring	Recurring	Recurring	Recurring	Recurring	Recurring								
JD Williams	Dexter Roja		R		R		R									
Jack Carpenter	Patric Edelstein		R	Guest		Guest	Guest									
Ana Gasteyer	Patrice Lessner	Guest	R		Guest		Guest									
Jane Alexander	Suzanne Morris		R		Guest	Guest	Guest		Guest	Guest						
Michael Ealy	Derrick Bond		R													
Scott Porter	Blake Calamar		R													
America Ferrera	Natalie Flores		R			Guest										
Mamie Gummer	Nancy Crozier	Guest	R	Guest	Guest	Guest	Guest	Guest		Guest			Guest			
Michael J. Fox	Louis Canning		Recurring	Recurring	Recurring	Recurring	Recurring	Recurring				R				
Frederick Weller	Wilk Hobson		R		Guest											
Felix Solis	Kevin Rodriguez	Guest	R			Guest	Guest	Guest								
Mike Pniewski	Frank Landau		Recurring	Recurring	Recurring		Guest	R		R	Guest	R		Guest		
Skipp Sudduth	Jim Moody		R		Recurring	Recurring										
Jeremy Strong	Matt Becker		R		Guest											
Ismael Cruz Córdova	Jimmy Patrick		Recurring	Recurring												
Cady Huffman	Marina Vassel		Recurring	Recurring		Guest										
Tim Guinee	Andrew Wiley		Recurring	Recurring			R									
Kelli Giddish	Sophia Russo		R	Guest			Guest									
Elizabeth Reaser	Tammy Linnata		R	Guest												
Rita Wilson	Viola Walsh		R	Guest	Guest	Guest	Guest									
Monica Raymund	ASA Dana Lodge			R												
Anne Marsen	Jennifer			R		Guest	Guest									
Kurt Fuller	Peter Dunaway			R	Guest	Guest	Guest	R		Guest	Guest					
Jerry Adler	Howard Lyman		Guest	Recurring	Recurring	Recurring	Recurring	Recurring	Guest	Guest						
Anna Camp	Caitlin D'arcy			R				Guest								
Edward Herrmann	Lionel Deerfield		Guest	R	Guest	Guest										
Lisa Edelstein	Celeste Serrano			R												
Grace Rex	Martha Reed			R	Guest			Guest								
Matthew Perry	Mike Kresteva			Recurring	Recurring				R							
Parker Posey	Vanessa Gold			R												
Amy Sedaris	Stacie Hall			R												
John Shea	Jeffrey Agos			R												
Michael Kelly	Mickey Gunn			R												
Amanda Peet	ASA Laura Hellinger				R											
Stockard Channing	Veronica Loy				Recurring	Recurring	Guest	R								
Yul Vazquez	Cristián Romano				R											
John Benjamin Hickey	Neil Gross		Guest	Guest	Recurring	Recurring	Guest	Guest	R					Guest		
Marc Warren	Nick Savarese				R											
Bebe Neuwirth	Claudia Friend			Guest	R					Guest			Guest			
Kenneth Tigar	James Chase				Recurring	Recurring										
Vincent Curatola	Thomas Politi				Recurring	Recurring										
Dominic Chianese	Michael Marx				R	Guest		R								
Nathan Lane	Clarke Hayden				Recurring	Recurring										
Robbie Sublett	John Gaultner				Recurring	Recurring										
Jess Weixler	Robyn Burdine				Recurring	Recurring	Recurring									
John Glover	Jared Andrews		Guest		R		Guest				Guest					
Brian Dennehy	Bucky Stabler				R											
Kyle MacLachlan	AUSA Josh Perotti				R		R									
Nicole Roderick	Nora		Guest		Recurring	Recurring	Recurring	Recurring								
Maura Tierney	Maddie Hayward				R											
T. R. Knight	Jordan Karahalios				R											
Eric Ruffin	Dylan Bishop		Guest		R		R									
Miriam Shor	Mandy Post				Recurring	Recurring	Guest									
Michael Cerveris	James Castro					Recurring	Recurring									
Hunter Parrish	Jeffrey Grant					R										
Jeffrey Tambor	George Kluger					R										
Ben Rappaport	Carey Zepps					Recurring	Recurring									
Bhavesh Patel	Anthony Wright Edelman					R										
Jason O'Mara	Damian Boyle					R										
Christian Borle	Carter Schmidt					R	Guest	Guest		Guest			Guest			Guest
Jill Hennessy	Rayna Hecht					R	Guest									
James McDaniel	Lou Johnson	Guest				R										
Jordana Spiro	Jenna Villette					R										
Eric Bogosian	Nelson Dubeck					R										
Zach Woods	Jeff Dellinger					R		R								
Tobias Segal	Tyler Hopkins					R		R								
Michael Kostroff	Charles Froines					R		Guest								
Melissa George	Marilyn Garbanza					R										
Nathan Stark	Process Server				Guest	Recurring	Recurring	Guest	Recurring	Recurring	Recurring					
Charlie Pollock	'Darkness at Noon' Lead Actor					R	Guest	Guest		Guest						
Fred Melamed	Alan Karpman			Guest			R									
John Procaccino	Tom Glatt						R		Guest							
Taye Diggs	Dean Levine-Wilkins						R									
Jason Babinsky	Drummond Howell						R	Guest								
Connie Nielsen	Ramona Lytton						R									
John Ventimiglia	Gary Prima						R									
Steven Pasquale	Johnny Elfman						R							Guest		
David Hyde Pierce	Frank Prady						R									
David Krumholtz	Josh Mariner						R	Guest								
Frankie Faison	Pastor Jeremiah Easton	Guest	Guest				R		Guest							
Susan Misner	Simone Canning		Guest		Guest		R									
Linda Lavin	Joy Grubick						R									
Edward Asner	Guy Redmayne						R									
Megan Ketch	Deena Lampard				Guest	Guest	R									
Oliver Platt	Reese 'R.D.' Dipple						R									
Christopher McDonald	Don Schakowsky							R								
Nikki M. James	Monica Timmons							R		R		Guest				
Rob Bartlett	Bernie Bukovitz							R								
Peter Gallagher	Ethan Carver							R								
Will Patton	Michael B. Tascioni							R								
Christine Lahti	Andrea Stevens							R	Guest	Guest						
Michael Urie	Stephen Dinovera					Guest		R			R					
John Magaro	Roland Hlavin							R								
Matthew Morrison	AUSA Connor Fox							R								
Margo Martindale	Ruth Eastman							R		R			Guest			
Vanessa Williams	Courtney Paige							R								
Megan Hilty	Holly Westfall							R		Guest						
Phumzile Sitole	Sharise								R		Guest					
John Cameron Mitchell	Felix Staples								R		Guest	Guest		Guest		
Corey Cott	Tom C. Duncan								Recurring	Recurring						
Zachary Booth	Jerry Warshofsky								Recurring	Recurring						
Jane Lynch	Madeline Starkey								Recurring	Recurring			R			
Paul Guilfoyle	Henry Rindell								Recurring	Recurring						
Bernadette Peters	Lenore Rindell								Recurring	Recurring						
Heléne Yorke	Amy Bresline								Recurring	Recurring						
Chalia La Tour	Yesha Mancini								R							
Scott Bryce	Rupert Lennox								R							
Tom McGowan	Jax Rindell								R							
Adam Heller	Wilbur Dincon								R	Guest		Guest				
Katrina Lenk	Naftali Amato								Guest	R						
Rob McClure	Trig Mullaney									R			Guest			
Alan Alda	Solomon Waltzer									R	Guest					
Wendell B. Franklin	Capt. Ian Lawrence									R	Guest					
Andrea Martin	Francesca Lovatelli								Guest	Recurring	Recurring					
Taylor Louderman	Tara Strokes									Guest	R					
Tamberla Perry	Charlotte Hazlewood										Recurring	Recurring	Guest			
Tyrone Mitchell Henderson	Barry Poe									Guest	Recurring	Recurring	Recurring			
Brenda Praxton	Madeline Gilford										Recurring	Recurring	Recurring	Guest		
Christina Jackson	Rosalyn Brock										Recurring	Recurring				
Keesha Sharp	Naomi Nivola									Guest	R					
Kate Shindle	Rachelle Max										R					
Lauren Patten	Polly Dean										R					
Samaria Nixon-Fleming	Louisa										Guest	Recurring	Recurring			
Rachel Nicks	Leah Davis										Guest	R	Guest	Guest		
Hugh Dancy	Caleb Garin											R	Guest			
Lisa O'Hare	STR Laurie employee											R				
Chasten Harmon	Bianca Skye											R	Guest			
Wallace Shawn	Charles Lester				Guest	Guest	Guest			Guest			Recurring	Recurring		
Danny Burstein	William Schultz												R	Guest		
Ben Vereen	Frederick Douglass												R			
Wayne Brady	Del Cooper												R	Guest		
Tony Plana	Oscar Rivi												R	Guest		
Stephanie Nogueras	Isabel Rivi												R			
Stephen Lang	David Cord												R			
Jane Curtin	Pamela Farley							Guest			Guest		R			
Danny McCarthy	Agent Fred Celetano														R	
Fredric Lehne	Lieutenant Dave Noonan														R	
Gloria Reuben	Claudia Payne														R	
Danny Mastrogiorgio	Detective Bobby Smullen														R	
Molly Price	Detective Donnelly														R	
Micaela Diamond	Detective Edwards														R	
Ajay Naidu	Martin Wali														R	
Daniel K. Isaac	Lieutenant Steve Connor															R
Michael Emerson	Judge Milton Crawford															R

== Guest cast ==
Actor	Character	The Good Wife							The Good Fight						Elsbeth	
Actor	Character	1	2	3	4	5	6	7	1	2	3	4	5	6	1	2
Kate Burton	Victoria Adler	Guest	Guest	Guest												
F. Murray Abraham	Burl Preston		Guest	Guest	Guest	Guest				Guest						
Linda Emond	Leora Kuhn		Guest	Guest	Guest							Guest				
Patrick Breen	Captain Terrence Hicks		Guest	Guest				Guest								
Fred Thompson	Frank Michael Thomas		Guest	Guest												
Lily Rabe	Petra Moritz		Guest		Guest		Guest									
Jason Biggs	Dylan Stack			Guest	Guest				Guest							
Aaron Tveit	ASA Spencer Zschau			Guest					Guest		Guest		Guest			
Becky Ann Baker	Alma Hoff				Guest	Guest		Guest	Guest	Guest				Guest		
Will Chase	Doug Young				Guest	Guest										
John Noble	Matthew Ashbaugh				Guest	Guest										
Richard Kind	Alan Davies					Guest					Guest			Guest		
Mo Rocca	Ted Willoughby						Guest	Guest		Guest	Guest		Guest	Guest		
Richard Masur	Arbiter Geoffrey Solomon						Guest	Guest		Guest						
William M. Finkelstein	Simon Kassovitz								Guest	Guest	Guest					
Fisher Stevens	Gabriel Kovac								Guest	Guest		Guest				
Greta Lee	Amber Wood-Lutz								Guest	Guest						
Jayne Houdyshell	Renée Rampling								Guest	Guest						
Rachel Wenitsky	Lili Brenner								Guest		Guest	Guest				
Audrie Neenan	Marion Handgrove								Guest					Guest		
Rob Reiner	Josh Brickner									Guest		Guest				
LaChanze	Julius's Wife										Guest	Guest				
Stephen Moyer	Alex Modarian														Guest	
Jane Krakowski	Joann Lenox														Guest	
Linda Lavin	Gloria Blecher														Guest	
Jesse Tyler Ferguson	Skip Mason														Guest	
Retta	Margo Clarke														Guest	
Kelly AuCoin	Declan Armstrong														Guest	
Blair Underwood	Cliff McGrath														Guest	
Gina Gershon	Dr. Vanessa Holmes														Guest	
Daniel Davis	Dr. Yablonski														Guest	Guest
Keegan-Michael Key	Ashton Hayes														Guest	
Geneva Carr	Poppy Hayes														Guest	
Elizabeth Lail	Quinn Powers														Guest	
Arian Moayed	Joe														Guest	
Laura Benanti	Nadine Clay														Guest	
Andre de Shields	Matteo Hart														Guest	
Nathan Lane	Philip Cross															Guest
Terry Serpico	Doug Howe															Guest
Rob Riggle	Neal Dorsey															Guest
Victor Williams	Aaron Pritchard															Guest
Melanie Chandra	Morgan Lee															Guest
Brittany O'Grady	Mackenzie "Mac" Altman															Guest
Vanessa Williams	Roslyn Bridwell															Guest
Jenn Lyon	Celeste															Guest
Becky Ann Baker	Judith															Guest
