= The Good Wife season 4 =

The Good Wife
- Season 4
- Season 4 U.S. DVD cover
- Starring: Julianna Margulies; Matt Czuchry; Archie Panjabi; Graham Phillips; Makenzie Vega; Alan Cumming; Josh Charles; Christine Baranski
- No. of episodes: 22

Release
- Original network: CBS
- Original release: September 30, 2012 – April 28, 2013

Season chronology
- ← Previous; Season 3 Next → Season 5

The fourth season of The Good Wife began airing on September 30, 2012. Executive producer Tony Scott died in August 2012, about a month prior to the start of the season, and the premiere was dedicated to him. The season finale aired on April 28, 2013.

== Premise ==
The series focuses on Alicia Florrick, whose husband Peter, the former Cook County, Illinois, state's attorney, has been jailed following a notorious political corruption and sex scandal. After having spent the previous thirteen years as a stay-at-home mother, Alicia returns to the workforce as a litigator to provide for her two children.

== Cast ==
=== Main ===
- Julianna Margulies as Alicia Florrick
- Matt Czuchry as Cary Agos
- Archie Panjabi as Kalinda Sharma
- Makenzie Vega as Grace Florrick
- Graham Phillips as Zach Florrick
- Alan Cumming as Eli Gold
- Josh Charles as Will Gardner
- Christine Baranski as Diane Lockhart

=== Recurring ===
- Chris Noth as Peter Florrick
- Nathan Lane as Clarke Hayden
- Zach Grenier as David Lee
- Marc Warren as Nick Savarese
- Maura Tierney as Maddie Hayward
- Amanda Peet as Captain Laura Hellinger
- T.R. Knight as Jordan Karahalios
- Jess Weixler as Robyn Burdine
- Mary Beth Peil as Jackie Florrick
- Renée Elise Goldsberry as Geneva Pine
- Skipp Sudduth as Jim Moody
- Carrie Preston as Elsbeth Tascioni
- Stockard Channing as Veronica Loy
- Miriam Shor as Mandy Post
- Mike Colter as Lemond Bishop
- Dallas Roberts as Owen Cavanaugh
- Denis O'Hare as Judge Charles Abernathy
- Dylan Baker as Colin Sweeney
- Mike Pniewski as Frank Landau
- John Benjamin Hickey as Neil Gross
- Kristin Chenoweth as Peggy Byrne
- Jill Flint as Lana Delaney
- Michael J. Fox as Louis Canning
- Matthew Perry as Mike Kresteva
- Kyle MacLachlan as Josh Perotti
- Yul Vazquez as Cristian Romano
- Susan Misner as Simone Canning

=== Guest ===
- Chris Butler as Matan Brody
- Gary Cole as Kurt McVeigh
- Martha Plimpton as Patti Nyholm
- Mamie Gummer as Nancy Crozier
- Ana Gasteyer as Judge Patrice Lessner
- Anika Noni Rose as Wendy Scott-Carr
- Rita Wilson as Viola Walsh
- Kurt Fuller as Judge Peter Dunaway
- Wallace Shawn as Charles Lester
- Tawny Cypress as Melinda
- Edward Herrmann as Lionel Deerfield
- Mike Doyle as Officer Mallen
- John Glover as Jared Andrews
- Annabella Sciorra as Lesli
- Grant Shaud as Judge Etts
- Linda Emond as Judge Leora Kuhn
- John Lutz as Eddie Kowalski
- Christina Ricci as Therese Dodd
- Judd Hirsch as Judge Creary
- Luke Kleintank as Connor
- Bebe Neuwirth as Judge Friend
- Bruce McGill as Jeremy Breslow
- Becky Ann Baker as Alma Hoff
- Stephen Root as Judge Murphy Wicks
- Jane Alexander as Judge Suzanne Morris
- Tamara Tunie as Serafina Norvy
- James Rebhorn as Wilkes Ingersol

== Episodes ==
No. overall	No. in season	Title	Directed by	Written by	Original release date	US viewers (millions)
69	1	"I Fought the Law"	Michael Zinberg	Robert King & Michelle King	September 30, 2012	9.93
Zach gets pulled over by a cop and the campaign is turned fully about family values; Alicia deals with a reporter who inquires about the status of her marriage to Peter. Will's suspension is over, and he returns to the firm. The firm deals with a trustee appointed to watch over them in the wake of their bankruptcy. Kalinda comes face-to-face with her estranged husband.
70	2	"And the Law Won"	Rosemary Rodriguez	Ted Humphrey	October 7, 2012	8.95
The firm attempts to renegotiate its building lease by sending Alicia to meet with their new landlord, Maddie Hayward, but that effort fails, while it inadvertently ends with Hayward donating to Peter's election campaign, which displeases Diane. Kalinda gets distracted by the presence of her estranged husband. On Will's first case after his suspension ends, he rejects the first settlement offer despite its reasonableness, which ends up complicating his case as he meets an active jury, which takes part in the examinations of witnesses.
71	3	"Two Girls, One Code"	Brooke Kennedy	Robert King & Michelle King	October 14, 2012	9.12
The firm argues against lawyer Viola Walsh and her internet billionaire client Neil Gross as it represents two startup founders who developed voice recognition software but were negatively affected by the tweaking of their search engine page ranking by Gross' Internet giant Chum-Hum. Alicia's affair with Will seems to be on the verge of being revealed to the press, but it actually turns into another potential scandal for Peter. The firm's trustee briefly clashes with Diane, and Kalinda's husband, Nick, discovers more about her sexual dalliances.
72	4	"Don't Haze Me, Bro"	Michael Zinberg	Keith Eisner	October 21, 2012	10.02
The firm sues a university claiming they were liable for the death of a student who died as a result of an extreme hazing ritual. Peter's mother, Jackie, tries to become more involved in her son's gubernatorial campaign after she recovers from her stroke. Eli and Alicia make one more attempt at staving off the publication of a potentially damaging article implicating Peter in another sexual scandal.
73	5	"Waiting for the Knock"	Frederick E.O. Toye	Leonard Dick	October 28, 2012	9.51
The firm is called to Lemond Bishop's aid after his accountant is arrested. Alicia is tasked with hand-holding Bishop's son to prepare and comfort him in case his father is arrested. Eli, having forestalled the publication of a damaging magazine article, must now contend with a blog threatening to post a story regarding the article not being published. Kalinda, through her husband, discovers something about her girlfriend, FBI Agent Delaney.
74	6	"The Art of War"	Josh Charles	Robert King & Michelle King & Ted Humphrey	November 4, 2012	9.93
Alicia is asked by military court judge Kuhn to represent military lawyer Laura Hellinger (Amanda Peet) as she brings suit against a military contractor employee in civil court for attempting to rape her. Peter hires a new caretaker for his aging mother, Jackie, after she has fired several others. Maddie Hayward announces she intends to run for governor against Peter. The firm's trustee begins adopting Steve Jobs' management style.
75	7	"Anatomy of a Joke"	James Whitmore Jr.	Craig Turk & Robert King & Michelle King	November 11, 2012	9.02
The firm represents a comedian (Christina Ricci) who exposes her breasts on live television and is compelled to apologize to FCC commissioners to convince them not to fine the network. Cary, after many years, has a chance meeting with his father that doesn't end well. Eli tries to deal with a new rumor regarding a detail of Peter's "anatomy", and Peter hires a new assistant state's attorney after Alicia recommends Laura Hellinger. Lockhart/Gardner is almost sold by the firm's trustee, saved only by last-minute maneuvering by Diane, Will and David Lee.
76	8	"Here Comes the Judge"	Rosemary Rodriguez	Meredith Averill	November 18, 2012	9.94
Will Gardner defends a client who is accused of killing her husband for his fortune, in Laura Hellinger's first case as ASA. The case alone could get the firm out of debt, freeing them of supervision of the trustee. However, when Will encounters the inebriated judge in a bar, the judge voices his opinion on not only the case but on Will as a lawyer, and the firm brings a motion to substitute the judge for bias. A classmate of Grace kills herself after her boyfriend Connor breaks their relationship, and Grace becomes dangerously attracted to Connor. Eli tries to involve Alicia's children more in the campaign after a tracker videotapes Grace. Cary draws the suspicious eye of Kalinda's husband, Nick.
77	9	"A Defense of Marriage"	Brooke Kennedy	Story by : Matthew Montoya; Teleplay by : Robert King & Michelle King	November 25, 2012	9.45
Alicia and Diane represent the CFO of an online tax return company whose conversations with his husband could implicate him in defrauding the government. A famous lawyer, known for his appearances arguing before the Supreme Court of the United States, offers to help the firm with the case, but soon attempts to throw in the towel in order to lay the groundwork for a Supreme Court appeal challenging the Defense of Marriage Act. Alicia's mother, Veronica, visits and seeks help in overturning a will that cut her out of her late husband's inheritance when his son convinced him Veronica was cheating. Cary approaches Nick the day after he was assaulted.
78	10	"Battle of the Proxies"	Griffin Dunne	Ted Humphrey	December 2, 2012	9.70
Alicia and Will represent a client who allegedly murdered a woman in Chicago during a music festival but is not the only one being tried for her murder. A different man is being tried in another jurisdiction, Minooka, on exactly the same charge, and a guilty verdict in that trial could prove the Chicago defendant innocent. Alicia is tasked with assisting the prosecution in Minooka. Eli is approached by a representative of the United States Department of Justice investigating illegal campaign bribes, ostensibly relating to his ex-wife's campaign for the state senate. Nick is dropped by the firm as a client after it becomes apparent that he is using his tow truck company to smuggle drugs.
79	11	"Boom De Yah Da"	Félix Alcalá	Nichelle Tramble Spellman	January 6, 2013	9.96
Will & Diane face mediation, requested by the trustee, Clarke Hayden. Displeased by the way they sabotaged his attempts to sell the firm, Clarke requests that Will & Diane be removed from their positions as managing partners. Alicia faces Louis Canning again, struggling to depose an executive in a lawsuit against a bank that had foreclosed on houses with stagnant swimming pools, facilitating the spread of disease-bearing mosquitoes. Eli files a harassment complaint against the Department of Justice, only to discover that Wendy Scott-Carr has taken charge of the investigation against him. Cary is placed in a precarious position that could compromise his friendship with Clarke.
80	12	"Je Ne Sais What?"	Matt Shakman	Jacqueline Hoyt	January 13, 2013	10.04
Alicia, Diane and Will come to the aid of eccentric attorney Elsbeth Tascioni, who is arrested just prior to her hearing before the CAS (Court of Arbitration for Sport). Alicia struggles to get Elsbeth out on bail, while Diane and Will contend with the three French-speaking CAS judges and the court's reversed burden of proof; they must prove their client innocent of doping. Eli and his new second-in-command, Jordan, clash with each other over a new campaign issue: racial bias. Peter makes a speech at a minority-rights organization during which he is booed.
81	13	"The Seven Day Rule"	Michael Zinberg	Keith Eisner	January 27, 2013	9.35
The firm goes to court to fight their new creditor, Louis Canning, for an extension on their bankruptcy plan, with Clarke Hayden playing an unexpected part in the eventual outcome. Alicia is offered partnership about which she is initially ecstatic, but she then hesitates once she realizes she must pay $600,000 as part of her capital contribution. With the firm still $30 million in debt, Alicia realizes the offer may not have been sincere. Neil Gross's fiancée hires David Lee to negotiate her prenuptual agreement and everyone works to ensure that both young love and financial equity triumph. On the campaign trail, Alicia is once again at odds with Eli regarding her previous friendship with Maddie Hayward.
82	14	"Red Team, Blue Team"	Jim McKay	Robert King & Michelle King	February 17, 2013	8.35
As the firm finally clears its debt, Alicia, Cary and the other associates who were previously offered partnership are shocked to find that the partners have voted to delay their offers for a year. Tensions are exacerbated when Alicia and Cary are asked to prosecute in a mock trial against Diane and Will; the outcome of the mock trial has real consequences with the firm's client, an energy beverage company being sued for the death of a young girl after she consumed one of their products. Elsbeth Tascioni, after being retained by Eli Gold, must now contend with the Department of Justice as Eli tries to secure his position in the campaign from Jordan.
83	15	"Going for the Gold"	Rosemary Rodriguez	Leonard Dick	March 3, 2013	8.99
Peter prepares to engage Maddie Hayward in their first televised debate, with Diane Lockhart helping him prepare. The firm attempts to bid for the state's attorney's tender to represent them in civil lawsuits. Eli, no longer on the campaign, fights in federal and state courts to clear his name as Frank Landau, head of the Democratic committee accuses him of buying votes for Peter's campaign. Alicia, after being promoted to partner, must now deal with asserting her new position of authority over her disgruntled former peers.
84	16	"Runnin' with the Devil"	Christopher Misiano	Meredith Averill	March 10, 2013	9.21
Lemond Bishop goes to trial, charged with the murder of a confidential informant. While defending him, Alicia goes up against her old law school classmate. In addition, Bishop instructs the firm to work with a peculiar lawyer on his defense. With the firm now enjoying a surplus of cash, the partners debate on what to do with it, and explore the possibility of re-leasing the two building floors that they lost during bankruptcy, as well as hiring a second investigator.
85	17	"Invitation to an Inquest"	Kevin Hooks	Story by : Julia Wolfe; Teleplay by : Julia Wolfe & Matthew Montoya	March 17, 2013	9.08
Alicia and Will attend the coroner's inquest into the death of an Illinois Supreme Court judge who died in a car crash, their client being the wife of the deceased, who stands to earn millions from a life insurance policy. Cary has another chance encounter with his father, who brings new business to the firm, which strains their already rocky relationship. Peter beats Maddie Hayward and wins the Democratic primary. Using Alicia's family, Eli schemes against Jordan to get him thrown off the campaign.
86	18	"Death of a Client"	Robert King	Robert King & Michelle King	March 24, 2013	9.59
During the Chicago Shamrock Dinner, one of the firm's long-time clients is murdered. As Alicia represented him, she is asked by the police to aid in their investigation. Unsure of her obligations towards her deceased client, she is pressured into divulging information that could potentially break attorney-client privilege. Diane is approached by Peter to fill the seat of a recently deceased Illinois Supreme Court judge if Peter wins the governorship. Also in attendance at the Shamrock dinner is Alicia's old nemesis, Republican gubernatorial candidate Mike Kresteva, who ends up in a physical confrontation with Peter.
87	19	"The Wheels of Justice"	Frederick E.O. Toye	Jacqueline Hoyt	March 31, 2013	8.59
Alicia represents Colin Sweeney again, this time against an apparently minor charge that could potentially turn into a life sentence for him if a Supreme Court decision on three strikes is rendered before the firm can resolve the case. With the prosecution stalling, the firm must rush through trial in order to head off a conviction. Diane reconnects with ballistics expert Kurt McVeigh. She asks Kalinda to vet her after Peter offers her a judgeship, which ends up uncovering troubling information about her family's past.
88	20	"Rape: A Modern Perspective"	Brooke Kennedy	J. C. Nolan	April 14, 2013	10.14
Alicia and Will represent a woman who accuses a recently admitted Princeton student of raping her. She sues in civil court because her accused rapist evaded jail in a plea bargain. Her case is hurt, however, when she breaks a gag order and an internet hacker group, Anonymous, decides to get involved in the case. Diane, still being vetted as a potential Supreme Court judge, has to deal with addressing concerns regarding her personal and business life. Dylan Stack, one of the three alleged owners of Bitcoin, returns to Chicago to ask Alicia and her firm to help him execute a class action against prosecutorial overcharging. He ascertains that overcharging is what drove internet activist Aaron Swartz to commit suicide and wants revenge. Cary, after being probed by the new investigator Robyn, is forced to reveal to Alicia he is leaving to form his own firm and invites her to join him.
89	21	"A More Perfect Union"	Michael Zinberg	Craig Turk	April 21, 2013	9.02
Alicia is volunteered by her mother Veronica to render legal assistance to one of Veronica's recently widowed friends. Initially expecting to only provide minimal assistance, Alicia enlists Cary's help, as she goes up against Nancy Crozier, and ends up representing more than 20 employees of a software company in their efforts to unionize to prevent their employer from firing them en masse. The case also inspires the firm's own clerical staff to seek better working conditions. Alicia's brother Owen has a change of heart regarding Alicia's marriage after Peter attempts to repair their relationship. Veronica, still disapproving of Alicia's continued commitment to Peter, attempts to interfere as Peter asks Alicia to renew their vows in Hawaii. Cary, still set on forming his own firm, tries to sign up Kalinda.
90	22	"What's in the Box?"	Robert King	Robert King & Michelle King	April 28, 2013	9.13
On the night of the Illinois gubernatorial election, Zach witnesses what he believes to be absentee ballot tampering. Once brought to the attention of an emergency courtroom hearing, however, the details turn out to be potentially ruinous for Peter's campaign rather than his opponent's. Alicia makes a decision regarding joining Cary's new firm. Cary is able to convince the firm's second investigator, Robyn, to join him after Kalinda refuses to take a lower offer.

== Reception ==
The fourth season of The Good Wife received critical acclaim. The review aggregator website Rotten Tomatoes reports a 96% rating based on 24 reviews. The critics consensus reads, "This season of The Good Wife continues its winning streak as one of television's top shows, with unique legal cases and intelligent political drama." On Metacritic, the fourth season currently sits at an 86 out of 100, based on five critics.

== Awards and nominations ==
=== Primetime Emmy Awards ===
- Nomination for Outstanding Supporting Actress in a Drama Series in a Drama Series (Christine Baranski for "The Seven Day Rule")
- Nomination for Outstanding Guest Actor in a Drama Series (Michael J. Fox for "Boom De Yah Da")
- Nomination for Outstanding Guest Actor in a Drama Series (Nathan Lane for "I Fought the Law")
- Won for Outstanding Guest Actress in a Drama Series (Carrie Preston for "Je Ne Sais What?")
- Nomination for Outstanding Casting for a Drama Series (Mark Saks)

== U.S. Nielsen ratings ==
Episode number	Title	Original airing	Rating	Share	Rating/share (18–49)	Total viewers (in millions)	Rank per week	Note
69 (4-01)	I Fought the Law	September 30, 2012	6.5	10	1.8	9.93	#26	
70 (4-02)	And the Law Won	October 7, 2012	5.9	8	1.7	8.94	#25	
71 (4-03)	Two Girls, One Code	October 14, 2012	6.1	9	1.7	9.12	#27	
72 (4-04)	Don't Haze Me, Bro	October 21, 2012	6.8	11	1.9	10.02	#19	
73 (4-05)	Waiting For the Knock	October 28, 2012	6.2	9	1.8	9.51	#28	
74 (4-06)	The Art of War	November 4, 2012	6.2	9	1.7	9.93	#25	
75 (4-07)	Anatomy of a Joke	November 11, 2012	6.1	9	1.7	9.02	#23	
76 (4-08)	Here Comes the Judge	November 18, 2012	6.6	10	1.7	9.94	#19	
77 (4-09)	A Defense of Marriage	November 25, 2012	6.3	9	1.6	9.45	#19	
78 (4-10)	Battle of the Proxies	December 2, 2012	6.5	10	1.8	9.70	#22	
79 (4-11)	Boom De Ya Da	January 6, 2013	6.5	10	1.8	9.96	#12	
80 (4-12)	Je Ne Sais What?	January 13, 2013	6.7	10	1.9	10.04	#14	
81 (4-13)	The Seven Day Rule	January 27, 2013	6.3	9	1.5	9.35	#15	
82 (4-14)	Red Team/Blue Team	February 17, 2013	5.5	8	1.3	8.35	#21	
83 (4-15)	Going for the Gold	March 3, 2013	5.9	9	1.6	8.99	#17	
84 (4-16)	Runnin' with the Devil	March 10, 2013	6.0	9	1.5	9.21	#13	
85 (4-17)	Invitation to an Inquest	March 17, 2013	6.0	9	1.5	9.08	#15	
86 (4-18)	Death of a Client	March 24, 2013	3.3	8	1.7	9.59	#12	
87 (4-19)	The Wheels of Justice	March 31, 2013	5.6	9	1.5	8.59	#15	
88 (4-20)	Rape: A Modern Perspective	April 14, 2013	6.7	11	1.7	10.14	#15	
89 (4-21)	A More Perfect Union	April 21, 2013	6.0	9	1.5	9.02	#13	
90 (4-22)	What's in the Box?	April 28, 2013	6.0	9	1.6	9.13	#18	
