= The Good Wife season 5 =

The Good Wife
- Season 5
- Season 5 U.S. DVD cover
- Starring: Julianna Margulies; Matt Czuchry; Archie Panjabi; Graham Phillips; Makenzie Vega; Alan Cumming; Matthew Goode; Zach Grenier; Josh Charles; Christine Baranski
- No. of episodes: 22

Release
- Original network: CBS
- Original release: September 29, 2013 – May 18, 2014

Season chronology
- ← Previous; Season 4 Next → Season 6

The fifth season of The Good Wife began airing on September 29, 2013. The season received critical acclaim, with the general consensus calling it the series's best season. The show's critical resurgence and creative renaissance won the season the TCA Award for Outstanding Achievement in Drama and the Writers Guild of America Award for Television: Episodic Drama.

== Cast ==
=== Main ===
- Julianna Margulies as Alicia Florrick
- Matt Czuchry as Cary Agos
- Archie Panjabi as Kalinda Sharma
- Makenzie Vega as Grace Florrick
- Graham Phillips as Zach Florrick
- Alan Cumming as Eli Gold
- Matthew Goode as Finn Polmar
- Zach Grenier as David Lee
- Josh Charles as Will Gardner
- Christine Baranski as Diane Lockhart

=== Recurring ===
- Chris Noth as Peter Florrick
- Jess Weixler as Robyn Burdine
- Jerry Adler as Howard Lyman
- Ben Rappaport as Carey Zepps
- Melissa George as Marilyn Garbanza
- Nathan Lane as Clarke Hayden
- Stockard Channing as Veronica Loy
- Mary Beth Peil as Jackie Florrick
- Michael J. Fox as Louis Canning
- Renée Elise Goldsberry as Geneva Pine
- Jason O'Mara as Damian Boyle
- Michael Cerveris as James Castro
- Jeffrey Tambor as Judge George Kluger
- Jordana Spiro as Jenna Vellete
- Hunter Parrish as Jeffrey Grant
- Eric Bogosian as Nelson Dubeck
- Christian Borle as Carter Schmidt
- Chris Butler as Matan Brody
- Carrie Preston as Elsbeth Tascioni
- Gary Cole as Kurt McVeigh
- Dallas Roberts as Owen Cavanaugh
- Michael Boatman as Julius Cain
- Miriam Shor as Mandy Post
- Mike Colter as Lemond Bishop
- Skipp Sudduth as Jim Moody
- John Benjamin Hickey as Neil Gross

=== Guest ===
- Malik Yoba as Eddie Fornum
- Molly Price as Lena Cesca
- Jeffrey DeMunn as Virgil Ryvlan
- Laura Benanti as Renata Ellard
- America Ferrera as Natalie Flores
- James LeGros as Judge Adam Tolkin
- Mary Stuart Masterson as Rachel Keyser
- Rita Wilson as Viola Walsh
- Dreama Walker as Becca
- Kurt Fuller as Judge Peter Dunaway
- Dylan Baker as Colin Sweeney
- Mamie Gummer as Nancy Crozier
- Jill Hennessy as Rayna Hecht

== Reception ==
The fifth season of The Good Wife received critical acclaim. On Rotten Tomatoes, it holds a 100% rating based on 25 reviews. The website's consensus reads, "The verdict is in: The Good Wife is a solid adult drama, with a delicately fine-tuned performance from Julianna Margulies and storylines that become increasingly absorbing as they progress."

James Poniewozik of TIME: "A civil war breaks out in the office, and 'Hitting the Fan' proves, if there was any doubt, why The Good Wife is currently the best thing on TV outside cable." Chris Harnick, News Editor of HuffPost TV, commented that "'Hitting The Fan' May Be The Best Episode Ever". Stephen Marche of Esquire wrote that the show is network TV's most intellectually ambitious, commenting "It's a rare show that starts to come into its own in the middle of its fifth season, but somehow CBS's The Good Wife has managed to do it. This season has been among the strongest I've seen, and the last two episodes may be the best television produced this year". Phil Dyess-Nugent of The A.V. Club wrote that "for four years now, it's been a great example of a network show refusing to calcify and settle into formula", citing the scene when Kalinda tells Robyn that 'Losing a job changes you', which he suggests "could be on this show's coat of arms". Patrick Freyne of the Irish Times wrote that the series is "the best-made, most nuanced show on television".

The season received three Golden Globe Award nominations, two TCA Award nominations, a field-leading five Critics' Choice Television Award nominations, and five Primetime Emmy Award nominations, including mentions for its stars Julianna Margulies, Josh Charles, and Christine Baranski. Margulies ended up winning the Primetime Emmy Award for Outstanding Lead Actress in a Drama Series for her performance in "The Last Call".

== Awards and nominations ==
=== Primetime Emmy Awards ===
- Won for Outstanding Lead Actress in a Drama Series (Julianna Margulies for "The Last Call")
- Nomination for Outstanding Supporting Actress in a Drama Series (Christine Baranski for "The Last Call")
- Nomination for Outstanding Supporting Actor in a Drama Series (Josh Charles for "Hitting the Fan")
- Nomination for Outstanding Guest Actor in a Drama Series (Dylan Baker for "Tying the Knot")
- Nomination for Outstanding Casting for a Drama Series (Mark Saks)

== Bruce Springsteen album promotion ==
During the January 12, 2014 episode, "We, the Juries", snippets of three songs from Bruce Springsteen's new album, High Hopes, which was released two days later, were featured. CBS struck a deal with Springsteen's record label to promote the new album, which will also be streamed through CBS.com from 10pm on January 12 to 7pm on January 13. Writer Keith Eisner, who is from Springsteen's home state of New Jersey said the deal came together after the season's 12th episode had been written and filmed, but not yet edited. He said when he heard of Springsteen's songs being used he literally jumped up and down in excitement. "High Hopes", "The Ghost of Tom Joad" and "Hunter of Invisible Game" were the songs featured at various points in the episode. CBS said this was a way to gain wider exposure for the album in an unconventional way, and lure his baby boomer fans to the show and the top-rated network's website.

== Episodes ==
No. overall	No. in season	Title	Directed by	Written by	Original release date	US viewers (millions)
91	1	"Everything Is Ending"	Robert King	Robert King & Michelle King	September 29, 2013	9.15
Setting out to form their own firm, Alicia and Cary finalize their exit from Lockhart & Gardner. Realizing that delaying would allow them to collect a hefty bonus payment, all the fourth-year associates vote to delay leaving by two more weeks. Diane and Will work with Alicia to prove a man innocent after his execution is botched by the state. The firm's partners, led by a very suspicious David Lee, begin to actively investigate the associates by scanning their phone records. Meanwhile, newly elected Governor Peter Florrick makes Eli his new chief of staff.
92	2	"The Bit Bucket"	Michael Zinberg	Ted Humphrey & Robert King	October 6, 2013	9.23
Neil Gross of internet giant Chum Hum seeks Lockhart & Gardner's help in fighting the NSA regarding its recently leaked PRISM surveillance program. The NSA, while actively eavesdropping on the firm's phone calls, discovers a possible link to terrorism in a former client of theirs. Alicia is visited again by her mother, who offers her help unexpectedly. Diane Lockhart, still being sought by Governor Florrick as his nominee for Supreme Court justice, is placed in a very difficult position as she is asked to disavow Will Gardner's past actions. Meanwhile, Eli tries to locate a golden gavel belonging to the Governor only to discover an old adversary has taken it.
93	3	"A Precious Commodity"	Brooke Kennedy	Keith Eisner	October 13, 2013	8.46
The firm is rocked by an interview Diane gave to a reporter in her efforts to secure the Supreme Court justice nomination. In the interview Diane reveals, in clear detail, Will's actions leading up to his suspension that occurred the previous year. The partners and Will move against Diane, wanting her to surrender her stake in the firm. Alicia represents a client (Genevieve Angelson) acting as a surrogate mother whose unborn baby suffers from a rare and severe chromosomal disability. The genetic parents wish to terminate the pregnancy, something the surrogate is refusing to do. Will, still unaware of Alicia's intentions to leave, makes an offer to Alicia to replace Diane as managing partner.
94	4	"Outside the Bubble"	Félix Alcalá	Robert King & Michelle King	October 20, 2013	8.99
As Diane prepares to move out of the firm to assume her judgeship, she also prepares to marry her longtime flame, Kurt McVeigh, which causes friction with Diane's old friends. Meanwhile, the firm is sued by one of their own paralegals for accommodating a hostile work environment, and she accuses many of the firm's lawyers of sexual harassment. The firm hires Elsbeth Tascioni to defend them against the suit. Eli must deal with Jackie as she attempts to take control of Peter's inauguration as Governor. Meanwhile, Diane becomes suspicious of Alicia after she catches her trying to download one of her client's files.
95	5	"Hitting the Fan"	James Whitmore Jr.	Robert King & Michelle King	October 27, 2013	9.35
Diane uncovers Alicia and Cary's plan to leave and start their own law firm. After revealing it to Will, who takes it very hard, Alicia is fired, along with all fourth-year associates. A frantic pursuit of clients begins as a result. Lockhart/Gardner imposes a restraining order on the new firm, preventing them from lobbying their biggest client, Chum-Hum. Florrick/Agos responds in kind as the two firms battle each other in and out of court, while relationships crumble. Meanwhile, Peter, after hearing of his wife's firing, helps Alicia secure a client and rescinds Diane's Illinois Supreme Court justice nomination.
96	6	"The Next Day"	Michael Zinberg	Leonard Dick	November 3, 2013	10.22
The day after Florrick/Agos split from Lockhart/Gardner, Alicia and Cary successfully take over Diane's last case that she was due to litigate before they left, but they must contend with Will and Diane's stalling to hand over client files. Will, seething and also energized from the previous day's events, moves to expand the reach of Lockhart/Gardner, and starts with trying to destabilize Florrick/Agos, preventing them from moving into new offices. Kalinda tricks Cary into exposing their office location and reveals Robyn as one of the traitors. Meanwhile, the director of the governor's Ethics Commission, Marilyn Garbanza, seeks to advise Alicia's new firm on ethical guidelines. After losing the Supreme Court justice nomination, Diane is welcomed back to the firm.
97	7	"The Next Week"	Frederick E.O. Toye	Craig Turk	November 10, 2013	10.26
Clarke Hayden, the former trustee who managed Lockhart/Gardner during its bankruptcy, returns to provide financial advice to Florrick/Agos as they face financial difficulties. Meanwhile, Florrick/Agos suspects Lockhart/Gardner is spying on them after Alicia's children discover that the cameras on their home computers are being accessed remotely. Will tries to keep a client from leaving the firm for Florrick/Agos, and in doing so has a chance encounter with Alicia's brother Owen, who attempts to provide insight as to why Alicia left the firm with Cary. In addition, Lockhart/Gardner tries to fight off a malpractice lawsuit regarding an apparent botched adoption on which, at the time, Alicia was working. Will also represents a client, Jeffrey Grant, who is stopped on trumped-up DUI charges and ends up being charged with murder.
98	8	"The Next Month"	Josh Charles	Ted Humphrey	November 17, 2013	9.72
Lockhart/Gardner, rebranding itself simply as "LG", plans to open a new branch in New York. Despite the lack of decor, Florrick/Agos finally moves into its own offices. Natalie Flores returns to Chicago to ask Alicia's help in defending an undocumented Mexican immigrant who is being threatened with deportation if he does not testify against a dangerous drug cartel lord. Marilyn, who notices Eli's renewed interest in Natalie, fears for the ethical implications of his relationship with her. Robyn, meanwhile, fearing for her own place at Florrick/Agos, seeks Kalinda's advice for becoming indispensable to the firm.
99	9	"Whack-a-Mole"	Kevin Hooks	Nichelle Tramble Spellman	November 24, 2013	9.70
Alicia and Cary represent a university lecturer accused of being a domestic terrorist by overzealous users of a social networking website. LG, being in need of more litigators, tries to hire more associates, but Will, disregarding the wishes of the rest of the firm's partners, hires an alleged maverick mob lawyer as a partner, who causes trouble for Florrick/Agos when he steals their office furniture. Will's impulsive decision to hire him arouses the concern of Diane, who instructs Kalinda to investigate the new partner. Jackie, realizing that Peter's new Supreme Court justice nominee slept with her own husband many years ago, tries to force the nominee to bow out.
100	10	"The Decision Tree"	Rosemary Rodriguez	Robert King & Michelle King	December 1, 2013	10.42
Alicia, on the verge of finalizing her exit from LG, discovers that she has been bequeathed millions of dollars by an eccentric and now-deceased client. His surviving wife however, contesting the bequest, hires LG to contest the will. Meanwhile Florrick/Agos, having received few RSVPs to their Christmas party, ask Alicia to invite her husband. Eli, who realizes certain undesirable clients might be in attendance, tries to stop Peter from attending. Kalinda, busy investigating LG's newest lawyer, ends up getting arrested. Meanwhile, in the case regarding Alicia's bequest, Clarke Hayden makes his debut at court. The case also dredges up passionate emotions for Will, who now questions how genuine Alicia's affections were for him.
101	11	"Goliath and David"	Brooke Kennedy	Luke Schelhaas	January 5, 2014	9.24
Alicia and Cary represent the band who played at their Christmas party in a copyright infringement lawsuit against a TV network regarding the covering of a song by a music show of another cover of a song the band made. Will, after hearing about it, involves himself in the suit, and Alicia and Will both attempt to throw each other off during the case. Diane, concerned about the frantic nature of the firm's recent moves, such as the expansion into New York and now Los Angeles, calls for a moratorium on soliciting new clients. Eli, after hiring Kalinda to investigate Marilyn regarding the father of her baby, uncovers video evidence of possible voter fraud committed during the gubernatorial election campaign Eli led.
102	12	"We, the Juries"	Paris Barclay	Keith Eisner	January 12, 2014	9.85
Alicia, Cary, Diane, and Will are forced to work together to keep a couple out of jail when they're accused of smuggling drugs. Formerly a Lockhart/Gardner case before Alicia and Cary left, Will and Alicia both request the case be severed for the two accused. The presiding judge grants their request for a severance, but only for the jury: which results in a double jury trial. Meanwhile, Eli attempts to shield himself from culpability after the leaking of a video depicting possible voter fraud to the press, while Marilyn begins an investigation, which involves questioning Will. Will, however is unable to cooperate fully due to Peter's refusal to waive attorney-client privilege. Kalinda attempts to reconnect with Cary but accidentally falls into a trap, which allows Florrick/Agos to poach a client from LG.
103	13	"Parallel Construction, Bitches"	Matt Shakman	Erica Shelton Kodish	March 9, 2014	8.94
Florrick/Agos and LG represent Lemond Bishop when he is arrested on a drug-related charge. However, the charge is based on information that could have only been known from within Florrick/Agos, and this prompts Cary and Alicia to conduct an investigation, which leads them to conclude their phones are being wiretapped by the DEA. They are in fact being surveilled, but by the NSA, which is sharing information with other government departments. Meanwhile, after Marylin submits an inconclusive report on her investigation into possible voter fraud, it escalates as the Department of Justice's Office of Public Integrity begins its own examination of the allegations and the video depicting the alleged crime, approaching Alicia and subpoenaing Will.
104	14	"A Few Words"	Rosemary Rodriguez	Leonard Dick	March 16, 2014	8.43
Alicia, Cary and Clarke are in New York for Alicia's keynote speech at a conference for the American Bar Association. Alicia struggles to compose a suitable speech, so she decides to draw upon her past for inspiration. In attendance is a prominent New York lawyer who is leaving her own firm and eagerly sought after by both Florrick/Agos and LG. Will, still being pursued by Nelson Dubeck from the Office of Public Integrity over possible voter fraud, decides to retain Elsbeth Tascioni to represent him in the investigation and a forthcoming grand jury hearing.
105	15	"Dramatics, Your Honor"	Brooke Kennedy	Robert King & Michelle King	March 23, 2014	9.12
Dubeck asks Alicia to submit to a voluntary deposition; Alicia agrees, having Cary act as her attorney. During the deposition, Dubeck claims Will is going to testify against Peter. Kalinda tells Will that she wants to leave LG, but not to work for Florrick/Agos; Will claims that they go through this routine every few months. Will is defending Jeffrey Grant at trial, who is suffering in general lockup, but refuses to accept protective solitary confinement. Kalinda finds evidence suggesting Grant's innocence; however, before she can bring it to court, Will sees more evidence of Grant being attacked and requests solitary confinement, which apparently causes Grant to snap. Diane is arguing another case in the courthouse when she and Kalinda hear several gunshots. Kalinda enters Will's courtroom, where she finds the prosecutor, Finn Polmar, holding Will; both were shot and Will is unconscious. Grant is holding the gun, trying to kill himself, but the gun is out of bullets. At the hospital, Diane and Kalinda find Will's body. The episode ends with Kalinda calling Eli and Alicia, who are at a media event, to inform them of Will's death.
106	16	"The Last Call"	Jim McKay	Robert King & Michelle King	March 30, 2014	10.96
In the wake of Will's death, Alicia grieves over him, distancing herself from her husband Peter in the process. She finds a voicemail that Will left her; due to an interruption, though, it said nothing substantial. Trying to determine what Will wanted to say, Alicia interviews the presiding judge who witnessed the shooting, and she talks to ASA Finn Polmar, who was also shot, and Polmar's assistant. Ultimately, she arrives at a dead end and is left to guess. Kalinda tries to understand why Will's client, Jeffrey Grant, went on a shooting spree. Diane breaks the news of Will's death to the partners at her firm, while David Lee tries to keep Will's top clients from leaving. Forced to do a deposition without Alicia, Cary takes out his anger on opposing counsel.
107	17	"A Material World"	Griffin Dunne	Craig Turk	April 13, 2014	9.83
After attending Will's funeral, Alicia and Diane establish a newfound rapport while reflecting over Will's life. They even consider merging their firms together, despite currently opposing each other in a divorce suit. Meanwhile alleged mob lawyer, Damien Boyle, overhearing their conversation, informs David Lee of it and both try to remove Diane as managing partner. Kalinda decides to help Diane after learning of their plans. Alicia, fearing that the newly appointed state's attorney could be searching for a scapegoat over the botched Jeffery Grant prosecution, offers Finn Polmar her advice. After being visited by Peter, who is concerned with how she is coping with Will's death, Alicia decides to distance herself even more from him.
108	18	"All Tapped Out"	Félix Alcalá	Julia Wolfe & Matthew Montoya	April 20, 2014	9.15
The proposal to merge LG with Florrick/Agos is scuttled as Diane has a change of heart after speaking about it with Cary, who is vexed he wasn't sooner informed by Alicia. LG's partners decide to merge with Louis Canning's firm, forming Lockhart/Gardner & Canning (retaining the late Will Gardner's name). While incredulous to Canning's intentions, Diane eventually agrees to work with him. After being approached by an NSA independent contractor who accidentally removed a USB flash drive with possibly classified documents, Florrick/Agos realize that their firm is being surveilled by the NSA. Alicia informs Eli and Peter, who later uses his connections to halt the surveillance. Cary and Clarke both try to save the job of the NSA contractor after he is subsequently suspended from his role at the NSA. Alicia continues to defend Finn Polmar against the state's attorney office, representing him in a disciplinary hearing into his past prosecutions.
109	19	"Tying the Knot"	Josh Charles	Nichelle Tramble Spellman	April 27, 2014	9.33
Alicia inadvertently becomes a witness to a homicide while in Colin Sweeney's house trying to get him to sign important business documents during his engagement party. Sweeney's fiancé, Renata is arrested for the murder. Being a lawyer representing Colin Sweeney, Alicia cannot defend Renata, so Alicia refers Renata to Diane to represent her instead. The state's attorney becomes personally involved, first appointing Finn Polmar to prosecute at the last minute, only to pull him off soon after. Still trying to assist Finn, Alicia suggests that Finn run for state's attorney to protect his job, and after she gets Eli to gather the requisite signatures, Peter decides to endorse Finn. Meanwhile, Eli must deal with a picture of Zach holding a bong, and the ensuing controversy when Alicia's brother Owen, decides to offer up his own opinion on drug use.
110	20	"The Deep Web"	Brooke Kennedy	Luke Schelhaas & Erica Shelton Kodish	May 4, 2014	8.98
While on jury duty, Alicia has a chance encounter with a fellow juror, who later invites her to drinks. During a day off, she decides to meet with her mother, Veronica. Diane defends a client whose son is accused of abetting the sale of drugs online on the anonymous marketplace Silk Road, after bitcoins are traced to his computer. Kalinda's investigation reveals information that prompts Diane to withdraw from the case. Eli, concerned about Finn's lack of an organized campaign (or even a campaign manager) for the state's attorney election, decides to arrange a TV interview for him. Meanwhile, with help from Kalinda, Diane realizes that David Lee and Louis Canning (who is now terminally ill) are moving against her.
111	21	"The One Percent"	Rosemary Rodriguez	Ted Humphrey	May 11, 2014	8.73
Alicia and Cary represent a billionaire who, in trying to settle a wrongful termination suit, ends up making insensitive comments that scuttle the settlement and jeopardizes their chances of prevailing in voir dire. Eli, still assisting Finn in his campaign, reveals that Finn has been cleared of all wrongdoing in the Jeffrey Grant shooting; the state's attorney, James Castro, is named as the one responsible. In an attempt to protect his own campaign, Castro presents Peter with a photo of Finn exiting Alicia's apartment, insinuating that the two are having sex. Eli learns of the true nature of Alicia's and Peter's marriage after reprimanding a government intern for getting too close to Peter. Diane and Canning are at odds with each other again after they realize that a conflict of interest exists between Diane's new co-counsel on a class action lawsuit and Canning's newest client, the defendant in the class-action lawsuit.
112	22	"A Weird Year"	Robert King	Robert King & Michelle King	May 18, 2014	9.14
Eli tries to get Finn Polmar to withdraw from the state's attorney race after he uncovers evidence that he may have bribed another prosecutor to save his sister from jail. Jackie and Veronica clash as each vies to cook dinner for Zach's graduation party; Jackie finally learns the truth of Peter's and Alicia's marriage. After a live-streamed deposition, Lockart/Gardner & Canning leave their conference room camera on, which allows Florrick/Agos an opportunity to eavesdrop. After Finn withdraws, Peter decides to offer Diane the chance to take his place. Alicia and Cary argue heatedly after the proposal to merge with Lockhart/Gardner & Canning resurfaces. Canning, after being thwarted in his attempts to buy Howard Lyman's vote, threatens to dissolve Lockhart/Gardner & Canning if Diane does not give up her managing partnership, which prompts her to try to join Florrick/Agos. Alicia bids Zach farewell as he embarks on a summer internship after graduating from high school. Eli, in a last-minute decision, proposes that Alicia run for state's attorney.

== U.S. Nielsen ratings ==
Episode number	Title	Original airing	Rating	Share	Rating/share (18–49)	Total viewers (millions)	Rank per week	Note
91 (5-01)	Everything Is Ending	September 29, 2013	–	–	1.5	9.150	-	
92 (5-02)	The Bit Bucket	October 6, 2013	–	–	1.6	9.230	–	
93 (5-03)	A Precious Commodity	October 13, 2013	–	–	1.2	8.933	# 24	
94 (5–04)	Outside the Bubble	October 20, 2013	–	–	1.4	8.990	-	
95 (5-05)	Hitting the Fan	October 27, 2013	–	–	1.4	9.350	-	
96 (5-06)	The Next Day	November 3, 2013	-	–	1.6	10.217	#16	
97 (5-07)	The Next Week	November 10, 2013	–	–	1.7	10.260	#17	
98 (5-08)	The Next Month	November 17, 2013	–	–	1.4	9.720	#22	
99 (5-09)	Whack-a-Mole	November 24, 2013	–	–	1.3	9.700	#22	
100 (5–10)	The Decision Tree	December 1, 2013	–	–	1.6	10.417	#17	
101 (5–11)	Goliath and David	January 5, 2014	–	–	1.4	9.24	#8	
102 (5–12)	We, the Juries	January 12, 2014	–	–	1.8	9.847	#13	
103 (5–13)	Parallel Construction, Bitches	March 9, 2014	–	–	1.2	8.963	#22	–
104 (5–14)	A Few Words	March 16, 2014	–	–	1.3	8.432	#23	–
105 (5–15)	Dramatics, Your Honor	March 23, 2014	–	–	1.3	9.123	#15	-
106 (5–16)	The Last Call	March 30, 2014	–	–	1.8	10.96	#8	-
107 (5-17)	A Material World	April 13, 2014	-	-	1.5	9.833	#13	-
108 (5-18)	All Tapped Out	April 20, 2014	-	-	1.3	9.147	#11	-
109 (5-19)	Tying the Knot	April 27, 2014	–	–	1.3	9.330	#15	–
110 (5–20)	The Deep Web	May 4, 2014	–	–	1.1	8.988	#16	–
111 (5–21)	The One Percent	May 11, 2014	–	–	1.2	8.731	#16	–
112 (5–22)	A Weird Year	May 18, 2014	–	–	1.2	9.135	#17	–
