= The Good Wife season 6 =

The Good Wife
- Season 6
- Season 6 U.S. DVD cover
- Starring: Julianna Margulies; Matt Czuchry; Archie Panjabi; Graham Phillips; Makenzie Vega; Alan Cumming; Matthew Goode; Zach Grenier; Christine Baranski
- No. of episodes: 22

Release
- Original network: CBS
- Original release: September 21, 2014 – May 10, 2015

Season chronology
- ← Previous; Season 5 Next → Season 7

The sixth season of The Good Wife began airing on September 21, 2014, on CBS, and concluded on May 10, 2015. It consists of 22 episodes.

== Premise ==
The series focuses on Alicia Florrick (Margulies), whose husband Peter (Noth), the former Cook County, Illinois State's Attorney, has been jailed following a notorious political corruption and sex scandal. After having spent the previous thirteen years as a stay-at-home mother, Alicia returns to the workforce as a litigator to provide for her two children.

== Cast ==
=== Main ===
- Julianna Margulies as Alicia Florrick
- Matt Czuchry as Cary Agos
- Archie Panjabi as Kalinda Sharma
- Graham Phillips as Zach Florrick
- Makenzie Vega as Grace Florrick
- Alan Cumming as Eli Gold
- Matthew Goode as Finn Polmar
- Zach Grenier as David Lee
- Christine Baranski as Diane Lockhart

=== Recurring ===
- Chris Noth as Peter Florrick
- Sarah Steele as Marissa Gold
- Steven Pasquale as Johnny Elfman
- Mike Colter as Lemond Bishop
- David Hyde Pierce as Frank Prady
- Michael Cerveris as James Castro
- Michael J. Fox as Louis Canning
- David Krumholtz as Josh Mariner
- Renée Elise Goldsberry as Geneva Pine
- Ben Rappaport as Carey Zepps
- Jerry Adler as Howard Lyman
- Connie Nielsen as Ramona Lytton
- Jill Flint as Lana Delaney
- Linda Lavin as Joy Grubick
- Taye Diggs as Dean Levine-Wilkins
- Oliver Platt as Reese Dipple
- Mary Beth Peil as Jackie Florrick
- Jess Weixler as Robyn Burdine
- Dallas Roberts as Owen Cavanaugh
- Carrie Preston as Elsbeth Tascioni
- Kyle MacLachlan as Josh Perotti
- Chris Butler as Matan Brody
- Gary Cole as Kurt McVeigh
- Edward Asner as Guy Redmayne
- J. D. Williams as Dexter Roja
- Tim Guinee as Andrew Wiley
- David Paymer as Judge Richard Cuesta

=== Guest ===
- Michael Boatman as Julius Cain
- Christian Borle as Carter Schmidt
- Denis O'Hare as Judge Charles Abernathy
- Jill Flint as Lana Delaney
- Dylan Baker as Colin Sweeney
- Ana Gasteyer as Judge Patrice Lessner
- Kurt Fuller as Judge Peter Dunaway
- Rita Wilson as Viola Walsh
- John Benjamin Hickey as Neil Gross
- Miriam Shor as Mandy Post
- Stockard Channing as Veronica Loy
- Laura Benanti as Renata Ellard
- Ron Rifkin as Spencer Randolph
- Kelli Giddish as Sophia Russo

== Episodes ==
No. overall	No. in season	Title	Directed by	Written by	Original release date	US viewers (millions)
113	1	"The Line"	Robert King	Robert King & Michelle King	September 21, 2014	11.06
Cary is arrested, charged with helping trafficking $1.3 million worth of heroin. Florrick/Agos struggle to come up with the bail money. Kalinda investigates on her own and re-acquaints herself with an old contact connected with the case. Diane's offer to join Florrick/Agos stands on the condition she gets an equal vote with Alicia and Cary. David Lee and Louis Canning get suspicious of Diane when she declares her intention to retire. Cary is held in jail, with bail set at $1.3 million and Florrick/Agos struggles to come up with the funds, when they are provided by a drug dealer client of Alicia's. Against Alicia's wishes, Eli conducts polling on any potential campaign for the State's Attorney office for Alicia and discovers that Alicia has a very good chance of winning against the incumbent. He schemes to get Peter's approval.
114	2	"Trust Issues"	Jim McKay	Ted Humphrey	September 28, 2014	11.09
Alicia takes over one of Cary's cases, which involves Neil Gross's wife, who having been made General Counsel of Chum Hum becomes concerned over Cary's arrest. Alicia must also find a new source for Cary's bail money, which is withdrawn after she is unable to prevent Bishop getting subpoenaed over Finn's source of funds dispute. Kalinda's investigation into the wire recording that implicates Cary takes a bad turn as one witness is killed by Bishop, who mistook him for the confidential informant. Diane, on the verge of retiring from Lockhart/Gardner & Canning, attempts to get a partner, Dean, to come with her to Florrick/Agos. Eli, meanwhile, now having Peter's approval to pursue Alicia's State's Attorney campaign, again tries to convince Alicia to run.
115	3	"Dear God"	Brooke Kennedy	Luke Schelhaas	October 5, 2014	10.83
Cary's bail is in jeopardy when the State applies to revoke bail after a key witness, a confidential informant, disappears. A pre-trial service officer must determine whether he continues to remain free. Florrick/Agos handle a case whereby the defendant and the plaintiff, both neighbors, try to resolve a patent infringement case outside traditional court – instead seeking a resolution inside "Christian Arbitration", whereby Biblical teachings are used to guide a conclusion. Alicia, constantly annoyed by people who think she is running for State's Attorney, tries to squelch all the speculation when a chance encounter with Gloria Steinem and veiled threats from the State's Attorney give her pause to reconsider.
116	4	"Oppo Research"	Matt Shakman	Robert King & Michelle King	October 12, 2014	10.39
Eli meets with Alicia to discuss 'oppositional research' that he has conducted and arranges for her to meet her new campaign manager, Jonny Elfman, who advises her to drop Lemond Bishop as a client, which is something he refuses until he discovers from Kalinda that Alicia could be running for State's Attorney. The research uncovers that Neesa, her son Zach's then-girlfriend, had an abortion last year; her brother Owen is sleeping with a married gay porn actor, her mother Veronica spanked another parent's child in a department store and that Castro plans to use a photo of Finn Polmar exiting Alicia's apartment to suggest that they are lovers. Alicia tries to address them before any of these issues can affect her campaign. Eli also finally discovers Peter slept with Kalinda while he was State's Attorney.
117	5	"Shiny Objects"	Frederick E.O. Toye	Keith Eisner	October 19, 2014	10.88
Alicia is pitted against eccentric lawyer Elsbeth Tascioni who now represents a corporation against its former CEO, who alleges unfair dismissal due to gender discrimination. During the trial, all the files on Florrick/Agos computer systems are maliciously encrypted by ransomware, which demands $50,000 for the decryption key. After making the payment, Diane accidentally provides her old LG e-mail address for the decryption key, which forces her to return to David Lee to ask for it back; while there Diane also discovers that LG's building lease is still signed to her. Kalinda reconnects with FBI Agent Delaney, and they both help defeat the ransomware by tracking down the author. Alicia and Peter clash when Peter insists that Alicia disinvite Finn Polmar from introducing her at her first press conference for her campaign.
118	6	"Old Spice"	James Whitmore Jr.	Leonard Dick	October 26, 2014	10.21
Alicia is urged by her campaign manager Johnny to conduct an interview with Pastor Jeremiah to try to convince him that she is no longer an atheist or at least, someone who is "struggling". Alicia draws upon her daughter's faith in Christianity for help. Eli's daughter Marissa also becomes Alicia's "body woman" or personal assistant. Diane attempts to evict Lockhart/Gardner & Canning from their existing offices. Alicia and Elsbeth, putting aside their previous lawsuit, band together to fight AUSA Josh Perotti's charge of intellectual property theft against Alicia's client, which evolves into economic espionage. Cary is spot checked by his pre-trial service officer and is re-arrested after he inadvertently leaves the state of Illinois, violating his bail conditions.
119	7	"Message Discipline"	Matt Shakman	Craig Turk	November 2, 2014	10.45
While preparing for Cary's prosecution, Finn Polmar digs into Cary's history while working at the State's Attorney office under Peter. Finn uncovers while deputy State's Attorney, Cary personally checked-out two kilograms of cocaine, before it went missing. Kalinda urges Cary to subpoena Governor Florrick, as Cary was only acting under his orders when he was State's Attorney. While investigating, Kalinda finds Trey Wagner, the missing witness who was originally to testify against Cary. Finn accuses Castro of only wanting to discredit Alicia Florrick, and resigns as a prosecutor. Peter asks Eli to appoint him a new personal attorney, someone who turns out to be a family friend of the Florricks. Alicia is interviewed by a legal commentator, Frank Prady, who also wants to run for State's Attorney.
120	8	"Red Zone"	Félix Alcalá	Nichelle Tramble Spellman	November 9, 2014	10.72
Alicia's campaign for State's Attorney speeds up after Frank Prady's announcement. Eli and Elfman conduct a political focus group regarding her likeability. Meanwhile, Alicia takes on a rape case of one of Owen's students that moves a university hearing to civil court, where she faces Louis Canning. Through discovery, Cary and Diane finally hear the wiretap audio that implicates him in the drug trafficking charge; Cary and Diane practice cross-examination in an attempt to rebut it. Alicia annoys Eli after she volunteers at a soup kitchen and is photographed awkwardly. Incumbent State's Attorney Castro withdraws from the election and Finn begins his own private practice, leasing office space underneath Florrick/Agos & Lockhart.
121	9	"Sticky Content"	Michael Zinberg	Robert King & Michelle King	November 16, 2014	10.55
The State's Attorney race gets negative with Alicia facing a crisis of conscience regarding her campaign media strategy when Frank Prady proposes that neither goes dirty on each other. Frank also provides Alicia with campaign dirt that Castro gathered before leaving the race. Cary is approached by the FBI to collaborate with them in their own separate investigation of Lemond Bishop. Agent Delany presents Cary a wiretap of Bishop apparently discussing Cary's murder. Diane asks Kalinda to investigate to determine its authenticity and hires a bodyguard for Cary, something Bishop notices. Cary attempts to personally convince Bishop that he is no threat. Alicia confronts Peter over his apparent affair with his personal attorney, Ramona.
122	10	"The Trial"	Frederick E.O. Toye	Robert King & Michelle King	November 23, 2014	10.26
The date has come for Cary's day in court. The prosecution offers him a deal that makes him consider serving jail time. Alicia's campaign runs into trouble after she makes a joke on paper threatening to kill a teacher at her daughter's school. Eli and Johnny scramble to spin it into something positive, but pressure Alicia into offering patronage to subside the potential controversy, something she is unwilling to do. With Finn's help, Kalinda tries to assist Cary, but it ends up backfiring.
123	11	"Hail Mary"	Rosemary Rodriguez	Erica Shelton Kodish	January 4, 2015	10.36
Preparing for his imminent incarceration after pleading guilty to a lesser conspiracy charge, Cary hires a prison consultant in an attempt to ameliorate the first few weeks of his imprisonment. Trying to assist Cary, Kalinda finds a probable lead which indicates the State's Attorney may have buried exculpatory evidence in an apparent violation of Brady disclosure case law. Alicia prepares for her upcoming debate, and goes against an English University Professor, Finn Polmar and Governor Florrick in mock debate preparations. Alicia's campaign manager Johnny and Eli clash during the mock debate when Peter mock debates Alicia.
124	12	"The Debate"	Brooke Kennedy	Robert King & Michelle King	January 11, 2015	9.58
Alicia takes on Frank Prady in their first televised debate for the State's Attorney race, which gets interrupted by the jury verdict of two police officers charged with unlawfully killing a black man. During the interruption Alicia and Frank hold an impromptu debate. Governor Florrick visits the unfolding protest alongside Pastor Isaiah attempting to forestall any potential violence. Eli tries to distract the press away from a developing scandal regarding Ramona and Peter. Diane and Cary intervene to manage Neil Gross's divorce settlement talks with David Lee, but end up losing. Alicia confronts Diane and Cary after they make a major decision without her.
125	13	"Dark Money"	Jim McKay	Keith Eisner	March 1, 2015	9.09
Alicia's firm handles a defamation suit for Colin Sweeney who accuses a TV production company of defaming him with the depiction of a character very much like him murdering his wife. The defence argues it isn't defamation because it is true. Kalinda is asked by Lemond Bishop to pick up his son from school, and Kalinda witnesses first hand how he struggles with single parenthood. Alicia successfully lobbies for the campaign donations of a wealthy but crass and uncouth figure, much to Prady's annoyance and her own regret.
126	14	"Mind's Eye"	Robert King	Robert King & Michelle King	March 8, 2015	9.09
Recovering from laryngitis, Alicia tries to prepare herself mentally for an interview with the editorial board of a conservative but Democratic-supporting newspaper in an attempt to gain their endorsement in the State's Attorney campaign. Imagining the different topics and questions that may be broached, Alicia grapples with the knowledge that Lemond Bishop contributed to and set up her PAC, a fact that is potentially ruinous for her campaign. She must also simultaneously help her firm deal with a wrongful eviction lawsuit from Louis Canning's firm, who the day before depositions, is hospitalized.
127	15	"Open Source"	Rosemary Rodriguez	Craig Turk	March 15, 2015	8.85
Alicia is advised by her campaign advisers to go negative against Peter during his time as State's Attorney as a way of buffering herself against attacks on him by Prady. Eli finds out and warns Elfman to advise her not to criticise Peter. Finn teams up with Diane to represent a client in a civil suit who was injured by the misfiring of a 3D-printed plastic gun. Diane's husband Kurt McVeigh acts as an expert witness, but finds conflicting motivations with his wife. Louis Canning, who is still hospitalized, grants Alicia power of attorney to liquidate most of his assets and donate the money to the family of a deceased girl who donated her kidney to him.
128	16	"Red Meat"	Michael Zinberg	Nichelle Tramble Spellman	March 22, 2015	8.43
Diane goes on a hunting trip alongside her husband, which provides a unique opportunity for her to solicit a wealthy client. On the election day of the State's Attorney race, Peter evokes Alicia's displeasure after he delivers a speech which negatively affects voter turnout. Kalinda, continuing her role as driver to Lemond's Bishop son, Dylan, discovers she is being investigated by the State's Attorney office.
129	17	"Undisclosed Recipients"	James Whitmore Jr.	Leonard Dick	March 29, 2015	8.88
Having won the State's Attorney race, Alicia must negotiate her exit package with her partners. In addition, people who contributed to Alicia's campaign attempt to call in favors as quid pro quo for their campaign contributions; Eli educates Alicia on the proper way to handle them. Lemond Bishop pressures Alicia into quashing an ongoing SA investigation into him. Diane, Cary and Julius litigate a suit against the founder of a website, during which the firm's emails are hacked, exposing the unseemly opinions the firm's partners have of their clients and one another.
130	18	"Loser Edit"	Brooke Kennedy	Luke Schelhaas	April 5, 2015	7.83
Alicia agrees to engage in a TV interview, when hacked emails revealing Alicia's affair with Will are sent to the press. Eli contrives ways to pre-empt the public fallout, by "pre-spinning" the emails as merely a flirtatious dalliance. Peter also advises Alicia on the potential scandal and gives an interview to assist Alicia. An internal affairs investigation catches on to Kalinda's forgery of metadata that was inadvertently submitted as evidence that prompted Cary's earlier release from jail. Diane engages in a mock trial for a wealthy new conservative client indecisive as to whether he should fund an appeal for a wedding planner who was found guilty of discrimination against a gay couple.
131	19	"Winning Ugly"	Rosemary Rodriguez	Erica Shelton Kodish	April 12, 2015	8.75
Diane is shocked to discover that she submitted falsified evidence in Cary's trial. Along with Kalinda, she immediately admits her mistake to the Police Review Board, but is faced with charges of obstruction of justice if she does not agree to testify against Lemond Bishop. Alicia is shocked to learn that voting machines were implanted with hacking microchips that apparently attempted to divert votes from Frank Prady to Alicia. The Election Review Board is prompted to investigate and she is offered representation from a respected civil rights lawyer by the Democratic Party.
132	20	"The Deconstruction"	Ted Humphrey	Ted Humphrey	April 26, 2015	8.74
After being betrayed by her own lawyer before the Electoral Review Board, Alicia formally withdraws her name from the State's Attorney race and approaches Diane, Cary and David Lee to return as a partner to the firm, which has already been renamed Lockhart, Agos and Lee. Due to a misunderstanding, Alicia ends up believing they are being insincere and follows Peter and Finn's advice to consider starting her own firm. Kalinda attempts to deflect the State's Attorney away from Diane and herself by agreeing to turn over evidence on Bishop. Diane agrees to argue a test case for Reese Dipple against mandatory minimum sentencing.
133	21	"Don't Fail"	Nelson McCormick	Robert King & Michelle King	May 3, 2015	8.35
Alicia interviews a ghostwriter to possibly author her memoirs. In addition, Alicia tries coping with being unemployed and ends up inadvertently reconnecting with an old client who is now being charged with murder after Alicia successfully defended him six years ago from an attempted murder charge. Alicia agrees to defend him again, with Cary's and Finn's help. The case itself prompts Alicia to consider starting her own firm again.
134	22	"Wanna Partner?"	Robert King	Robert King & Michelle King	May 10, 2015	9.35
Peter reveals to Alicia his intent to run for vice president. Peter insists he will not run unless his entire family approves, something Alicia doubts. Alicia receives a voicemail from a client that indicates he was in the midst of being arrested; unable to find an official record of him being booked, she suspects he is being held at an unofficial black site. Alicia and Finn, who agree to be partners, try to get him out by filing a writ of habeas corpus. Charles Lester, Lemond Bishop's personal attorney, starts snooping around trying to find Kalinda after she disappears. Alicia expresses her disapproval to Eli after he tries to direct the depiction of Alicia in her memoirs as being more domesticated, much to her displeasure. Finn tells Alicia that he's reconciling with his estranged wife and then decides that a partnership with her will not work as there is too much sexual tension between them. David Lee discovers Louis Canning's wife, Simone, now works at the firm as a paralegal, and both he and Cary want to fire her, something Diane as senior partner does. This angers Canning, who vows to destroy the firm and in the last scene asks Alicia if she wants a legal partner.

== U.S. ratings ==
Episode number	Title	Original airing	Household Rating/share	18–49 Rating/share	DVR Viewers	Total Viewers (millions)	Viewers Rank	Refs
113 (6-01)	The Line	September 21, 2014	7.3 / 13	1.4 / 4	—N/a	—N/a	9	
114 (6-02)	Trust Issues	September 28, 2014	7.3 / 11	1.3 / 4	2.538	13.598	17	
115 (6-03)	Dear God	October 5, 2014	7.0 / 11	1.4 / 4	3.097	14.018	16	
116 (6-04)	Oppo Research	October 12, 2014	6.6 / 10	1.3 / 3	2.711	13.103	16	
117 (6-05)	Shiny Objects	October 19, 2014	7.0 / 11	1.4 / 3	2.818	13.700	17	
118 (6-06)	Old Spice	October 26, 2014	6.7 / 11	1.5 / 4	2.745	12.958	18	
119 (6-07)	Message Discipline	November 2, 2014	6.9 / 12	1.4 / 3	2.979	13.429	15	
120 (6-08)	Red Zone	November 9, 2014	7.0 / 11	1.4 / 4	2.516	13.234	12	
121 (6-09)	Sticky Content	November 16, 2014	6.9 / 10	1.3 / 3	2.60	13.15	14	
122 (6–10)	The Trial	November 23, 2014	6.7 / 11	1.4 / 4	2.789	13.050	15	
123 (6–11)	Hail Mary	January 4, 2015	6.6 / 10	1.3 / 4	2.677	13.040	7	
124 (6–12)	The Debate	January 11, 2015	6.1 / 11	1.4 / 4	3.098	12.674	19	
125 (6–13)	Dark Money	March 1, 2015	5.7 / 9	1.1 / 3	2.949	12.035	18	
126 (6–14)	Mind's Eye	March 8, 2015	5.8 / 9	1.0 / 3	2.03	11.12	20	
127 (6–15)	Open Source	March 15, 2015	5.8 / 9	1.0 / 3	2.12	10.97	22	
128 (6–16)	Red Meat	March 22, 2015	5.5 / 9	1.0 / 3	1.989	10.421	15	
129 (6–17)	Undisclosed Recipients	March 29, 2015	5.9 / 9	1.0 / 3	1.29	10.17	13	
130 (6–18)	Loser's Edit	April 5, 2015	5.2 / 9	1.0 / 3	1.58	9.41	21	
131 (6–19)	Winning Ugly	April 12, 2015	5.7 / 9	1.1 / 4	2.196	10.941	16	
132 (6-20)	The Deconstruction	April 26, 2015	5.8 / 9	1.0 / 3	2.170	10.906	19	
133 (6-21)	Don't Fail	May 3, 2015	5.4 / 9	0.9 / 3	2.242	10.592	19	
134 (6-22)	Wanna Partner?	May 10, 2015	TBA	1.2 / 4	TBA	TBA	8	

== Reception ==
The sixth season of The Good Wife received critical acclaim. The review aggregator website Rotten Tomatoes reports an 100% rating based on 30 reviews. The website's consensus reads, "Though in its sixth season, The Good Wife remains one of network television's best shows with sharp writing, vibrant characters, and high production values." On Metacritic, the sixth season currently sits at an 89 out of 100, based on nine critics.
