= The Good Wife season 7 =

The Good Wife
- Season 7
- Season 7 U.S. DVD cover
- Starring: Julianna Margulies; Matt Czuchry; Alan Cumming; Cush Jumbo; Makenzie Vega; Zach Grenier; Graham Phillips; Jeffrey Dean Morgan; Christine Baranski
- No. of episodes: 22

Release
- Original network: CBS
- Original release: October 4, 2015 – May 8, 2016

Season chronology
- ← Previous; Season 6

The seventh and final season of The Good Wife was ordered on May 11, 2015, by CBS. It premiered on October 4, 2015, on CBS and consisted of 22 episodes. A promotional advertisement for the series that aired during Super Bowl 50 announced that the seventh season would be its last.

== Premise ==
The series focuses on Alicia Florrick (Julianna Margulies), whose husband Peter (Chris Noth), the former Cook County, Illinois state's attorney, has been jailed following a notorious political corruption and sex scandal. After having spent the previous thirteen years as a stay-at-home mother, Alicia returns to the workforce as a litigator to provide for her two children.

== Cast ==
=== Main ===
- Julianna Margulies as Alicia Florrick
- Matt Czuchry as Cary Agos
- Alan Cumming as Eli Gold
- Cush Jumbo as Lucca Quinn
- Makenzie Vega as Grace Florrick
- Zach Grenier as David Lee
- Graham Phillips as Zach Florrick
- Jeffrey Dean Morgan as Jason Crouse
- Christine Baranski as Diane Lockhart

=== Recurring ===
- Margo Martindale as Ruth Eastman
- Chris Noth as Peter Florrick
- Jerry Adler as Howard Lyman
- Christopher McDonald as Judge Don Schakowsky
- Nicole Roderick as Nora
- Michael J. Fox as Louis Canning
- Sarah Steele as Marissa Gold
- Nikki M. James as Monica Timmons
- Mary Beth Peil as Jackie Florrick
- Chris Butler as Matan Brody
- Will Patton as Mike Tascioni
- Matthew Morrison as Connor Fox
- Vanessa L. Williams as Courtney Paige
- Stockard Channing as Veronica Loy
- Mike Pniewski as Frank Landau
- Peter Gallagher as Ethan Carver
- Brian Muller as Brian Carter
- Rob Bartlett as Bernie Bukovitz
- Dallas Roberts as Owen Cavanaugh
- Gary Cole as Kurt McVeigh
- Kurt Fuller as Judge Peter Dunaway
- Dominic Chianese as Judge Michael Marx
- Mo Rocca as Ted Willoughby
- Megan Hilty as Holly Westfall
- David Paymer as Judge Richard Cuesta

=== Guest ===
- Christian Borle as Carter Schmidt
- Amy Irving as Phyllis Barsetto
- Mamie Gummer as Nancy Crozier
- Bridget Regan as Madeline Smulders
- John Magaro as Roland Hlavin
- Luke Kirby as Harry McGrath
- Justine Lupe as Maggie Rossum
- Dan Lauria as Ronnie Erickson
- David Krumholtz as Josh Mariner
- John Benjamin Hickey as Neil Gross
- Joey Slotnick as Anthony Dudewitz
- Patrick Breen as Captain Terrence Hicks
- Carrie Preston as Elsbeth Tascioni
- Denis O'Hare as Judge Charles Abernathy
- Anna Camp as Caitlyn D'Arcy
- Zach Woods as Jeff Dellinger
- Renée Elise Goldsberry as Geneva Pine
- Josh Charles as Will Gardner

== Episodes ==
| No. overall | No. in season | Title | Directed by | Written by | Original release date | US viewers (millions) |
|---|---|---|---|---|---|---|
| 135 | 1 | "Bond" | Brooke Kennedy | Robert King & Michelle King | October 4, 2015 | 9.25 |
Alicia attempts to revive her law career by working as a bond court attorney, representing indigent defendants and practicing privately. In her first day at bond court, she befriends a fellow attorney, Lucca Quinn, who passes cases off to her as a favor. Meanwhile, Louis Canning tries to attract Alicia to work for him, but she rejects the offer, which makes him set Alicia's next case up against Diane and David Lee, unbeknownst to her. After Alicia agrees to support it, Peter rushes to launch his VP campaign, deciding to fire Eli and hire a national campaign manager, Ruth Eastman. Eli decides to seek revenge against Peter and Ruth by becoming Alicia's campaign manager and revive her image. At Lockhart, Agos & Lee, Cary laments the outmoded work culture and decides to open up to the younger associates.
| 136 | 2 | "Innocents" | Jim McKay | Craig Turk | October 11, 2015 | 8.82 |
Alicia argues a case regarding the vandalism of a museum photo, which escalates into a potentially lucrative civil dispute between a son and his mother's attempts at exhibiting naked photos. Lucca sits second chair on the case, while Alicia tries out a new investigator, who botches her assignments as the opposition gains valuable information. As Lockhart, Agos & Lee also look for a new investigator to replace Kalinda, Cary attempts to address associate concerns regarding senior partner Howard Lyman, but ends up antagonizing him and causing difficulty within the firm. Alicia finally settles on Jason Crouse as her investigator, who spurns a better offer from Diane to work with Alicia instead. Meanwhile, Eli's appointment as Alicia's chief of staff is initially vetoed by Peter, but he concedes and allows him to work with her, much to Ruth's discontent. In a strategic move, Alicia tries to smooth things over with Democratic Party committee leader Frank Landau, who torpedoed her State's Attorney campaign.
| 137 | 3 | "Cooked" | Michael Zinberg | Luke Schelhaas | October 18, 2015 | 8.09 |
Alicia takes on a new case involving a defendant who synthesized a designer drug, an apparent analogue to gamma-Hydroxybutyric acid. The case entangles Alicia in an undercover FBI-led task force operation involving judicial bribery. Howard Lyman, fearing getting pushed out of Lockhart, Agos and Lee, approaches Alicia for legal advice for a possible ageism suit. While at her house, Howard meets Jackie and begins a relationship with her. Diane agrees with the partners to offload excess case work to Alicia in an attempt to prevent Alicia from becoming Canning's pawn. On the VP campaign, Ruth pushes Eli to convince Alicia and her mother, Veronica Loy, to appear on a cooking reality TV show. Not surprisingly, the encounter goes awry, much to Ruth's annoyance.
| 138 | 4 | "Taxed" | Jim McKay | Leonard Dick | October 25, 2015 | 8.82 |
Reese Dipple appoints his general counsel Ethan Carver to liaise with Lockhart, Agos and Lee and compels Diane to take over a case advocating against euthanasia. Ethan suggests to Cary that he speak to Alicia to lobby Peter to veto an imminent physician-assisted suicide bill. Eli happens to overhear the conversation between Alicia and Cary, and schemes behind the Florrick family's back in an attempt to annoy Ruth. Alicia comes across a case where an African-American woman is wrongly accused of stealing from a clothing store.
| 139 | 5 | "Payback" | Craig Zisk | Stephanie Sengupta | November 1, 2015 | 7.55 |
Eli gets desperate witnessing Peter's vice presidential campaign unfold without him at the helm. His daughter, Marissa, wanting him to move on, urges Alicia to fire him. Alicia and Lucca, agreeing to partner, take on the case of a student debtor trying to stave off harassment from a debt collection agency. Realizing the potential for a lucrative contingency fee, they convince their client to instead sue the private college where she incurred the debt, while Jason deals with the agency. Cary and Howard Lyman clash again, to the point Lyman demands a mediation, which Diane agrees to chair to stave off an ageism lawsuit.
| 140 | 6 | "Lies" | James Whitmore Jr. | Erica Shelton Kodish | November 8, 2015 | 8.27 |
Alicia and Lucca take on the case of a former company vice president fired for failing a polygraph lie detector test. Concerned about her investigator's previous career as an attorney and subsequent disbarment, Alicia decides to investigate Jason's history. Ruth believes Peter's upward trend in the polls might give him an actual chance to run for President, something which prompts her to reach out to Eli. Diane, Cary, and David decide to hire three new associates, and face a contentious decision when faced with the choice of hiring a young African-American lawyer. Eli, still scheming behind Ruth's back, discovers that Peter played a role in the hacking of election voting machines last year that brought down Alicia's State's Attorney campaign.
| 141 | 7 | "Driven" | David Dworetzky | Tyler Bensinger | November 15, 2015 | 8.52 |
Louis Canning refers to Alicia the case of a defendant accused of recklessly crashing a self-driving car into another vehicle. Alicia is pitted against both Canning and Diane as well as Cary Agos (from her old firm). Eli, worried about how Peter and Alicia's marriage is perceived to the media, tries to arrange for them to temporarily live together. Alicia makes good on her agreement to vote with Frank Landau after being appointed to the election board. Eli tries to arrange for Peter to meet with a wealthy CEO to donate to Peter's campaign with a fake birthday party for Grace. Meanwhile, Jackie becomes engaged to Howard Lyman, much to Peter's disapproval.
| 142 | 8 | "Restraint" | Matt Shakman | Adam R. Perlman | November 22, 2015 | 7.81 |
Ethan Carver asks Diane to argue a case that she strongly disagrees with politically. Involving pro-life and pro-choice advocates, the case's high profile displeases several clients of Lockhart, Agos and Lee. Alicia and Lucca debate ways to bring more business to their firm, and decide to poach clients from Louis Canning. Grace tries to help out in her own way and is able to land the firm new clients. Eli refers billionaire Courtney Paige to Alicia for legal advice after she decides to set a salary floor of $75,000 per year for all of her employees. Jason, while still investigating for Alicia and Lucca, begins working part-time as an investigator for Lockhart, Agos and Lee.
| 143 | 9 | "Discovery" | Rosemary Rodriguez | Joey Scavuzzo & Aaron Slavick | November 29, 2015 | 7.94 |
Alicia and Lucca agree to co-counsel alongside Louis Canning defending Chum-hum in a racially motivated tortious interference case against an African-American restaurant owner that went out of business, blaming the racial bias inherent in the Chum-hum's maps application. Both sides trudge through massive quantities of emails, photos and other documents during the discovery process attempting to find a breakthrough. Ruth become suspicious of the nature of Alicia and Jason's relationship, which invokes Eli's concern. Ruth and Eli both discover Jason personally investigated Alicia. Eli convenes a focus group to assess how far Alicia's rehabilitation is going in an attempt to convince her to run for a state senate seat.
| 144 | 10 | "KSR" | Jim McKay | Craig Turk | December 13, 2015 | 8.49 |
Lockhart, Agos and Lee are abandoned by their newly hired associates, right in the middle of a highly technical case representing Ethan Carver just before a filing deadline. Diane decides to hire the one associate they did not hire the first time while Cary tries to stop the associates from working for Louis Canning. Alicia and Lucca represent a respected surgeon accused of conspiring to kidnap, sedate, and rape the mother of one of his patients. Alicia loses her investigator after Ruth asks Eli's girlfriend, Paige, to hire him for two months out of town in an attempt to remove him from her life. The jury finds Alicia's client guilty, but the judge vacates the verdict as a matter of law, which Alicia suspects he did because Eli warned him about an impending bribery sting. Stung from breaking up with Paige, Eli confesses to Alicia that it was he who deleted a voicemail message she received from Will Gardner six years ago.
| 145 | 11 | "Iowa" | Matt Shakman | Erica Shelton Kodish | January 10, 2016 | 7.65 |
Alicia, Peter and the rest of her family ride through Iowa attempting to visit every single county for the caucus vote. Extremely angered by Eli's confession, Alicia ruminates on the possibilities of what might have been had she chosen to be with Will Gardner instead of Peter; she also ignores Eli and agrees with Ruth to spite him. Lucca represents Jackie Florrick in pre-nuptial negotiations with her fiancé Howard Lyman. Diane and Cary face a state discriminatory hiring investigation. David Lee squirreled away $2.2 million in Howard Lyman's name in an attempt to prevent Alicia from getting a better exit package when she was running for State's Attorney.
| 146 | 12 | "Tracks" | Félix Alcalá | Stephanie Sengupta | January 17, 2016 | 8.96 |
Alicia's neighbors become annoyed at her running her law firm from her apartment, and attempt to serve her an eviction notice which Grace tries to resolve by herself. With Peter's presidential campaign over, Eli returns to become Peter's Chief of Staff and before leaving, Ruth warns Eli regarding Peter's continuing viability as governor. Alicia and Cary team up to defend an old client against his former record label's assertion regarding ownership of a song he wrote. Cary offers Lucca and Alicia a chance to return to the firm. Marissa, after finding out about Eli's confession, urges Alicia to forgive Eli.
| 147 | 13 | "Judged" | Rosemary Rodriguez | Tyler Bensinger | January 31, 2016 | 8.03 |
Alicia decides to sue a sitting judge after a former bond client of hers reveals he has been in prison for eight months on a minor misdemeanor charge. Alicia and Lucca lose the case only to be subject to a malpractice suit by the same client. Cary Agos agrees to represent her and Lucca. Alicia still aches from the missed voice mail from Will, and tries to elicit more detail from Eli about it before forgiving him entirely. Freelance investigator Jason Crouse returns from California, and takes up work with both Diane and Alicia; helping Diane in arbitration attempting to prevent the defunding of a school newspaper, and in Alicia's malpractice suit. Cary offers Alicia another chance to rejoin Lockhart, Agos & Lee, but only as a junior partner.
| 148 | 14 | "Monday" | Nelson McCormick | Leonard Dick | February 14, 2016 | 7.96 |
Alicia returns to work at Lockhart, Agos & Lee, alongside Lucca but finds it difficult to adjust to worklife back at the firm when she and Lucca take on the case of the firm's own IT director who discovers a prototype device and is approached by media outlets to sell it. Eli's daughter, Marissa, is approached by an FBI agent who tries to elicit information about people in Alicia's life, including Ruth, who urges her to leave Peter. Eli deduces the FBI are after Peter.
| 149 | 15 | "Targets" | David Dworetzky | Luke Schelhaas | February 21, 2016 | 7.91 |
Alicia is appointed to join a panel of lawyers and attorneys for the Pentagon to reach a legal justification for the targeted killing of an American civilian who recruits for ISIS. After definitely gaining confirmation that the FBI is investigating Peter, Eli tries to hire Elsbeth Tascioni, but she recuses herself after realizing she may have a conflict of interest. Eli hires Elsbeth's ex-husband, Mike Tascioni, in an attempt to find out who that client might be. Jason Crouse is hired by David and Cary in an attempt to discern if Diane is trying to turn the firm into a female-only run firm. Alicia and Jason become lovers.
| 150 | 16 | "Hearing" | Félix Alcalá | Adam R. Perlman | March 6, 2016 | 7.27 |
Alicia and Jason spend the weekend together, only to be interrupted by her mother and brother. Veronica seeks Alicia's help after she was apparently scammed out of money. A grand jury is empaneled against Peter, headed by AUSA Connor Fox. Eli, with Alicia's help, is able to determine that the premise of the investigation is based on a prosecution Cary was involved with in 2012. David Lee and Cary ask Alicia if Diane has approached her about forming an all-female firm. Soon after, Diane approaches Alicia about pushing Cary out as named partner.
| 151 | 17 | "Shoot" | Frederick E.O. Toye | Stephanie Sengupta | March 20, 2016 | 8.08 |
Diane and Cary represent a client who is being accused of defamation after paying for a billboard ad that asserts a gun store ultimately is responsible for his daughter's death, due to the former's irresponsible business practices. Alicia is next to be deposed by the grand jury and with Eli's help is able to develop a strategy in an attempt to encourage the doubts of an incredulous grand juror. Alicia's daughter, Grace is accused of plagiarizing her college admissions essay. Alicia witnesses Jason meet and kiss another woman at a bar, and comes to a realization about the nature of their relationship.
| 152 | 18 | "Unmanned" | James Whitmore Jr. | Tyler Bensinger | March 27, 2016 | 7.51 |
Alicia and Diane argue a privacy case for billionaire Reese Dipple, representing a therapist who sues a security company over a drone due to concerns about privacy for himself and his patients and he shoots down the drone in the course of the trial. The opposition is represented by former Lockhart/Gardner associate Caitlyn D'Arcy. AUSA Connor Fox attempts to use Marissa to force Eli into testifying against Peter, prompting Eli to hire Diane as his attorney. Peter encounters Jason in Alicia's house for the first time, which prompts Alicia to ask Peter for a divorce. Peter, on the verge of being indicted, asks Alicia to hold off the divorce until after his trial. Against Cary's wishes, Diane and David vote to promote Alicia to the rank of named partner again, prompting Cary to resign and allow Diane to buy him out of the firm. Cary is subpoenaed to testify in Peter's upcoming trial.
| 153 | 19 | "Landing" | Phil Alden Robinson | Luke Schelhaas | April 17, 2016 | 8.55 |
Jeff Dellinger, a former NSA employee, changes his mind about entering the US from Canada at the last minute at the US preclearance area at the Toronto airport. This starts a tug of war between the US and Canada over jurisdiction, with Alicia and Lucca at Dillinger's side. Eventually, he seeks asylum, which Canada grants with suspicious haste, much to the dismay of the US representative. Meanwhile AUSA Fox arrests Peter at Alicia's apartment. Peter is offered a plea deal, which he rejects. Kurt wants to sell his business to be closer to Diane, and accepts an offer from his former star pupil, Holly Westfall. Kurt asks Diane to check the sale contract, from which Diane determines that Kurt's firm was undervalued. Kurt and confronts Holly.
| 154 | 20 | "Party" | Rosemary Rodriguez | Leonard Dick | April 24, 2016 | 8.49 |
Alicia hosts a party for Jackie's and Howard's Ketubah signing. Her brother Owen, her mother Veronica, Zack and Grace, Eli, his daughter Marissa, Peter, Diane and her husband Kurt all attend. Zack arrives with his girlfriend and announces his intent to marry her and move to France, something which both Peter and Alicia disapprove of. Peter loses his trial lawyer, Mike Tascioni, because Mike's dog Tom, an emotional support animal, is sick. Eli hires Jason to find incriminating evidence against Peter. Diane proposes to Alicia she becomes one of two named partners alongside herself, renaming the firm to Lockhart, Florrick & Associates. Cary hires Louis Canning to represent him during Peter's trial. Jackie discovers that Alicia is divorcing Peter.
| 155 | 21 | "Verdict" | Michael Zinberg | Craig Turk | May 1, 2016 | 9.19 |
Peter's trial begins with Diane defending him in court. Alicia and Eli try their hardest to keep Peter out of jail. The firm's conference room wall is accidentally destroyed when tradesmen mistake Lockhart, Florrick & Associates for another law firm, which forces the firm to evacuate to a lower floor. Diane tries to lure more female lawyers in an attempt to expand the firm, but faces opposition from David Lee who threatens a sex discrimination suit. Alicia hires Jason to investigate for Peter's trial, which puts him in an awkward position. Jason confides to Lucca his fear that if Peter is convicted, Alicia will not divorce him but will stand by him because it is in her character to be self-sacrificing. Diane asks her husband, Kurt to testify for her in Peter's trial which pits him against one of his own former star pupil, Holly Westfall, who embarrasses him by claiming that Kurt oversells his findings to the benefit of his clients. Alicia, through Louis Canning tries to keep Cary on the same side. Geneva Pine is a surprise witness against Peter. Canning gives Alicia evidence that Pine is lying in revenge for his ending their affair but Peter denies the affair and orders his lawyers not to use Canning's evidence. AUSA Connor Fox offers a plea bargain of two years in jail, which Peter decides to accept however before he can communicate his decision to Fox, Alicia and Peter are notified that the jury has returned from deliberations.
| 156 | 22 | "End" | Robert King | Robert King & Michelle King | May 8, 2016 | 10.62 |
The jury rises from deliberations, but not with a verdict: they want to hear the actual audio of a transcript that was provided in Peter's trial. Peter's defense scrambles to find a legal precedent to re-open trial proceedings to allow the jury to hear testimony related to the audio. Alicia, reminiscing on her time with her former lover, Will Gardner, is able to locate one. Cary, who is now a lecturer, is approached by Alicia and Jason to help out with Peter's trial, and is able to find a lead on the missing bullets from the original case Peter oversaw as State's Attorney. However the strategy backfires when ballistics tests reveal the bullets were fired from Locke's gun, suggesting his guilt and helping to prove the prosecution's case. While they are able to prevent the jury from seeing the ballistics tests, Diane and Alicia clash when Kurt McVeigh agrees to testify for the prosecution and they disagree as to whether they should undercut him in cross examination. Lucca cross examines Kurt anyway and imputes he had an affair with Holly Westfall, angering Diane. Eli, realizing the imminent end to Peter's political career, tries to maneuver his political backers into one day supporting Alicia. Aware of his own demise as Governor, and before the jury can return a proper verdict, Peter agrees to a one-year probation plea deal with AUSA Fox. Lucca encourages Alicia to talk to Jason. She finally agrees but Jason is nowhere to be found. She phones Jason to tell him the trial is over and talk to him about their future but gets his voicemail. Alicia agrees to stand by Peter's side as he resigns from office but sees Jason's profile in the wings and leaves Peter to chase after Jason but does not find him. Diane walks up to Alicia, slaps her, and walks away.

== Reception ==
The seventh season of The Good Wife received positive reviews. The review aggregator website Rotten Tomatoes reports a 91% rating based on 21 reviews. The website's consensus reads, "Reinvigorated storylines and an even stronger cast keep The Good Wife fresh in its seventh season - and away from the doldrums that overcome many long-running dramas."

However, like the latter part of season six where viewer ratings fell precipitously, the seventh season has received criticism for the "incredibly uneven [plotting], sucking so much of the vitality and urgency out of the show". Variety noted that in season seven that "there were notably more of subplots and segues that were, at best, time-fillers and at worst, eyeroll-inducing" and said it "was obvious that it was time for the show to go". TV.com observed that "obituaries for the show were already burying it instead of praising it, pointing to where it all went wrong, or that it wasn't even truly that great to begin with. An episode like "End" solidified a lot of those arguments. Hell, it solidified a lot of my arguments about this season being a grab bag of ideas." Similar to how Kalinda Sharma was sidelined in season six, which led to her departure, season seven main characters like Cary Agos and Diane Lockhart lacked compelling storylines to the point where they almost became irrelevant. With the departure of male lead Josh Charles (who played Will Gardner) in season five, the show's "writers really struggled to rebuild that same type of long-term emotional storytelling. His departure left a gap that was never fully filled again".

The final episode of The Good Wife: "End" had a divided reaction among viewers and critics, with many praising a fitting ending to a complex character with others who argued of its ambiguity and absence of a conclusion - particularly with Alicia's love life. The finale drew controversy in its last scene when Diane Lockhart slaps Alicia Florrick after betraying her in court to save Peter from jail. Alicia is then left alone in a hallway before walking away to a future of uncertainty regarding her relationship with Jason, her career and political life. Vanity Fair noting "As Breaking Bad famously tracked the evolution of Walter White "from Mr. Chips to Scarface," The Good Wife followed Alicia as she evolved into Peter. The Kings claim the show was "moving in the direction where there wasn't much difference between who Alicia was and who her husband was. Is Alicia a villain or an anti-hero? It's hard to quite see her that way after all the good she's done for so many seasons. But the inclusion of Will Gardner in the finale momentarily humanizes Alicia while also highlighting the idea that Alicia's transformation into Peter has been a longtime coming", and claiming that "The show's incredible finale belongs to an earlier age of television". Emily Nussbaum of The New Yorker said "it was an ending that commanded respect". The episode received a huge backlash on social media and has been rated one of the lowest of the series on IMDB. In anticipation of a divided audience, Robert and Michelle King penned a letter to the fans explaining their creative decisions.
