= Hitting the Fan =

- The Good Wife episode
- Episode no.: Season 5 Episode 5
- Directed by: James Whitmore Jr.
- Written by: Robert King; Michelle King
- Original air date: October 27, 2013

Guest appearances
- Erin Dilly as Joely Angler; Robbie Sublett as John Gaultner; Kenneth Tigar as Judge James Chase; Dan Ziskie as Steve Koesterich

Episode chronology
← Previous "Outside the Bubble"	Next → "The Next Day"
- The Good Wife (season 5)

"Hitting the Fan" is the fifth episode of the fifth season of the American legal drama television series The Good Wife, and the 95th episode overall. It originally aired on CBS in the United States on October 27, 2013. The episode deals with Alicia and Cary forming their own firm and the conflicts this causes.

The episode was written by Robert King and Michelle King, and directed by James Whitmore Jr.

== Plot ==
In the prior episode, Diane uncovered Alicia and Cary's plan to leave and start their own law firm. In the opening scene of Hitting the Fan, Diane reveals it to Will, and he angrily confronts Alicia about the situation. Hence, Alicia is removed as partner and then fired along with all fourth year associates and a frantic pursuit of clients begins. Lockhart/Gardner imposes a restraining order on the new firm, preventing them from lobbying their biggest client, Chumhum. Florrick/Agos responds in kind as the two firms battle each other in and out of court, while relationships crumble. Meanwhile, Peter, after hearing of his wife's firing, helps Alicia secure a client and rescinds Diane's Illinois Supreme Court Justice nomination.

== Reception ==
Hitting the Fan received acclaim from critics, with some ranking it among the show's best episodes, but with a few noting it works best for those who had closely followed the show.

Chris Harnick of The Huffington Post called it a "riveting hour of TV that I wished could have lasted forever." James Poniewozik of Time stated, "You title an episode “Hitting the Fan,” and you had best bring it. Last night’s "The Good Wife"–in which Lockhart Gardner discovered Alicia and Cary’s plans to bolt the firm–brought it." Alan Sepinwall on HitFix said that, "Earlier this week, I wrote about how terrific this season of "The Good Wife" has been, and tonight's episode was a cut above even what's come before. On The A.V. Club it won the Golden TV Dinner in their Tournament of Episodes by beating the "Cooperative Polygraphy" episode of Community. In the discussion Myles McNutt praised it for "pulling every piece of the show into the fray and never looking back" while Scott Von Doviak voted for "Cooperative Polygraphy" instead as he felt "Hitting the Fan" might be best for longtime viewers. Zack Handlen also indicated "Hitting the Fan" might be less rewarding to newcomers. The episode was nominated for a Writers Guild of America Award for Episodic Drama, but lost to the Breaking Bad episode "Confessions".
