= The Good Wife season 1 =

The Good Wife
- Season 1
- Season 1 U.S. DVD cover
- Starring: Julianna Margulies; Matt Czuchry; Archie Panjabi; Graham Phillips; Makenzie Vega; Josh Charles; Christine Baranski
- No. of episodes: 23

Release
- Original network: CBS
- Original release: September 22, 2009 – May 25, 2010

Season chronology
- Next → Season 2

The first season of The Good Wife began airing on September 22, 2009 and finished on May 25, 2010. It consisted of 23 episodes.

== Premise ==
The series focuses on Alicia Florrick (Margulies), whose husband Peter (Noth), the former Cook County, Illinois State's Attorney, has been jailed following a notorious political corruption and sex scandal. After having spent the previous thirteen years as a stay-at-home mother, Alicia returns to the workforce as a litigator to provide for her two children.

== Cast ==
=== Main ===
- Julianna Margulies as Alicia Florrick
- Matt Czuchry as Cary Agos
- Archie Panjabi as Kalinda Sharma
- Graham Phillips as Zach Florrick
- Makenzie Vega as Grace Florrick
- Josh Charles as Will Gardner
- Christine Baranski as Diane Lockhart

=== Recurring ===
- Chris Noth as Peter Florrick
- Mary Beth Peil as Jackie Florrick
- Titus Welliver as Glenn Childs
- Joe Morton as Daniel Golden
- Martha Plimpton as Patti Nyholm
- Jill Flint as Lana Delaney
- Emily Bergl as Bree
- David Paymer as Judge Richard Cuesta
- Alan Cumming as Eli Gold
- Michael Boatman as Julius Cain
- Dylan Baker as Colin Sweeney
- Sonequa Martin-Green as Courtney Wells
- Renée Elise Goldsberry as Geneva Pine
- Dreama Walker as Becca
- Gary Cole as Kurt McVeigh
- Kevin Conway as Jonas Stern
- Carrie Preston as Elsbeth Tascioni
- Zach Grenier as David Lee

=== Guest ===
- Mamie Gummer as Nancy Crozier
- Ana Gasteyer as Patrice Lessner
- Mike Colter as Lemond Bishop
- Felix Solis as Kevin Rodriguez
- Nitya Vidyasagar as Frida Verma

== Episodes ==
No. overall	No. in season	Title	Directed by	Written by	Original release date	US viewers (millions)
1	1	"Pilot"	Charles McDougall	Robert King & Michelle King	September 22, 2009	13.71
After having to return to work following her husband Peter Florrick's corruption scandal and incarceration, Alicia Florrick is assigned her first case at the firm of Stern, Lockhart and Gardner – a straightforward retrial of a woman accused of murdering her ex-husband. Since her firm successfully deadlocked the first jury, sticking to the same strategy should work again, but Alicia soon discovers that she has a real fight on her hands.
2	2	"Stripped"	Charles McDougall	Robert King & Michelle King	September 29, 2009	13.69
Alicia and Will Gardner represent a stripper who was raped at a bachelor party by the groom, a young man from a wealthy Chicago family. On the personal front, Alicia confronts Peter over his indiscretions, and she debates whether or not the children should visit him in prison. The Florricks' kids Zach and Grace find doctored photos of Peter's indiscretions sent anonymously for Alicia, but they hide them from their mother.
3	3	"Home"	Scott Ellis	Dee Johnson	October 6, 2009	13.69
Alicia returns to her old upscale neighborhood to defend a former friend's teen son, who is accused of murdering a security guard at a friend's house. The 18-year-old man admits he was at the home but claims he's innocent of the crime. Cary Agos is assigned to help Alicia with the case, even though he has never tried one in court.
4	4	"Fixed"	Daniel Minahan	Todd Ellis Kessler	October 13, 2009	12.98
Alicia discovers evidence that a juror may have been bribed with $35,000 in a class-action lawsuit against a major pharmaceutical company. Alicia's client was paralyzed after taking one of the company's drugs. Meanwhile, Peter's lawyer tries to get Alicia to help in her husband's defense and attempts to bribe her with gifts.
5	5	"Crash"	Gloria Muzio	Ted Humphrey	October 20, 2009	13.26
Alicia and Will represent three widows of train engineers who have been accused by the company that they, not the company, were responsible for their deaths in a train crash. Alicia and Will have 72 hours to find the smoking gun to prove that the company was responsible. On the home front, Alicia and her mother-in-law Jackie clash when Jackie goes against Alicia's wishes and takes the children to visit Peter in jail for his birthday.
6	6	"Conjugal"	Rod Holcomb	Angela Amato Velez	November 3, 2009	12.74
Alicia and Will work on the appeal of a death row inmate accused of killing a police officer. Knowing that her client was convicted of the crime under Peter's regime as state's attorney, Alicia agrees to his request of a conjugal visit in order to obtain any information Peter may have regarding the original case.
7	7	"Unorthodox"	John Polson	Robert King & Michelle King	November 10, 2009	13.35
Alicia serves as co-counsel to a handsome storefront lawyer (Chris Bowers) who is defending an Orthodox Jewish couple being sued in a slip-and-fall case. Alicia is assigned because one of the defendants is the daughter of one of the law firm's named partners. The victim claims she was badly injured when she tripped on a wire outside of the couple's house, but Alicia believes the incident may be a scam. Meanwhile, Will and Diane Lockhart make a round of layoffs at the firm.
8	8	"Unprepared"	Jim McKay	Corinne Brinkerhoff	November 17, 2009	12.70
Alicia defends a scientist accused of arson after the lab in which the woman works is torched. It's soon learned that the lab is the target of a hate group. Meanwhile, Alicia is asked to testify on her husband's behalf at his bail hearing, but she is uncertain if she wants him to return home. Zach becomes determined to uncover the identity of the person who is leaving damaging photos and DVDs at the Florricks' front door.
9	9	"Threesome"	James Whitmore Jr.	Ted Humphrey	November 24, 2009	12.53
Alicia represents the firm's senior partner after he is arrested for DUI and assaulting a police officer, and she must deal with the murky office politics that come with the case. Meanwhile, Chelsea Handler interviews Peter's mistress, who is promoting a tell-all book about her affair with Peter.
10	10	"Lifeguard"	Paris Barclay	Tom Smuts	December 15, 2009	14.17
Alicia investigates a judge's questionable motives after he overturns a simple plea bargain she arranged and sentences her juvenile client to nine months in detention. Her investigation reveals the judge has a history of unusual sentences and may be a racist. Meanwhile, Diane is offered a judgeship and considers leaving the firm.
11	11	"Infamy"	Nelson McCormick	Todd Ellis Kessler	January 5, 2010	13.98
A Tucker Carlson–type TV commentator continually accuses a Chicago mother of killing her missing 3-year-old child, causing her to commit suicide. The firm represents the grieving husband in a wrongful death suit against the TV commentator and his television network. Alicia represents the wife of her husband's nemesis, Glenn Childs, in a divorce case.
12	12	"Painkiller"	Steve Shill	Corinne Brinkerhoff	January 12, 2010	13.87
A star high-school quarterback dies from an overdose of painkillers, and Alicia defends the family physician who is charged with murder for prescribing the medication. The doctor claims he is innocent, and Alicia attempts to uncover the truth. Meanwhile, Jackie suffers a stroke, and Childs asks investigator Kalinda Sharma to help undermine Peter's appeal.
13	13	"Bad"	Alex Zakrzewski	Ted Humphrey	February 2, 2010	12.72
Alicia defends in civil court Colin Sweeney, a wealthy man who is accused of murdering his wife. Part of his wife's body is found near where the man lives, which makes him look guilty. The rest of her body is later found on their daughter's property, which raises the possibility that she killed the wife. The man was found not guilty in his criminal trial but Alicia suspects he may have committed the crime. Meanwhile, Peter's appeal begins, and Diane buys a gun for protection when a drug dealer she unsuccessfully defended years ago threatens to kill her.
14	14	"Hi"	John Gallagher	Robert King & Michelle King & Barry Schkolnick	February 9, 2010	14.75
Sonya Rucker, whose company is a client of Alicia's firm, has a crisis. Her babysitter, Lisa Pruit, was murdered at Rucker's home, and her husband, Jason Rucker, is the lead suspect. Will and Diane call in Alicia and Cary to help with the case. Cary had thought he had the following day off and has taken mushrooms with a friend in from Seattle; he must pull himself together for the next 48 hours. At the crime scene, Kalinda notices a small item that appears to be a rubber nub from the bottom of a laptop. When contact is finally made with Jason, who claims to have been in a movie, they bring him into the firm and have him take a polygraph test before the police arrive to arrest him. As Will, Alicia and a tripping Cary question Jason, they discover that he was at his studio where he has been working on a graphic novel. Lisa was working with Jason on a graphic novel at his studio, but their relationship did not go any further than that. At first, Kalinda suspects the neighborhood security guard is responsible for the murder, but turns her attention towards one of Lisa's classmates, Max, when she discovers a rubber nub is missing from the bottom of his laptop. Max may have gotten Lisa pregnant, but when she wouldn't have an abortion, he killed her and tried to frame Jason. Kalinda is subpoenaed to testify at Peter's appeal trial where she describes working for both Peter and Childs. Peter wins his appeal and is released to home arrest with electronic monitoring.
15	15	"Bang"	Rod Holcomb	Courtney Kemp Agboh	March 2, 2010	13.29
Peter returns home under house arrest with ankle monitor while his appeal is considered. He hires political operative Eli Gold to assist in the appeal. Alicia serves as second chair for Diane in a murder trial. Their client, Brad Broussard, is charged with shooting Miles Wagner, an unpopular mutual fund manager who defrauded people out of their life savings by assisting in Bernard Madoff's investment scandal. Diane consults ballistics expert Kurt McVeigh. Alicia discovers a conspiracy tactic that will allow a key witness to testify, and Broussard is vindicated and set free. FBI agent Lana Delaney asks Kalinda to feed her information about Peter, but Kalinda declines.
16	16	"Fleas"	Rosemary Rodriguez	Amanda Segel	March 9, 2010	13.91
Alicia and Will defend an attorney who's arrested for murder because he allegedly leaked a witness list to his client, a drug lord, which resulted in the murder of the star witness. Now under house arrest, Peter strategizes about how to handle his retrial the next steps in his public rehabilitation.
17	17	"Heart"	Félix Alcalá	Corinne Brinkerhoff	March 16, 2010	13.41
An emergency courtroom is set up in a hospital conference room. Will represents Kate Willoughby, whose unborn child requires an in-utero surgical intervention on its heart. Lifestate, Kate's insurance provider, has blocked the surgery two days before it's scheduled because they don't cover experimental procedures. Alicia's firm is bringing a class-action lawsuit against Lifestate, and the Willoughby case would set a precedent for the 68 other cases in which Lifestate denied coverage. Lifestate's lawyer offers Will a deal -- drop the class action suit and they'll find the money to save the baby -- but Will refuses. When it looks like the case's outcome will be in favor of Kate, Lifestate's defense claims that Kate's husband inaccurately filled out their application for coverage and thus the contract for insurance is void. With Kalinda's help, Will gets leverage on Lifestate's unethical practices. Rather than having the information become public, a settlement is reached, and the baby's surgery is a success. On the personal front, Peter continues to repair his reputation through religion; while at the office, Alicia and Will share a kiss, which leads to Alicia sleeping with Peter.
18	18	"Doubt"	Félix Alcalá	Robert King & Michelle King & Barry Schkolnick	April 6, 2010	12.06
Alicia and Will defend a college student accused of killing her roommate while under the influence of a sleep aid. As they defend their client, Will and Alicia must deal with the tension that has existed between them since the night of their kiss. Meanwhile, Diane continues her flirtatious relationship with conservative ballistics expert Kurt McVeigh.
19	19	"Boom"	Lesli Linka Glatter	Ted Humphrey	April 27, 2010	12.07
Jeffrey Sanborn's widow, Karen Sanborn, is seeking punitive damages for her husband's death which her new attorney, Jonas Stern, claims was the intentional act of Stern, Lockhart, and Gardner's client, Charles Clay, owner and editor of The Cook County Vindicator. A Muslim extremist group claimed responsibility for the pipe bomb explosion at the newspaper's office after Charles published a controversial political cartoon that showed Muhammad being humiliated. Sanborn, the paper's managing editor, was killed in the blast. As Jonas and his team try to convince the jury that Clay published the cartoon to sell more newspapers, the firm looks closer at the crime scene and realizes that the bombing was an inside job. Also, Alicia plays on Jonas's dementia, throwing him off during the trial while Cary foils Jonas's attempt at poaching a number of the firm's associates. On the personal front, Peter and the family attend a church service, but he uses this opportunity to meet secretly with Gerald Kozko about the latter's potentially damning testimony. Alicia is furious at Peter for making her believe he had found religion and was trying to be a better man. She leaves the Florrick apartment, and the episode ends with Peter going after her, setting off electronic monitoring alarm.
20	20	"Mock"	Rod Holcomb	Todd Ellis Kessler	May 4, 2010	12.88
When Peter crosses the threshold, the electronic monitoring alarm begins to sound followed shortly by the phone ringing. When the police arrive, Peter is back in the apartment and Zach blames a skateboarding trick gone wrong for breaking the monitor's sensor. Will participates in a mock trial as a judge. Alicia's building manager is arrested as an undocumented immigrant and is in danger of being deported, because of her son's apparent involvement in a person-smuggling operation.
21	21	"Unplugged"	Christopher Misiano	Karen Hall	May 11, 2010	12.85
The firm's divorce lawyer David Lee is representing Caroline Wilder, the soon-to-be ex-wife of rock star Max Wilder. Just before the court date, Max Wilder ends up in a coma, with the soon-to-be ex-wife and the soon-to-be new wife fighting for control of his estate. Eli Gold comes to Alicia to discuss Peter's re-election. Alicia goes to Eli for a favor. In the meantime, the contest between Alicia and Cary is decided.
22	22	"Hybristophilia"	Frederick E. O. Toye	Frank Pierson	May 18, 2010	12.17
Alicia is celebrating her victory with Kalinda when she gets a request from Will to get the firm's client and accused wife killer Colin Sweeney to sign off on the new language in his company's merger. When she arrives, she finds that he is handcuffed to a dead woman. Sweeney claims she attacked him and killed his dog.
23	23	"Running"	James Whitmore Jr.	Robert King & Michelle King & Corinne Brinkerhoff	May 25, 2010	10.58
Alicia and Diane facilitate an immunity deal for an undercover cop who will testify in front of a grand jury that his fellow officers, Task Force members, have been conspiring with gang members to deal in illegal firearms. Two hours later, the cop is dead. The cop's widow files a multi-million dollar wrongful death suit against Cook County and the City of Chicago, and Alicia is her lawyer. Kalinda finds the cache of illegal weapons, but the Task Force officers maintain their innocence in the death of their comrade. Further investigation reveals that the cop's widow was the one who tipped off the gang member of her husband's true identity. Unaware of the widow's involvement, Cook County offer a $500,000 settlement. Alicia agrees to support Peter in his renewed campaign for state's attorney, provided that the kids are not involved and she can continue working.

== Reception ==
The first season of The Good Wife received positive reviews from critics. The review aggregator website Rotten Tomatoes reports an 83% rating based on 27 reviews. The website's consensus reads, "Along with Julianna Margulies and a fine cast, the gripping drama The Good Wife, boasts hook-heavy plotlines torn from the headlines." On Metacritic, the first season of the show currently sits at a 75 out of 100, based on 26 reviews, indicating generally favorable reviews.

== Awards and nominations ==
Primetime Emmy Awards

- Nominated for Outstanding Drama Series
- Nominated for Outstanding Lead Actress in a Drama Series (Julianna Margulies) (for the episode "Threesome")
- Nominated for Outstanding Supporting Actress in a Drama Series (Christine Baranski) (for the episode "Bang")
- Won for Outstanding Supporting Actress in a Drama Series (Archie Panjabi) (for the episode "Hi")
- Nominated for Outstanding Guest Actor in a Drama Series (Dylan Baker) (for the episode "Bad")
- Nominated for Outstanding Guest Actor in a Drama Series (Alan Cumming) (for the episode "Fleas")
- Nominated for Outstanding Writing for a Drama Series (Michelle King & Robert King for "Pilot")
- Nomination for Outstanding Casting for a Drama Series (Mark Saks)

== Ratings ==
Episode	Title	Air Date	HH Rating	18-49 Rating	Viewers/Live+7	Rank	Ref
1	Pilot	September 22, 2009	9.2	3.1	13.714/15.39	#15	
2	Stripped	September 29, 2009	9.1	3.1	13.690/15.31	#14	
3	Home	October 6, 2009	8.9	2.9	13.693/15.21	#11	
4	Fixed	October 13, 2009	8.7	2.7	12.798/14.55	#17	
5	Crash	October 20, 2009	8.8	2.8	13.258/14.74	#14	
6	Conjugal	November 3, 2009	8.6	2.7	12.743	#16	
7	Unorthodox	November 10, 2009	8.8	2.8	13.352	#15	
8	Unprepared	November 17, 2009	8.4	2.6	12.699/14.45	-	
9	Threesome	November 24, 2009	8.1	2.8	12.529	#15	
10	Lifeguard	December 1, 2009	9.1	2.8	14.170	#10	
11	Infamy	January 5, 2010	9.0	3.0	13.975	#10	
12	Painkiller	January 12, 2010	9.0	3.0	13.871	#15	
13	Bad	February 2, 2010	8.4	2.6	12.808/14.62	#16	
14	Hi	February 9, 2010	9.6	3.1	14.754/16.72	#12	
15	Bang	March 2, 2010	8.5	2.7	13.319/15.45	#15	
16	Fleas	March 9, 2010	9.0	2.9	13.950	#10	
17	Heart	March 16, 2010	8.6	2.7	13.399	#6	
18	Doubt	April 6, 2010	7.9	2.3	12.061/14.21	-	
19	Boom	April 27, 2010	8.0	2.2	12.074	#13	
20	Mock	May 4, 2010	8.4	2.4	12.881	#9	
21	Unplugged	May 11, 2010	8.3	2.4	12.851	#13	
22	Hybristophilia	May 18, 2010	7.9	2.3	12.038	#14	
23	Running	May 25, 2010	7.0	2.0	10.603	#13	
