= The Last Call (The Good Wife) =

- The Good Wife episode
- Episode no.: Season 5 Episode 16
- Directed by: Jim McKay
- Written by: Robert King; Michelle King
- Original air date: March 30, 2014

Guest appearances
- Becky Ann Baker as Alma Hoff; Vincent Curatola as Judge Thomas Politi; Matthew Goode as Finn Polmar; James McDaniel as Detective Lou Johnson; Hunter Parrish as Jeffrey Grant; Jordana Spiro as Detective Jenna Villette

Episode chronology
← Previous "Dramatics, Your Honor"	Next → "A Material World"
- The Good Wife (season 5)

"The Last Call" is the sixteenth episode of the fifth season of the American legal drama television series The Good Wife, and the 106th episode overall. It originally aired on CBS in the United States on March 30, 2014. The episode deals with the aftermath of Will Gardner being killed in the previous episode. It also concerns his former client and killer, Jeffrey Grant, and what motivated his behavior.

The episode was written by Robert King and Michelle King, and directed by Jim McKay. It marked the second in a string of guest appearances by Matthew Goode as Finn Polmar, a character who went on to have a flirtatious friendship with Alicia.

== Plot ==
The episode concerns events in the wake of Will's death; Alicia grieves over him, distancing herself from her husband Peter in the process. She finds a voicemail that Will left her; due to an interruption, though, it said nothing substantial. Trying to determine what Will wanted to say, Alicia interviews the presiding judge who witnessed the shooting, and talks to ASA Finn Polmar, who was also shot, and Polmar's assistant. Ultimately, she arrives at a dead end, and is left to guess. Kalinda tries to understand why Will's client, Jeffrey Grant, went on a shooting spree. Diane breaks the news of Will's death to the partners at her firm, while David Lee tries to keep Will's top clients from leaving. Forced to do a deposition without Alicia, Cary takes out his anger on opposing counsel.

== Reception ==
The Last Call was met with critical acclaim from critics. Breia Brissey of Entertainment Weekly said it "managed to deliver a heartfelt, appropriate, and even funny-at-times episode". Sonia Saraiya of The A.V. Club gave it an A− saying "So while 'The Last Call' is an incredibly sad hour, it's also a triumphant one—and at times, even funny." The episode received a Writers Guild of America Award for Episodic Drama.
