= Will Gardner =

Fictional character from the television series The Good Wife

- The Good Wife character
- First appearance: "Pilot"; September 22, 2009
- Last appearance: "End"; May 8, 2016
- Created by: Robert and Michelle King
- Portrayed by: Josh Charles

In-universe information
- Gender: Male
- Occupation: Attorney at law
- Relatives: Sarah Gardner (sister); Audrey Gardner (sister)

William Gardner is a fictional character of CBS television series The Good Wife and was portrayed by Josh Charles for the first five seasons of the show's run. For his performance, Charles received two Primetime Emmy Award nominations as well as a Golden Globe nomination.

== Background ==
An old friend of Alicia's, in the pilot he helped her get a job with the firm and is constantly trying to avoid appearing as if he favours her. This is complicated by the fact that the two have feelings for each other. Will and Alicia have an affair beginning at the end of season two. In season three they break up when Alicia's daughter goes missing, and Alicia decides she needs to focus more on her children. He is seen as very much of a ladies' man throughout the series and had various love affairs and girlfriends. Will generally had a good working relationship with Diane Lockhart, as co-managing partner at the firm, and the two demonstrate a shrewd ability to guide their business, even through difficult times. Will plays in a regular pick-up basketball game with other attorneys and judges, and has friendships with the players that are eventually scrutinised. During season three, Will is suspended from practicing law for six months as punishment stemming from money he stole and replaced from a client 15 years previously along with an unfounded bribery charge involving the judges he plays basketball with. He returns to the firm after the suspension expires in season four. In season five after much planning, Alicia and Cary leave Lockhart & Gardner to start their own firm; Will takes this betrayal personally. In episode 15 of the fifth season, he is shot and killed in the courtroom by his client Jeffrey Grant (played by Hunter Parrish).

Following his death, he appeared in fantasy sequences in episodes "Minds Eye" and the series finale, "End".
