= Kalinda Sharma =

- The Good Wife character
- First appearance: "Pilot"; September 22, 2009
- Last appearance: "Wanna Partner?"; May 10, 2015
- Created by: Robert and Michelle King
- Portrayed by: Archie Panjabi

In-universe information
- Alias: Leela Tahiri
- Gender: Female
- Occupation: Investigator
- Spouse: Nick Savarese
- Significant others: Cary Agos; Lana Delaney

Kalinda Sharma (born c.1984) is a fictional character on the CBS television series The Good Wife, portrayed by Archie Panjabi for the first six seasons of the show's run. For her performance, Panjabi received three Primetime Emmy Award nominations, winning in 2010, and received one Golden Globe nomination.

== Background ==
Little is known of Kalinda's background. She worked for State's Attorney Peter Florrick (Chris Noth) for three years prior to the beginning of the show and he fired her after accusing her of working two jobs. She's first introduced as an investigator working at Stern, Lockhart & Gardner, and she becomes fast friends with Alicia Florrick. Kalinda is trusted implicitly by the firm and frequently takes personally-billed by both Will Gardner and Dianne Lockhart.

Eventually however, Peter's wife Alicia finds out Kalinda had had a one-night stand with Peter before she met her, damaging their friendship, but the two eventually reconcile. In season four, it is also revealed that Kalinda has an estranged abusive husband, Nick Saverese (played by Marc Warren). Nick attempts to reenter Kalinda’s life by becoming a client of Lockhart and Gardner. While the two briefly reconcile and become intimate again, Nick continues to be controlling and physically abusive. Eventually Kalinda tells him to leave and his fate is left ambiguous.

Kalinda also grows romantically close with Cary Agos (Matt Czuchry), though she continues to carry on relationships with women (to include an FBI agent investigating Lemond Bishop). Kalinda is also revealed to have had a physical relationship with a paralegal working at the firm when this paralegal attempts to sue them for sexual harassment. Kalinda maintains a close friendship with Will Gardner and cries when he is killed in the courthouse. She later confronts his killer in his jail cell, telling him that he now has to live forever with what he has done.

In season six, she desperately tries to save Cary from malicious prosecution on drug related charges while Alicia is busy running for office. After desperately trying to force Lemond Bishop to provide Cary a way out of the situation by testifying, she eventually becomes indebted to him and begins working for him. Kalinda begins driving his son to and from school, as Mr Bishop states that his son’s school doesn’t want him to be picked up by someone that looks like a bodyguard. Kalinda protects the child when he is being physically bullied by one of his schoolmates but agrees not to tell his father, fearing that he will kill the bully.

At a point of desperation, she fakes a Brady violation by the Chicago Police Department in order to have Cary's charges dropped. Later when she's found out, she's forced to surrender drug dealer Lemond Bishop (Mike Colter) to the state's attorney's office in order to prevent Diane Lockhart (Christine Baranski) from being prosecuted. One of Bishop’s Lieutenants discovers her reporting and tells Bishop. In fear for her safety after turning state's evidence on Lemond Bishop, Kalinda disappears. She briefly returns after Lemond Bishop’s lawyer begins threatening Alicia and Cary in Season 6 episode 22, revealing that she left a confession that would exonerate Alicia, Cary, and Diane if they ever needed it. Alicia asks if she will ever see Kalinda again and Kalinda says that she does not think so. When Lemond Bishop’s lawyers begin threatening returns to Alicia’s apartment she burns the letter.

== Personality ==
Kalinda is unflappable, inscrutable, fiercely private, and occasionally physically violent. She is exceptionally good at her job, although her tactics are not always strictly legal. She is often the key to the firm's winning a case, usually at the 11th hour. She usually does not work well with others. Although Kalinda doesn't let many people close to her, she becomes good friends with Alicia, with the aid of tequila shots; and she feels protective of Alicia. Kalinda has a cynical, misanthropic outlook on human behavior. She is bisexual and has a series of relationships through the show, mostly with women and often because they can help her with a case. Kalinda once claimed that she prefers women because as far as she's concerned, women are better lovers than men because women understand her needs and feelings better. Very little is known about Kalinda when the series begins, and she is incredibly secretive about her past.

== Style ==
Kalinda's fashion plays a huge role in her character. As an employee in a prestigious law firm, her outfit contrasts with the lawyers' as it is much more provocative and edgy. The character's signature wardrobe piece has become a pair of knee-high boots; the character initially wore pumps but Panjabi felt that boots "grounded her in the character." The character is also noted for wearing a lot of leather jackets often seen in Burberry, Elie Tahari, Dolce & Gabbana and Prada. According to the costume designer, the character has around 60 leather jackets.
