= Ted Humphrey =

American screenwriter and producer

- Education: Georgetown University, University of Virginia School of Law
- Occupation(s): Showrunner, Screenwriter
- Known for: The Good Wife, The Lincoln Lawyer

Ted Humphrey is an American television and film writer, producer and director. He is best known for his work on the CBS series The Good Wife, and for being the co-creator and showrunner of the Netflix series The Lincoln Lawyer. The Good Wife was nominated for a Writers Guild of America Award for Best New Series in 2010, as well as the 2010 and 2011 Emmy Award for Best Drama Series. In 2011, he was nominated for a Writers Guild of America Award for Best Episodic Drama Writing for his script for the episode "Boom," and was honored with the Voices of Courage and Conscience Award from the Muslim Public Affairs Council for the same script. The Good Wife also earned a Peabody Award and twice received the American Film Institute’s Award for Excellence in Film and Television.

== Career ==
After graduating from Georgetown University and the University of Virginia School of Law, Humphrey began his career as a screenwriter, writing screenplays for various studios. His work as a television writer began with the science fiction/action comedy series Now and Again in 1999. Early in his career, he wrote for several series, including the short-lived horror anthology Night Visions and the medical drama Dr. Vegas. He also wrote the teleplay and co-wrote the story for the television movie thriller The Triangle in 2001.

In 2006 Humphrey joined the staff of the drama series The Nine, and in 2007 he became a producer and writer for the CBS legal drama Shark. He also wrote and produced for the action drama series The Unit.

In 2009, Humphrey wrote the feature film "The Code," which was released in the United States under the title "Thick as Thieves". The film starred Morgan Freeman and Antonio Banderas.

Also in 2009, he joined the staff of the new legal drama The Good Wife, and would go on to produce 135 episodes of the series, writing or co-writing 19 of them. He also directed the season six episode "The Deconstruction."

Humphrey was executive producer/showrunner of the 2016 Syfy series Incorporated and created the 2017 CBS drama Wisdom of the Crowd.

He then developed for television and serves as Executive Producer and Showrunner of the Netflix series The Lincoln Lawyer, based on the novels by Michael Connelly.
