= Elsbeth Tascioni =

Fictional character

- The Good Wife/The Good Fight/Elsbeth character
- First appearance: The Good Wife: "Mock"; May 4, 2010
- Created by: Robert and Michelle King
- Portrayed by: Carrie Preston

In-universe information
- Gender: Female
- Occupation: Attorney at law (formerly); Consultant detective
- Significant others: Mike Tascioni (ex-husband); Angus Oliphant-Donnachaid; Alec Bloom
- Children: Teddy Tascioni

Elsbeth Tascioni (née Guðmundsdóttir) is a fictional character of CBS television series The Good Wife and its spin-offs The Good Fight and Elsbeth. She is portrayed by Carrie Preston, who won a Primetime Emmy Award and was nominated for a second Emmy as well as three Critics' Choice Television Awards for her performance.

== Background ==
Elsbeth, who was originally from Peoria and formerly worked as a lawyer in Chicago, is a consultant detective working alongside the NYPD. She often makes observations at inappropriate times while still being able to stay on task to perform brilliant intellectual maneuvers. She frequently wears very colorful and even outrageous clothing.

Elsbeth has a son, Teddy, who is gay and lives in Washington, D.C. She has a dog named Gonzo, whom she adopts in the first season of Elsbeth.
