= Diane Lockhart =

Fictional character

Diane Lockhart-McVeigh
- The Good Wife & The Good Fight character
- Diane Lockhart-McVeigh, as portrayed by Christine Baranski
- First appearance: The Good Wife: "Pilot"; September 22, 2009; The Good Fight: "Inauguration"; February 19, 2017
- Last appearance: The Good Wife: "End"; May 8, 2016; The Good Fight: "The End of Everything"; November 10, 2022
- Created by: Robert and Michelle King
- Portrayed by: Christine Baranski

In-universe information
- Gender: Female
- Occupation: Attorney at law
- Spouse: Kurt McVeigh (husband)

Diane Lockhart-McVeigh is a fictional character of CBS television series The Good Wife and is portrayed by actress Christine Baranski, who has received acclaim for her performance, such as being nominated for six consecutive Primetime Emmy Awards for Outstanding Supporting Actress in a Drama Series. The character returned as the main character on the sequel series The Good Fight.

== Background ==
A senior partner at her law firm Stern, Lockhart & Gardner, Diane is a liberal champion of women's causes. A photo in her office shows her with Hillary Clinton. She speaks fluent French and seems to have an active social life. She meets Kurt McVeigh, a Republican ballistics expert, and is instantly drawn to him, despite their political differences. She falls in love with him, with the two eventually marrying. Diane's father wanted her to become a senator, although her mother expected her to become a nurse, marry, and have children. Although she is initially skeptical of Alicia Florrick's abilities as a lawyer when she joins the firm, Diane serves as a mentor to her. The two become firmer friends following the death of partner Will Gardner, which affected them both deeply. Diane does not hesitate to tell anyone when she thinks they are wrong. She is often torn between supporting Alicia and Cary Agos, another up-and-coming attorney at the firm, when the two are in competition. In the first episode of The Good Fight, Diane loses all of her money in a Ponzi scheme and is forced out of her longtime firm.

== Spinoff ==
Baranski reprised her role in the spinoff, The Good Fight, along with Cush Jumbo reprising her role as Lucca Quinn. Unlike The Good Wife, the series aired on CBS All Access instead of the CBS network (although the pilot episode was broadcast on the network).

Like the parent series, Diane is a central character of the show. The series revolves around Diane's young goddaughter and legal colleague, who is the daughter of her wealthy college roommate, and who has a troubled family life. Diane runs into trouble of her own in the spinoff series, as she is portrayed talking with her husband about divorce, and has lost much of her fortune in a Ponzi scheme connected with her goddaughter's family.
