= Elsbeth (TV series) =

American television series (2024–present)

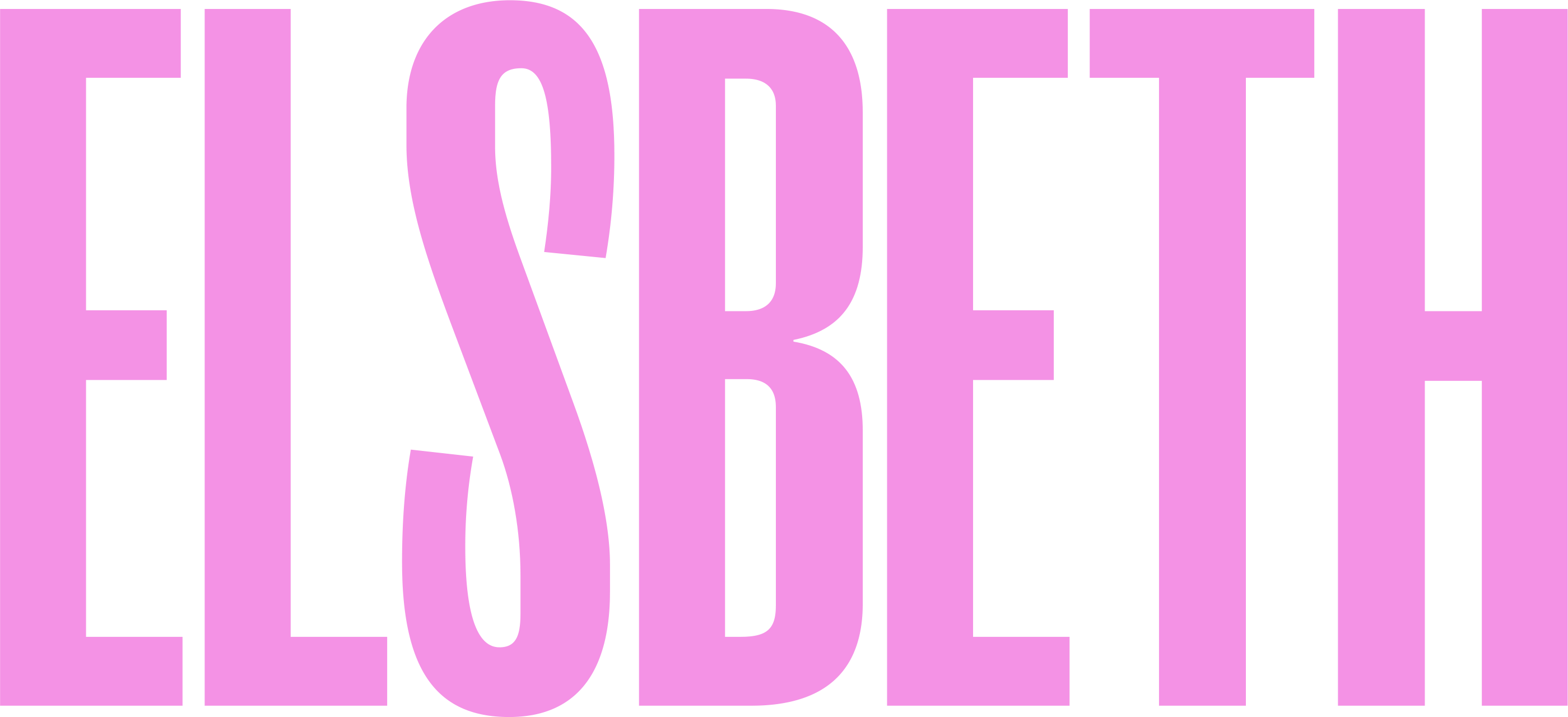
- Genre: Police procedural; Comedy drama
- Created by: Robert King; Michelle King
- Starring: Carrie Preston; Carra Patterson; Wendell Pierce
- Composers: Siddhartha Khosla; Garrett Gonzales
- Country of origin: United States
- Original language: English
- No. of seasons: 4
- No. of episodes: 56

Production
- Executive producers: Jonathan Tolins; Liz Glotzer; Robert King; Michelle King; Bryan Goluboff; Erica Shelton; Gail Barringer
- Producer: Carrie Preston
- Camera setup: Single-camera
- Running time: 43 minutes
- Production companies: Nemorino Productions; King Size Productions; CBS Studios

Original release
- Network: CBS
- Release: February 29, 2024 – present

Related
- The Good Wife; The Good Fight

Elsbeth is an American police procedural comedy drama television series that premiered on February 29, 2024, on CBS. It is a spin-off of The Good Wife (2009–2016) and The Good Fight (2017–2022), in which Carrie Preston originated the role of Elsbeth Tascioni, an unconventional attorney who ends up working as a de facto detective. In April 2024, the series was renewed for a second season, which premiered on October 17, 2024. In February 2025, CBS renewed the series for a third season which premiered on October 12, 2025. In January 2026, the series was renewed for a fourth season which premiered on October 8, 2026.

Most episodes of Elsbeth use the "howcatchem" mystery format rather than the traditional "whodunit", showing the audience from the start who the killer is and how and why they commit the crime, with the balance of the episode focusing on how they are caught, similar to the 1970s Columbo murder mystery series.

== Premise ==
The series focuses on the offbeat Elsbeth Tascioni, an unconventional but astute attorney who, after a successful career in Chicago, uses her singular point of view to make unique observations and corner criminals alongside the NYPD. Ostensibly assigned by the United States Department of Justice to oversee a monitorship or consent decree after some controversial arrests, her real mission initially (revealed over the course of the first season) is to investigate Captain C. W. Wagner for corruption. Most episodes use the inverted detective story format.

== Cast ==
=== Main ===
- Carrie Preston as Elsbeth Tascioni
- Carra Patterson as Kaya Blanke (seasons 1–2; recurring seasons 3-4), a young NYPD officer (later promoted to detective) who befriends Elsbeth
- Wendell Pierce as Charles Wallace (C.W.) Wagner, the Captain of the 11th Precinct

=== Recurring ===
- Danny McCarthy as Agent Fred Celetano (season 1)
- Fredric Lehne as Lieutenant Dave Noonan (season 1)
- Gloria Reuben as Claudia Payne, the wife of C. W. Wagner (seasons 1–2, 4)
- Danny Mastrogiorgio as Detective Bobby Smullen (seasons 1–4)
- Molly Price as Detective Jackie Donnelly (seasons 1–4)
- Micaela Diamond as Detective Samantha Edwards (seasons 1–3)
- Daniel Oreskes as Detective Buzz Fleming (seasons 2–4)
- Ajay Naidu as Martin Wali (season 1)
- Daniel K. Isaac as Lieutenant Steve Connor (seasons 2–4)
- Christian Borle as Carter Schmidt (season 2)
- Ben Levi Ross as Teddy Tascioni, Elsbeth's son (seasons 2–4)
- Hayward Leach as Roy Stratton, Teddy's fiancé, formerly boyfriend (seasons 2–4)
- Michael Emerson as Judge Milton Crawford (season 2)
- Sullivan Jones as Cameron Clayden (seasons 2–3)
- Jenn Colella as Captain Kershaw (season 2)
- Braeden De La Garza as Detective Rivers (seasons 2–4)
- Bianca "b" Norwood as Officer Nikki Reynolds (seasons 2–3)
- Lindsay Mendez as Officer Grace Hackett (seasons 3-4)
- Campbell Scott as Police Commissioner, formerly Captain, Cyrus Tully (seasons 3-4)
- Angus O'Brien as Officer Mike Summerville (seasons 3-4)
- Henny Russell as Winnie Crawford, Judge Crawford's widow (season 3)
- Brittany Inge as Julia Payne Wagner, Captain Wagner's daughter (season 3)
- Sarah Steele as Marissa Gold, Bloom's campaign manager (seasons 3-4)
- Ivan Hernandez as Alec Bloom, Mayor of NYC, formerly mayoral candidate and Elsbeth's boyfriend (season 3)
- Britne Oldford as Detective Nina Taylor (seasons 3-4)
- Christine Ebersole as Lydia Guðmundsdóttir, Elsbeth's mother (season 4)
- Erika Woods as Yvette Stratton, Roy's mother (season 4)
- Damian Young as Glenn Stratton, Roy's father (season 4)

=== Guests ===
- Stephen Moyer as Alex Modarian, a respected drama instructor and professor (seasons 1–2)
- Jane Krakowski as Joann Lenox, a high-end real estate broker (season 1)
- Linda Lavin as Gloria Blecher, a co-op board president (season 1)
- Jesse Tyler Ferguson as Skip Mason, the producer of a reality television series (season 1)
- Retta as Margo Clarke, a matchmaker (seasons 1–2)
- Kelly AuCoin as Declan Armstrong (season 1)
- Blair Underwood as Cliff McGrath, the father and coach of a rising tennis star (season 1)
- Omari K. Chancellor as Hunter McGrath, a rising tennis star (season 1)
- Gina Gershon as Dr. Vanessa Holmes, a cosmetic surgeon (seasons 1–2)
- Keegan-Michael Key as Ashton Hayes, the CEO of a financial firm (season 1)
- Geneva Carr as Poppy Hayes, Ashton's wife (season 1)
- Adam Kaplan as Rob, a dancer/dance instructor (seasons 1–3)
- Elizabeth Lail as Quinn Powers, the creator of a crime-reporting app (seasons 1–2)
- Arian Moayed as Joe Dillon, the owner of a cocktail bar (seasons 1–2)
- Laura Benanti as Nadine Clay, a supermodel (seasons 1–3)
- Andre de Shields as Matteo Hart, a designer (seasons 1–2)
- Daniel Davis as Dr. Yablonski (seasons 1–3)
- Nathan Lane as Phillip Cross, a former lawyer obsessed with opera (season 2)
- Rob Riggle as Neal Dorsey, a paint billionaire (season 2)
- Brittany O'Grady as Mackenzie Altman, a former child actress (season 2)
- Ryan Spahn as Danny Beck, a talent manager (season 2)
- Vanessa Williams as Roslyn Bridwell, a socialite with financial struggles (season 2)
- Becky Ann Baker as Judith, a jewelry store sales associate (season 2)
- Jenn Lyon as Celeste, Roslyn's best friend (season 2)
- Pamela Adlon as Genevieve Hale, a chef with a notorious temper (season 2)
- Jack Davenport as Sam, the maitre d' of Genevieve's restaurant (season 2)
- Vanessa Bayer as DeeDee Dasher, a Christmas curator who is secretly fed up with her life (season 2)
- Laurie Metcalf as Regina Coburn, an actress best known for the television series Father Crime (season 2)
- Dominic Fumusa as Jack Wilson, an actor who stars alongside Regina in Father Crime (seasons 2–3)
- Eric McCormack as Tom Murphy, an alternative medicine guru (season 2)
- Alan Ruck as Bill and Peter Hepson, twin brothers who are businessmen in finance (season 2)
- Ioan Gruffudd as Angus Oliphant-Donnachaidh, a Scottish man who helps Elsbeth catch a murderer (season 2)
- Matthew Broderick as Lawrence Grey, an owner of a college admissions coaching company (season 2)
- Jordana Brewster as Chloe, a lifestyle consultant (season 2)
- Victoria Clark as Deborah Jordan, wife of a real estate developer (season 2)
- Alyssa Milano as Lisette "Pupetta" Del Ponte, a restaurant owner (season 2)
- Tracey Ullman as
  - Marilyn Gladwell, a famous psychic (season 2)
  - Betty Heymouth, a veteran gossip columnist (season 3)
- Jill Eikenberry as Phyllis Pierson, a client of Marilyn Gladwell (season 2)
- Mary-Louise Parker as Freya Frostad, a professional organizer (season 2)
- Jessica Darrow as Taylor, a member of Freya's throuple relationship (season 2)
- David Alan Grier as Arthur Greene Jr., a funeral director (season 2)
- Ethan Slater as Reese Chandler, a police officer (seasons 2-3)
- Billy Magnussen as Rod Bedford, an entitled, rich thrill seeker (season 2)
- John Carroll Lynch as Edwin Dousant, a corrupt judge (season 2)
- Donna Lynne Champlin as Mrs. "Mama" Martin, a prison warden (season 2)
- Stephen Colbert as Scotty Bristol, a late-night host who is the source of a toxic workplace (season 3)
- Amy Sedaris as Laurel Hammond-Muntz, the producer and head writer of Bristol's late-night show (season 3)
- Andy Richter as Mickey Muntz, Laurel's husband and Bristol's co-host (season 3)
- David Cross as Nolan Hurst, a hapless ex-con (season 3)
- Drew Seltzer as Patrick Palmer, a doll salesman (season 3)
- Julia Fox as Raquel Drabowski, a social media influencer (season 3)
- Cathy Moriarty as Marie Drabowski, Raquel's mother-in-law (season 3)
- Annaleigh Ashford as Sharon Norman, a high-strung suburban housewife (season 3)
- William Jackson Harper as Gary Pidgeon, the founder of a struggling poetry journal (season 3)
- Lois Smith as Delores Feinn, one of Gary's longtime donors (season 3)
- Tony Hale as Craig Hollis, a billionaire with a panic room (season 3)
- Dianne Wiest as Constance Mary Cabot, Mother Superior of a convent (season 3)
- David Rasche as Monsignor Frank, Monsignor of the convent (season 3)
- Lindsey Normington as Alaïa Jade, a pop star (season 3)
- Sam McMurray as Coach Russell Willoughby, a high-profile basketball coach (season 3)
- Lana Condor as Peyton Ramsey, Coach Willoughby's girlfriend(season 3)
- Jaime Pressly as Tiffany "Tiff" Ann Giles, a retired supermodel (season 3)
- Andrew Rannells as Harris Monroe, a ballet company board member (season 3)
- Gabriel Ebert as Donovan Chase, an avant-garde director/choreographer (season 3)
- Mike Doyle as Rich Bennett, Harris's husband (season 3)
- Brooks Ashmanskas as Keith Dreyer, the ballet company's technical director (season 3)
- Hamish Linklater as Archer Kopunek, a biohacker (season 3)
- Case Walker as Tyler Hollis, Archer's trainer (season 3)
- Jeff Hiller as Felix West, a wigmaker (season 3)
- Al Sapienza as Domenico Cappelli, a wigmaker (season 3)
- Ali Wentworth as Lina Vyanti, a daytime television host (season 3)
- Paige Turner as a drag queen at a drag bunch (season 3)
- Steve Buscemi as Simon Carroll, a crossword champion (season 3)
- Mo Rocca as the radio host of the crossword championship (season 3)
- Samantha Mathis as Elaine McClusk, a contestant at the crossword championship (season 3)
- Ann Harada as Trudy, a contestant at the crossword championship (season 3)
- J. Smith-Cameron as Isadora "Izzy" Langford, the director of a debutante ball (season 3)
- John Bedford Lloyd as Sterling Barlowe, Izzy's escort at her debutante ball (season 3)
- Don Stephenson as Haydn Langford, Izzy's husband and a wealthy railroad owner (season 3)
- Beanie Feldstein as Rachel Withers, a party planner and sixteen-time bridesmaid (season 3)
- Griffin Dunne as Elliott Pope, an egocentric novelist (season 3)
- Mark Linn-Baker as Barney Corman, a bookstore owner and literary critic (season 3)
- Didi Conn as Beverly Corman, Barney's wife (season 3)
- Joanna Gleason as Maura Davidoff, Elliott's first wife (season 3)
- Constance Wu as Dr. Mallory Haynes, a wealth therapist (season 3)
- Anna Camp as Juliet Woodbent, a tradwife influencer (season 3)
- Erich Bergen as Otis Langley, a celebrity reporter (seasons 3-4)
- Concetta Tomei as Lorena Marchuk, a disgraced socialite (season 3)
- Michael Urie as Monty Blakemont III, an art connoisseur (season 3)
- Patti LuPone as Ruby Lane, a cabaret singer (season 3)
- Nicole Scherzinger as Serena Collyer, a relationship counselor (season 4)
- Nicholas Braun as Jeremy Perrick, a struggling playwright (season 4)
- John Doman as Richard Perrick, Jeremy's late father and a renowned playwright (season 4)
- Betsy Aidem as Sheila Perrick, Richard Perrick's second wife (season 4)
- Tommy Dorfman as Klea Zane, a rival playwright (season 4)
- Isaac Powell as Nelson Thibodeau, an up-and-coming "theater maker" (season 4)
- Traci Wolfe as Connie Thibodeau, Nelson's mother (season 4)
- Richard Thomas as Lenny Swift, Richard Perrick's longtime friend and producer (season 4)
- OG Anunoby as himself (season 4)
- Frank DiLella as himself (season 4)
- Jemima Kirke as Winter Redgrave, the CEO of a lifestyle brand (season 4)
- Greta Titelman as Summer Redgrave, Winter's sister and a pop star (season 4)
- Nat Faxon as Perry Macintyre, an unpopular country club member (season 4)
- Kurt Fuller as Rory Torkelson, an insurance investigator (season 4)
- Sam Richardson as Cody Baxter, an up-and-coming competitive eater (season 4)
- Steven Boyer as Desmond "Desi" Orr, a famed competitive eater (season 4)
- Lea Michele as Darcy Miles, a Pilates trainer (season 4)
- Chloe Troast as Norma Douglass, Darcy's protégé (season 4)
- Uzo Aduba as Alegra Miller, a New Yorker trying to save her home from developers (season 4)
- Tyne Daly as Helen Adler, a birder (season 4)
- Simon Helberg as Briggs Potter, a Revolutionary War reenactor (season 4)
- Molly Shannon as Patty Prince, the creator of a female superhero (season 4)
- Lucas Hedges as "Data" Stevens, the founder and CEO of a prediction market (season 4)

== Episodes ==
=== Series overview ===
Season	Episodes	Originally released		Rank	Avg. viewership (in millions)
Season	Episodes	First released	Last released	Rank	Avg. viewership (in millions)
1	10	February 29, 2024	May 23, 2024	15	7.45
2	20	October 17, 2024	May 8, 2025	6	11.42
3	20	October 12, 2025	May 21, 2026	19	9.0
4	TBA	October 8, 2026	TBA	TBA	TBA

=== Season 1 (2024) ===
No. overall	No. in season	Title	Directed by	Written by	Original release date	U.S. viewers (millions)
1	1	"Pilot"	Robert King	Robert King & Michelle King	February 29, 2024	4.59
In New York City, theatre professor Alex Modarian murders one of his students, Olivia Cherry, who threatened to expose their affair. Alex carefully stages Olivia's death as a suicide and, using a SIM card he had cloned from the one in her phone, sends out suicidal texts to support that premise. Chicago attorney Elsbeth Tascioni arrives to the city, sent by Department of Justice Agent Celetano, under a consent decree to observe the NYPD police, much to Captain Wagner's chagrin. Elsbeth befriends Officer Kaya Blanke, who is investigating Olivia's death with Detective Bobby Smullen, and Elsbeth becomes suspicious of Alex when she finds his notes have two spaces after the periods like "Olivia's" recent texts and she and Kaya learn how Alex gave better parts to the students with whom he was having affairs. Alex tries to frame Todd, his teaching assistant and Olivia's boyfriend, and Wagner orders Elsbeth to apologize to Alex, but she and Kaya dupe him into planting his SIM card cloning tool in Todd's bag where he is caught red-handed by Wagner & Smullen and is arrested. A phone call with Celetano reveals Elsbeth's real mission in NYC: investigating Wagner for corruption.
2	2	"A Classic New York Character"	Robert King	Bryan Goluboff	April 4, 2024	5.43
Gloria Blecher, the loathed president of her co-op board, vetoes a lucrative offer from real estate broker Joann Lenox. Following the rejection, Joann loosens the bolts on Gloria's balcony and Gloria falls to her death. Elsbeth matches liquid chalk residue on the balcony to that used by Joann for rock climbing and she suspects foul play. Elsbeth makes an offer on an apartment in the building and at a meeting with Joann and the board, Elsbeth reveals her theory that all of Gloria's fellow board members played a role in Joann's plot to get rid of Gloria, and the board members immediately turn on Joann. In a shocking twist, it's revealed Joann's father was Gloria's husband, whom Gloria killed after she discovered he was having an affair with their housekeeper, Joann's mother. The corpse of Gloria's husband is recovered in the building, and Joann happily pleads guilty with her revenge arc fully completed. Elsbeth connects Wagner to a man named Martin Wali and a company called FlairAll.
3	3	"Reality Shock"	Ron Underwood	Jonathan Tolins	April 4, 2024	4.60
Skip Mason, a producer for the reality show Lavish Ladies, electrocutes one of his stars, Wendy Wexler, in her bathtub when she attempts to blackmail him. Kaya, a Lavish Ladies superfan, guides Elsbeth through the show, which former star Katricia quit after an inebriated on-camera meltdown. Elsbeth suspects Skip, noticing glitter from Wendy's bath on his hands and on glassware he removed from the bathroom to cover his tracks. A voicemail he left Wendy at the time of her death seems to prove he was with another star, Tracy, and he provides footage painting intern Valencia as a suspect. Kaya tracks down Katricia, who has a high tolerance for alcohol and believes Skip and Wendy drugged her to elicit a meltdown. Rewatching the show, Elsbeth realizes Skip's voicemail used an old sound clip of Tracy. At Wendy's memorial service, Tracy finds a text she sent that contradicts Skip's voicemail, and Katricia confronts Skip. He tries to intimidate her by admitting he killed Wendy, but Elsbeth reveals his confession was captured by a hidden microphone, and Skip is arrested. Elsbeth tries to obtain information on Wali from Lieutenant Noonan, but he proves fiercely loyal to Wagner.
4	4	"Love Knocked Off"	Rosemary Rodriguez	Erica Shelton Kodish	April 11, 2024	4.35
Margo Clarke, a celebrity matchmaker, coaches petty criminal Dennis Pagano to pose as perfect match for her demanding client Lainey Belfort. They are married six months later, fulfilling Margo's contract. After a year of marriage, Dennis visits Margo's home in the Hamptons and announces he will expose the con to Lainey. An angry Margo clubs him to death with a statuette of Cupid, dumping his body and the murder weapon offshore. Captain Wagner assigns Kaya to investigate the disappearance of Lainey's husband, as she is an important donor to Wagner and his wife Claudia's charitable foundation. Suspicious of Margo, Elsbeth deduces that she burned a rug to destroy evidence. Dennis' body is found and identified, leading Kaya and Elsbeth to his ex-girlfriend Tina and a file cabinet full of evidence of his transformation, which was funded by Margo. A previous magazine photoshoot of Margo's home reveals the statuette is missing; Margo hurriedly buys a replacement, but Elsbeth confronts her with the recovered murder weapon, and she is arrested. Invited to Claudia's foundation gala, Elsbeth sees Wagner with the head of FlairAll but chooses not to tell Celetano. Wagner realizes Elsbeth may be investigating him.
5	5	"Ball Girl"	Rob Hardy	Eric Randall	April 18, 2024	4.28
Cliff McGrath, father and coach of professional tennis player Hunter McGrath, is determined for his son to win against top-ranked Johann "Yoyo" Arnaldo. Cliff laces Yoyo's towel with nitroglycerin ointment during a tournament in NYC, noticed by ball girl Ashlee, and Yoyo collapses on the court and dies. Ashlee approaches Cliff with a scheme to win bets on Hunter by sabotaging his opponents, and plants the incriminating towel in Yoyo's hotel room. She tips off the police, leading them to suspect Yoyo's girlfriend Irina, who reveals that she gave him erectile disfunction medication; an inadvertent adverse reaction with the ointment resulted in his death. Wagner, hoping to learn about Elsbeth and her secret investigation, treats her to sushi, but an oshibori leads her to realize how Yoyo died. Ashlee is caught on the hotel's surveillance video, but points out she wouldn't have known who got the drugged towel. Suspicious of Cliff, Elsbeth learns from Hunter that his late mother had the ointment, and Hunter comes to suspect his father as well. In Hunter's final match, he and Elsbeth manipulate Cliff into believing Ashlee has sabotaged his son's towel. Cliff incriminates himself, and he and Ashlee are arrested. Meanwhile, Elsbeth is conflicted after Wagner arranges a new job for her son.
6	6	"An Ear for an Ear"	Nancy Hower	Zoe Marshall	April 25, 2024	4.28
Plastic surgeon Vanessa Holmes is shocked when her protégé Astrid Olsen starts her own rival practice, criticizing her former mentors on social media. Vanessa poses as a patient and proceeds to poison Astrid, then bludgeons her to death. Vanessa flirts with a guard at the Museum of the City of New York to establish an alibi, but the museum is later disrupted by a climate change protest. Elsbeth suspects Vanessa of arranging the fake patient's appointment using fellow surgeon Dr. Yablonsky's phone. Celetano introduces Elsbeth to Martin Wali, who believes Wagner is covering up FlairAll's illegal labor practices in exchange for bribes through his foundation. Elsbeth approaches Wagner about the alleged bribes, but he implies that her son's new job could be viewed in the same light. Paint on Vanessa's shoes is matched to paint from the museum protest, confirming her alibi, but Elsbeth realizes the fake patient's medical history actually belongs to Vanessa's wife, Carolyn. Yablonsky also confirms that Carolyn went to Astrid to correct Vanessa's work. Elsbeth finds evidence in Vanessa's trash that she splattered her own shoes, leading to Vanessa's arrest. Elsbeth lets Kaya in on her investigation into Wagner; meanwhile, Lt. Noonan accepts a bribe from FlairAll on Wagner's behalf.
7	7	"Something Blue"	Yap Fong-Yee	Erica Larson	May 2, 2024	4.23
Wealth management executive Ashton Hayes reveals his unethical business practices to his employee and future son-in-law, Derek. At his bachelor party, Derek blabs Ashton's secret to an exotic dancer named Capri, who was specifically hired by Ashton to test his discretion. Realizing he cannot be trusted, Ashton gets Derek drunk following the wedding and sinks him in the lake via a golf cart. Elsbeth and Kaya doubt Derek's death was accidental when his autopsy determines he suffocated. Ashton's daughter Nora confesses she cheated on Derek with Rob, the wedding choreographer. Elsbeth interviews Rob under the guise of a private dance lesson and he leads her to Capri, who in turn leads her to Ashton. Discovering dissolving tape at Ashton's country club kitchen, Elsbeth realizes Derek died as a result of Ashton gagging him with the tape, while a wedding video shows Derek wearing a watch Ashton gave him, which Ashton took back before killing him. Wagner helps lure Ashton to plant the watch at Rob's dance studio, where Elsbeth intercepts Ashton and talks him into an impromptu dance. The watch falls out and Ashton is arrested. At Elsbeth's housewarming party, Wagner reveals he suspects Noonan of being the real corrupt cop, leaving Elsbeth unsure whom to believe.
8	8	"Artificial Genius"	Tyne Rafaeli	Leah Nanako Winkler	May 9, 2024	4.20
Investigative journalist Josh Johnson prepares an exposé on Cerberus, a crime-reporting app led by entrepreneur Quinn Powers. Using Cerberus to create a fictional cattleprod-wielding dognapper, Quinn plays a prerecorded presentation during a virtual company meeting and sneaks away to Josh's apartment. She beats him to death with a cattleprod, replaces his article with one she wrote, and steals his dog Gonzo to implicate the fictional dognapper. Elsbeth becomes suspicious after neighborhood dog walker Mimi does not recognize the supposedly kidnapped dogs, while Kaya suspects Josh's article was generated with AI. Video of Quinn's meeting reveals that she didn't respond to interruptions and lost her headband during the meeting. At the murder scene, Elsbeth and Kaya find evidence leading them to Quinn's former high school friend Ellen Davis, the true creator of Cerberus. Ellen reveals data flaws that Josh discovered, which Elsbeth confirms by feeding Quinn false information which is later reported on Cerberus. When Mimi finds Gonzo in the park and Elsbeth brings her home, she realizes the dog must have hidden the headband. Elsbeth crashes a Cerberus team meeting and announces the headband was found with Josh's blood on it and Quinn is arrested. Meanwhile, Wagner tells Wali his suspicions about Noonan, promising to bring the corrupt lieutenant down.
9	9	"Sweet Justice"	Kevin Rodney Sullivan	Bryan Golubuff & Erica Shelton Kodish	May 16, 2024	4.26
Cocktail bar owner Joe Dillion learns from Ivy Benson, his favorite customer, about her former college roommate and bully Gemma Nelson. A vengeful Joe strangles Gemma in her sleep, but the police discover it was actually Jane Dunhill, who did a house swap with Gemma, who was killed. Elsbeth suspects Joe, who left a footprint at the crime scene, and Kaya links a mark on Jane's neck to Joe's bottle opener ring. Ivy's online comments toward Gemma make her a suspect, and an angry Gemma unleashes her followers on the NYPD, demanding Ivy's arrest. Joe's regulars reveal he is fiercely protective of his customers, and he admits to Elsbeth that he would do anything for Ivy. Elsbeth stages the arrest of Dion, Joe's employee, who receives a grateful kiss from Ivy, goading Joe into confessing. Joe is arrested, and Ivy tells him off as Gemma's boyfriend Brad breaks up with her, exposing her bullying in a humiliating video. Wagner tells Claudia his suspicions about Noonan, and lures him into a secret meeting with FlairAll's CEO, Declan Armstrong. With Elsbeth recording the incriminating conversation, Wagner intervenes when Noonan pulls a gun, and Noonan and Armstrong are arrested. Wagner is exonerated, but orders Elsbeth back to Chicago for betraying his trust.
10	10	"A Fitting Finale"	Rosemary Rodriguez	Jonathan Tolins	May 23, 2024	4.90
Retiring supermodel Nadine Clay walks her final runway at her soon-to-be-ex-husband Nick Garrison's fashion show, where photographer Ezra Tate is shot dead. Nadine explains that Ezra, her former lover, was desperate for money, and a pawn shop owner reveals Ezra was involved with gambling debts, blackmail, and a mysterious "Pangaea Project". Elsbeth surprises Nadine at the home of designer Matteo Hart, who declares Elsbeth his new muse. Nadine claims Ezra had compromising photos of her, and suspects a jealous Nick killed him. Matteo tells Elsbeth that Ezra and Nadine, as fashion students, created Pangaea Project: a misguided photoshoot of Nadine made up as different ethnicities. Nick tells the police that he suspects Ezra was blackmailing Nadine over Pangaea, and she killed him. At Matteo's fashion show, built around Elsbeth and her unique fashion sense, Elsbeth has an epiphany. She confronts Matteo with Ezra's photos of Nadine's final shoot, where a reflection in a guest's sunglasses reveal Matteo killed Ezra. Matteo also confesses to killing an enforcer who threatened Ezra over his debts, burying him in the backyard, and Elsbeth gives Nadine the Pangaea photos. Wagner changes his mind, fast-tracking Kaya as a detective and convincing Celetano to give Elsbeth her own position investigating corruption in NYC.

=== Season 2 (2024–25) ===
No. overall	No. in season	Title	Directed by	Written by	Original release date	U.S. viewers (millions)
11	1	"Subscription to Murder"	Nancy Hower	Jonathan Tolins	October 17, 2024	4.76
Devoted opera lover Philip Cross is infuriated by the constant disruptive behavior of Eddie Reese, an obnoxious young stockbroker who sits in front of him. Philip follows Eddie home and brutally stabs him to death. Viewing Eddie's selfies from the opera, Elsbeth notices Philip in the background of each one. She and Kaya attend the opera themselves to meet him, and by feigning interest in the opera, Philip invites her to his home. His home is filled with opera memorabilia, including a prop knife with a retracting blade, which was a gift from the baritone of the first opera he ever saw; Elsbeth suspects it was the same knife Philip used to kill Eddie. It is only when the DNA on Eddie's body matches the DNA from an old costume the baritone wore when he performed in New York can Elsbeth prove that Philip stabbed Eddie after turning off the retracting mechanism. Lt. Steve Connor is brought on to replace Noonan and discovers that Kaya does not have the proper credits to enter the police academy and must take classes part-time to earn them. At the end of the episode, Elsbeth is walking her dog when a black SUV pulls up, and an unknown person orders her to enter.
12	2	"The Wrong Stuff"	Aisha Tyler	Erica Shelton Kodish	October 24, 2024	4.45
While going through an exclusive private space training simulation, self-made paint billionaire Neal Dorsey is repeatedly humiliated by renewable energy CEO Gavin Morrissey. Neal becomes bitterly jealous when another trainee, Randy, showers Gavin with admiration, leading him to retaliate by sabotaging Gavin's boots so when Gavin enters a centrifuge, he is killed in an explosion. Elsbeth investigates while dealing with a handsome fire marshal who constantly flirts with her. She quickly learns of Neal's rivalry with Gavin and the tension between Neal and Randy, Neal's son. When Elsbeth discovers the explosion was caused by a lithium battery in Gavin's shoe lifts and that Gavin's hoverboard stopped working shortly before his death, she theorizes the battery came from there, but Neal has already replaced it with another stolen battery. However, when Elsbeth pries out the new battery, she finds a gold tip from a pen specifically customized for Neal. The tip allows Elsbeth to seal the case, and Neal is arrested. The person in the black SUV is revealed to be Elsbeth's old colleague, Carter from Chicago, who tells her one of their clients from a divorce case they handled is now divorcing a second time, and details of the previous case are causing issues with the new one. Carter strictly orders Elsbeth not to discuss either case under threat of retribution from the firm.
13	3	"Devil's Night"	Robin Givens	Bryan Goluboff	October 31, 2024	4.84
Mackenzie "Mac" Altman, a former child actress turned party girl, wakes up on Halloween morning with no memory of the night before, except possibly killing someone. Elsbeth helps Mac retrace her steps, only for them to stumble upon the body of Mac's friend, Sonny Miller. Mac soon becomes the prime suspect and cannot help her case, while her lawyer/manager, Danny, refuses to let Elsbeth get involved. Despite this, Elsbeth manages to track Mac's movements to a bar where she was not long before Sonny was killed. Elsbeth realizes that Mac did kill Sonny, but Danny, who had been embezzling from Mac's estate, orchestrated the murder by drugging Mac at the bar and manipulating her to do it. Danny and Mac are arrested, but Elsbeth assures Mac that she cannot be held liable for the murder due to Danny incapacitating her. Lt. Connor posts an opinion sheet at the precinct, which shows morale has been low since Noonan's arrest, while suggesting Wagner's leadership skills are faltering. Connor insists this problem be corrected, which Wagner discusses with his wife as he contemplates how to do so.
14	4	"Diamonds Are for Elsbeth"	Mary Lou Belli	Zoe Marshall	November 7, 2024	4.25
Socialite Rosalyn Bridwell plans a heist with her best friend, Celeste, to rob Vivienne's, an exclusive jewelry store, after the new creative director, Valentina, bars them from attending the store's grand reopening. When Rosalyn realizes one of their associates in the heist plans to expose them, Rosalyn poisons him with cyanide in his tea, while feigning to be poisoned herself. Elsbeth suspects that Rosalyn faked being poisoned and discovers her shaky finances. When she goes to Rosalyn's apartment, she realizes that Vivian's employee Judith and jewelry broker Huey are members of the heist group. When questioned, Judith confesses to the planned heist and is offered a deal to avoid arrest. That night, when Rosalyn, Celeste, Huey, and Judith put their plan into action, Elsbeth, Kaya, Wagner, and Detective Donnelly interrupt them, and they are arrested. However, Judith subsequently flees to Paris, having stolen all of Rosalyn's jewelry from her apartment. Kaya moves in with Elsbeth while her home is being renovated and insists on paying rent. Elsbeth initially refuses, however, she concedes on the condition that they have a mandatory fro-yo night.
15	5	"Elsbeth Flips the Bird"	Ron Underwood	Sarah Beckett	November 14, 2024	4.30
Renowned chef Genevieve "Veev" Hale plans to entertain a VIP at her exclusive restaurant, but his table is double-booked. When she discovers her kitchen staffer Jordan deliberately double-booked the table as payback for her explosive temper, she attacks in the kitchen in a fit of rage, only to find he filmed it on his phone. She then strangles him, deletes the video and inflicts injuries on herself to make it appear that an unknown assailant attacked them both and left her unconscious. Elsbeth investigates with Edwards and doubts Veev's story upon learning of her violent history, the VIP being a luxury hotel chain owner with whom Veev wanted to secure a contract, and Jordan's scheme to sell table reservations. While trying to cook Veev's duck confit, requiring the bird to be turned over during cooking, Elsbeth realizes Veev could not have been unconscious at the time like she claimed, and Veev is arrested. Lt. Connor discovers that Elsbeth and Kaya are living together, prompting Kaya to worry about her promotion. Meanwhile, pop star Tru-Rose asks Elsbeth to help her in her divorce case against Elsbeth's former client Van Ness, but Elsbeth is constrained to refuse.
16	6	"Gold, Frankincense, and Murder"	Rachel Raimist	Erica Larson	December 5, 2024	4.40
Christmas-curating power couple Dirk and DeeDee Dashers are preparing to launch their new vintage decor collection. DeeDee declares that she is sick of the Christmas paraphernalia and wants out of the marriage, but Dirk refuses to agree to a divorce, fearing that it will tarnish their brand. Dirk plans to murder her by electrocuting her when she switches on the light show. However, DeeDee discovers his plot and sets a trap of her own by tampering with a display's wires, which end up fatally electrocuting Dirk when he tries to fix a faulty light bulb. Elsbeth and Kaya investigate the "accident" and soon uncover both Dirk's murder plot and his affair with an assistant to the Dashers' publicist. Elsbeth solves the case by proving that DeeDee foiled Dirk's plan by wearing black shock-proof gloves, and that DeeDee, being colorblind, failed to realize the faulty lightbulb has broken the color pattern of the lights. Kaya has aced her college classes and is now preparing to move out of Elsbeth's apartment, leaving Elsbeth all alone for the holidays. Meanwhile, Wagner asks Elsbeth to help him find a gift for Claudia, and Elsbeth suggests couples' dance lessons. Kaya and Wagner surprise Elsbeth by inviting Teddy to New York for the holidays.
17	7	"One Angry Woman"	Lionel Coleman	Eric Randall	December 12, 2024	4.59
Delia Bates has a sexual rendezvous with her neighbor, Andy Mertens, in his apartment. When Delia goes to use the shower after their tryst, judge Milton Crawford enters Andy's apartment and bludgeons him to death. Delia is charged with Andy's murder, and Crawford presides over her trial. Elsbeth is appointed to Delia's jury and soon notices that Crawford appears to be manipulating the proceedings in the prosecution's favor. Regardless, Elsbeth manages to find evidence that someone else was at the apartment that night, though she cannot identify the individual. Nevertheless, the evidence is enough for the jury to exonerate Delia. After the trial, Elsbeth finally begins to realize Crawford may be the actual killer, but has nothing to prove her suspicions. Elsbeth's son Teddy is still staying with her, and Kaya shows him around New York. Despite having a good time, Teddy insists on knowing why his mother left Chicago so abruptly, which Elsbeth struggles to explain. Lt. Connor starts trying to improve the precinct by making a big deal out of minor complaints from the detectives, but Wagner convinces him to ease up.
18	8	"Toil and Trouble"	Darren Grant	Matthew K. Begbie	December 19, 2024	3.48
TV actress Regina Coburn is about to leave her longtime role on police procedural Father Crime so she can perform in a London production of Macbeth, with her character being placed in a coma to accommodate her absence. However, the showrunner, Calvin Reed, blindsides Regina by rewriting the scripts to appease the network, obligating her to stay in New York. Outraged by the missed opportunity, Regina murders Cal with the heel of a stiletto shoe in his eye, mirroring an original script written by an obsessed fan. Elsbeth, however, believes Regina is the murderer after discovering the fallout between her and Cal and proves her guilt with the discovery that Regina only read her own lines in the scripts, thus not realizing that the stiletto referred to in the script was a knife. Meanwhile Kaya invites Cameron Clayden, a handsome medical examiner to move into the spare room in her newly renovated house. Elsbeth confides in Wagner that she suspects Crawford of being the real killer in the Delia Bates trial. Kaya and Crawford both discover Elsbeth's role in the Van Ness case after the identities of the legal team are exposed on the national news.
19	9	"Unalive and Well"	Nancy Hower	Leah Nanako Winkler	January 30, 2025	4.31
A young man, Cole Campbell, dies in his car after leaving a holistic wellness center run by self-styled guru Tom Murphy. Elsbeth goes with Detective Smullen and Kaya to investigate the center, and Elsbeth joins the retreat, where she is forced to confront unpleasant memories from her past. With her investigation at the center and evidence provided by Kaya, Elsbeth establishes that Tom has continued using poisonous frog venom as a treatment contrary to a legal settlement following the death of Cole's sister ten years earlier. Together, they establish that to prevent his practice from being exposed, Tom injected mustard seed oil into the junk food in Cole's car, causing him to have a fatal allergic reaction. Kaya questions Elsbeth about her involvement in suppressed evidence in the Van Ness case, that he was a domestic abuser. Captain Wagner suggests to Captain Kershaw that Elsbeth review the Delia Bates case. (Note: "One Angry Woman" Season 2 Episode 7)
20	10	"Finance Bros"	Nick Gomez	Anju Andre-Bergmann & Eric Randall	February 6, 2025	4.80
Bill Hepson decides to resign from the venture capital firm he started with his twin brother Peter, give away his money and live a simple life. This infuriates the ambitious Peter, who dresses up as Bill to enter his building, and he pushes Bill out of a window to his death while conducting a live broadcast phone interview to establish his alibi. Elsbeth's suspicions turn to Peter after a local donut vendor that Bill frequented had misidentified Peter as Bill that morning. Further investigation shows Peter had invested in a VPN company that misidentified the location of his call. Elsbeth finds that a five dollar bill he used was a rare bill that Bill had only picked up from his safety deposit box that morning, leading to Peter's arrest. Elsbeth traps Van Ness into publicly threatening her, and he is arrested, thus forfeiting his attorney-client privilege. This enables Elsbeth to defend herself against allegations of suppressing evidence in Ness's first divorce case.
21	11	"Tiny Town"	Robert King	Zoe Marshall	February 13, 2025	4.62
Small town musician Angus Oliphant-Donnachaidh is at his local cafe in Scotland watching live streaming scenes in Manhattan on the Iris when he sees a young woman get mugged and then suffocate to death. The victim is cosmetics researcher Hayley Ritter, whose death is ruled as a fentanyl overdose. With Angus' help, Elsbeth finds a journalist Hayley was communicating with and to whom she was passing information via a box of chocolates. However, he is found dead from a fentanyl overdose. Elsbeth suspects that Hayley was a whistleblower and was about to expose the presence of a dangerous carcinogen in one of the company's products. Angus describes the man who grabbed the chocolates and who may have killed her as wearing a tartan scarf. As Elsbeth questions the cosmetic company security manager, Howard Thorwald, in his office, she sees his tartan scarf and realizes that he is the murderer. Just as Thorwald is about to spray her with a perfume bottle filled with deadly fentanyl, Kaya and Wagner bust into his office and arrest him. The episode is set around Valentine's Day. As the case unfolds, romance blossoms between Angus and Elsbeth, Kaya and Dr. Cameron Clayden, and Wagner surprises Claudine by dancing with her after completing his dance lessons.
22	12	"Foiled Again"	Sam Hoffman	Jonathan Tolins	February 20, 2025	4.60
Lawrence Grey runs OutMatch, a college admissions coaching company whose former client Ethan Brooks, the new admissions director for Baden University, resents Lawrence for having his parents steer him to pursue Ivy League schools instead of his passion for acting and refuses to admit any applicants from OutMatch. Recognizing the threat Ethan poses to his business, Lawrence challenges Ethan to a fencing duel, then places enough cat dander in Ethan's helmet to trigger a fatal asthma attack. Lawrence tries to frame the university mascot, Quad Cat, but Elsbeth and her team rule out the notion once they learn the animal was hypoallergenic. To avoid suspicion, Lawrence claims his cat Veritas has died, which infuriates his daughter Mandy, who has taken an extended break between high school and college. When Elsbeth suspects Lawrence lied about Veritas dying, Mandy finds the cat at a shelter, providing enough evidence to arrest Lawrence. The investigation causes Elsbeth to fear she led Teddy down the wrong path, which comes to a head at a celebratory dinner at Elsbeth's for Kaya's completion of her college course requirements, when it is revealed that Wagner had gotten Teddy his job. Teddy reconciles with his mother at the behest of his boyfriend Roy, to whom Elsbeth takes a liking. Judge Crawford tries to intimidate Elsbeth when he learns that Wagner has reopened the Delia Bates case, but Elsbeth calls his bluff.
23	13	"Tearjerker"	Peter Sollett	Leah Nanako Winkler	February 27, 2025	4.82
After a lavish dinner with his "lifestyle consultant" Chloe, aging real estate tycoon Nathan Jordan is found dead the following morning by his separated wife Deborah and her doctor boyfriend Jason Yamamoto. The couple lived with Nathan as his caregivers after they had Nathan declared medically incompetent. Elsbeth is joined by Wagner's new protege, brash young Detective Rivers, who immediately suspects Deborah and Jason after finding a pentobarbital pill bottle. Using Nathan's bank records, Elsbeth tracks down Chloe, who had dined with Nathan on the night of his death, but denies going to his apartment. Elsbeth solves the case after several clues indicate that Nathan's death was assisted suicide, and that Chloe stole the medication from Jason for him to consume willingly on his last night alive. Nathan intended to frame Deborah and Jason for his death as payback for locking him in a conservatorship. When Elsbeth confronts Chloe with evidence that she was Nathan's "agent", Chloe confidently replies that she has access to excellent defense attorneys.
24	14	"Scenes From an Italian Restaurant"	Robin Givens	Bryan Goluboff	March 6, 2025	4.78
Elsbeth takes Teddy and his boyfriend, Roy, on a "famous NYC crimes tour," which includes an Italian restaurant called Pupetta's. In July 1998, it was the site of mob soldier Goldie Moresco's murder, igniting a mob war that eliminated both the Del Ponte and Nova crime families. The only survivor was Lisette "Pupetta" Del Ponte, the daughter of the Del Ponte capo and the restaurant's namesake. When Pupetta's husband, Gene, a longtime waiter who witnessed Goldie's murder, is injured in a hit-and-run after agreeing to meet Elsbeth, she suspects Pupetta is behind it. Working with Kaya and Fleming, the original detective investigating the case, Elsbeth arranges to exhume Goldie's body. The exhumation reveals one of Pupetta's fingernails embedded in Goldie's remains, and using DNA evidence, Elsbeth proves that Gene Jr. was Pupetta's son with Goldie, and that Pupetta killed Goldie in a fit of rage when he refused to marry her, then blamed Eddie, which sparked the war.
25	15	"I See... Murder"	Rob Hardy	Sarah Beckett & Wade Dooley	March 13, 2025	4.74
Psychic Marilyn Gladwell convinces her client Phyllis Pierson that her late husband wants her to sell his snack company, Butterwell Treats, to its main competitor. Phyllis' stepson, Tim, distrusts Marilyn and forbids the sale, but days later, he is found dead in Central Park, shot with an arrow. Recently promoted Detective Kaya, Elsbeth and new officer Nicki Reynolds uncover that Tim was catfished in a dating app by someone using a fake profile. Further investigation reveals that Marilyn's alibi is false; she was raised in Bucks County, Pennsylvania, where the arrow was made, and that she has shares in the company seeking to buy Butterwell Treats. Elsbeth enlists Phyllis to lay a trap and trick Marilyn into revealing that she catfished Tim, leading to her arrest. During the episode, Marilyn reveals eerily accurate details of Elsbeth and Wagner's pasts and then has a foreboding vision for Elsbeth.
26	16	"Hot Tub Crime Machine"	James Whitmore Jr.	Erica Larson & Jonelle Lightbourne	April 3, 2025	4.49
Decluttering expert Freya Frostad grows jealous of her husband Axel's close relationship with their female mutual lover Taylor, wanting Taylor to herself. Freya conspires to murder Axel by waiting until he is alone in their hot tub and uses an app to remotely cause a robotic vacuum cleaner to close the cover, trapping him inside and causing him to drown. When Elsbeth finds evidence that Axel has had many near-death experiences since Taylor joined them, she becomes suspicious of Freya. It is only when Elsbeth exposes Freya as a secret hoarder, secretly keeping everything she encouraged others to declutter, including poisonous old rolls of flypaper, that she is arrested for Axel's murder.
27	17	"Four Body Problem"	Bille Woodruff	Erica Shelton Kodish & Sarah Beckett	April 10, 2025	4.54
Russell Greene, a stubborn conspiracy theorist, threatens to destroy his family's funeral home legacy by exhuming the casket of famous novelist L.D. Longacre to prove that she faked her death because the casket was too light. His uncle and current funeral director, Arthur Greene Jr., beats Russell to death with a shovel and hides his corpse at the funeral home. When Russell's YouTube channel auto-posts a video declaring himself dead the following morning, his fellow conspiracy theorist, Barb, is convinced of his death. Elsbeth then decides to investigate his disappearance along with chatty new hire, Officer Chandler. She questions Arthur's ageing father, Randolph, about the burial. He confesses that he mistakenly sent Longacre's body to be cremated instead of his beloved dog's remains, so they placed the dog's body in the casket with Longacre's ashes. Elsbeth arrives with the police at the funeral home's latest ceremony just in time to arrest Arthur before he can cremate Russell's body.
28	18	"I Know What You Did Thirty-Three Summers Ago"	Joe Menendez	Matthew K. Begbie & Eric Randall	April 24, 2025	4.97
Flashbacks reveal that Crawford murdered Andy Mertens (Note: As shown in "One Angry Woman".) because he was the only witness to Crawford's first killing back in 1991; Crawford killed a woman named Sherry when she rejected his advances, and he bribed Andy with a college scholarship to never speak of it. With Crawford now being vetted for the federal bench, Elsbeth and her team are more dedicated than ever to bringing him down. While Crawford gloats to Elsbeth about his victory and thwarting her before he is appointed, he is fatally shot by Delia Bates, who is incensed by Crawford's ability to evade justice and for ruining her life. The incident leaves Elsbeth traumatized, and her team is completely demoralized by the turn of events. However, Wagner tries to rally the group by reminding them that nothing changes if they don't try.
29	19	"I've Got a Little List"	Lily Mariye	Erica Shelton Kodish	May 1, 2025	4.60
Rod Bedford, the anhedonic heir to a wealthy family, adds "getting away with murder" to his long bucket list. He assassinates a seemingly homeless person on the streets of New York, only to discover that he had unwittingly murdered a European crown prince when he visits the crime scene and talks to Elsbeth. ICE agent Wes McCarthy arrives on the scene and blames a fringe anti-royalist group of feminists for the killing, although Elsbeth becomes convinced that Bedford is the killer. She is arrested for criminal harassment after trying to look at Renolds' notebook in an exclusive club and sent to jail, from where she provides clues to prove that Bedford is the killer, leading to his arrest. Unfortunately, Edwin Dousant, the presiding judge in Elsbeth's harassment case, blames her for the death of his friend Judge Crawford and abuses his power by ensuring Elsbeth is transferred to a detention center housing some of the murderers she helped convict.
30	20	"Ramen Holiday"	Lionel Coleman	Jonathan Tolins	May 8, 2025	4.69
While in prison, Elsbeth is reunited with several killers she busted during her time in New York: Alex Modarian, Margo Clarke, Vanessa Holmes, Quinn Powers, Joe Dillon, Pupetta del Ponte, Freya Frostad, and Matteo Hart. She is also surprised by how the warden, Mrs. Martin, allows considerable freedom and trading among the prisoners. Modarian mentions an upcoming transfer to a nicer unit, but he is stabbed to death before it happens. Elsbeth looks into Modarian's murder and learns from Pupetta that ramen can be molded and hardened into effective weapons. A bowl of ramen was beside Modarian when he died in the library with a particular smell. Upon discovering that Genevieve Hale (Note: The chef and killer from "Elsbeth Flips the Bird".) was temporarily held at the prison after her arrest, Elsbeth recognizes the distinctive smell, which meant that Hale made the knife, and only Mrs. Martin could have had it. Elsbeth accuses her of the murder because Modarian threatened to expose her black market operation in exchange for his transfer. Wagner manages to have Elsbeth released after he confronts Edwin Dousant, the judge who had Elsbeth unfairly detained, with information that Crawford bribed him so he could hear the Andy Mertens case.

=== Season 3 (2025–26) ===
No. overall	No. in season	Title	Directed by	Written by	Original release date	U.S. viewers (millions)
31	1	"Yes, And..."	Joe Menendez	Jonathan Tolins	October 12, 2025	4.74
Talk show host Scotty Bristol is killed in a freak accident set up by his executive producer Laurel Hammond. Fed up with his tyrannical antics, Laurel lures Scotty to his office under the guise of a tryst; she then sticks Scotty's tie in the shredder and turns it on, effectively strangling him to death. The detective on the case immediately suspects the long-suffering sidekick Mickey as the culprit, but Elsbeth ascertains that his grief over Scotty's death is genuine.
32	2	"Doll Day Afternoon"	Robert King	Robert King & Anju Andre-Bergmann	October 16, 2025	3.41
Toy store manager Patrick Palmer tries to swindle a customer, Nolan Hurst, out of $6,000 for a rare doll. When an upset Nolan demands his money back, a scuffle for the cash ensues and leads to Patrick falling and suffering a fatal head injury. Elsbeth identifies Nolan as the killer right away, at which he grabs a gun from an unsuspecting police officer and holds the store hostage. Elsbeth agrees to replace one of the hostages and finds Nolan is an ex-con who was trying to reconnect with his daughter by getting her the doll, only to find she no longer wants it. Drawing on her defense attorney background, Elsbeth gets Nolan to explain his side of the story and offers legal assistance. Meanwhile Wagner clashes with Captain Tully, who brings in a sniper, which concerns Teddy, since one of Tully's marksmen previously hit the wrong person. Elsbeth brings Nolan out of the store safely by having him surrounded by her and the other hostages dressed the same, the only one who is shot is a doll. As Nolan is arrested Elsbeth promises to put him in touch with Diane Lockhart as he shares one last look with his daughter.
33	3	"Good Grief"	Ron Underwood	Bryan Goluboff	October 23, 2025	3.48
Raquel Drabowski, whose husband Johnny supposedly died in a helicopter crash in Puerto Rico, has made a career out of her widowhood, gaining success as a "grief influencer" and starring on a reality dating show for widows. When Johnny shows up on her doorstep, threatening Raquel's fame and fortune, Raquel kills him by shoving him off the Staten Island ferry with sandbags harnessed to his belt. Elsbeth joins Fleming and Hackett on the investigation when Johnny's mother Marie reports receiving a phone call from him, which the police confirm, only to find Johnny's corpse in the Hudson River. Further investigation shows that Johnny had never gotten on the helicopter and had been having multiple affairs in Puerto Rico. This shocks Raquel, who claims to have been doing a live webcast at the time of the murder, but Hackett points out that the video could have been recorded in advance. As Raquel rebrands herself as a "betrayal influencer," Elsbeth exposes her, noting that Raquel's videos include a shrine of Johnny's belongings, including his harness that had been replaced, as the old one was found with his body, getting Raquel arrested. Meanwhile, Elsbeth finds Kaya now doing undercover work in Staten Island and the two catch up, during which Elsbeth mentions that she and Angus broke up but Wagner warns her not to get too involved. By the end, he gives Elsbeth a burner phone to call Kaya once, but the call fails to go through.
34	4	"Ick, A Bod"	Lionel Coleman	Erica Larson	October 30, 2025	3.79
Sleepy Hollow housewife Sharon Norman has disliked her neighbor Beryl Nix as Beryl's free-spirited nature clashes with Sharon's rigid personality. When Sharon's beloved towering maple tree, of which Beryl frequently complained, suspiciously dies, Sharon suspects Beryl. Sharon agrees to help Beryl assemble a haunted maze for Halloween, where she decapitates Beryl with a chainsaw and attempts to frame the crew of horror prop suppliers. When Beryl's body turns up in New York Elsbeth joins Donnelly on the investigation while celebrating "Halloweek" by dressing as Eliza Dolittle with a different costume each day. Elsbeth learns how Sharon's controlling behavior has impacted her family and how the tree likely died from foul play, establishing a motive. Though Sharon claims she was on her porch dressed as a scarecrow all night on Halloween, video footage shows her not moving at the time of Beryl's death, and a trick-or-treater's fingerprints on a identical-looking mannequin deflates her alibi. A search warrant turns up Beryl's remains in the pipes of Sharon's washing machine, at which Sharon is arrested and her husband admits he poisoned the tree. Meanwhile, Wagner is concerned about his daughter Julia spending time with Cameron, who is in a long-distance relationship with Kaya, upsetting Julia. Wagner finally accepts Julia is not a little girl anymore, only to find she is seeing Rivers.
35	5	"Poetic Justice"	Robin Givens	Leah Nanako Winkler	November 6, 2025	3.73
Struggling poetry journal publisher Gary Pidgeon is desperate when he learns his longtime patron, Delores Feinn, is planning to change her will leaving a promised large gift to a rival publication instead. Reeling from the betrayal, Gary comes up with a solution to inherit her fortune; he opens the valve on Delores’s oxygen tank, then calls her from a party and tells her to write, knowing that Delores will light a cigarette for inspiration, causing an explosion that kills her. Elsbeth is at the party with Dr. Yablonski, who points out that Delores didn't actually use her oxygen tank. Wagner, stil displeased with Rivers seeing Julia, assigns him to the case. Elsbeth learns that Dolores was actually nearly broke while pretending to be wealthy and that Gary only published her terrible poetry to keep her as a benefactor. Acting on a tip, Elsbeth suggests to Gary that the oxygen discolored his jacket, making him frantic to recover it, leading him to confess. After Gary is arrested, Elsbeth notes Rivers' improved behavior. Meanwhile, Marissa Gold sets Elsbeth up with mayoral candidate Alec Bloom, publicizing their supposed relationship.
36	6	"Bunker Down"	Nick Gomez	Erica Shelton Kodish	November 13, 2025	3.58
Paranoid fintech billionaire Craig Hollis traps his crisis manager Anders Whitman in Craig's state-of-the art panic room, erratically believing that Anders will report his "indiscretions" to his company's board of directors.
37	7	"And Then There Were Nuns"	Peter Sollett	Matthew K. Begbie	November 20, 2025	4.20
Controversial pop star Alaïa Jade purchases the fading Convent of Our Lady of Grace and Mercy, despite the disapproval of Reverend Mother Constance Mary Cabot. To save the nuns' home, Constance opens the dangerous bell tower and convinces Alaïa to view the sunset from there. When Alaïa does, Sister Darby, whose watch has been reset by Constance, rings the bell, knocking Alaïa from the tower to her death. Elsbeth investigates with Reynolds and Smullen, and suspects foul play upon finding the tower's danger sign has been moved. Meanwhile Alaïa's producer Shane Sills, who owns her raw material, becomes the convent's buyer. Constance, knowing Elsbeth is on to her, confesses to Monsignor Frank, who aspires to become bishop, to get him to block the investigation, but Elsbeth subverts this by attending the convent's food drive to which she was invited and bringing Jack Wilson from Father Crime, of whom the nuns are fans. Shane releases a posthumous Alaïa Jade single, with lyrics Elsbeth recognizes as Constance's words about the sunset view, proving she talked Alaïa into climbing the bell tower when the bell would be rung. Constance is arrested but the popularity of the food drive saves the convent by getting it landmarked. Meanwhile, Teddy locates Pete, the transit worker who allegedly helped Alec when he was homeless, however Pete doesn't recognize Alec, for whom Elsbeth is falling.
38	8	"Basket Case"	Mary Lou Belli	Eric Randall	December 4, 2025	N/A
Peyton Ramsey, the outspoken much younger girlfriend of college basketball coach Russell Willoughby, is banned from the campus by athletics director Dave Coppins because of her interference in the training program. Shortly afterwards, Coppins is found bludgeoned to death in an alley. Detective Nina Taylor, on transfer from another precinct, initially suspects Ramsey, but Elsbeth doubts that she is the killer. When Elsbeth finds a bug in the locker room, she suspects that coach Willoughby has been eavesdropping on his players. After she learns that Coppins had disparaged him, Willoughby becomes the prime suspect. She then sets a trap that causes him to plant evidence on a player, thus exposing him as the murderer.
39	9	"Glamazons"	Rob Hardy	Bryan Goluboff	December 11, 2025	N/A
Tiff Giles, a once famous supermodel whose career swiftly ended after losing her eye in a freak accident, is invited to New York for a reunion by her former rival Madison Fortune. When Tiff realizes Madison and her husband TJ had set up the incident to sabotage her career, Tiff plans her revenge. She joins the event, after which she serves Madison a drugged drink in a glass with TJ's fingerprints and pushes her off the balcony, intending to frame him for the murder. Elsbeth investigates with Hackett and Fleming, and after speaking with Nadine Clay, doubts that TJ would kill Madison, whom he adored. TJ admits to the attack after his alibi is confirmed and he is assured about the statute of limitations, pointing suspicion to Tiff. Hackett performs at a comedy club, which Wagner and Elsbeth attend, to find Wagner is the target of the jokes. Elsbeth sees Ivy Benson, now the club's bartender, pocketing the foil she removes from the bottles. Inspired, the police find a foil cap from the wine bottle used for the drugged drink, with Tiff's thumbprint, resulting in Tiff's arrest.
40	10	"A Hard Nut to Crack"	Ron Underwood	Sarah Beckett & Anju Andre-Bergmann	December 18, 2025	N/A
The Midtown Ballet Company allows avant-garde director Donovan Chase to replace their annual performance of The Nutcracker with a darker rendition that incorporates a dangerous set piece known as "The Contraption" and does not include any children. Board member Harris Monroe, whose daughter Noelle had been aiming for the part of Clara and will age out next year, arranges a physical therapy appointment nearby at the time of The Contraption's demonstration, during which he sneaks out to tamper with the device so that it crushes Donovan to death. As Elsbeth investigates with Donnelly and Hackett she suspects Harris for his fixation on Noelle's career, as the company returns to its original Nutcracker and the girl is cast as Clara. Elsbeth finds video footage from a Broadway show near the PT clinic that films its actors walking outside the theatre, but it shows Harris attended his appointment at 3:00 PM like he claimed. Hackett notices one of the actors looking up, and she and Elsbeth question him, a swing in the show, who admits to filming his performance. This video shows Harris rushing to and from the demonstration, plus stage blood from the site is found on the windowsill of the clinic. Harris is arrested, but the police allow him to first see Noelle perform as Clara. Meanwhile, Elsbeth's son Teddy tells Wagner that he has found flaws in Alec's background, and Wagner advises Elsbeth to be careful.
41	11	"Ol' Man Liver"	Scott Ellis	Eric Randall & Matthew K. Begbie	February 26, 2026	N/A
Wealthy biohacker Archer Kopunek undertakes a strict diet and exercise regimen to achieve perfect health, though his liver isn't optimal. He hires Tyler, a genetically-advantaged young drifter, as a live-in trainer and plasma donor, but Tyler tires of Archer's routine and decides to leave. Unwilling to lose a possible liver donor, Kopunek switches bio-tracking rings with Tyler, feigns heart problems so the tracker will alert the hospital, kills Tyler with an injection of air bubbles, and then switches rings back before the paramedics arrive. A year later, Elsbeth meets Cord, who received Tyler's heart as a transplant and has been having nightmares which he attributes to cell memory. She questions other recipients of Tyler's organs, who have similar experiences, and decides to investigate Archer, joined by Reynolds and Rivers. Elsbeth finds that Archer had his trainers sign contracts making him the recipient of their organs in case of death, and she suspects he killed Tyler to obtain his liver. Elsbeth eventually deduces that Archer killed Tyler while their rings were being updated at midnight and the data showing Archer's cellular age being much younger than Tyler's proves he switched the rings, getting Archer arrested. Meanwhile, Julia splits up with Rivers and Teddy is taken off investigating Alec because Marissa reported that Alec and Elsbeth are a couple. As Teddy breaks the news to his mother, he learns that she and Alec have been intimate.
42	12	"All's Hair"	Mary Lou Belli	Erica Shelton Kodish & Wade Dooley	March 5, 2026	N/A
Prominent wigmaker Felix West, who specializes in hairpieces for burn victims and businessmen, wants more glamorous clients. When daytime television host Lina Vyanti hires Felix to make a wig matching her rare color, he doesn't have enough hair, leading him to steal a young woman's ponytail. Domenico Cappelli, who had previously made Lina's wigs, finds out and tries to blackmail Felix, who strangles Domenico with the cord of a curling iron, then steals some of Domenico's high-priced wigs to make it look like a botched robbery. Elsbeth investigates with Smullen and Chandler, and suspects Felix after learning he already accepted Lina's offer. Felix invites Elsbeth to a drag bunch, where one of the stolen wigs is spotted, implicating Persimmon, who makes drag queens' wigs, but she has an alibi. Meanwhile a major donor to Wagner's foundation has the police investigate his teenage daughter being supposedly bullied; it turns out it was her ponytail Felix stole. Elsbeth notices that a hair in a jar of sauce Domenico's mother gave her, made the night of the murder, matches the wig hairs on Felix's apron and he is arrested. At the same time, Teddy isn't speaking to Elsbeth, while Winnie Crawford wants to meet with her to discuss Alec. By the end, Teddy reaches out to his mother, but Winnie is planning to use Teddy to dig up dirt on Alec.
43	13	"Murder Six Across"	John Aronson	Sarah Beckett	March 12, 2026	N/A
At a crossword puzzle tournament, longtime champion Simon Carroll is infatuated with another contestant, recently-divorced Elaine McClusk, but she has accepted a dinner invite with the editor Morris Long. When Simon confronts Morris, a dispute ensues where Morris disqualifies Simon, prompting Simon to asphyxiate him with a swag bag. While continuing the tournament, Simon keeps Morris' body on ice, sends emails from Morris' tablet, then disposes of Morris' body in the woods out of town. After the body is found, Elsbeth, a former crossword addict, investigates with Edwards and learns about Simon's love triangle and his constant complaining over Morris' use of slang and modern pop culture, as the latest crossword is full of highbrow words Morris didn't use. When another contestant points out that Morris brought a trunk full of old crosswords as practice, and security footage shows Simon leaving with the trunk, Elsbeth heads to the town where the body was found, but can't find the trunk. She does see a coin-operated newspaper box and correctly figures that Simon bought a newspaper there, leaving his fingerprints on the coins. Simon is arrested as Elaine wins and rejects Simon for murdering Morris. Meanwhile, Elsbeth's relationship with Teddy is still strained while Winnie Crawford publicly attacks Alec. Elsbeth holds a family dinner, where she finally realizes Alec is a liar.
44	14	"Deadutante"	Peter Sollett	Erica Larson	April 2, 2026	N/A
Isadora "Izzy" Langford, director of the Empire City Debutante Ball, is forced to allow the inclusion of Plum, the daughter of Sterling Barlowe, who publicly humiliated Izzy at her own debut years before, and whom she never forgave. At the ball, Izzy sends a text from Plum's mother's phone, diverting her escort for a rendezvous, leaving his ceremonial sword outside. Izzy uses the sword to stab Sterling to death while wearing another deb's gloves, which she then burns in the fireplace. As Elsbeth and Detective Taylor investigate, they learn Izzy's history with Sterling and her efforts to regain her social standing since her debut. Izzy claims Elsbeth stole the missing gloves, but Elsbeth locates the remains of the gloves, which belonged to Jackie Onassis Kennedy, in the fireplace of the room where the murder occurred, proving her guilt. After confronting Winnie Crawford over the attack ads, Elsbeth demands Alec tell the truth about his past, despite Marissa's disapproval. The episode ends as Alec is about to address a press conference.
45	15	"Otherwise Enraged"	Lionel Coleman	Leah Nanako Winkler	April 9, 2026	N/A
Rachel Withers, who is constantly planning her friends' parties, throws a party for herself when she inherits a villa from her late aunt, only nobody shows up. Rachel confronts her best friend, Kimberly Brooks, who admits she told their social circle not to come because of Rachel's narcissistic behavior. Livid, Rachel bludgeons Kimberly to death with a cast-iron pot and puts it in the dishwasher, then plants a similar-looking pot on Kimberly's husband Howie when he comes home drunk. Elsbeth, with Donnelly, notes that the pot Howie holds is a different shade than the lid nearby. Elsbeth learns what happened at Rachel's party and that Rachel wasn't there at the time of the murder like she claimed. Rachel then presents a man she met on the way home and whom she claims to have been with all night, although Elsbeth suspects Rachel bribed him to provide an alibi. After reviewing Rachel's social media posts, Elsbeth notices that Rachel's damaged high heels from the party left tell-tale marks on Kimberly's floor, which lead to Rachel's arrest. At Julia's instigation, Wagner tries to discourage Rivers, her ex-boyfriend, from coming to his anniversary party, but later Julia approaches Rivers and explains that he is still welcome. Meanwhile, Alec Bloom comes clean publicly about his past lies. He invites Elsbeth to watch E.T. the Extra-Terrestrial, a film he lied about seeing, and is brought to tears, but Elsbeth is still skeptical of his honesty.
46	16	"Murder, He Wrote"	Robin Givens	Jonathan Tolins	April 16, 2026	N/A
Egocentric novelist Elliot Pope allows bookstore owner and critic Barney Corman to review his latest manuscript. When Elliot arrives at the bookstore Barney gives a scathing critique, at which Elliot topples over the bookcases, crushing Barney to death. Eighteen months later, Elsbeth is at a signing of one of Elliot's books whose plot is similar to how Barney died and raises questions, which Elliot dismisses. After looking at the bookstore Elsbeth suspects that the death was not accidental, especially since the store was closed early, getting the case reopened and Connor and Hackett involved. Elsbeth meets with Elliot's ex-wife Maura, whom Barney sent his reviews of Elliot's books, and learns more about Elliot's misogyny and predatory behavior. Elsbeth eventually proves Elliot was at Barney's bookstore as his habit of licking his thumb before turning the pages resulted in his DNA being left on a rare copy of Howards End Barney was planning to sell the day he was murdered. As the mayoral election approaches, Marissa Gold informs Wagner that he is being considered for police commissioner. Alec wins, but Elsbeth breaks up with him because she cannot trust him. Marissa then informs Wagner that Captain Tully became commissioner.
47	17	"High Class Problems"	Stephen Surjik	Sarah Beckett & Bryan Golubuff	April 30, 2026	N/A
Dr. Mallory Haynes, a "wealth therapist" specializing in problems of the upper class, uses information gathered from her clients' sessions to do insider trading. One of her clients, Jason Rathbone, invites her to his house, where he confronts her about it and threatens to expose her. Later that night Mallory, having access to Jason's garage, detaches the brakes on his motorcycle, causing him to drown in the East River. Kaya, who has completed her undercover assignment, reunites with Elsbeth as they investigate. They find that Jason and many of Mallory's other clients were under scrutiny by the SEC, and when confronting Mallory, she blames her boyfriend Evan, who proposed to her the night of the murder. When meeting with one of Jason's neighbors in the diner Mallory was at that night, Elsbeth notes that the counterman has a voice like Evan heard when Mallory called him, and the owner confirms that Mallory was there twice that night, the second time using all the soap and paper towels. Elsbeth and Kaya show the ring Evan gave her was damaged by brake fluid matching that at the garage, which gets Mallory arrested. Kaya admits to Cameron that doing undercover work made it hard for her to adjust to her former identity, and they need time apart. After solving the case she and Elsbeth bond while watching Black Veil in their pajamas.
48	18	"Murder From Scratch"	Pamela Adlon	Erica Shelton Kodish & Jonelle Lightbourne	May 7, 2026	N/A
Tradwife Juliet Woodbent, who makes everything from scratch, is filmed by documentarian Audra Miller. When Miller reveals that Juliet mistakenly used lard in a meal she made for her husband's vegan boss, Juliet has a tirade, which Audra records and insists on releasing. Juliet arrives at Audra's apartment with a homemade cleaning tablet containing baking ammonia and urges Audra to mix it with bleach and clean her bathroom with it. As Audra dies from chloramine gas, Juliet steals the hard drive with the revealing footage and stashes it in her closet. Elsbeth and Smullen go to Juliet, and notice she uses baking ammonia in her cooking and that Audra was focused on how unhappy Juliet really was as the hard drive goes missing. Elsbeth finds that Juliet's children put the hard drive in her chicken coop and confronts Juliet with the footage, causing her to break down from stress as she is arrested. Tully orders Wagner to let go of Fleming, who is at mandatory retirement age. Elsbeth insists on keeping him, leading to Wagner agreeing to a poker game with Tully over Fleming's career. Elsbeth notes Tully cheating and informs Wagner, allowing Fleming to stay on the force, but Wagner knows Tully will retaliate.
49	19	"Catch and Kill"	Nancy Hower	Eric Randall & Anju Andre-Bergmann	May 14, 2026	N/A
Daytime talk show host Otis Langley blackmails gossip columnist Betty Heymouth, demanding control of her column. Betty goes to Otis' trailer dressed like her friend Lorena Marchuk, a disgraced socialite Otis frequently targets, and shoots Otis in the back with a pistol, leaving a burner phone to implicate him as gossip blogger Pop Lunatic. Elsbeth and Fleming find the gun in Lorena's apartment, leading to her arrest, but Elsbeth notes that Lorena's apartment door had a button allowing it to remain unlocked, and that Betty's column featured the shooting although the deadline was before the police released the information. Meanwhile, Wagner becomes suspicious of Tully when much-needed improvements are made to the police station. As reports of Otis' abusive behind-the-scenes behavior come out, it is revealed that Betty is actually Pop Lunatic, which violates her newspaper contract. Betty attacks Elsbeth and Tully in her column, bringing up a call Elsbeth made to Otis' show, which gets her upbraided by Tully, who reveals that it was Alec who allowed the funds to the station to not appear biased after Elsbeth dumped him. Elsbeth has Nadine Clay give a report on her relationship with Alec Bloom, which appears in Betty's column, but the fabricated claim was only sent to Pop Lunatic, which gets Betty arrested.
50	20	"That's All"	Joe Menendez	Jonathan Tolins	May 21, 2026	N/A
Cabaret star Ruby Lane is a regular performer and resident at the Hotel Reilly, where Sebastian, an English Duke, comes to vote on selling the building. Ruby, who does not want the building sold, bludgeons the Duke with an award she displays during her performance, then arranges it to look like he slipped in the shower. Elsbeth investigates with Wagner, with Kaya working undercover in the building. The police initially suspect Monty Blakemont, an art connoisseur who informs them that selling the hotel would require longterm residents' financial records being audited. Elsbeth also learns that Ruby is deeply in debt to the hotel and while she claimed to have been watching her appearance on Father Crime she did not know that a major scene she did was cut. After learning from Ruby's accompanist that Ruby did not present her award at her show right after the duke's death, Elsbeth confronts Ruby during her show, showing that the marks on the trophy match a large shoehorn she used to pry off the shower bar, leading to her arrest. Meanwhile, Teddy and Roy are considering marriage, and Elsbeth suggests a lavish proposal, but Teddy isn't interested. After storming off, he runs into Wagner, who recounts his own proposal. Following the case's resolution, Teddy sings "That's All" to Roy, and the two become engaged.

=== Season 4 (2026) ===
No. overall	No. in season	Title	Directed by	Written by	Original release date	U.S. viewers (millions)
51	1	"Crazy in Love"	Nancy Hower	Sarah Beckett	October 8, 2026	3.75
Renowned marriage counselor Serena Collyer has been having an extramarital affair with musician Casey Arthurs. When Casey announces that he intends to stay in New York longer than expected, Serena, knowing it will jeopardize her marriage, texts another client, Luke, that Casey is sleeping with his wife, causing Luke to come to Casey's apartment and beat him up, after which Serena shoots Casey dead. Elsbeth, investigating with Hackett and Smullen, gets suspicious when Luke's fingerprints are found on the door handle but not the gun. Elsbeth finds that Luke was Serena's client and that she and Casey were seeing each other. After noting Serena bought an expensive bottle of wine found at the crime scene, Elsbeth confronts her with a bracelet Casey gave her, which has Casey's blood and gunshot residue, which gets Serena arrested. Meanwhile, Smullen is more irritable than usual because, as Elsbeth finds out, he and his wife are separated. Plus, Teddy and Roy set May 1 as their wedding date, and Elsbeth hasn't been answering her mother's calls.
52	2	"Death of a Playwright"	Scott Ellis	Jonathan Tolins	October 15, 2026	3.32
After renowned playwright Richard Perrick dies, the rights to revise one of his early works go to up and coming writer Nelson Thibodeau instead of Richard's son Jeremy. After the last performance of his play, the car in which he's loading the props reverses, knocking Nelson down a flight of stairs to his death. Elsbeth investigates with Donnelly and suspects murder, figuring the car would have been still for several minutes before it hit Nelson. Meanwhile Jeremy is allowed to do the revision, while finding himself haunted by the ghost of his father. As Jeremy is suspected, his mother Sheila covers for him, claiming they both were at a light-dimming ceremony for Richard. When Richard's producer Lenny Swift contradicts this Jeremy admits he was at a bar, and the bartender confirms his alibi. In the end, Elsbeth shows that Lenny is Jeremy's actual father and Nelson was Richard's son, and Sheila killed Nelson for the sake of Jeremy's career, as she knew her way around the subways to kill Nelson and make it to the light-dimming ceremony just in time. Meanwhile, under pressure from Tully, Wagner has Donnelly's overtime audited as she is dealing with financial troubles. Elsbeth tries to help but ultimately Donnelly is fired. As she and Elsbeth bond, Elsbeth gets a call from her mother.
53	3	"Consciously Unsistered"	Joe Menendez	Leah Nanako Winkler	October 22, 2026	3.13
Sisters Winter and Summer Redgrave tried out for a reality talent competition, but only Summer was chosen. As Summer became a pop star, Winter started a lifestyle brand, Kreem, which Summer wants to sell to a major retailer against Winter's wishes, citing a drag-along clause as an early investor. To stop the sale, Winter gives her employees an impromptu detox, during which she sneaks out and tampers with a compression suit Summer uses, causing her to asphyxiate. Elsbeth investigates with Taylor and doubts the death was accidental as the frayed hose suggests a struggle between her and someone else. Winter claims to have been in a deprivation tank during the time of the murder and names an ex-employee, Paul, as the culprit. As an angry Paul is taken into custody, Elsbeth discovers Summer's attempt to sell Kreem and that Winter could have easily gotten out of the tank. Paul finally admits his alibi—he was procuring rare bugs for Winter's personal products. Such bugs are identified as an ingredient in a nail polish chip found at the crime scene, which gets Winter caught. Elsbeth's mother Lydia comes into town, disrupting Elsbeth's life as she makes herself welcome at the precinct. In the end, Elsbeth tries to reconnect with Lydia before Teddy and Roy get married, but Lydia refuses.
54	4	"A Bad Lie"	Ron Underwood	Eric Randall	November 5, 2026	TBD
Perry Macintyre, an officious and disliked member of New Jersey's Nickerson Country Club, appears to have scored a prize-winning hole-in-one at the club's golf tournament. When club president Trip Langenhagen catches Perry looking for his ball in the nearby woods, showing Perry the ball to prove he cheated, Perry strikes Trip dead with a stone from a well and moves the body to a fallen tree branch. Elsbeth goes to the club with Lydia, Teddy and Roy to visit Roy's parents, Glenn and Yvette, at the club, and Elsbeth bonds with hole-in-one insurance investigator Rory Torkelson as Lydia constantly criticizes her. Elsbeth and Rory search the woods and find the bloodied stone, proving murder, and meet with a neighbor on whose property the ball actually landed. Perry uses his influence to get Elsbeth banned, but she returns showing tree sap that matches the fallen branch was found on Perry's ball, leading to his arrest. Glenn and Yvette are pleased as Elsbeth and Rory part ways. Meanwhile, Tully oversees community outreach at the precinct, but his interference gets him embarrassed in front of the press. Tully reprimands Wagner, who later confides in Elsbeth that he might not want to stay on the force.
55	5	"All About Eats"	Rob Hardy	Matthew K. Begbie	November 12, 2026	TBD
Competitive eating champion Desi Orr takes on up-and-comer Cody Baxter as a mentee and personal assistant. When Desi finds that Cody has been drugging him he fires Cody and threatens to report him if he shows up at eating contests. At Coney Island, where Desi attempts to eat fifty donuts in five minutes, Cody adds a drugged donut to the plate, causing Desi's death. Elsbeth investigates with Fleming and Summerville and the autopsy shows an overdose of blood pressure medication and a GLP-1 drug. As Cody enters a hotdog eating contest Elsbeth finds that Cody has been sabotaging his competitors by giving them GLP-1s, which he got from his grandmother Mimi. The day of the contest, as Cody wins, Elsbeth shows that the medication used to kill Desi was not for Mimi but for her dog, and the syringe used to deliver them had traces of filling from the donuts, which gets Cody arrested. Meanwhile Wagner has the precinct compete in a softball tournament, only to have Elsbeth express concern that he is driving the team too hard. When they compete against Ladder 44, with Fire Marshall Jake pitching, Elsbeth asks to go up to bat and gets walked, winning the precinct the game.
56	6	"Lean Girls"	Nick Gomez	Anju Andre-Bergmann	November 19, 2026	TBD
Pilates trainer Darcy Miles makes a meek newcomer, Norma Douglass, her protégé. After a year of rigorous training, Norma decides to leave to do traditional Pilates on her own. Fearing that Norma is stealing her clients, Darcy goes to Norma's studio and challenges her to a workout, where Darcy strangles Norma in a reformer, then cleans up the area, gathering the beads from her necklace broken in the process. Elsbeth investigates with Taylor and Hackett, and notes that the beads on Darcy's necklace are out of order. She also learns that Norma's studio was private and while Darcy claimed to have been exercising at home at the time of the murder, with her stats posted online, Taylor points out that the stats could have been faked. Elsbeth suggests to Darcy that a missing bead from her necklace might be at the crime scene, which will be searched again, leading Darcy to sneak back in, but the search was just a ruse to catch her. Darcy, realizing her fears were misguided, breaks down as Elsbeth holds her. Meanwhile, criticism of Hackett's stand-up comedy prompts her to upload a response video. Wagner, displeased by the negative attention, demands that she choose between her police work and comedy. Marissa Gold arrives to announce the mayor is pleased with the video and invites her to promote the NYPD.
57	7	"Holdout for a Hero"	Stephen Surjik	Bryan Goluboff	December 3, 2026	TBD
58	8	"Birder Most Fowl"	Stephen Surjik	Bryan Goluboff	December 10, 2026	TBD

== Production ==
=== Development ===
CBS ordered a pilot in January 2023. It was a straight-to-series order, with CBS Studios joining the production of the series. Shortly after the premiere, creators Robert and Michelle King stated that although the character of Elsbeth Tascioni originated on The Good Wife, they do not consider Elsbeth to be a spin-off but a "separate show" inspired by Columbo that happens to use a "character in [their] wheelhouse". On April 18, 2024, CBS renewed the series for a second season. On February 20, 2025, CBS renewed the series for a third season. On January 22, 2026, CBS renewed the series for a fourth season.

=== Casting ===
Carrie Preston reprises her role as Elsbeth Tascioni from The Good Wife and The Good Fight. Also, Wendell Pierce joined as C.W. Wagner, and Carra Patterson joined in the role of Kaya Blanke.

The Kings have indicated that, while they avoided recycling actors for different characters on The Good Wife and The Good Fight, Elsbeth would not adhere strictly to the Good series' shared universe, and therefore some guest stars from the earlier series, such as Linda Lavin, would appear as different characters in Elsbeth. On May 1, 2025, it was reported that Patterson would exit as a series regular, but was set to return in a guest star capacity for the third season.

=== Filming ===
After the show was ordered to series, the rest of the first season began shooting in January 2024 and wrapped in late April 2024. The first season of the series was filmed in New York and consists of 10 episodes.

During a conversation with the press and an open audience to promote the Spanish release of the whole first season, Preston stated that season 2 consists of 20 episodes. Filming on the second season started on July 23, 2024.

Filming on the fourth season started on July 21, 2026.

== Release ==
The first season of Elsbeth premiered on February 29, 2024, on CBS, though due to programming conflicts, subsequent episodes did not begin airing weekly until April 4. The show is available to stream on Paramount+. The second season premiered on October 17, 2024, on CBS. The third season premiered on October 12, 2025. The fourth season premiered on October 8, 2026.

In Canada, the series airs on Global and is streaming on StackTV.

In Australia, it premiered on Paramount+ on April 26, 2024.

In the UK, it premiered on Sky Witness on July 23, 2024.

In Germany on Sky One on August 6, 2024.

In Southeast Asia, it premiered on AXN Asia on January 30, 2025.

in Italy on Rai 2 on February 1, 2025.

== Reception ==
The review aggregator website Rotten Tomatoes reported a 94% approval rating with an average rating of 7.2/10, based on 31 critic reviews. The website's critics consensus reads, "Carrie Preston's standout character from The Good Wife makes for a great detective in this amiable and clever spinoff." Metacritic, which uses a weighted average, assigned a score of 71 out of 100 based on 15 critics, indicating "generally favorable reviews".

=== Ratings ===
Viewership and ratings per season of Elsbeth
Season	Timeslot (ET)	Episodes	First aired		Last aired		TV season	Viewership rank	Avg. viewers (millions)	18–49 rank	Avg. 18–49 rating
Season	Timeslot (ET)	Episodes	Date	Viewers (millions)	Date	Viewers (millions)	TV season	Viewership rank	Avg. viewers (millions)	18–49 rank	Avg. 18–49 rating
1	Thursday 10:00 p.m. (1, 3–9); Thursday 9:00 p.m. (2, 10)	10	February 29, 2024	4.59	May 23, 2024	4.90	2023–24	15	7.45	56 (Note: Tied with Jeopardy! Masters and So Help Me Todd.)	0.47
2	Thursday 10:00 p.m. (1–17); Thursday 9:00 p.m. (18–20)	20	October 17, 2024	4.76	May 8, 2025	4.69	2024–25	21	11.5	TBD	TBD
3	Sunday 9:30 p.m. (1); Thursday 10:00 p.m. (2–6, 8–16, 20); Thursday 9:00 p.m. (7, 17–19)	TBA	October 12, 2025	TBD	TBA	TBD	2025–26	TBD	TBD	TBD	TBD

==== Season 1 ====
Viewership and ratings per episode of Elsbeth
No.	Title	Air date	Rating/share (18–49)	Viewers (millions)	DVR (18–49)	DVR viewers (millions)	Total (18–49)	Total viewers (millions)	Ref.
1	"Pilot"	February 29, 2024	0.3/4	4.59	—N/a	—N/a	—N/a	—N/a	
2	"A Classic New York Character"	April 4, 2024	0.3/4	5.43	0.19	2.64	0.53	8.07	
3	"Reality Shock"	April 4, 2024	0.3/4	4.60	0.18	2.84	0.47	7.44	
4	"Love Knocked Off"	April 11, 2024	0.3/4	4.35	—N/a	—N/a	—N/a	—N/a	
5	"Ball Girl"	April 18, 2024	0.3/4	4.28	0.22	3.20	0.50	7.47	
6	"An Ear for an Ear"	April 25, 2024	0.2/2	4.28	0.21	3.15	0.45	7.43	
7	"Something Blue"	May 2, 2024	0.3/3	4.23	0.22	3.20	0.49	7.43	
8	"Artificial Genius"	May 9, 2024	0.2/3	4.20	0.23	3.25	0.44	7.44	
9	"Sweet Justice"	May 16, 2024	0.3/3	4.26	0.21	3.09	0.47	7.34	
10	"A Fitting Finale"	May 23, 2024	0.3/3	4.90	—N/a	—N/a	—N/a	—N/a	

==== Season 2 ====
Viewership and ratings per episode of Elsbeth
No.	Title	Air date	Rating/share (18–49)	Viewers (millions)	DVR (18–49)	DVR viewers (millions)	Total (18–49)	Total viewers (millions)	Ref.
1	"Subscription to Murder"	October 17, 2024	0.3/3	4.76	0.21	3.52	0.48	8.28	
2	"The Wrong Stuff"	October 24, 2024	0.3/3	4.45	0.20	3.43	0.47	7.88	
3	"Devil's Night"	October 31, 2024	0.3/4	5.82	0.21	3.26	0.53	8.10	
4	"Diamonds Are for Elsbeth"	November 7, 2024	0.2/2	5.31	0.20	3.36	0.42	7.61	
5	"Elsbeth Flips the Bird"	November 14, 2024	0.3/3	5.40	0.20	3.24	0.47	7.55	
6	"Gold, Frankincense, and Murder"	December 5, 2024	0.2/3	4.40	0.20	3.21	0.43	7.61	
7	"One Angry Woman"	December 12, 2024	0.2/3	4.59	0.17	3.17	0.41	7.76	
8	"Toil and Trouble"	December 19, 2024	0.2/2	3.48	0.19	2.99	0.39	6.47	
9	"Unalive and Well"	January 30, 2025	0.2/4	4.31	0.20	3.43	0.43	7.74	
10	"Finance Bros"	February 6, 2025	0.3/4	4.80	0.21	3.08	0.49	7.88	
11	"Tiny Town"	February 13, 2025	0.2/4	4.62	0.19	3.09	0.42	7.71	
12	"Foiled Again"	February 20, 2025	0.3/3	4.60	0.20	3.25	0.45	7.85	
13	"Tearjerker"	February 27, 2025	0.3/5	4.82	0.20	3.17	0.51	7.99	
14	"Scenes From an Italian Restaurant"	March 6, 2025	0.3/4	4.78	0.19	3.22	0.46	8.01	
15	"I See... Murder"	March 13, 2025	0.2/3	4.74	0.21	3.14	0.44	7.88	
16	"Hot Tub Crime Machine"	April 3, 2025	0.3/4	4.49	0.21	3.34	0.49	7.83	
17	"Four Body Problem"	April 10, 2025	0.3/4	4.54	0.19	3.40	0.45	7.94	
18	"I Know What You Did Thirty-Three Summers Ago"	April 24, 2025	0.3/3	4.97	0.17	2.92	0.41	7.85	
19	"I've Got a Little List"	May 1, 2025	0.2/3	4.60	0.15	2.88	0.39	7.48	
20	"Ramen Holiday"	May 8, 2025	0.3/4	4.69	0.16	2.82	0.48	7.51	

==== Season 3 ====
Viewership and ratings per episode of Elsbeth
No.	Title	Air date	Rating/share (18–49)	Viewers (millions)	DVR (18–49)	DVR viewers (millions)	Total (18–49)	Total viewers (millions)	Ref.
1	"Yes, And..."	October 12, 2025	0.3/3	4.74	0.19	2.64	0.52	7.38	
2	"Doll Day Afternoon"	October 16, 2025	0.1/2	3.41	0.15	2.37	0.29	5.78	
3	"Good Grief"	October 23, 2025	0.2/2	3.48	0.18	2.65	0.35	6.13	
4	"Ick, A Bod"	October 30, 2025	0.2/2	3.79	0.16	2.45	0.32	6.23	
5	"Poetic Justice"	November 6, 2025	0.2/2	3.73	0.11	2.04	0.27	5.78	
6	"Bunker Down"	November 13, 2025	0.2/3	3.58	TBD	TBD	TBD	TBD	
7	"And Then There Were Nuns"	November 20, 2025	0.2/2	4.20	TBD	TBD	TBD	TBD	

=== Accolades ===
Year	Award	Category	Nominee(s)	Result	Ref.
2024	Golden Nymph Awards	Fiction	Elsbeth	Nominated	
2024	Astra Awards	Best Broadcast Network Drama Series	Elsbeth	Nominated	
2024	Astra Awards	Best Actress in a Broadcast Network or Cable Drama Series	Carrie Preston	Nominated	
2024	Astra Awards	Best Supporting Actor in a Broadcast Network or Cable Drama Series	Wendell Pierce	Nominated	
2024	Astra Awards	Best Supporting Actress in a Broadcast Network or Cable Drama Series	Carra Patterson	Nominated	
2024	Astra Awards	Best Directing in a Broadcast Network or Cable Drama Series	Rosemary Rodriguez (for "Love Knocked Off")	Nominated	
2024	Astra Awards	Best Writing in a Broadcast Network or Cable Drama Series	Jonathan Tolins (for "A Fitting Finale")	Nominated	
2024	Astra Awards	Best Guest Actress in a Drama Series	Retta	Nominated	
2024	AAFCA TV Honors	Best TV Acting – Male	Wendell Pierce	Won	
2024	Women's Image Awards	Drama Series	Elsbeth (for "Pilot")	Nominated	
2024	Women's Image Awards	Actress Drama Series	Carrie Preston (for "Pilot")	Won	
2024	Celebration of Black Cinema and Television	Actor – Series	Wendell Pierce	Honored	
2025	Artios Awards	Outstanding Achievement in Casting for a Television Pilot and First Season – Drama	Mark Saks, Findley Davidson, John Andrews	Nominated	
2025	Writers Guild of America Awards	Television: Episodic Drama	Robert King, Michelle King (for "Pilot")	Nominated	
2025	Astra Awards	Best Actress in a Drama Series	Carrie Preston	Nominated	
2025	Astra Awards	Best Guest Actor in a Drama Series	Ethan Slater	Nominated	
2025	Astra Awards	Best Cast Ensemble in a Broadcast Network Drama Series	Elsbeth	Nominated	
2026	Critics' Choice Awards	Best Comedy Series	Elsbeth	Nominated	
2026	Critics' Choice Awards	Best Actress in a Comedy Series	Carrie Preston	Nominated	
