= List of awards and nominations received by The Good Wife =

Awards and nominations received by The Good Wife
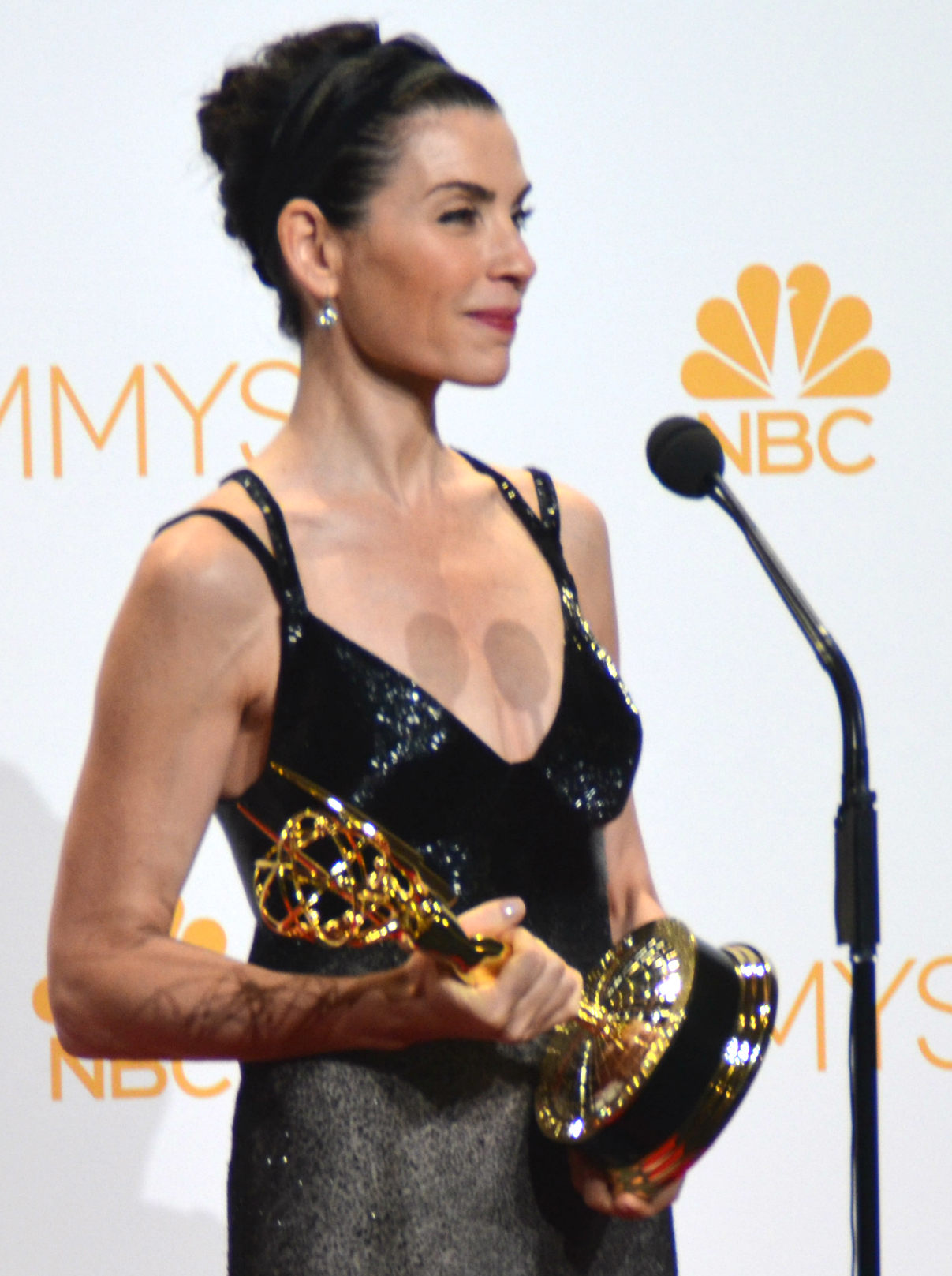
- Julianna Margulies received various awards and nominations for her portrayal of Alicia Florrick.
Awards and nominations
Award	Wins	Nominations
AFI Awards	2	2
American Cinema Editors Award	0	4
Artios Award	4	7
BMI Film & TV Awards	1	1
British Academy Television Awards	0	2
Crime Thriller Awards	0	3
Critics' Choice Television Award	2	22
Dorian Awards	1	5
Environmental Media Awards	0	1
Golden Globe Awards	1	14
Golden Nymph Awards	0	3
Golden Reel Awards	0	1
Humanitas Prize	1	1
NAACP Image Award	1	3
Peabody Award	1	1
People's Choice Awards	2	7
Primetime Emmy Awards	5	43
PRISM Awards	0	1
Producers Guild of America Awards	0	1
Satellite Award	0	12
Screen Actors Guild Award	2	9
Television Critics Association Awards	2	8
TV Guide Awards	0	7
Women's Image Network Awards	0	1
Writers Guild of America Awards	1	7
Young Artist Award	0	3

Totals (Note: Certain award groups do not simply award one winner. They acknowledge several different recipients, have runners-up, and have third place. Since this is a specific recognition and is different from losing an award, runner-up mentions are considered wins in this award tally. For simplification and to avoid errors, each award in this list has been presumed to have had a prior nomination.)
- Wins: 26
- Nominations: 169

The Good Wife is an American television legal and political drama series that aired on CBS from September 22, 2009, to May 8, 2016. Created by Robert and Michelle King, the show follows Alicia Florrick (Julianna Margulies), wife to disgraced and imprisoned politician Peter Florrick (Chris Noth), who begins working at the law firm Stern Lockhart Gardner after 13 years of not practicing law. Rounding out the main cast are Matt Czuchry, Archie Panjabi, Graham Phillips, Makenzie Vega, Alan Cumming, Zach Grenier, Matthew Goode, Josh Charles and Christine Baranski.

The Good Wife has garnered critical praise for the performances of the casts, most notably Margulies, the series' storylines, and its use of technology. Since its premiere in September 2009, the series has been nominated for 43 Primetime Emmy Awards (winning five), 14 Golden Globe Awards (winning one), 12 Satellite Awards, 9 SAG Awards (winning two), 6 TCA Awards (winning two) and 22 Critics' Choice Television Awards (winning two), among others.

Margulies stands as the most decorated cast member, winning two Emmy Awards, a Golden Globe Award, a TCA Award and two SAG Awards for her role as Alicia Florrick, as well as receiving the most award nominations. Principal cast members Baranski, Charles, Cumming and Panjabi have also received award nominations for their respective roles as well as several recurring actors, most notably Martha Plimpton, Dylan Baker, Michael J. Fox and Carrie Preston.

== Awards and nominations ==
Award	Year	Category	Nominee(s)	Result	Ref.
AFI Awards	2011	Television Program of the Year	The Good Wife	Won	
AFI Awards	2013	Television Program of the Year	The Good Wife	Won	
American Cinema Editors Awards	2012	Best Edited One-Hour Series for Commercial Television	Hibah Schweitzer (for "Real Deal")	Nominated	
American Cinema Editors Awards	2013	Best Edited One-Hour Series for Commercial Television	Scott Vickrey (for "Hitting the Fan")	Nominated	
American Cinema Editors Awards	2014	Best Edited One-Hour Series for Commercial Television	Scott Vickrey (for "A Few Words")	Nominated	
American Cinema Editors Awards	2015	Best Edited One-Hour Series for Commercial Television	Scott Vickrey (for "Restraint")	Nominated	
Artios Awards	2010	Outstanding Achievement in Casting – Television Pilot – Drama	Mark Saks & Michelle Allen	Won	
Artios Awards	2010	Outstanding Achievement in Casting – Television Series – Drama	Mark Saks	Won	
Artios Awards	2011	Outstanding Achievement in Casting – Television Series – Drama	Mark Saks	Won	
Artios Awards	2012	Outstanding Achievement in Casting – Television Series – Drama	Mark Saks & John E. Andrews	Won	
Artios Awards	2013	Outstanding Achievement in Casting – Television Series – Drama	Mark Saks & John E. Andrews	Nominated	
Artios Awards	2014	Outstanding Achievement in Casting – Television Series – Drama	Mark Saks & John E. Andrews	Nominated	
Artios Awards	2015	Outstanding Achievement in Casting – Television Series – Drama	Mark Saks & John E. Andrews	Nominated	
BMI Film & TV Awards	2013	BMI TV Music Award	The Good Wife	Won	
British Academy Television Awards	2015	Best International	The Good Wife	Nominated	
British Academy Television Awards	2016	Best International	The Good Wife	Nominated	
Crime Thriller Awards	2010	Best International TV Drama	The Good Wife	Nominated	
Crime Thriller Awards	2012	Best Supporting Actor	Alan Cumming	Nominated	
Crime Thriller Awards	2012	Best Supporting Actress	Archie Panjabi	Nominated	
Critics' Choice Television Awards	2011	Best Drama Series	The Good Wife	Nominated	
Critics' Choice Television Awards	2011	Best Actress in a Drama Series	Julianna Margulies	Won	
Critics' Choice Television Awards	2011	Best Supporting Actor in a Drama Series	Alan Cumming	Nominated	
Critics' Choice Television Awards	2011	Best Supporting Actress in a Drama Series	Archie Panjabi	Nominated	
Critics' Choice Television Awards	2012	Best Drama Series	The Good Wife	Nominated	
Critics' Choice Television Awards	2012	Best Actress in a Drama Series	Julianna Margulies	Nominated	
Critics' Choice Television Awards	2012	Best Supporting Actress in a Drama Series	Christine Baranski	Nominated	
Critics' Choice Television Awards	2012	Best Guest Performer in a Drama Series	Carrie Preston	Nominated	
Critics' Choice Television Awards	2013	Best Drama Series	The Good Wife	Nominated	
Critics' Choice Television Awards	2013	Best Actress in a Drama Series	Julianna Margulies	Nominated	
Critics' Choice Television Awards	2013	Best Guest Performer in a Drama Series	Martha Plimpton	Nominated	
Critics' Choice Television Awards	2013	Best Guest Performer in a Drama Series	Carrie Preston	Nominated	
Critics' Choice Television Awards	2014	Best Drama Series	The Good Wife	Nominated	
Critics' Choice Television Awards	2014	Best Actress in a Drama Series	Julianna Margulies	Nominated	
Critics' Choice Television Awards	2014	Best Supporting Actor in a Drama Series	Josh Charles	Nominated	
Critics' Choice Television Awards	2014	Best Supporting Actress in a Drama Series	Christine Baranski	Nominated	
Critics' Choice Television Awards	2014	Best Guest Performer in a Drama Series	Carrie Preston	Nominated	
Critics' Choice Television Awards	2015	Best Drama Series	The Good Wife	Nominated	
Critics' Choice Television Awards	2015	Best Actress in a Drama Series	Julianna Margulies	Nominated	
Critics' Choice Television Awards	2015	Best Supporting Actress in a Drama Series	Christine Baranski	Nominated	
Critics' Choice Television Awards	2015	Best Guest Performer in a Drama Series	Linda Lavin	Nominated	
Critics' Choice Television Awards	2016	Best Guest Performer in a Drama Series	Margo Martindale	Won	
Dorian Awards	2011	TV Drama of the Year	The Good Wife	Won	
Dorian Awards	2011	TV Drama Performance of the Year	Julianna Margulies	Nominated	
Dorian Awards	2012	TV Drama of the Year	The Good Wife	Nominated	
Dorian Awards	2015	TV Drama of the Year	The Good Wife	Nominated	
Dorian Awards	2015	TV Performance of the Year - Actress	Julianna Margulies	Nominated	
Environmental Media Awards	2011	Television Episodic Drama	"The Real Deal"	Nominated	
Golden Globe Awards	2009	Best Actress in a Television Series – Drama	Julianna Margulies	Won	
Golden Globe Awards	2010	Best Television Series – Drama	The Good Wife	Nominated	
Golden Globe Awards	2010	Best Actress in a Television Series – Drama	Julianna Margulies	Nominated	
Golden Globe Awards	2010	Best Supporting Actor – Series, Miniseries or TV Film	Chris Noth	Nominated	
Golden Globe Awards	2011	Best Actress in a Television Series – Drama	Julianna Margulies	Nominated	
Golden Globe Awards	2012	Best Actress in a Television Series – Drama	Julianna Margulies	Nominated	
Golden Globe Awards	2012	Best Supporting Actress – Series, Mini-series or TV Film	Archie Panjabi	Nominated	
Golden Globe Awards	2013	Best Television Series – Drama	The Good Wife	Nominated	
Golden Globe Awards	2013	Best Actress in a Television Series – Drama	Julianna Margulies	Nominated	
Golden Globe Awards	2013	Best Supporting Actor – Series, Miniseries or TV Film	Josh Charles	Nominated	
Golden Globe Awards	2014	Best Television Series – Drama	The Good Wife	Nominated	
Golden Globe Awards	2014	Best Actress in a Television Series – Drama	Julianna Margulies	Nominated	
Golden Globe Awards	2014	Best Supporting Actor – Series, Miniseries, or TV Film	Alan Cumming	Nominated	
Golden Globe Awards	2015	Best Supporting Actor – Series, Miniseries, or TV Film	Alan Cumming	Nominated	
Golden Nymph Awards	2012	Outstanding International Producer (Drama Series)	Brooke Kennedy, Michelle King, Robert King, David W. Zucker	Nominated	
Golden Nymph Awards	2012	Outstanding Actress in a Drama Series	Julianna Margulies	Nominated	
Golden Nymph Awards	2012	Outstanding Actor in a Drama Series	Josh Charles	Nominated	
Golden Reel Awards	2014	Best Sound Editing – Short Form Music in Television	Sharyn Gersh (for "Death of a Client")	Nominated	
Humanitas Prize	2010	60 Minute Category	The Good Wife	Won	
NAACP Image Awards	2012	Outstanding Drama Series	The Good Wife	Nominated	
NAACP Image Awards	2012	Outstanding Supporting Actress in a Drama Series	Archie Panjabi	Won	
NAACP Image Awards	2013	Outstanding Supporting Actress in a Drama Series	Archie Panjabi	Nominated	
Peabody Award	2010	Honoree	Scott Free Productions, King Size Productions, Small Wishes, CBS Productions	Won	
People's Choice Awards	2011	Favorite Network TV Drama	The Good Wife	Nominated	
People's Choice Awards	2011	Favorite TV Drama Actress	Julianna Margulies	Nominated	
People's Choice Awards	2012	Favorite Network TV Drama	The Good Wife	Nominated	
People's Choice Awards	2012	Favorite TV Guest Star	Michael J. Fox	Nominated	
People's Choice Awards	2014	Favorite Network TV Drama	The Good Wife	Won	
People's Choice Awards	2014	Favorite TV Drama Actor	Josh Charles	Won	
People's Choice Awards	2014	Favorite TV Drama Actress	Julianna Margulies	Nominated	
Primetime Emmy Awards	2010	Outstanding Drama Series	The Good Wife	Nominated	
Primetime Emmy Awards	2010	Outstanding Lead Actress in a Drama Series	Julianna Margulies	Nominated	
Primetime Emmy Awards	2010	Outstanding Supporting Actress in a Drama Series	Christine Baranski	Nominated	
Primetime Emmy Awards	2010	Outstanding Supporting Actress in a Drama Series	Archie Panjabi	Won	
Primetime Emmy Awards	2010	Outstanding Writing for a Drama Series	Michelle King & Robert King (for "Pilot")	Nominated	
Primetime Emmy Awards	2011	Outstanding Drama Series	The Good Wife	Nominated	
Primetime Emmy Awards	2011	Outstanding Lead Actress in a Drama Series	Julianna Margulies	Won	
Primetime Emmy Awards	2011	Outstanding Supporting Actor in a Drama Series	Josh Charles	Nominated	
Primetime Emmy Awards	2011	Outstanding Supporting Actor in a Drama Series	Alan Cumming	Nominated	
Primetime Emmy Awards	2011	Outstanding Supporting Actress in a Drama Series	Christine Baranski	Nominated	
Primetime Emmy Awards	2011	Outstanding Supporting Actress in a Drama Series	Archie Panjabi	Nominated	
Primetime Emmy Awards	2012	Outstanding Lead Actress in a Drama Series	Julianna Margulies	Nominated	
Primetime Emmy Awards	2012	Outstanding Supporting Actress in a Drama Series	Christine Baranski	Nominated	
Primetime Emmy Awards	2012	Outstanding Supporting Actress in a Drama Series	Archie Panjabi	Nominated	
Primetime Emmy Awards	2013	Outstanding Supporting Actress in a Drama Series	Christine Baranski	Nominated	
Primetime Emmy Awards	2014	Outstanding Lead Actress in a Drama Series	Julianna Margulies	Won	
Primetime Emmy Awards	2014	Outstanding Supporting Actor in a Drama Series	Josh Charles	Nominated	
Primetime Emmy Awards	2014	Outstanding Supporting Actress in a Drama Series	Christine Baranski	Nominated	
Primetime Emmy Awards	2015	Outstanding Supporting Actor in a Drama Series	Alan Cumming	Nominated	
Primetime Emmy Awards	2015	Outstanding Supporting Actress in a Drama Series	Christine Baranski	Nominated	
Primetime Emmy Awards	2016	Outstanding Writing for a Drama Series	Michelle King & Robert King (for "End")	Nominated	
Primetime Creative Arts Emmy Awards	2010	Outstanding Casting for a Drama Series	Mark Saks	Nominated	
Primetime Creative Arts Emmy Awards	2010	Outstanding Costumes for a Series	Jennifer Rogien Faletti, Daniele Hollywood & Daniel Lawson (for "Smash")	Nominated	
Primetime Creative Arts Emmy Awards	2010	Outstanding Guest Actor in a Drama Series	Dylan Baker (for "Bad")	Nominated	
Primetime Creative Arts Emmy Awards	2010	Outstanding Guest Actor in a Drama Series	Alan Cumming (for "Fleas")	Nominated	
Primetime Creative Arts Emmy Awards	2011	Outstanding Guest Actor in a Drama Series	Michael J. Fox (for "Real Deal")	Nominated	
Primetime Creative Arts Emmy Awards	2011	Outstanding Casting for a Drama Series	Mark Saks	Nominated	
Primetime Creative Arts Emmy Awards	2011	Outstanding Cinematography for a Single-Camera Series	Fred Murphy (for "Double Jeopardy")	Nominated	
Primetime Creative Arts Emmy Awards	2012	Outstanding Guest Actor in a Drama Series	Dylan Baker (for "Marthas and Caitlins")	Nominated	
Primetime Creative Arts Emmy Awards	2012	Outstanding Guest Actor in a Drama Series	Michael J. Fox (for "Parenting Made Easy")	Nominated	
Primetime Creative Arts Emmy Awards	2012	Outstanding Guest Actress in a Drama Series	Martha Plimpton (for "The Dream Team")	Won	
Primetime Creative Arts Emmy Awards	2012	Outstanding Casting for a Drama Series	Mark Saks	Nominated	
Primetime Creative Arts Emmy Awards	2013	Outstanding Guest Actor in a Drama Series	Michael J. Fox (for "Boom De Yah Da")	Nominated	
Primetime Creative Arts Emmy Awards	2013	Outstanding Guest Actor in a Drama Series	Nathan Lane (for "I Fought the Law")	Nominated	
Primetime Creative Arts Emmy Awards	2013	Outstanding Guest Actress in a Drama Series	Carrie Preston (for "Je Ne Sais What?")	Won	
Primetime Creative Arts Emmy Awards	2013	Outstanding Casting for a Drama Series	Mark Saks	Nominated	
Primetime Creative Arts Emmy Awards	2014	Outstanding Guest Actor in a Drama Series	Dylan Baker (for "Tying the Knot")	Nominated	
Primetime Creative Arts Emmy Awards	2014	Outstanding Casting for a Drama Series	Mark Saks	Nominated	
Primetime Creative Arts Emmy Awards	2015	Outstanding Guest Actor in a Drama Series	Michael J. Fox (for "Red Zone")	Nominated	
Primetime Creative Arts Emmy Awards	2015	Outstanding Cinematography for a Single-Camera Series	Fred Murphy (for "The Line")	Nominated	
Primetime Creative Arts Emmy Awards	2016	Outstanding Guest Actor in a Drama Series	Michael J. Fox (for "Taxed")	Nominated	
Primetime Creative Arts Emmy Awards	2016	Outstanding Guest Actress in a Drama Series	Carrie Preston (for "Targets")	Nominated	
Primetime Creative Arts Emmy Awards	2016	Outstanding Costumes for a Contemporary Series, Limited Series or Movie	David Brooks, Daniele Hollywood, Angel Peart & Daniel Lawson (for "End")	Nominated	
Prism Awards	2012	Drama Series Episode – Substance Use	The Good Wife	Nominated	
Producers Guild of America Awards	2011	Outstanding Producer of Episodic Television, Drama	Brooke Kennedy, Michelle King, Robert King, Ridley Scott, Tony Scott, David W. Zucker	Nominated	
Satellite Awards	2009	Best Television Series – Drama	The Good Wife	Nominated	
Satellite Awards	2009	Best Actress in a Television Series – Drama	Julianna Margulies	Nominated	
Satellite Awards	2010	Best Television Series – Drama	The Good Wife	Nominated	
Satellite Awards	2010	Best Actor in a Television Series – Drama	Josh Charles	Nominated	
Satellite Awards	2010	Best Actress in a Television Series – Drama	Julianna Margulies	Nominated	
Satellite Awards	2010	Best Supporting Actor – Series, Miniseries or TV Film	Alan Cumming	Nominated	
Satellite Awards	2010	Best Supporting Actress – Series, Miniseries or TV Film	Archie Panjabi	Nominated	
Satellite Awards	2011	Best Actress in a Television Series – Drama	Julianna Margulies	Nominated	
Satellite Awards	2012	Best Television Series – Drama	The Good Wife	Nominated	
Satellite Awards	2012	Best Actress in a Television Series – Drama	Julianna Margulies	Nominated	
Satellite Awards	2013	Best Television Series – Drama	The Good Wife	Nominated	
Satellite Awards	2014	Best Actress in a Television Series – Drama	Julianna Margulies	Nominated	
Screen Actors Guild Awards	2009	Outstanding Performance by a Female Actor in a Drama Series	Julianna Margulies	Won	
Screen Actors Guild Awards	2009	Outstanding Performance by an Ensemble in a Drama Series	Christine Baranski, Josh Charles, Matt Czuchry, Julianna Margulies, Archie Panjabi, Graham Phillips, Makenzie Vega	Nominated	
Screen Actors Guild Awards	2010	Outstanding Performance by a Female Actor in a Drama Series	Julianna Margulies	Won	
Screen Actors Guild Awards	2010	Outstanding Performance by an Ensemble in a Drama Series	Christine Baranski, Josh Charles, Alan Cumming, Matt Czuchry, Julianna Margulies, Archie Panjabi, Graham Phillips, Makenzie Vega	Nominated	
Screen Actors Guild Awards	2011	Outstanding Performance by a Female Actor in a Drama Series	Julianna Margulies	Nominated	
Screen Actors Guild Awards	2011	Outstanding Performance by an Ensemble in a Drama Series	Christine Baranski, Josh Charles, Alan Cumming, Matt Czuchry, Julianna Margulies, Archie Panjabi, Graham Phillips, Makenzie Vega	Nominated	
Screen Actors Guild Awards	2012	Outstanding Performance by a Female Actor in a Drama Series	Julianna Margulies	Nominated	
Screen Actors Guild Awards	2014	Outstanding Performance by a Female Actor in a Drama Series	Julianna Margulies	Nominated	
Screen Actors Guild Awards	2015	Outstanding Performance by a Female Actor in a Drama Series	Julianna Margulies	Nominated	
TCA Awards	2010	Outstanding Achievement in Drama	The Good Wife	Nominated	
TCA Awards	2010	Outstanding New Program	The Good Wife	Nominated	
TCA Awards	2010	Individual Achievement in Drama	Julianna Margulies	Won	
TCA Awards	2011	Outstanding Achievement in Drama	The Good Wife	Nominated	
TCA Awards	2011	Individual Achievement in Drama	Julianna Margulies	Nominated	
TCA Awards	2014	Program of the Year	The Good Wife	Nominated	
TCA Awards	2014	Outstanding Achievement in Drama	The Good Wife	Won	
TCA Awards	2014	Individual Achievement in Drama	Julianna Margulies	Nominated	
TV Guide Awards	2012	Favorite Actress	Julianna Margulies	Nominated	
TV Guide Awards	2012	Favorite Drama Series	The Good Wife	Nominated	
TV Guide Awards	2012	Favorite Ensemble	The Good Wife	Nominated	
TV Guide Awards	2013	Favorite Actress	Julianna Margulies	Nominated	
TV Guide Awards	2013	Favorite Drama Series	The Good Wife	Nominated	
TV Guide Awards	2014	Favorite Actress	Julianna Margulies	Nominated	
TV Guide Awards	2014	Favorite Drama Series	The Good Wife	Nominated	
Women's Image Network Awards	2011	Actress Drama Series	Julianna Margulies (for "In Sickness")	Nominated	
Writers Guild of America Awards	2009	Television: New Series	Angela Amato Velez, Corinne Brinkerhoff, Ted Humphrey, Dee Johnson, Todd Ellis Kessler, Michelle King, Robert King	Nominated	
Writers Guild of America Awards	2010	Television: Episodic Drama	Ted Humphrey (for "Boom")	Nominated	
Writers Guild of America Awards	2011	Television: Dramatic Series	Courtney Kemp Agboh, Meredith Averill, Corinne Brinkerhoff, Leonard Dick, Keith Eisner, Karen Hall, Ted Humphrey, Michelle King, Robert King, Steve Lichtman, Matthew Montoya, Julia Wolfe	Nominated	
Writers Guild of America Awards	2013	Television: Dramatic Series	Meredith Averill, Leonard Dick, Keith Eisner, Jacqueline Hoyt, Ted Humphrey, Michelle King, Robert King, Erica Shelton Kodish, Matthew Montoya, J.C. Nolan, Luke Schelhaas, Nichelle Tramble Spellman, Craig Turk, Julie Wolfe	Nominated	
Writers Guild of America Awards	2013	Television: Episodic Drama	Michelle & Robert King (for "Hitting the Fan")	Nominated	
Writers Guild of America Awards	2014	Television: Dramatic Series	Leonard Dick, Keith Eisner, Matthew Hodgson, Ted Humphrey, Michelle King, Robert King, Erica Shelton Kodish, Matthew Montoya, Luke Schelhaas, Nichelle Tramble Spellman, Craig Turk, Julia Wolfe	Nominated	
Writers Guild of America Awards	2014	Television: Episodic Drama	Michelle & Robert King (for "The Last Call")	Won	
Young Artist Awards	2010	Best Performance in a TV Series - Recurring Young Actress	Makenzie Vega	Nominated	
Young Artist Awards	2011	Best Performance in a TV Series (Comedy or Drama) - Supporting Young Actress	Makenzie Vega	Nominated	
Young Artist Awards	2011	Best Performance in a TV Series (Comedy or Drama) - Supporting Young Actor	Graham Phillips	Nominated	
