= The Subject (2020 film) =

- Film poster
- Directed by: Lanie Zipoy
- Written by: Chisa Hutchinson
- Produced by: Gahlia Eden; Megan Kingery; Lanie Zipoy
- Starring: Jason Biggs; Anabelle Acosta; Nile Bullock; Caleb Eberhardt; Aunjanue Ellis; Carra Patterson; Brian McManamon
- Cinematography: Darren Joe
- Edited by: Sofi Marshall
- Music by: Doug Wamble
- Production company: Prochaine Films
- Distributed by: Gravitas Ventures
- Release dates: 11 June 2020 (Art of Brooklyn Film Festival); 22 October 2021 (US)
- Running time: 119 minutes
- Country: United States
- Languages: English; Spanish

The Subject is a 2020 American drama film directed by Lanie Zipoy and starring Jason Biggs, Anabelle Acosta, Nile Bullock, Caleb Eberhardt, Aunjanue Ellis, Carra Patterson and Brian McManamon. The film follows Phil Waterhouse (Biggs), a white documentary filmmaker who receives public backlash due to a film of his featuring the on-screen death of a black teen.

== Cast ==
- Jason Biggs as Phil Waterhouse
- Anabelle Acosta as Jess Rivas
- Nile Bullock as Malcolm Barnes
- Caleb Eberhardt as Kwame Johnson
- Aunjanue Ellis as Leslie Barnes
- Carra Patterson as Marley Reed
- Brian McManamon as Peter

== Release ==
The film was released in theatres and on TVOD on 22 October 2021.

== Reception ==
On review aggregation website Rotten Tomatoes, The Subject holds an approval rating of 67% based on 6 reviews, with an average rating of 6.00/10.

Monique Jones of Common Sense Media rated the film 4 stars out of 5 and called it "intense", "engaging" and "mature." Lovia Gyarkye of The Hollywood Reporter called the film a "fascinating conceit" which "struggles to deliver."

Sarah Bea Milner of Screen Rant rated the film 2 stars out of 5 and wrote that while the film is "full of promise", it is "ultimately disappointing."
