= The Arrangement (2017 TV series) =

- Genre: Drama
- Created by: Jonathan Abrahams
- Starring: Josh Henderson; Christine Evangelista; Lexa Doig; Carra Patterson; Michael Vartan
- Composer: James Iha
- Country of origin: United States
- Original language: English
- No. of seasons: 2
- No. of episodes: 20

Production
- Producer: Peter Lhotka
- Cinematography: Itai Ne'eman; Matthew Clark
- Camera setup: Single-camera
- Running time: 43 minutes
- Production companies: Sneaky Pictures, Inc.; All3Media; Main Event Media; Universal Cable Productions

Original release
- Network: E!
- Release: March 5, 2017 – May 13, 2018

The Arrangement is an American drama television series created by Jonathan Abrahams that aired on E!. A trailer was released on May 16, 2016. The series premiered on March 5, 2017. On April 13, 2017, E! announced that it had renewed the series for a 10-episode second season, which premiered on March 11, 2018.

On May 29, 2018, the series was canceled after two seasons.

== Premise ==
Megan Morrison, a young actress, auditions to play the female lead in a high-profile film opposite action star Kyle West. She meets Terence Anderson, the leader of the Institute of the Higher Mind, a self-help organization. Anderson offers her the title "arrangement" – a contract offering her $10 million if she marries West.

The show centers around the Hollywood actor and actress's relationship, and is an "'amalgam' of stories inside Hollywood about arranged relationships against the backdrop of self-help programs". Some reviews suggest it was inspired by Scientology and the relationship between Tom Cruise and Katie Holmes.

== Cast and characters ==
=== Main ===
- Christine Evangelista as Megan Morrison West, an unknown actress who, after a successful audition, is plucked from obscurity and offered a secret contract to be the fiancée to Kyle West, one of Hollywood's biggest stars
- Josh Henderson as Kyle West, one of the hottest actors in Hollywood, and the most prominent public face of the Institute of the Higher Mind (IHM)
- Lexa Doig as DeAnn Anderson, Terrence's wife, a successful Hollywood producer, and a high-ranking member of IHM
- Carra Patterson as Shaun, Megan's best friend, who later gets involved with IHM as a lawyer
- Michael Vartan as Terence Anderson, Kyle's producing partner and the leader of the Institute of the Higher Mind

=== Recurring ===
- Autumn Reeser as Leslie Bellcamp, Megan's original agent
- Katharine Isabelle as Hope, Megan's old friend
- Ashley Grace as Lisbeth, Kyle's ex-fiancée
- Courtney Paige as Annika (season 1)
- Kyle Toy as Zach, Kyle's personal assistant
- Ruffin Prentiss as Xavier Hughes, a popular musician who Kyle chooses to co-star in his film Technicolor Highway
- Jacob Artist as Wes Blaker, the son of an old friend of DeAnn's who is interested in an acting career (season 2)

== Episodes ==
=== Series overview ===
Season	Episodes	Originally released	
Season	Episodes	First released	Last released
1	10	March 5, 2017	May 7, 2017
2	10	March 11, 2018	May 13, 2018

=== Season 1 (2017) ===
No. overall	No. in season	Title	Directed by	Written by	Original release date	U.S. viewers (millions)
1	1	"Pilot"	Ken Olin	Jonathan Abrahams	March 5, 2017	0.848
2	2	"The Ex"	Jonas Pate	Jonathan Abrahams	March 12, 2017	0.714
3	3	"The Leak"	Elizabeth Allen Rosenbaum	Jonathan Abrahams	March 19, 2017	0.799
4	4	"Crashing"	Elizabeth Allen Rosenbaum	Patricia Resnick	March 26, 2017	0.645
5	5	"Temptation"	Carol Banker	Rob Bragin	April 2, 2017	0.570
6	6	"Control"	Carol Banker	Leah Benavides	April 9, 2017	0.608
7	7	"Trips"	Lukas Ettlin	Mel Cowan	April 16, 2017	0.595
8	8	"The Betrayal"	Lukas Ettlin	Olivia Briggs	April 23, 2017	0.573
9	9	"Sins"	Jonas Pate	Rob Bragin	April 30, 2017	0.736
10	10	"The New Narrative"	Jonas Pate	Jonathan Abrahams	May 7, 2017	0.560

=== Season 2 (2018) ===
No. overall	No. in season	Title	Directed by	Written by	Original release date	U.S. viewers (millions)
11	1	"The Long Game"	Robert Duncan McNeill	Jonathan Abrahams	March 11, 2018	0.467
12	2	"Surface Tension"	Michael Goi	Mel Cowan	March 18, 2018	0.477
13	3	"The Sessions"	Norman Buckley	Adam Milch	March 25, 2018	0.418
14	4	"Scene 23"	Alexis Ostrander	Leah Benavides	April 1, 2018	0.412
15	5	"You Are Not Alone"	Tanya Wexler	Roger Grant	April 8, 2018	0.399
16	6	"The Break Up"	Robert Duncan McNeill	Olivia Briggs	April 15, 2018	0.361
17	7	"On Location"	Robert Duncan McNeill	Leah Benavides & Mel Cowan	April 22, 2018	0.390
18	8	"Paso Robles"	Janice Cooke	Roger Grant	April 29, 2018	0.401
19	9	"Truth"	Jonathan Frakes	Adam Milch	May 6, 2018	0.421
20	10	"Suite Revenge"	Robert Duncan McNeill	Jonathan Abrahams	May 13, 2018	0.432
