= Carra Patterson =

American actress

- Born: St. Petersburg, Florida, U.S.
- Occupation: Actress
- Years active: 2008–present
- Children: 3

Carra Patterson is an American actress.

== Life and career ==
Patterson was born and raised in St. Petersburg, Florida. Her mother was 16 when she was born. She graduated from the New York University Tisch School of the Arts and later began appearing in off-Broadway productions. She made her big screen debut appearing in a supporting role in the 2010 romantic comedy-drama film, Why Did I Get Married Too?. In 2012 she made her Broadway debut in Manhattan Theatre Club production of Wit starring Cynthia Nixon. She later performed in off-Broadway productions of Luck of the Irish, Significant Other and By the Way, Meet Vera Stark. In 2017 she starred in August Wilson's play Jitney.

In 2015, Patterson appeared in the biographical drama film Straight Outta Compton directed by F. Gary Gray. On television, she made guest appearances on The Good Wife, Blue Bloods, Elementary and Instinct. From 2017 to 2018 she was a regular cast member in the E! drama series, The Arrangement. In 2020 she played Josephine Baker in an episode of HBO series, Lovecraft Country. In 2021, Patterson starred in the Disney+ action comedy series, Turner & Hooch. The series was canceled after one season. In 2023, Patterson played civil rights leader Coretta Scott King in the biographical drama film, Rustin directed by George C. Wolfe.

Later in 2023 she was cast opposite Carrie Preston in the CBS comedy-drama series, Elsbeth. Following end of the second season, Preston announced that Patterson would be leaving the show as a series regular and would guest star in the third season.

== Filmography ==
=== Film ===
Year	Title	Role	Notes
2010	Why Did I Get Married Too?	Kelly	
2013	Out There	Kim	Short film
2015	Straight Outta Compton	Tomica Wright	
2016	How to Tell You're a Douchebag	Grace	
2017	Ambition's Debt	Calpurnia	
2020	The Subject	Marley Reed	
2020	A Storybook Ending	Claudia	Short film
2021	The Snakes	Erica	Short film
2023	Rustin	Coretta Scott King	

=== Television ===
Year	Title	Role	Notes
2014	The Good Wife	Bartender	Episode: "We, the Juries"
2014	Blue Bloods	Officer Dolores Munoz	Episode: "Under the Gun"
2015	Elementary	Jessa	Episode: "The Eternity Injection"
2016	Bloodline	Assistant	Episode: "Part 14"
2017–2018	The Arrangement	Shaun	20 episodes
2019	Instinct	Amber	Episode: "One-of-a-Kind"
2019	Prodigal Son	Tally	Episode: "Pied-A-Terre"
2020	Lovecraft Country	Josephine Baker	Episode: "I Am."
2021	Turner & Hooch	Jessica Baxter	12 episodes
2023	Servant	Suzy	Episodes: "Boo" and "Neighbors"
2024–present	Elsbeth	Kaya Blanke	Series regular, seasons 1-2, recurring seasons 3-present
