= Mark Saks =

Mark Saks is an American casting director known for his work in theatre and for television dramas. He is a five-time Emmy Award nominee.

== Early life and education ==
Saks grew up in the New York suburbs and in Los Angeles; he described his parents as "avid theatregoers." Saks attended and taught at Stagedoor Manor, a summer camp for performing arts.

== Career ==
Saks formed Mark Saks Casting, based in New York. Saks was the casting director for the TV drama The Good Wife. Actor Josh Charles knew Saks from Stagedoor Manor decades before being cast in the show. Saks was nominated for five Emmy Awards for Outstanding Casting for a Drama Series.

Saks also led casting for Prodigal Son.

Saks previously held executive positions at Warner Bros. Television, CBS Television Studios and Sony Pictures Television. As senior vice president for talent and casting at Sony Pictures, he supervised casting for The Guardian, Strong Medicine, Dawson's Creek, and Joan of Arcadia.
