= List of ER episodes =

ER is an American medical drama television series created by Michael Crichton that premiered on NBC on September 19, 1994. It was produced by Constant c Productions and Amblin Television, in association with Warner Bros. Television. The series follows the inner life of the emergency room (ER) of fictional Cook County General Hospital in Chicago, and various critical issues faced by the room's physicians and staff. Over the course of the series, 331 episodes of ER aired over 15 seasons, between September 19, 1994, and April 2, 2009.

== Series overview ==
Season	Episodes	Originally released		Rank	Rating	Viewers (millions)
Season	Episodes	First released	Last released	Rank	Rating	Viewers (millions)
1	25	September 19, 1994	May 18, 1995	2	20.0	30.1
2	22	September 21, 1995	May 16, 1996	1	22.0	35.7
3	22	September 26, 1996	May 15, 1997	1	21.2	33.9
4	22	September 25, 1997	May 14, 1998	2	20.4	33.3
5	22	September 24, 1998	May 20, 1999	1	17.8	29.6
6	22	September 30, 1999	May 18, 2000	4	16.9	29.8
7	22	October 12, 2000	May 17, 2001	2	15.0	27.0
8	22	September 27, 2001	May 16, 2002	3	14.2	26.1
9	22	September 26, 2002	May 15, 2003	6	13.1	22.7
10	22	September 25, 2003	May 13, 2004	8	12.9	21.5
11	22	September 23, 2004	May 19, 2005	16	10.4	17.5
12	22	September 22, 2005	May 18, 2006	30	8.1	14.2
13	23	September 21, 2006	May 17, 2007	40	7.4	12.0
14	19	September 27, 2007	May 15, 2008	54	3.2	8.7
15	22	September 25, 2008	April 2, 2009	37	6.7	9.0

== Episodes ==
=== Season 1 (1994–1995) ===
No. overall	No. in season	Title	Directed by	Written by	Original release date	Prod. code	US viewers (millions)
1	1	"24 Hours"	Rod Holcomb	Michael Crichton	September 19, 1994	475079	23.8
2	2	"Day One"	Mimi Leder	John Wells	September 22, 1994	456601	23.0
3	3	"Going Home"	Mark Tinker	Lydia Woodward	September 29, 1994	456602	23.9
4	4	"Hit and Run"	Mimi Leder	Paul Manning	October 6, 1994	456604	26.8
5	5	"Into That Good Night"	Charles Haid	Robert Nathan	October 13, 1994	456603	26.7
6	6	"Chicago Heat"	Elodie Keene	Story by : Neal Baer; Teleplay by : John Wells	October 20, 1994	456605	27.3
7	7	"Another Perfect Day"	Vern Gillum	Story by : Lance Gentile; Teleplay by : Lydia Woodward	November 3, 1994	456606	25.7
8	8	"9½ Hours"	James Hayman	Robert Nathan	November 10, 1994	456607	28.3
9	9	"ER Confidential"	Daniel Sackheim	Paul Manning	November 17, 1994	456608	24.5
10	10	"Blizzard"	Mimi Leder	Story by : Neal Baer & Paul Manning; Teleplay by : Lance Gentile	December 8, 1994	456609	29.1
11	11	"The Gift"	Félix Enríquez Alcalá	Neal Baer	December 15, 1994	456610	27.8
12	12	"Happy New Year"	Charles Haid	Lydia Woodward	January 5, 1995	456611	30.4
13	13	"Luck of the Draw"	Rod Holcomb	Paul Manning	January 12, 1995	456612	31.2
14	14	"Long Day's Journey"	Anita Addison	Robert Nathan	January 19, 1995	456613	34.0
15	15	"Feb 5, '95"	James Hayman	John Wells	February 2, 1995	456614	34.0
16	16	"Make of Two Hearts"	Mimi Leder	Lydia Woodward	February 9, 1995	456615	34.2
17	17	"The Birthday Party"	Elodie Keene	John Wells	February 16, 1995	456616	32.7
18	18	"Sleepless in Chicago"	Christopher Chulack	Paul Manning	February 23, 1995	456617	35.0
19	19	"Love's Labor Lost"	Mimi Leder	Lance Gentile	March 9, 1995	456618	34.4
20	20	"Full Moon, Saturday Night"	Donna Deitch	Neal Baer	March 30, 1995	456619	32.9
21	21	"House of Cards"	Fred Gerber	Tracey Stern	April 6, 1995	456620	35.3
22	22	"Men Plan, God Laughs"	Christopher Chulack	Robert Nathan	April 27, 1995	456621	33.5
23	23	"Love Among the Ruins"	Fred Gerber	Paul Manning	May 4, 1995	456622	31.5
24	24	"Motherhood"	Quentin Tarantino	Lydia Woodward	May 11, 1995	456623	33.1
25	25	"Everything Old Is New Again"	Mimi Leder	John Wells	May 18, 1995	456624	33.6

=== Season 2 (1995–1996) ===
No. overall	No. in season	Title	Directed by	Written by	Original release date	Prod. code	US viewers (millions)
26	1	"Welcome Back, Carter!"	Mimi Leder	John Wells	September 21, 1995	457201	37.5
27	2	"Summer Run"	Eric Laneuville	Lydia Woodward	September 28, 1995	457202	33.7
28	3	"Do One, Teach One, Kill One"	Félix Enríquez Alcalá	Paul Manning	October 5, 1995	457203	35.6
29	4	"What Life?"	Dean Parisot	Carol Flint	October 12, 1995	457204	35.5
30	5	"And Baby Makes Two"	Lesli Linka Glatter	Anne Kenney	October 19, 1995	457205	35.3
31	6	"Days Like This"	Mimi Leder	Lydia Woodward	November 2, 1995	457206	35.3
32	7	"Hell and High Water"	Christopher Chulack	Neal Baer	November 9, 1995	457207	42.0
33	8	"The Secret Sharer"	Thomas Schlamme	Paul Manning	November 16, 1995	457208	39.4
34	9	"Home"	Donna Deitch	Tracey Stern	December 7, 1995	457209	35.0
35	10	"A Miracle Happens Here"	Mimi Leder	Carol Flint	December 14, 1995	457210	34.9
36	11	"Dead of Winter"	Whitney Ransick	John Wells	January 4, 1996	457211	37.6
37	12	"True Lies"	Lesli Linka Glatter	Lance Gentile	January 25, 1996	457212	34.6
38	13	"It's Not Easy Being Greene"	Christopher Chulack	Paul Manning	February 1, 1996	457213	35.9
39	14	"The Right Thing"	Richard Thorpe	Lydia Woodward	February 8, 1996	457214	38.1
40	15	"Baby Shower"	Barnet Kellman	Story by : Belinda Casas Wells & Carol Flint; Teleplay by : Carol Flint	February 15, 1996	457215	36.4
41	16	"The Healers"	Mimi Leder	John Wells	February 22, 1996	457216	36.0
42	17	"The Match Game"	Thomas Schlamme	Neal Baer	March 28, 1996	457217	36.0
43	18	"A Shift in the Night"	Lance Gentile	Joe Sachs	April 4, 1996	457218	33.2
44	19	"Fire in the Belly"	Félix Enríquez Alcalá	Paul Manning	April 25, 1996	457219	32.2
45	20	"Fevers of Unknown Origin"	Richard Thorpe	Carol Flint	May 2, 1996	457220	34.3
46	21	"Take These Broken Wings"	Anthony Edwards	Lydia Woodward	May 9, 1996	457221	32.0
47	22	"John Carter, M.D."	Christopher Chulack	John Wells	May 16, 1996	457222	34.3

=== Season 3 (1996–1997) ===
No. overall	No. in season	Title	Directed by	Written by	Original release date	Prod. code	US viewers (millions)	Rating/share (18–49)
48	1	"Dr. Carter, I Presume"	Christopher Chulack	John Wells	September 26, 1996	465401	34.89	18.7/47
49	2	"Let the Games Begin"	Tom Moore	Lydia Woodward	October 3, 1996	465402	30.49	16.6/42
50	3	"Don't Ask, Don't Tell"	Perry Lang	Story by : Paul Manning & Jason Cahill; Teleplay by : Jason Cahill	October 10, 1996	465403	29.99	16.3/43
51	4	"Last Call"	Rod Holcomb	Story by : Samantha Howard Corbin & Carol Flint; Teleplay by : Samantha Howard Corbin	October 17, 1996	465404	32.93	17.7/44
52	5	"Ghosts"	Richard Thorpe	Neal Baer	October 31, 1996	465405	31.13	16.7/46
53	6	"Fear of Flying"	Christopher Chulack	Lance Gentile	November 7, 1996	465406	36.68	19.2/49
54	7	"No Brain, No Gain"	David Nutter	Paul Manning	November 14, 1996	465407	37.41	20.1/50
55	8	"Union Station"	Tom Moore	Carol Flint	November 21, 1996	465408	37.03	19.3/49
56	9	"Ask Me No Questions, I'll Tell You No Lies"	Paris Barclay	Story by : Neal Baer & Lydia Woodward; Teleplay by : Barbara Hall	December 12, 1996	465409	32.89	17.8/47
57	10	"Homeless for the Holidays"	Davis Guggenheim	Samantha Howard Corbin	December 19, 1996	465410	34.27	18.1/46
58	11	"Night Shift"	Jonathan Kaplan	Paul Manning	January 16, 1997	465411	35.85	19.1/46
59	12	"Post-Mortem"	Jacque Elaine Toberen	Carol Flint	January 23, 1997	465412	35.09	18.7/47
60	13	"Fortune's Fools"	Michael Katleman	Jason Cahill	January 30, 1997	465413	33.64	17.8/46
61	14	"Whose Appy Now?"	Félix Enríquez Alcalá	Neal Baer	February 6, 1997	465414	33.29	18.0/46
62	15	"The Long Way Around"	Christopher Chulack	Lydia Woodward	February 13, 1997	465415	35.87	18.9/47
63	16	"Faith"	Jonathan Kaplan	John Wells	February 20, 1997	465416	33.20	17.6/46
64	17	"Tribes"	Richard Thorpe	Lance Gentile	April 10, 1997	465417	34.38	18.6/47
65	18	"You Bet Your Life"	Christopher Chulack	Paul Manning	April 17, 1997	465418	32.09	16.9/44
66	19	"Calling Dr. Hathaway"	Paris Barclay	Story by : Neal Baer; Teleplay by : Jason Cahill & Samantha Howard Corbin	April 24, 1997	465419	33.58	17.9/44
67	20	"Random Acts"	Jonathan Kaplan	Carol Flint	May 1, 1997	465420	31.54	17.0/40
68	21	"Make a Wish"	Richard Thorpe	Story by : Joe Sachs; Teleplay by : Lydia Woodward	May 8, 1997	465421	34.82	18.8/45
69	22	"One More for the Road"	Christopher Chulack	John Wells	May 15, 1997	465422	34.94	N/A

=== Season 4 (1997–1998) ===
No. overall	No. in season	Title	Directed by	Written by	Original release date	Prod. code	US viewers (millions)
70	1	"Ambush"	Thomas Schlamme	Carol Flint	September 25, 1997	466356	42.71
71	2	"Something New"	Christopher Chulack	Lydia Woodward	October 2, 1997	466351	32.57
72	3	"Friendly Fire"	Félix Enríquez Alcalá	Walon Green	October 9, 1997	466352	32.13
73	4	"When the Bough Breaks"	Richard Thorpe	Jack Orman	October 16, 1997	466353	32.79
74	5	"Good Touch, Bad Touch"	Jonathan Kaplan	David Mills	October 30, 1997	466354	29.24
75	6	"Ground Zero"	Darnell Martin	Samantha Howard Corbin	November 6, 1997	466355	31.95
76	7	"Fathers and Sons"	Christopher Chulack	John Wells	November 13, 1997	466357	34.65
77	8	"Freak Show"	Darnell Martin	Neal Baer	November 20, 1997	466358	33.43
78	9	"Obstruction of Justice"	Richard Thorpe	Lance Gentile	December 11, 1997	466359	31.66
79	10	"Do You See What I See?"	Sarah Pia Anderson	Story by : Linda Gase; Teleplay by : Jack Orman	December 18, 1997	466360	32.45
80	11	"Think Warm Thoughts"	Charles Haid	David Mills	January 8, 1998	466361	32.23
81	12	"Sharp Relief"	Christopher Chulack	Samantha Howard Corbin	January 15, 1998	466362	34.41
82	13	"Carter's Choice"	John Wells	John Wells	January 29, 1998	466363	32.84
83	14	"Family Practice"	Charles Haid	Carol Flint	February 5, 1998	466364	31.89
84	15	"Exodus"	Christopher Chulack	Walon Green & Joe Sachs	February 26, 1998	466365	32.82
85	16	"My Brother's Keeper"	Jaque Toberen	Jack Orman	March 5, 1998	466366	30.36
86	17	"A Bloody Mess"	Richard Thorpe	Linda Gase	April 9, 1998	466367	30.91
87	18	"Gut Reaction"	T.R. Babu Subramaniam	Neal Baer	April 16, 1998	466368	30.33
88	19	"Shades of Gray"	Lance Gentile	Samantha Howard Corbin	April 23, 1998	466369	32.44
89	20	"Of Past Regret and Future Fear"	Anthony Edwards	Jack Orman	April 30, 1998	466370	30.21
90	21	"Suffer the Little Children"	Christopher Misiano	Walon Green	May 7, 1998	466371	33.80
91	22	"A Hole in the Heart"	Lesli Linka Glatter	Lydia Woodward	May 14, 1998	466372	47.78

=== Season 5 (1998–1999) ===
No. overall	No. in season	Title	Directed by	Written by	Original release date	Prod. code	US viewers (millions)
92	1	"Day for Knight"	Christopher Chulack	Lydia Woodward	September 24, 1998	467551	31.86
93	2	"Split Second"	Christopher Misiano	Carol Flint	October 1, 1998	467552	30.63
94	3	"They Treat Horses, Don't They?"	T.R. Babu Subramaniam	Walon Green	October 8, 1998	467553	29.34
95	4	"Vanishing Act"	Lesli Linka Glatter	Jack Orman	October 15, 1998	467554	27.87
96	5	"Masquerade"	Steve De Jarnatt	Story by : Joe Sachs & Samantha Howard Corbin; Teleplay by : Samantha Howard Corbin	October 29, 1998	467555	29.14
97	6	"Stuck on You"	David Nutter	Story by : Neal Baer & Linda Gase; Teleplay by : Neal Baer	November 5, 1998	467556	28.61
98	7	"Hazed and Confused"	Jonathan Kaplan	Story by : David Mills & Carol Flint; Teleplay by : David Mills	November 12, 1998	467557	28.97
99	8	"The Good Fight"	Christopher Chulack	Jack Orman	November 19, 1998	467558	29.00
100	9	"Good Luck, Ruth Johnson"	Rod Holcomb	Lydia Woodward	December 10, 1998	467559	29.97
101	10	"The Miracle Worker"	Lesli Linka Glatter	Paul Manning	December 17, 1998	467560	29.87
102	11	"Nobody Doesn't Like Amanda Lee"	Richard Thorpe	Linda Gase	January 7, 1999	467561	31.60
103	12	"Double Blind"	Dave Chameides	Carol Flint	January 21, 1999	467562	30.48
104	13	"Choosing Joi"	Christopher Chulack	Lydia Woodward	February 4, 1999	467563	29.11
105	14	"The Storm: Part I"	John Wells	John Wells	February 11, 1999	467564	31.92
106	15	"The Storm: Part II"	Christopher Chulack	John Wells	February 18, 1999	467565	35.70
107	16	"Middle of Nowhere"	Jonathan Kaplan	Carol Flint & Neal Baer	February 25, 1999	467566	30.26
108	17	"Sticks and Stones"	Félix Enríquez Alcalá	Joe Sachs	March 25, 1999	467567	26.36
109	18	"Point of Origin"	Christopher Misiano	Christopher Mack	April 8, 1999	467568	26.10
110	19	"Rites of Spring"	Jonathan Kaplan	David Mills	April 29, 1999	467569	26.56
111	20	"Power"	Laura Innes	Carol Flint	May 6, 1999	467570	27.40
112	21	"Responsible Parties"	Christopher Chulack	Jack Orman	May 13, 1999	467571	27.53
113	22	"Getting to Know You"	Jonathan Kaplan	Lydia Woodward	May 20, 1999	467572	32.60

=== Season 6 (1999–2000) ===
No. overall	No. in season	Title	Directed by	Written by	Original release date	Prod. code	US viewers (millions)
114	1	"Leave It to Weaver"	Jonathan Kaplan	Lydia Woodward	September 30, 1999	225451	31.53
115	2	"Last Rites"	Félix Enríquez Alcalá	Jack Orman	October 7, 1999	225452	28.20
116	3	"Greene with Envy"	Peter Markle	Patrick Harbinson	October 14, 1999	225453	30.45
117	4	"Sins of the Fathers"	Ken Kwapis	Doug Palau	October 21, 1999	225454	29.56
118	5	"Truth & Consequences"	Steve De Jarnatt	R. Scott Gemmill	November 4, 1999	225455	28.61
119	6	"The Peace of Wild Things"	Richard Thorpe	John Wells	November 11, 1999	225456	28.51
120	7	"Humpty Dumpty"	Jonathan Kaplan	Neal Baer	November 18, 1999	225457	28.77
121	8	"Great Expectations"	Christopher Misiano	Jack Orman	November 25, 1999	225458	30.80
122	9	"How the Finch Stole Christmas"	Fred Einesman	Linda Gase	December 16, 1999	225459	29.10
123	10	"Family Matters"	Anthony Edwards	Patrick Harbinson	January 6, 2000	225460	28.69
124	11	"The Domino Heart"	Lesli Linka Glatter	Joe Sachs	January 13, 2000	225461	28.42
125	12	"Abby Road"	Richard Thorpe	R. Scott Gemmill	February 3, 2000	225462	27.88
126	13	"Be Still My Heart"	Laura Innes	Lydia Woodward	February 10, 2000	225463	31.33
127	14	"All in the Family"	Jonathan Kaplan	Jack Orman	February 17, 2000	225464	39.38
128	15	"Be Patient"	Ken Kwapis	Sandy Kroopf	February 24, 2000	225465	31.31
129	16	"Under Control"	Christopher Misiano	Neal Baer & Joe Sachs	March 23, 2000	225466	27.19
130	17	"Viable Options"	Marita Grabiak	Patrick Harbinson	April 6, 2000	225467	27.50
131	18	"Match Made in Heaven"	Jonathan Kaplan	R. Scott Gemmill	April 13, 2000	225468	26.01
132	19	"The Fastest Year"	Richard Thorpe	Lydia Woodward	April 27, 2000	225469	27.38
133	20	"Loose Ends"	Kevin Hooks	Neal Baer	May 4, 2000	225470	26.25
134	21	"Such Sweet Sorrow"	John Wells	John Wells	May 11, 2000	225471	32.67
135	22	"May Day"	Jonathan Kaplan	Jack Orman	May 18, 2000	225472	34.59

=== Season 7 (2000–2001) ===
No. overall	No. in season	Title	Directed by	Written by	Original release date	Prod. code	US viewers (millions)
136	1	"Homecoming"	Jonathan Kaplan	Jack Orman	October 12, 2000	226251	29.33
137	2	"Sand and Water"	Christopher Misiano	Jack Orman	October 19, 2000	226252	25.92
138	3	"Mars Attacks"	Paris Barclay	R. Scott Gemmill	October 26, 2000	226253	26.09
139	4	"Benton Backwards"	Richard Thorpe	Dee Johnson	November 2, 2000	226254	27.81
140	5	"Flight of Fancy"	Lesli Linka Glatter	Joe Sachs & Walon Green	November 9, 2000	226255	28.40
141	6	"The Visit"	Jonathan Kaplan	John Wells	November 16, 2000	226256	31.03
142	7	"Rescue Me"	Christopher Chulack	Neal Baer	November 23, 2000	226257	25.79
143	8	"The Dance We Do"	Christopher Misiano	Jack Orman	December 7, 2000	226258	28.08
144	9	"The Greatest of Gifts"	Jonathan Kaplan	Elizabeth Hunter	December 14, 2000	226259	29.84
145	10	"Piece of Mind"	David Nutter	Tom Garrigus & R. Scott Gemmill	January 4, 2001	226260	30.41
146	11	"Rock, Paper, Scissors"	Jonathan Kaplan	Dee Johnson	January 11, 2001	226261	28.35
147	12	"Surrender"	Félix Enríquez Alcalá	Story by : R. Scott Gemmill & Joe Sachs; Teleplay by : Jack Orman	February 1, 2001	226262	26.54
148	13	"Thy Will Be Done"	Richard Thorpe	Story by : Joe Sachs & Meredith Stiehm; Teleplay by : Meredith Stiehm	February 8, 2001	226263	28.20
149	14	"A Walk in the Woods"	John Wells	John Wells	February 15, 2001	226264	26.19
150	15	"The Crossing"	Jonathan Kaplan	Jack Orman	February 22, 2001	226265	27.14
151	16	"Witch Hunt"	Guy Norman Bee	R. Scott Gemmill	March 1, 2001	226266	25.57
152	17	"Survival of the Fittest"	Marita Grabiak	Story by : Elizabeth Hunter; Teleplay by : Joe Sachs	March 29, 2001	226267	24.49
153	18	"April Showers"	Christopher Misiano	Story by : Tom Garrigus & Dee Johnson; Teleplay by : Tom Garrigus	April 19, 2001	226268	24.32
154	19	"Sailing Away"	Laura Innes	Jack Orman & Meredith Stiehm	April 26, 2001	226269	25.41
155	20	"Fear of Commitment"	Anthony Edwards	R. Scott Gemmill	May 3, 2001	226270	21.85
156	21	"Where the Heart Is"	Richard Thorpe	Dee Johnson & Meredith Stiehm	May 10, 2001	226271	23.17
157	22	"Rampage"	Jonathan Kaplan	Story by : Jack Orman & Joe Sachs; Teleplay by : Jack Orman	May 17, 2001	226272	30.72

=== Season 8 (2001–2002) ===
No. overall	No. in season	Title	Directed by	Written by	Original release date	Prod. code	US viewers (millions)
158	1	"Four Corners"	Christopher Misiano	Jack Orman & David Zabel	September 27, 2001	227251	28.20
159	2	"The Longer You Stay"	Jonathan Kaplan	Jack Orman	October 4, 2001	227252	26.90
160	3	"Blood, Sugar, Sex, Magic"	Richard Thorpe	R. Scott Gemmill & Elizabeth Hunter	October 11, 2001	227253	21.68
161	4	"Never Say Never"	Félix Enríquez Alcalá	Dee Johnson	October 18, 2001	227254	26.71
162	5	"Start All Over Again"	Vondie Curtis-Hall	Joe Sachs	October 25, 2001	227255	27.38
163	6	"Supplies and Demands"	Jonathan Kaplan	Meredith Stiehm	November 1, 2001	277256	24.68
164	7	"If I Should Fall from Grace"	Laura Innes	R. Scott Gemmill	November 8, 2001	227257	26.85
165	8	"Partly Cloudy, Chance of Rain"	David Nutter	Jack Orman	November 15, 2001	227258	27.37
166	9	"Quo Vadis?"	Richard Thorpe	Joe Sachs & David Zabel	November 22, 2001	227259	23.58
167	10	"I'll Be Home for Christmas"	Jonathan Kaplan	Dee Johnson & Meredith Stiehm	December 13, 2001	227260	28.87
168	11	"Beyond Repair"	Alan J. Levi	Jack Orman & R. Scott Gemmill	January 10, 2002	227261	25.42
169	12	"A River in Egypt"	Jesús S. Treviño	David Zabel	January 17, 2002	227262	26.14
170	13	"Damage is Done"	Nelson McCormick	Dee Johnson	January 31, 2002	227263	24.75
171	14	"A Simple Twist of Fate"	Christopher Chulack	Jack Orman	February 7, 2002	227264	27.35
172	15	"It's All in Your Head"	Vondie Curtis-Hall	R. Scott Gemmill	February 28, 2002	227265	24.90
173	16	"Secrets and Lies"	Richard Thorpe	John Wells	March 7, 2002	227266	23.78
174	17	"Bygones"	Jessica Yu	Elizabeth Hunter & Meredith Stiehm	March 28, 2002	227267	24.82
175	18	"Orion in the Sky"	Jonathan Kaplan	David Zabel	April 4, 2002	227268	28.51
176	19	"Brothers and Sisters"	Nelson McCormick	R. Scott Gemmill	April 25, 2002	227269	23.78
177	20	"The Letter"	Jack Orman	Jack Orman	May 2, 2002	227270	25.79
178	21	"On the Beach"	John Wells	John Wells	May 9, 2002	227271	28.71
179	22	"Lockdown"	Jonathan Kaplan	Dee Johnson & Joe Sachs	May 16, 2002	227272	27.47

=== Season 9 (2002–2003) ===
No. overall	No. in season	Title	Directed by	Written by	Original release date	Prod. code	US viewers (millions)
180	1	"Chaos Theory"	Jonathan Kaplan	Jack Orman & R. Scott Gemmill	September 26, 2002	175151	26.72
181	2	"Dead Again"	Richard Thorpe	Dee Johnson	October 3, 2002	175152	25.13
182	3	"Insurrection"	Charles Haid	Yahlin Chang & Jack Orman	October 10, 2002	175153	24.74
183	4	"Walk Like a Man"	Félix Enríquez Alcalá	David Zabel	October 17, 2002	175154	25.65
184	5	"A Hopeless Wound"	Laura Innes	Julie Hébert & Joe Sachs	October 31, 2002	175155	23.53
185	6	"One Can Only Hope"	Jonathan Kaplan	Bruce Miller	November 7, 2002	175156	24.39
186	7	"Tell Me Where It Hurts"	Richard Thorpe	R. Scott Gemmill	November 14, 2002	175157	24.28
187	8	"First Snowfall"	Jack Orman	Jack Orman	November 21, 2002	175158	25.85
188	9	"Next of Kin"	Paul McCrane	Dee Johnson	December 5, 2002	175159	23.92
189	10	"Hindsight"	David Nutter	David Zabel	December 12, 2002	175160	22.75
190	11	"A Little Help From My Friends"	Alan J. Levi	Julie Hébert	January 9, 2003	175161	21.52
191	12	"A Saint in the City"	Peggy Rajski	Bruce Miller	January 16, 2003	175162	21.80
192	13	"No Good Deed Goes Unpunished"	Nelson McCormick	R. Scott Gemmill	January 30, 2003	175163	21.90
193	14	"No Strings Attached"	Jonathan Kaplan	Dee Johnson	February 6, 2003	175164	20.91
194	15	"A Boy Falling Out of the Sky"	Charles Haid	R. Scott Gemmill & Yahlin Chang	February 13, 2003	175165	20.59
195	16	"A Thousand Cranes"	Jonathan Kaplan	David Zabel	February 20, 2003	175166	22.37
196	17	"The Advocate"	Julie Hébert	Joe Sachs	March 13, 2003	175167	20.92
197	18	"Finders Keepers"	T.R. Babu Subramaniam	Dee Johnson	April 3, 2003	175168	18.93
198	19	"Things Change"	Richard Thorpe	R. Scott Gemmill	April 24, 2003	175169	20.88
199	20	"Foreign Affairs"	Jonathan Kaplan	David Zabel	May 1, 2003	175170	19.55
200	21	"When Night Meets Day"	Jack Orman	Jack Orman	May 8, 2003	175171	21.90
201	22	"Kisangani"	Christopher Chulack	John Wells	May 15, 2003	175172	21.61

=== Season 10 (2003–2004) ===
No. overall	No. in season	Title	Directed by	Written by	Original release date	Prod. code	US viewers (millions)
202	1	"Now What?"	Jonathan Kaplan	John Wells	September 25, 2003	176001	23.22
203	2	"The Lost"	Christopher Chulack	John Wells	October 2, 2003	176002	20.77
204	3	"Dear Abby"	Christopher Chulack	R. Scott Gemmill	October 9, 2003	176003	20.05
205	4	"Shifts Happen"	Julie Hébert	Dee Johnson	October 23, 2003	176004	18.01
206	5	"Out of Africa"	Jonathan Kaplan	David Zabel	October 30, 2003	176005	19.91
207	6	"The Greater Good"	Richard Thorpe	R. Scott Gemmill	November 6, 2003	176006	20.04
208	7	"Death and Taxes"	Félix Enríquez Alcalá	Dee Johnson	November 13, 2003	176007	20.66
209	8	"Freefall"	Christopher Chulack	Joe Sachs	November 20, 2003	176008	23.41
210	9	"Missing"	Jonathan Kaplan	David Zabel	December 4, 2003	176009	20.72
211	10	"Makemba"	Christopher Chulack	John Wells	December 11, 2003	176012	19.72
212	11	"Touch and Go"	Richard Thorpe	Mark Morocco	January 8, 2004	176010	22.83
213	12	"NICU"	Laura Innes	Lisa Zwerling	January 15, 2004	176011	21.65
214	13	"Get Carter"	Lesli Linka Glatter	R. Scott Gemmill	February 5, 2004	176013	22.20
215	14	"Impulse Control"	Jonathan Kaplan	Yahlin Chang	February 12, 2004	176014	21.95
216	15	"Blood Relations"	Nelson McCormick	Dee Johnson	February 19, 2004	176015	22.83
217	16	"Forgive and Forget"	Christopher Chulack	Bruce Miller	February 26, 2004	176016	21.87
218	17	"The Student"	Paul McCrane	David Zabel	April 1, 2004	176017	19.24
219	18	"Where There's Smoke"	Tawnia McKiernan	Jacy Young	April 8, 2004	176018	20.00
220	19	"Just a Touch"	Richard Thorpe	R. Scott Gemmill	April 22, 2004	176019	19.85
221	20	"Abby Normal"	Jonathan Kaplan	David Zabel	April 29, 2004	176020	22.03
222	21	"Midnight"	Julie Hébert	John Wells	May 6, 2004	176021	28.37
223	22	"Drive"	Jonathan Kaplan	Dee Johnson	May 13, 2004	176022	23.88

=== Season 11 (2004–2005) ===
No. overall	No. in season	Title	Directed by	Written by	Original release date	Prod. code	US viewers (millions)
224	1	"One for the Road"	Christopher Chulack	Joe Sachs	September 23, 2004	177851	19.69
225	2	"Damaged"	Paul McCrane	David Zabel	October 7, 2004	177852	17.06
226	3	"Try Carter"	Jonathan Kaplan	R. Scott Gemmill	October 14, 2004	177853	16.80
227	4	"Fear"	Lesli Linka Glatter	Dee Johnson	October 21, 2004	177854	16.11
228	5	"An Intern's Guide to the Galaxy"	Arthur Albert	Lisa Zwerling	November 4, 2004	177855	17.01
229	6	"Time of Death"	Christopher Chulack	David Zabel	November 11, 2004	177856	19.83
230	7	"White Guy, Dark Hair"	Nelson McCormick	Lydia Woodward	November 18, 2004	177857	18.90
231	8	"A Shot in the Dark"	Jonathan Kaplan	Joe Sachs	December 2, 2004	177858	17.67
232	9	"Twas the Night"	Julie Hébert	Julie Hébert	December 9, 2004	177859	18.21
233	10	"Skin"	Stephen Cragg	Dee Johnson	January 13, 2005	177860	18.42
234	11	"Only Connect"	Jonathan Kaplan	Yahlin Chang	January 20, 2005	177861	18.82
235	12	"The Providers"	Christopher Chulack	David Zabel	January 27, 2005	177862	19.75
236	13	"Middleman"	Ernest Dickerson	Lisa Zwerling	February 3, 2005	177863	18.09
237	14	"Just as I Am"	Richard Thorpe	Lydia Woodward	February 10, 2005	177864	17.08
238	15	"Alone in a Crowd"	Jonathan Kaplan	Dee Johnson	February 17, 2005	177865	17.74
239	16	"Here and There"	Christopher Chulack	David Zabel	February 24, 2005	177866	16.03
240	17	"Back in the World"	Jonathan Kaplan	David Zabel & Lisa Zwerling	March 24, 2005	177867	15.01
241	18	"Refusal of Care"	Gloria Muzio	Joe Sachs	April 21, 2005	177868	16.05
242	19	"Ruby Redux"	Paul McCrane	Lisa Zwerling & Lydia Woodward	April 28, 2005	177869	14.52
243	20	"You Are Here"	Ernest Dickerson	Karen Maser & Dee Johnson	May 5, 2005	177870	15.66
244	21	"Carter est Amoureux"	Christopher Chulack	John Wells	May 12, 2005	177871	17.16
245	22	"The Show Must Go On"	John Wells	David Zabel	May 19, 2005	177872	18.76

=== Season 12 (2005–2006) ===
No. overall	No. in season	Title	Directed by	Written by	Original release date	Prod. code	US viewers (millions)
246	1	"Cañon City"	Christopher Chulack	Lisa Zwerling, John Wells & Joe Sachs	September 22, 2005	2T6051	14.37
247	2	"Nobody's Baby"	Laura Innes	R. Scott Gemmill	September 29, 2005	2T6052	14.44
248	3	"Man with No Name"	Christopher Chulack	David Zabel	October 6, 2005	2T6053	14.15
249	4	"Blame It on the Rain"	Paul McCrane	R. Scott Gemmill	October 13, 2005	2T6054	13.61
250	5	"Wake Up"	Arthur Albert	Janine Sherman Barrois	October 20, 2005	2T6055	14.70
251	6	"Dream House"	Stephen Cragg	David Zabel	November 3, 2005	2T6056	14.29
252	7	"The Human Shield"	Laura Innes	R. Scott Gemmill	November 10, 2005	2T6057	15.44
253	8	"Two Ships"	Christopher Chulack	Joe Sachs & Virgil Williams	November 17, 2005	2T6058	15.30
254	9	"I Do"	Gloria Muzio	Lydia Woodward	December 1, 2005	2T6060	15.44
255	10	"All About Christmas Eve"	Lesli Linka Glatter	Janine Sherman Barrois	December 8, 2005	2T6059	15.34
256	11	"If Not Now"	John Gallagher	David Zabel	January 5, 2006	2T6061	13.97
257	12	"Split Decisions"	Richard Thorpe	R. Scott Gemmill	January 12, 2006	2T6062	15.40
258	13	"Body & Soul"	Paul McCrane	Joe Sachs	February 2, 2006	2T6064	13.76
259	14	"Quintessence of Dust"	Joanna Kerns	Lisa Zwerling & David Zabel	February 9, 2006	2T6065	14.16
260	15	"Darfur"	Richard Thorpe	Janine Sherman Barrois	March 2, 2006	2T6063	12.90
261	16	"Out on a Limb"	Lesli Linka Glatter	Karen Maser	March 16, 2006	2T6066	13.98
262	17	"Lost in America"	Stephen Cragg	Lisa Zwerling	March 23, 2006	2T6067	13.53
263	18	"Strange Bedfellows"	Laura Innes	Virgil Williams	March 30, 2006	2T6068	12.78
264	19	"No Place to Hide"	Skipp Sudduth	Lydia Woodward	April 27, 2006	2T6069	12.34
265	20	"There Are No Angels Here"	Christopher Chulack	R. Scott Gemmill & David Zabel	May 4, 2006	2T6070	11.78
266	21	"The Gallant Hero & the Tragic Victor"	Steve Shill	R. Scott Gemmill	May 11, 2006	2T6071	13.25
267	22	"Twenty-One Guns"	Nelson McCormick	David Zabel	May 18, 2006	2T6072	16.56

=== Season 13 (2006–2007) ===
No. overall	No. in season	Title	Directed by	Written by	Original release date	Prod. code	US viewers (millions)
268	1	"Bloodline"	Stephen Cragg	Joe Sachs & David Zabel	September 21, 2006	2T7801	15.59
269	2	"Graduation Day"	Joanna Kerns	Janine Sherman Barrois & Lisa Zwerling	September 28, 2006	2T7802	14.36
270	3	"Somebody to Love"	Stephen Cragg	David Zabel	October 5, 2006	2T7803	14.68
271	4	"Parenthood"	Tawnia McKiernan	R. Scott Gemmill	October 12, 2006	2T7804	14.58
272	5	"Ames v. Kovac"	Richard Thorpe	Joe Sachs	October 19, 2006	2T7805	13.72
273	6	"Heart of the Matter"	Andrew Bernstein	Janine Sherman Barrois	November 2, 2006	2T7806	13.85
274	7	"Jigsaw"	John Wells	Virgil Williams	November 9, 2006	2T7807	14.56
275	8	"Reason to Believe"	Ernest Dickerson	R. Scott Gemmill & David Zabel	November 16, 2006	2T7808	12.52
276	9	"Scoop and Run"	Stephen Cragg	Lisa Zwerling	November 23, 2006	2T7809	13.04
277	10	"Tell Me No Secrets..."	Laura Innes	Karen Maser	November 30, 2006	2T7810	13.36
278	11	"City of Mercy"	Stephen Cragg	David Zabel & Lisa Zwerling	December 7, 2006	2T7812	12.02
279	12	"Breach of Trust"	Skipp Sudduth	Janine Sherman Barrois	January 4, 2007	2T7811	10.93
280	13	"A House Divided"	Andrew Bernstein	R. Scott Gemmill	January 11, 2007	2T7813	12.18
281	14	"Murmurs of the Heart"	Christopher Chulack	David Zabel	February 1, 2007	2T7814	11.79
282	15	"Dying Is Easy..."	Tawnia McKiernan	Janine Sherman Barrois	February 8, 2007	2T7815	11.53
283	16	"Crisis of Conscience"	Steve Shill	Lisa Zwerling	February 15, 2007	2T7816	11.60
284	17	"From Here to Paternity"	Lesli Linka Glatter	Virgil Williams	February 22, 2007	2T7817	10.00
285	18	"Photographs and Memories"	Stephen Cragg	Karen Maser	April 12, 2007	2T7818	9.24
286	19	"Family Business"	Richard Thorpe	Joe Sachs	April 19, 2007	2T7819	9.31
287	20	"Lights Out"	Terrence Nightingall	Janine Sherman Barrois	April 26, 2007	2T7820	9.52
288	21	"I Don't"	Andrew Bernstein	David Zabel	May 3, 2007	2T7822	7.78
289	22	"Sea Change"	Laura Innes	Lisa Zwerling	May 10, 2007	2T7821	9.39
290	23	"The Honeymoon Is Over"	Christopher Chulack	R. Scott Gemmill & David Zabel	May 17, 2007	2T7823	9.51

=== Season 14 (2007–2008) ===
No. overall	No. in season	Title	Directed by	Written by	Original release date	Prod. code	US viewers (millions)
291	1	"The War Comes Home"	Stephen Cragg	Joe Sachs & David Zabel	September 27, 2007	3T6151	9.92
292	2	"In a Different Light"	Richard Thorpe	Lisa Zwerling & Karen Maser	October 4, 2007	3T6152	9.09
293	3	"Officer Down"	Christopher Chulack	Janine Sherman Barrois	October 11, 2007	3T6153	8.53
294	4	"Gravity"	Stephen Cragg	Virgil Williams	October 18, 2007	3T6154	10.12
295	5	"Under the Influence"	Anthony Hemingway	Joe Sachs	October 25, 2007	3T6155	9.25
296	6	"The Test"	Félix Enríquez Alcalá	Lisa Zwerling	November 1, 2007	3T6156	9.15
297	7	"Blackout"	Christopher Chulack	David Zabel	November 8, 2007	3T6157	8.44
298	8	"Coming Home"	Laura Innes	David Zabel	November 15, 2007	3T6158	9.60
299	9	"Skye's the Limit"	Paul McCrane	Karen Maser	November 29, 2007	3T6159	8.71
300	10	"300 Patients"	John Wells	Joe Sachs & David Zabel	December 6, 2007	3T6160	8.15
301	11	"Status Quo"	Andrew Bernstein	Janine Sherman Barrois	January 3, 2008	3T6161	9.38
302	12	"Believe the Unseen"	Rob Hardy	Virgil Williams	January 10, 2008	3T6162	9.07
303	13	"Atonement"	Stephen Cragg	Lisa Zwerling	January 17, 2008	3T6163	8.92
304	14	"Owner of a Broken Heart"	Christopher Chulack	David Zabel & Joe Sachs	April 10, 2008	3T6165	7.52
305	15	"…As the Day She Was Born"	Tawnia McKiernan	Shannon Goss	April 17, 2008	3T6164	7.82
306	16	"Truth Will Out"	Andrew Bernstein	Story by : Karen Maser; Teleplay by : Karen Maser & Lisa Zwerling	April 24, 2008	3T6166	7.53
307	17	"Under Pressure"	Stephen Cragg	Janine Sherman Barrois	May 1, 2008	3T6167	7.81
308	18	"Tandem Repeats"	Anthony Hemingway	Virgil Williams	May 8, 2008	3T6168	7.56
309	19	"The Chicago Way"	Christopher Chulack	David Zabel & Lisa Zwerling	May 15, 2008	3T6169	8.43

=== Season 15 (2008–2009) ===
No. overall	No. in season	Title	Directed by	Written by	Original release date	Prod. code	US viewers (millions)
310	1	"Life After Death"	Christopher Misiano	Joe Sachs	September 25, 2008	3T7101	8.03
311	2	"Another Thursday at County"	Paul McCrane	Lisa Zwerling	October 9, 2008	3T7102	9.41
312	3	"The Book of Abby"	Christopher Chulack	David Zabel	October 16, 2008	3T7103	8.96
313	4	"Parental Guidance"	John Gallagher	Janine Sherman Barrois	October 23, 2008	3T7104	8.82
314	5	"Haunted"	Christopher Chulack	Karen Maser	October 30, 2008	3T7105	9.19
315	6	"Oh, Brother"	Stephen Cragg	Virgil Williams	November 6, 2008	3T7106	8.61
316	7	"Heal Thyself"	David Zabel	David Zabel	November 13, 2008	3T7108	9.90
317	8	"Age of Innocence"	Paul McCrane	Janine Sherman Barrois	November 20, 2008	3T7107	8.88
318	9	"Let It Snow"	Charles Haid	Joe Sachs	December 4, 2008	3T7109	8.20
319	10	"The High Holiday"	Lesli Linka Glatter	Shannon Goss	December 11, 2008	3T7110	9.04
320	11	"Separation Anxiety"	Terence Nightingall	Virgil Williams	January 8, 2009	3T7111	7.34
321	12	"Dream Runner"	Andrew Bernstein	Lisa Zwerling	January 15, 2009	3T7112	6.95
322	13	"Love Is a Battlefield"	Richard Thorpe	Karen Maser	January 22, 2009	3T7113	7.65
323	14	"A Long, Strange Trip"	Mimi Leder	Joe Sachs	February 5, 2009	3T7116	7.25
324	15	"The Family Man"	Eriq La Salle	Andrew Fash	February 12, 2009	3T7114	7.24
325	16	"The Beginning of the End"	Jonathan Kaplan	David Zabel & Lisa Zwerling	February 19, 2009	3T7115	7.51
326	17	"T-Minus-6"	Rod Holcomb	David Zabel & Lisa Zwerling	February 26, 2009	3T7117	8.72
327	18	"What We Do"	David Zabel	David Zabel	March 5, 2009	3T7118	8.71
328	19	"Old Times"	John Wells	John Wells	March 12, 2009	3T7119	10.86
329	20	"Shifting Equilibrium"	Andrew Bernstein	Lisa Zwerling	March 19, 2009	3T7120	9.47
330	21	"I Feel Good"	Stephen Cragg	Joe Sachs	March 26, 2009	3T7121	10.36
331	22	"And in the End..."	Rod Holcomb	John Wells	April 2, 2009	3T7122-23	16.38

=== Retrospective Special (2009) ===
This one-hour retrospective was aired before the series finale. It featured behind the scenes production of the series.

== Home video releases ==
In Australia the first three season DVDs featured 3x dual sided discs plus 1 single sided disc. Dual sided discs requires flipping the disc over to play the other side.

Season	Episodes	DVD release dates			
Season	Episodes	Region 1	Region 2	Region 4	Discs
1	25	August 26, 2003	February 23, 2004	May 12, 2004	7
2	22	April 27, 2004	July 26, 2004	July 14, 2004	7
3	22	April 26, 2005	January 31, 2005	December 15, 2004	7
4	22	December 20, 2005	May 16, 2005	April 13, 2005	6
5	22	July 11, 2006	October 25, 2005	November 16, 2005	6
6	22	December 19, 2006	April 6, 2006	May 3, 2006	6
7	22	May 15, 2007	September 18, 2006	October 4, 2006	6
8	22	January 22, 2008	July 16, 2007	September 5, 2007	6
9	22	June 17, 2008	October 29, 2007	October 31, 2007	6
10	22	March 3, 2009	January 28, 2008	May 7, 2008	6
11	22	July 14, 2009	April 21, 2008	May 7, 2008	6
12	22	January 12, 2010	September 15, 2008	October 1, 2008	6
13	23	July 6, 2010	November 24, 2008	April 29, 2009	6
14	19	January 11, 2011	May 18, 2009	April 28, 2010	5
15	22	July 12, 2011	September 21, 2009	October 13, 2010	5
