= ER season 9 =

ER
- Season 9
- DVD cover
- Starring: Noah Wyle; Laura Innes; Mekhi Phifer; Alex Kingston; Goran Visnjic; Maura Tierney; Sherry Stringfield; Ming-Na; Sharif Atkins; Paul McCrane
- No. of episodes: 22

Release
- Original network: NBC
- Original release: September 26, 2002 – May 15, 2003

Season chronology
- ← Previous; Season 8 Next → Season 10

The ninth season of the American fictional drama television series ER first aired on NBC on September 26, 2002, and concluded on May 15, 2003. The ninth season consists of 22 episodes.

== Plot ==
For the first time John Carter becomes the central character and Noah Wyle receives star billing. The death of Mark Greene continues to affect his colleagues while a grieving Corday has left Chicago for England. She returns and a medical student raises eyebrows. The ER is still plagued by the smallpox disease at the beginning. Elsewhere Romano suffers a horrific injury which has consequences throughout the season, Weaver finds herself promoted, Abby's family troubles resurface, Pratt continues to get on the wrong side of his colleagues, and Kovač and Carter join a relief mission in Africa, setting up a continuing story thread for following seasons. Carter deals with professional and family issues while other staff members have their own problems. Over the course of this season, Romano suffers setbacks after losing his arm, Abby and Carter lean towards a relationship, Pratt has troubles in both his personal and professional life.

== Cast ==
=== Main cast ===
- Noah Wyle as Dr. John Carter – Attending Physician
- Laura Innes as Dr. Kerry Weaver – Chief of Emergency Medicine and Chief of Staff
- Mekhi Phifer as Dr. Greg Pratt – ER Intern (First-year Resident)
- Alex Kingston as Dr. Elizabeth Corday – Associate Chief of Surgery
- Goran Visnjic as Dr. Luka Kovač – Attending Emergency Physician
- Maura Tierney as Nurse Manager Abby Lockhart – RN and Nurse Manager
- Sherry Stringfield as Dr. Susan Lewis – Attending Emergency Physician
- Ming-Na as Dr. Jing-Mei Chen – Attending Emergency Physician
- Sharif Atkins as Michael Gallant – Fourth-year Rotating Medical Student
- Paul McCrane as Dr. Robert Romano – Chief of Staff and Chief of Surgery and Chief of Emergency Medicine

=== Supporting cast ===
Doctors and medical students

- Sam Anderson as Dr. Jack Kayson – Chief of Cardiology
- John Aylward as Dr. Donald Anspaugh – Surgical Attending Physician and Hospital Board Member
- Don Cheadle as Paul Nathan – Medical Student
- Leslie Bibb as Erin Harkins – Medical Student
- John Doman as Dr. Carl DeRaad – Chief of Psychiatry
- Michael Buchman Silver as Dr. Paul Meyers – Psychiatrist
- Scott Jaeck as Dr. Steven Flint – Chief of Radiology
- Bruno Campos as Dr. Eddie Dorset – Vascular Surgeon
- Matthew Glave as Dr. Dale Edson
- Perry Anzilotti as Dr. Ed – Anesthesiologist
- Megan Cole as Dr. Alice Upton – Pathologist
- David Allen Brooks as Dr. Gunn
- Andy Umberger as Dr. David Harvey
- Dee Freeman as Dr. Lutz
- Randy Lowell as Dr. Dan Shine
- Christopher Grove as Dr. Marty Kline

Nurses

- Ellen Crawford as Nurse Lydia Wright
- Conni Marie Brazelton as Nurse Conni Oligario
- Deezer D as Nurse Malik McGrath
- Laura Cerón as Nurse Chuny Marquez
- Yvette Freeman as Nurse Haleh Adams
- Lily Mariye as Nurse Lily Jarvik
- Gedde Watanabe as Nurse Yosh Takata
- Donal Logue as Flight Nurse Chuck Martin
- Dinah Lenney as Nurse Shirley
- Kyle Richards as Nurse Dori Kerns
- Nadia Shazana as Nurse Jacy
- Bellina Logan as Nurse Kit
- Lucy Rodriguez as Nurse Bjerke
- Sumalee Montano as Nurse Duvata Mahal
- Gina Philips as Nurse Kathy
- Linda Shing as ICU Nurse Corazon

Staff, paramedics and officers

- Abraham Benrubi as Desk Clerk Jerry Markovic
- Troy Evans as Desk Clerk Frank Martin
- Kristin Minter as Desk Clerk Miranda "Randi" Fronczak
- Deborah May as Director of Nursing Mary Cain
- Erica Gimpel as Social Worker Adele Newman
- Pamela Sinha as Desk Clerk Amira
- Emily Wagner as Paramedic Doris Pickman
- Montae Russell as Paramedic Dwight Zadro
- Lynn Alicia Henderson as Paramedic Pamela Olbes
- Demetrius Navarro as Paramedic Morales
- Brian Lester as Paramedic Brian Dumar
- Michelle Bonilla as Paramedic Christine Harms
- Julie Ann Emery as Paramedic Niki Lumley
- Chad McKnight as Officer Wilson

Family

- Sally Field as Maggie Wyczenski
- Tom Everett Scott as Eric Wyczenski
- Paul Freeman as Dr. Charles Corday
- Judy Parfitt as Isabelle Corday
- Frances Sternhagen as Millicent Carter
- Michael Gross as Mr. John "Jack" Carter
- Lisa Vidal as Sandy Lopez
- Marcello Thedford as Leon Pratt

=== Notable guest stars ===
- Chris Pine as Levine
- Paul Hipp as Craig Turner
- Josh Radnor as Keith
- Crispin Bonham Carter as Passenger
- Lee Tergesen as Demerol Addict
- Bruce Weitz as John Bright
- Katherine LaNasa as Janet Wilco
- Edward Asner and Liz Torres as patients
- Patrick Fugit as Sean Simmons
- Katee Sackhoff as Jason's girlfriend
- Josh Hutcherson as Matt
- Aaron Paul as Doug
- Amaury Nolasco as Ricky
- Jerry Trainor as Darius
- Michael Peña as Police Officer
- Lake Bell as Jody Holmes
- Eli Wallach as Mr. Langston

== Production ==
Original executive producers John Wells and Michael Crichton reprised their roles. Long-time crew member Jack Orman returned as executive producer and showrunner. Previous executive producer Christopher Chulack remained a consulting producer while working on Wells' Third Watch. R. Scott Gemmill and Dee Johnson continued to act as co-executive producers. Medical expert Joe Sachs remained a supervising producer. Richard Thorpe, Joe Sachs, and Wendy Spence Rosato returned as producers. They were joined by new producer Bruce Miller. Eighth season executive story editor David Zabel and unit production manager Tommy Burns joined the production team as co-producers for the ninth season. New crew member Julie Hébert began the season as a co-producer. Zabel and Hebert were promoted to producer's mid-season. Hebert left the crew with the close of the season. Teresa Salamunovich returned to the crew as an associate producer for the ninth season. She was joined by new associate producers Erin Mitchell (for the entire season) and Shelagh O'Brien (after the mid-season break).

Wells wrote a further episode for the season. Gemmill was the season's most prolific writer with five episodes. Johnson and Orman each wrote four episodes. Zabel and Hebert each wrote three episodes. Sachs and Miller each wrote two episodes. Yahlin Chang joined the writing staff as a story editor in 2002 and contributed to four episodes as a writer and twelve episodes as an executive story editor and one episode as a co-producer between 2002 and 2005. Wells was promoted to executive story editor mid-season but left the staff with the close of the season. New writer Arthur Albert wrote a single episode.

Producers Kaplan and Thorpe served as the season's regular directors. Kaplan helmed five episodes while Thorpe directed four. Chulack directed a further episode. Showrunner Orman helmed a further two episodes. New producer Hebert directed a single episode. Returning director Charles Haid directed two episodes. Cast members Laura Innes and Paul McCrane each directed an episode, McCrane making his series debut. Returning directors were Félix Enríquez Alcalá, David Nutter, Nelson McCormick, TR Babu Subramaniam, and Alan J. Levi. Peggy Rajski was the season's only new director.

== Episodes ==
No. overall	No. in season	Title	Directed by	Written by	Original release date	Prod. code	US viewers (millions)
180	1	"Chaos Theory"	Jonathan Kaplan	Jack Orman & R. Scott Gemmill	September 26, 2002	175151	26.72
As the smallpox crisis continues, the disease is identified as a variant of monkeypox originating in the Congo. While treatment with the smallpox vaccine begins, the CDC orders the entire evacuation of the hospital and Carter, Abby, Chen, and Pratt are placed under quarantine. As the evacuation goes awry Romano and Kovač argue over the use of the last helicopter (Romano wants to airlift out a very old man suffering from liver failure), Romano's arm is severed when he backs into the chopper's tail rotor. As Kovač battles to keep him alive in a deserted ER, Lewis is left stuck on the roof with Romano's dying patient. A grieving Corday has returned to London where her Americanized ways raise eyebrows among her British colleagues and drive home how she will no longer accept or adapt to their archaic, sexist practices. Abby and Carter's relationship becomes intimate and continues when the quarantine ends. The young boy who initially presented with the virus survives while his little sister ends up being the only casualty of the outbreak.
181	2	"Dead Again"	Richard Thorpe	Dee Johnson	October 3, 2002	175152	25.13
Local ER closings wreak havoc at County, as Carter tries to keep the peace. Weaver steps on a still-grieving Corday's toes, and a med student awaits her overdue orientation. Pratt's inability to follow orders results in tragedy for a family when he resuscitates a brain dead father. Gallant drives everyone crazy during his psych rotation.
182	3	"Insurrection"	Charles Haid	Yahlin Chang & Jack Orman	October 10, 2002	175153	24.74
Carter takes drastic steps to improve security conditions at County after a frustrated patient takes violent and near-fatal action, leading to a split amongst the ER staff with Kovač supporting him and Susan sticking to doing her job. Gallant tends to a hypochondriac who refuses to leave any symptom unchecked; Pratt is keeping a secret about his home situation but takes time to console a badly shaken Chen; and Kovač has an unhappy ex-lover to contend with. Kerry agrees to permit installing new security measures but announces major service cuts and layoffs in order to pay for it giving Carter the choice of who gets fired, as Carter shrugs off her attempts to punish him for doing the right thing.
183	4	"Walk Like a Man"	Félix Enríquez Alcalá	David Zabel	October 17, 2002	175154	25.65
Tensions between meek med student Gallant and arrogant intern Pratt reach a fever pitch as they battle over two troubled patients, the hypochondriac from the week before and a troubled Army veteran who may have attempted suicide. Abby tries to set the record straight with Carter about her drinking and Weaver makes a disastrous television appearance before revealing the reason behind her muddled behavior. Kerry makes Abby nurse manager, despite Abby not wanting to take the job. Kovač sleeps with a patient's mom and earns Susan's visible disgust, not that he cares, though he feels bad when he finds out his fling's daughter has a serious health problem and the mom takes out her anger and fear on him.
184	5	"A Hopeless Wound"	Laura Innes	Julie Hébert & Joe Sachs	October 31, 2002	175155	23.53
A suspicious fire on Halloween floods the ER with many bizarrely costumed victims. Marquez threatens to file a grievance against an increasingly gross Kovač as he offends Abby and treats a single mom whose newborn baby is very ill, Romano's rehab lags behind his expectations as he begins to doubt that his role in surgery is still an option, and the staff greets an older but wiser medical student, Paul Nathan, who tries to overcome a daunting physical disability and Corday's disapproval but impresses the staff by diagnosing a case of flesh-eating bacteria.
185	6	"One Can Only Hope"	Jonathan Kaplan	Bruce Miller	November 7, 2002	175156	24.39
Corday clashes with the new medical student, Paul Nathan, over his intervention in the treatment of a sickly young woman who signs a "Do Not Resuscitate" agreement. Abby's brother Eric returns with some all-too-familiar manic tendencies, Chen gives in to Pratt's sort-of-tender loving care after a violent patient gets under her skin, and tensions between the nurses and doctors hit a fever pitch as a petition against Kovač leaves the ER short-staffed.
186	7	"Tell Me Where It Hurts"	Richard Thorpe	R. Scott Gemmill	November 14, 2002	175157	24.28
Kovač hits a new low in his search for a sexual high, Corday and Nathan reach an impasse regarding his future in medicine, Chen helps Carter treat a Chinese immigrant being exploited by her employer, and Abby fears the worst when her brother Eric disappears and she finds out he's been hiding serious mental issues from her.
187	8	"First Snowfall"	Jack Orman	Jack Orman	November 21, 2002	175158	25.85
Abby's family nightmare continues when she and her mother, Maggie, go in search of her AWOL brother, Eric and find him locked up on a military base in Nebraska. Back in Chicago, a blizzard entangles the city and Nathan and Corday have to convince a grieving father to agree to a procedure to save his son's life after the rest of his family is killed by a drunk driver.
188	9	"Next of Kin"	Paul McCrane	Dee Johnson	December 5, 2002	175159	23.92
Abby races to stop Maggie from taking manic-depressive Eric out of treatment, and Kovač hits a new low when he accepts a $10,000 tip from an elderly woman for his medical services. An abandoned baby dredges up painful memories for Chen, Pratt goes to bat for Leon after he is fired for allegedly stealing from his job, a father's death leads to a revelation about his daughter, and Lewis helps a woman who's being beaten up by her son.
189	10	"Hindsight"	David Nutter	David Zabel	December 12, 2002	175160	22.75
After a late-night car accident involving the increasingly self-destructive Kovač and med student Harkins, the story unfolds backwards to recount the troubling events leading up to the crash. A boozy holiday party, rumors of an illicit tryst and a run-in with his ex, Abby, all plague Kovač, but it is his tragic misdiagnosis of a patient that ultimately sends him racing off on a reckless ride. The ER is awash in Christmas casualties, including a case that resonates with Kovač as it involves a Croatian war criminal and the survivor from the family he killed.
190	11	"A Little Help From My Friends"	Alan J. Levi	Julie Hébert	January 9, 2003	175161	21.52
Kovač pays the price for his misdiagnosis that left a patient with brain damage, and Romano harshly lets him know that any confessions will produce even more suffering, which would also be his fault. Pratt is caught bringing a gun into the emergency room and Carter slowly figures out he is protecting Leon and tries to help him, Weaver hopes to keep her pregnancy a secret but physical complications might compromise her plans, Lewis keeps a wary eye on a self-destructive patient who admits to wanting to molest young boys, and a family clash involving an elderly patriarch and his pregnancy-questing trophy wife keep everyone else busy.
191	12	"A Saint in the City"	Peggy Rajski	Bruce Miller	January 16, 2003	175162	21.80
Ethical crises abound after Weaver agrees to hide a politician's sexually transmitted disease. Kovač plays God to get a critical patient into surgery and Pratt wants to override a dying mom's spiteful non-starter ideas for her kids' custody, while also dealing with more problems with Leon. Carter's fortunes fail to pay off for an ailing doctor running a local clinic, and he admits to Abby that his family's wealth came from predatory capitalism and that he's ashamed of it, leading her to tell him he should use the Carter fortune for good causes.
192	13	"No Good Deed Goes Unpunished"	Nelson McCormick	R. Scott Gemmill	January 30, 2003	175163	21.90
Carter's plan to help an ailing doctor leads to a dead-end – and a decision about his own career path. Pratt intervenes after a burglary lands Leon's pal in the ER, along with the cop his so-called friends shot. Weaver's ethics are tested even further while setting up a photo-op for a politician hiding a severe condition, and she sees Kovač go AWOL from his job after she is unsympathetic to his depressive spiral. Corday is caught off guard by hot-shot new surgeon, Dr. Dorset, and Romano risks his standing at County by taking the lead on a surgery he is incapable of completing. Abby's brother Eric, now on his bipolar meds, visits and reconciles with her.
193	14	"No Strings Attached"	Jonathan Kaplan	Dee Johnson	February 6, 2003	175164	20.91
A downed plane over the Great Lakes sends Abby's world into a tailspin. Romano's surgical career is altered forever, Weaver gets a promotion from a grateful alderman, and a terminal patient helps Lewis weigh the pros and cons of a blind date while she handles a case where an unpopular student either mistakenly or deliberately ran down her classmates. Pratt has an unexpected reaction to Chen's revelation about her baby, while Chen disgusts Abby with her hardline response to a case where a devoted single mother is stabbed while working as a prostitute.
194	15	"A Boy Falling Out of the Sky"	Charles Haid	R. Scott Gemmill & Yahlin Chang	February 13, 2003	175165	20.59
Carter comes to the rescue when the stalled search for Abby's brother, Eric – and the arrival of her mother, Maggie – pushes the nurse to her limit. Kovač comes back to work just before Weaver's final deadline and saves an overdose case from frying his own brain. Pratt digs himself into a deeper hole with Chen during his stint with the EMTs and Lewis is also flattered by her teenaged admirer but gets an earful from his protective mother.
195	16	"A Thousand Cranes"	Jonathan Kaplan	David Zabel	February 20, 2003	175166	22.37
Three persons are murdered during a holdup at Doc Magoo's, and Chen's partial description of one of the perps leads to an unpleasant morning of racial profiling for Pratt and Gallant. Kovač works hard to avoid attending mandatory Psych counseling. Lewis and her terminally ill teenage patient have a nice day together, and Carter decides to propose to Abby, who is having difficulty finding someone to give her mother a ride to the bus station for her trip back to Minnesota.
196	17	"The Advocate"	Julie Hébert	Joe Sachs	March 13, 2003	175167	20.92
A favor for a popular but closeted politician has dire results for Weaver – and the politician's secret lover (Josh Radnor). Carter and Abby come to terms with their ailing romance while treating a poisoned wife who doesn't hold back on how much she hates her wimpy husband. Kovač finds an unusual outlet for his inner demons and Romano's days as Chief of Staff end abruptly when Anspaugh assigns Weaver to replace him.
197	18	"Finders Keepers"	T.R. Babu Subramaniam	Dee Johnson	April 3, 2003	175168	18.93
Heads roll and hearts break after Romano is demoted to the ER and becomes a lot more annoying and pushes everyone around, and a mom-to-be hears grim news about her own health. Pratt's faux pas spoils Chen's birthday and Kovač implores Weaver and Corday to help him arrange a pro-bono operation for a dying Croatian child. A patient's broken wrist leads to tragic complications – and a change of perspective for a County newlywed.
198	19	"Things Change"	Richard Thorpe	R. Scott Gemmill	April 24, 2003	175169	20.88
Lewis works with a mentally ill man who took too much of his anti-psychotic medication, Kovač welcomes an old friend – a fellow Croatian doctor – to observe the chaos of an American inner-city hospital, Romano discusses grave options about his arm with Corday, and Carter receives some emotional news from home.
199	20	"Foreign Affairs"	Jonathan Kaplan	David Zabel	May 1, 2003	175170	19.55
Kovač defies protocol and his superiors to get a dying Croatian boy heart surgery in Chicago. Lewis considers whether she wants to end her relationship with Chuck. Carter's grandmother's funeral is interrupted by Abby's brother Eric, further damaging Carter and Abby's relationship. A minor league baseball player with a serious heart ailment is treated on the eve of his pitching debut with the Chicago Cubs. Romano decides to have his injured arm amputated after unknowingly setting it on fire. Kovač departs for the Congo after saying goodbye to Abby. A family of three are rushed in after a drive-by shooting that leaves the young daughter crippled. The oldest brother Curtis, a former gang member, rejoins his gang for a gang retaliation despite Carter's attempts to dissuade him, leading to multiple gun shot victims arriving at the ER.
200	21	"When Night Meets Day"	Jack Orman	Jack Orman	May 8, 2003	175171	21.90
On the day of a solar eclipse, the ER is slammed with cases: Carter is the focus, while Pratt is the focus of the nightshift (it's also Pratt's last planned shift at County before he moves on to work at Northwestern). Rapidly alternating shots of the two shifts show Carter dealing with a mass cult suicide and Pratt with the victims of a gang war resulting from the drive-by shooting the week before. Other cases include a drowning victim who Carter initially believes has little chance but recovers that night while being treated by Pratt, a Buddhist nun dying of cancer, and a woman who had her baby cut out of her. Corday offers support as Romano undergoes surgery to amputate his useless arm. Doc Magoo's burns down.
201	22	"Kisangani"	Christopher Chulack	John Wells	May 15, 2003	175172	21.61
After weeks of professional and personal setbacks, Carter leaves the ER – and Abby – behind to join the equally troubled Kovač on a relief mission in the war-torn Congo. Kovač's clinic comes under threat from the Mai Mai before most of his patients can be transported, but a young Mai Mai soldier recognizes Carter as the doctor that tried desperately to save his brother's life; out of respect to Carter, the militiamen allow the patients to leave unharmed. Carter returns to America while Kovač chooses to remain at his clinic with his most critical patients. Features music by Youssou N'Dour, Willie Nelson, the Tin Hat Trio and Jamshied Sharifi.
