= ER season 8 =

ER
- Season 8
- DVD cover
- Starring: Anthony Edwards; Noah Wyle; Laura Innes; Alex Kingston; Paul McCrane; Goran Visnjic; Maura Tierney; Sherry Stringfield; Michael Michele; Erik Palladino; Ming-Na; Eriq La Salle; Sharif Atkins
- No. of episodes: 22

Release
- Original network: NBC
- Original release: September 27, 2001 – May 16, 2002

Season chronology
- ← Previous; Season 7 Next → Season 9

The eighth season of the American fictional drama television series ER first aired on NBC on September 27, 2001, and concluded on May 16, 2002. The eighth season consists of 22 episodes.

== Plot ==
After being gone for five years, Susan Lewis returns to the show providing continuity of the earlier years and some closure with Greene. Greene begins to experience health problems and deals with Rachel after she starts causing problems. In addition, Weaver also has a revelation and confronts and accepts her sexuality. The season's long story line of Greene's illness and death and how it affects many characters marks the season as a major turning point in the series. This season also saw a major change in the cast, with four characters leaving, including original characters Greene and Benton as well as Cleo and Dave. Abby tries to help a neighbor with an abusive boyfriend but faces repercussions, and Kovac retaliates against the man who assaulted her. In turn, two new main characters with very different personalities – Michael Gallant and Greg Pratt – are introduced. In this season, several staff members face personal and professional pressures, including Greene and Corday who face the most difficult issue of all when their baby overdoses on ecstasy pills. The two argue over Rachel's presence in their home after their baby nearly dies. Weaver becomes more aggressive and she accepts that she is a lesbian. Greene's final episode as a regular character is the 21st episode. Benton and Finch also leave to make new changes in their lives. After Greene's death, many of the characters become affected, especially Carter who reads two letters to the staff. A plague hits the ER as the season ends. Several members attend Mark's funeral. Following Mark's death, John Carter is centered as the main character of the show for the first time.

== Cast ==
This season saw the final appearance on ER of series regulars Michael Michele and Erik Palladino, and the final appearances as series regulars for Anthony Edwards (Note: later appeared once, in flashback footage, in season 15, episode 7) and Eriq La Salle. (Note: later appears in season 15, episode 7 and the season 15 series finale)

=== Main cast ===
- Anthony Edwards as Dr. Mark Greene – Attending Emergency Physician
- Noah Wyle as Dr. John Carter – Chief Resident (Fifth-year ER Resident)
- Laura Innes as Dr. Kerry Weaver – Chief of Emergency Medicine
- Alex Kingston as Dr. Elizabeth Corday – Associate Chief of Surgery
- Paul McCrane as Dr. Robert Romano – Chief of Staff and Chief of Surgery
- Goran Visnjic as Dr. Luka Kovač – Attending Emergency Physician
- Maura Tierney as Nurse Abby Lockhart – ER Registered Nurse (RN)
- Sherry Stringfield as Dr. Susan Lewis – Attending Emergency Physician (episodes 4–22)
- Michael Michele as Dr. Cleo Finch – Fourth-year Pediatric and ER Senior Resident (episodes 1–10 & 21)
- Erik Palladino as Dr. Dave Malucci – Fourth-year Senior Resident (episodes 1–4)
- Ming-Na as Dr. Jing-Mei Chen – Chief Resident, later Attending Emergency Physician
- Eriq La Salle as Dr. Peter Benton – Attending Surgeon and Director of Diversity (episodes 1–10, 15 & 21)
- Sharif Atkins as Lt. Michael Gallant – Third-year Rotating Medical Student (main: episodes 15–22; recurring: episodes 7−9, 11−13)

=== Supporting cast ===
Doctors and medical students

- John Aylward as Dr. Donald Anspaugh – Surgical Attending Physician and Hospital Board Member
- Mekhi Phifer as Dr. Greg Pratt – ER Intern
- David Brisbin as Dr. Alexander Babcock – Anesthesiologist
- Iqbal Theba as Dr. Zagerby – Ophthalmologist
- Matthew Glave as Dr. Dale Edson
- Perry Anzilotti as Dr. Ed – Anesthesiologist
- Megan Cole as Dr. Alice Upton – Pathologist
- Eddie Shin as Stanley Mao – Medical Student
- Dee Freeman as Dr. Lutz

Nurses

- Ellen Crawford as Nurse Lydia Wright
- Conni Marie Brazelton as Nurse Conni Oligario
- Deezer D as Nurse Malik McGrath
- Laura Cerón as Nurse Chuny Marquez
- Yvette Freeman as Nurse Manager Haleh Adams
- Lily Mariye as Nurse Lily Jarvik
- Gedde Watanabe as Nurse Yosh Takata
- Dinah Lenney as Nurse Shirley
- Bellina Logan as Nurse Kit
- Kyle Richards as Nurse Dori
- Nadia Shazana as Nurse Jacy
- Lucy Rodriguez as Nurse Bjerke
- Elizabeth Rodriguez as Nurse Sandra
- Linda Shing as ICU Nurse Corazon

Staff, paramedics and officers

- Abraham Benrubi as Desk Clerk Jerry Markovic
- Troy Evans as Desk Clerk Frank Martin
- Kristin Minter as Desk Clerk Miranda "Randi" Fronczak
- Pamela Sinha as Desk Clerk Amira
- Julie Delpy as ER Aide Nicole
- Erica Gimpel as Social Worker Adele Newman
- Skip Stellrecht as Chaplain Miller
- Emily Wagner as Paramedic Doris Pickman
- Montae Russell as Paramedic Dwight Zadro
- Lynn Alicia Henderson as Paramedic Pamela Olbes
- Demetrius Navarro as Paramedic Morales
- Brian Lester as Paramedic Brian Dumar
- Michelle Bonilla as Paramedic Christine Harms
- Ed Lauter as Fire Captain Dannaker
- Julie Ann Emery as Paramedic Niki Lumley
- Chad McKnight as Officer Wilson
- David Roberson as Officer Durcy

Family

- Frances Sternhagen as Grandma Millicent "Gamma" Carter
- Michael Gross as Mr. John "Jack" Carter II
- Mary McDonnell as Mrs. Eleanor Carter
- Christine Harnos as Jennifer Simon
- Hallee Hirsh as Rachel Greene
- Lisa Vidal as Sandy Lopez
- Khandi Alexander as Jackie Robbins
- Tamala Jones as Joanie Robbins
- Vondie Curtis Hall as Roger McGrath
- Matthew Watkins as Reese Benton
- Kathleen Wilhoite as Chloe Lewis
- Sally Field as Maggie Wyczenski (uncredited voice)
- Mark Valley as Richard Lockhart

=== Notable guest stars ===
- Kal Penn as Narajan
- David Hewlett as Mr. Schudy
- Vernée Watson Johnson as April Wilson
- Roma Maffia as Ms. Janice Prager
- David Krumholtz as Paul Sobriki
- Liza Weil as Samantha Sobriki
- Christina Hendricks as Joyce Westlake
- Matthew Settle as Brian Westlake
- Chris Sarandon as Dr. Burke (NYC)
- Michael Ironside as Dr. William "Wild Willy" Swift
- Paul Hipp as Craig Turner
- Amy Carlson as FDNY Paramedic Alex Taylor
- Molly Price as NYPD Officer Faith Yokas
- Kim Raver as FDNY Paramedic Kim Zambrano
- Jason Wiles as NYPD Officer Bosco Boscorelli
- Joe Lisi as NYPD Lieutenant Bob Swersky
- Dana Elcar as Manny, a blind patient
- Bellamy Young as Grace
- Keegan-Michael Key as Witowski
- Lori Petty as Shane
- Chris Burke as George
- Julie Delpy as Nicole
- Ken Lerner as Mr. Sidell
- Mackenzie Phillips as Leslie Miller

== Production ==
Original executive producers John Wells and Michael Crichton reprised their roles. Seventh season executive producer Jack Orman returned as executive producer and show runner. Previous executive producer Christopher Chulack remained a consulting producer while working on Wells' Third Watch. Seventh season co-executive producer Meredith Stiehm also served as a consulting producer for the eighth season but left the crew with the close of the season. Seventh season supervising producers R. Scott Gemmill and Dee Johnson were promoted to co-executive producers for the eighth season. Seventh season producers Richard Thorpe, Joe Sachs, Jonathan Kaplan, and Wendy Spence Rosato all returned for the eighth season. Sachs was promoted to supervising producer mid-season. Michael Salamunovich returned as co-producer but left the crew with the close of the season.

Wells wrote a further two episodes for the season. Orman was the seasons prolific writer with six episodes. Gemmill wrote five episodes. Sachs wrote three episodes. Johnson wrote four episodes. Stiehm wrote three episodes. David Zabel joined the crew as executive story editor and contributed to four episodes as a writer. Writer Elizabeth Hunter became a story editor for the second half of the season only and wrote two further episodes.

Producers Kaplan and Thorpe served as the season's regular directors. Kaplan helmed five episodes while Thorpe directed four. New directors Nelson McCormick and actor Vondie Curtis-Hall each directed two episodes. Cast member and regular director Laura Innes helmed a further episode. Series veterans Félix Enríquez Alcalá, Christopher Misiano, David Nutter, and Tom Moore all returned to direct further episodes. Show runner Orman made his television directing debut with an episode. The season's other new directors were Alan J. Levi, Jessica Yu, and Jesús S. Treviño.

== Episodes ==
No. overall	No. in season	Title	Directed by	Written by	Original release date	Prod. code	US viewers (millions)
158	1	"Four Corners"	Christopher Misiano	Jack Orman & David Zabel	September 27, 2001	227251	28.20
There are four sections in this episode. Greene hides his role in a killer's death, Carter buries a loved one and must deal with his chilly socialite parents, and Weaver returns to work fearing she has been outed. Cleo begins to experience the side effects of her HIV treatment, Benton reaches out to his grieving sister, and the ER deals with patients after a feud erupts at a local talk show with tragedy striking for one person associated with the talk show. Special Format: Each quarter of the episode follows the perspective of one main character; Weaver, Benton, Carter, and Greene starting at the same point in the story.
159	2	"The Longer You Stay"	Jonathan Kaplan	Jack Orman	October 4, 2001	227252	26.90
Gridlock in the ER leaves an off-duty Carter to handle a patient that Chen and Malucci are treating, only for them to turn it into a grievous error when the patient dies. Benton gets tragic news about Carla and has to tell Reece. Kovač and Abby argue, leading to their breakup. Greene and Corday experience the challenges of two working parents raising a baby. A man from Weaver's past arrives with a lead on her birth mother but demands $400 for the information while Carter talks to Weaver about the possibility of an attending position.
160	3	"Blood, Sugar, Sex, Magic"	Richard Thorpe	R. Scott Gemmill & Elizabeth Hunter	October 11, 2001	227253	21.68
Greene's teen daughter drops by County with some unexpected news, an abandoned baby in Chen's care seems to have healing powers, and Abby ropes Carter into helping her fix a fishy mistake she made while clearing her stuff out of Kovač's place. Cleo gets the all clear after her HIV scare. Weaver fires Malucci after she finds him and a paramedic having sex in an ambulance, and he calls her out before leaving the ER in anger. NOTE: Near the end of the episode, unseen by Dr. Benton, Dr. Romano signs "Take care of your father" to Reese.
161	4	"Never Say Never"	Félix Enríquez Alcalá	Dee Johnson	October 18, 2001	227254	26.71
Dr. Susan Lewis returns and a simple lunch date with Greene leads to a new job at County General. Abby's attempt to make peace with Kovač is impeded by the arrival of his bartending lady friend. Chen takes drastic action after Weaver strips her of the chief-residency position, and Benton works to save a man who thinks his death will improve his family's financial future while Corday and the team treat a six year old boy who has Edwards syndrome but the parents (David Hewlett and Susan Traylor) may have motives for bringing their ill son into the ER. NOTE 1: Dr. Susan Lewis returns to the show after five years. NOTE 2: Final appearance of Dr. Dave Malucci.
162	5	"Start All Over Again"	Vondie Curtis-Hall	Joe Sachs	October 25, 2001	227255	27.38
On her first day back, Lewis puts her new job in jeopardy after clashing with Weaver over a pregnant teen who may be deported if her very strict parents learn of her condition. Corday comes under fire after losing a patient to an odd infection she may be spreading, Carter's grandmother arrives in need of medical care that she doesn't want to face up to, and Abby bristles at a newly emerging relationship in the ER.
163	6	"Supplies and Demands"	Jonathan Kaplan	Meredith Stiehm	November 1, 2001	277256	24.68
Carter and Lewis race to stop a possible outbreak after two college students who attended a college party test positive for meningococcemia. A specialist shadows Corday to find the root of the infection that has killed four of her elderly patients, Abby has a hard time letting Kovač go, especially once his enigmatic lady friend scores a job at the hospital, and Benton squares off with Roger over his expanded and irritating role in Reese's life.
164	7	"If I Should Fall from Grace"	Laura Innes	R. Scott Gemmill	November 8, 2001	227257	26.85
Carter discovers the sad truth about what is ailing his grandmother. Luka is torn over a case where an aging mall security guard may have caused a severe injury to a rude pre-teen. Roger sues Benton for custody of Reese, Nicole gets a grim life lesson during her first day of training as a nurse's aide, and Corday gets a possible lead on why so many of her patients are dying while Greene's daughter Rachel gets suspended from school. A new medical student arrives in the ER and is introduced to his new coworkers. NOTE: First appearance of medical student Michael Gallant.
165	8	"Partly Cloudy, Chance of Rain"	David Nutter	Jack Orman	November 15, 2001	227258	27.37
As a storm soaks Chicago, Weaver and Gallant race to save a pregnant woman trapped in a crashed ambulance surrounded by live power lines. Carter's grandmother arrives with a mysterious injury and it's discovered that she has a morbid link to a hit-and-run victim, and Greene treats a teen taking the fall for losing his baby brother in a flooded river. Benton's hopes of winning custody of Reese fade when a fateful DNA test threatens to change everything; Cleo ends her days at County General; Nicole gives Kovač bad news after being busted for burglary.
166	9	"Quo Vadis?"	Richard Thorpe	Joe Sachs & David Zabel	November 22, 2001	227259	23.58
Benton and Roger face-off in court over custody of Reese, a firefighter piques Weaver's interest, Carter tends to a newlywed who may be allergic to her own husband, then lets Lewis in on his true feelings about her. Nicole drops a new bombshell on Kovač after Abby busts her for lying about the baby. Corday waits for a widower to give the transplant team permission to harvest his brain-dead wife's internal organs, and Greene drug-tests his daughter after she is busted with her pot-smoking beau. He also deals with a boxer and the boxer's brother and dad.
167	10	"I'll Be Home for Christmas"	Jonathan Kaplan	Dee Johnson & Meredith Stiehm	December 13, 2001	227260	28.87
Romano forces Benton to make a decision about his future at County as the custody trial for Reese reaches its climax. Carter's father drops a holiday bombshell and Kovač's former flame resurfaces with yet another secret. Weaver and Lopez have their first date and the staff pray for a Christmas miracle after a young mom arrives with her critically injured son. Benton departs County after performing a final, near-miraculous surgery. NOTE: Final regular appearances of Dr. Peter Benton and Dr. Cleo Finch.
168	11	"Beyond Repair"	Alan J. Levi	Jack Orman & R. Scott Gemmill	January 10, 2002	227261	25.42
As a cold front hits, Carter tries to hash things out with his mother and has a chilling run-in with a killer from his past. Chen is searching for clues about Weaver's pager. Abby tries to help a child who is searching for his mother in the ER---later learning grave news about the young woman. Weaver's closeted lifestyle sends Lopez packing and Abby spends her birthday falling into a dangerous old habit. Greene finds cause for alarm among Rachel's things.
169	12	"A River in Egypt"	Jesús S. Treviño	David Zabel	January 17, 2002	227262	26.14
Lopez takes drastic action to push Weaver out of the closet, Romano forces Kerry to rehire a vengeful Chen, Abby tries and fails to help her neighbor escape an abusive situation, and Greene makes a decision about Rachel's future in Chicago after tending to the health issues of an estranged father---who suffered a heart attack en route the wedding of the daughter who refuses to forgive him. Carter gets roped into playing peacemaker between his mother and his absentee father, and Lewis sympathizes with an injured prisoner who was sentenced to death. Chen stares Kerry down in the doctors' lounge and refuses to back down.
170	13	"Damage is Done"	Nelson McCormick	Dee Johnson	January 31, 2002	227263	24.75
Greene faces the awful truth about Rachel after Ella is rushed to County for what he fears may be a drug overdose, while Corday appreciates what Kerry does to help Ella but has no love for Dr. Babcock. Abby puts herself in the line of fire by taking in her battered neighbor and Carter's mother reaches out to a dying child in hopes of righting a past wrong. Weaver takes the low road to punish Lewis for accepting a promotion and Chen decides it is time to lose the gloves in her dealings with a duplicitous colleague.
171	14	"A Simple Twist of Fate"	Christopher Chulack	Jack Orman	February 7, 2002	227264	27.35
Corday takes drastic action against Rachel for Ella's near-fatal drug overdose, leading to a huge schism with Mark. Abby suffers for helping Joyce escape Brian's abuse; afterwards, a furious Kovač confronts Brian in a bar and beats Brian up while warning him not to come near Abby again. Greene's health takes an ominous turn. Carter's mother is forced to relive a past loss while tending to a young cancer patient and a string of food poisonings cause Lewis to flex her muscles as the newest member of management. Jerry's back.
172	15	"It's All in Your Head"	Vondie Curtis-Hall	R. Scott Gemmill	February 28, 2002	227265	24.90
Mark finds out his cancer is returned and is terminal. He then heads back to work in Chicago to his ongoing estrangement from Elizabeth, while Susan cares for him after he undergoes a procedure that will give him only several more month of life. But he successfully gets the bitter son of a kind but brain-damaged father to admit to his wrongful actions, while a case where a father burnt himself while both building a bed for his kid and smoking methamphetamine has less positive returns. Elizabeth complains to Peter Benton that Mark won't banish Rachel for good. And Abby becomes Luka's platonic roommate to avoid the violent neighbor who punched her when he isn't sent to prison.
173	16	"Secrets and Lies"	Richard Thorpe	John Wells	March 7, 2002	227266	23.78
A mishap with a dominatrix patient's bag of tricks leads to a lecture by Weaver and lands Luka, Abby, Lewis, Carter, and Gallant in a sexual harassment class, where tensions run high among various couplings. In particular, Carter's jealousy which is directed at both Lewis and Kovač, though for different reasons reaches a boiling point. And by the end of the day, one pair is forced to face the truth about their dead-in-the-water romance. Later, all involved realize they made a big mistake by opening the bag, but Carter amusedly notes how he figured out a way to prank Kerry.
174	17	"Bygones"	Jessica Yu	Elizabeth Hunter & Meredith Stiehm	March 28, 2002	227267	24.82
Romano forces Corday to work in the ER, where she begins to realize that Lewis may hold the key to her estranged husband's disturbing behavior. While Lewis refuses to divulge Greene's secret, she pushes Corday to figure it out for herself, but Greene tells her not to come home and pretend they still have a marriage. After a brutal case involving sisters who don't like each other, Corday gets some straight talk from Romano that sends her back to her home and to Mark. Greene also reveals his condition to the hospital at large while Rachel figures it out for herself. Weaver tries to keep it together after Lopez is reported to have been lost in a school fire. When Lopez turns out to be alright, Weaver visits her at a bar and they kiss. A pair of college students are rushed into surgery following a knife attack on campus that hits close to home for Weaver. After one of the victims whispers to her that she loved the other one, Weaver suspects a deeper relationship between the two and that the surviving victim was actually the attacker. Abby settles into life at Kovač's while she searches for a new home.
175	18	"Orion in the Sky"	Jonathan Kaplan	David Zabel	April 4, 2002	227268	28.51
Training an arrogant intern leads Greene to a life-altering realization about the future of his own medical care and his ability to provide it to others. Elsewhere, a patient dealing with addiction gets a lesson in life's hardships after she goes into premature labor, a museum worker displays signs of a legendary ailment usually attributed to the undead, and Corday is forced to give in to a terminal patient's demands to die with dignity. Greene then refuses treatment and finishes his last shift to spend his last days with his fractured family. NOTE: First appearance of Dr. Greg Pratt.
176	19	"Brothers and Sisters"	Nelson McCormick	R. Scott Gemmill	April 25, 2002	227269	23.78
A frantic phone call sends Lewis racing to New York, where she enlists police officers Faith Yokas and Maurice Boscorelli to locate her missing sister and niece. Back at County, Carter confronts Abby about her drinking but fails to sell her on a sober life; Corday gets bad news from Rachel concerning Mark in Hawaii; Pratt annoys Chen and his showboating puts Gallant and a patient in peril. This episode begins a crossover with Third Watch that concludes on "Unleashed". Amy Carlson, Molly Price, Kim Raver and Jason Wiles guest star as their respective Third Watch characters Alex Taylor, Faith Yokas, Kim Zambrano and Maurice Boscorelli.
177	20	"The Letter"	Jack Orman	Jack Orman	May 2, 2002	227270	25.79
As the staff tends to several patients, two letters from Greene and Corday prompt Carter to confront Abby about her drinking, while Weaver sees the note as a reason to check her own health and try her hand at romance. A car crash reveals a shocking truth about Lewis' teen patient; and Pratt gets bad news about where he will be spending his internship.
178	21	"On the Beach"	John Wells	John Wells	May 9, 2002	227271	28.71
These are the final days of Dr. Mark Greene's life. He spends them in Hawaii, where he grew up, with his daughter Rachel in the hope that the trip will give the often antagonistic pair a chance to reconnect and heal old wounds before it is too late. The unexpected arrival of Corday and baby Ella, both having been summoned to Hawaii by Rachel due to her concerns about her father's increasingly ailing health allows the weakening Greene to see his fractured family reunited before his death. A few days later, Greene's funeral is held with members of the ER and OR staff all in attendance. NOTE: Final regular appearance of Dr. Mark Greene. Final appearance of Dr. Cleo Finch.
179	22	"Lockdown"	Jonathan Kaplan	Dee Johnson & Joe Sachs	May 16, 2002	227272	27.47
The usual chaos at County General quickly goes from frenzied to frightening when two children are brought in with symptoms eerily similar to the dreaded smallpox. Racing to stop a possible plague – and national panic – Carter immediately orders an ER lockdown, leaving Weaver outside and a waiting room full of anxious patients trapped inside in the sweltering heat, causing tempers to rise. As Lewis takes control of things and attempts to contact the CDC about a vaccine, one patient's condition continues to deteriorate, while Chen and Pratt begin to show symptoms of exposure. NOTE: Anthony Edwards was still credited in this episode, despite officially leaving the series in the previous episode.
