= ER season 10 =

ER
- Season 10
- DVD cover
- Starring: Noah Wyle; Laura Innes; Mekhi Phifer; Alex Kingston; Goran Visnjic; Maura Tierney; Sherry Stringfield; Ming-Na; Sharif Atkins; Parminder Nagra; Linda Cardellini; Paul McCrane
- No. of episodes: 22

Release
- Original network: NBC
- Original release: September 25, 2003 – May 13, 2004

Season chronology
- ← Previous; Season 9 Next → Season 11

The tenth season of the American fictional drama television series ER first aired on NBC on September 25, 2003, and concluded on May 13, 2004. The tenth season consists of 22 episodes.

== Plot ==
New characters arrive in the form of medical student Neela Rasgotra, hapless resident Archie Morris, and Nurse Samantha Taggart who fills the void left by Abby who returns to medical school. The aftermath of Kovač and Carter's mission in Africa becomes a key story throughout the season, a Thanksgiving tragedy sees the end of Romano, Lewis copes with an unexpected pregnancy, Pratt's professionalism is tested again by his colleagues, Gallant is deployed to Iraq, and both Chen and Weaver deal with personal losses. Kovač returns from Africa, determined to settle his affairs and return to the ER. Sam and Kovač share a relationship, but Sam's ex-boyfriend arrives.

== Cast ==
=== Main cast ===
- Noah Wyle as Dr. John Carter – Attending Emergency Physician
- Laura Innes as Dr. Kerry Weaver – Chief of Staff and Chief of Emergency Medicine
- Mekhi Phifer as Dr. Greg Pratt – Second-year ER Resident
- Alex Kingston as Dr. Elizabeth Corday – Chief of Surgery
- Goran Visnjic as Dr. Luka Kovač – Attending Emergency Physician
- Maura Tierney as Abby Lockhart – Fourth-year Medical Student and Nurse Manager
- Sherry Stringfield as Dr. Susan Lewis – Attending Emergency Physician
- Ming-Na as Dr. Jing-Mei Chen – Attending Emergency Physician
- Sharif Atkins as Dr. Michael Gallant – ER Intern (First-year Resident) (episodes 1–18)
- Parminder Nagra as Neela Rasgotra – Fourth-year Medical Student
- Linda Cardellini as Nurse Samantha Taggart (episodes 5–22) – ER Registered Nurse
- Paul McCrane as Dr. Robert Romano – Chief of Emergency Medicine (episodes 1–8)

=== Supporting cast ===
Doctors and medical students

- Sam Anderson as Dr. Jack Kayson – Chief of Cardiology
- Amy Aquino as Dr. Janet Coburn – Chief of Obstetrics and Gynecology
- John Aylward as Dr. Donald Anspaugh – Surgeon and Hospital Board Member
- Scott Grimes as Dr. Archie Morris – ER Second Year Resident
- L. Scott Caldwell as Dr. Megan Rabb – Director of Neo-Natology
- Glenn Howerton as Dr. Nick Cooper – ER Second Year Resident
- Bruno Campos as Dr. Eddie Dorset – Vascular Surgeon
- Maury Sterling as Dr. Nelson – Psychiatrist
- Paul Blackthorne as Dr. Jeremy Lawson – Invasive Radiologist
- Rossif Sutherland as Lester Kertzenstein – Medical Student
- Perry Anzilotti as Dr. Ed – Anesthesiologist
- Nicholas D'Agosto as Andy – Medical Student
- Shi Ne Nelson as Sheila – Medical Student
- K.T. Thangavelu as Dr. Subramanian
- Randy Lowell as Dr. Dan Shine – Hematologist

Nurses

- Ellen Crawford as Nurse Lydia Wright
- Conni Marie Brazelton as Nurse Conni Oligario
- Deezer D as Nurse Malik McGrath
- Laura Cerón as Nurse Chuny Marquez
- Yvette Freeman as Nurse Haleh Adams
- Lily Mariye as Nurse Lily Jarvik
- Gedde Watanabe as Nurse Yosh Takata
- Donal Logue as Flight Nurse Chuck Martin
- Dinah Lenney as Nurse Shirley
- Bellina Logan as Nurse Kit
- Kyle Richards as Nurse Dori Kerns
- Liza Del Mundo as Nurse Severa
- Sumalee Montano as Nurse Duvata Mahal
- Nadia Shazana as OR Nurse Jacy
- Kelsey Oldershaw as Nurse Tess
- Tane Kawasaki as Nurse Claire
- Cynthia Cervini as Nurse Anna Waldron

Staff, paramedics and officers

- Abraham Benrubi as Desk Clerk Jerry Markovic
- Daniel Dae Kim as Social Worker Ken Sung
- Troy Evans as Desk Clerk Frank Martin
- Kristin Minter as Desk Clerk Miranda "Randi" Fronczak
- Pamela Sinha as Desk Clerk Amira
- Emily Wagner as Paramedic Doris Pickman
- Montae Russell as Paramedic Dwight Zadro
- Lyn Alicia Henderson as Paramedic Pamela Olbes
- Michelle Bonilla as Paramedic Christine Harms
- Demetrius Navarro as Paramedic Morales
- Brian Lester as Paramedic Brian Dumar
- Louie Liberti as Paramedic Bardelli
- Chad McKnight as Officer Wilson
- Michael Peña as Police Officer

Family

- Mark Valley as Richard Lockhart
- Cabria Baird or Brittney Baird as Ella Greene
- Hallee Hirsh as Rachel Greene
- Michael Gross as Mr. John "Jack" Carter
- Thandie Newton as Makemba "Kem" Likasu
- George Cheung as Mr. Chen
- Kieu Chinh as Mrs. Chen
- Lisa Vidal as Sandy Lopez
- Renee Victor as Florina Lopez
- Tito Ortiz as Carlos Lopez
- José Zúñiga as Eduardo Lopez
- Paul Dooley as Harry Lewis
- Oliver Davis as Alex Taggart
- Cole Hauser as Steve Curtis
- Joy Bryant as Valerie Gallant

=== Special appearances ===
- Mary McCormack as Debbie
- Zac Efron as Bobby
- Bob Newhart as Ben Hollander
- Sarah Shahi as Tara King
- J.K. Simmons as Gus Loomer
- Jessica Chastain as Dahlia Taslitz
- Rocky Carroll as Mr. Walker
- Kevin Sussman as Colin
- Patrick Kerr as George Deakins
- Efren Ramirez as Jimmy
- Betsy Brandt as Franny Myers
- Khleo Thomas as Brian
- Rob McElhenney as Andy Fesh
- Richard Kline as Arnie Nadler Risk Assessment Expert
- Aisha Hinds as Medical Board Testing Administrator

== Episodes ==
| No. overall | No. in season | Title | Directed by | Written by | Original release date | Prod. code | US viewers (millions) |
|---|---|---|---|---|---|---|---|
| 202 | 1 | "Now What?" | Jonathan Kaplan | John Wells | September 25, 2003 | 176001 | 23.22 |
The ER is undergoing extensive renovations. Carter returns from Africa to find a hostile Abby and they exchange numerous unhappy, bitter words. Meanwhile, a new medical student, Neela Rasgotra, causes a stir when she unexpectedly helps a patient – and angers Chen as Pratt flirts with her. Romano sports a new look after removal of his arm. Kerry delivers all of her statements by screaming at whoever is near her. When Neela informs the ER of Luka's supposed death in Africa, Carter returns to Africa in the hope of finding Luka's body. NOTE: First appearance of medical student Neela Rasgotra.
| 203 | 2 | "The Lost" | Christopher Chulack | John Wells | October 2, 2003 | 176002 | 20.77 |
Carter returns to the Congo to search for Kovač's body and reunites with several associates. Kovač's story in the Congo after Carter's departure is told in flashbacks as he battles debilitating malaria while delaying evacuation and is captured by the rebels, who murder a number of Westerners and un-affiliated Congo citizens. Carter, however, learns that the rebels mistook Kovač for a priest, thanks to a cross necklace given to him by a patient, and left Kovač alive. After rescuing his friend, Carter arranges for Kovač's return to Chicago while volunteering to stay himself.
| 204 | 3 | "Dear Abby" | Christopher Chulack | R. Scott Gemmill | October 9, 2003 | 176003 | 20.05 |
Abby's frustrating day starts with an awful round of managing triage and gets worse when she gets a special "Dear Abby" letter from Carter in the Congo while her fellow nurses threaten a walkout and her opinions are ignored. Romano's mood gets nastier when he is fitted with an antiquated hook for his missing arm. Pratt uneasily meets Chen's old-fashioned parents for dinner in what turns into the last supper of their relationship. Also, three new second-year residents join the staff – including bumbling Archie Morris and the self-assured Dr. "Coop". NOTE: First appearance of Dr. Archie Morris.
| 205 | 4 | "Shifts Happen" | Julie Hébert | Dee Johnson | October 23, 2003 | 176004 | 18.01 |
Pratt and Weaver wind up on the wrong side of two judgment calls during a hellacious night shift that also finds Morris doing his best to dodge involvement in anything serious. Abby, seeking funds to return to medical school, has a frosty meeting with her ex-husband. Neela deals with a little girl who arrives with her beloved grandmother whose status is DNR. Corday warms up to Dr. Dorset.
| 206 | 5 | "Out of Africa" | Jonathan Kaplan | David Zabel | October 30, 2003 | 176005 | 19.91 |
Kovač's first day back in the ER is a busy one. Lewis fears for a distraught architect, Ben Hollander (Bob Newhart), whose degenerating eyesight makes him despondent. A spirited new nurse, Samantha "Sam" Taggart, replaces Abby – who returns to medical school but also continues to work as a nurse to afford the tuition. Morris is left greatly overwhelmed by the chaos and grisly conditions of life in the ER, especially a case involving an injured child and his desperate, alcoholic mother. Romano shows off his new prosthetic arm, and Elizabeth finds out that her new lover Dr. Dorset is married. NOTE: First appearance of Nurse Samantha Taggart.
| 207 | 6 | "The Greater Good" | Richard Thorpe | R. Scott Gemmill | November 6, 2003 | 176006 | 20.04 |
Pratt and Kovač clash over a miscarriage-prone young woman who arrives to deliver a premature baby, as Kovač seeks to stop inefficient ER practices; Lewis goes above and beyond the call of duty to help Ben Hollander cope with his failing vision; and Coop makes a romantic play for Chen.
| 208 | 7 | "Death and Taxes" | Félix Enríquez Alcalá | Dee Johnson | November 13, 2003 | 176007 | 20.66 |
Lewis is stressed over an IRS audit. Sam's son spends a day underfoot at the ER. Gallant must gamble with a risky hospital transfer to help a young septic cancer patient, Romano lets Pratt know he's out to wreck his career as soon as he has enough information to do so, and Chen gets bad news from China about her parents. Abby works a family involved in an accident with no apparent serious injuries only for the baby to be brought back with a skull fracture by the mother's boyfriend; she and Susan both think Abby made a mistake, but they learn there's another and much more horrible explanation. A case involving a young prisoner whose treatment in jail has a devastating medical result impacts much of the staff. Ben Hollander reaches a breaking point over his oncoming blindness and takes decisive action to deal with it.
| 209 | 8 | "Freefall" | Christopher Chulack | Joe Sachs | November 20, 2003 | 176008 | 23.41 |
A Thanksgiving helicopter tragedy high above the ER has the County staff racing to aid the survivors. Elsewhere, Romano "fires" the brash Pratt and catches Morris with cannabis. Lewis fears the worst about one of the possible casualties. Romano was in the ambulance bay and the chopper lands on him, inflicting fatal injuries. After they work well together in handling the crisis, Kovač enjoys Thanksgiving dinner with Sam and her son Alex. NOTE: Final regular appearance of Dr. Robert Romano.
| 210 | 9 | "Missing" | Jonathan Kaplan | David Zabel | December 4, 2003 | 176009 | 20.72 |
Two distinct cultures collide when Neela treats two Amish teenagers involved in a car accident. Corday is the only person who is mourning the death of Romano, since everyone else is either respectfully glad he's no longer there or (Pratt) flat-out happy he's dead and gone. Elsewhere, Sam clashes with sympathetic Kovač when he pays too much attention to her trouble-prone son Alex, Gallant is happy when his sister visits but annoyed when she is more interested in hanging out with Pratt, and Abby is pained when an unconscious 5-year-old girl cannot be traced to any parent or guardian.
| 211 | 10 | "Makemba" | Christopher Chulack | John Wells | December 11, 2003 | 176012 | 19.72 |
On Christmas Eve, a chilled emergency room staff do their best to observe the holiday while a crusading Carter does the same half a world away as his friendship and romantic relationship with Makemba, an Anglo-Congolese AIDS worker, is revealed.
| 212 | 11 | "Touch and Go" | Richard Thorpe | Mark Morocco | January 8, 2004 | 176010 | 22.83 |
Carter returns from Africa full of surprises including a pregnant new love, Makemba ("Kem"). Pratt accidentally breaks a patient's neck while doing an unsupervised intubation. A whole nursing shift cannot go home until they find one missing Valium. Luka weighs his plans for the future: Chicago or the Congo. Gallant doesn't hide that he is displeased his sister slept with Pratt but it's Pratt who gets the extra bad news for his generally terrible day.
| 213 | 12 | "NICU" | Laura Innes | Lisa Zwerling | January 15, 2004 | 176011 | 21.65 |
Neela and Abby face their toughest rotation ever after being assigned to the Neo-natal Intensive Care Unit (NICU) for a month, where Weaver and Sandy need help with their newly born son, Henry. A case involving a very ill infant tests the souls of all the doctors. Abby does well whereas Neela struggles, but both ultimately decide against going into neo-natology.
| 214 | 13 | "Get Carter" | Lesli Linka Glatter | R. Scott Gemmill | February 5, 2004 | 176013 | 22.20 |
Carter's girlfriend, Kem, steps on more than a few toes while spending a day observing County in action. Pratt has a hard night and questions his abilities as he treats a variety of patients. Gallant accompanies the paramedics and is almost shot in a violent domestic dispute when he befriends a frightened boy. Lewis turns down a promotion due to an imminent change in her lifestyle. Weaver gets the last laugh on Romano by using his financial bequest to the hospital to start a gay and lesbian health program.
| 215 | 14 | "Impulse Control" | Jonathan Kaplan | Yahlin Chang | February 12, 2004 | 176014 | 21.95 |
Sam gets personally involved in the case of an abused and newly pregnant teen. The ER deals with victims of a multi-vehicle accident caused when a man with heart troubles passes out and hits two other cars. Abby and Pratt disagree about a patient with a badly swollen knee; Pratt wants to just treat and release him while Abby wants to run tests. Carter shows Kem the city and proposes they move into a townhouse he bought for them, but she decides to return to Africa. An HR consultant, evaluating work conditions as part of a lawsuit settlement prompted by Dr. Romano's behavior, urges Weaver to fire what he sees as an unruly staff, but she ultimately tells him to shove it and makes him leave.
| 216 | 15 | "Blood Relations" | Nelson McCormick | Dee Johnson | February 19, 2004 | 176015 | 22.83 |
Neela is faced with crippling claustrophobia while trapped in a hyperbaric chamber with a newborn baby suffering from carbon monoxide poisoning. The baby's family suffers from it as well with the fact that the mother went into stress-induced labor which woke her up being the only thing that saved them all. The family is expected to make a full recovery, but Neela suffers some health complications of her own from the way she handled her claustrophobia. Meanwhile, Chen returns from China with her ailing father; Weaver breaks the bad news to a mother about her son's leukemia, and Sam ponders the repercussions of her night with Kovač.
| 217 | 16 | "Forgive and Forget" | Christopher Chulack | Bruce Miller | February 26, 2004 | 176016 | 21.87 |
After Morris refuses pain meds to an angry patient, the patient threatens him then follows through on a threat to steal a tank. A brain damaged, uncommunicative man is brought in and his 19-year-old daughter (Jessica Chastain) insists he is not DNR. Frank, after even more "xenophobic, homophobic ranting" (to quote Neela) than usual, collapses with a serious heart attack and is saved by Pratt--who learns a few surprising facts about Frank's past and his life away from the ER. Corday continues to juggle two boyfriends and Sam has second thoughts about keeping it casual with Luka when she sees him with Jillian.
| 218 | 17 | "The Student" | Paul McCrane | David Zabel | April 1, 2004 | 176017 | 19.24 |
After the senior ER leadership ponders the prospects of the med students (they like Abby, think Lester's a joke, and feel Neela is talented but simply not cut out for emergency work) Carter urges Neela to be more pro-active in the ER, then she goes too far in treating a brain-injury patient – and a sympathetic Gallant errs further by falsifying a medical report. Kovač treats the disoriented young son of a man who fears that tests will reveal he's not the boy's father. Chen scrambles to find an appropriate caregiver for her ailing father. Corday is uneasy about dating two men, while a pervert annoys a pregnant Lewis and somehow ends up getting everything he wanted.
| 219 | 18 | "Where There's Smoke" | Tawnia McKiernan | Jacy Young | April 8, 2004 | 176018 | 20.00 |
Weaver rushes to the aid of her partner Sandy when she is severely injured fighting a fire. Lewis suffers labor pains and is confined to bed rest, while tension remains between Gallant and Neela as an investigation begins into the suspicious death. Gallant reveals he is being deployed to Iraq. Sam is surprised by the arrival of Alex's dad. Corday discovers that she is the new Chief of Surgery. NOTE: Final regular appearance of Dr. Michael Gallant.
| 220 | 19 | "Just a Touch" | Richard Thorpe | R. Scott Gemmill | April 22, 2004 | 176019 | 19.85 |
A breast exam lands Pratt in hot water when a woman informally accuses the young doctor of sexual harassment. Abby ponders how to get the attention of her contentious patients during her psych rotation and Neela finds herself studying strokes in a lab populated by brainy but bizarre graduate students. Weaver vows to fight for her baby son and Chen is at wit's end when she brings her combative and ailing father home. Sam is baffled by her ex's return – and Kovač's take on the new man in Alex's life.
| 221 | 20 | "Abby Normal" | Jonathan Kaplan | David Zabel | April 29, 2004 | 176020 | 22.03 |
Weaver considers drastic action to keep Lopez's folks from taking custody of Henry. Abby is in the midst of her psychiatric rotation and tries to help a seizure-prone mother with a controversial drug treatment. Pratt lays into Neela for avoiding the ER to work in a lab. Kovač's relationship with Sam and her son Alex continues awkward as Alex's father continues his stay. Carter impresses a returning Kem – but annoys his father – with a shake-up at his family's foundation.
| 222 | 21 | "Midnight" | Julie Hébert | John Wells | May 6, 2004 | 176021 | 28.37 |
Carter is alarmed as he rushes his pregnant girlfriend Kem into the ER when he suspects trouble but learns the baby died from an unforeseeable accident. Despite his own grief, Carter must help Kem say goodbye to their son after Kem has a stillborn delivery. Corday gets a jolt from the past when the late Dr. Greene's teen daughter Rachel shows up with her boyfriend looking for a haven – and some "morning-after" pills. Neela prepares for her graduation while Abby prefers to sit it out, as Abby was earlier insulted by Kerry over the likelihood of her not passing her boards on a second attempt. Sam's ex makes his intentions clear to Kovač.
| 223 | 22 | "Drive" | Jonathan Kaplan | Dee Johnson | May 13, 2004 | 176022 | 23.88 |
While helping a stranded mother and child, Kovač witnesses a horrific car accident when a drunk and high man hits the people Kovač is helping. Abby struggles to deal with a terminal colon cancer patient who feels alone at the end of his life while she worries about the lack of word on her board results. Neela heads for the University of Michigan to begin her internship. Chen's colleagues question the bruises on Chen's face. Pratt keeps a mentoring eye on young heart patient Elgin while also dealing with the intoxicated driver who hit Kovač's patients. Weaver hopes to gain custody of her son and Sam flees with Alex after Steve settles down in Chicago.
