= Commander in Chief (TV series) =

2005 American political drama series

- Genre: Political drama
- Created by: Rod Lurie
- Starring: Geena Davis; Donald Sutherland; Harry Lennix; Kyle Secor; Ever Carradine; Matt Lanter; Caitlin Wachs; Jasmine Anthony; Mark-Paul Gosselaar
- Country of origin: United States
- Original language: English
- No. of seasons: 1
- No. of episodes: 18

Production
- Executive producers: Rod Lurie; Steven Bochco; Marc Frydman; Dee Johnson
- Producers: James Spies; Sascha Schneider
- Running time: 42 minutes
- Production companies: Battleplan Productions; Steven Bochco Productions (from episode 8); Touchstone Television

Original release
- Network: ABC
- Release: September 27, 2005 – June 14, 2006

Commander in Chief is an American political drama television series that focused on the fictional administration and family of Mackenzie Allen (portrayed by Geena Davis), the first female president of the United States, who ascends to the post from the vice presidency after the death of the sitting president from a sudden cerebral aneurysm.

The series began broadcasting on ABC on Tuesday, September 27, 2005, at 9 p.m. Eastern Time, although most countries outside North America began screening the series in mid-2006.

The show was ranked No. 1 on Tuesday nights until Fox's American Idol started in January. The show was also the No. 1 new show of the season until CBS' Criminal Minds surpassed it. Its major competitor in the 9:00 p.m. timeslot was Fox's House, which aired after American Idol.

The series was created by Rod Lurie, writer and director of the films The Contender and Deterrence.

The network replaced Lurie with Steven Bochco as showrunner. After ratings continued declining, Bochco was replaced by Dee Johnson. Further declining ratings brought about a hiatus, a timeslot change and ultimately cancellation announced in May 2006, with the final episodes airing the following month.

== Characters ==
=== Main ===
- Geena Davis as President Mackenzie Allen
- Donald Sutherland as Speaker Nathan Templeton
- Harry Lennix as White House Chief of Staff Jim Gardner
- Kyle Secor as First Gentleman Rod Calloway
- Ever Carradine as Press Secretary Kelly Ludlow
- Mark-Paul Gosselaar as Richard McDonald, a media consultant
- Matt Lanter as Horace Calloway, President Allen's son, twin of Rebecca
- Caitlin Wachs as Rebecca Calloway, President Allen's older daughter, twin of Horace
- Jasmine Anthony as Amy Calloway, President Allen's younger daughter

=== Recurring ===
- Anthony Azizi as Vince Taylor, personal aide to President Allen
- Natasha Henstridge as Jayne Murray, Chief of Staff to Speaker Templeton
- Peter Coyote as Vice President Warren Keaton
- Polly Bergen as Kate Allen, President Allen's mother
- Matt Barr as Mike Fleming, Rebecca's boyfriend
- Julie Ann Emery as Secret Service Agent Joan Greer
- Scott Atkinson as Steve

== Episodes ==
No.	Title	Directed by	Written by	Original release date	US viewers (millions)
1	"Pilot"	Rod Lurie	Rod Lurie	September 27, 2005	16.37
2	"First Choice"	Rod Lurie	Rod Lurie and Dee Johnson	October 4, 2005	16.94
3	"First Strike"	Rod Lurie	Rod Lurie and Dee Johnson	October 11, 2005	16.23
4	"First Dance"	Vincent Misiano	Steven A. Cohen and Allison Adler	October 18, 2005	16.30
5	"First...Do No Harm"	Dan Minahan	Dahvi Waller and Anya Epstein	October 25, 2005	15.62
6	"First Disaster"	Vincent Misiano	Crystal Nix-Hines and Richard Arthur	November 1, 2005	14.64
7	"First Scandal"	Dan Attias	Rod Lurie and Dee Johnson	November 8, 2005	14.78
8	"Rubie Dubidoux and the Brown Bound Express"	Jeremy Podeswa	Steven Bochco	November 15, 2005	12.57
9	"The Mom Who Came to Dinner"	Chris Long	Steven Bochco, Stuart Stevens, and Steven A. Cohen	November 29, 2005	13.66
During the Thanksgiving holiday, Mackenzie's mother, Kate (Polly Bergen), comes to spend the holiday and is invited to remain permanently. Mac decides to invite Nathan Templeton and his wife to join them for dinner, which Kate insists on cooking herself much to the chagrin of White House tradition. When an independent commission proposes the closing of a major naval base in Mac's home state of Connecticut, which could devastate the local economy, Rod brings in Richard "Dickie" McDonald (Mark-Paul Gosselaar), a media consultant, to help build her image and lagging poll numbers. Mac also weighs her opinion on the fate of a woman on death row.
10	"Sub Enchanted Evening"	Jesse Bochco	Story by : Steven Bochco; Teleplay by : Joel Fields & Tom Szentgyorgyi	January 10, 2006	11.40
11	"No Nukes is Good Nukes"	Bobby Roth	Story by : Steven Bochco; Teleplay by : Joel Fields & Tom Szentgyorgyi	January 17, 2006	11.40
12	"Wind Beneath My Wing"	Greg Yaitanes	Steven Bochco	January 24, 2006	10.38
Templeton and Mac travel to California for the dedication of former President Bridges' Presidential Library. As Air Force One lands, the plane is held hostage by a man who demands to speak with the President or he will blow up the plane. Meanwhile, Kate watches the children while the first couple is out of town, and allows Horace and Rebecca to throw a party for their friends. One of the original texts of the Gettysburg Address is supposedly stolen but six-year-old first daughter Amy Calloway was hiding it to get back at her older siblings. Grandma Kate told them that if it never happened again, she wouldn't say anything.
13	"State of the Unions"	Steve Shill	Dee Johnson & Alison Cross	April 13, 2006	8.20
Mac works on her upcoming State of the Union Address. Rod ends up in an odd position with an intern, after he trips on the way out of a restaurant as paparazzi take pictures of the incident. The following morning, a humiliating photo ends up on the front page of the papers, embarrassing Mac which threatens to politically deteriorate her image. Meanwhile, Templeton sets out to destroy Mac's Homeless Initiative Bill, in return for her to play "political hardball".
14	"The Price You Pay"	Jesse Bochco	Joel Fields	April 20, 2006	7.69
Mac stands by her longtime friend and nominee for Attorney General, Carl Brantley (Adam Arkin), who suffers during his first Senate confirmation hearings after his background is checked. A cargo plane in Pakistan carrying sensitive military weapons goes missing and the Vice President uses his military skill to resolve the situation. Kate leaves for a date which troubles Mac and Rod who mistake her for being lost.
15	"Ties That Bind"	Dan Lerner	Alex Berger and Cynthia J. Cohen	April 27, 2006	6.51
Mac asks the Attorney General to research the growing urban unrest in nearby Prince George's County, Maryland, the home of Chief of Staff Jim Gardner. Meanwhile, a friend from Jim's past pays him a visit at the White House to deliver a first-hand account of the situation. Mac is then informed on the situation of the missing surface-to-air missiles that went down during a military plane crash in Pakistan and are now available on the black market. Mac must use all of her necessary means to determine that the weapons do not fall into the wrong hands. Templeton champions the Templeton Act targeting domestic crime, which Mac threatens to veto, instead supporting more law enforcement and education over the bill's calls for harsher jail sentences. The Bill passes in the House and is expected to tie in the Senate. Templeton-reminding Keaton of the favor he received at his vice presidential confirmation hearings-asks Keaton for a political favor. As his ex officio role as President of the Senate, Keaton has the power to break tied votes. Keaton, seeing no other options proceeds to the Capitol Building, but upon arrival votes down the Templeton Act, and later tenders his resignation to Mac. When Dickie learns of Vince's plans for a commitment ceremony with his partner, he urges him not to invite Mac since it may hurt her in the polls.
16	"The Elephant in the Room"	Bobby Roth	Dee Johnson	May 31, 2006	5.54
17	"Happy Birthday, Madam President"	Jeff Bleckner	Stuart Stevens and Steven A. Cohen	June 7, 2006	5.31
On Mac's birthday, she faces American hostages being taken in Turkey by a militant Kurdish group. Mac is also interviewing candidates to be her new Vice President which Dickie is very opinionated about. Rebecca's new IM buddy is shown to be a very unlikely friend.
18	"Unfinished Business"	Rick Wallace	Steven A. Cohen, Cynthia J. Cohen, and Dee Johnson	June 14, 2006	5.53
Mac's determination to pass the Equal Rights Amendment divides her staff and family over the issue of women's rights. Jim continues to ponder Mac's vice president offer. He tells Mac that he "would be honored to be considered for the Vice-Presidency." Kelly's ex-husband, a journalist, pitches a story to the First Family which Kelly vouches for him on a professional level however is stunned to learn about his new family. Mac fires Dickie because he sabotaged her attempts to get the ERA passed. He then joins Templeton's team. Rebecca is charmed by a new boy she chats with online, who is revealed to be an intern working for Templeton. Templeton announces his presidential bid. The President and Templeton "debate" in a town hall style meeting, and the press and audience widely declare Mac as the winner.

=== "Little Shop of Horace" ===
This episode was scheduled to air on February 21, 2006, after "Wind Beneath My Wings", and a promo was released.

Mac weighs her options on how to deal with a situation in Africa when she learns genocide is taking place in a country there, and it becomes clear there are no easy solutions. Meanwhile, at Dickie's suggestion, Mac considers firing her current Cabinet - many of them holdovers from Teddy Bridges' administration - and bringing in her own in order to start with a clean slate going into her re-election campaign. At the same time, Rod makes a scheduled appearance at a joint U.S.-Cuban children's gymnastics convention, where a freak accident sparks an international situation, and Horace asks Rebecca's friend, Stacey, for help with his homework—but the two end up doing more than just studying.

The episode was written by Tom Szentgyörgyi and directed by Carol Banker.

== Critical reception ==
Commander in Chief received mixed reviews (Davis's performance was largely praised as being a "successful comeback vehicle"), with an aggregate score of 56/100 (26 reviews) on Metacritic. Critics in major U.S. media, cited on the review site Rotten Tomatoes were generally enthusiastic. Some critics described the series as lacking "credibility," approaching "fantasy," and being less about the presidency than about "gender politics."

Reason magazine charged that the series glorified the "Imperial Presidency" and that it favored using government force to impose the personal values of some Americans on others who disagreed with them and to impose the values of those Americans on the rest of the world.

Negative comparisons were drawn with 24's black president David Palmer, as while in that show a black president was depicted as having been voted into office under normal circumstances, Commander in Chief's storyline showed a female president only coming into the presidency because the existing president dies in office.

On the day the series premiered, Davis was reported to have said in an interview, "This is a show about every aspect of the life of a person who is president, the personal side and the public side." A November 2005 review in USA Today noted the show's focus was more on Allen's family than world or national political events; in the same review, Allen's leadership style was compared and contrasted favorably with that of Josiah Bartlet of The West Wing. A reviewer for United Features Syndicate wrote that "While 'Commander' avoids the overt wonkery of 'West Wing,' it also fails to give its audience much credit for knowing history or current events."

=== Ratings ===
The series had good ratings initially, but they waned in subsequent weeks.

The series went on hiatus after its January 24, 2006 episode. In its place, ABC promoted a new Arrested Development-type show titled Sons & Daughters. Commander in Chief was scheduled to return on April 18. However, on March 29, ABC announced that it would instead return on April 13 and move from its Tuesday 9 p.m. slot to a 10 p.m. slot on Thursdays, directly competing with CBS hit Without a Trace and longtime NBC standby ER. Some media experts thought that ABC was hoping the show could be saved by gaining viewers from the surprise reality hit American Inventor aired right before Commander in Chief.

ABC pulled the series from its lineup on May 2, 2006, and on May 13 announced that the show had been cancelled. The remaining three episodes of the season were broadcast after the ratings year had ended.

== Awards and nominations ==
Year	Association	Category	Nominee	Result
2005	Satellite Awards	Best Actress – Television Series Drama	Geena Davis	Nominated
2006	GLAAD Media Awards	Outstanding Drama Series	Commander in Chief	Nominated
2006	Golden Globe Awards	Best Actress – Television Series Drama	Geena Davis	Won
2006	Golden Globe Awards	Best Supporting Actor – Series, Miniseries or Television Film	Donald Sutherland	Nominated
2006	Golden Globe Awards	Best Television Series – Drama	Commander in Chief	Nominated
2006	Golden Reel Awards	Best Sound Editing in Television Short Form	Episode: "Pilot"	Nominated
2006	NAACP Image Awards	Outstanding Drama Series	Commander in Chief	Nominated
2006	NAACP Image Awards	Outstanding Supporting Actor in a Drama Series	Harry Lennix	Nominated
2006	People's Choice Awards	Favorite New Television Drama	Commander in Chief	Nominated
2006	Primetime Emmy Awards	Outstanding Lead Actress in a Drama Series	Geena Davis	Nominated
2006	Screen Actors Guild Awards	Outstanding Performance by a Female Actor in a Drama Series	Geena Davis	Nominated
2006	Young Artist Awards	Best Young Supporting Actress in a Drama Series	Caitlin Wachs	Nominated
2006	Young Artist Awards	Best Young Actress Age Ten or Younger in a Comedy or Drama	Jasmine Jessica Anthony	Nominated
2007	Visual Effects Society Awards	Outstanding Supporting Visual Effect in a Broadcast Program	Episode: "The Wind Beneath Her Wings"	Nominated
2007	Visual Effects Society Awards	Outstanding Model and Miniatures in a Broadcast Program	Episode: "Air Force One"	Nominated

== Home media ==
On April 28, 2006, Buena Vista Home Video formally announced the release of Commander in Chief: The Complete First Season. However, following the show's cancellation, it was decided that it should be split into two volumes.

In Italy, the 5 DVD boxset was released on December 1, 2006 and it contains all original episodes dubbed in Italian plus voice tracks in English and Spanish and also special features the Pilot episode with comments by Rod Lurie and deleted scenes.

DVD name	Ep #	Region 1	Region 2	Description
The Inaugural Edition, Part 1	8	June 27, 2006	N/A	Episodes 1–8
The Inaugural Edition, Part 2	9	September 5, 2006	N/A	Episodes 9–17, Interview with Geena Davis, Unaired Scenes, Bloopers, Exclusive Creator Commentaries.
The Complete First Season	17	N/A	January 29, 2007	Interview with Geena Davis, Unaired Scenes, Bloopers, Exclusive Creator Commentaries.

== International broadcasts ==
- Australia - Previously: Seven Network Australia (Original airing)
  Currently: 7TWO (Encore Screening - 2009). Also screening on Disney plus Australia.
- Asia - STAR World, Hallmark Channel
- Belgium - Fox life
- Bulgaria - Fox life as "Главнокомандващ"
- Canada - CTV (English), Historia (French)
- Denmark - TV 2
- Estonia - Fox life
- Finland - Nelonen
- France - M6 then Téva
- Germany - Sat.1 as "Welcome, Mrs. President"
- Hong Kong - ATV World as 最高統帥 (Commander in Chief)
- Hungary - Viasat 3 as "Az elnöknő" (Mrs. President)
- India - STAR World
- Indonesia - Metro TV
- Republic of Ireland - RTÉ One
- Israel - Yes Stars as "Gvirti Hanasie" (Madam President)
- Italy - Rai Uno and Fox Life as "Una donna alla Casa Bianca" (A woman at the White House)
- Japan - Fox life as "マダム・プレジデント 星条旗をまとった女神"
- Kenya - NTV
- Latin America - Sony Entertainment Television
- Latvia - Fox life
- Lithuania - Fox life
- Malaysia - 8TV
- Middle East - Showtime Arabia / MBC 4
- Netherlands - Foxlife
- New Zealand - TV2
- Norway - TVNORGE
- Philippines - STAR World
- Pakistan - STAR World From October 12, 2007
- Poland - TVP1 as "Pani prezydent" (Madam President)
- Portugal - SIC as "Senhora Presidente" (Mrs. President)
- Russia - Fox Life
- Serbia - RTS 2 as "Predsednica" (Mrs. President)
- Singapore - MediaCorp TV Channel 5
- Slovenia - POP TV as "Gospa predsednica" (Mrs. President)
- South Africa - SABC 2
- South Korea - KBS2
- Spain - People&Arts/La Sexta as "Señora Presidenta" (Mrs. President)
- Sweden - TV4
- Switzerland - SF zwei as "Welcome, Mrs. President" (German+English Bilingual)
- Taiwan - Public Television Service as "白宮女總統" (Female President at the White House)
- Thailand - TrueVisions16 Hallmark Channel as "ประธานาธิบดีดอกไม้เหล็ก"(Iron Flower Mrs. President)
- Trinidad and Tobago - CNMG
- Turkey - DiziMax
- United Kingdom - ABC1 (Apr 2006), More4 (10 October 2006), with repeats on More4, Channel 4, and E4
