= Babu Subramaniam =

American director and assistant director

TR Babu Subramaniam is an American director and assistant director, best known for his work on Star Trek: The Next Generation. He was also involved in several other television series such as ER, The Paper Chase, Third Watch and One Tree Hill.
