= Félix Enríquez Alcalá =

American film and television director (born 1951)

- Born: March 7, 1951 (age 75); Bakersfield, California, U.S.
- Other name: Felix Alcala
- Occupations: Film director, television director and cinematographer
- Years active: 1984–present

Félix Enríquez Alcalá (sometimes credited as Felix Alcala) (born March 7, 1951, in Bakersfield, California) is a Mexican American film and television director.

== Career ==
Alcalá's first major breakthrough came in 1991 when he was hired by Lynn Marie Latham and Bernard Lechowick to direct an episode of ABC's short lived drama series Homefront. Since then he has guest directed on a vast number of series including CSI: Crime Scene Investigation, ER, Dollhouse and House. In 1997, Alcalá made his theatrical film directing debut with the film Fire Down Below starring Steven Seagal.

In 2007, Alcalá was nominated for Outstanding Directing for a Drama Series at the 59th Primetime Emmy Awards for directing the Battlestar Galactica episode Exodus, Part II

== Selected directing credits ==
- Lois & Clark: The New Adventures of Superman – 1 episode, 1994
- NYPD Blue – 1 episode, 1994
- ER – 12 episodes, 1994–2007
- Seduced and Betrayed – TV movie, 1995
- 77 Sunset Strip – TV pilot, 1995
- Sliders – 1 episode, 1995
- Space: Above and Beyond – 2 episodes, 1995
- Deadly Pursuits – TV movie, 1996
- Fire Down Below – theatrical film
- Justice League of America – TV movie, 1997
- The Taking of Pelham One Two Three – TV movie, 1998
- Brimstone – 5 episodes, 1998–1999
- Third Watch – 17 episodes (consultant), 1999–2004
- M.K.3 – TV movie, 2000
- Flashpoint – TV movie, 2002
- John Doe – 1 episode, 2002
- Taken – 1 episode, 2002
- The Guardian – 2 episodes, 2003
- CSI: Crime Scene Investigation – 1 episode, 2003
- CSI: Miami – 1 episode, 2004
- The Shield – 2 episodes, 2003–2004
- Jonny Zero – 2 episodes, 2005
- Law & Order: Special Victims Unit – 1 episode, 2005
- The Unit – 1 episode, 2006
- House M.D. – 1 episode, 2006
- Battlestar Galactica – 2 episodes, 2006
- Battlestar Galactica: Razor – TV movie
- Criminal Minds – 18 episodes, 2005–2016
- Terminator: The Sarah Connor Chronicles – 1 episode, 2008
- Dollhouse – 2 episodes, 2009
- Breaking Bad – 1 episode, 2009
- The Good Wife – 12 episodes, 2010–2016
- Stargate Universe – 1 episode, 2010
- Castle – 1 episode, 2010
- Covert Affairs – 11episodes, 2010–2014
- Blue Bloods – 4 episodes, 2010–2012
- Southland – 4 episodes, 2010–2013
- Sword – short film, 2011
- Suits – 3 episodes 2011–2013
- Grimm – 1 episode, 2012
- NYC 22 – 1 episode, 2012
- Revolution – 1 episode, 2012
- Person of Interest – 1 episode, 2012
- The Tomorrow People – 1 episode, 2013
- Gang Related – 1 episode, 2014
- State of Affairs – 1 episode, 2015
- Resurrection – 1 episode, 2015
- Defiance – 1 episode, 2015
- Satisfaction – 1 episode, 2015
- Agent X – 1 episode, 2015
- Madam Secretary – 13 episodes, 2015–2019
- Second Chance – 2 episodes, 2016
- Quantico – 1 episode, 2016
- Criminal Minds: Beyond Borders – 1 episode, 2016
- BrainDead – 1 episode, 2016
- Shades of Blue – 2 episodes, 2017
- The Defenders – 1 episode, 2017
- SEAL Team – 1 episode, 2017
- The Brave – 1 episode, 2017
- Mayans MC – 1 episode, 2018
- Manifest – 1 episode, 2018
- The Good Fight – 1 episode, 2019
- How to Get Away with Murder – 1 episode, 2019
- Charmed – 1 episode, 2020
- The Lost Symbol – 2 episodes, 2021
- Promised Land – 1 episode, 2022
- 9-1-1: Lone Star – 1 episode, 2023
