= David Zabel =

American television producer and writer

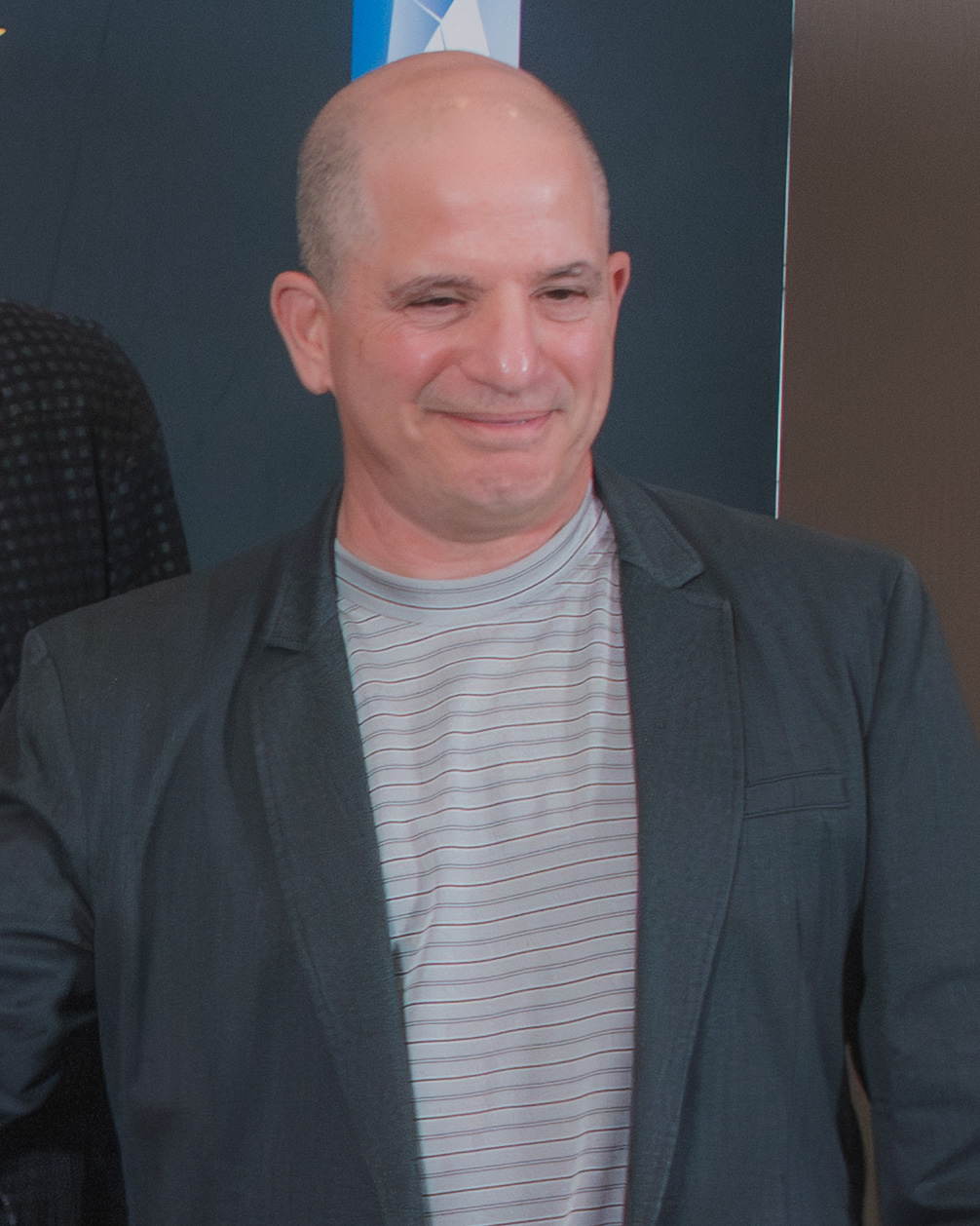
- Zabel in 2026
- Born: David Breitel Zabel; New York City, New York, U.S.
- Education: Princeton University (BA); New York University (MFA)
- Occupations: Television producer, writer
- Father: William D. Zabel

David Breitel Zabel is an American television producer and writer. He has worked extensively on ER, becoming an executive producer and the series' showrunner. He has won a Humanitas Prize for his writing for ER. He was also the showrunner/executive producer of the PBS series Mercy Street.

== Early life ==
Zabel is the son of prominent divorce lawyers Eleanor (Breitel) Alter and William D. Zabel. Zabel was raised in New York City. He attended Princeton University and New York University's Graduate Acting Program at the Tisch School of the Arts.

== Career ==
Zabel began his scriptwriting career with episodes for JAG and Star Trek: Voyager. He then became the story editor for the first season of Dark Angel in 2000 while continuing to write teleplays. In 2001, Zabel joined the crew of ER as an executive story editor and was promoted to co-executive producer later that season. He was made executive producer partway through the tenth season and took on the role of showrunner for the eleventh season. As a credited writer, Zabel contributed to over 45 scripts for ER.

Zabel and R. Scott Gemmill were awarded the Humanitas Prize in the 60 minutes category in 2007 for their script for the season 12 episode "There Are No Angels Here", which followed doctors from the Chicago-set series performing aid work in a refugee camp in Darfur. Humanitas stated that the prize was awarded for the episode's "unflinching look at the brutality inherent in civil wars and its belief that heroism is complex, complicated and multi-layered."

Zabel led the show through the 2007 Writers Guild of America Strike and picketed along with the rest of the writing team. Thirteen episodes were written prior to the strike, and new episodes were written once the strike was resolved, so Zabel was able to deliver a shortened 19 episode season.

Zabel was the showrunner/executive producer of "ER" through the end of its run, after 15 seasons, in 2009. He was nominated for a second Humanitas Prize for writing the episode "Heal Thyself," which he also directed. He was the showrunner of Detroit 1-8-7 in 2010-2011, for which he also wrote and directed numerous episodes.

In 2013, he had two pilots that he wrote and produced go to series on ABC - Lucky 7 (co-written with Jason Richman) and Betrayal. He served as executive producer and showrunner on both shows.

In 2016, the first season of his PBS series Mercy Street aired. The second season was released on January 22, 2017, being cancelled on March 9 of that year.

In 2022, Zabel replaced Angela Kang as showrunner of The Walking Dead: Daryl Dixon, a spin-off series in The Walking Dead franchise. Zabel wrote or co-wrote three episodes in its first season.

== Filmography ==
Year	Title	Notes
1998–1999	JAG	2 episodes
1999	Star Trek: Voyager	"Pathfinder"
2000–2001	Dark Angel	5 episodes
2001–2009	ER	Executive producer 150 episodes; writer 44 episodes
2008	Keith	Feature film
2010–2011	Detroit 1-8-7	Executive producer; writer 6 episodes
2013–2014	Betrayal	Executive producer; writer 13 episodes
2013–2014	Lucky 7	Executive producer; writer 6 episodes
2014	Red Band Society	1 episode
2015	The Adversaries	Television movie
2016–2017	Mercy Street	12 episodes
2019	Stumptown	Executive producer
2023–present	The Walking Dead: Daryl Dixon	Showrunner; writer 11 episodes
