= Laura Innes =

American actress and television director

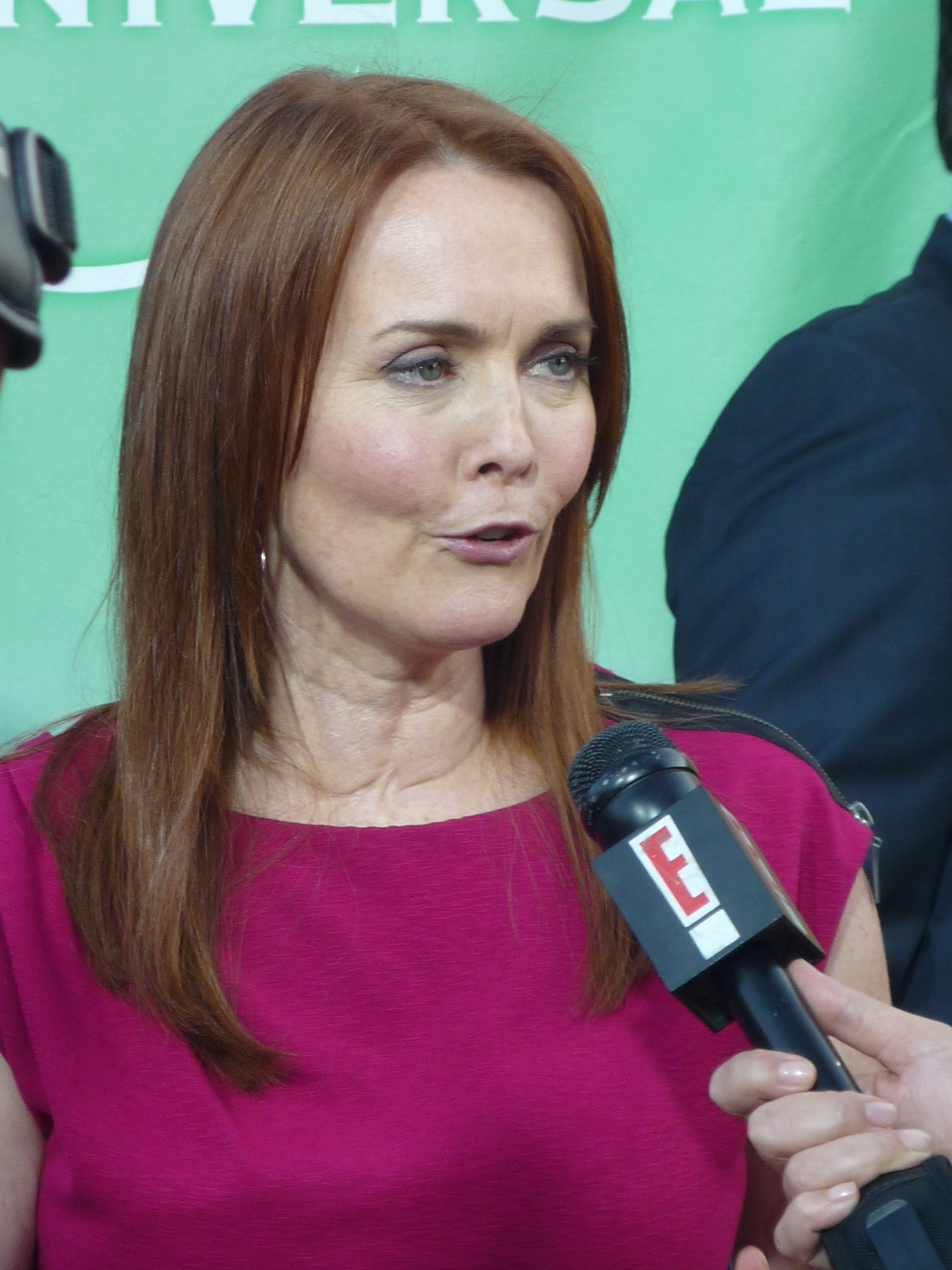
- Innes in 2010
- Born: August 16, 1957 (age 69); Pontiac, Michigan, U.S.
- Education: Northwestern University
- Occupations: Actress; television director
- Years active: 1978–present

Laura Innes (born August 16, 1957) is an American actress and television director. She played Kerry Weaver in the medical drama ER (1995–2009), which earned her two Primetime Emmy Award nominations. In 2001, she received her third Primetime Emmy Award nomination for directing the episode "Shibboleth" of the political drama The West Wing. She also appeared in the thriller drama The Event (2010–2011) and How to Get Away with Murder (2018–2020).

== Career ==
Innes was born in Pontiac, Michigan, and grew up in nearby Birmingham, a suburb of Detroit. She graduated from Northwestern University with a degree in theater.

Innes's stage credits were in Chicago at the Goodman Theatre and Wisdom Bridge Theatre, where she played Stella in A Streetcar Named Desire. John Malkovich played Mitch in this production. Other major stage credits include Two Shakespearean Actors with Eric Stoltz at Lincoln Center, Our Town at the Seattle Repertory Theatre, and Three Sisters at the La Jolla Playhouse in San Diego.

In 1986, Innes co-starred as Krissy Bender Marino, the daughter of Jerry Stiller and Anne Meara in the short-lived sitcom The Stiller and Meara Show. In 1989, Innes played Miss Andrews in the Nickelodeon sitcom Hey Dude in the second season episode "Teacher's Pest". She also played Mrs. Fleeman in the episode "Baby". In the 1990s, Innes guest-starred in television series including Party of Five, My So-Called Life and Brooklyn Bridge and appeared in the Emmy-winning TV movie And the Band Played On before being cast in her first major television role in the NBC sitcom Wings from 1991 to 1993. She played Bunny, the promiscuous ex-wife of Lowell Mather (Thomas Haden Church).

In the fall of 1995, Innes began a recurring role in the second season of the hit NBC medical drama ER, where she was cast as Dr. Kerry Weaver, the skilled chief of the ER with an abrasive exterior and a physical disability. She was added to the main cast in the third season. In 2001, her character came out as gay during the seventh season. She received two Emmy Award nominations for her role, and three Screen Actors Guild Awards with the ER ensemble cast, and has received five nominations for Best Supporting Actress from Viewers For Quality Television. Innes also directed a number of episodes of the series, and episodes of Brothers & Sisters, Studio 60 on the Sunset Strip, House and The West Wing, one of which earned her an Emmy nomination for directing.

In January 2007, Innes left ER in the middle of the thirteenth season. Having appeared in a total of 213 episodes, she is the second longest-serving cast member in the show's history (behind Noah Wyle who appeared in 241 episodes). From 2008 to 2009, Innes returned to ER during its 15th and final season for two episodes including the series finale "And in the End...". Innes' films include the blockbuster science fiction disaster film Deep Impact (1998) and the comedy Can't Stop Dancing (1999) with her former ER co-star Noah Wyle.

On May 7, 2010, NBC announced that Innes would be co-starring in the short-lived science fiction/mystery/action/thriller drama The Event as Sophia, "the leader of a mysterious group of detainees" with Lisa Vidal, who played Kerry Weaver's wife, Sandy Lopez, in the eighth, ninth and tenth seasons of ER. In 2012, she co-starred as Police Captain Tricia Harper in the short-lived NBC fantasy police procedural drama Awake.

== Personal life ==
Innes's first fiancé, actor David Bell, was murdered in December 1980.

In 2006, Innes told the Daily Mirror that ten years of portraying Dr. Weaver's limp had caused her to experience the early stages of actual spinal damage, stating: "the bottom of my spine is starting to curve on one side from 10 years of raising my hip". As a consequence, ER's producers introduced a plot arc in which Weaver's disorder was surgically corrected.

== Charity work ==
Innes is an advocate for the disabled community, using her role as a director to help employ disabled people. She is a supporter of the Performers with Disabilities Committee, which is associated with the Screen Actors Guild.

== Filmography ==
=== Film ===
Year	Title	Role	Notes
1978	The Fury	Jody	
1986	The Stiller and Meara Show	Krissy Bender Marino	TV movie
1989	Jacob Have I Loved	Mrs. Rice	TV movie
1993	Telling Secrets	Angelyn Graham	TV movie
1993	Torch Song	Ronnie	TV movie
1993	And the Band Played On	Hemophiliac Representative	TV movie
1995	See Jane Run	Mrs. Klinger	TV movie
1995	Just Like Dad	Rose	TV movie
1998	Deep Impact	Beth Stanley	
1999	Can't Stop Dancing	Landlady	
1999	The Price of a Broken Heart	Lynn	TV movie
2001	Taking Back Our Town	Pat Melancon	TV movie
2012	Model Minority	Judge Keaton	
2016	The Good Neighbor	Caroline Grainey	
2017	Please Stand By	Ticket Agent #1	

=== Television ===
Year	Title	Role	Notes
1989–1991	Hey Dude	Mrs. Freeman/Miss Andrews	Recurring role, 2 episodes
1991–1993	Wings	Bunny Mather	Recurring role, 4 episodes
1993	Bakersfield P.D.	Darcy Wilks	Episode: "The Imposter"
1994	The Good Life	Actress	Episode: "Maureen's Play"
1994	Party of Five	Liz	Episode: "Homework"
1995	My So-Called Life	Cheryl Fleck	Episode: "Weekend"
1995–2007, 2008–2009	ER	Dr. Kerry Weaver	Series regular, 213 episodes Recurring cast (season 2); Main cast (seasons 3–13, 15); Screen Actors Guild Award for Outstanding Performance by an Ensemble in a Drama Series (1997–99); Nominated—Primetime Emmy Award for Outstanding Supporting Actress in a Drama Series (1997–98); Nominated—Screen Actors Guild Award for Outstanding Performance by an Ensemble in a Drama Series (2000–01); Nominated—Viewers for Quality Television Award for Best Supporting Actress in a Quality Drama Series (1998, 2000); Directed 12 episodes
1996	The Louie Show	Sandy Sincic	Recurring role, 6 episodes
1997	Rugrats	Dr. Brander	Episode: "The Smell of Success"
2010–2011	The Event	Sophia Maguire	Series regular, 21 episodes
2012	Awake	Captain Tricia Harper	Series regular, 9 episodes
2012	Warehouse 13	Emma Jinks	Episode: "Second Chance"
2017–2018	Colony	Karen Brun	Recurring role
2017–2019	Sneaky Pete		Directed four episodes
2017–2019	Mr. Mercedes		Directed three episodes
2018–2020	How to Get Away with Murder	Governor Lynne Birkhead	Recurring role; seasons 5 & 6; eight episodes. Directed eight episodes.
2020	The George Lucas Talk Show	Herself	Stu-D2 1138 on the Binary Sunset Sith (Studio 60 on the Sunset Strip marathon)
2026	Silo	Senator Rosalind Thurman	Series regular, 5 episodes
2026	Law & Order: Special Victims Unit	Sandra Petronella	season 28 episode 6 "Obedience"
