= Nelson McCormick (director) =

Film director, television director, television producer

Nelson McCormick is an American director and producer of film and television.

Some of his television directing credits include NYPD Blue, V.I.P, Alias, House, Third Watch, ER, Prison Break, 24, The Closer, Southland, Nip/Tuck, Body of Proof, The West Wing, Criminal Minds, Daredevil and Lovecraft Country.

He also directed two remakes of 1980s feature films Prom Night (2008),and The Stepfather (2009).

== Filmography ==
Film

- Prom Night (2008)
- The Stepfather (2009)

Television

Year	Title	Director	Executive Producer	Notes
2000–2001	Sheena	Yes	No	2 episodes
2000–2002	V.I.P.	Yes	No	7 episodes
2001–2005	Third Watch	Yes	No	11 episodes
2002	NYPD Blue	Yes	No	Episode "Oedipus Wrecked"
2002	Presidio Med	Yes	No	2 episodes
2002–2006	ER	Yes	No	6 episodes
2002–2003	Alias	Yes	No	2 episodes
2003	CSI: Crime Scene Investigation	Yes	No	Episode "Coming of Rage"
2004–2005	Cold Case	Yes	No	2 episodes
2005	House	Yes	No	Episode "Detox"
2005–2006	The West Wing	Yes	No	2 episodes
2005–2009	CSI: NY	Yes	No	2 episodes
2005	Over There	Yes	Co-Executive	2 episodes
2007–2017	Prison Break	Yes	Yes	5 episodes
2009–2024	Criminal Minds	Yes	No	9 episodes
2015	The Last Ship	Yes	No	Episode "Alone and Unafraid"
2017	24: Legacy	Yes	No	3 episodes
2018	SEAL Team	Yes	No	Episode "Never Say Die"
2018	The Rookie	Yes	No	Episode "The Roundup"
2019–2022	The Good Fight	Yes	Yes	4 episodes
2020	Hunters	Yes	Yes	3 episodes
2021–2022	Evil	Yes	Yes	4 episodes
2024	Law & Order: Organized Crime	Yes	No	Episode "Missing Persons"
2025	FBI	Yes	No	Episode "Manhunt"
2026	NCIS: New York	Yes	No	Episode "True Love"

TV movies

- For Which He Stands (1996)
- Primal Force (1999)
- Where the Truth Lies (1999)
- Operation: Sandman (2000)
- Control Factor (2003)
- Killing Kennedy (2013)
