= Dee Johnson =

American television producer and writer

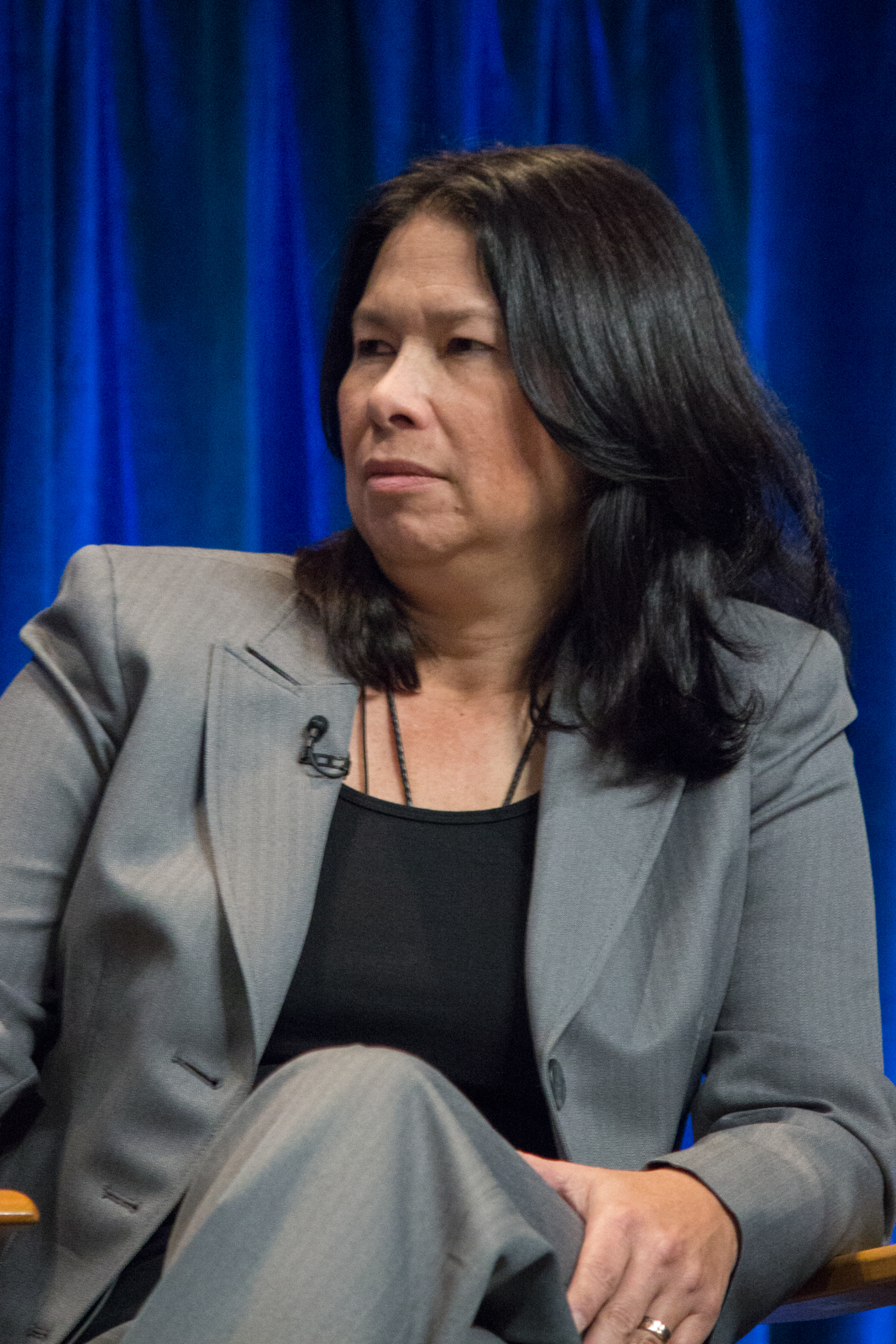
- Johnson at the PaleyFest 2013 panel on the TV show Nashville
- Born: November 17
- Occupations: Television writer and producer

Dee Johnson is an American television producer and writer. She has worked on the series ER, Melrose Place, Commander in Chief, Southland, The Good Wife and was an executive producer and showrunner on Nashville for seasons one through four, exiting after the fourth season. In 2023, Johnson was an executive producer for the Peabody Award-winning miniseries Fellow Travelers. The series won the award for Chronicling LGBTQ+ History Over 50 Years. Her production company is Small Wishes Productions.

== Life and career ==
Johnson began her career as a writer in Fox primetime soap opera Melrose Place. She was one of the major writers of Melrose Place from 1993 to 1995. She was writer of 19 episodes on ER, and also worked in show as co-executive producer. In 2005, Johnson was nominated for Humanitas Prize Award for ER. Her other credits include I'll Fly Away, Profiler, Any Day Now, Army Wives, Southland, Rizzoli & Isles, and The Good Wife.

From 2005 to 2006, Johnson was an executive producer on Commander in Chief, which starred Geena Davis as the United States' first female President. In 2009, she joined the staff of police drama Southland as a writer and consulting producer for the first season. In 2010, she became an executive producer for the legal drama The Good Wife. In 2012, she was an executive producer for 10 episodes of second season on Boss, and took part by writing two episodes. She was later called in to work as showrunner and executive producer on ABC drama Nashville starring Connie Britton and Hayden Panettiere. For her work on Nashville and The Good Wife, Johnson was nominated for Writers Guild of America Award.
