= ER season 11 =

ER
- Season 11
- DVD cover
- Starring: Noah Wyle; Maura Tierney; Mekhi Phifer; Alex Kingston; Goran Visnjic; Sherry Stringfield; Ming-Na; Parminder Nagra; Linda Cardellini; Shane West; Laura Innes
- No. of episodes: 22

Release
- Original network: NBC
- Original release: September 23, 2004 – May 19, 2005

Season chronology
- ← Previous; Season 10 Next → Season 12

The eleventh season of the American fictional drama television series ER first aired on NBC on September 23, 2004, and concluded on May 19, 2005. The eleventh season consists of 22 episodes.

== Plot ==
Several long term characters exit the series including Corday who quits after performing an illegal operation, Chen leaves to care for her ailing father, and Carter also departs the ER to return to Africa with Kem. Elsewhere Lewis is promoted to ER Chief, Abby and Neela begin their internships along with newcomer Ray Barnett, Carter and Lewis compete for tenure, Weaver finally meets her biological mother, Kovač and Sam's relationship deteriorates and Gallant makes an unexpected return from Iraq.

== Cast ==
=== Main cast ===
- Noah Wyle as Dr. John Carter – Attending Emergency Physician
- Maura Tierney as Dr. Abby Lockhart – ER Intern (First-year Resident)
- Mekhi Phifer as Dr. Greg Pratt – Third-year ER Resident
- Alex Kingston as Dr. Elizabeth Corday – Chief of Surgery (episodes 1–4)
- Goran Visnjic as Dr. Luka Kovač – Attending Emergency Physician
- Sherry Stringfield as Dr. Susan Lewis – Chief of Emergency Medicine
- Ming-Na as Dr. Jing-Mei Chen – Attending Physician (episodes 1–9)
- Parminder Nagra as Dr. Neela Rasgotra – ER Intern (First-year Resident)
- Linda Cardellini as Nurse Samantha Taggart – ER RN
- Shane West as Dr. Ray Barnett – ER Intern (First-year Resident)
- Laura Innes as Dr. Kerry Weaver – Chief of Staff

=== Supporting cast ===
Doctors and medical students

- Sam Anderson as Dr. Jack Kayson – Chief of Cardiology
- John Aylward as Dr. Donald Anspaugh – Surgeon and Hospital Board Member
- Leland Orser as Dr. Lucien Dubenko – Attending Surgeon, later Chief of Surgery
- Scott Grimes as Dr. Archie Morris – Resident PGY-3
- Sara Gilbert as Jane Figler – Fourth-year Medical Student
- Eion Bailey as Jake Scanlon – Medical Student
- Lou Richards as Dr. Perkins
- Francesco Quinn as Dr. Alfonso Ramírez
- Andy Powers as Dr. Howard Ritzke
- Norbert Weisser as Dr. Adler
- Anthony Giangrande as Dr. Jeremy Munson – Intern PGY-1
- Michael Spellman as Dr. Jim Babinski – Intern PGY-1
- Giovannie Espiritu as Ludlow – Medical Student
- Tim Russ as Dr. Medford

Nurses

- Deezer D as Nurse Malik McGrath
- Laura Cerón as Nurse Chuny Márquez
- Yvette Freeman as Nurse Haleh Adams
- Lily Mariye as Nurse Lily Jarvik
- Dinah Lenney as Nurse Shirley
- Bellina Logan as Nurse Kit
- Kyle Richards as Nurse Dori Kerns
- Liza Del Mundo as Nurse Severa
- Sumalee Montano as Nurse Duvata Mahal
- Nadia Shazana as OR Nurse Jacy
- Tane Kawasaki as Nurse Claire
- Mary Heiss as Nurse Mary

Staff, paramedics and officers

- Abraham Benrubi as Desk Clerk Jerry Markovic
- Mädchen Amick as Social Worker Wendall Meade
- Troy Evans as Desk Clerk Frank Martin
- Pamela Sinha as Desk Clerk Amira
- Jordan Calloway as Hospital Volunteer K.J. Thibeaux
- China Shavers as Olivia Evans from Ceasefire
- Emily Wagner as Paramedic Doris Pickman
- Montae Russell as Paramedic Dwight Zadro
- Lyn Alicia Henderson as Paramedic Pamela Olbes
- Brian Lester as Paramedic Brian Dumar
- Michelle Bonilla as Paramedic Christine Harms
- Demetrius Navarro as Paramedic Morales
- Louie Liberti as Paramedic Bardelli
- Meg Thalken as Chopper EMT Dee McManus
- Chad McKnight as Officer Wilson

Family

- Thandie Newton as Makemba "Kem" Likasu
- Henry O as Mr. Chen
- Renee Victor as Florina Lopez
- José Zúñiga as Eduardo Lopez
- Donal Logue as (Flight Nurse) Chuck Martin
- Oliver Davis as Alex Taggart
- Garret Dillahunt as Steve Curtis
- Anupam Kher as Ajay Rasgotra
- Kiron Kher as Mrs. Rasgotra
- Frances Fisher as Helen Kingsley
- Danny Glover as Charlie Pratt
- Sam Jones III as Chaz Pratt
- Hassan Johnson as Darnell Thibeaux

=== Guest stars ===
- Sharif Atkins as Dr. Michael Gallant
- Ray Liotta as Charlie Metcalf
- Dan Hedaya as Herb Spivak
- Chad Lowe as Dr. George Henry
- Cynthia Nixon as Ellie Shore
- Louise Fletcher as Roberta 'Birdie' Chadwick
- Red Buttons as Jules Rubadoux
- Josh Gad as Sgt. Bruce Larabee
- Glenn Morshower as Rick Decoyte
- Randall Park as Yong-Jo Pak
- Marla Gibbs as Cherise Barnes
- Pat Carroll as Rebecca Chadwick

== Production ==
Former executive producer Lydia Woodward returns as a consultant producer and writer.

== Episodes ==
No. overall	No. in season	Title	Directed by	Written by	Original release date	Prod. code	US viewers (millions)
224	1	"One for the Road"	Christopher Chulack	Joe Sachs	September 23, 2004	177851	19.69
Pratt, Chen, and Elgin are rescued after crashing into the Chicago River. Elgin dies but both Pratt and Chen require surgery to survive. Kovač attempts to persuade Sam to return to County after receiving a phone call from Sam's son Alex during their trip to Louisville. Three new interns, including Abby and Ray Barnett, arrive at County. Carter and Kem say goodbye to their son and Kem leaves Chicago. After doing a brief shift as a nurse to help with Pratt, Chen and Elgin's absence, Abby starts her career as a doctor by dealing with a drug-smuggling patient, ultimately convincing the girl to give up the drugs on her own rather than undergo a far more invasive cavity search. Abby also treats a man with recurring tonsil cancer who starts bleeding from the mouth. Tired of his endless fight, the man decides to let himself bleed out rather than be treated and have to face more problems down the line; he ultimately bleeds out, using suction to keep from drowning in his blood at the same time. NOTE: First appearance of Dr. Ray Barnett.
225	2	"Damaged"	Paul McCrane	David Zabel	October 7, 2004	177852	17.06
Carter suffers with insomnia and depression over his separation from Kem and crosses some lines while treating an injured Iraq War veteran. Abby deals with resentful nurses while trying to follow Weaver's advice while tending to a young woman kidnapped and forced into sexual slavery. Then a gay-bashing crime unites the medical team behind her. Kovač makes an honest confession to a returning Sam. Neela gets a surprise visit but little support from her domineering, old-school parents and fails in her attempt to get a job at County.
226	3	"Try Carter"	Jonathan Kaplan	R. Scott Gemmill	October 14, 2004	177853	16.80
Corday angrily confronts Weaver on the hiring of Dr. Dubenko as County reels under the weight of a busy 4th of July caseload, and Carter then convinces Corday to perform an illegal transplant operation between two HIV+ men. Abby and Ray argue on the course of treatment of an altered bicycle messenger. Abby notices problems with fellow intern Howard. Neela looks for employment without much success before taking a job far below her expectations. Carter discovers Ray's unusual living conditions.
227	4	"Fear"	Lesli Linka Glatter	Dee Johnson	October 21, 2004	177854	16.11
Two small children are rushed to the ER after falling from a third story window, allegedly escaping their mother's violent, abusive ex-husband; however, additional facts reveal a different cause. Corday is disciplined over her illegal surgery, and instead of taking a non-tenure track position, she decides to call it quits and return to England. Howard resigns his position after Abby tries to discuss his OCD. Lewis takes the vacant ER chief position and offers Neela an ER internship at County. NOTE: Final regular appearance of Dr. Elizabeth Corday.
228	5	"An Intern's Guide to the Galaxy"	Arthur Albert	Lisa Zwerling	November 4, 2004	177855	17.01
It is Neela's first day back at the ER and Pratt expects the interns to take a large patient load during their shifts, tracking their output. Neela struggles with frustration as she trails in the competition and is asked rude personal questions by a medical student named Jane Figler (Sara Gilbert) while trying to help a patient with severe leukemia. Ray leads by a landslide but makes a major mistake by greenlighting organ donation against the family's wishes after he speeds through the paperwork and is reprimanded by Carter. Not interested in the competition, Abby fakes a needle prick in order to get HIV-protective medication for a worried patient- and deals with a med student who is smitten with her. Carter asks new social worker Wendall Meade to walk out with him.
229	6	"Time of Death"	Christopher Chulack	David Zabel	November 11, 2004	177856	19.83
Kovač, Abby, Pratt, and Sam try to save the life of an ex-con and alcoholic named Charlie Metcalf (Ray Liotta), who might be living his final minutes due to cirrhosis-related illnesses. Charlie tries to make amends with his son, whom he has not seen since being released from prison, with Sam's help. Pratt is angry about the effort and expense of treating Charlie until Kovač makes him confront his feelings about his own absent father. Ultimately, Charlie opts to cease treatment and await his death. The entire episode consists of this one plot line and takes place in real time.
230	7	"White Guy, Dark Hair"	Nelson McCormick	Lydia Woodward	November 18, 2004	177857	18.90
Kovač and Sam treat a critically injured woman who has been brutally beaten and raped by a serial predator. Wanting to help police identify the perpetrator, Sam gets the woman's consent for a risky procedure to help the woman speak, but it backfires and leads to her death. Lewis schedules a JCAHO emergency drill without telling the staff, creating chaos. Carter crosses the line when he treats a teenage girl denying her newly born baby, as his pain from his son's death is evident to all.
231	8	"A Shot in the Dark"	Jonathan Kaplan	Joe Sachs	December 2, 2004	177858	17.67
Lewis, Neela, and Ray treat a police officer shot during a robbery. His 15-year-old son must make a difficult decision on his father's course of treatment and he turns to Ray for advice. Ray promises to help the boy explain his decision to his mother, but he instead leaves for a gig and later gets an angry earful from Neela after the boy is browbeaten into changing his mind. Abby and Dubenko help a young girl whose mother does not want her to have critical surgery at County, but her condition worsens before her transfer can go through. Carter and Wendall have their first date, for a casual dinner. Pratt finds out that Chen's father's condition is deteriorating.
232	9	"Twas the Night"	Julie Hébert	Julie Hébert	December 9, 2004	177859	18.21
It is Christmas Eve in the ER, and the hospital is overrun by homeless people trying to stay warm. When Chen can't find someone to cover her shift, she quits, leaving Carter as the only ER attending. Carter and an off-duty Ray save a critically injured boy, and Ray learns the real story of his injury from his little sister. Abby and new medical student Jake treat a dialysis patient who is in critical condition, but when she can't reach his attending, she breaks the rules to save the patient's life. Pratt heads to Chen's house and finds she is about to euthanize her father, who has begged her to do so in his lucid moments and then take his body back to China. Neela and Abby, with Wendall's help, arrange for presents for the homeless children in County. NOTE: Final appearance of Dr. Jing-Mei "Deb" Chen.
233	10	"Skin"	Stephen Cragg	Dee Johnson	January 13, 2005	177860	18.42
While on a smoke break, Abby is kidnapped at gunpoint by two gang members and ordered to save their wounded leader. After much effort, she fails but, instead of being executed as she expects, they return her to the hospital. Ray begins treatment on a woman who soon requests a new doctor because she recognizes he is not comfortable being himself. Lewis has a difficult time coping with the stressful parts of her administrative position, such as low patient satisfaction scores, and succeeds in alienating everyone before receiving some advice from Weaver. Kovač tries to build Neela's confidence by praising her technical skills.
234	11	"Only Connect"	Jonathan Kaplan	Yahlin Chang	January 20, 2005	177861	18.82
Lewis assigns Kovač to teach the residents how to communicate more effectively with their patients. The effort fizzles when Pratt and Neela direct the families of two unidentified teenagers, who were brought to the ER with gunshot wounds and had different outcomes, to the wrong people, and the only person aware of the confusion is medical student Jane, who is ignored. Lawyer Herb Spivak shows up at the ER and tries to generate lawsuits against County until he ends up a patient himself. Pratt continues to dazzle everyone with his medical skills but struggles with his teaching role. Abby returns to work while still recovering from her post-abduction trauma, but med student Jake helps her overcome it.
235	12	"The Providers"	Christopher Chulack	David Zabel	January 27, 2005	177862	19.75
Carter treats a 16-year-old girl with kidney failure after taking a new drug to control her seizures. Carter's old medical student, George Henry, is the girl's doctor and is a paid consultant to the manufacturer. When things get worse, the father commits suicide so that he can give his daughter his remaining kidney. Carter's search for information about the drug's side effects and subsequent public comments may lead the drug manufacturer to withdraw grants from County, which enrages Weaver and could hurt Lewis' aspirations for tenure.
236	13	"Middleman"	Ernest Dickerson	Lisa Zwerling	February 3, 2005	177863	18.09
Kovač and Pratt examine a man who was shot after he confronted his boss with a gun. Kovač and Dubenko disagree about possible internal injuries, leading Kovač to try several procedures to test his theory. Ultimately Kovač is proven correct, while the patient refers to the day as the best of his life. Pratt also treats a boy with a suspicious gash but releases him despite Wendall's objections, with tragic results. Jake tries to convince Abby that they should date and changes shifts with Jane so that Abby is no longer his supervisor.
237	14	"Just as I Am"	Richard Thorpe	Lydia Woodward	February 10, 2005	177864	17.08
Weaver treats an evasive patient (Frances Fisher), who reveals that she is Weaver's birth mother. As they spend time together, Weaver learns the story of her birth (when her mother was 15) and that her mother was unaware of her birth defect (which is why she needs a crutch). However, when Weaver reveals to her mother – an evangelical Christian – that she is gay, their meeting turns rocky. Abby and Jake adjust to their changed relationship. Jane impresses Pratt when she shows him she can handle an agitated patient.
238	15	"Alone in a Crowd"	Jonathan Kaplan	Dee Johnson	February 17, 2005	177865	17.74
When a young mother of three (Cynthia Nixon) has a paralyzing stroke, Kovač and Sam race to save her. After learning that a controversial surgical procedure is his wife's only chance of a full recovery, her husband must decide whether to risk her life in order to save the quality of her life. Pratt confronts Morris about his stupid behavior and impresses Lewis, but then surprises her by saying he is not interested in becoming Chief Resident. Dubenko casually pursues Abby with an offer to co-write an article. As Carter and Wendall's relationship deepens, an overnight phone call from Kem reveals its limitations, and Wendall walks away.
239	16	"Here and There"	Christopher Chulack	David Zabel	February 24, 2005	177866	16.03
The focus is the contrast and similarities between Neela's life at County and Gallant's with a CSH in Iraq. A young girl in Iraq is severely burned in an RPG attack just outside the CSH and local hospitals are unequipped to help, so Gallant enlists Neela's help to secure the needed treatment at County. However, getting the girl to the United States proves to be more difficult than expected. Due to her loneliness, Neela nearly sleeps with one of Ray's band members (Misha Collins) before drawing away.
240	17	"Back in the World"	Jonathan Kaplan	David Zabel & Lisa Zwerling	March 24, 2005	177867	15.01
Neela is surprised when she hears that Gallant came to the ER with the young Iraqi burn patient, but they later connect on a personal level. Sam's ex-husband Steve visits, and desk clerk Frank learns that he has been in prison in Colorado. Steve loots Sam and Kovač's apartment, but Kovač blocks him from leaving with Alex. Pratt treats a child whose gun went off in his pocket and learns that he received the gun from his mother while being attracted to a young woman who runs an anti-violence program.
241	18	"Refusal of Care"	Gloria Muzio	Joe Sachs	April 21, 2005	177868	16.05
Lewis, Neela, and Sam are legally blocked from treating a woman dying from the effects of a hunger strike designed to prevent her son from being deported, but when her son is brought in by INS to talk to her, he shows no concern for her at all. Abby believes but is unable to prove that an injured 72-year-old woman is the survivor of elder abuse, and she and her sister are released to resume panhandling. Pratt struggles to find a way to convince a woman with breast cancer to seek treatment.
242	19	"Ruby Redux"	Paul McCrane	Lisa Zwerling & Lydia Woodward	April 28, 2005	177869	14.52
85-year-old Jules Rubadoux (Red Buttons) is brought in and accuses Carter of killing his wife ten years ago when he was a medical student and had her moved to a different facility at the end of a research study. Although Abby believes Rubadoux is too old and frail to undertake surgery to correct a heart murmur, the attending doctors (including Anspaugh) opt to go ahead with the operation, and Carter has to decide whether to try to convince Rubadoux otherwise despite their history. Also, Morris may end up with the chief resident job despite a disastrous presentation, Ray angers Carter when he does not follow procedures when the elderly panhandlers show up in the ER again, Lewis does her presentation for tenure, and Sam takes a home pregnancy test.
243	20	"You Are Here"	Ernest Dickerson	Karen Maser & Dee Johnson	May 5, 2005	177870	15.66
Morris has been appointed the new chief resident and immediately locks horns with Pratt as they deal with the casualties from a fire at an apartment building. Carter, whose family foundation is starting to build a new health care center for the hospital, receives tenure, while Lewis does not (for bringing in too few grants), and Lewis takes out her frustration from not earning tenure on him and on Ray, who is secretly helping a sexually abused teenager. Kovač finds Sam's negative pregnancy test, and they jointly lament their lack of communication skills. Abby has a fairly enjoyable day at a Catholic ceremony with Jake's family.
244	21	"Carter est Amoureux"	Christopher Chulack	John Wells	May 12, 2005	177871	17.16
After hearing that her mother is sick, Carter flies to Paris to see Kem. While there, he offers to move back to Africa to start all over. Abby, Ray, and Neela all make medical mistakes. While in counseling, Sam reveals that she thinks that she and Kovač should not be together. Abby makes it clear that she and Jake do not have a future together.
245	22	"The Show Must Go On"	John Wells	David Zabel	May 19, 2005	177872	18.76
It is Carter's last shift in the ER. Kovač and most of the ER staff take Carter on a surprise goodbye party. Meanwhile, Ray and Morris attend their own party that soon is interrupted by disaster; the doctors treat the injured at County where Abby, Neela, and Ray must step up to the challenge all on their own. Also, Sam learns that her son Alex has run away. NOTE: Final regular appearance of Dr. John Carter.
