= ER season 12 =

ER
- Season 12
- DVD cover
- Starring: Goran Visnjic; Maura Tierney; Mekhi Phifer; Sherry Stringfield; Parminder Nagra; Linda Cardellini; Shane West; Scott Grimes; Laura Innes
- No. of episodes: 22

Release
- Original network: NBC
- Original release: September 22, 2005 – May 18, 2006

Season chronology
- ← Previous; Season 11 Next → Season 13

The twelfth season of the American fictional drama television series ER first aired on NBC on September 22, 2005, and concluded on May 18, 2006. It consists of 22 episodes.

== Plot ==
Kovač and Abby become the main central characters and their relationship slowly starts to get back on track as they deal with her unexpected pregnancy. A new nurse manager causes friction among the staff; following a successful operation, Weaver no longer needs her cane. Pratt journeys to Africa to join Carter on a relief mission, while a face from Sam’s past leaves Abby and Kovač’s lives hanging in the balance. In addition to Darfur, geopolitics of the day get a strong spotlight due to the Iraq War.

== Cast ==
=== Changes ===
Following Sherry Stringfield's departure in the season premiere, this season becomes the first to not feature any of the original cast members in a regular capacity (Noah Wyle is featured for four episodes in a recurring capacity throughout the season).

=== Main cast ===
- Goran Visnjic as Dr. Luka Kovač, Attending Physician/Chief of Emergency Medicine
- Maura Tierney as Dr. Abby Lockhart, Second-year ER Resident
- Mekhi Phifer as Dr. Greg Pratt, Fourth-year ER Resident
- Sherry Stringfield as Dr. Susan Lewis, Chief of Emergency Medicine (episode 1)
- Parminder Nagra as Dr. Neela Rasgotra, Second-year ER Resident
- Linda Cardellini as Nurse Samantha Taggart
- Shane West as Dr. Ray Barnett, Second-year ER Resident
- Scott Grimes as Dr. Archie Morris, Chief Resident
- Laura Innes as Dr. Kerry Weaver, Chief of Staff

=== Supporting ===
Doctors and medical students

- John Leguizamo as Dr. Victor Clemente, Attending Physician
- Amy Aquino as Dr. Janet Coburn, Chief of Obstetrics and Gynecology
- John Aylward as Dr. Donald Anspaugh, Surgical Attending Physician and Hospital Board Member
- Leland Orser as Dr. Lucien Dubenko, Chief of Surgery
- Sara Gilbert as Dr. Jane Figler, ER Intern
- Michael Buchman Silver as Dr. Paul Myers, Psychiatrist
- Maury Sterling as Dr. Nelson, Psychiatrist
- Dahlia Salem as Dr. Jessica Albright, Surgical Chief Resident
- Anthony Giangrande as Dr. Jeremy Munson, ER Intern
- Michael Spellman as Dr. Jim Babinski, ER Intern
- Kim Strauss as Dr. Ari, Anesthesiologist
- Britain Spellings as Dr. Sackowitz
- Corey Stoll as Dr. Teddy Marsh, Intern
- Damali Scott as Dr. Lana Clemons, Intern
- Christopher Grove as Dr. Marty Kline

Nurses

- Kristen Johnston as Nurse Manager Eve Peyton
- Deezer D as Nurse Malik McGrath
- Laura Cerón as Nurse Chuny Marquez
- Yvette Freeman as Nurse Haleh Adams
- Lily Mariye as Nurse Lily Jarvik
- Dinah Lenney as Nurse Shirley
- April Lee Hernandez as Nurse Inez
- Kyle Richards as Nurse Dori Kerns
- Nadia Shazana as OR Nurse Jacy
- Cynthia Cervini as Nurse Anna Waldron

Staff, paramedics and officers

- Abraham Benrubi as Desk Clerk Jerry Markovic
- Troy Evans as Desk Clerk Frank Martin
- Tara Karsian as Social Worker Liz Dade
- Jordan Calloway as Hospital Volunteer K.J. Thibeaux
- China Shavers as Olivia Evans from Ceasefire
- John Stamos as Paramedic Tony Gates
- Emily Wagner as Paramedic Doris Pickman
- Montae Russell as Paramedic Dwight Zadro
- Lyn Alicia Henderson as Paramedic Pamela Olbes
- Brian Lester as Paramedic Brian Dumar
- Michelle Bonilla as Paramedic Christine Harms
- Demetrius Navarro as Paramedic Morales
- Louie Liberti as Paramedic Bardelli
- Christopher Amitrano as Officer Hollis
- Bobby Nish as Officer Danny Yau
- Eddie Smith as Officer Jones
- Mary Kennedy as Officer Trudy Lange
- Louis Iacoviello as Officer Rovner

Family

- Dominic Janes as Alex Taggart
- Garret Dillahunt as Steve Curtis
- Danny Glover as Charlie Pratt
- Sam Jones III as Chaz Pratt
- Tina Lifford as Evelyn Pratt
- Cecily Lewis as Jocelyn Pratt
- Ernie Hudson as Colonel James Gallant
- Sheryl Lee Ralph as Gloria Gallant
- Hassan Johnson as Darnell Thibeaux

=== Guest stars ===
- Noah Wyle as Dr. John Carter
- Sharif Atkins as Dr. Michael Gallant
- Mary McCormack as Debbie
- Eamonn Walker as Dr. Steven Dakarai
- Kat Dennings as Zoe Butler
- Serena Williams as Alice Watson
- Stana Katic as Blaire Collins
- James Woods as Dr. Nate Lennox
- Armand Assante as Richard Elliott
- C. Thomas Howell as Vincent Janeson
- Suzanne Cryer as Toni Stillman
- Rochelle Aytes as Tamara
- Shea Whigham as Bobby Kenyon
- Callie Thorne as Jodie Kenyon
- Danny Pudi as Mahir Kardatay
- Shohreh Aghdashloo as Riza Kardatay

== Episodes ==
No. overall	No. in season	Title	Directed by	Written by	Original release date	Prod. code	US viewers (millions)
246	1	"Cañon City"	Christopher Chulack	Lisa Zwerling, John Wells & Joe Sachs	September 22, 2005	2T6051	14.37
Kovač and Sam report Alex missing to the police and suspect that he is trying to find his father. They are especially worried because Alex is diabetic and he has forgotten his insulin. Meanwhile, Lewis and Pratt guide the new R2s on managing their new interns while the irresponsible Morris takes a nap; Ray and Neela back up the board due to poor communication, while Abby shines at managing but fails to properly teach. NOTE: Final regular appearance of Dr. Susan Lewis.
247	2	"Nobody's Baby"	Laura Innes	R. Scott Gemmill	September 29, 2005	2T6052	14.44
Ray attends to a surrogate mother who goes into labor prematurely after being involved in a car accident. A difficult decision must be made as the baby's life hangs in the balance. Pratt gets a visit from his estranged father Charlie (Danny Glover). A depressed Kovač copes with another failed relationship when Sam announces she's moving out, but he gets emotional support from Abby, who joins forces with Neela to put a spoiled, rude patient in her place.
248	3	"Man with No Name"	Christopher Chulack	David Zabel	October 6, 2005	2T6053	14.15
It is a bad day for Kovač as he and Sam can not be civil after their disruptive break up, and a new nurse manager, Eve Peyton, enforces her strict and efficient new procedures. Abby treats a rollerblading single patient with an increased risk for breast cancer due to mutations in her BRCA1 gene, who is struggling with the need for a mastectomy, and Abby makes a discovery about Dubenko's own health while visiting oncology. Dr. Weaver mentions that Dr. Lewis is interviewing for a tenured position and won't be in. Neela prepares a care package for Gallant. After Luka and Sam reach a tentative peace, he gets drunk at a bar and Abby gives him a ride home.
249	4	"Blame It on the Rain"	Paul McCrane	R. Scott Gemmill	October 13, 2005	2T6054	13.61
In the wake of heavy rains, the ER is flooded with diverse patients, including a baby involved in a suspicious car crash with her mother and a heart-attack patient visited by his "satisfaction facilitator" (a hired escort). Sam confronts Eve about her strict ways. Abby learns the details of Dubenko's condition and tactfully refuses his advances. Kovač protests when nursing home workers drop off Blaire Collins (Stana Katic), who has been comatose for six years, for routine care, but later in the day, she unexpectedly regains consciousness.
250	5	"Wake Up"	Arthur Albert	Janine Sherman Barrois	October 20, 2005	2T6055	14.70
Kovač bonds with Blaire, who has no memory of the carjacking and rape-murder incident that caused her coma, while her drug therapy becomes an issue. In the wake of Lewis' sudden departure, new attending physician Victor Clemente arrives to help make the ER more efficient, but the residents are not too fond of him, despite his wide-ranging knowledge. Abby's breast cancer patient convinces her to take a long-delayed exam. Ray begins a sexual relationship with a young woman named Zoe Butler (Kat Dennings).
251	6	"Dream House"	Stephen Cragg	David Zabel	November 3, 2005	2T6056	14.29
Clemente, Abby, and Neela secretly care for an infant chimpanzee. Eve promotes Sam and assigns her a dreadful task: she must fire a beloved and long-time nurse, Haleh. Pratt reaches a decision about his relationship with his estranged father and learns the truth about his father's abandonment of him. Ray discovers Zoe has chlamydia and that she's underage.
252	7	"The Human Shield"	Laura Innes	R. Scott Gemmill	November 10, 2005	2T6057	15.44
The treatment options for a 10-year-old victim of a shooting- who has already been abducted and sexually abused for months- sparks a furious argument between Kovač and Clemente, which Abby becomes stuck in the middle of. Paramedic Tony Gates flirts with Neela, who is awaiting Gallant's arrival, which is unexpectedly delayed. When the little girl dies, Abby takes out her grief and frustration on Kovač and they kiss. Ray is confronted and beaten by Zoe's father. NOTE: First appearance of paramedic and medical student Tony Gates.
253	8	"Two Ships"	Christopher Chulack	Joe Sachs & Virgil Williams	November 17, 2005	2T6058	15.30
Kovač and Abby wake up together, but decide to remain friends. The ER prepares to take in victims of a plane crash into an apartment building, while Neela (still doing her mandatory paramedic stint) and Pratt head out to the crash site because Pratt doesn't trust Ray in the field. Neela distinguishes herself with a field surgery and a rescue, impressing Dubenko. Sam re-hires Haleh when the ER runs short on nurses due to a training session. Neela gets a surprising visit.
254	9	"I Do"	Gloria Muzio	Lydia Woodward	December 1, 2005	2T6060	15.44
Back from Iraq, Gallant surprises Neela by impulsively asking her to marry him. Morris stands up to Weaver on a patient's course of treatment, and Weaver decides she needs to fix up her own life. An HIV+ mother, who does not believe in the virus, is putting her infected son at risk and enraging Clemente, but it is Sam who is able to help the situation. Kovač and Clemente continue their ongoing rivalry as they vie for the same job, which Kovač eventually gets. Neela and Gallant marry, and Kovač and Abby realize they want more than just friendship.
255	10	"All About Christmas Eve"	Lesli Linka Glatter	Janine Sherman Barrois	December 8, 2005	2T6059	15.34
Kovač arrives for his first day as Chief of Emergency Medicine wearing a Santa hat, with presents for everyone. Pratt and Weaver try to make a Christmas miracle happen for a young girl whose life hangs in the balance after two gang members randomly shoot her. Haleh holds her annual choir tryouts, Eve crosses the line with a disruptive patient and pays for it, Clemente gets a visit from Jodie (Callie Thorne), a past lover. Abby has a surprise for Kovač: she's pregnant.
256	11	"If Not Now"	John Gallagher	David Zabel	January 5, 2006	2T6061	13.97
Abby and Kovač agonize over what to do about her unexpected pregnancy, with Abby eventually deciding to keep the baby despite her fears that it might be bipolar like her mother and brother. Neela and Kovač help a religious teenager weigh all her pregnancy options, but differ on what course she should take. Clemente's past is starting to catch up with him as police visit to investigate a missing person report on Jodie. Weaver falls on the ice and realizes she needs surgery.
257	12	"Split Decisions"	Richard Thorpe	R. Scott Gemmill	January 12, 2006	2T6062	15.40
With Abby now expecting, she and Kovač venture out for some baby shopping. Ray helps Zoe escape from her abusive father, and Dubenko volunteers to take on the dayshift but is overwhelmed. Pratt falsifies a blood test to help a friend avoid a drunk-driving arrest, and Neela gets unexpected and unwelcome news from Gallant.
258	13	"Body & Soul"	Paul McCrane	Joe Sachs	February 2, 2006	2T6064	13.76
Dr. Nate Lennox (James Woods), a former professor and mentor of Abby's, is brought into the ER in the last stages of ALS disease. In a series of flashbacks at County, the progression of his illness over the last six years is shown. He wants to give up, but Abby is determined to give him the strength to keep fighting.
259	14	"Quintessence of Dust"	Joanna Kerns	Lisa Zwerling & David Zabel	February 9, 2006	2T6065	14.16
An unexpected visitor – Jodie's violent policeman husband Bobby (Shea Whigham), from whom she has filed for divorce – puts Clemente in the middle of a domestic dispute that ends in Bobby shooting Jodie and Clemente. Kovač and Abby await important test results regarding their baby. Neela struggles with her surgical elective, and Ray tries to convince a homeless musician to accept help from his family. Jodie survives life-threatening surgery but is comatose, and her out-of-context remarks lead to Clemente being suspected in her shooting.
260	15	"Darfur"	Richard Thorpe	Janine Sherman Barrois	March 2, 2006	2T6063	12.90
Carter works in the Sudanese desert, helping treat hundreds of diseased people including a woman raped by a militant group. Back in the ER, the police accuse Clemente of shooting Jodie. Pratt and Neela work to save a 14-year-old involved in a hit-and-run accident, but Pratt is infuriated when he discovers who hit the young teen. Kovač refuses to let Clemente return to work until he is reviewed by the Impaired Physician Committee. Jodie awakens from her coma and tells the police about her shooting, and Bobby threatens Clemente's life.
261	16	"Out on a Limb"	Lesli Linka Glatter	Karen Maser	March 16, 2006	2T6066	13.98
Weaver must make a difficult choice about having hip replacement surgery when the pain interferes with her work, ultimately deciding to go forward with it, and asks Abby to take care of Henry if something goes wrong. When Abby discovers that one of her patients has contracted meningococcemia, the E.R. is briefly quarantined. Sam treats a man who collapsed, Richard Elliott (Armand Assante), who offers her an intriguing job she might not be able to refuse. Meanwhile, Neela decides to attend a support group for military spouses but when she offers her skeptical view of the war, the meeting turns into a debate. Pratt confesses to Kovač that he falsified a blood test; an infuriated Kovač suspends him for five days while deciding his fate.
262	17	"Lost in America"	Stephen Cragg	Lisa Zwerling	March 23, 2006	2T6067	13.53
Kovač, with Abby's help, works feverishly to save a young Turkish woman with multiple stab wounds. Kovač and the woman's mother connect as she shares her experiences from her former life in Turkey. As the girl's condition worsens, Clemente steps in and decides to try a risky procedure; surprisingly, he and Kovač work together effectively for the first time. Sam accepts a part-time job working for Richard Elliott. Neela pulls an all-nighter in preparation for a speech at a surgeon's convention but is disappointed when her speech goes awry. Morris' past catches up with him.
263	18	"Strange Bedfellows"	Laura Innes	Virgil Williams	March 30, 2006	2T6068	12.78
A case involving two teens injured in a car accident proves baffling as the doctors try to determine why the girl is unconscious and why her male companion is so hostile toward the police, before Ray discovers the problem: he's deaf, and the cops (not understanding his sign language) jumped him. Neela copes with a visit from Gallant's bickering parents and Morris gets a tempting job offer from a pharmaceutical company. Olivia learns of Pratt's philandering. Kovač tells Abby that Carter has asked him to join him in Darfur, but when he realizes Abby is worried, he tells Pratt to go and responds to Pratt's protests by saying it's not a request but a do this work-or-you're fired order. Sam enjoys the perks of working for Elliott. Ray struggles with some unresolved feelings for Neela as she decides to move back to Abby's apartment.
264	19	"No Place to Hide"	Skipp Sudduth	Lydia Woodward	April 27, 2006	2T6069	12.34
Jodie's husband's harassment is getting to Clemente, making him twitchy. Morris has taken a job with a major pharmaceutical company. Sam's ex-boyfriend Steve arrives at the ER complaining of a stomach pain. Clemente wants to release him but Neela thinks he needs to remain in the ER and is proven correct when Steve displays appendicitis. Morris and Dr. Albright argue about a patient, and after Morris is proven correct, they make out. After hip replacement surgery, Weaver no longer needs a cane to walk. Pratt arrives in Darfur; after he is greeted by Carter, he quickly notices the scope of the horror there.
265	20	"There Are No Angels Here"	Christopher Chulack	R. Scott Gemmill & David Zabel	May 4, 2006	2T6070	11.78
Pratt's work in Darfur brings him into contact with an injured Sheik and his pregnant wife. The Sudanese police hound the couple because of their political importance and prevent Pratt and Carter from caring for the Sheik. His wife delivers the baby while he is imprisoned and develops post partum complication that necessitate transporting her to a surgical center. On the way Pratt and Dakarai (Eamonn Walker) are attacked by Janjaweed soldiers and Pratt must continue the journey alone.
266	21	"The Gallant Hero & the Tragic Victor"	Steve Shill	R. Scott Gemmill	May 11, 2006	2T6071	13.25
Gallant is killed in a roadside bombing in Iraq. Clemente's behavior spirals out of control along with his paranoia about Bobby, and Kovač is forced to take serious action when Clemente smashes a passing taxi outside the hospital and is diagnosed with PTSD. Dubenko offers Neela a surgical residency, but she and the rest of the staff then learn about Gallant's fate. Pratt readjusts to American medicine while treating a seriously injured family of two sons and their father and learning the cause of their injuries. Neela watches Gallant's "farewell" tape. NOTE: Final appearance of Dr. Michael Gallant.
267	22	"Twenty-One Guns"	Nelson McCormick	David Zabel	May 18, 2006	2T6072	16.56
Luka spontaneously proposes to Abby and is disappointed in her response. Anspaugh and Weaver discuss liabilities arising from Clemente's erratic behaviour, including whether Kovač is doing an adequate job as Chief in the ER. Pratt convinces Neela to attend Gallant's graveside funeral. Archie tries to film a memory video in the ER as he prepares to depart for his new job. Among patients brought in are Steve and another inmate who had a fight. An EMT shadowing Sam for the day turns out to be the other inmate's girlfriend and overpowers a police officer to free them. NOTE: This is the last episode until the series finale in which the opening theme by James Newton Howard was used.
