= ER season 14 =

ER
- Season 14
- DVD cover
- Starring: Goran Visnjic; Maura Tierney; Mekhi Phifer; Parminder Nagra; John Stamos; Linda Cardellini; Scott Grimes
- No. of episodes: 19

Release
- Original network: NBC
- Original release: September 27, 2007 – May 15, 2008

Season chronology
- ← Previous; Season 13 Next → Season 15

The fourteenth season of the American fictional drama television series ER first aired on NBC on September 27, 2007, and concluded on May 15, 2008. It consists of 19 episodes. NBC and Warner Bros. Television had planned for the 14th season to be the series' last one and for former regular characters to appear in most episodes including the forecast series finale. Because of the 2007–08 Writers Guild of America strike and the months-long shutdown/ramp-up related to it, these plans were moved onto a 15th season in 2008–09.

== Plot ==
The series celebrates its 300th episode but due to the writers' strike this season runs three episodes shorter than normal. As a result, certain storylines were altered, including Gates' relationship with hospital chaplain Julia Dupree. With Kovač in Croatia, the focus shifts to Abby as she adapts to life as a single parent. Meanwhile, new ER chief Kevin Moretti continues to make his presence felt until he makes a swift exit, Pratt is angered when locum Dr. Wexler is appointed as Moretti's replacement, Sam and Gates start a relationship and Jeanie Boulet makes a return to the ER when her son is brought in.

== Cast ==
=== Main cast ===
- Goran Visnjic as Dr. Luka Kovač, Hospice Physician
- Maura Tierney as Dr. Abby Lockhart, Fourth-year Resident
- Mekhi Phifer as Dr. Greg Pratt, Attending Physician
- Parminder Nagra as Dr. Neela Rasgotra, Second-year Surgical Resident
- John Stamos as Dr. Tony Gates, Second-year Resident
- Linda Cardellini as Nurse Samantha Taggart
- Scott Grimes as Dr. Archie Morris, Attending Physician

=== Supporting ===
Doctors and medical students

- Stanley Tucci as Dr. Kevin Moretti, Chief of Emergency Medicine
- Leland Orser as Dr. Lucien Dubenko, Chief of Surgery
- Kari Matchett as Dr. Skye Wexler, Acting Chief of Emergency Medicine
- David Lyons as Dr. Simon Brenner, ER Attending Physician
- Sam Anderson as Dr. Jack Kayson, Chief of Cardiology
- Amy Aquino as Dr. Janet Coburn, Chief of Obstetrics
- John Aylward as Dr. Donald Anspaugh, Chief of Staff
- J. P. Manoux as Dr. Dustin Crenshaw, Surgical Attending Physician
- Gina Ravera as Dr. Bettina DeJesus, Radiologist
- Busy Philipps as Dr. Hope Bobeck, Intern
- Malaya Rivera Drew as Katey Alvaro, Medical Student
- Charles Esten as Dr. Grossman, Orthopedics
- Robert Gossett as Dr. Everett Daniels, Hospital Board Member
- Anthony Starke as Dr. Craig, Orthopedics
- Michael Buchman Silver as Dr. Paul Meyers, Psychiatrist
- Steven Christopher Parker as Dr. Harold Zalinsky, Surgical Intern
- Gil McKinney as Dr. Paul Grady, ER Intern
- Bresha Webb as Laverne St. John, Medical Student
- Julia Jones as Kaya Montoya, Medical Student
- Marc Jablon as Dr. Larry Weston, Second Year Resident
- Patrick Cassidy as Dr. Ramsey

Nurses

- Deezer D as Nurse Malik McGrath
- Laura Cerón as Nurse Chuny Marquez
- Yvette Freeman as Nurse Haleh Adams
- Lily Mariye as Nurse Lily Jarvik
- Dinah Lenney as Nurse Shirley
- Angel Laketa Moore as Nurse Dawn Archer
- Bellina Logan as Nurse Kit
- Nadia Shazana as Nurse Jacy
- Nasim Pedrad as Nurse Suri
- Mónica Guzmán as Nurse Marisol

Staff, paramedics and officers

- Troy Evans as Desk Clerk Frank Martin
- Jesse Borrego as Desk Clerk Javier
- Reiko Aylesworth as Julia Dupree, Hospital Chaplain
- Emily Wagner as Paramedic Doris Pickman
- Montae Russell as Paramedic Dwight Zadro
- Lyn Alicia Henderson as Paramedic Pamela Olbes
- Brian Lester as Paramedic Brian Dumar
- Michelle Bonilla as Paramedic Christine Harms
- Demetrius Navarro as Paramedic Morales
- Louie Liberti as Paramedic Bardelli
- Brendan Patrick Connor as Paramedic Reidy
- Meg Thalken as Chopper EMT Dee McManus
- Christopher Amitrano as Officer Hollis
- Demetrius Grosse as Officer Newkirk
- Joe Manganiello as Officer Litchman
- Mimi Kennedy as Sergeant O'Malley

Family

- Chloe Greenfield as Sarah Riley
- Bill Bolender as Hank Riley
- Frances Conroy as Becky Riley
- Sam Jones III as Chaz Pratt, EMT
- Rebecca Hazlewood as Jaspreet
- Michael Rady as Brian Moretti
- Andrew Gonzales and Aidan Gonzales as Joe Kovač
- Zoran Radanovich as Niko Kovač

=== Guest stars ===
- Gloria Reuben as Jeanie Boulet, Physician Assistant
- Cress Williams as Officer Reggie Moore
- Mae Whitman as Heather
- Peter Fonda as Pierce Tanner
- Jonathan Banks as Dr Robert Truman
- Hal Holbrook as Walter Perkins
- Josh Stewart as Daniel
- Mariana Klaveno as Rebecca
- Steve Buscemi as Art Masterson
- Derrek Lee as Himself
- Aida Turturro as Sheryl Hawkins
- Drew Powell as Dennis Voltaire
- Sam McMurray as Mike Landry
- Beth Broderick as Edith Landry
- Michael Gaston as Rick
- Howard Hesseman as Dr. James Broderick
- Adriana Barraza as Dolores Salazar

== Production ==
The season was executive produced by Christopher Chulack, Michael Crichton, John Wells, David Zabel, Joe Sachs, and Janine Sherman Barrois. Virgil Williams and Lisa Zwerling act as supervising producers. Wendy Spence Rosato serves as a producer. Tommy Burns is the season's unit production manager and the on-set producer of episodes. Dieter Ismagil and David Malloy served as associate producers on the first nine episodes of the season. Zabel, Sachs, Barrois, Williams, and Zwerling all worked as writers as well as producers. Karen Maser and Shannon Gross complete the writing staff.

Wells directed a single episode of the season and did not write any episodes for the first time. Chulack served as a regular director along with his production role and contributed four episodes including the series finale. Regular director Stephen Cragg also directed four episodes of the season including the series premiere. Returning director Andrew Bernstein contributed two episodes. New director Anthony Hemingway directed two episodes. Film director Rob Hardy directed a single episode, marking his debut in television. Long serving series directors Richard Thorpe and Félix Enríquez Alcalá each contribute a single episode this season. Former cast members Laura Innes and Paul McCrane continue to direct for the series, each contributing a single episode this season. Returning director Tawnia McKiernan also contributed a further episode this season.

== Episodes ==
No. overall	No. in season	Title	Directed by	Written by	Original release date	Prod. code	US viewers (millions)
291	1	"The War Comes Home"	Stephen Cragg	Joe Sachs & David Zabel	September 27, 2007	3T6151	9.92
Moretti's first day continues with a major influx of trauma patients from a panic stampede at a peace rally, and things only get worse when he sends Pratt and Morris home because they had a beer after getting off. When Neela is brought in with major trauma, the ER staff has a hard time keeping their attention focused on their patients. Abby, Greg, and Archie conspire about how to deal with a shared problem.
292	2	"In a Different Light"	Richard Thorpe	Lisa Zwerling & Karen Maser	October 4, 2007	3T6152	9.09
Moretti begins to make his presence felt, as he implements changes in the way patients are seen. The ER staff differ on how to proceed when a patient comes in with a bullet in him needed as evidence. Neela finds herself the object of more attention than she wants, or needs. Abby has passport woes, and struggles with the changes being made. Pratt and Morris find themselves forced to defend their actions, while Hope prepares for a new mission. Gates struggles with his new assignment, until he befriends a precocious young patient who has already diagnosed himself with an incredibly rare condition, Fazio–Londe syndrome.
293	3	"Officer Down"	Christopher Chulack	Janine Sherman Barrois	October 11, 2007	3T6153	8.53
Two wounded police auxiliary officers present challenges in the ER. Neela settles in with Abby as she recovers, while Pratt and Bettina consider their relationship, after Bettina fakes an orgasm Pratt reminds her that he is not a 'mind reader'. Dubenko helps Gates get his young genius patient into a drug trial. Morris spends the day in an inexplicable bad mood, until he admits to Abby that his unsupportive father has just died.
294	4	"Gravity"	Stephen Cragg	Virgil Williams	October 18, 2007	3T6154	10.12
It is a bad day for Abby, who is missing the still-absent Kovač and is unable to reach him when Joe is brought to the ER after a fall. Elsewhere, the day puts family first as Morris cares for a frightened child and Pratt defends his brother. Neela returns to work, and Moretti returns from a conference. A patient's mother gives the ER staffers makeovers in appreciation. The ER gets a new clerk.
295	5	"Under the Influence"	Anthony Hemingway	Joe Sachs	October 25, 2007	3T6155	9.25
As Morris prepares to take his written board exams, the staff tries to uncover details about Neela's unusual new intern. Kovač's obligations to his family in Croatia leave Abby feeling the burden of single parenthood; and Moretti, pleased with Gates' performance in the ICU, reassigns him to the ER.
296	6	"The Test"	Félix Enríquez Alcalá	Lisa Zwerling	November 1, 2007	3T6156	9.15
While Morris and Pratt cram for their boards, Abby defends the interns' performance to an underwhelmed Moretti, who has hired new attending Skye Wexler (Kari Matchett) to alleviate County's staffing crunch. Elsewhere, Harold turns to Neela for guidance on a personal matter; and a teenage patient (Mae Whitman) feels neglected by the doctors and takes extreme measures.
297	7	"Blackout"	Christopher Chulack	David Zabel	November 8, 2007	3T6157	8.44
In the middle of a heat wave, the A/C is out in the ER and the power keeps flickering. Lockhart and Pratt disagree over a fretful baby. Several elderly patients are brought in from a nursing home when the A/C at the home goes out. Moretti takes issue with Lockhart taking "end runs" around his preemptive orders. Hope has broken up with Archie, who is fretting about his board results. When he hears that Pratt passed, he says he did also.
298	8	"Coming Home"	Laura Innes	David Zabel	November 15, 2007	3T6158	9.60
Abby is still on edge from her drunken one-night-stand with Moretti and it's affecting her work; Luka's homecoming only makes her guilt worse. Moretti is preoccupied after a disturbing Skype session with his son. And Tony gets a frightened call from Sarah after she gets in over her head with a college boy; when he returns her to her grandparents he has a rancorous confrontation with her grandfather. Cases include a boy who fell off a roof, whose paraplegic father is concerned by Abby's seeming lack of concern, and a man injured during a cheese rolling event.
299	9	"Skye's the Limit"	Paul McCrane	Karen Maser	November 29, 2007	3T6159	8.71
It is time for changes in the ER when Anspaugh makes an unpopular decision and appoints Skye as ER chief over Pratt. Abby has old demons to fight with, which distances her from friends and family. Even Kovač seems to be at a loss to help Abby. Love is in the air when a secret romance blooms between two doctors.
300	10	"300 Patients"	John Wells	Joe Sachs & David Zabel	December 6, 2007	3T6160	8.15
Sam, Pratt, and Morris treat Melissa Tanner, a 61-year-old woman with health problems, and her 19-year-old son Lowell following a car accident. Lowell has Down's syndrome and has been living in a foster home since he was a baby. Melissa has been visiting him every week without her husband's (Peter Fonda) knowledge. Also, Neela and Dubenko have been at the dress rehearsal for the hospital holiday pageant and Dubenko has been bitten on the leg. Following the death of his father, Kovač and Abby prepare to fly out to Croatia and it appears that Abby is tackling her drinking problem.
301	11	"Status Quo"	Andrew Bernstein	Janine Sherman Barrois	January 3, 2008	3T6161	9.38
After being passed over for Chief of the ER, Pratt considers taking a position elsewhere, but reconsiders after working with Jeanie Boulet. She comes in after her son, Carlos, is admitted from an apparent head injury, and he is found to have a brain lesion – possibly a sign of AIDS. Before they find out what is going on, he goes into convulsions. A female soldier comes in with a broken leg, and is discovered to be pregnant. When her husband realizes that she got pregnant while separated from him when on duty in Iraq, she says her pregnancy is the result of her rape by her sergeant there. Neela's cousin is in town for a visit, and Morris and Harold compete for her affections. Neela earns an ortho rotation. NOTE: Final appearance of Jeanie Boulet.
302	12	"Believe the Unseen"	Rob Hardy	Virgil Williams	January 10, 2008	3T6162	9.07
Abby checks out of rehab and finds her way back to the ER; Harold finds new confidence after a big night with Neela's cousin; multiple survivors of a fire come in.
303	13	"Atonement"	Stephen Cragg	Lisa Zwerling	January 17, 2008	3T6163	8.92
Julia tries to help a prison doctor (Jonathan Banks) seeking forgiveness after saving the son of a man he once executed, but the mother is unable to do so. Neela participates in the ortho–surgery hockey match, but discovers the surgeons have a "ringer." Pratt confronts his issues with commitment when Bettina wants to take their relationship to a new level.
304	14	"Owner of a Broken Heart"	Christopher Chulack	David Zabel & Joe Sachs	April 10, 2008	3T6165	7.52
Abby is about to travel to Croatia, back to Kovač and a lot of memories are going around her head. A new attending, Simon Brenner, starts in the ER. Two women come to the ER as a multiple trauma. Another patient comes into the ER after suffering chest pain. Sam's relationship with Gates intensifies after he and Julia break up and the chaplain heads off to Nepal. Morris tests a taser on himself with very unpleasant results. NOTE: First appearance of Dr. Simon Brenner.
305	15	"…As the Day She Was Born"	Tawnia McKiernan	Shannon Goss	April 17, 2008	3T6164	7.82
Abby has arrived in Croatia to join Kovač and Joe. A mother of four arrives in the ER and Neela helps take care of her. Neela is in a terrible mood over her lack of a social life on her mostly-forgotten birthday. Sarah's grandfather becomes ill and Gates clashes with her grandmother and Morris over a course of treatment. Pratt puts his new management skills to the test, but is kicked to the curb by Bettina.
306	16	"Truth Will Out"	Andrew Bernstein	Story by : Karen Maser; Teleplay by : Karen Maser & Lisa Zwerling	April 24, 2008	3T6166	7.53
Abby tells Kovač about her drinking and infidelity. Kovač takes a job at a hospice for cancer patients, bonds with a patient played by Hal Holbrook, and makes a startling decision about his and Abby's future. Abby also clashes with Neela over treatment for a Korean man with lymphoma, and shines when she saves a woman who has given birth to her thirteenth child, before having a new interview for an attending position at County. Sam's sour attitude gets her grief from both Abby and Gates, so she makes a grand gesture towards the latter. Neela's mother-of-four has bad news and Neela helps her deal with it. Brenner turns out to be Anspaugh's nephew. Dubenko's relationship with Skye collapses after he accuses her of having a pathological need for male attention.
307	17	"Under Pressure"	Stephen Cragg	Janine Sherman Barrois	May 1, 2008	3T6167	7.81
A young couple (Josh Stewart and Mariana Klaveno) are admitted from a car accident after robbing a jewelry store. The hospital staff hear the news of the robbery, comparing the couple to Bonnie and Clyde, but does not realize they are the same as those just admitted. When the woman starts to bleed out, her boyfriend holds the hospital staff at gunpoint and forces them to operate in the ER. Greg refuses to let Bettina push him away.
308	18	"Tandem Repeats"	Anthony Hemingway	Virgil Williams	May 8, 2008	3T6168	7.56
Neela is shocked by Dubenko's decisions during her mother-of-four's surgery, and things get worse for her when she has to give the mom devastating news. Abby goes after a position at an upscale medical facility when it does not appear news on an attending position is in the offing, but shines at County while treating a young woman with a huge family secret. Brenner and his medical student have issues; a DVD of CCTV footage featuring Sam and Gates circulates at the hospital; Pratt is there for Bettina and tries to help Abby's career; and Morris seeks help in the aftermath of the previous week's hostage situation.
309	19	"The Chicago Way"	Christopher Chulack	David Zabel & Lisa Zwerling	May 15, 2008	3T6169	8.43
The actions of a drunken patient (Steve Buscemi) endanger everyone at County. In other events, Pratt makes a move toward becoming chief; Gates worries about his future with Sam; and Kovač has an unexpected encounter with Moretti that convinces him to forgive Abby. An ambulance explodes at the end with either Sam or Pratt inside.

== DVD ==
The DVD of the series includes a half-hour featurette recorded at the celebration event for the 300th episode.
