= ER season 15 =

ER
- Season 15
- DVD cover
- Starring: Anthony Edwards; George Clooney; Sherry Stringfield; Noah Wyle; Julianna Margulies; Laura Innes; Alex Kingston; Goran Visnjic; Maura Tierney; Mekhi Phifer; Parminder Nagra; John Stamos; Linda Cardellini; Scott Grimes; David Lyons; Eriq La Salle; Angela Bassett
- No. of episodes: 22

Release
- Original network: NBC
- Original release: September 25, 2008 – April 2, 2009

Season chronology
- ← Previous; Season 14

The fifteenth and final season of the American fictional drama television series ER premiered on NBC on September 25, 2008, and concluded on April 2, 2009, in a two-hour episode preceded by a one-hour retrospective special. It consists of 22 episodes. Because actors Mekhi Phifer, Goran Visnjic, and Maura Tierney had been told the 14th season would be the last one, they had no plans or interest in returning for Season 15. The producers agreed to film two Season 15 episodes at the very end of the Season 14 production cycle so that all three actors could finish their time on the show and move on to other projects. Tierney made a one-scene guest appearance in an episode near the end of Season 15.

== Plot ==
The final season opens with the revelation that Gregory Pratt is the victim of the ambulance explosion in the prior season's finale. Despite Pratt's colleagues' efforts, he dies from his injuries. Cate Banfield is introduced as the new ER chief, who has a seemingly mysterious past with County General. Luka Kovač and Abby Lockhart move to Boston. Brenner must deal with issues surrounding his childhood, and comes to a crossroads in his relationship with Neela Rasgotra, who must make difficult personal and professional decisions. Samantha Taggart's relationship with Tony Gates suffers a setback after an accident involving Taggart's son, Alex.

To mark the end of the series after 15 years, several former cast members return to the show. Mark Greene, Robert Romano, and Kerry Weaver appear in a flashback episode that explores Banfield's history with County General. John Carter returns to work at County, although, unbeknown to his colleagues, he urgently needs a kidney transplant. Peter Benton, Doug Ross, Carol Hathaway, Susan Lewis, Elizabeth Corday, and Ray Barnett return in various episodes. The series ends with a final multiple casualty incident, showing that life goes on at County General.

== Cast ==
=== Main cast ===
- Maura Tierney as Dr. Abby Lockhart, Attending Physician
- Mekhi Phifer as Dr. Greg Pratt, Attending Physician
- Goran Visnjic as Dr. Luka Kovač
- Parminder Nagra as Dr. Neela Rasgotra, Third-year Surgical Resident
- John Stamos as Dr. Tony Gates, Third-year Resident
- Linda Cardellini as Nurse Samantha Taggart
- Scott Grimes as Dr. Archie Morris, Attending Physician
- David Lyons as Dr. Simon Brenner, Attending Physician
- Angela Bassett as Dr. Catherine Banfield, Chief of Emergency Medicine

=== Special appearances ===
The final season included special appearances by departed main and recurring cast members; in the episodes in which they appeared, they were credited along with the main cast members.

Returning main characters

- Anthony Edwards as Dr. Mark Greene (in flashback only)
- Noah Wyle as Dr. John Carter
- George Clooney as Dr. Doug Ross
- Julianna Margulies as Nurse Carol Hathaway
- Eriq La Salle as Dr. Peter Benton
- Laura Innes as Dr. Kerry Weaver
- Sherry Stringfield as Dr. Susan Lewis
- Alex Kingston as Dr. Elizabeth Corday
- Shane West as Dr. Ray Barnett
- Paul McCrane as Dr. Robert Romano (in flashback only)

Returning recurring characters

- William H. Macy as Dr. David Morgenstern
- Ellen Crawford as Nurse Lydia Wright
- Hallee Hirsh as Rachel Greene
- Thandiwe Newton as Makemba "Kem" Likasu
- Matthew Watkins as Reese Benton

=== Supporting ===
Doctors and medical students

- Amy Aquino as Dr. Janet Coburn, Chief of Obstetrics
- John Aylward as Dr. Donald Anspaugh, Chief of Staff
- Leland Orser as Dr. Lucien Dubenko, Chief of Surgery
- J. P. Manoux as Dr. Dustin Crenshaw, Surgical Attending Physician
- Gina Ravera as Dr. Bettina DeJesús, Radiologist
- Michael Buchman Silver as Dr. Paul Meyers, Psychiatrist
- Shiri Appleby as Dr. Daria Wade, ER Intern
- Julian Morris as Dr. Andrew Wade, Surgical Intern
- Victor Rasuk as Dr. Ryan Sánchez, ER Intern
- Emily Rose as Dr. Tracy Martin, ER Intern
- Sam Jones III as Chaz Pratt, First Year Medical Student/Part Time EMT
- Alexis Bledel as Dr. Julia Wise, ER Intern
- Gil McKinney as Dr. Paul Grady, Second Year ER Resident
- Bresha Webb as Dr. Laverne St. John, ER Intern
- Julia Jones as Dr. Kaya Montoya, ER Intern
- Perry Anzilotti as Dr. Ed, Anesthesiologist

Nurses

- Deezer D as Nurse Malik McGrath
- Laura Cerón as Nurse Chuny Marquez
- Yvette Freeman as Nurse Haleh Adams
- Lily Mariye as Nurse Lily Jarvik
- Dinah Lenney as Nurse Shirley
- Nasim Pedrad as Nurse Suri
- Angel Laketa Moore as Nurse Dawn Archer
- Mary Heiss as Nurse Mary
- Mónica Guzmán as Nurse Marisol

Staff, paramedics and officers

- Abraham Benrubi as Desk Clerk Jerry Markovic
- Troy Evans as Desk Clerk Frank Martin
- Tara Karsian as Social Worker Liz Dade
- Emily Wagner as Paramedic Doris Pickman
- Montae Russell as Paramedic Dwight Zadro
- Lyn Alicia Henderson as Paramedic Pamela Olbes
- Brian Lester as Paramedic Brian Dumar
- Demetrius Navarro as Paramedic Morales
- Louie Liberti as Paramedic Bardelli
- Brendan Patrick Connor as Paramedic Reidy
- Justina Machado as Officer Claudia Diaz
- Christopher Amitrano as Officer Hollis
- Demetrius Grosse as Officer Newkirk
- Eddie Smith as Officer Jones

Family

- Hallee Hirsh as Rachel Greene
- Chloe Greenfield as Sarah Riley
- Courtney B. Vance as Russell Banfield
- Ellaraino as Marie Banfield
- Daylon Adkison as Daryl Banfield (in flashback only)
- Sam Jones III as Chaz Pratt
- Dominic Janes as Alex Taggart
- Amy Madigan as Mary Taggart
- Shannon Woodward as Kelly Taggart
- Andrew Gonzales and Aidan Gonzales as Joe Kovač
- Kasey Mahaffy as Johnny Morris

=== Notable guest stars ===
- Christa B. Allen as Jody Nugent
- Tom Arnold as The Big Kahuna
- Ernest Borgnine as Paul Manning
- Chadwick Boseman as Derek Taylor
- Louis Gossett Jr. as Leo Malcolm
- Judy Greer as Tildie Mulligan
- Tony Hale as Norman
- Marilu Henner as Linda
- Brent and Shane Kinsman as Curly and Larry Weddington
- Rooney Mara as Megan
- Garry Marshall as Harry Feingold
- Debra Mooney as Barbara Feingold
- Justina Machado as Claudia Diaz
- Noah Munck as Logan
- Charlotte Rae as Roxanne
- Leonard Roberts as Police Officer
- Susan Sarandon as Nora
- Wallace Shawn as Teddy Lempell
- Ariel Winter as Lucy Moore

== Production ==
=== Crew ===
- Christopher Chulack – Executive producer
- Michael Crichton – Creator/Executive producer
- John Wells – Executive producer
- David Zabel – Executive producer
- Joe Sachs – Executive producer
- Janine Sherman Barrois – Executive producer
- Lisa Zwerling – Co-executive producer
- Tommy Burns – Producer
- Wendy Spence Rosato – Producer
- Charles M. Lagola – Production designer
- Arthur Albert – Director of photography
- Martin Davich – Music
- Randy Jon Morgan, A.C.E. – Editor
- Mimi Leder, a frequent director during ER's first two seasons, returned as a director for the episode "A Long, Strange Trip"
- Rod Holcomb, the director of the 1994 pilot episode as well as several other early episodes, returned to direct two episodes in this season, among them the series finale
- Paul McCrane, recurring cast member seasons 4 and 5, and series regular seasons 6–10, continues his affiliation with the show as director of two episodes this season

== Episodes ==
No. overall	No. in season	Title	Directed by	Written by	Original release date	Prod. code	US viewers (millions)
310	1	"Life After Death"	Christopher Misiano	Joe Sachs	September 25, 2008	3T7101	8.03
Gates hurries to the scene of the ambulance explosion after learning it was Pratt, not Sam, in the ambulance. Pratt is rushed back to County suffering from blast injuries, where the ER staff work to stabilize him. Eventually, a carotid tear develops, and despite the rallying efforts of his colleagues, he dies. Meanwhile, Abby misdiagnoses a patient, and talks about her plans to leave Chicago to start a new life with Kovač, while Morris must pick up the pieces after Pratt's death. NOTE: Final appearance of Dr. Greg Pratt.
311	2	"Another Thursday at County"	Paul McCrane	Lisa Zwerling	October 9, 2008	3T7102	9.41
A new batch of interns as well as the new head of the ER arrive for their first day at County. A bio-terrorist with a bag full of ricin is admitted with a broken leg. NOTE: First appearance of Dr. Catherine Banfield.
312	3	"The Book of Abby"	Christopher Chulack	David Zabel	October 16, 2008	3T7103	8.96
Abby gets a job in Boston and tries to leave County General quietly, but the staff makes it known how much they will miss her. Abby says goodbye and leaves for Boston with Kovač and their son. NOTE: Final appearance of Dr. Luka Kovač and the final regular appearance of Dr. Abby Lockhart.
313	4	"Parental Guidance"	John Gallagher	Janine Sherman Barrois	October 23, 2008	3T7104	8.82
Dissatisfied with the interns' performance, Banfield decides to start a new system. Each intern gets a mentor with daily two-way crits: Daria is paired with Gates, Ryan with Morris, and Tracy with Brenner. Brenner tells Tracy how he wants to proceed, but she insists on doing things her way. A girl comes in with a broken leg which may be caused by a severely mentally ill family member.
314	5	"Haunted"	Christopher Chulack	Karen Maser	October 30, 2008	3T7105	9.19
Sam's time is taken up by her studies for a pharmacology exam, leaving Gates feeling neglected. A school fight results in a stabbing, with Brenner treating the victim and trying to uncover the truth behind the story. Morris has a surprise for Neela. Gates gets locked in a stairwell with a quiet young boy on Halloween night.
315	6	"Oh, Brother"	Stephen Cragg	Virgil Williams	November 6, 2008	3T7106	8.61
Banfield is upset when her husband Russell (Courtney B. Vance) insists on a visit with his parents; Morris treats a young boxer (Chadwick Boseman) whose father (Carl Weathers) wishes him to quit, during treatment Morris favors Chaz over senior interns, resulting in trouble; Gates asks Sam and Alex to move in with him and treats a war veteran.
316	7	"Heal Thyself"	David Zabel	David Zabel	November 13, 2008	3T7108	9.90
Banfield must deal with the ghosts of her past when a critically ill child arrives in the ER. A past encounter with Mark Greene helps her diagnose and confront her own problems. Neela's intern loses his first patient, and struggles to cope. NOTE: Final appearance of Dr. Mark Greene and Dr. Robert Romano. NOTE: At the beginning of the episode, Eriq La Salle pays tribute to series creator Michael Crichton, who died the week before the episode aired.
317	8	"Age of Innocence"	Paul McCrane	Janine Sherman Barrois	November 20, 2008	3T7107	8.88
A man acquitted of child molestation comes into the ER with his wife, who was injured when their house was set on fire, drawing Brenner's hostility. Later, the man's interest in a young girl leads his brother-in-law to beat him, nearly blinding him. When Brenner becomes emotional while the man is treated, Morris confronts him, leading to an emotional revelation about Brenner's past. Neela's frustration with her intern reaches the boiling point, and Dubenko teaches her a lesson in the importance of teaching and mentorship. Gates continues his search for the missing veteran.
318	9	"Let It Snow"	Charles Haid	Joe Sachs	December 4, 2008	3T7109	8.20
While snow strands Banfield and Morris at a doctors' conference in Omaha, Gates is left in charge of the kids. He allows Sam's son Alex and Sarah to walk through the blizzard to a nearby party. Driving a friend's car after the party, Alex is gravely injured as he crashes in the storm. Sam goes ballistic.
319	10	"The High Holiday"	Lesli Linka Glatter	Shannon Goss	December 11, 2008	3T7110	9.04
Morris receives an unwanted package from his father at the ER doorstep. Sam is anxious about getting Alex off of the ventilator after his accident. Meanwhile, a pregnant woman with a high-risk pregnancy is in danger of getting deported and a batch of brownies have some interesting effects to staff that eat them. Sam tells Gates that she and Alex are moving out.
320	11	"Separation Anxiety"	Terence Nightingall	Virgil Williams	January 8, 2009	3T7111	7.34
The ER treats two brothers who are shot during a drug deal. Banfield and her husband continue their quest to restart their family. Sam and Gates argue while treating patients.
321	12	"Dream Runner"	Andrew Bernstein	Lisa Zwerling	January 15, 2009	3T7112	6.95
Neela has a series of three dreams where the outcome of the lives of two patients depend on her decisions. In the first two dreams, she makes either of two choices, but each one kills the patients. In the third dream, she makes a new choice, saving the lives of two patients as well as sleeping with Brenner. In the end, it is revealed they were all dreams. Meanwhile, Banfield and Morris are still at odds and Banfield goes home.
322	13	"Love Is a Battlefield"	Richard Thorpe	Karen Maser	January 22, 2009	3T7113	7.65
Morris treats a youngster who was hit while riding her bike. Meanwhile, Gates has trouble distancing himself from Sam; and Neela's nerves take over when she learns Brenner has returned from Australia.
323	14	"A Long, Strange Trip"	Mimi Leder	Joe Sachs	February 5, 2009	3T7116	7.25
Dr. Morgenstern visits County General upon learning a former mentor is seriously ill. Meanwhile, Sam's sister (Shannon Woodward) drops by unexpectedly; Gates and Morris treat an elderly man (Rance Howard) who was assaulted on the street; and Brenner is shocked by a patient's diagnosis.
324	15	"The Family Man"	Eriq La Salle	Andrew Fash	February 12, 2009	3T7114	7.24
A mother is severely injured by a car accident in the ambulance bay; an insurance company frustrates Morris and he gets a major surprise; Neela tells Brenner about her offer in North Carolina. Meanwhile, a man refuses treatment and Gates and Neela try to get him to consider treatment.
325	16	"The Beginning of the End"	Jonathan Kaplan	David Zabel & Lisa Zwerling	February 19, 2009	3T7115	7.51
Valentine's Day in the ER sees Neela and Brenner growing closer. Banfield tries to convince her husband to go along with her new plan to have a baby. Gates treats a patient who may have ingested a toxin while "mushroom hunting" while Neela performs surgery on a young girl's mother. Morris and his girlfriend clash when he suspects her fellow officers physically assaulted a badly injured patient. Carter returns to the ER for a visit, gets the OK from Banfield to do some shift work at County, and is seen on hemodialysis in the final scene.
326	17	"T-Minus-6"	Rod Holcomb	David Zabel & Lisa Zwerling	February 26, 2009	3T7117	8.72
The Banfields explore their options with an adoption agency. Carter struggles with the new procedural and technological advances made to emergency medicine since he has been gone. Brenner confronts Lucy's foster family about his concerns. Morris treats a couple who takes his advice too far. Sam is shocked when her mother is brought into the ER. Neela makes a decision about her future at County. Banfield discovers Carter's medical condition.
327	18	"What We Do"	David Zabel	David Zabel	March 5, 2009	3T7118	8.71
A camera crew shooting footage for a documentary descends upon the ER. Detective Claudia Diaz is brought in with life-threatening gunshot wounds. Neela is perplexed by the lack of communication between her and Brenner. Sam struggles to reconcile with her mother. Carter's condition suddenly worsens.
328	19	"Old Times"	John Wells	John Wells	March 12, 2009	3T7119	10.86
As Carter awaits his kidney transplant, he gets a surprise visit from Benton. Meanwhile, Ross and Hathaway must receive consent for organ donation from a woman who is grief-stricken over the sudden death of her grandson, but Sam and Neela are stuck at the airport with the transplant organs in hand. Banfield bonds with an abandoned baby. Brenner continues to care for a little girl whose mother is awaiting a heart transplant. NOTE: Final appearance of Dr. Doug Ross and Nurse Carol Hathaway.
329	20	"Shifting Equilibrium"	Andrew Bernstein	Lisa Zwerling	March 19, 2009	3T7120	9.47
Neela clashes with Dubenko on two surgical cases and looks to prove her worth as attending material before she leaves County for good. Brenner looks to gain some insight into his abusive childhood. NOTE: Final appearance of Dr. Abby Lockhart.
330	21	"I Feel Good"	Stephen Cragg	Joe Sachs	March 26, 2009	3T7121	10.36
A woman returns to County to claim the baby she had abandoned there. The ER doctors and nurses assist at a camp for children recovering from open heart surgeries where Morris proposes to Claudia and Brenner befriends a kid who does not want to join in with the activities. NOTE: Final appearance of Dr. Ray Barnett.
331	22	"And in the End..."	Rod Holcomb	John Wells	April 2, 2009	3T7122-23	16.38
Series finale. A new medical facility for the underprivileged funded by Carter is opened and old colleagues return to show their support. Gates treats a teenager with alcohol poisoning after she and her friends play a drinking game. Sam is surprised when she receives a special gift for her birthday. This two-hour episode was preceded by a one-hour retrospective special. At the end, a multiple casualty incident brings multiple victims to the ER and County General is seen for the final time.
