= ER season 13 =

ER
- Season 13
- DVD cover
- Starring: Goran Visnjic; Maura Tierney; Mekhi Phifer; Parminder Nagra; John Stamos; Linda Cardellini; Shane West; Scott Grimes; Laura Innes
- No. of episodes: 23

Release
- Original network: NBC
- Original release: September 21, 2006 – May 17, 2007

Season chronology
- ← Previous; Season 12 Next → Season 14

The thirteenth season of the American fictional drama television series ER first aired on NBC on September 21, 2006, and concluded on May 17, 2007. It consists of 23 episodes.

== Plot ==
In the aftermath of the shootout Abby delivers a premature baby while Sam suffers a terrifying ordeal at the hands of her ex-boyfriend. Meanwhile, the show's longest-serving character Kerry Weaver departs when Kovač is forced to make budget cuts which threaten her job. Paramedic Tony Gates returns as the ER's new intern, Kovač is sued for malpractice and is later forced to return to Croatia to care for his father, Abby struggles to adapt to motherhood and Ray is involved in a life-changing accident which turns Neela's world upside down.

== Cast ==
=== Main cast ===
- Goran Visnjic as Dr. Luka Kovač, Chief of Emergency Medicine
- Maura Tierney as Dr. Abby Lockhart, Third-year Resident
- Mekhi Phifer as Dr. Greg Pratt, Attending Physician
- Parminder Nagra as Dr. Neela Rasgotra, Surgical Intern
- John Stamos as Dr. Tony Gates, ER Intern (episodes 2–23)
- Linda Cardellini as Nurse Samantha Taggart
- Shane West as Dr. Ray Barnett, Third-year Resident
- Scott Grimes as Dr. Archie Morris, Attending Physician
- Laura Innes as Dr. Kerry Weaver, Attending Physician (episodes 1–13)

=== Supporting ===
Doctors and medical students

- Stanley Tucci as Dr. Kevin Moretti, Chief of Emergency Medicine (season finale only)
- Amy Aquino as Dr. Janet Coburn, Chief of Obstetrics
- John Aylward as Dr. Donald Anspaugh, Chief of Staff
- Leland Orser as Dr. Lucien Dubenko, Chief of Surgery
- J. P. Manoux as Dr. Dustin Crenshaw, Surgical Chief Resident
- Gina Ravera as Dr. Bettina DeJesus, Radiologist
- Maury Sterling as Dr. Nelson, Psychiatrist
- Sara Gilbert as Dr. Jane Figler, Second Year Resident
- Busy Philipps as Dr. Hope Bobeck, Intern
- Julia Ling as Mae Lee Park, Medical Student
- Kim Strauss as Dr. Ari, Anesthesiologist
- Malaya Rivera Drew as Katey Alvaro, Medical Student
- Marc Jablon as Dr. Larry Weston, Intern
- Perry Anzilotti as Dr. Ed, Anesthesiologist
- Ethan Hova as Dr. Ken Maser
- Aasif Mandvi as Dr. Manish
- L. Scott Caldwell as Dr. Megan Rabb, Director of Neo-Natology
- Dahlia Salem as Dr. Jessica Albright, Surgical Chief Resident (outgoing)

Nurses

- Deezer D as Nurse Malik McGrath
- Laura Cerón as Nurse Chuny Marquez
- Yvette Freeman as Nurse Haleh Adams
- Lily Mariye as Nurse Lily Jarvik
- Dinah Lenney as Nurse Shirley
- Angel Laketa Moore as Nurse Dawn Archer
- Kip Pardue as Nurse Ben Parker
- Kyle Richards as Nurse Dori Kerns
- Nasim Pedrad as Nurse Suri
- Tane Kawasaki as Nurse Claire
- Mary Heiss as Nurse Mary

Staff, paramedics and officers

- Abraham Benrubi as Desk Clerk Jerry Markovic
- Troy Evans as Desk Clerk Frank Martin
- Glenn Plummer as Desk Clerk Timmy Rawlins
- Tara Karsian as Social Worker Liz Dade
- Charlayne Woodard as Angela Gilliam (from Staff Services)
- Emily Wagner as Paramedic Doris Pickman
- Montae Russell as Paramedic Dwight Zadro
- Lyn Alicia Henderson as Paramedic Pamela Olbes
- Michelle Bonilla as Paramedic Christine Harms
- Demetrius Navarro as Paramedic Morales
- Brian Lester as Paramedic Brian Dumar
- Louie Liberti as Paramedic Bardelli
- Brendan Patrick Connor as Paramedic Reidy
- Vyto Ruginis as Flight Paramedic Wright
- Christopher Amitrano as Officer Hollis
- Joe Manganiello as Officer Litchman
- Chad McKnight as Officer Wilson
- Bobby Nish as Officer Danny Yau
- Louis Iacoviello as Officer Rovner

Family

- Sally Field as Maggie Wyczenski
- Fred Ward as Eddie Wyczenski
- Estelle Harris as Mrs. Markovic (Jerry's mom)
- Sam Jones III as Chaz Pratt, later Paramedic
- Dominic Janes as Alex Taggart
- Garret Dillahunt as Steve Curtis
- Lois Smith as Gracie (Sam's grandmother)
- Paula Malcomson as Meg Riley
- Chloe Greenfield as Sarah Riley
- George Gerdes as Jim Riley
- Deka Beaudine as Helen Riley
- Stacy Keach as Mike Gates
- Rosalee Mayeux as Jacy Barnett
- Michelle Hurd as Courtney Brown
- Andrew Gonzales and Aidan Gonzales as Joe Kovač

=== Guest stars ===
- Armand Assante as Richard Elliott
- John Mahoney as Bennett Cray
- Forest Whitaker as Curtis Ames
- Keith David as Pastor Watkins
- Annabella Sciorra as Diana Moore
- Hassan Johnson as Darnell Thibeaux
- Andy Dick as Tommy Brewer
- Rico Rodriguez as James
- Freddy Rodriguez as Simon

== Production ==
=== Crew ===
- Christopher Chulack – Executive producer
- Michael Crichton – Creator/executive producer
- John Wells – Executive producer
- David Zabel – Executive producer
- Joe Sachs – Co-executive producer
- Janine Sherman Barrois – Co-executive producer
- R. Scott Gemmill – Executive producer
- Richard Thorpe – Producer
- Lisa Zwerling – Producer
- Tommy Burns – Producer
- Virgil Williams – Producer
- Wendy Spence Rosato – Producer
- Charles M. Lagola – Production designer
- Arthur Albert – Director of photography
- Martin Davich – Music
- Kevin Casey – Editor

== Episodes ==
No. overall	No. in season	Title	Directed by	Written by	Original release date	Prod. code	US viewers (millions)
268	1	"Bloodline"	Stephen Cragg	Joe Sachs & David Zabel	September 21, 2006	2T7801	15.59
The hospital staff copes with the immediate aftermath of the shootout. Weaver finds Abby unconscious and Kovač tied to a gurney. Abby's trauma puts her into pre-term labor, and when the risk of placental abruption becomes a reality, her baby is born two and a half months prematurely. When bleeding continues, Abby undergoes a hysterectomy. Jerry's heart was nicked by a bullet and he has to have surgery, which Dubenko and Neela perform successfully. After a rough chase from local police, Steve and his co-conspirators decide to hide out with hostages Sam and Alex. Eventually Steve shoots both of the co-conspirators, who want to dump Sam and Alex, and then tells Sam that he would rather his family were all dead than to be separated again. Later that night, after Alex is asleep in the van, Steve rapes Sam. When Steve falls asleep, Sam takes the keys to the van and prepares to escape with Alex but then goes back, picks up Steve's gun, and shoots him three times. NOTE: This is the first episode until the series finale that does not feature the original opening title sequence or James Newton Howard's theme song.
269	2	"Graduation Day"	Joanna Kerns	Janine Sherman Barrois & Lisa Zwerling	September 28, 2006	2T7802	14.36
While Abby's baby, Joe, struggles in the NICU, Maggie visits and has a more pleasant time than usual with Abby. Sam's former employer, Elliott, helps her forestall any police investigation of Steve's death. Pratt becomes an ER attending. Kovač and Abby clash about trying a risky experimental treatment for Joe; eventually Abby agrees and Joe improves, but develops complications that are noticed at first by Maggie, who insists that the Attending, Dr Rabb, be paged, saving baby Joe's life. He requires surgery, but finally recovers. The hospital board meets to fire Kovač over the Clemente fiasco; when Weaver confesses that she, not Kovač, was responsible, she is demoted to an ER attending. Morris is disenchanted as a pharmaceutical representative and wants, and finally gets, the open ER attending slot, with Pratt's help. Paramedic Tony Gates returns and offers emotional support to a still grieving Neela, and it is revealed that he is becoming a new intern at the hospital. At the end of the episode, Abby (for the first time) invites her mother to visit them again as she tends to her infant son.
270	3	"Somebody to Love"	Stephen Cragg	David Zabel	October 5, 2006	2T7803	14.68
Pratt's excitement at becoming an attending is cut short when he has to teach the new interns and supervise the residents. Gates and Pratt argue over Gates' failure to keep his charts current and the treatment of a gay heart patient, which results in the patient's partner (John Mahoney) fighting his family over keeping him alive. Gates goes against Pratt's orders and saves the patient's life, but he is brain dead, which ultimately makes things worse on all fronts, especially with Pratt. After finding out Alex has not been talking to the psychologist that Sam set him up with, she confronts him and finds that Alex witnessed the shooting. Gates has sex with someone who appears to be his roommate. After visiting Abby and baby Joe, Neela meets the new chief resident of surgery, Dr. Dustin Crenshaw, who has a personality (and hair) that are very similar to the late Dr. Romano.
271	4	"Parenthood"	Tawnia McKiernan	R. Scott Gemmill	October 12, 2006	2T7804	14.58
Abby enrolls in a "Mommy and Me" class and meets a group of nannies, which changes her outlook on childcare. A grandfather and grandson are injured in a chainsaw accident, leaving Kovač stuck upstairs with a difficult case. Pratt has his trial-by-fire when he has to handle the ER alone, juggling multiple traumas, teaching duties, and Gates, whose paramedic experience lead him to try difficult procedures unsupervised and dictate his notes, both of which infuriate Pratt. Neela mentors a new med student assigned to surgery and lends a hand when Pratt makes a serious error, to the scorn of the chief surgical resident. Sam discovers Alex's latest extracurricular activity. Gates turns out to be living with a woman, Meg, and her daughter, Sarah.
272	5	"Ames v. Kovac"	Richard Thorpe	Joe Sachs	October 19, 2006	2T7805	13.72
Curtis Ames (Forest Whitaker), a carpenter who had a stroke while under Kovač's care for pneumonia, sues him for malpractice. During the trial, each man's recollections of Ames' treatment are recounted via testimony and flashbacks. Kovač worries about the implications of the suit and the possible outcomes. Abby returns to work and must adjust to the dramatic changes in her life. An equipment shortage hampers Pratt, Abby, and Neela's treatment of a patient, leading them to attempt a risky procedure. Pratt's early morning trip to the barbershop results in a new awareness of community need.
273	6	"Heart of the Matter"	Andrew Bernstein	Janine Sherman Barrois	November 2, 2006	2T7806	13.85
A collision between a motorcycle and a car brings critical patients to the ER. Kovač and Ray treat the motorcycle rider, and discover a condition his wife wants kept secret. Abby and Neela work on the driver of the car, but his surgery does not go well and his wife soon has troubles of her own. Pratt has a new lady in his life, and a new roommate. Gates has a different kind of girl trouble, and we learn that Meg and Sarah were the family of Gates' friend Keith, who was killed during the Gulf War. Kovač gets some important news, and an unexpected visitor.
274	7	"Jigsaw"	John Wells	Virgil Williams	November 9, 2006	2T7807	14.56
Ames is pursuing a hopeless quest to get an appeal hearing in his case. Hope goes behind Weaver's back to get free meds for a patient. Crenshaw and Lockhart get combative during an M&M session. When a combative patient returns later to the ER, he is a completely different person and has no memory of his earlier visit, and Morris has a good idea of what's going on but can't get anyone to believe him until Sam steps in to help. Kerry turns down an offer to be a TV medical reporter. Abby and Luka change their minds about hiring a nanny.
275	8	"Reason to Believe"	Ernest Dickerson	R. Scott Gemmill & David Zabel	November 16, 2006	2T7808	12.52
Three homeless kids come to the ER, one of whom presents with rabies and the doctors try extreme treatment to try to save him. An alcoholic is brought in unconscious after a bar fight the night before, hypoglycemic from lack of eating; his wife's injuries concern Kovač. Pratt and Gates have a confrontation over Gates' neglect of Pratt's orders. Tony explains his living situation to Neela. Greg finds Chaz and his boyfriend together and evicts Chaz from his apartment. Kerry is becoming dissatisfied with her reporter job. Greg ransacks the meds room for free samples to distribute at the church clinic.
276	9	"Scoop and Run"	Stephen Cragg	Lisa Zwerling	November 23, 2006	2T7809	13.04
It is Thanksgiving in the ER and Abby is called in for a transport by helicopter. The patient is unstable and ends up dying. Abby and the others in the helicopter then take over a new commission, a big car accident. She struggles to keep a little boy's mom alive who is stuck in a crashed bus. Meanwhile in the ER, Sam's son Alex is volunteering and keeps a patient, Lulu, company because her parents do not show up. Pratt turns to Kerry for advice on dealing with Chaz's sexuality. Neela decides to take things slow with Gates, yet she starts to make out with him.
277	10	"Tell Me No Secrets..."	Laura Innes	Karen Maser	November 30, 2006	2T7810	13.36
A teenage girl is found in front of her school, bleeding and apparently raped. As Kovač and Gates treat her, Abby and Neela try figure out the truth about what happened, while Kovač must help the girl's mother, a colleague. When the police are no help with Ames, Kovač decides to confront the problem. Abby's friend from Ike's returns. Pratt struggles to cope when his brother fully comes out. There is a new nurse on the floor, but can he handle the ER? Meanwhile, Ray's got a secret and Gates pours on the charm, but Neela's not impressed.
278	11	"City of Mercy"	Stephen Cragg	David Zabel & Lisa Zwerling	December 7, 2006	2T7812	12.02
It is Christmas in the ER. Kovač and Abby, as Rudolph and an elf, visit pediatrics, while Morris learns the meaning of Christmas when he plays Santa to a special girl. Ames takes action that creates tension between Kovač and Abby, leading Kovač to make a heartfelt confession. Teller returns, sending Gates and Ray on a mission, while Neela oversees an unusual kidney transplant case. Sam and Ben take a stand when a patient is dumped in an alley by Mercy Hospital. Morris gets an offer from Hope he can't refuse, but somehow does.
279	12	"Breach of Trust"	Skipp Sudduth	Janine Sherman Barrois	January 4, 2007	2T7811	10.93
Budget cuts force Kovač to make a difficult personnel decision. As word gets around the ER, emotions run high. Abby wonders if Kovač is keeping a secret. Pratt's efforts at community service lead to an unanticipated turn of events. Gates' home life intrudes on the ER, affecting Neela. Morris' missing credit card has Sam concerned. A patient Kerry is treating relates the horrifying story of her family's destruction in New Orleans during Hurricane Katrina.
280	13	"A House Divided"	Andrew Bernstein	R. Scott Gemmill	January 11, 2007	2T7813	12.18
Dr. Pratt differs with Rev. Watkins over the church clinic and faces a hearing before the board. Lockhart's concern for Eddie causes tension between her and Kovač on the job. Barnett bickers with Gates and Neela over the treatment of one of two boys injured in a snowmobiling accident; the father assumes it was the stepson's fault and the stepson doesn't tell him the real story, leading Ray to tell the stepfather the truth about what happened and also upbraid him for being worthless. Tony still hasn't told Sarah he's moving out. Alex falls deeper into sullen rebellion. Kerry says her goodbyes. Abby finds out who Eddie really is but her follow-up on that is cut short due to another crisis. NOTE: Final regular appearance of Dr. Kerry Weaver.
281	14	"Murmurs of the Heart"	Christopher Chulack	David Zabel	February 1, 2007	2T7814	11.79
Curtis Ames has broken into their apartment and threatens Abby and baby Joe with a gun, demanding that she call Kovač immediately. Once Luka arrives home, Ames takes him away at gunpoint and Abby immediately calls 911. Pratt has been arrested for his involvement in the church's medical clinic. Gates and Rasgotra respond to Sarah's call for help and find Meg unconscious with an unknown overdose. Alex accidentally sets the apartment on fire. In a moment of awareness, Meg tells Tony that he's Sarah's father before she dies.
282	15	"Dying Is Easy..."	Tawnia McKiernan	Janine Sherman Barrois	February 8, 2007	2T7815	11.53
The medical board suspends Pratt's license. Hope tries to own up to her involvement in the clinic, but Archie dissuades her. Rev. Watkins insists on accompanying Pratt to his board hearing. An aspiring stand-up comedian is desperate to get out of the ER for an important gig. Dubenko explains the new "exchange pool" for kidney transplants to Dr. Rasgotra, who is part of the surgical team. Sam's concern over Alex's worsening attitude problem grows. Things get more awkward between Neela and Tony.
283	16	"Crisis of Conscience"	Steve Shill	Lisa Zwerling	February 15, 2007	2T7816	11.60
Sam is overworked because some nurses are sick, others on vacation, etc. Gates and Kovač treat Anna Hayes (guest star Sean Young) who is vomiting and has an altered mental status. Sam is angry when a cop drops Alex at the ER after he stole quarters from a laundromat. Neela finds out unethical business is going on with the transplant program and blows the whistle on it. Ray takes action when he finds out the true story of how a shy cheerleader got seriously injured.
284	17	"From Here to Paternity"	Lesli Linka Glatter	Virgil Williams	February 22, 2007	2T7817	10.00
Sam is not in a good mood because of Alex. She is thinking of sending him away at a school for at-risk teens. Kovač, Morris, and Sam treat Mario Dustin, a 42-year-old ex-con who has been shot in the chest, along with Donnie, another injured man, and Mario's son Junior. Ray treats a man with a broken nose. Abby and Pratt work on the family that was trapped in a blizzard. Gates got a call that his drunk father is on a bender and was involved in a bar fight.
285	18	"Photographs and Memories"	Stephen Cragg	Karen Maser	April 12, 2007	2T7818	9.24
Kovač, Abby, Pratt, Morris, and the team treat the survivors of collision between a big-rig and family car, including the wife of the truck driver and the son of the car's driver. They suspect the truck driver was drunk but the real story is less criminal and even more tragic. Sam celebrates her birthday in the ER as she cares for a terminally ill photographer (Annabella Sciorra) who changes her outlook on life. Neela and Ray share some subtle signals. Gates is shadowed by a medical student who notices his errors. Wedding plans continue as Luka and Abby try to decide where to be married, but someone else is handling the bachelor party.
286	19	"Family Business"	Richard Thorpe	Joe Sachs	April 19, 2007	2T7819	9.31
While taking a self defense class, Sam hurts the teacher's knee. Kovač and Gates treat a patient whose father has Alzheimer's disease and can't remember the death of his son, which bring memories back to Kovač. Meanwhile, Abby becomes slightly paranoid about Joe's health when he catches a virus. Pratt tries to reconnect with his brother and tries to fix things, learning that Chaz is looking at a potential career in the paramedic department- which leads Pratt to ask Gates for advice. Gates and Sarah find out the truth about Gates' paternity test.
287	20	"Lights Out"	Terrence Nightingall	Janine Sherman Barrois	April 26, 2007	2T7820	9.52
A photographer named Diana goes back to the ER and notifies Sam that her cancer is spreading. Kovač needs to relocate all the staff to different departments of the hospital since the ER is forced to close. Chaz develops alcohol poisoning after he gets initiated by his EMT coworkers. Gates' father takes Sarah out to watch a movie and when they come back, Gates realizes that his dad has been drinking, which prompts Gates to pack his father's things and ask him to leave; they later get into a fistfight. Also, Kovač decides that he only wants to be a doctor and resigns as ER Chief.
288	21	"I Don't"	Andrew Bernstein	David Zabel	May 3, 2007	2T7822	7.78
The ER is closed for renovations and repairs. It's the night of the ER banquet, and Tony unexpectedly shows up to go with Neela. Luka reveals to Abby his secret agenda for the evening: a surprise wedding; Abby is less than thrilled at both the idea, and that Hope helped Luka plan the whole thing, but is finally persuaded. One last glitch – the Justice of the Peace can't make it and sends a replacement... a rabbi. Tensions between Tony and Ray over Neela reach a breaking point.
289	22	"Sea Change"	Laura Innes	Lisa Zwerling	May 10, 2007	2T7821	9.39
Since Luka and Abby are unable to use the honeymoon suite reserved for them (childcare issues) Archie and Hope take advantage of the opportunity to further their relationship. The ER is open once again and wait times are just as bad as ever, which Dr. Moretti, chief of the ICU and assigned to evaluate ER performance, finds unacceptable. Dubenko is conducting an internal audit of the post-op unit due to increased morbidity and mortality. Ray is MIA. A lawyer gives Tony reassurance he will be able to keep custody of Sarah.
290	23	"The Honeymoon Is Over"	Christopher Chulack	R. Scott Gemmill & David Zabel	May 17, 2007	2T7823	9.51
Luka leaves for Croatia to visit his ailing father. Ray is still MIA. Moretti has accepted the job of ER Chief and spends his first day auditing procedures. Gates loses his bid to get custody of Sarah (her grandparents arrive with legal documents demanding custody); he is left to assure a tearful Sarah that he will see her as often as he can. A drug-addicted Iraq War veteran turns out to have been an interpreter at torture sessions. Neela finally receives a call from a missing Ray's cell phone. She goes to see him in a hospital, only to find that he has had both of his legs amputated due to his accident. NOTE: Final regular appearance of Dr. Ray Barnett.
