= Michael Spellman =

Michael Spellman is the name of:

- Michael Spellman (actor), American actor
- Michael Spellman (footballer), English footballer
