= 56 Days =

2026 American thriller television series

- Genre: Thriller; Mystery; Drama
- Based on: 56 Days by Catherine Ryan Howard
- Developed by: Karyn Usher; Lisa Zwerling
- Starring: Avan Jogia; Dove Cameron; Karla Souza; Dorian Crossmond Missick
- Composer: Nathan Barr
- Country of origin: United States
- Original language: English
- No. of seasons: 1
- No. of episodes: 8

Production
- Executive producers: Karyn Usher; Lisa Zwerling; James Wan; Michael Clear; Rob Hackett; Sandrine Gros d'Aillon
- Running time: 43–53 minutes
- Production companies: Carpool Entertainment; Atomic Monster; Reunion Pacific Entertainment; Amazon MGM Studios

Original release
- Network: Amazon Prime Video
- Release: February 18, 2026

56 Days is an American thriller television series developed by Karyn Usher and Lisa Zwerling for Amazon Prime Video. Based on Catherine Ryan Howard's 2022 novel of the same name, and executive produced by James Wan, the series stars Avan Jogia, Dove Cameron, Karla Souza, and Dorian Crossmond Missick. It alternates between two timelines, following Oliver and Ciara's relationship after meeting in a supermarket, and 56 days later, when a corpse is found in their apartment with two detectives investigating the murder.

The series premiered on Amazon Prime Video on February 18, 2026.

== Premise ==
Oliver Kennedy (Avan Jogia) and Ciara Wyse (Dove Cameron) start an intense relationship after meeting in a supermarket. 56 days later, an unidentified body is found in Oliver's luxury apartment linked to him and Ciara. Detectives Lee Reardon (Karla Souza) and Karl Connolly (Dorian Crossmond Missick) reconstruct the couple's deadly romance across the past 56 days, trying to uncover what happened.

It is ultimately revealed that Ciara's real name is Megan, and that she had initiated the relationship with Oliver to exact revenge on him for the death of her brother, Shane, who committed suicide in prison after being convicted of a murder for which Oliver was responsible. Over the course of the series, Megan realizes that Oliver is genuinely remorseful, and she falls in love with him. The body in the apartment turns out to be Oliver's manipulative therapist Dan Troxler, who had trapped Shane into committing suicide; Megan killed Dan in self-defense. The series ends with Megan and Oliver still together, having had a child named Shane.

== Cast and characters ==
=== Main ===
- Dove Cameron as Ciara Wyse / Megan Martin
- Avan Jogia as Oliver Kennedy / Oliver St. Ledger
- Karla Souza as Lee Reardon
- Dorian Crossmond Missick as Karl Connolly

=== Recurring ===
- Alfredo Narciso as Elliot Berhane
- Jesse James Keitel as Alison Meadows
- Patch Darragh as Dan Troxler
- Megan Peta Hill as Shyla Martin
- Kira Guloien as Jane Miller
- Matt Murray as Kevin Sullivan
- David Klein as Declan Kelly
- Jennifer Ferrin as Kristi Martin
- Dylan Colton as Linus Finch
- Celeste Oliva as Camille Russo

== Episodes ==
No.	Title	Directed by	Teleplay by	Original release date
1	"Chapter 1"	Alethea Jones	Karyn Usher & Lisa Zwerling	February 18, 2026
Working class Ciara begins to fall for rich, handsome Oliver after a chance encounter. 56 days later, Detectives Lee and Karl encounter a gruesome homicide. Did Ciara and Oliver's highly-charged romance end in murder?
2	"Chapter 2"	Alethea Jones	Karyn Usher & Lisa Zwerling	February 18, 2026
Oliver rushes headlong into a romance with Ciara despite red flags on both sides. Karl spots Lee in a mysterious encounter with a suspect while they work to investigate the identity of both the victim and the killer.
3	"Chapter 3"	Shana Stein	Karyn Usher & Lisa Zwerling	February 18, 2026
Oliver's paranoia grows when Ciara moves into his upscale apartment. Lee keeps a secret from Karl, but makes a key discovery in the search for the killer.
4	"Chapter 4"	Shana Stein	Janet Lin	February 18, 2026
Oliver and Ciara's twisted romance intensifies as she gets closer to accessing his multi-million dollar fortune. Lee admits the truth about Linus Finch while she and Karl track down a stalker.
5	"Chapter 5"	Lauren Wolkstein	Brandon K. Hines	February 18, 2026
In the midst of a city-wide holiday celebration, altered states and a prying journalist push Oliver and Ciara to their breaking point. Lee and Karl circle a new suspect as they close in on the identity of the body in the bathtub.
6	"Chapter 6"	Lauren Wolkstein	Michael Broady	February 18, 2026
Oliver spirals as Shyla forces Ciara to make a hard decision. Karl and Lee confront personal demons that threaten their partnership.
7	"Chapter 7"	Jessica Yu	Alexandra Cunningham	February 18, 2026
The incident at Narrow River sends shockwaves through Oliver and Ciara's lives. Lee and Karl discover the truth, but face brutal consequences.
8	"Chapter 8"	Jessica Yu	Karyn Usher & Lisa Zwerling	February 18, 2026
Karl and Lee put together some final pieces to truly understand everything about Oliver and Ciara's intense, charged and fatal love affair.

== Production ==
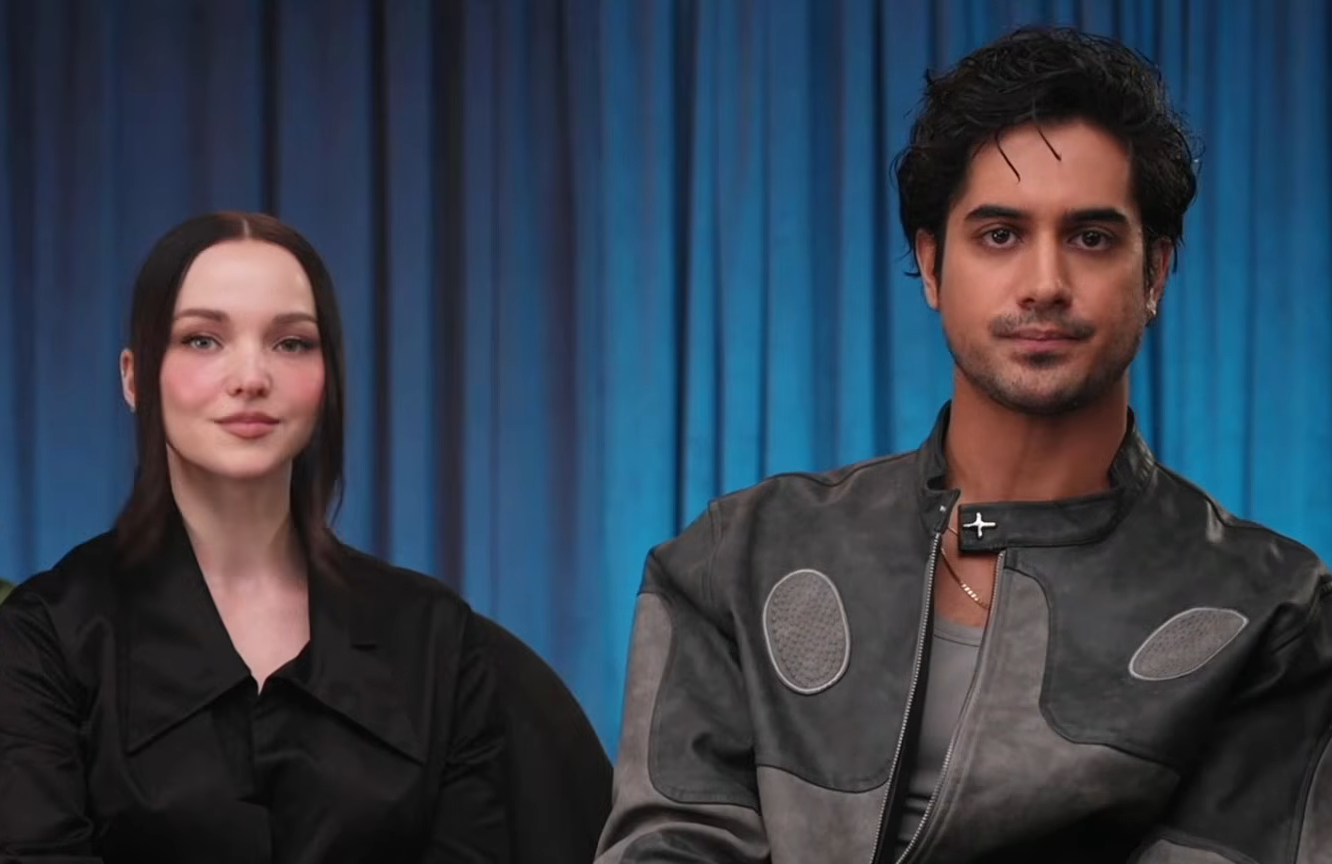
Dove Cameron with Avan Jogia promoting 56 Days in 2026

The series is produced by Amazon MGM Studios and Atomic Monster and was commissioned in December 2023. The series is written and executive-produced by Lisa Zwerling and Karyn Usher. James Wan is one of the executive producers, along with Michael Clear and Rob Hackett at Atomic Monster. Nathan Barr composed the score for the series. Multiples changes were made for the series, with the setting from the novel changed from Dublin to Boston. The other major change is that the novel takes place during the COVID-19 pandemic, with Oliver suggesting that Ciara spend the lockdown at his place; however, the pandemic's storyline was removed for the adaptation.

In May 2024, Avan Jogia and Dove Cameron were cast in the lead roles of Oliver Kennedy and Ciara Wyse. In June 2024, Karla Souza, Megan Peta Hill, Dorian Crossmond Missick, Patch Darragh, Kira Guloien, Celeste Oliva, Jesse James Keitel, and Matt Murray joined the cast.

Filming took place in Montreal in June 2024.

== Release ==
56 Days premiered on February 18, 2026, with all eight episodes released simultaneously on Amazon Prime Video.

== Reception ==
On the review aggregator website Rotten Tomatoes, the series holds an approval rating of 60% based on 30 reviews. The website's critics consensus reads, "56 Days almost overstays its welcome with this snoozy mystery, but its central conceit is saved by two utterly beguiling performances." Metacritic, which uses a weighted average, gave it a score of 55 out of 100 based on 11 critics, indicating "mixed or average" reviews.
