= Criminal Minds season 13 =

Season of television series Criminal Minds

Criminal Minds
- Season 13
- Season 13 U.S. DVD cover
- Starring: Joe Mantegna; Matthew Gray Gubler; A. J. Cook; Kirsten Vangsness; Aisha Tyler; Daniel Henney; Adam Rodriguez; Paget Brewster
- No. of episodes: 22

Release
- Original network: CBS
- Original release: September 27, 2017 – April 18, 2018

Season chronology
- ← Previous; Season 12 Next → Season 14

The thirteenth season of Criminal Minds was ordered on April 7, 2017, by CBS with an order of 22 episodes. The season premiered on September 27, 2017 in a new time slot, at 10:00 p.m. on Wednesday, when it had previously been at 9:00 p.m. on Wednesday since its inception. The season concluded on April 18, 2018.

== Cast ==
The entire main cast from the previous season returned for the season, except Damon Gupton (Stephen Walker), who was written out of the show. His character was killed off in the season premiere off-screen.

Following the cancellation of Criminal Minds: Beyond Borders, it was announced that Daniel Henney (Matt Simmons) would join the cast this season as a series regular.

=== Main ===
- Joe Mantegna as Supervisory Special Agent David Rossi (BAU Senior Agent)
- Matthew Gray Gubler as Supervisory Special Agent Dr. Spencer Reid (BAU Agent)
- A. J. Cook as Supervisory Special Agent Jennifer "JJ" Jareau (BAU Agent)
- Kirsten Vangsness as Special Agent Penelope Garcia (BAU Technical Analyst & Co-Communications Liaison)
- Aisha Tyler as Supervisory Special Agent Dr. Tara Lewis (BAU Agent)
- Daniel Henney as Supervisory Special Agent Matt Simmons (BAU Agent)
- Adam Rodriguez as Supervisory Special Agent Luke Alvez (BAU Agent)
- Paget Brewster as Supervisory Special Agent Emily Prentiss (BAU Unit Chief & Co-Communications Liaison)

=== Special guest star ===
- Shemar Moore as Derek Morgan, Former FBI BAU Agent

=== Recurring ===
- Josh Stewart as William "Will" LaMontagne Jr.
- Kelly Frye as Kristy Simmons
- Declan Whaley as David Simmons
- Kim Rhodes as FBI Assistant Director Linda Barnes

=== Guest ===
- Bodhi Elfman as Peter Lewis / Mr. Scratch
- Tracie Thoms as Monica Walker
- Jamie Kennedy as Floyd Feylinn Ferell
- Corey Reynolds as Phil Brooks
- Zelda Williams as Melissa Miller
- Lou Diamond Phillips as Sheriff Clifford
- Daniella Alonso as Lisa Douglas
- Gail O'Grady as Krystall Richards
- Danielle C. Ryan as Portia Richards
- Sebastian Sozzi as Carlos Garcia
- James Urbaniak as FBI Special Agent Owen Quinn
- Karen David as FBI Special Agent Mary Meadows
- Michael Hogan as Benjamin David Merva
- Ben Browder as Chief Steve Gaines

== Production ==
=== Development ===
Criminal Minds was renewed for a thirteenth season with an episode order of 22 episodes on April 7, 2017. The entire main cast from the previous season returned for the season, except Damon Gupton (Stephen Walker), who was leaving from the show.

Matthew Gray Gubler directed the seventeenth episode of the season and it was said to be "the spookiest episode of Season 13" and involved clowns. On August 10, 2017, it was revealed that Aisha Tyler will make her television directing debut and direct the sixth episode of the season. On August 12, 2017 it was revealed that Erica Messer and Kirsten Vangsness will be co-writing the eleventh episode of the season, which will be the fourth episode they have co-written together. On October 31, 2017, it was announced that Adam Rodriguez will make his Criminal Minds directing debut and direct the sixteenth episode of the season.

=== Casting ===
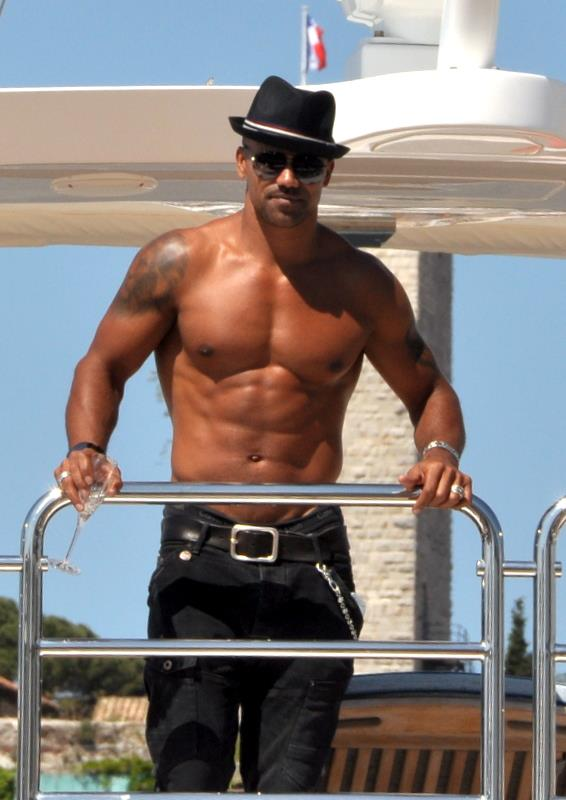
Shemar Moore reprised his role as Derek Morgan in the fifth episode.

On June 11, 2017, it was announced that Damon Gupton had been let go from the show after one season. CBS said his departure was "part of a creative change on the show".

On June 20, 2017, CBS announced that Daniel Henney, who was a series regular on Criminal Minds: Beyond Borders as Matt Simmons, would join the main show as a series regular for the thirteenth season.

On October 12, 2017, it was announced that Shemar Moore would reprise his role as Derek Morgan in the fifth episode of the season ("Lucky Strikes"). His character returned to help Penelope Garcia get through a tough time.

== Episodes ==
No. overall	No. in season	Title	Directed by	Written by	Original release date	Prod. code	U.S. viewers (millions)
278	1	"Wheels Up"	Glenn Kershaw	Breen Frazier	September 27, 2017	1301	7.00
When escaped serial killer Peter Lewis (Bodhi Elfman) launches a devastating final assault on the BAU, killing one of their own and taking another hostage in the process, Garcia brings in former FBI International Response Team member Matt Simmons (Daniel Henney) to help apprehend Lewis before more lives are lost.
279	2	"To a Better Place"	Diana C. Valentine	Bruce Zimmerman	October 4, 2017	1302	6.17
When two women from Naples, Florida are found stuffed inside suitcases after being strangled to death and both crimes are connected to the discovery of an unidentifiable female corpse, the BAU returns from their mandatory vacation to determine what connects the three victims. Meanwhile, Reid learns about a condition to his reinstatement and the team welcomes Simmons into the fold.
280	3	"Blue Angel"	Sharat Raju	Christopher Barbour	October 11, 2017	1304	5.87
When two businessmen in Detroit, Michigan are tortured, emasculated and posed post-mortem, the BAU juggles searching for a former escort who was involved with both victims and tracking down an anger-driven serial killer.
281	4	"Killer App"	Alec Smight	Stephanie Sengupta	October 18, 2017	1303	5.94
When a workplace shooting claims the lives of three employees at a Silicon Valley video gaming company, the BAU works with the Department of Homeland Security to determine why the victims were targeted. Meanwhile, Prentiss confronts Alvez about the events surrounding his final confrontation with Peter Lewis.
282	5	"Lucky Strikes"	Tawnia McKiernan	Jim Clemente	October 25, 2017	1306	5.91
When a Floridian prostitute is found dead with both legs severed and several fingers cut off, the BAU sets out to determine if cannibalistic killer Floyd Feylinn Ferell (Jamie Kennedy) has embarked on another spree or if a copycat killer is framing him. Meanwhile, former SSA Derek Morgan (Shemar Moore) visits Garcia after she becomes overwhelmed by memories of a ten-year-old trauma.
283	6	"The Bunker"	Aisha Tyler	Karen Maser	November 8, 2017	1305	5.50
When a chef from Richmond, Virginia mysteriously disappears from her place of work, the BAU sets out to connect the abduction to a series of missing persons cases in both Richmond and Culpeper. Meanwhile, JJ connects with a potential victim's sister and Garcia searches for a new apartment.
284	7	"Dust and Bones"	Marcus Stokes	Erica Meredith	November 15, 2017	1307	5.64
When three women from Austin, Texas are tortured and disfigured, the BAU sets out to identify a serial abductor obsessed with a venomous creature. Meanwhile, Alvez tries to help his former Fugitive Task Force partner come to terms with his paralysis.
285	8	"Neon Terror"	Bethany Rooney	Erik Stiller	November 22, 2017	1308	6.31
When the third in a series of robbery-homicides takes place in Miami, Florida and two daters are gunned down on the same night, the BAU sets out to profile a spree killer who films the crimes as he commits them before releasing the footage to the media.
286	9	"False Flag"	Joe Mantegna	Breen Frazier	December 6, 2017	1309	5.34
When two members of a Roswell, New Mexico conspiracy theory group die in quick succession, the BAU determines both crimes were committed by a budding serial killer only to find themselves reexamining the evidence after a catastrophic event. Meanwhile, Lewis struggles to keep her emotions in check as she interrogates a young podcaster (Zelda Williams) with ties to the group.
287	10	"Submerged"	Rob Bailey	Bruce Zimmerman	January 3, 2018	1310	5.41
When a couple living in Ramona, California is killed in their home and the crime is connected to two perplexing robbery-homicides, the BAU works with a frustrated sheriff (Lou Diamond Phillips) to profile a delusional serial killer with mysterious motives and an equally mysterious past.
288	11	"Full-Tilt Boogie"	Simon Mirren	Erica Messer & Kirsten Vangsness	January 10, 2018	1311	5.70
When a Virginian police chief's wife is hospitalized after surviving a brutal home invasion-homicide, the BAU coordinates with local authorities to identify her attempted killer only to unearth a series of dark secrets being kept by the inhabitants of a rural town.
289	12	"Bad Moon on the Rise"	Christoph Schrewe	Karen Maser	January 17, 2018	1312	5.63
When a New York City jogger is disemboweled and his death is connected to a series of gruesome murder-mutilations, the BAU searches for a killer suffering from a bizarre condition. Meanwhile, Alvez deals with the fallout of a blind date gone wrong.
290	13	"Cure"	Glenn Kershaw	Christopher Barbour	January 24, 2018	1313	5.30
When a businessman in Washington, D.C. is stabbed to death in his office and a mysterious cryptogram is found lodged in his throat, the BAU sets out to catch a serial killer determined to eradicate institutions of power. Meanwhile, JJ grows concerned after receiving an email asking her to sit down with Assistant Director Linda Barnes (Kim Rhodes).
291	14	"Miasma"	Leon Ichaso	Erica Meredith	January 31, 2018	1314	5.42
When local authorities uncover a mass grave in a New Orleans cemetery, the BAU searches for a killer who sees himself as a modern-day plague doctor. Meanwhile, Prentiss finds herself forced to endure a hostile interrogation after Barnes suspends her from active duty and summons her for an internal audit.
292	15	"Annihilator"	Rob Bailey	Erik Stiller	March 7, 2018	1315	5.04
With Prentiss still suspended and Reid refusing to work without her, Barnes takes the lead and joins the remaining members of the BAU as they search St. Louis, Missouri for the perpetrator of a quadruple homicide. Meanwhile, Reid attempts to dissuade Prentiss from making a bold decision.
293	16	"Last Gasp"	Adam Rodriguez	Stephanie Sengupta	March 14, 2018	1316	5.69
In the wake of Barnes' attempt to restructure the BAU, the divided team works behind her back to track down and identify a serial abductor who photographs high-class call girls from Washington, D.C. before shooting them and incinerating their bodies.
294	17	"The Capilanos"	Matthew Gray Gubler	Erica Messer	March 21, 2018	1317	5.26
When a Guymon, Oklahoma man is stabbed to death during a home invasion and his seven-year-old son claims a man dressed as a circus clown killed him, the BAU attempts to determine if the child's statement is true or not.
295	18	"The Dance of Love"	Joe Mantegna	Bruce Zimmerman	March 28, 2018	1318	6.59
When two women in Chicago, Illinois are stabbed to death on consecutive nights and found with a red rose in their mouths, the BAU searches for a serial killer with unexpected motives. Meanwhile, Rossi takes personal time off after receiving a phone call from his third ex-wife Krystall (Gail O'Grady).
296	19	"Ex Parte"	Lily Mariye	Christopher Barbour	April 4, 2018	1319	5.90
When three gunmen break into a Washington, D.C. law firm and take the employees hostage, the BAU sets out to determine the perpetrators' underlying motives before the situation can escalate any further. Meanwhile, Simmons becomes emotionally involved after discovering that his wife, Kristy (Kelly Frye), is among the hostages.
297	20	"All You Can Eat"	Diana C. Valentine	Karen Maser	April 11, 2018	1320	5.20
When two people spontaneously bleed to death in Arlington, Virginia over the course of twenty-four hours and the CDC suspects bioterrorism, the BAU juggles identifying the killer and preventing a large-scale incident from taking place. Meanwhile, Garcia reunites with her stepbrother after learning that the drunk driver who killed their parents is eligible for parole.
298	21	"Mixed Signals"	Alec Smight	Erica Meredith & Erik Stiller	April 18, 2018	1321	5.92
When two Taos, New Mexico residents are blitz attacked and later found dead with holes drilled into the left temporal lobes of their brains, the BAU determines they are searching for a serial killer obsessed with proving that an inexplicable collection of phenomena exists.
299	22	"Believer"	Glenn Kershaw	Breen Frazier	April 18, 2018	1322	5.39
When Reid receives a cryptic message leading him to a disgraced VICAP agent locked inside a Washington, D.C. storage unit, the BAU investigates his claims of an active serial killer nicknamed "The Strangler" only to find themselves questioning everything they think they know after making a shattering revelation.

== Ratings ==
Viewership and ratings per episode of Criminal Minds season 13
No.	Title	Air date	Rating/share (18–49)	Viewers (millions)	DVR (18–49)	DVR viewers (millions)	Total (18–49)	Total viewers (millions)
1	"Wheels Up"	September 27, 2017	1.3/5	7.00	1.1	4.15	2.4	11.15
2	"To a Better Place"	October 4, 2017	1.1/4	6.17	1.1	3.98	2.2	10.15
3	"Blue Angel"	October 11, 2017	1.1/4	5.87	1.0	3.82	2.1	9.68
4	"Killer App"	October 18, 2017	1.0/4	5.94	1.1	3.87	2.1	9.81
5	"Lucky Strikes"	October 25, 2017	1.0/4	5.91	1.0	3.81	2.0	9.72
6	"The Bunker"	November 8, 2017	0.9/3	5.50	1.0	3.53	1.9	9.03
7	"Dust and Bones"	November 15, 2017	1.0/4	5.64	1.0	3.76	2.0	9.40
8	"Neon Terror"	November 22, 2017	1.0/4	6.31	1.0	3.70	2.0	10.00
9	"False Flag"	December 6, 2017	0.9/4	5.34	1.1	4.04	2.0	9.38
10	"Submerged"	January 3, 2018	0.9/3	5.41	1.1	3.93	2.0	9.37
11	"Full-Tilt Boogie"	January 10, 2018	1.0/4	5.70	1.1	4.13	2.1	9.83
12	"Bad Moon on the Rise"	January 17, 2018	1.0/4	5.63	1.1	4.02	2.1	9.65
13	"Cure"	January 24, 2018	0.9/3	5.30	1.1	4.12	2.0	9.42
14	"Miasma"	January 31, 2018	1.0/4	5.42	1.0	3.90	2.0	9.32
15	"Annihilator"	March 7, 2018	0.9/3	5.05	1.0	4.06	1.9	9.11
16	"Last Gasp"	March 14, 2018	0.9/4	5.69	1.2	4.16	2.1	9.85
17	"The Capilanos"	March 21, 2018	0.9/4	5.26	1.1	3.94	2.0	9.20
18	"The Dance of Love"	March 28, 2018	1.1/5	6.59	0.9	3.54	2.0	10.13
19	"Ex Parte"	April 4, 2018	1.0/4	5.90	1.0	3.71	2.0	9.62
20	"All You Can Eat"	April 11, 2018	0.9/4	5.20	1.0	3.94	1.9	9.14
21	"Mixed Signals"	April 18, 2018	1.0/4	5.92	0.8	3.05	1.8	8.97
22	"Believer"	April 18, 2018	0.9/4	5.39	0.8	3.35	1.7	8.74

== Home media ==
The Complete Thirteenth Season
Set details		Special features
22 episodes; 6-disc set (Region 1); 5-disc set (Region 2 & 4); Aspect Ratio: 1.78:1; Subtitles: English; English: Dolby Digital 5.1		Getting Lucky; Bunker Mentality; Breaking Up The BAU; The Table Read: Mixed Signals; Thirteen Minds; Would You Make A Good FBI Agent?; Pilot Episode of "SEAL Team"; Pilot Episode of "Bull"; Gag Reel; Deleted Scenes
DVD release date
Region 1	Region 2	Region 4
August 28, 2018	December 3, 2018	TBA
