= Karen Maser =

American television writer and producer

Karen Maser is an American television writer and producer. She has worked extensively on the NBC medical drama ER and the CBS crime drama Criminal Minds.

== Biography ==
Maser began her television career as a freelance writer. She wrote an episode of Cosby entitled "The Perfect Valentine" in 2000. She wrote an episode for the eleventh season of ER in 2005 entitled "You Are Here". She also contributed an episode to the twelfth season entitled "Out on a Limb".

She was hired as a staff writer for the thirteenth season of ER. As a permanent crew member she wrote two further episodes - "Tell Me No Secrets" and "Photographs and Memories". She returned as a story editor for the fourteenth season. She wrote three episodes personally - "In A Different Light", "Skye's The Limit", and "Truth Will Out". She was promoted to executive story editor part way through the fourteenth season. She joined the production team as a co-producer for the fifteenth and final season. She wrote the episode "Haunted".

In 2015, Maser was hired as a writer and co-executive producer at the start of the eleventh Season of Criminal Minds. She wrote two episodes for the eleventh season ("'Til Death Do Us Part" and "Drive") and she wrote three episodes for the twelfth Season ("Taboo", "Scarecrow" and "Alpha Male").

== Filmography ==
=== Producer ===
Year	Show	Role	Notes
2015–2018	Criminal Minds	Co-executive producer	Season 13; Season 12; Season 11
2008	ER	Co-producer	Season 15
2008	ER	Executive story editor	Season 14
2007	ER	Story editor	Season 14
2007	ER	Staff Writer	Season 13
2006	ER	Staff Writer	Season 13

=== Writer ===
Year	Show	Episode	Notes
2018	Criminal Minds	"All You Can Eat"	Season 13, episode 20
2018	Criminal Minds	"Bad Moon on the Rise"	Season 13, episode 12
2017	Criminal Minds	"The Bunker"	Season 13, episode 5
2017	Criminal Minds	"Alpha Male"	Season 12, episode 15
2016	Criminal Minds	"Scarecrow"	Season 12, episode 8
2016	Criminal Minds	"Taboo"	Season 12, episode 3
2016	Criminal Minds	"Drive"	Season 11, episode 12
2015	Criminal Minds	"'Til Death Do Us Part"	Season 11, episode 3
2008	ER	"Haunted"	Season 15, episode 5
2008	ER	"Truth Will Out"	Season 14, episode 16
2007	ER	"Skye's The Limit"	Season 14, episode 9
2007	ER	"In A Different Light"	Season 14, episode 2
2007	ER	"Photographs and Memories"	Season 13, episode 18
2006	ER	"Tell Me No Secrets"	Season 13, episode 10
2005	ER	"Out on a Limb"	Season 12, episode 16
2004	ER	"You Are Here"	Season 11, episode 20
2000	Cosby	"The Perfect Valentine"	Season 4, episode 16

== Awards/Nominations ==
Maser won a 2008 Prism Award.
