= Michael Spellman (actor) =

American actor

- Born: Michael Kevin Spellman; November 19, 1978 (age 46); Detroit, Michigan, United States
- Occupation: Actor
- Years active: 2003–present

Michael Spellman (born November 19, 1978) is an American film, television and stage actor. He appeared in the movie Charlie Wilson's War and on the TV shows How I Met Your Mother, ER and Lie to Me.
