= Deezer D =

American actor (1965–2021)

- Born: Dearon Thompson; March 10, 1965; Los Angeles, California, U.S.
- Died: January 7, 2021 (aged 55); Los Angeles, California, U.S.
- Occupations: Actor; Rapper; Motivational speaker
- Years active: 1991–2021

Dearon Thompson (March 10, 1965 – January 7, 2021), known professionally as Deezer D, was an American actor, rapper and Christian motivational speaker. He is best known for his role as Nurse Malik McGrath in the American medical drama television series ER, and for his roles in the films CB4 and Fear of a Black Hat.

Deezer D's album Delayed, But Not Denied was available on iTunes, and from his website on August 8, 2008. Previously, he released Unpredictable (2002) and Living Up in a Down World (1999), with plans to produce new music in 2021.

At the age of 55, Thompson suffered a fatal heart attack in his Los Angeles home on January 7, 2021.

== Filmography ==
=== Film ===
Year	Title	Role	Notes
1991	Cool as Ice	Jazz	
1993	Fear of a Black Hat	Jam Boy	
1993	CB4	Otis / Stab Master Arson	
1996	The Great White Hype	Roper's crony	
1997	Romy and Michele's High School Reunion	Service guy	
2001	Bones	Stank	
2003	Bringing Down the House	Heavy guy	
2005	In the Mix	Joe "JoJo"	
2006	The Way Back Home	LV Perry	
2007	Lord Help Us	Tai Williams	
2011	Raven	Raven	Short film
2013	Under the Sun Restored	Natas Pitts	Short film
2017	Crowning Jules	Pawnbroker	
2021	Courting Mom and Dad	Jim Calloway	

=== Television ===
Year	Title	Role	Notes
1992	Angel Street	Malik	2 episodes
1992	Out All Night	D.J.	Episode: "Pilot"
1992	A Different World	Background Extra	2 episodes
1993	The John Larroquette Show	The Robber	Episode: "Pilot"
1994–2009	ER	Malik McGrath	190 episodes
1995	Hope & Gloria	Orderly	Episode: "Manager and Woman"
2000	The Rosie O'Donnell Show	Self	Episode: "Rosie's Backstage Pass: ER"
2005	Unscripted	Self	1 episode

=== Video games ===
Year	Title	Role
2001	Emergency Room: Code Red	Boogy

=== Web series ===
Year	Title	Role	Notes
2009	Star-ving	Raheem	Episode: "Straight Outta Compton"
