= Montae Russell =

American actor

- Born: Pittsburgh, Pennsylvania
- Occupation: Actor

Montae Russell (sometimes credited as Monté Russell) is an American actor of stage, television and film, best known for his many performances on episodic television, which include his role as Dwight Zadro from the NBC television series ER.
