= Lisa Zwerling =

American physician and television writer

- Occupation: Television Writer
- Writing career
- Notable works: ER; The Rook; 56 Days

Lisa Zwerling is an American physician, television writer and producer. She joined the writing staff of the acclaimed medical series ER in season ten and over the next six seasons wrote twenty-three episodes and rose to the level of co-executive producer. She went on to write and produce the sci-fi series Flashforward before signing an overall deal in 2010 with Universal Television. While at Universal, she wrote and executive produced the medical pilot Weekends At Bellevue starring Lauren Ambrose and mystery-thriller pilot Midnight Sun starring Julia Stiles. In 2013, she signed an overall deal at ABC Studios where she wrote and executive produced the relationship drama Betrayal.

In 2016, Zwerling and Karyn Usher signed a multi-year overall television deal with Lionsgate to develop and produce original scripted programming through their new company, Carpool Entertainment. Usher and Zwerling had previously worked together at John Wells Productions before reuniting to form the company. At Lionsgate, along with Carpool Entertainment VP of Development Amanda Tudesco, they developed projects at AMC, HBO, Showtime and Hulu. Usher and Zwerling also executive produced the spy thriller series The Rook, starring Emma Greenwell, Adrian Lester, Joely Richardson and Olivia Munn and shot in London, UK via their Carpool Entertainment production company. It aired on Starz in the U.S. and across Liberty Global's international platforms in 2019.

In 2019, Usher and Zwerling's Carpool Entertainment signed a deal at Universal Television, a division of NBCUniversal Content Studios. From there, they went on to write and executive produce limited series 56 Days, produced by Amazon MGM Studios and James Wan's Atomic Monster based on Catherine Ryan Howard's 2021 bestseller of the same title. The series, starring Dove Cameron, Avan Jogia, Karla Souza and Dorian Crossmond Missick received mixed reviews from critics but a warm audience reception, quickly rising to the No.1 position globally on the Amazon platform five days after its release on February 18, 2026.
