= Dinah Lenney =

American actress and writer

Dinah Lenney (née Gross; born November 18, 1956) is an American actress and writer. She is the author of Bigger than Life: A Murder, a Memoir, a 2007 book about the murder of her father, Republican Party politician and businessman Nelson G. Gross.

== Biography ==
Lenney was born in New York City to Nelson G. Gross and Leah (née Binger) Gross. Her parents divorced in 1958, after which time she lived with her mother, who remarried Ron Lenney. Her surname was legally changed from Gross to Lenney around her sixteenth birthday. She attended Yale University, graduating with a B.A. degree in American Studies in 1978. She received a Certificate of Acting from the Neighborhood Playhouse, where she studied with Sanford Meisner. She also holds a Master of Fine Arts in creative nonfiction from the Bennington Writing Seminars.

In her acting career, Lenney has had a variety of stage, film, and television roles. On television she has appeared on shows such as Married... with Children (1991), Murphy Brown, Judging Amy, A Fine Romance and South of Nowhere. Beginning in 1995 she played a recurring role on ER as Nurse Shirley. In 2006 she coauthored the book Acting for Young Actors with Mary Lou Belli.

In 2007 University of Nebraska Press published her memoir, Bigger than Life: A Murder, a Memoir, which recounts her experience of learning that her father, Nelson G. Gross, had been kidnapped and murdered in September 1997.

Her book The Object Parade, a collection of 32 personal essays which first appeared in publications including Creative Nonfiction, AGNI and the Harvard Review, was first published in 2014. Writing in the Los Angeles Review of Books, Ned Stuckey-French described The Object Parade as an "essay collection [disguised] as a memoir, though perhaps it's the other way around."

== Family ==
Lenney is married to screenwriter/producer Fred Mills; the couple have two children, Jake and Eliza.
