= Parminder Nagra =

British actress (born 1975)

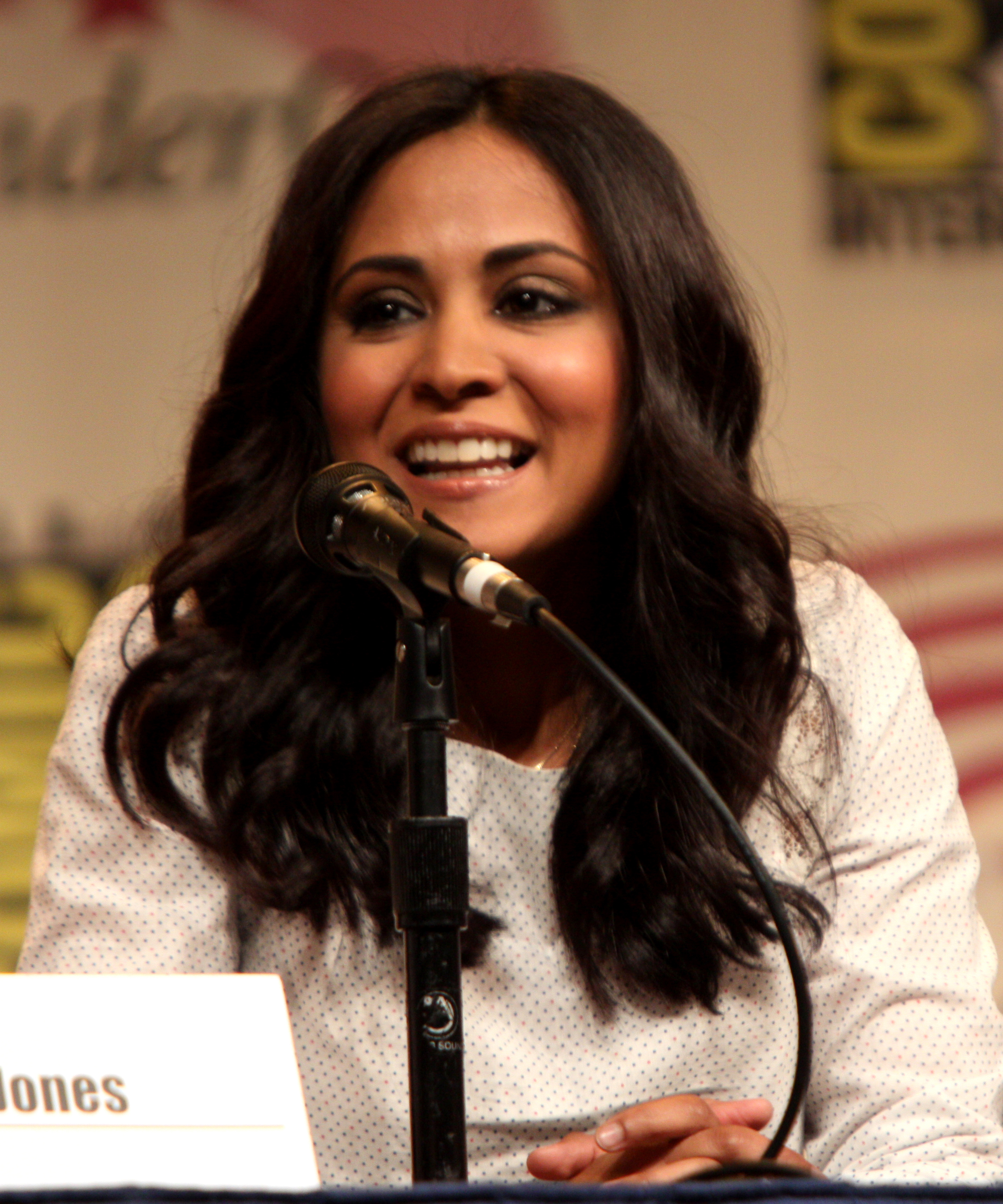
- Nagra at WonderCon in 2012
- Born: Parminder Kaur Nagra; 5 October 1975 (age 50); Leicester, England
- Occupation: Actress
- Years active: 1991–present
- Spouse: James Stenson (m. 2009; div. 2013)
- Partner: Kieran Creggan (1996–2000)
- Children: 1

Parminder Kaur Nagra (born 5 October 1975) is a British actress. She gained prominence through her roles as Jess Bhamra in the film Bend It Like Beckham (2002) and Dr. Neela Rasgotra in the NBC medical drama ER (2003–2009). Her other television roles include Meera Malik in the first season of the NBC crime drama The Blacklist (2013–2014) and a recurring role as Ellen Nadeer in season four of the ABC/Marvel series Agents of S.H.I.E.L.D. (2016–2017). More recently, Nagra starred as the titular character of the ITV series DI Ray (2022–2024).

== Early life and education ==
Parminder Kaur Nagra was born on 5 October 1975 in Leicester, Leicestershire, to Sukha and Nashuter Nagra, who emigrated from India in the 1960s. Her parents separated when she was a young child.

Nagra attended Soar Valley College.

A few months after sitting her A-levels and leaving school, Nagra was approached by Jez Simons, her former drama instructor, about becoming part of the Leicester-based theatre company Haithizi Productions, for which he served as the artistic director. She accepted and was cast as a chorus member in the 1994 musical Nimai, presented at the Haymarket Theatre in Leicester. Only a week into rehearsals, she was switched from the chorus to replace the lead actress, who had dropped out. Simons recalls that Nagra, a good singer and actress, also had a quality that raised her above other actresses which led him to select her as the new lead, despite the inconvenience of performing with her arm in a cast.

== Career ==
=== 1990s to early 2000s ===
Nagra left Leicester for London and decided not to go to university. Instead she pursued her childhood ambition of becoming an actress. Nagra's first London theatrical job came in 1994, when she was cast as the Princess in the pantomime Sleeping Beauty at the Theatre Royal Stratford East. After Sleeping Beauty, Nagra worked with small Indian theatre companies such as Tara Arts and Tamasha. These roles eventually led to radio and television appearances that defined her career throughout most of the 1990s.

Nagra appeared in "The 6th Wonder of the World: The Kali Tutti Story", in 1994. In 1996, Nagra took a small part in Chikamatsu Monzaemon's Fair Ladies at a Game of Poem Cards that was performed at Cottesloe, Royal National Theatre.

Despite lacking formal theatrical training, Nagra signed with Joan Brown, a veteran London-based agent, after which she was cast in minor television roles in the British medical drama series Casualty, and in the made-for-television film King Girl, in which she played an abusive member of an all-girl gang. In 1997, Nagra appeared in the three-part drama Turning World alongside Roshan Seth.

The following year, she appeared on Casualty again. In 1999, she played a convenience store clerk in the television film Donovan Quick, opposite Colin Firth. Also of note were appearances on the British comedy Goodness Gracious Me. Nagra also co-starred in radio plays including, among others, plays by Tanika Gupta. In 1998, Nagra co-starred in the radio play Dancing Girls of Lahore which was co-written by her future Bend It Like Beckham co-star Shaheen Khan.

Nagra's other notable stage roles during this period include:

- Skeleton (1997), with critical acclaim for her "bright-eyed vivacity" as the village girl
- A Tainted Dawn (1997) where she played a Hindu boy accidentally left in Pakistan and brought up by a Muslim couple
- Fourteen Songs, Two Weddings & A Funeral (1998) where she showed her skills as a romantic comedian, also to critical acclaim
- Krishna's Lila—A Play of the Asian World (1999) where she was part of a five-person cast in a controversially titled piece
- The Square Circle (1999) in the demanding role of an illiterate peasant girl who becomes a rape victim
- River on Fire (2000), as Kiran, in a retelling of Sophocles' Antigone

In 2001, Nagra voiced a Muslim girl in the docu-drama Arena: The Veil about women who choose to wear the Muslim head scarf. In 1997, not long after Fair Ladies at a Game of Poem Cards, Nagra was cast in Oh Sweet Sita, an adaptation of Indian mythology about Rama and his wife Sita, in the title role of Sita. During that time, Nagra caught the attention of director Gurinder Chadha.

=== Bend It Like Beckham (2002) ===
Nagra played the lead role in Gurinder Chadha's 2002 comedy-drama Bend It Like Beckham, which became her breakthrough film, alongside Jonathan Rhys Meyers, Anupam Kher, Archie Panjabi, Shaheen Khan, and Keira Knightley, for whom this film also became a career breakthrough. Nagra played Jesminder "Jess" Bhamra, a teenage Sikh football player who idolises football superstar David Beckham and defies her traditional parents to pursue her dreams of playing football. The small-budget film was a critical and financial success in the United Kingdom, eventually making the leap around the world and to Canada and the United States where it earned over $30 million at the box office. The script was written by Chadha with her husband Paul Mayeda Berges and Guljit Bindra with Nagra in mind. While initially indifferent to the game of football, Nagra found the football-centred story to be both funny and touching. She agreed to audition and eventually accepted the role. An intensive ten-week training course in the game Futebol de Salao, coached by Simon Clifford, put Nagra through rigorous nine-hour-a-day workouts. Nagra learned to "bend" or curve the ball in flight, as she did in a scene in the film. Acknowledging Nagra's actual burn-scarred leg, Chadha wrote it into the film.

Nagra received critical and professional acclaim for her performance. She was nominated, and won, several awards, including the FIFA Presidential Award (2002), making her the first woman to have done so.

=== 2002–2019 ===
Not long after filming ended on Bend It Like Beckham, Nagra co-starred in the fantasy romantic comedy Ella Enchanted alongside Anne Hathaway where she played Areida, the best friend of Hathaway's's title character. In addition, she took on two notable television roles for Channel 4—as Viola/Cesario in a multicultural version of William Shakespeare's Twelfth Night, and as Heere Sharma in the two-part Anglo-Indian drama Second Generation, loosely based on Shakespeare's King Lear, directed by Jon Sen and starring Om Puri. Although Second Generation was a ratings flop, it was a critical success, earning a place in The Observer newspaper's top 10 British TV programmes of 2003. It garnered Nagra an Ethnic Multicultural Media Academy (EMMA) Award. For the role, Nagra had to gain the courage to do some of the love scenes that she had vowed not to do as an actress. Her visit to Calcutta to film the final scenes set there was Nagra's first visit to India.

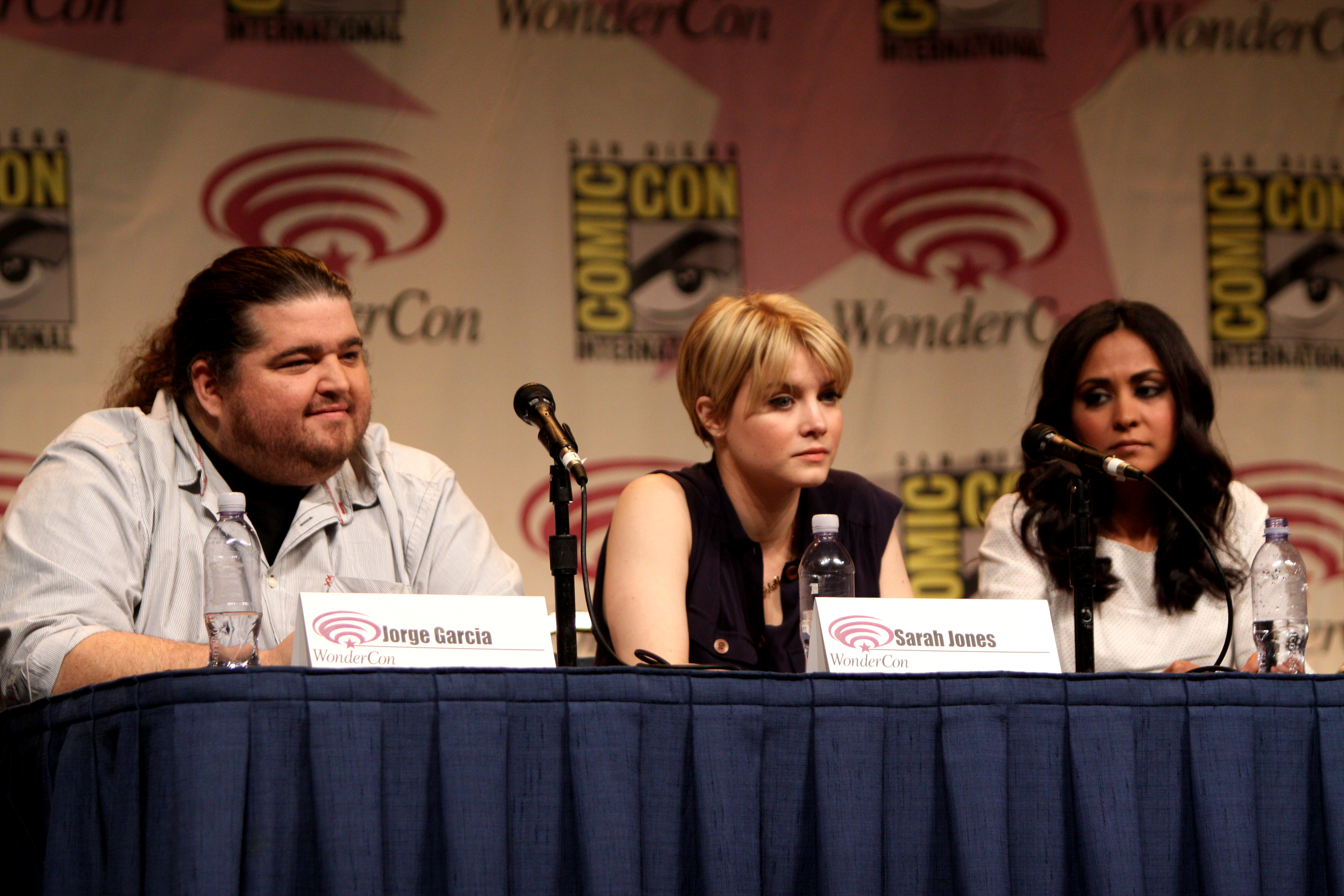
Nagra on a panel for the Fox science fiction drama series Alcatraz, along with fellow actors Jorge Garcia and Sarah Jones

While on a promotional junket in Los Angeles for Bend It Like Beckham, Nagra was informed by her agent that John Wells, one of the producers of the NBC medical drama series ER, was interested in meeting her. Bend It Like Beckham writer and director Gurinder Chadha revealed during a 2007 episode of BBC's Movie Connections that she arranged the meeting, because she had recommended Nagra for the role of the new Indian character in ER during a conversation with her friend Wells. Not long after the meeting, Nagra signed a one-year contract that included an option for three additional years. Despite her new status, Nagra said, "I don't think Hollywood has changed me at all. The first thing I did when I arrived was buy chapati flour and lentils."

Nagra made her first appearance on ER on 25 September 2003, in the tenth-season premiere titled "Now What?" as Neela Rasgotra, a new Yale-educated Anglo-Indian medical student at County General Hospital. Wells adapted the role to suit Nagra, so she could use her own English accent while working. Nagra appeared in twenty-one of the season's twenty-two episodes, including the twelfth episode titled "NICU" and the seventeenth episode titled "The Student", episodes in which her character played a central role. Noah Wyle, announcing his departure from the series in 2004, described Nagra as "the future" of ER, and the media concurred, anointing her as one of the show's "golden girls". In October 2008, following the departures of Goran Višnjić, Maura Tierney, and Mekhi Phifer, Nagra became the longest-serving cast member and lead actor of ER and remained so until just before the series concluded--she left the main cast in the penultimate episode.

When Nagra finished filming the eleventh season of ER in 2005, she returned to her native Leicester to star in Love in Little India directed by Amit Gupta. She was nominated in 2006 for an Asian Excellence Award, in the category of Outstanding Female Television Performance, for her work in ER, and won the award the following year. In 2008, Nagra voiced Cassandra in the DC animated film Batman: Gotham Knight.

She played Miss Lovely in the children's film Horrid Henry: The Movie (2011). She then starred as Dr Lucy Banerjee in the Fox science fiction drama series Alcatraz which ran for one season from 16 January to 26 March 2012.

Nagra starred as CIA agent Meera Malik in the first season of the NBC crime drama series The Blacklist from 2013 to 2014.

In 2016, Nagra joined the second series of the psychological thriller Fortitude. In 2018, she joined the second season of the Netflix television series 13 Reasons Why as Priya Singh, the new counsellor of Liberty High.

=== 2020s ===
Nagra starred as the titular character of the ITV series DI Ray. The first series of four episodes aired in 2022, with a second series of six episodes beginning filming in May 2023. and broadcast from 16 June 2024.

== Personal life ==
In 1996, while on the set of the play Fair Ladies at a Game of Poem Cards, Nagra met Irish actor Kieran Creggan, with whom she later moved into a flat in Kennington, South London. They were in a relationship for five years.

On 17 January 2009, after a seven-year relationship, Nagra married photographer James Stenson. Her ER co-stars Scott Grimes and John Stamos performed at the ceremony, and her friend and former ER co-star Maura Tierney officiated. The couple had a son together, but divorced in July 2013.

Nagra was one of the bearers of the Olympic torch as it passed through London on its way to the 2004 Summer Olympics in Athens, Greece.

== Filmography ==
=== Film ===
Film roles
Year	Title	Role	Notes
1991	Dushmani Jattan Di		
1999	Park Stories		Short film
2002	Bend It Like Beckham	Jasminder "Jess" Bhamra	
2004	Ella Enchanted	Areida	
2005	B13	Narrator	Voice
2008	In Your Dreams	Charlie	
2008	Batman: Gotham Knight	Cassandra	Voice
2010	Tere Ishq Nachaya	Harpreet, Kamal's Cousin	Billed as Parminder Kaur
2011	Horrid Henry: The Movie	Miss Lovely	
2012	Twenty8k	Deeva Jani	
2014	Postman Pat: The Movie	Nisha Bains	Voice
2018	Bird Box	Dr Lapham	
2019	Five Feet Apart	Noor Hamid	
2019	Piney: The Lonesome Pine	Bus Driver	Voice
2021	Awaken	Rakhi Singh	Short film
2023	The Kiss List	Asha	

=== Television ===
Television roles
Year	Title	Role	Notes
1996	King Girl	Ayshe	TV movie
1996, 1998	Casualty	Ayisha; Asha Guptah	Series 10; Episode 18: "Land of Hope"; Series 13; Episode 11: "Next of Kin"
1997	Turning World	Sabina	3 episodes
1998	Faxbir	Babu Frik	TV movie
1999	Small Potatoes	Nina	Episode: "Sexuality"
2000	Goodness Gracious Me	Various	2 episodes
2000	Donovan Quick	Radhika	TV movie
2000	Holby City	Tina	Episode: "The Trouble with the Truth"
2001	Judge John Deed	Ishbel McDonald	Episode: "Exacting Justice" (Pilot)
2002	Always and Everyone	Sunita Verma	8 episodes
2002	The Swap	Hotel Receptionist	TV film. Uncredited role
2003	Twelfth Night, or What You Will	Viola	TV film
2003	Second Generation	Heere/Sonali Sharma	TV movie
2003–2009	ER	Neela Rasgotra	Main cast (Seasons 10–15; 129 episodes)
2009	Compulsion	Anjika Indrani	TV film
2010	The Whole Truth	Pilar Shirazee	Episode: "Liars"
2012	Alcatraz	Dr. Lucille "Lucy" Banerjee	Main cast; 13 episodes
2012	Tron: Uprising	Ada	Episode: "Isolated", voice
2013	Psych	Rachael	4 episodes
2013	Reckless	Susan	TV film
2013–2014	The Blacklist	Meera Malik (Note: Despite similarities in name, Nagra's characters of Meera Malik on The Blacklist, and later Special Agent Mallick on Elementary, do not appear to be the same character.)	Main cast (Season 1; 21 episodes)
2015	NCIS: Los Angeles	Ella Deshai	Episode: "Expiration Date"
2015	Evil Men	Sarah Killas	TV film
2015	Kingmakers	Radha	TV film
2016–2017	Agents of S.H.I.E.L.D.	Ellen Nadeer	5 episodes
2017	Ben 10	Komal	Episode: "Drive You Crazy", voice
2017–2018	Fortitude	Dr. Surinder Khatri	Main cast (Series 2; 9 episodes), voice cameo (Series 3)
2018	Elementary	Special Agent Mallick	2 episodes
2018–2019	God Friended Me	Pria Amar	5 episodes
2018–2020	13 Reasons Why	Counselor Priya Singh	5 episodes
2020	Black-ish	Dr Wen	Episode: "Hero Pizza"
2021	Intergalactic	Arch-Marshall Rebecca Harper	Main cast; 8 episodes
2022–2024	DI Ray	Detective Inspector Rachita Ray	Title character (Seasons 1 & 2; 10 episodes)
2023	Maternal	Maryam Afridi	Main cast; 6 episodes

== Recognition and honours ==
The National Portrait Gallery in London holds a pencil drawing of Nagra by Stuart Pearson Wright created in 2004.

Nagra was awarded the honorary degree of doctors of letters by the University of Leicester on 11 July 2007.

She has also been nominated for or won a number of awards for her acting work, including:

Awards, nominated and won
Year	Organisation	Award/Category	Result	Work
2010	Audie Awards	Audiobook of the Year	Won	Nelson Mandela's Favorite African Folktales
2010	Audie Awards	Multi-Voiced Performance	Won	Nelson Mandela's Favorite African Folktales
2008	Asian Excellence Awards	Outstanding television actress	Nominated	ER
2007	Asian Excellence Awards	Outstanding television actress	Won	ER
2006	Morgan Stanley Great Britons Awards	Arts	Nominated	
2005	South Asian Students' Alliance	Recognition of Excellence Award; Outstanding Achievement in Acting (Female)	Won	ER
2004	Teen Choice Awards	Choice Breakout TV Star—Female	Nominated	ER
2004	Ethnic Multicultural Media Awards	Best Television Actress	Won	Second Generation (2003)
2004	Movieline Young Hollywood Awards	Breakthrough Performance by a Female	Won	Bend It Like Beckham (2002)
2004	Internet Movie Awards	Best Breakthrough Performance	Nominated	Bend It Like Beckham (2002)
2003	Empire Awards	Best Newcomer	Nominated	Bend It Like Beckham (2002)
2003	7th Annual Hollywood Film Festival Awards	Hollywood Actress of the Year	Nominated	Bend It Like Beckham (2002)
2003	Ethnic Multicultural Media Awards	Best Actress (Film)	Nominated	Bend It Like Beckham (2002)
2002	FIFA	FIFA Presidential Award	Won	Bend It Like Beckham (2002)
2002	Bordeaux International Festival of Women in Cinema	Golden Wave Award for Best Actress	Won	Bend It Like Beckham (2002); Tied with Keira Knightley
2002	British Independent Film Awards	Most Promising Newcomer	Nominated	Bend It Like Beckham (2002)
2002	European Film Awards	Audience Award Best Actress	Nominated	Bend It Like Beckham (2002)
2002	Carlton Multicultural Achievement Awards	Film	Nominated	Bend It Like Beckham (2002)
