= List of JAG episodes =

JAG (U.S. military acronym for Judge Advocate General) is an American legal drama television show with a distinct U.S. Navy and Marine Corps theme, created by Donald P. Bellisario, and produced by Belisarius Productions in association with Paramount Network Television (after 2006 known as CBS Studios). The first season was co-produced with NBC Productions.

Originally pitched towards the studio, network, and later also marketed for audiences as a Top Gun meets A Few Good Men hybrid series, the pilot episode of JAG first aired on NBC on September 23, 1995, but the series was later canceled on May 22, 1996, after finishing 79th in the ratings, leaving one episode unaired. Rival network CBS picked up the series for a mid-season replacement, beginning on January 3, 1997. For several seasons, JAG climbed in the ratings and was on the air for nine additional seasons. JAG furthermore spawned the hit series NCIS, which in turn spun off NCIS: Los Angeles, NCIS: New Orleans, and NCIS: Hawaiʻi.

In total, 227 episodes were produced over 10 seasons. At the time of the original airing of its fifth season in the United States, JAG was seen in over 90 countries worldwide. JAG entered syndication in early 1999.

== Series overview ==
Season	Episodes	Originally released		
Season	Episodes	First released	Last released	Network
1	22	September 23, 1995	July 8, 1996	NBC
2	15	January 3, 1997	April 18, 1997	CBS
3	24	September 23, 1997	May 19, 1998	CBS
4	24	September 22, 1998	May 25, 1999	CBS
5	25	September 21, 1999	May 23, 2000	CBS
6	24	October 3, 2000	May 22, 2001	CBS
7	24	September 25, 2001	May 21, 2002	CBS
8	24	September 24, 2002	May 20, 2003	CBS
9	23	September 26, 2003	May 21, 2004	CBS
10	22	September 24, 2004	April 29, 2005	CBS

== Episodes ==
=== Season 1 (1995–1996) ===
This season stars David James Elliott as Harmon Rabb, and Tracey Needham as Meg Austin. Patrick Labyorteaux and John M. Jackson both have continuous arcs throughout the season. Catherine Bell guest stars in one episode, Andrea Parker recurs.

No. overall	No. in season	Title	Directed by	Written by	Original release date	Prod. code	US viewers (millions)
1	1	"A New Life"	Donald P. Bellisario	Donald P. Bellisario	September 23, 1995	0101	16.0
2	2	"A New Life"	Donald P. Bellisario	Donald P. Bellisario	September 23, 1995	0102	16.0
3	3	"Shadow"	Donald P. Bellisario	Donald P. Bellisario	September 30, 1995	0103	11.0
4	4	"Desert Son"	Joe Napolitano	Story by : Robert Crais; Teleplay by : Robert Crais & Evan Katz & Donald P. Bellisario	October 7, 1995	0104	11.1
5	5	"Déjà Vu"	Doug Lefler	Evan Katz	October 21, 1995	0105	9.9
6	6	"Pilot Error"	Les Landau	Story by : Jack Orman; Teleplay by : Jack Orman & Robert Cochran & Donald P. Bellisario	November 4, 1995	0106	10.3
7	7	"War Cries"	Duwayne Dunham	R. Scott Gemmill	November 11, 1995	0107	10.8
8	8	"Brig Break"	Jim Johnston	Story by : Robert Cochran; Teleplay by : Reuben Leder & Robert Cochran	December 2, 1995	0108	10.4
9	9	"Scimitar"	John McPherson	Robert Cochran	December 9, 1995	0109	9.1
10	10	"Boot"	Jim Johnston	Lucian K. Truscott IV	January 6, 1996	0110	11.9
11	11	"Sightings"	Tom Del Ruth	Evan Katz	January 13, 1996	0111	10.1
12	12	"The Brotherhood"	Michael Zinberg	R. Scott Gemmill & Donald P. Bellisario	February 3, 1996	0112	10.4
13	13	"Defensive Action"	Ray Austin	Terry Curtis Fox	March 13, 1996	0113	12.1
14	14	"Smoked"	Jim Johnston	Donald P. Bellisario	March 20, 1996	0114	12.6
15	15	"Hemlock"	Jim Johnston	Story by : Robert Cochran & Jack Orman and Donald P. Bellisario; Teleplay by : Jack Orman & Donald P. Bellisario	March 27, 1996	0115	14.0
16	16	"High Ground"	Ray Austin	Robert L. McCullough & Greg Strangis	April 3, 1996	0116	12.3
17	17	"Black Ops"	Ray Austin	Story by : Greg Strangis & Peter Lance & Robert McCullough; Teleplay by : Greg Strangis & Robert L. McCullough	April 10, 1996	0117	12.9
18	18	"Survivors"	Greg Beeman	Story by : R. Scott Gemmill; Teleplay by : R. Scott Gemmill & Donald P. Bellisario & Jack Orman	April 17, 1996	0118	10.9
19	19	"Recovery"	Joe Napolitano	Jack Orman	May 1, 1996	0119	11.3
20	20	"The Prisoner"	Michael Zinberg	Evan Katz	May 8, 1996	0120	9.4
21	21	"Ares"	Ray Austin	Eric Hall & Jack Orman	May 22, 1996	0121	9.2
22	22	"Skeleton Crew"	Donald P. Bellisario	Donald P. Bellisario	July 8, 1996 (Seven Network); December 5, 1999 (USA Network)	0122	N/A

=== Season 2 (1997) ===
This season stars David James Elliott as Harmon Rabb. Catherine Bell joins the main cast as Sarah MacKenzie, alongside Patrick Labyorteaux as Bud Roberts, and John M. Jackson as A.J. Chegwidden. Steven Culp and Karri Turner have continuous arcs throughout the season. Chuck Carrington recurs.

No. overall	No. in season	Title	Directed by	Written by	Original release date	Prod. code	US viewers (millions)
23	1	"We the People"	Les Landau	Donald P. Bellisario	January 3, 1997	025	12.32
24	2	"Secrets"	Ray Austin	Tom Towler	January 10, 1997	028	12.64
25	3	"Jinx"	Jerry Jameson	Jack Orman	January 17, 1997	027	11.56
26	4	"Heroes"	Tony Wharmby	R. Scott Gemmill	January 24, 1997	026	13.13
27	5	"Crossing the Line"	Tony Wharmby	Stephen Zito	January 31, 1997	029	11.91
28	6	"Trinity"	Alan J. Levi	Jack Orman	February 7, 1997	024	11.71
29	7	"Ghosts"	Ray Austin	Story by : Brian Nelson and R. Scott Gemmill; Teleplay by : R. Scott Gemmill	February 14, 1997	030	11.14
30	8	"Full Engagement"	Alan J. Levi	Jack Orman	February 21, 1997	031	12.25
31	9	"Washington Holiday"	Joe Napolitano	Stephen Zito	February 28, 1997	032	12.62
32	10	"The Game of Go"	Ray Austin	Tom Towler	February 28, 1997	023	11.70
33	11	"Force Recon"	Alan J. Levi	Story by : Tom Towler and R. Scott Gemmill; Teleplay by : Tom Towler and Stephen Zito	March 7, 1997	033	11.05
34	12	"The Guardian"	Michael Schultz	Jack Orman	March 28, 1997	035	10.89
35	13	"Code Blue"	Tony Wharmby	R. Scott Gemmill	April 4, 1997	036	12.07
36	14	"Cowboys & Cossacks"	Tony Wharmby	R. Scott Gemmill	April 11, 1997	034	12.13
37	15	"Rendezvous"	Duwayne Dunham	Craig Tepper	April 18, 1997	037	10.63

=== Season 3 (1997–1998) ===
This season stars David James Elliott as Harmon Rabb, Catherine Bell as Sarah MacKenzie, Patrick Labyorteaux as Bud Roberts, and John M. Jackson as Admiral AJ Chegwidden. Steven Culp and Karri Turner have continuous arcs throughout the season. Tracey Needham guest stars in a flashback, Chuck Carrington recurs.

No. overall	No. in season	Title	Directed by	Written by	Original release date	Prod. code	US viewers (millions)
38	1	"Ghost Ship"	Donald P. Bellisario	Story by : Rear Admiral Paul T. Gillcrist and Donald P. Bellisario; Teleplay by : Donald P. Bellisario	September 23, 1997	039	12.42
39	2	"The Court-Martial of Sandra Gilbert"	Alan J. Levi	Stephen Zito	September 30, 1997	040	13.89
40	3	"The Good of the Service"	Alan J. Levi	Larry Moskowitz	October 7, 1997	038	12.66
41	4	"Blind Side"	Tony Wharmby	Dana Coen	October 14, 1997	041	12.00
42	5	"King of the Fleas"	Tony Wharmby	Dana Coen	October 21, 1997	043	12.48
43	6	"Vanished"	Alan J. Levi	R. Scott Gemmill	October 28, 1997	042	14.70
44	7	"Against All Enemies"	Joe Napolitano	Alex Davidson	November 4, 1997	044	12.27
45	8	"Above and Beyond"	Tony Wharmby	Paul Levine	November 11, 1997	045	13.85
46	9	"Impact"	Paul Schneider	R. Scott Gemmill	November 18, 1997	046	15.73
47	10	"People v. Rabb"	Greg Beeman	Larry Moskowitz	November 25, 1997	047	13.27
48	11	"Defenseless"	Tony Wharmby	Kimberly Costello	December 9, 1997	048	13.37
49	12	"Someone to Watch over Annie"	Greg Beeman	Stephen Zito	January 6, 1998	049	14.17
50	13	"With Intent to Die"	Winrich Kolbe	Larry Moskowitz	January 13, 1998	050	13.96
51	14	"Father's Day"	Tony Wharmby	Dana Coen	February 3, 1998	051	12.78
52	15	"Yesterday's Heroes"	Greg Beeman	R. Scott Gemmill	February 24, 1998	052	13.17
53	16	"Chains of Command"	Tony Wharmby	Stephen Zito	March 3, 1998	053	13.67
54	17	"The Stalker"	Scott Brazil	Larry Moskowitz	March 17, 1998	054	13.71
55	18	"Tiger, Tiger"	Tony Wharmby	Thom Parham	March 24, 1998	055	14.29
56	19	"Death Watch"	Donald P. Bellisario	Donald P. Bellisario	March 31, 1998	057	13.81
57	20	"The Imposter"	Alan J. Levi	R. Scott Gemmill	April 21, 1998	058	12.00
58	21	"The Return of Jimmy Blackhorse"	Alan J. Levi	Dana Coen	April 28, 1998	056	14.02
59	22	"Clipped Wings"	Tony Wharmby	Stephen Zito	May 5, 1998	059	12.59
60	23	"Wedding Bell Blues"	Alan J. Levi	Story by : Larry Moskowitz; Teleplay by : R. Scott Gemmill & Stephen Zito	May 12, 1998	060	13.37
61	24	"To Russia with Love"	Tony Wharmby	Larry Moskowitz & Donald P. Bellisario	May 19, 1998	061	12.13

=== Season 4 (1998–1999) ===
This season stars David James Elliott as Harmon Rabb, Catherine Bell as Sarah MacKenzie, Patrick Labyorteaux as Bud Roberts, and John M. Jackson as Admiral AJ Chegwidden. Steven Culp, Trevor Goddard and Karri Turner have continuous arcs throughout the season. Mae Whitman guest stars, Chuck Carrington recurs.

No. overall	No. in season	Title	Directed by	Written by	Original release date	Prod. code	US viewers (millions)
62	1	"Gypsy Eyes"	Tony Wharmby	Donald P. Bellisario	September 22, 1998	064	15.80
63	2	"Embassy"	Alan J. Levi	R. Scott Gemmill	September 29, 1998	063	14.41
64	3	"Innocence"	Tony Wharmby	Dana Coen	October 6, 1998	062	14.93
65	4	"Going After Francesca"	Alan J. Levi	Stephen Zito	October 13, 1998	065	14.71
66	5	"The Martin Baker Fan Club"	Tony Wharmby	Dana Coen	October 20, 1998	066	14.21
67	6	"Act of Terror"	Alan J. Levi	Larry Moskowitz	October 27, 1998	067	15.52
68	7	"Angels 30"	Tony Wharmby	R. Scott Gemmill	November 3, 1998	068	15.14
69	8	"Mr. Rabb Goes to Washington"	Jeannot Szwarc	Stephen Zito	November 10, 1998	069	17.11
70	9	"People v. Mac"	Tony Wharmby	Larry Moskowitz	November 17, 1998	070	16.18
71	10	"The Black Jet"	Jeannot Szwarc	David Zabel	November 24, 1998	071	16.06
72	11	"Jaggle Bells"	Greg Beeman	R. Scott Gemmill	December 15, 1998	072	16.44
73	12	"Dungaree Justice"	Hugo Cortina	David Zabel	January 12, 1999	073	16.68
74	13	"War Stories"	Greg Beeman	Dana Coen	January 13, 1999	074	15.56
75	14	"Webb of Lies"	Mark Horowitz	R. Scott Gemmill	February 9, 1999	075	15.43
76	15	"Rivers' Run"	Greg Beeman	Larry Moskowitz	February 16, 1999	076	17.22
77	16	"Silent Service"	Alan J. Levi	Dana Coen	February 23, 1999	077	16.37
78	17	"Nobody's Child"	Tony Wharmby	Stephen Zito	March 2, 1999	078	15.80
79	18	"Shakedown"	Alan J. Levi	R. Scott Gemmill	March 30, 1999	079	15.31
80	19	"The Adversaries"	Tony Wharmby	Story by : Dana Coen and Larry Moskowitz; Teleplay by : Larry Moskowitz	April 13, 1999	080	13.22
81	20	"Second Sight"	Terrence O'Hara	Dana Coen	April 27, 1999	081	14.42
82	21	"Wilderness of Mirrors"	Alan J. Levi	Paul Levine	May 4, 1999	082	14.06
83	22	"Soul Searching"	Jeannot Szwarc	Donald P. Bellisario	May 11, 1999	083	13.10
84	23	"Yeah, Baby"	Alan J. Levi	R. Scott Gemmill	May 18, 1999	084	14.21
85	24	"Goodbyes"	Jeannot Szwarc	Stephen Zito	May 25, 1999	085	12.92

=== Season 5 (1999–2000) ===
This season stars David James Elliott as Harmon Rabb, Catherine Bell as Sarah MacKenzie, Patrick Labyorteaux as Bud Roberts, and John M. Jackson as Admiral AJ Chegwidden. Steven Culp, Trevor Goddard, Randy Vasquez and Karri Turner have continuous arcs throughout the season. Mae Whitman guest stars, Chuck Carrington recurs.

No. overall	No. in season	Title	Directed by	Written by	Original release date	Prod. code	US viewers (millions)
86	1	"King of the Greenie Board"	Alan J. Levi	John Schulian	September 21, 1999	086	15.81
87	2	"Rules of Engagement"	Jeannot Szwarc	Ed Zuckerman	September 28, 1999	087	17.00
88	3	"True Callings"	Alan J. Levi	Story by : Ed Zuckerman & John Schulian & Rear Admiral Paul T. Gillcrist; Teleplay by : Ed Zuckerman & John Schulian	October 5, 1999	088	15.57
89	4	"The Return"	Greg Beeman	Larry Moskowitz	October 12, 1999	089	16.33
90	5	"Front and Center"	Alan Myerson	Dana Coen	October 19, 1999	090	16.19
91	6	"Psychic Warrior"	Greg Beeman	Paul Levine	November 2, 1999	091	17.18
92	7	"Rogue"	Tony Wharmby	Larry Moskowitz	November 9, 1999	092	16.79
93	8	"The Colonel's Wife"	Alan J. Levi	John Schulian	November 16, 1999	093	16.95
94	9	"Contemptuous Words"	Jeannot Szwarc	Ed Zuckerman	November 23, 1999	094	14.57
95	10	"Mishap"	Terrence O'Hara	Larry Moskowitz	November 30, 1999	095	18.32
96	11	"Ghosts of Christmas Past"	Alan J. Levi	Story by : Donald P. Bellisario; Teleplay by : Ed Zuckerman & John Schulian	December 14, 1999	096	16.01
97	12	"Into the Breech"	Mark Horowitz	Paul Levine	January 11, 2000	097	13.85
98	13	"Life or Death"	Tony Wharmby	Catherine Stribling	January 18, 2000	098	14.19
99	14	"Cabin Pressure"	Jeannot Szwarc	Dana Coen	February 1, 2000	099	14.45
100	15	"Boomerang"	Donald P. Bellisario & Jeannot Szwarc	Donald P. Bellisario	February 8, 2000	100	15.23
101	16	"Boomerang"	Donald P. Bellisario & Jeannot Szwarc	Donald P. Bellisario	February 15, 2000	101	16.59
102	17	"People v. Gunny"	Terrence O'Hara	Larry Moskowitz	February 22, 2000	102	15.80
103	18	"The Bridge at Kang So Ri"	Ian Toynton	Ed Zuckerman & Paul Levine	February 29, 2000	103	15.19
104	19	"Promises"	Arthur W. Forney	John Schulian	March 28, 2000	104	15.17
105	20	"Drop Zone"	Hugo Cortina	Larry Moskowitz	April 4, 2000	105	14.38
106	21	"The Witches of Gulfport"	Tony Wharmby	Dana Coen	April 25, 2000	106	12.67
107	22	"Overdue & Presumed Lost"	Tony Wharmby	John Schulian & Paul Levine	May 2, 2000	107	12.50
108	23	"Real Deal Seal"	Terrence O'Hara	Paul Levine	May 9, 2000	108	12.95
109	24	"Body Talk"	Terrence O'Hara	Dana Coen	May 16, 2000	109	13.21
110	25	"Surface Warfare"	Jeannot Szwarc	Ed Zuckerman	May 23, 2000	110	13.24

=== Season 6 (2000–2001) ===
This season stars David James Elliott as Harmon Rabb, Catherine Bell as Sarah MacKenzie, Patrick Labyorteaux as Bud Roberts, and John M. Jackson as Admiral AJ Chegwidden. Steven Culp, Trevor Goddard, Randy Vasquez and Karri Turner have continuous arcs throughout the season. Mae Whitman and Andrea Parker guest stars in one episode, Chuck Carrington recurs.

No. overall	No. in season	Title	Directed by	Written by	Original release date	Prod. code	US viewers (millions)
111	1	"Legacy"	Terrence O'Hara	Ed Zuckerman & Paul Levine	October 3, 2000	111	13.46
112	2	"Legacy"	Terrence O'Hara	Ed Zuckerman & Paul Levine	October 10, 2000	112	14.07
113	3	"Florida Straits"	Alan J. Levi	Dana Coen	October 17, 2000	113	13.64
114	4	"Flight Risk"	Bradford May	Jonathan Robert Kaplan	October 24, 2000	114	12.37
115	5	"JAG TV"	Scott Brazil	Patrick Labyorteaux	October 31, 2000	115	13.82
116	6	"The Princess and the Petty Officer"	Alan J. Levi	Mark Saraceni	November 14, 2000	118	13.04
117	7	"A Separate Peace"	Jeannot Szwarc	Stephen Zito	November 21, 2000	116	12.90
118	8	"A Separate Peace"	Terrence O'Hara	Stephen Zito	November 28, 2000	117	13.47
119	9	"Family Secrets"	Bradford May	Paul Levine	December 12, 2000	119	13.53
120	10	"Touch and Go"	James Whitmore Jr.	Dana Coen	January 9, 2001	120	15.26
121	11	"Baby, It's Cold Outside"	Hugo Cortina	Stephen Zito	January 16, 2001	121	15.24
122	12	"Collision Course"	Greg Beeman	Jonathan Robert Kaplan	January 30, 2001	123	16.29
123	13	"Miracles"	Mark Horowitz	Ed Zuckerman	February 6, 2001	122	15.39
124	14	"Killer Instinct"	Jerry London	Mark Saraceni	February 13, 2001	124	15.16
125	15	"Iron Coffin"	Scott Brazil	Paul Levine	February 20, 2001	125	15.63
126	16	"Retreat, Hell"	Jeannot Szwarc	Stephen Zito	February 27, 2001	126	15.94
127	17	"Valor"	Terrence O'Hara	Douglas Stark	March 13, 2001	127	13.39
128	18	"Liberty"	Jeannot Szwarc	Larry Moskowitz	March 27, 2001	128	14.08
129	19	"Salvation"	Bradford May	Ed Zuckerman	April 10, 2001	129	11.99
130	20	"To Walk on Wings"	Michael Schultz	Story by : Paul Levine and Jonathan Robert Kaplan; Teleplay by : Paul Levine	April 24, 2001	130	12.08
131	21	"Past Tense"	Bradford May	Dana Coen	May 1, 2001	132	11.26
132	22	"Lifeline"	David James Elliott	Larry Moskowitz	May 8, 2001	131	12.33
133	23	"Mutiny"	Mark Horowitz	Ed Zuckerman & Nelson Costello	May 15, 2001	133	11.31
134	24	"Adrift, Part I"	Scott Brazil	Stephen Zito & Dana Coen	May 22, 2001	134	15.14

=== Season 7 (2001–2002) ===
This season stars David James Elliott as Harmon Rabb, Catherine Bell as Sarah MacKenzie, Patrick Labyorteaux as Bud Roberts, and John M. Jackson as Admiral AJ Chegwidden. Steven Culp, Trevor Goddard, Zoe McLellan, Scott Lawrence, Nanci Chambers, Randy Vasquez and Karri Turner have continuous arcs throughout the season. Chuck Carrington recurs.

No. overall	No. in season	Title	Directed by	Written by	Original release date	Prod. code	US viewers (millions)
135	1	"Adrift, Part II"	Bradford May	Dana Coen & Stephen Zito	September 25, 2001	135	17.81
136	2	"New Gun in Town"	Terrence O'Hara	Stephen Zito	October 2, 2001	136	15.92
137	3	"Measure of Men"	Bradford May	Dana Coen	October 9, 2001	137	17.04
138	4	"Guilt"	Greg Beeman	David Ehrman	October 16, 2001	138	17.27
139	5	"Mixed Messages"	Scott Brazil	Nan Hagan	October 23, 2001	139	17.88
140	6	"Redemption"	James Whitmore Jr.	David Ehrman	October 30, 2001	142	14.90
141	7	"Ambush"	Bradford May	Don McGill	November 6, 2001	140	16.67
142	8	"Jagathon"	Scott Brazil	Story by : Dana Coen and J. Jetsyn Tache; Teleplay by : Dana Coen	November 13, 2001	141	17.11
143	9	"Dog Robber"	Terrence O'Hara	Stephen Zito	November 20, 2001	143	15.50
144	10	"Dog Robber"	Jerry London	Stephen Zito	November 27, 2001	144	15.99
145	11	"Answered Prayers"	Terrence O'Hara	Story by : Nan Hagen and Paul Levine; Teleplay by : Paul Levine	December 11, 2001	145	16.41
146	12	"Capital Crime"	Richard Compton	Don McGill	January 8, 2002	146	16.68
147	13	"Code of Conduct"	Dennis Smith	Dana Coen	January 15, 2002	147	18.12
148	14	"Odd Man Out"	Michael Switzer	David Ehrman	January 22, 2002	148	16.26
149	15	"Head to Toe"	Terrence O'Hara	Dana Coen & Don McGill	February 5, 2002	149	16.42
150	16	"The Mission"	Rod Hardy	Stephen Zito	February 26, 2002	150	17.12
151	17	"Exculpatory Evidence"	Harvey S. Laidman	Eric A. Morris	March 5, 2002	151	15.46
152	18	"Hero Worship"	Rod Hardy	Story by : Dana Coen; Teleplay by : Don McGill & Dana Coen	March 12, 2002	152	16.36
153	19	"First Casualty"	Oz Scott	Paul Levine	March 26, 2002	153	15.85
154	20	"Port Chicago"	Jeannot Szwarc	Don McGill	April 9, 2002	154	14.82
155	21	"Tribunal"	Mark Horowitz	Charles Holland	April 30, 2002	155	13.60
156	22	"Defending His Honor"	Jeannot Szwarc	Lynnie Greene & Richard Levine	May 7, 2002	156	13.21
157	23	"In Country"	Hugo Cortina	Dana Coen	May 14, 2002	157	12.84
158	24	"Enemy Below"	Bradford May	Story by : Donald P. Bellisario; Teleplay by : Charles Holland	May 21, 2002	158	14.15

=== Season 8 (2002–2003) ===
This season stars David James Elliott as Harmon Rabb, Catherine Bell as Sarah MacKenzie, Patrick Labyorteaux as Bud Roberts, and John M. Jackson as Admiral AJ Chegwidden. Steven Culp, Zoe McLellan, Scott Lawrence, Nanci Chambers, Randy Vasquez and Karri Turner have continuous arcs throughout the season. Tamlyn Tomita guest stars, Chuck Carrington recurs.

No. overall	No. in season	Title	Directed by	Written by	Original release date	Prod. code	US viewers (millions)
159	1	"Critical Condition"	Jeannot Szwarc	Story by : Donald P. Bellisario and Charles Holland; Teleplay by : Charles Holland	September 24, 2002	159	16.13
160	2	"The Promised Land"	Scott Brazil	Dana Coen	October 1, 2002	160	14.81
161	3	"Family Business"	Bradford May	Steven Smith	October 8, 2002	161	14.82
162	4	"Dangerous Game"	Terrence O'Hara	John Chambers	October 15, 2002	162	15.03
163	5	"In Thin Air"	Harvey S. Laidman	Don McGill	October 22, 2002	163	14.56
164	6	"Offensive Action"	Dennis Smith	Lynnie Greene & Richard Levine	October 29, 2002	164	15.66
165	7	"Need to Know"	Bradford May	Philip DeGuere, Jr.	November 5, 2002	165	14.69
166	8	"Ready or Not"	Philip Sgriccia	Don McGill	November 12, 2002	166	14.89
167	9	"When the Bough Breaks"	Richard Compton	Darcy Meyers	November 19, 2002	167	15.75
168	10	"The Killer"	Michael Schultz	Charles Holland	November 26, 2002	168	15.15
169	11	"All Ye Faithful"	Kenneth Johnson	Dana Coen	December 17, 2002	169	13.62
170	12	"Complications"	Bradford May	Paul Levine	January 7, 2003	170	16.05
171	13	"Standards of Conduct"	Rod Hardy	Philip DeGuere, Jr.	January 21, 2003	171	14.30
172	14	"Each of Us Angels"	Bradford May	Darcy Meyers	February 4, 2003	172	14.10
173	15	"Friendly Fire"	Kenneth Johnson	Paul Levine	February 11, 2003	173	13.54
174	16	"Heart and Soul"	Bradford May	Dana Coen	February 18, 2003	174	15.36
175	17	"Empty Quiver"	Kenneth Johnson	Philip DeGuere, Jr.	February 25, 2003	175	15.80
176	18	"Fortunate Son"	Terrence O'Hara	Darcy Meyers	March 18, 2003	176	14.03
177	19	"Second Acts"	Kenneth Johnson	Story by : Don McGill; Teleplay by : Philip DeGuere, Jr.	April 1, 2003	177	11.85
178	20	"Ice Queen"	Donald P. Bellisario	Donald P. Bellisario & Don McGill	April 22, 2003	178	13.84
179	21	"Meltdown"	Scott Brazil	Donald P. Bellisario & Don McGill	April 29, 2003	179	13.63
180	22	"Lawyers, Guns, and Money"	Bradford May	Dana Coen & Stephen Zito	May 6, 2003	180	12.75
181	23	"Pas de Deux"	Bradford May	Dana Coen & Stephen Zito	May 13, 2003	181	12.64
182	24	"A Tangled Webb, Part I"	Bradford May	Stephen Zito	May 20, 2003	182	13.27

=== Season 9 (2003–2004) ===
This season stars David James Elliott as Harmon Rabb, Catherine Bell as Sarah MacKenzie, Patrick Labyorteaux as Bud Roberts, and John M. Jackson as Admiral AJ Chegwidden. Steven Culp, Zoe McLellan, Scott Lawrence, Randy Vasquez and Karri Turner have continuous arcs throughout the season. Chuck Carrington guest stars.

No. overall	No. in season	Title	Directed by	Written by	Original release date	Prod. code	US viewers (millions)
183	1	"A Tangled Webb, Part II"	Bradford May	Stephen Zito	September 26, 2003	183	13.76
184	2	"Shifting Sands"	Jeannot Szwarc	Dana Coen	October 3, 2003	184	13.42
185	3	"Secret Agent Man"	Bradford May	Darcy Meyers	October 10, 2003	185	11.60
186	4	"The One That Got Away"	Kenneth Johnson	Thomas L. Moran	October 17, 2003	186	12.30
187	5	"Touchdown"	Dennis Smith	Matt Witten	October 24, 2003	187	12.47
188	6	"Back in the Saddle"	Kenneth Johnson	Stephen Zito	October 31, 2003	188	12.19
189	7	"Close Quarters"	Bradford May	Dana Coen	November 7, 2003	189	13.05
190	8	"Posse Comitatus"	Stephen Cragg	Paul Levine	November 14, 2003	190	13.60
191	9	"The Boast"	Bradford May	Matt Witten	November 21, 2003	191	13.26
192	10	"Pulse Rate"	LeVar Burton	Darcy Meyers	December 2, 2003	192	13.00
193	11	"A Merry Little Christmas"	Bradford May	Stephen Zito	December 12, 2003	193	12.56
194	12	"A Girl's Best Friend"	James Keach	Darcy Meyers	January 9, 2004	194	12.32
195	13	"Good Intentions"	Michael Fresco	Thomas L. Moran	January 16, 2004	195	12.05
196	14	"People v. SecNav"	Dennis Smith	Larry Moskowitz	February 6, 2004	196	12.46
197	15	"Crash"	Bradford May	Matt Witten	February 13, 2004	197	11.37
198	16	"Persian Gulf"	Kenneth Johnson	Philip DeGuere, Jr.	February 20, 2004	198	11.84
199	17	"Take It Like a Man"	David James Elliott	Darcy Meyers	February 27, 2004	199	11.81
200	18	"What If?"	Kenneth Johnson	Stephen Zito & Don McGill	March 12, 2004	200	10.45
201	19	"Hard Time"	Bradford May	Dana Coen	April 2, 2004	201	11.02
202	20	"Fighting Words"	Jeannot Szwarc	Matt Witten	April 30, 2004	203	9.63
203	21	"Coming Home"	Bradford May	Stephen Zito	May 7, 2004	202	10.16
204	22	"Trojan Horse"	Peter Ellis	Darcy Meyers	May 14, 2004	204	9.25
205	23	"Hail and Farewell, Part I"	Dennis Smith	Dana Coen	May 21, 2004	205	11.54

=== Season 10 (2004–2005) ===
This season stars David James Elliott as Harmon Rabb, Catherine Bell as Sarah MacKenzie, and Patrick Labyorteaux as Bud Roberts. Scott Lawrence joins the main cast as Sturgis Turner, alongside Zoe McLellan as Jennifer Coates. Steven Culp, David Andrews and Karri Turner have continuous arcs throughout the season. Jordana Spiro, Meta Golding and Chris Beetem also star.

No. overall	No. in season	Title	Directed by	Written by	Original release date	Prod. code	US viewers (millions)
206	1	"Hail and Farewell, Part II"	Terrence O'Hara	Stephen Zito	September 24, 2004	207	9.95
207	2	"Corporate Raiders"	Bradford May	Don McGill	October 1, 2004	208	9.28
208	3	"Retrial"	Jeannot Szwarc	Larry Moskowitz	October 15, 2004	210	10.36
209	4	"Whole New Ball Game"	Terrence O'Hara	Darcy Meyers	October 29, 2004	209	9.37
210	5	"This Just In from Baghdad"	Bradford May	Philip DeGuere, Jr.	November 5, 2004	211	9.63
211	6	"One Big Boat"	Kenneth Johnson	Dana Coen	November 12, 2004	212	10.41
212	7	"Camp Delta"	Oz Scott	Larry Moskowitz	November 19, 2004	214	9.85
213	8	"There Goes the Neighborhood"	David James Elliott	Darcy Meyers	November 26, 2004	213	10.21
214	9	"The Man on the Bridge"	Vern Gillum	Don McGill	December 10, 2004	215	10.67
215	10	"The Four Percent Solution"	Dennis Smith	Dana Coen	December 17, 2004	206	9.03
216	11	"Automatic for the People"	Kenneth Johnson	Story by : Philip DeGuere, Jr. & Darcy Meyers; Teleplay by : Philip DeGuere, Jr.	January 7, 2005	216	10.58
217	12	"The Sixth Juror"	Bradford May	Paul Levine	January 14, 2005	219	9.95
218	13	"Heart of Darkness"	Bradford May	Paul Levine	February 4, 2005	217	10.10
219	14	"Fit for Duty"	Randy D. Wiles	Don McGill & Darcy Meyers	February 11, 2005	218	9.25
220	15	"Bridging the Gulf"	Dennis Smith	Larry Moskowitz	February 18, 2005	220	9.51
221	16	"Straits of Malacca"	Richard Compton	Darcy Meyers	February 25, 2005	221	10.30
222	17	"JAG: San Diego"	Vern Gillum	Story by : Larry Moskowitz; Teleplay by : Don McGill & Larry Moskowitz	March 11, 2005	222	8.98
223	18	"Death at the Mosque"	Bradford May	Stephen Zito	April 1, 2005	223	9.01
224	19	"Two Towns"	Kenneth Johnson	Dana Coen	April 8, 2005	224	9.02
225	20	"Unknown Soldier"	Mike Vejar	Story by : Joseph C. Wilson; Teleplay by : Aurorae Khoo & Stephen Lyons	April 15, 2005	225	9.25
226	21	"Dream Team"	Vern Gillum	Larry Moskowitz & Don McGill	April 22, 2005	226	10.24
227	22	"Fair Winds and Following Seas"	Bradford May	Stephen Zito	April 29, 2005	227	13.98

== U.S. television ratings ==
Seasonal rankings (based on average total viewers per episode) of JAG from Nielsen ratings on NBC (first season) and CBS (other seasons).

Note: U.S. network television seasons generally start in late September and end in late May, which coincides with the completion of the May sweeps.

Season	Time slot	Season premiere	Season finale	TV season	Rank	Viewers (in millions)
1	Saturday at 8:00 pm (EST) (September 23, 1995 – February 3, 1996); Wednesday at 8:00 pm (EST) (March 13 – May 22, 1996)	September 23, 1995	May 22, 1996	1995–1996	79	11.56
2	Friday at 9:00 pm (EST) (January 3 – March 7, 1997); Friday at 8:00 pm (EST) (March 28 – April 18, 1997)	January 3, 1997	April 18, 1997	1996–1997	68	11.80
3	Tuesday at 8:00 pm (EST)	September 23, 1997	May 19, 1998	1997–1998	36	12.90
4	Tuesday at 8:00 pm (EST)	September 22, 1998	May 25, 1999	1998–1999	17	14.20
5	Tuesday at 8:00 pm (EST)	September 21, 1999	May 23, 2000	1999–2000	25	14.07
6	Tuesday at 8:00 pm (EST)	October 3, 2000	May 22, 2001	2000–2001	26	14.60
7	Tuesday at 8:00 pm (EST)	September 25, 2001	May 21, 2002	2001–2002	15	14.80
8	Tuesday at 8:00 pm (EST)	September 24, 2002	May 20, 2003	2002–2003	26	12.97
9	Friday at 9:00 pm (EST)	September 26, 2003	May 21, 2004	2003–2004	37	10.80
10	Friday at 9:00 pm (EST)	September 24, 2004	April 29, 2005	2004–2005	50	9.66

JAG had generally an older skewing audience: for the 2002–2003 season, the median age viewer was 58 (the same figure was also held by other CBS shows Becker and The Guardian). As a comparison, for the same season, Law & Order and Law & Order: Special Victims Unit on NBC had a median of 50, while The Practice and NYPD Blue on ABC had a median of 48. However, as the article in Broadcasting & Cable states: "fewer broadcast network primetime series than [2013] had median age audiences over 50"

== Home media ==
JAG was not available on DVD (or VHS, with the singular exception of the pilot movie, which was given a VHS release by Paramount Home Video in 1998 ) during the course of its original run. It was suggested that a syndication deal with USA Network possibly prevented Paramount from issuing DVD releases. Before it did happen in 2006, JAG was the second most requested TV series not commercially available on the TVShowsOnDVD.com website.

Season	Episodes	DVD release dates			
Season	Episodes	Region 1	Region 2	Region 4	Discs
1	22	July 25, 2006	October 16, 2006	September 30, 2009	6
2	15	November 7, 2006	September 10, 2007	August 16, 2007	4
3	24	March 20, 2007	February 9, 2009	June 5, 2008	6
4	24	August 21, 2007	February 9, 2009	October 2, 2008	6
5	25	January 29, 2008	May 18, 2009	May 7, 2009	7
6	24	May 20, 2008	September 14, 2009	September 3, 2009	6
7	24	November 4, 2008	March 22, 2010	March 4, 2010	5
8	24	March 17, 2009	June 21, 2010	August 5, 2010	5
9	23	November 3, 2009	September 20, 2010	November 4, 2010	5
10	22	February 9, 2010	June 27, 2011	July 7, 2011	5
Total	227	April 14, 2015	June 27, 2011	December 1, 2011	55

== See also ==
- NCIS (franchise)
