= JAG season 3 =

JAG
- Season 3
- Starring: David James Elliott; Catherine Bell; Patrick Labyorteaux; John M. Jackson; Karri Turner
- No. of episodes: 24

Release
- Original network: CBS
- Original release: September 23, 1997 – May 19, 1998

Season chronology
- ← Previous; Season 2 Next → Season 4

The third season of JAG premiered on CBS on September 23, 1997, and concluded on May 19, 1998. The season, starring David James Elliott and Catherine Bell, was produced by Belisarius Productions in association with Paramount Television.

== Plot ==
Following in his father's footsteps as a Naval Aviator, Lieutenant Commander Harmon Rabb, Jr. suffered a crash while landing his Tomcat on a storm-tossed carrier at sea. Diagnosed with night-blindness, Harm transferred to the Navy's Judge Advocate General Corps, which investigates, defends, and prosecutes the law of the sea. (Note: Actually, the law that JAG does prosecute and defend criminal cases under is named the Uniform Code of Military Justice (UCMJ) and its various articles are frequently referenced to in the episodes. The law of the sea, on the other hand, is actually a United Nations convention, which the United States has decided not to ratify due to sovereignty issues.) There, with fellow JAG lawyer Major Sarah MacKenzie, he now fights in and out of the courtroom, with the same daring and tenacity that made him a top gun in the air. - 2nd and 3rd season opening narration, read by Don LaFontaine

Lieutenant Commander Harmon "Harm" Rabb, Jr. (David James Elliott), a former aviator, and Marine Major Sarah "Mac" MacKenzie (Catherine Bell) work for the Headquarters of the Judge Advocate General, the internal law firm of the Department of the Navy. Mac, a beautiful, by-the-book Marine, is JAG's Chief of Staff and Harm's partner. She oversees a team including Lieutenant J.G. Bud Roberts (Patrick Labyorteaux), Ensign Harriet Sims (Karri Turner), and Commander Carolyn Imes (Dana Sparks), as they investigate cases including the discovery of a skeleton aboard a decommissioned ship ("Ghost Ship"), a fraternization charge ("The Court-Martial of Sandra Gilbert"), a training accident ("Blindside"), and a murder in Vietnam ("Vanished"). Meanwhile, Mac comes face-to-face with her past ("The Good of the Service"), and departs JAG for private-practice ("Impact"), Bud tries his hand at Karaoke ("Above and Beyond"), Harm is accused of murder ("People v. Rabb"), Harm and Mac travel to Russia ("To Russia With Love"), Rear Admiral A.J. Chegwidden (John M. Jackson) loses his mentor ("With Intent to Die"), and Mac learns of Lieutenant Diane Schonke ("Death Watch"), her doppelganger whose murder was investigated by Harm and Lieutenant Meg Austin (Tracey Needham) in 1996.

== Production ==
Despite an initial reluctance to co-operate from the United States Department of the Navy (due to sensitivity in light of all the accumulative negative publicity that had been generated from the Tailhook scandal and its aftermath), during season three, the naval services had begun to change their minds, and began to render support to the production team on a script-by-script basis. Commander Bob Anderson of the Navy's entertainment media liaison office in Los Angeles stated that "we're fine with that as long as the bad guys are caught and punished, and the institution of the Navy is not the bad guy".

== Cast and characters ==
=== Main ===
- David James Elliott as Harmon Rabb, Jr., Lieutenant Commander
- Catherine Bell as Sarah MacKenzie, Major in the Marine Corps.
- Patrick Labyorteaux as Bud Roberts, Lieutenant J.G.
- John M. Jackson as A. J. Chegwidden, Rear Admiral

=== Also starring ===
- Karri Turner as Harriet Sims, Ensign

=== Recurring ===
- Paul Collins as Alexander Nelson, Secretary of the Navy
- Steven Culp as Clayton Webb, CIA Officer
- Chuck Carrington as Jason Tiner, Petty Officer
- Harrison Page as Stiles Morris, Captain
- Michael Bellisario as Michael Roberts
- Anne-Marie Johnson as Roberta Latham, Congresswoman
- Dana Sparks as Carolyn Imes, Commander
- Rex Linn as Sokol, FSB Agent

=== Guest appearances ===
- Tracey Needham as Meg Austin, Lieutenant J.G.

== Episodes ==
| No. overall | No. in season | Title | Directed by | Written by | Original release date | Prod. code | US viewers (millions) |
|---|---|---|---|---|---|---|---|
| 38 | 1 | "Ghost Ship" | Donald P. Bellisario | Story by : Rear Admiral Paul T. Gillcrist and Donald P. Bellisario; Teleplay by : Donald P. Bellisario | September 23, 1997 | 039 | 12.42 |
After a skeleton is discovered in the hull of the decommissioned aircraft carrier USS Hornet, Harm becomes obsessed with discovering a link between the body and his missing father.
| 39 | 2 | "The Court-Martial of Sandra Gilbert" | Alan J. Levi | Stephen Zito | September 30, 1997 | 040 | 13.89 |
The trial of a Marine AH-1 Cobra pilot (Elizabeth Mitchell) accused of fraternization with a non-commissioned officer is complicated when an activist female Congresswoman Roberta "Bobbi" Latham (Anne-Marie Johnson) interferes in the name of "fairness".
| 40 | 3 | "The Good of the Service" | Alan J. Levi | Larry Moskowitz | October 7, 1997 | 038 | 12.66 |
Harm and Mac must face the Admiral in court when he defends a Marine colonel who disobeyed orders in rescuing his team from a Haitian warlord. Mac is doubly concerned because she and the Colonel used to be lovers.
| 41 | 4 | "Blind Side" | Tony Wharmby | Dana Coen | October 14, 1997 | 041 | 12.00 |
When a training accident kills two civilians, Harm may have to end the career of his mentor to save the pilot from taking the fall. Guest-starring Sarah Silverman as Lt. Schipperelli.
| 42 | 5 | "King of the Fleas" | Tony Wharmby | Dana Coen | October 21, 1997 | 043 | 12.48 |
A paraplegic Vietnam vet comes to JAG HQ and confesses to a murder, but the situation is complicated by the possibility that the man knows something about what happened to Harm's father.
| 43 | 6 | "Vanished" | Alan J. Levi | R. Scott Gemmill | October 28, 1997 | 042 | 14.70 |
When a fully armed F-14 disappears without a trace, Harm and Mac must determine what happened to the plane and its pilot.
| 44 | 7 | "Against All Enemies" | Joe Napolitano | Alex Davidson | November 4, 1997 | 044 | 12.27 |
When the U.S. is accused of shooting down a North Korean civilian plane, Harm, Mac and Bud must work to find the truth before the North Koreans sink a U.S. salvage vessel in retaliation.
| 45 | 8 | "Above and Beyond" | Tony Wharmby | Paul Levine | November 11, 1997 | 045 | 13.85 |
Lieutenant Curtis Rivers (Montel Williams), a Navy SEAL up for the Medal of Honor for rescuing a Washington diplomat from Hezbollah, may not get the award when evidence shows that he may have left one of his men behind on the mission. Rivers refuses to clarify the matter one way or the other. Bud gets drunk and sings the Tom Jones song, Delilah. (Note: The episode incorporated news archive footage of then-President Bill Clinton at an award ceremony.)
| 46 | 9 | "Impact" | Paul Schneider | R. Scott Gemmill | November 18, 1997 | 046 | 15.73 |
Harm and Bud encounter resistance when investigating the mid-air collision between a Marine helicopter and an "unknown" aircraft. Meanwhile, Mac leaves JAG for civilian practice at her boyfriend's law firm.
| 47 | 10 | "People v. Rabb" | Greg Beeman | Larry Moskowitz | November 25, 1997 | 047 | 13.27 |
A member of the Russian mafia is shot as Harm attempts to buy information pertaining to the whereabouts of his father, and Harm is accused of murdering him and now-civilian Mac must defend him. In the end, Harm receives a photo of his father in Russia and Mac returns to JAG.
| 48 | 11 | "Defenseless" | Tony Wharmby | Kimberly Costello | December 9, 1997 | 048 | 13.37 |
Harm and Mac work to defend a Navy Ensign who claims she killed a Turkish military attaché because she believed he was going to hurt her. At first Harm does not entirely believe Ensign Lang's story, but gradually becomes so convinced he rejects Chegwidden's advice to give in to political pressure and take the case.
| 49 | 12 | "Someone to Watch over Annie" | Greg Beeman | Stephen Zito | January 6, 1998 | 049 | 14.17 |
Harm tries to protect Annie Pendry (his best friend's widow in "Pilot Error") and her son, Josh, when he witnesses a murder on a class field trip to Andrews Air Force Base. A German weapons buyer for Saddam Hussein puts out a hit on the kid, then later kidnaps him. This is the second episode in a row in which Harm takes a woman to his apartment after she gets shot at her house.
| 50 | 13 | "With Intent to Die" | Winrich Kolbe | Larry Moskowitz | January 13, 1998 | 050 | 13.96 |
When an old mentor of Admiral Chegwidden's dies during a hunting trip with the Deputy Secretary of Defense, the coroner concludes it was suicide but Chegwidden remains convinced it was murder and starts his own investigation.
| 51 | 14 | "Father's Day" | Tony Wharmby | Dana Coen | February 3, 1998 | 051 | 12.78 |
A marine corporal accused of dereliction of duty steals a tank and engages the military in a stand-off because a conviction will guarantee that he will lose custody of his son. Donald P. Bellisario has an uncredited cameo in this episode as the guest of honor to a Quantum Leap convention at the Treetop Inn.
| 52 | 15 | "Yesterday's Heroes" | Greg Beeman | R. Scott Gemmill | February 24, 1998 | 052 | 13.17 |
Harm and Mac encounter three WWII vets (on of the three played by Ernest Borgnine) engaged in a guerrilla war with a South American drug kingpin. At Mac's suggestion, Bud goes to Naples, Florida, to meet Harriet's parents.
| 53 | 16 | "Chains of Command" | Tony Wharmby | Stephen Zito | March 3, 1998 | 053 | 13.67 |
A Chief aboard the USS Seahawk is accused of sexual harassment. He hires a civilian lawyer, Dalton Lowne (Mac's boyfriend), to defend him. The case becomes personal for Mac when Dalton shows up at her apartment to steal confidential information from her. At the end, the major trio sing the song, "What Becomes of the Brokenhearted".
| 54 | 17 | "The Stalker" | Scott Brazil | Larry Moskowitz | March 17, 1998 | 054 | 13.71 |
After her ex-boyfriend is gunned down, Mac tries to stay one step ahead of someone who is determined to get her. The Admiral's daughter, Francesca, from Italy pays a visit.
| 55 | 18 | "Tiger, Tiger" | Tony Wharmby | Thom Parham | March 24, 1998 | 055 | 14.29 |
A "Tiger" cruise for Navy personnel and their kids aboard an Oliver Hazard Perry-class frigate in the Gulf of Mexico turns deadly serious when Cuban terrorists seize the ship. Harm prevents the terrorists from using the ship's weapons to assassinate Fidel Castro while ensuring the hostages are not hurt. Harm brought along Annie's son Josh on the cruise without telling Annie about it. At the end of the episode, Bud proposes to Harriet almost at the same time Annie dumps Harm.
| 56 | 19 | "Death Watch" | Donald P. Bellisario | Donald P. Bellisario | March 31, 1998 | 057 | 13.81 |
Harm's mental state becomes questionable when he starts having flashbacks about Lieutenant Diane Schonke, who was murdered and the case closed when the prime suspect committed suicide. Mac finally learns of the woman who looked just like her.
| 57 | 20 | "The Imposter" | Alan J. Levi | R. Scott Gemmill | April 21, 1998 | 058 | 12.00 |
Disgraced ex-spy Special Agent Clark Palmer assumes Harm's identity to kill a key witness in a trial that Harm and Mac are prosecuting, leaving Harm to die in his booby-trapped apartment. Bud gives Harriet a ring.
| 58 | 21 | "The Return of Jimmy Blackhorse" | Alan J. Levi | Dana Coen | April 28, 1998 | 056 | 14.02 |
A Navajo medicine woman refuses to believe a coffin the Marines have brought really has the remains of her brother-in-law, Jimmy Blackhorse, a World War II Navajo code talker. The people refuse to allow DNA testing and are opposed to the Navy naming a ship after Jimmy. Harm and Mac go to New Zealand to find the answer, as well as a suggestion for the ship's name. Harm quits smoking cigars.
| 59 | 22 | "Clipped Wings" | Tony Wharmby | Stephen Zito | May 5, 1998 | 059 | 12.59 |
When an F-14 Tomcat clips an Italian helicopter, killing 6 people, Harm and Mac must face each other in court and an Italian government eager to prosecute the pilot themselves. With the help of Francesca (Chegwidden's daughter), Harm finds a teenage girl who piloted the craft that actually collided with the F-14, a small plane she flew without her father's permission. (Note: The episode was aired three months after American pilots clipped the cables supporting a cable car near Cavalese, Italy, killing 20 civilians.)
| 60 | 23 | "Wedding Bell Blues" | Alan J. Levi | Story by : Larry Moskowitz; Teleplay by : R. Scott Gemmill & Stephen Zito | May 12, 1998 | 060 | 13.37 |
Bud and Harriet's wedding preparations are complicated when Harriet's domineering mother tries to take over the planning and brings her to the strip club for her bachelorette party. The wedding plans are further derailed when Harm — who is to be Bud's best man and commander of the honor guard at the wedding — loses his dress whites due to a mix-up at the laundromat and then a chain of events at Bud's bachelor party ends in a mass brawl that lands Harm, Bud and the Admiral in the lock-up. Meanwhile, Bud Jr. is concerned that his father Bud Sr. is abusive of his younger brother, Mikey, whom he believes does not want to enlist in the Navy against their father's wishes. After getting out of jail, Bud Jr. marries Harriet in a military wedding concluding with an honor guard commanded by Harm.
| 61 | 24 | "To Russia with Love" | Tony Wharmby | Larry Moskowitz & Donald P. Bellisario | May 19, 1998 | 061 | 12.13 |
Harm receives a picture which suggests that, after the Vietnam War ended, his father was sent to Siberia in the Soviet Union. Harm requests leave to California, which Chegwidden immediately suspects is really to go to Russia. Chegwidden reluctantly grants the leave and sends Mac along with Harm. After visiting his mother in California, Harm proceeds to Russia, where he is assisted by a taxi driver named Alexei who claims to be loyal only to the highest bidder. In Russia, Harm and Mac once again encounter Mark "Falcon" Sokol and Colonel Parlovsky. The trail points to Beloyka in Northern Siberia. Harm and Mac steal a MIG-29 to go to Beloyka, but before they can go far, they are chased and fired upon. Note: This season closes with a cliffhanger which is continued in season four, "Gypsy Eyes."
