= JAG season 4 =

JAG
- Season 4
- Starring: David James Elliott; Catherine Bell; Patrick Labyorteaux; John M. Jackson; Karri Turner; Trevor Goddard
- No. of episodes: 24

Release
- Original network: CBS
- Original release: September 22, 1998 – May 25, 1999

Season chronology
- ← Previous; Season 3 Next → Season 5

The fourth season of JAG premiered on CBS on September 22, 1998, and concluded on May 25, 1999. The season, starring David James Elliott and Catherine Bell, was produced by Belisarius Productions in association with Paramount Television.

== Plot ==
Marine Major Sarah "Mac" MacKenzie (Catherine Bell), a Duke graduate, and Lieutenant Commander Harmon "Harm" Rabb Jr. (David James Elliott), a former naval aviator, work at the Headquarters of the Judge Advocate General, the internal law firm of the Department of the Navy which investigates, prosecutes and defends cases under the Uniform Code of Military Justice (UCMJ).

This season, Harm and Mac are assumed dead following an altercation with a Russian fighter pilot ("Gypsy Eyes"), however after punching out of their plane before impact, they begin a journey to uncover the truth about Harm's father. Later, Harm and Mac head several investigations including an undercover operation at an embassy ("Embassy"), the suspected rape of a Japanese national ("Innocence"), an escape from a VA hospital ("The Martin Baker Fan Club"), an execution on national television ("Act of Terror"), and a pilot who defied direct orders after hearing the voice of God ("Angels 30"). Meanwhile, Bud (Patrick Labyorteaux) is promoted to Lieutenant ("The Adversaries"), Harriet Sims (Karri Turner) is promoted to Lieutenant J.G. ("Rivers' Run"), Mac's "little sister" Chloe (Mae Whitman) arrives at JAG shortly before Christmas ("Jaggle Bells"), Rear Admiral A.J. Chegwidden (John M. Jackson) rescues his daughter from the Italian Mafia ("Going After Francesca"), and Royal Australian Navy Commander Mic Brumby (Trevor Goddard) arrives in the United States as an exchange officer ("Mr. Rabb Goes to Washington"). Also this season, Harm receives combat orders and departs JAG ("Goodbyes"), Mac and Harm make a pact to have children together ("Yeah, Baby"), and both Clayton Webb (Steven Culp) and Admiral Chegwidden heads to Italy to rescue a common mentor from captivity ("Soul Searching").

== Production ==
During this season the production team filmed partially on location in Washington, D.C. for scenes for a few episodes with the main characters. By this point, the United States Navy was now enthusiastic about its support to the series, "We treated JAG the way we would any other production," according to Captain Ron Morse at Navy Office of Information West, the Los Angeles-based liaison office with the entertainment industry, "We look at the scripts, the principal characters and how they respond to the situations they're presented." And both Harm and Mac was clearly to their liking, "[t]hey're attractive, smart, dedicated individuals who behave the way naval officers should and know what they're doing." In summation, "[w]e found JAG to reflect well on the Navy."

This season also advertised the National Center for Missing and Exploited Children, while the telephone number 1-800-The-Lost was featured in the closing credits of the season finale, "Goodbyes".

== Reception ==
During its fourth season, JAG's ratings were "up 11 percent in households, 8 percent in adults 18-49 and 10 percent in adults 25-54" when compared to the third season, positioning the series as the fourteenth most watched show in household ratings in the United States.

Michael Kilian in Chicago Tribune opined that at this point in the series, in contrast to JAG's first more action oriented season, "the scripts have become much more intelligent and the stories more realistic, sophisticated and personal" and that the series had "carved itself a niche in the viewing audience" as the "numerous fan Internet sites attest."

== Cast and characters ==
=== Main ===
- David James Elliott as Harmon Rabb Jr., Lieutenant Commander
- Catherine Bell as Sarah MacKenzie, Major in the Marine Corps.
- Patrick Labyorteaux as Bud Roberts, Lieutenant J.G. (later, Lieutenant)
- John M. Jackson as A. J. Chegwidden, Rear Admiral

=== Also starring ===
- Karri Turner as Harriet Sims, Ensign (later, Lieutenant J.G.)
- Trevor Goddard as Mic Brumby, Lieutenant Commander, RAN

=== Recurring ===
- Paul Collins as Alexander Nelson, Secretary of the Navy
- W.K. Stratton as Theodore Lindsey, Commander
- Sibel Galindez as Elizabeth Hawkes, "Skates", Lieutenant
- Steven Culp as Clayton Webb, CIA Agent
- Chuck Carrington as Jason Tiner, Petty Officer
- Harrison Page as Stiles Morris, Rear Admiral
- Claudette Nevins as Porter Webb, NSA Agent
- Michael Bellisario as Michael Roberts
- Anne-Marie Johnson as Roberta Latham, Congresswoman
- Dana Sparks as Carolyn Imes, Commander
- Rex Linn as Mark Falcon, KGB Agent
- Susan Haskell as Jordan Parker, Lieutenant Commander
- Mae Whitman as Chloe Maddison

== Episodes ==
No. overall	No. in season	Title	Directed by	Written by	Original release date	Prod. code	US viewers (millions)
62	1	"Gypsy Eyes"	Tony Wharmby	Donald P. Bellisario	September 22, 1998	064	15.80
After events in season three, "To Russia with Love," Harm updates the viewer (with voice-over narration) about the search for his MIA father. The Russians claim Harm and Mac died while on a demo ride in a MIG-29. The truth is they punched out before the plane was hit by an air-to-air missile. They encounter a Gypsy brother and sister, Vasya (Eric Zivot) and Rusza (Natasha Pavlovich), who take them by wagon to a train station and dress them up as gypsies. Rusza has a vision in which Russian soldiers rape her and kill Harm before he can save her. Harm is convinced the vision will not come true. At the train station, before Harm and Mac can get on the train to Beloyka, they are detected by Falcon (Rex Linn). After some hesitation, they decide to trust him and let him take them back to Moscow, where they find Admiral Chegwidden, Clayton Webb and Alexei (Allan Kolman), who is in fact a double agent most loyal to the CIA, because they pay him the best. Harm and Mac finally arrive in Svischevo, where they meet a woman who cared for Harmon Rabb Sr. after he escaped from Vorkuta. The woman tells a story which is the same as Rusza's vision, except with Harm Sr. instead of Harm Jr., and herself instead of Rusza. The woman says Harm Sr. died and was buried in an unmarked grave in the Taiga.
63	2	"Embassy"	Alan J. Levi	R. Scott Gemmill	September 29, 1998	063	14.41
Harm and Mac aids Clayton Webb in an undercover CIA investigation during a reception held at the Sudanese embassy in Washington, D.C., which later on becomes a life-or-death struggle when a rebel group seizes the building with Harm and Mac trapped inside, along with an influential Sudanese intellectual, Professor Dubotu (Bennet Guillory), who has been kidnapped. Mac is taken hostage. Harm learns that what looks like a terrorist takeover is a masquerade that has been engineered by crooked Sudanese Ambassador Moshak (Vincent Riotta). Harm manages to communicate to the outside through the live news feeds by using Morse code while intentionally failing to light a cigar. Nevertheless, Ambassador Moshak has in his possession vials of Ebola. Bud notices that Harriet seems to be suffering from more than just flu symptoms.
64	3	"Innocence"	Tony Wharmby	Dana Coen	October 6, 1998	062	14.93
The episode starts with a softball game with JAG HQ versus the Navy Chaplains, however a delicate situation with respect to US - Japan relations prompts Admiral Chegwidden to send Harm, Mac and Bud to Japan. Ensign Terry Guitry (Sean Murray) is accused of raping a Japanese woman, and the case is made even more difficult by off-the-cuff comments to the press from the commanding officer of the defendant (Muse Watson). Harm and Mac must struggle with both the Japanese legal system (the disparities between Japanese and American courtroom procedures make for a culture clash) and reluctant witnesses to clear the young man who has a life imprisonment sentence awaiting him if he is found guilty.
65	4	"Going After Francesca"	Alan J. Levi	Stephen Zito	October 13, 1998	065	14.71
After Admiral Chegwidden's daughter, Francesca (Giuliana Santini), is kidnapped in Rome, Italy, Chegwidden meets with his ex-wife, Marcella (Barbara Carrera), and her husband, a wealthy Italian businessman, to get more background on Francesca's friends and enemies. Chegwidden learns that Francesca was seriously involved with the heir to a Mafia family. A Navy chief warrant officer (Steve Rankin) faces a court-martial for stealing five Stinger missiles illegally resold to Iran, which may have something to do with the kidnapping. All leads points to the fact that Francesca is caught in the middle of a business deal gone awry, and now it's up to Chegwidden and Harm to rescue her.
66	5	"The Martin Baker Fan Club"	Tony Wharmby	Dana Coen	October 20, 1998	066	14.21
Psychotic Vietnam War veteran Roscoe Martin (Kevin Conway), withholds anti-psychotic medication from a fellow patient in a war-stress recovery unit at a VA hospital, and after the patient leaps out a window during a subsequent hallucination, a second-degree murder charge is leveled at Martin, and Harm takes on the case pro bono. Disappointed with the direction of the case, Roscoe feels that the cards are stacked against him and engineers an escape from the VA hospital with three other patients. Their escape takes them to Harm's apartment, and a negotiable situation turns deadly when guns are drawn and a SWAT team swoops in to help with what it sees as a hostage situation.
67	6	"Act of Terror"	Alan J. Levi	Larry Moskowitz	October 27, 1998	067	15.52
A misguided Marine Corps corporal shoots an arrested terrorist suspect live on national television. With Mac prosecuting, she and Harm are pitted against each other in the courtroom in what would seem like an open and shut case of cold-blooded murder. Harm is replaced by civilian defense attorney Juanita Ressler (Tina Lifford), Mac's former law professor from Duke who back then had claimed Mac would make a better lap dancer than attorney. As other discrepancies crop up, Harm decides to do some investigating of his own and begins to untangle a tangled web involving FBI special agent Marvin Novack (Shashawnee Hall) (who tried to get Harm convicted for murder last season in "People v. Rabb") and he discovers that Juanita Ressler's high fees are being paid by the "super-patriot" industrialist, Percival Bertram (Barry Corbin), with shady business ties to Saudi Arabia.
68	7	"Angels 30"	Tony Wharmby	R. Scott Gemmill	November 3, 1998	068	15.14
When an F-14 Tomcat pilot claims he heard the voice of God tell him not to fire on an attacking Iraqi plane, Harm and Mac are sent to investigate his claim. Despite the pilot's assertions that he heard God, Harm insists on finding a more scientific explanation. When Harm fails from the ground to discover the origination of the voice, he suggests that the pilot should duplicate his earlier mission to see what they can learn about the incident in the sky.
69	8	"Mr. Rabb Goes to Washington"	Jeannot Szwarc	Stephen Zito	November 10, 1998	069	17.11
Part 1 of 2: ZNN star reporter Norman Delaporte (Barry Jenner) claims to have evidence that U.S. troops used chemical weapons against expatriate Americans during the Gulf War. Harm is assigned to assist Congresswoman Bobbi Latham (Anne-Marie Johnson) in a House Subcommittee on National Security investigation into whether ZNN allegations are true. At the same time, Mac's ex-husband and ex-convict Chris Ragle (Joe Lando) shows up looking for money. Royal Australian Navy Lieutenant Commander Mic Brumby (Trevor Goddard) joins the office as an exchange officer. It turns out the ZNN allegation was a sensationalist fraud, and Harm rhetorically asks why the public should believe ratings-driven reporters over ordinary service members who bears the real cost of war.
70	9	"People v. Mac"	Tony Wharmby	Larry Moskowitz	November 17, 1998	070	16.18
Part 2 of 2: Chris Ragle (Joe Lando) is found dead in a hotel room and Mac faces trial on charges of murdering her estranged husband. Harm, representing Mac, and Mic Brumby, representing Mac's former CO and lover, Lieutenant Colonel John Farrow (Ben Murphy), clash when Mic's defense strategy places the blame on Mac. Farrow claims he deliberately killed Chris, while Mac claims that she killed Chris. Harm and Bud feels that neither defendant has come clean with the truth and they begin to search for hard evidence. The key witness in the case turns out to be a major surprise to both defendants, and he testifies that Mac accidentally killed Chris in self defense when he pulled a gun on her. Commander Ted Lindsey (W.K. Stratton) leads the prosecution and permanently alienates himself from the JAG HQ regulars.
71	10	"The Black Jet"	Jeannot Szwarc	David Zabel	November 24, 1998	071	16.06
Harm and Mac's mission is to represent Navy test pilot, Harm's friend Lieutenant Commander Jack Keeter (Michael McGrady), whose carrier modified Stealth jet is thought to have crashed in Iran due to a mechanical failure, and is now facing trial for espionage. But when Keeter slips Harm a message indicating that the $80 million plane did not crash and is hidden, the assignment becomes nearly impossible: get the pilot, and the costly aircraft, back to the U.S. without letting the Iranians know that the plane is intact.
72	11	"Jaggle Bells"	Greg Beeman	R. Scott Gemmill	December 15, 1998	072	16.44
Right before Christmas a snowstorm hits Washington, D.C. and JAG Headquarters is nearly empty. A sudden appearance by Mac's "little sister", precocious preteen student Chloe Madison (Mae Whitman), keeps Mac busy trying to locate the absentee parents, as well as investigate her claims of abuse as she claims her stepfather is responsible for the bruise on her arm. Harm spends the evening with Navy psychiatrist Jordan Parker (Susan Haskell), accused of DUI. Mac's sister turns out to be the daughter of a sailor who she believed had died in the 1987 USS Stark incident. Admiral Chegwidden tries in vain to get a plane to Italy to see his daughter. After failing to get a commercial plane, Bud finally gets him a spot on a C-130. The episode is followed by a message: Happy Holidays; Especially to the Men and Women of Our Armed Forces
73	12	"Dungaree Justice"	Hugo Cortina	David Zabel	January 12, 1999	073	16.68
Part 1 of 2: A civilian bar owner is severely beaten by three sailors, who claim the man raped a female shipmate, Lopez. But it turns out that the man is actually impotent due to an injury he suffered in Vietnam. Harm and Mac eventually discover Lopez was left at the bar by herself, and that all the bar owner did was to take her to the backseat of her car, where she was later raped by one of her shipmates. The episode's last couple of minutes are a preview of the next episode.
74	13	"War Stories"	Greg Beeman	Dana Coen	January 13, 1999	074	15.56
Part 2 of 2: A hostage situation on the Balkans gone bad results in the SEAL team being blamed for their deaths. Mac and Bud are assigned to defend their team leader, Commander Risnicki, but Risnicki is wary of Bud's lack of experience. While on mandatory leave, and with Harm at the helm at JAG HQ, Admiral Chegwidden gets roped into the world of being a technical advisor for the film Field of Gold, which happens to be a Navy-themed action adventure with a court-martial.
75	14	"Webb of Lies"	Mark Horowitz	R. Scott Gemmill	February 9, 1999	075	15.43
When CIA Agent Clayton Webb is supposedly killed, Harm and Mac must once again face off with Clark Palmer (Peter Murnik), who is trying to acquire the high-tech Japanese weapons system Webb was carrying.
76	15	"Rivers' Run"	Greg Beeman	Larry Moskowitz	February 16, 1999	076	17.22
When Lieutenant Curtis Rivers (Montel Williams) seemingly kills a 14-year-old boy during a training exercise in the Appalachian Mountains, Harm and Mac must defend him before a "kangaroo court" of anti-government separatists. The Navy SEALs were diverted from their normal training ground in an effort by FBI special agent Al Grenin (Marty Rackham) to involve them in the hunt for fugitive Warren Toobin (Richard Speight Jr.). Harriet Sims is promoted to the grade of Lieutenant (junior grade).
77	16	"Silent Service"	Alan J. Levi	Dana Coen	February 23, 1999	077	16.37
A series of mishaps aboard a Navy submarine require a squabbling Harm and Mac to share very close quarters. But when the mishaps become fatal, the two put aside their differences and figure out who is trying to injure the crew. Harm figures out that it's the ship's chief medical officer, whose service record includes three incidents in which he cured relatively rare diseases.
78	17	"Nobody's Child"	Tony Wharmby	Stephen Zito	March 2, 1999	078	15.80
The unidentified body of a young girl strikes a nerve in Harm, and he pulls out all the stops to find out who she was and why someone killed her, as Harriet deals with her own emotions regarding the case. Bud is given his lawyer insignia. Harm and Lieutenant Commander Teresa Coulter (Trisha Yearwood) go to Maryland where they identify the dead girl and find her sister. (Note: The end of "Nobody's Child" gives the phone number for the National Committee to Prevent Child Abuse.)
79	18	"Shakedown"	Alan J. Levi	R. Scott Gemmill	March 30, 1999	079	15.31
The installation of new systems on the aircraft carrier USS Coral Sea causes a blackout during combat operations and Harm and Mac are dispatched to investigate. Harm suspects the civilian hazmat technician Newman (David Graf), while Mac suspects another civilian technician, the electrician Yarbrough (Jack Conley). There is a big power outage and one million dollars are stolen from the ship's disbursing office in a joint plan by both men. Harm has a Navy psychiatrist examine the little girl he and Teresa Coulter (Trisha Yearwood) discovered in the previous episode.
80	19	"The Adversaries"	Tony Wharmby	Story by : Dana Coen and Larry Moskowitz; Teleplay by : Larry Moskowitz	April 13, 1999	080	13.22
After being promoted, Bud's first case as an attorney is defending his father "Big Bud" Roberts (Jeff MacKay) from charges of fraud and larceny, with Harm as the prosecutor. Bud Jr. gets the charges against his father dismissed at the Article 32 hearing, but out of court Harm orders Bud Sr. to never tell his son the truth and he won't either. (Note: This episode was dedicated to the memory of Edward S. Vance.)
81	20	"Second Sight"	Terrence O'Hara	Dana Coen	April 27, 1999	081	14.42
Mac has trouble dealing with her resentment for her father who is about to die at a Catholic hospice in California. Harm's civilian doctor tells him that he was misdiagnosed with night blindness and that his actual vision problem can be corrected with laser eye surgery. At the end, Mac's mother (Conchata Ferrell) shows up and tells her what she did after leaving her with her father.
82	21	"Wilderness of Mirrors"	Alan J. Levi	Paul Levine	May 4, 1999	082	14.06
Former DSD Agent Clark Palmer (Peter Murnik) pretends to be Harm's father and makes him think he's hallucinating. Palmer kidnaps Jordan Parker (Susan Haskell). The Admiral enlists the help of Bud, Mac, and Mic while preparing to argue a case before the U.S. Supreme Court, with Bud acting as mock Chief Justice.
83	22	"Soul Searching"	Jeannot Szwarc	Donald P. Bellisario	May 11, 1999	083	13.10
Admiral Chegwidden and Clayton Webb go to Italy to rescue Webb's mentor (who saved Chegwidden's life in Vietnam) from Italian terrorists who are going to sell him to Serbian extremists if they can't get him free in time. At home, Harm deals with the loss of his Corvette while Bud and Harriet shop for a family vehicle.
84	23	"Yeah, Baby"	Alan J. Levi	R. Scott Gemmill	May 18, 1999	084	14.21
Harm puts in his paperwork to return to flight status, and the SECNAV approves because he wants Harm out of Washington. Bud prosecutes a Marine sergeant who got herself pregnant by a subordinate, and she goes into labor at the same time as Harriet. On the steps of JAG HQ, Harm and Mac agree to come together for a child in 5 years if they're both still single.
85	24	"Goodbyes"	Jeannot Szwarc	Stephen Zito	May 25, 1999	085	12.92
Charlie Lynch resurfaces (after events in "Nobody's Child") and threatens the twin sister of the girl he killed. Harm tracks Lynch down to a ship he used to serve on and gets him to release Dar-lin before killing him. After saying goodbye to the little girl, Harm returns to JAG where Chegwidden tells him he has orders for Florida and gives him one last chance to cancel those orders and stay at JAG. Harm declines and leaves, especially after receiving F-14 and NATOPS manuals from Lieutenant Elizabeth "Skates" Hawkes (Sibel Ergener).

== See also ==
- 1998–99 United States network television schedule
