= JAG season 2 =

JAG
- Season 2
- Starring: David James Elliott; Catherine Bell; Patrick Labyorteaux; John M. Jackson; Karri Turner
- No. of episodes: 15

Release
- Original network: CBS
- Original release: January 3 – April 18, 1997

Season chronology
- ← Previous; Season 1 (on NBC) Next → Season 3

The second season of JAG premiered on CBS on January 3, 1997, and concluded on April 18, 1997. The season, starring David James Elliott and Catherine Bell, was produced by Belisarius Productions in association with Paramount Television.

The first season of JAG aired on NBC and JAG began its second season on CBS as a mid-season replacement for Mr. & Mrs. Smith.

== Plot ==
Following in his father's footsteps as a Naval Aviator, Lieutenant Commander Harmon Rabb, Jr. suffered a crash while landing his Tomcat on a storm-tossed carrier at sea. Diagnosed with night-blindness, Harm transferred to the Navy's Judge Advocate General Corps, which investigates, defends, and prosecutes the law of the sea. (Note: Actually, the law that JAG does prosecute and defend criminal cases under is named the Uniform Code of Military Justice (UCMJ) and its various articles are frequently referenced to in the episodes. The law of the sea, on the other hand, is actually a United Nations convention, which the United States has decided not to ratify due to sovereignty issues.) There, with fellow JAG lawyer Major Sarah MacKenzie, he now fights in and out of the courtroom, with the same daring and tenacity that made him a top gun in the air. - 2nd and 3rd season opening narration, read by Don LaFontaine

By-the-book Marine Major Sarah "Mac" MacKenzie (Catherine Bell) and Lieutenant Commander Harmon "Harm" Rabb Jr. (David James Elliott), a former naval aviator, work at the Headquarters of the Judge Advocate General, the internal law firm of the Department of the Navy. Now stationed out of Falls Church, Virginia, they prosecute, defend, and investigate a plethora of cases including the theft of the Declaration of Independence by a right-wing militia ("We the People"), a brig-break ("Secrets"), superstition in a flying squadron as planes crash supposedly due to the bombing of a mosque during the 1991 Gulf War ("Jinx"), and a sexual harassment allegation by a female fighter pilot ("Crossing the Line"). Meanwhile, Harm finds himself in hot-water when he fires a machine gun during a tense courtroom battle ("Heroes"), Mac hones her Russian language skills ("Cowboys & Cossacks"), and Rear Admiral A.J. Chegwidden (John M. Jackson) becomes the target of a serial killer from his past ("Ghosts"). Also this season, Lieutenant junior grade Bud Roberts (Patrick Labyorteaux) joins JAG at the behest of outgoing Lieutenant Meg Austin (Tracey Needham) ("We the People"), Mac confronts her past ("Rendezvous"), and Harm goes undercover as a Gunnery Sergeant ("Force Recon").

== Production ==
For its second season, JAG moved from NBC to CBS. Donald P. Bellisario had previously received offers from CBS and ABC to pick up the series, which was reworked to be one of both "legal [drama] and action". Following the departure of series co-star Tracey Needham, Catherine Bell was cast in the lead role of Major Sarah "Mac" MacKenzie. Bellisario and CBS President Leslie Moonves "cast Catherine Bell, and [Bellisario] never heard another word from [Moonves] - who took great delight in the fact that it was part of the building block that started the CBS turnaround". On her casting, Catherine Bell stated that she "guest starred on the season finale in the first season and there was another girl playing the female lead opposite Harm [...] One of the days when I was working, he announced that the show had been canceled, but CBS picked up the show and they decided to recast the female lead. I went after the role and wrote Don a letter after I had read the breakdown for Mac and they brought me in. Six callbacks later, I got the role."

== Cast and characters ==
=== Main ===
- David James Elliott as Harmon Rabb, Jr., Lieutenant Commander
- Catherine Bell as Sarah MacKenzie, Major in the Marine Corps.
- Patrick Labyorteaux as Bud Roberts, Lieutenant J.G.
- John M. Jackson as A. J. Chegwidden, Rear Admiral

=== Also starring ===
- Karri Turner as Harriet Sims, Ensign

=== Recurring cast (more than once this season) ===
- Terry O'Quinn as Captain Thomas Boone, USN, USS Seahawk "CAG"
- Steven Culp as Clayton Webb, CIA officer
- Chuck Carrington as Petty Officer Jason Tiner
- Harrison Page as Captain Stiles Morris (judge)
- Leon Russom as Gayle Osbourne, CIA operative
- Claudette Nevins as Porter Webb, retired NSA Agent

=== Guest appearances ===
- Carmen Argenziano as Colonel Matthew O'Hara, USMC
- Tom O'Brien as Captain Cahill, USMC
- Victor Love as Corporal Jason Magida, USMC
- Nancy Everhard as Lieutenant Marilyn Isaacs, USN
- Sibel Galindez as Lieutenant Elizabeth "Skates" Hawkes, USN
- Dee Wallace as Congresswoman Adele DeLong
- Phil Morris as Captain Koonan, USMC

== Episodes ==
No. overall	No. in season	Title	Directed by	Written by	Original release date	Prod. code	US viewers (millions)
23	1	"We the People"	Les Landau	Donald P. Bellisario	January 3, 1997	025	12.32
The episode starts near Yuma, Arizona with a military helicopter stopping a U.S. Mail truck and stealing its well-packaged cargo, which turns out to be the Declaration of Independence. After having received the Distinguished Flying Cross for his actions in the pilot episode at a White House Rose Garden ceremony, Lieutenant Commander Harmon "Harm" Rabb, Jr. and his new partner, Major Sarah "Mac" MacKenzie, and their assistant Lieutenant JG Bud Roberts are tasked by the Judge Advocate General, Rear Admiral A.J. Chegwidden, to investigate the theft and the alleged involvement of Marine Colonel Matthew O'Hara (Carmen Argenziano), a Vietnam War veteran and recipient of the Medal of Honor, in cooperation with Clayton Webb (Steven Culp), who goes by the title of "Special Assistant to the Under Secretary of State" (but Mac hints at that it is a just a cover for the CIA). Ascertaining the involvement of the famed Marine colonel is soon resolved when his men commandeers a ZNN satellite uplink and Colonel O'Hara broadcasts his message from the right-wing militia "The Defenders" on live television and demands a ransom to bring the document back. As they get to Arizona, Harm figures out that O'Hara is Mac’s uncle and together they then set out to get him to surrender peacefully before Webb finds him. Meanwhile Bud stays to keep an eye on Webb. While O'Hara is willing to surrender for the sake of his niece, dissension among his men follows. The concluding scene shows a brief snippet of Colonel O'Hara in a courtroom. (Note: This episode marks the first appearance of recurring character Clayton Webb.)
24	2	"Secrets"	Ray Austin	Tom Towler	January 10, 1997	028	12.64
Marine Corporal Jason Magida (Victor Love), whom Admiral Chegwidden prosecuted more than eight years ago, escapes from the brig in Groton, Connecticut, and takes Admiral Chegwidden, Mac, and Bud as hostages inside the Admiral's office. He demands a retrial here and now in the admiral's office; a court had convicted him of giving classified information about the Patriot missile system to Israel. Harm and CIA officer Clayton Webb work from the outside to rescue them without killing the corporal. They also must be wary of shady CIA operative Gayle Osbourne (Leon Russom), who may try to prevent a revelation of the truth about the corporal's case.
25	3	"Jinx"	Jerry Jameson	Jack Orman	January 17, 1997	027	11.56
Harm must prove that an F-14 Tomcat aircraft that accidentally bombed a mosque during Operation Desert Storm is not "jinxed" after a mid-air accident kills his best friend.
26	4	"Heroes"	Tony Wharmby	R. Scott Gemmill	January 24, 1997	026	13.13
Harm and Mac engage in a tense courtroom battle when a Navy SEAL is accused of murdering his friend during a mission. Harm goes way overboard to prove a point about firearms, by firing an MP5 in the courtroom. (Note: This marks first episode of the series in which a trial takes place in the JAG HQ courtroom.)
27	5	"Crossing the Line"	Tony Wharmby	Stephen Zito	January 31, 1997	029	11.91
Harm, Mac and Bud are sent out to the USS Seahawk and face political pressure when a female F-14 Tomcat pilot, Lieutenant Marilyn Isaacs (Nancy Everhard), accuses the CAG, Captain Thomas Boone (Terry O'Quinn), of sexual harassment. The CAG says she is simply a bad aviator, gender notwithstanding, and prominent Congresswoman Adele DeLong (Dee Wallace) intervenes in the investigation. Bud meets his successor as the public affairs officer, Ensign Harriet Sims (Karri Turner) and they soon form a bond. (Note: "Crossing the Line" marks the first appearance of recurring characters Harriet Sims and Lieutenant Elizabeth "Skates" Hawkes.)
28	6	"Trinity"	Alan J. Levi	Jack Orman	February 7, 1997	024	11.71
The infant son of a female U.S. Navy officer (daughter of CINCPAC) is kidnapped from Holy Loch Naval Base in Scotland and the evidence implicates the boy's father, an Irish Republican Army leader. Harm and Mac are assigned to work with the Royal Ulster Constabulary in Belfast to help get the child back, but the local cop is hiding a vengeful secret.
29	7	"Ghosts"	Ray Austin	Story by : Brian Nelson and R. Scott Gemmill; Teleplay by : R. Scott Gemmill	February 14, 1997	030	11.14
Admiral Chegwidden's life is in danger when the last surviving members of his SEAL team from the Vietnam War are killed and it appears someone is eliminating the witnesses to an atrocity committed 30 years earlier.
30	8	"Full Engagement"	Alan J. Levi	Jack Orman	February 21, 1997	031	12.25
When Harm's Stearman biplane runs out of fuel in the Appalachian Mountains, he and Mac must avoid trigger happy poachers who killed a game warden and do not want to leave any witnesses.
31	9	"Washington Holiday"	Joe Napolitano	Stephen Zito	February 28, 1997	032	12.62
Harm is assigned to escort Romanian Princess Alexandra (Kiersten Warren) while her father, the King of Romania (Michael Des Barres), is in Washington D.C. to request Romania be admitted to NATO, as an assassin closes in on all of them. (Note: In real life, Romania has not restored its monarchy; but it did join NATO seven years after this episode's airdate.) (Note: Nanci Chambers guest stars as the assassin; Chambers would later on in the series act as recurring character Lieutenant Loren Singer.)
32	10	"The Game of Go"	Ray Austin	Tom Towler	February 28, 1997	023	11.70
Harm and a Colombian drug lord play a high-stakes game of "Go", with the prize being a Marine that was left behind during a covert mission, as Webb and the JAG team once again butt heads.
33	11	"Force Recon"	Alan J. Levi	Story by : Tom Towler and R. Scott Gemmill; Teleplay by : Tom Towler and Stephen Zito	March 7, 1997	033	11.05
Harm goes undercover as a Gunny for a Marine Force Recon Squad at Camp Pendelton, while Mac and Bud investigate whether their Captain Koonan (Phil Morris), known as The Duke like in John Wayne, is using unsafe techniques as a means of hardening his men for unexpected combat conditions.
34	12	"The Guardian"	Michael Schultz	Jack Orman	March 28, 1997	035	10.89
Harm and Mac defend a homeless former Navy SEAL (Bruce Weitz), who is accused of killing three men while thwarting a convenience store robbery.
35	13	"Code Blue"	Tony Wharmby	R. Scott Gemmill	April 4, 1997	036	12.07
Harm and Mac are out running and Harm saves Mac from getting hit by a car by taking the blow himself. When Hamas takes over the DC hospital where an Israeli diplomat is undergoing a heart transplant, an injured Harm becomes the inside man of the FBI hostage negotiator to thwart the terrorists. This episode shows Mac speaking fluent Persian.
36	14	"Cowboys & Cossacks"	Tony Wharmby	R. Scott Gemmill	April 11, 1997	034	12.13
A joint exercise between American and Russian naval forces in the Black Sea becomes deadly when the two captains decide to settle their Cold War grudges, trapping Harm, Mac and Bud in the middle. This episode shows Mac can speak at least a little Russian. (Note: To simulate the explosion of the Russian ship, real footage from the Falklands War was used. It shows HMS Ardent blowing up during the attempt to defuse an aircraft dropped bomb.)
37	15	"Rendezvous"	Duwayne Dunham	Craig Tepper	April 18, 1997	037	10.63
Mac's past clouds her judgment while she defends an abusive Chief Petty Officer accused of killing his wife's boyfriend.

== See also ==
- 1996–97 United States network television schedule
