= First Monday =

Television series

- Genre: Legal drama
- Created by: Donald P. Bellisario; Paul Levine
- Starring: Joe Mantegna; James Garner; Charles Durning; Hedy Burress; Randy Vasquez; Christopher Wiehl; Joe Flanigan
- Theme music composer: Bruce Broughton
- Country of origin: United States
- Original language: English
- No. of seasons: 1
- No. of episodes: 13

Production
- Executive producer: Donald P. Bellisario
- Producers: David Bellisario; Lynnie Green; Richard Levine; Joe Mantegna
- Running time: 44 minutes
- Production companies: Belisarius Productions; Paramount Television

Original release
- Network: CBS
- Release: January 15 – May 3, 2002

First Monday is an American legal drama television series which aired on CBS during the midseason replacement from January 15 to May 3, 2002. The series centered on the U.S. Supreme Court. Like another 2002 series, The Court, it was inspired by the prominent role the Supreme Court played in settling the 2000 presidential election. However, public interest in the Supreme Court had receded by the time the two shows premiered, and neither was successful.

== Premise ==
Created by JAG creator Donald P. Bellisario and Paul Levine, the show aired on CBS from January until May 2002. The name First Monday is a reference to the first Monday in October, which is when each Supreme Court term begins.

Joe Mantegna starred as moderate Justice Joseph Novelli, who is appointed to a Supreme Court evenly divided between conservatives and liberals. The show examined how the law clerks and justices dealt with issues and cases that came before the highest court in the United States.

First Monday generally dealt with two issues per episode. Earlier in the series, that tended to be two cases. Later in the series, that tended to be one case and one personal issue.

== Characters ==
The main cast of First Monday. Clockwise from bottom right are: Joe Mantegna, James Garner, Joe Flanigan, Hedy Burress, Randy Vasquez, and Christopher Wiehl.

=== Main ===
- Justice Joseph Novelli (Joe Mantegna), a newly appointed moderate Supreme Court Justice
- Chief Justice Thomas Brankin (James Garner), the football-obsessed, conservative Chief Justice of the United States
- Justice Henry Hoskins (Charles Durning), Brankin's best friend and a conservative justice, who often spouted limericks during conversation
- Miguel Mora (Randy Vasquez), Novelli's conservative law clerk
- Ellie Pearson (Hedy Burress), Novelli's liberal law clerk
- Jerry Klein (Christopher Wiehl), Novelli's moderate law clerk
- Julian Lodge (Joe Flanigan), Brankin's law clerk

=== Other Supreme Court Justices ===
- Justice Esther Weisenberg (Camille Saviola), a liberal justice
- Justice Jerome Morris (James McEachin), a liberal justice
- Justice Michael Bancroft (James Karen), a liberal justice
- Justice Deborah Szwark (Gail Strickland), a conservative justice
- Justice Theodore Snow (Stephen Markle), a liberal justice
- Justice Brian Chandler (Lyman Ward), a conservative justice

=== Novelli's family ===
- Sarah Novelli (Linda Purl), a real estate agent and Justice Joseph Novelli's wife
- Andrew Novelli (Brandon Davis), Justice Joseph Novelli's son
- Beth Novelli (Rachel Grate), Justice Joseph Novelli's daughter

=== Others ===
- Charles Bierbauer (himself), host of Curveball, a political talk show
- Senator Edward Sheffield (Dean Stockwell), a liberal U.S. Senator who plotted to get Novelli impeached. Following the show's cancellation, Sheffield became a recurring character on JAG. The character later became the Secretary of the Navy.

== Episodes ==
No.	Title	Directed by	Written by	Original release date	U.S. viewers (millions)
1	"First Monday"	Donald P. Bellisario	Story by : Donald P. Bellisario & Paul Levine; Teleplay by : Donald P. Bellisario	January 15, 2002	14.50
Case 1: A Florida death row inmate is struck by lightning, diminishing his mental capacity. The justices must determine whether executing him violates the Eighth Amendment's prohibition against cruel and unusual punishment. The justices refuse to grant certiorari. Case 2: A Mexican transsexual seeks asylum in the United States, due to social persecution of transsexuals in Mexico. The justices rule against the transsexual when it is discovered that the transsexual is actually a transvestite.
2	"Age of Consent"	Donald P. Bellisario	Larry Moskowitz	January 18, 2002	11.90
Case 1: A pregnant teenager gains permission from a court to obtain an abortion. Her parents oppose the abortion and appeal to the Supreme Court to overturn the decision. The justices rule in favor of the girl and the lower court. Case 2: The Supreme Court hears a case involving a school bully's hurtful comments and the school district's efforts to punish his speech. The justices rule the district's policies violate the bully's First Amendment right to freedom of speech.
3	"The Price of Liberty"	Alan J. Levi	Alfredo Barrios Jr.	January 25, 2002	10.50
Case 1: A masked witness testifies in a case against a drug dealer. The prosecution refuses to name the witness since three previous named witnesses in the case were killed although there is no evidence the defendant was involved in the killing. The defense appeals to the Supreme Court, and the justices rule that the defendant's Sixth Amendment right "to be confronted with the witnesses against him" was violated, so the witness must be named, or she will not be able to testify. Case 2: A dwarf lawyer accuses his law firm of discrimination because the firm installed a "mini-office" for him, claiming to be accommodating his disability. He claims the mini-office has resulted in his being treated differently, as if he were a sideshow. The lawyer also says his size is not a disability. The justices rule in favor of the law firm as the mini-office was a reasonable accommodation under the Americans with Disabilities Act.
4	"Crime and Punishment"	Brandford May	Lynnie Greene & Richard Levine	February 1, 2002	10.10
Case: A criminal with two previous felony convictions is sentenced to life in prison after committing a misdemeanor. The criminal claims that the state's three strikes law violates his Fourteenth Amendment right to due process, the 5th Amendment's prohibition against double jeopardy, the Eighth Amendment's prohibition against cruel and unusual punishment, and the Article I, Section 10 prohibition against states' making ex post facto laws. The justices rule against the criminal.
5	"Family Affairs"	James Whitmore Jr.	Randy Anderson	February 8, 2002	7.40
Case: A man with two wives convicted of bigamy appeals a lower court verdict, claiming anti-bigamy laws violate his First Amendment right to freedom of religion. The justices rule 4-4 (with Novelli abstaining after not being present to hear the arguments) against the man when one of the justices believes the man's religious beliefs do not actually support bigamy. (See Reynolds v. United States for a similar issue). Personal Issue for Justice Novelli: A reporter uncovers possible ties between the Novelli family and the Mafia.
6	"Dangerous Words"	Terrence O'Hara	Paul Levine	March 1, 2002	8.10
Case: The widow of a murdered abortion doctor wins a $6 million case against an extremist anti-abortion web site that advocated the killing of her husband and several other abortion doctors. The web site operator argues he is protected by his First Amendment right to freedom of speech. The justices overturn the verdict after finding that the site was not responsible for the murder and that the web site was indeed protected under the First Amendment. Personal Issue for Justice Novelli: The web site operator from the abortion case posts threatening pages targeting Justice Novelli. Beth Novelli finds a human fetus in her backpack.
7	"Right to Die"	Lou Antonio	Lawrence O'Donnell	March 8, 2002	6.60
Case: The wife and daughter of a man in a coma for nine years battle over whether he should be kept on life support. The wife wants to end life support, arguing her husband would not want to be kept alive in such a state. The daughter argues that she has seen glimpses of life in her father, so life support should be maintained. The justices rule 5–4 that the man's wife has the right to make medical decisions for him. The case foreshadowed the real-life Terri Schiavo controversy that would gain national attention in 2005. Personal Issue for Justice Novelli: Sarah Novelli sells a $2.2 million home to the head of an anti-smoking organization while a case regarding the cigarette industry is pending before the Supreme Court. When Justice Novelli tells his wife that he will have to recuse himself from the case due to conflict of interest rules, Sarah returns her commission and quits her job as a real estate agent.
8	"Court Date"	Bradford May	Randy Anderson	March 29, 2002	6.40
Case: A high school junior basketball star argues that the NBA's rule prohibiting high school age players from entering the NBA draft is a violation of antitrust laws. The justices rule 5–4 that the rule of reason applies, and the NBA can require the player to complete his high school education.
9	"Secrets and Lies"	Alan J. Levi	Story by : Donald P. Bellisario; Teleplay by : Lynnie Greene & Richard Levine	April 5, 2002	6.30
Case: A case is brought challenging the constitutionality of Megan's Law. The sex offenders argue that the law violates their Fourteenth Amendment right to due process. The advocates of the law argue that it protects public safety. The justices rule in favor of upholding the law. Personal Issue for Justice Szwark: Justice Novelli tells Justice Szwark that a sex offender is living in her neighborhood after he uses a Megan's Law database.
10	"Unprotected Speech"	Bradford May	Philip DeGuere	April 12, 2002	7.20
Case: A teenager digitally placed the faces of classmates on to the faces of adult pornographic film actors and is convicted under a federal law that prohibits simulated child pornography. The justices find a loophole that allows them to overturn the conviction without overturning the law, with the intention of sending a signal to Congress that the law was too broad and needed be narrowed. Personal Issue for Justice Snow: An audiotape surfaces of Justice Snow disparaging the other justices at a party.
11	"Strip Search"	Michael Zinberg	Alfredo Barrios Jr.	April 19, 2002	6.90
Case: The sheriff in a small town searching for a serial rapist begins collecting DNA samples from all the male patients of the town hospital. One person whose DNA is taken but does not match the rapist's DNA sues in a state court, which orders the sheriff to stop the DNA collection. After the sheriff ignores the state court's order, he finds a match. The accused rapist appeals to the Supreme Court. The justices rule 5–4 that the sheriff's collection of DNA was a violation of the Fourth Amendment's prohibition against "unreasonable searches and seizures" by government authorities. The rapist himself is convicted when his wife voluntarily turns over a sample of her husband's DNA. Personal Issue for Justice Novelli: Beth Novelli refuses to take a drug test required for her to participate in high school soccer, citing the unfairness of the school's policy of singling out athletes for drug testing. The media learn of the story and focus attention on the Novelli family. Justice Weisenberg cites Beth's refusal to take a drug test in deciding the DNA case.
12	"Showdown"	Alan J. Levi	Story by : Paul Levine & Randy Anderson; Teleplay by : Lynnie Greene & Richard Levine	April 22, 2002	9.10
Case: The Supreme Court must decide if a small town that bans guns within its borders is constitutional. The justices rule 5–4 that the ban violates the Second Amendment's protection of the right to bear arms. Personal Issue for Justice Novelli: Justice Snow informs his colleagues that Novelli owned a gun that was stolen and used in a drive-by shooting years ago.
13	"Family Secrets"	Bradford May	Story by : Donald P. Bellisario; Teleplay by : Larry Moskowitz	May 3, 2002	6.70
Case: The CIA attempts to stop the publication of a book that may reveal national security secrets. The author and the publisher argue that they are protected by the First Amendment's protection of freedom of the press. Personal Issue for Ellie Pearson: Ellie believes publication of the book will reveal how her father died. Personal Issue for Justice Szwark: As the justices sit down to hear oral argument in the case, Szwark storms off when she sees her daughter is the lawyer representing the CIA. She has her daughter brought to her chambers and speaks to her about the CIA's manipulation to force Justice Szwark to recuse herself since her daughter's representation of a litigant in the case constitutes a conflict of interest. The other eight justices later vote unanimously that Szwark has no conflict of interest. Cliffhanger ending: As Ellie and Justice Szwark's daughter walk to a restaurant, Szwark's daughter is struck by a car. Ellie cradles her and screams for help.

== Nomination ==
Bruce Broughton was nominated for a 2002 Emmy Award for Outstanding Main Title Theme Music.

== See also ==
- Supreme Court of the United States in fiction
