= Dr. Vegas =

American television series

- Genre: Medical drama
- Created by: John Herzfeld; Jack Orman
- Starring: Rob Lowe; Sarah Lancaster; Joe Pantoliano; Amy Adams; Tom Sizemore
- Composer: Blake Neely
- Country of origin: United States
- Original language: English
- No. of seasons: 1
- No. of episodes: 10 (5 unaired)

Production
- Executive producers: Jack Orman; Steve Pearlman; Lawrence Bender; Kevin Kelly Brown; Mark Sennet
- Producers: Jim Michaels; Rob Lowe
- Running time: 60 minutes
- Production companies: CBS Productions; Warner Bros. Television

Original release
- Network: CBS
- Release: September 24 – October 29, 2004

Dr. Vegas is an American medical drama television series created by John Herzfeld and Jack Orman, starring Rob Lowe and Joe Pantoliano that ran on CBS from September 24, 2004, to October 29, 2004, being canceled after five of the produced ten episodes aired. The complete series aired in Ireland on TG4, and on Challenge in the United Kingdom (as part of a rare departure from its all-quiz show format involving gaming-related fictional dramas and comedies).

The series co-starred Sarah Lancaster, Amy Adams, and Tom Sizemore. Chazz Palminteri filled in for Tom Sizemore when the actor re-entered rehab in 2004.

== Cast ==
- Rob Lowe as Dr. Billy Grant
- Sarah Lancaster as Veronica Harold
- Joe Pantoliano as Tommy Canterna
- Amy Adams as Alice Doherty
- Tom Sizemore as Vic Moore

== Production ==
Dr. Vegas began a three-week shoot on April 5, 2004, at the Green Valley Ranch hotel and casino in Henderson, Nevada. Other filming locations included a casino penthouse and the Las Vegas Hilton's sign. A second unit film crew shot additional scenes of Las Vegas in August 2004.

== Episodes ==
No.	Title	Directed by	Written by	Original release date	Prod. code
1	"Pilot"	David Nutter	Jack Orman and John Herzfeld	September 24, 2004	001
2	"Advantage Play"	Bryan Spicer	Jack Orman & Craig Sweeny	October 1, 2004	004
3	"Dead Man, Live Bet"	Alan J. Levi	Jack Orman & Jill Goldsmith	October 15, 2004	002
4	"All In"	Phil Sgriccia	Ira Steven Behr	October 22, 2004	003
5	"Limits"	Dennis Smith	Lance Gentile	October 29, 2004	005
6	"Lust for Life"	Oz Scott	Craig Sweeny	Unaired	007
7	"Out Damned Spot"	Craig Zisk	Andrew Orenstein & Ted Humphrey	Unaired	006
8	"Heal Thyself"	David Nutter	Jill Anderson	Unaired	008
9	"Babe in the Woods"	Joanna Kerns	Lance Gentile & Jill Goldsmith	Unaired	009
10	"For Love or Money"	Vincent Misiano	Ira Steven Behr	Unaired	010

== See also ==
- List of television shows set in Las Vegas
