= Blind Justice (1986 film) =

1986 American television film

- American VHS cover
- Genre: Drama
- Written by: Josephine Cummings; Richard Yalem
- Directed by: Rod Holcomb
- Starring: Tim Matheson; Mimi Kuzyk; Philip Charles MacKenzie
- Theme music composer: Miles Goodman
- Country of origin: United States
- Original language: English

Production
- Producer: Andrew Gottlieb
- Cinematography: Thomas Del Ruth
- Editor: George Hively
- Running time: 100 minutes
- Production company: CBS

Original release
- Network: CBS
- Release: March 9, 1986

Blind Justice is a 1986 American drama television film directed by Rod Holcomb and starring Tim Matheson, Mimi Kuzyk, and Philip Charles MacKenzie. It was written by Josephine Cummings and Richard Yalem. The film first aired on March 9, 1986 on CBS. The film is based on a true story.

== Background ==
The film stars Tim Matheson as Jim Anderson, Mimi Kuzyk as Cathy Anderson and Philip Charles MacKenzie as John Pierson. Others in the film include Lisa Eichhorn as Carolyn Shetland, Tom Atkins as Kramer and John Kellogg as Jim's father.

For years after the film's original broadcast, the film remained on out-of-print VHS only, released in America via Fox Home Entertainment. Another out-of-print version was released in Brazil via Abril Vídeo, whilst a now out-of-print VHS release via CBS/Fox Video Ltd was also released in the UK. In July 2012, the DVD was given a DVD release in America only via CBS Home Entertainment, which is now manufactured on demand using DVD-R recordable media via Amazon.com only.

== Plot ==
The average world of an average man turns upside down when he is arrested as the prime suspect in a series of rapes and robberies. In a gripping tale, professional photographer Jim Anderson (Tim Matheson) becomes trapped in a web of circumstantial evidence. After a zealous policeman arrests Anderson for indecent exposure for urinating during his morning run, he is soon fingered by witnesses as the criminal in relation to the rapes and robberies, despite his innocence. For the next 14 months, his life is hell. The case against him is so strong and his resemblance to the criminal is so exact, he begins to question his own innocence. Wrongly-accused and suffering the growing suspicions of his loyal wife (Mimi Kuzyk), Anderson begins to crack under the strain of clearing his name. He is forced to endure the ruthlessness of a police and legal system that becomes convinced that they have the right man. It also examines the personal impact that comes from such an assault. Too much circumstantial evidence surrounds the case, and too much information leaks out to the public; even if Anderson beats the rap, he'll be ruined in his community. Police Officer Kramer (Tom Atkins) is determined to bring him to justice, whilst Carolyn Shetland (Lisa Eichhorn) is Anderson's defense attorney.

== Cast ==
- Tim Matheson as Jim Anderson
- Mimi Kuzyk as Cathy Anderson
- Philip Charles MacKenzie as John Pierson
- Lisa Eichhorn as Carolyn Shetland
- Tom Atkins as Kramer
- John Kellogg as Jim's father
- David Froman as Pike
- Anne Haney as Jim's mother
- Linda Thorson as Pamela
- Marilyn Lightstone as Dr. Lathrop
- John M. Jackson as the Porter
- Jack Blessing as Larry
- Ann Ryerson as Leslie
- Sam Dalton as (uncredited role)
- Daniel Davis as Attorney Seth Thompson
- Tristan Hickey as Ray Carter

== Critical reception ==
Allmovie gave the film three out of five stars, writing "Blind Justice is a fact-based TV movie starring Tim Matheson, here made to look "normal" with glasses and mustache."
