= Jack Orman =

American television writer

- Born: Paradise Valley, Arizona, United States
- Occupations: Television writer, television producer
- Writing career
- Genre: Screenwriting
- Notable works: ER, Shades of Blue

Jack Orman is an American television writer, producer and director. He worked extensively on ER, eventually becoming an executive producer.

== Early life ==
Orman grew up in Paradise Valley, Arizona, and earned his bachelor's degree in communications (film) from Loyola Marymount University. He produced an international documentary in Asia before earning a master of fine arts degree from USC's Peter Stark Producing Program.

== Career ==
Orman made his script writing debut as a freelance writer for an episode of JAG. The script was so well-received that Orman was hired as a staff writer and within half a season Paramount Television made him a co-producer on the show. Orman contributed a further 8 episodes over the next year and a half.

Following his success on JAG, Orman was recruited to join the production team of ER in 1997. He became a writer and co-producer on the fourth season of ER. He was promoted to supervising producer for the fifth season and continued to write episodes. He became a co-executive producer for the sixth season. Orman then became an executive producer and the series show runner for the seventh season. He also made his television directing debut on the eighth season. Orman wrote 28 episodes and directed 3 episodes during his time on ER.

Orman and the rest of the producers of ER were nominated for an Emmy award for Outstanding Drama Series for their work on the fourth season at the 1998 awards. Orman was nominated for this award along with the other producers for the next three years running for the fifth, sixth and seventh seasons of ER. The show also received several people's choice awards throughout Orman's time as a producer. His season 6 episode "All in the Family" was the series highest rated episode to date and was second only to the Seinfeld finale for the most watched episode of television and was included in Hollywood Reporter's list of the Top 10 Highest Rated Shows of the Decade.

After leaving ER Orman has created/executive produced further television series. Dr. Vegas was a short-lived comedic drama starring Rob Lowe and Joe Pantoliano. Orman's next series, the Rhode Island–based Waterfront, also starred Pantoliano and was picked up by the CBS network in 2006.

In 2009, Orman wrote and produced on the first season of Men of a Certain Age which received a Peabody Award

He created a television pilot for ABC and Sony Pictures Television in 2010 called "Matadors" about the law, secret societies, and love.

And in 2011, Orman created and executive produced Pan Am (TV series) again with ABC and Sony Pictures Television.

Orman continues to be active in television development.

== Family life ==
He lives in Studio City, California, with his wife, Lisa, and their five children. He has three sons and twin daughters.

== Filmography ==
=== Writer ===
Year	Show	Episode	Notes
1995	JAG	"Pilot Error"	Season 1, episode 6
1996	JAG	"Hemlock"	Season 1, episode 15
1996	JAG	"Survivors"	Season 1, episode 18
1996	JAG	"Recovery"	Season 1, episode 19
1996	JAG	"Ares"	Season 1, episode 21
1997	JAG	"Jinx"	Season 2, episode 3
1997	JAG	"Trinity"	Season 2, episode 6
1997	JAG	"Full Engagement"	Season 2, episode 8
1997	JAG	"The Guardian"	Season 2, episode 12
1997	ER	"When the Bough Breaks"	Season 4, episode 4
1997	ER	"Do You See What I See? "	Teleplay - Season 4, episode 10
1998	ER	"My Brother's Keeper"	Season 4, episode 16
1998	ER	"Of Past Regret and Future Fear"	Season 4, episode 20
1998	ER	"Vanishing Act"	Season 5, episode 4
1998	ER	"The Good Fight"	Season 5, episode 9
1999	ER	"Responsible Parties "	Season 5, episode 21
1999	ER	"Last Rites"	Season 6, episode 2
1999	ER	"Great Expectations"	Season 6, episode 8
2000	ER	"All in the Family"	Season 6, episode 14
2000	ER	"May Day"	Season 6, episode 22
2000	ER	"Homecoming"	Season 7, episode 1
2000	ER	"Sand and Water "	Season 7, episode 2
2000	ER	"The Dance We Do"	Season 7, episode 8
2001	ER	"Surrender"	Season 7, episode 12
2001	ER	"The Crossing"	Season 7, episode 15
2001	ER	"Sailing Away"	Season 7, episode 19
2001	ER	"Rampage"	Season 7, episode 22
2001	ER	"Four Corners"	Season 8, episode 1
2001	ER	"The Longer You Stay"	Season 8, episode 2
2001	ER	"Partly Cloudy, Chance of Rain"	Season 8, episode 8
2002	ER	"Beyond Repair"	Season 8, episode 11
2002	ER	"A Simple Twist of Fate"	Season 8, episode 14
2002	ER	"The Letter"	Season 8, episode 20
2002	ER	"Chaos Theory"	Season 9, episode 1
2002	ER	"Insurrection"	Season 9, episode 3
2002	ER	"First Snowfall"	Season 9, episode 8
2003	ER	"When Night Meets Day"	Season 9, episode 21
2004	Dr. Vegas	"Pilot"	Season 1, episode 1
2006	Waterfront	"Pilot"	Season 1, episode 1
2009	Men of a Certain Age	"Go with the Flow"	Season 1, episode 6
2010	Matadors	"Pilot"	Season 1, episode 1
2011	Pan Am	"Pilot"	Season 1, episode 1
2011	Pan Am	"We'll Always Have Paris" (Co-written with Mike Daniels)	Season 1, episode 2
2011	Pan Am	"Eastern Exposure" (Co-written with Moira Walley-Beckett)	Season 1, episode 4
2011	Pan Am	"Truth or Dare" (Co-written with Mike Daniels)	Season 1, episode 7

=== Director ===
Year	Show	Episode	Notes
2002	ER	"The Letter"	Season 8, episode 20
2002	ER	"First Snowfall"	Season 9, episode 8
2003	ER	"When Night Meets Day"	Season 9, episode 21
