= Paul T. Gillcrist =

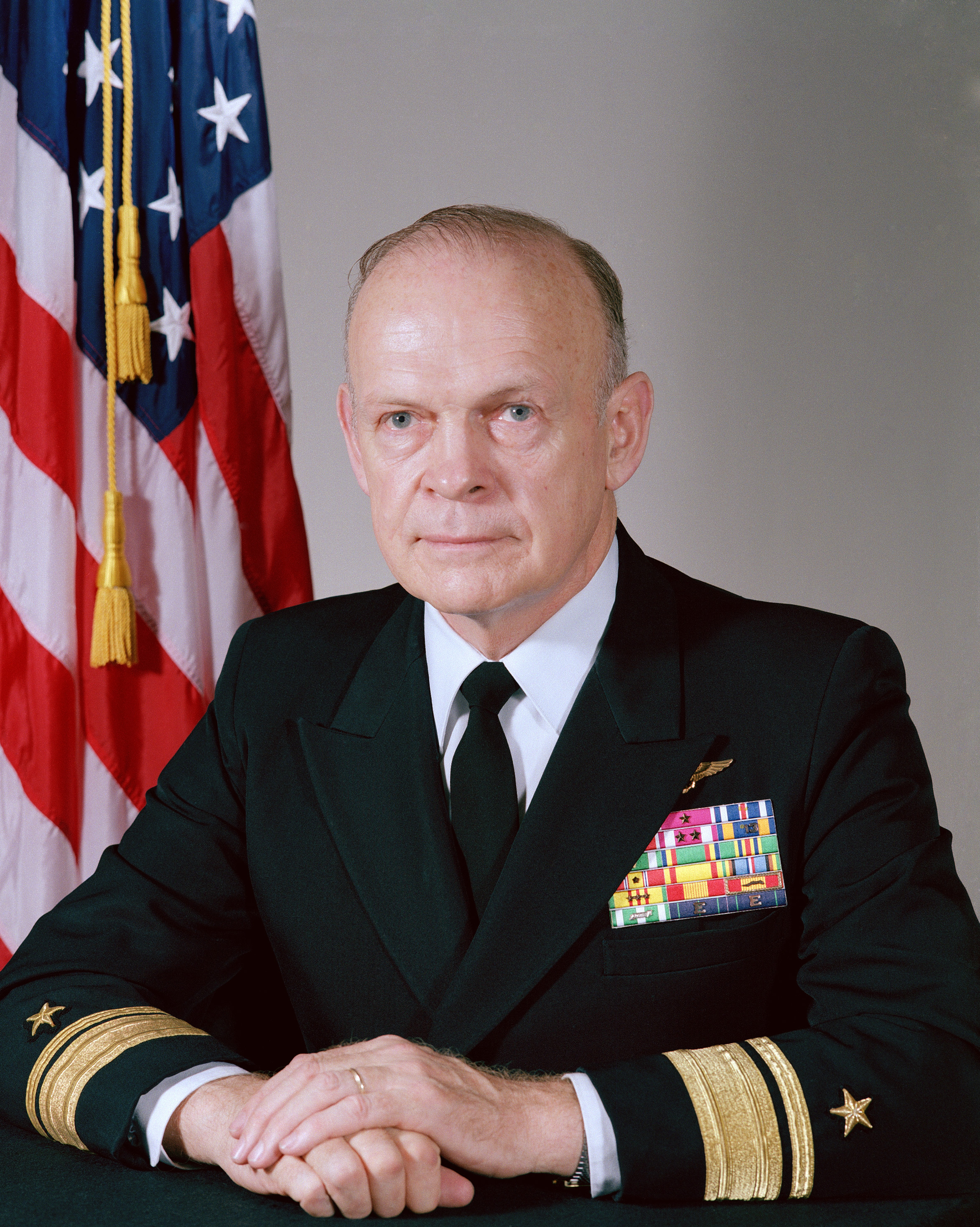
- Rear Adm. Gillcrist in 1985
- Born: March 22, 1929; Chicago, Illinois, U.S.
- Died: June 30, 2016 (aged 87)
- Military career
- Allegiance: United States
- Branch: United States Navy
- Service years: 1952–1985
- Rank: Rear Admiral
- Commands: Fighter Airborne Early Warning Wings of the U.S. Pacific Fleet

Paul Thomas Gillcrist (March 22, 1929 – June 30, 2016) was a rear admiral in the United States Navy. After retirement from the Navy, he wrote non-fiction and fiction books and was a consultant for television.

== Early life and education ==
Born in Chicago and raised in Freeport, Long Island, Gillcrist was a 1952 graduate of the United States Naval Academy. After attending flight school, he was designated a naval aviator in December 1953. Gillcrist was also an October 1958 graduate of the Naval Test Pilot School.

== Career ==
His first deployment was with the "Satan's Kittens" of VF-191 flying from the carrier Oriskany. Gillcrist later served with the "Boomerangs" of VF-62 flying from the carriers Shangri-La and Lexington. During the Vietnam War, he served three tours with the "Iron Angels" of VF-53 flying 167 combat missions from the carriers Ticonderoga, Hancock and Bon Homme Richard. Gillcrist was given command of the squadron from March 1967 to March 1968 during his last two deployments.

Gillcrist was a former Assistant Deputy Chief of Naval Operations for Air Warfare, a position he served from 1982 to 1985. Previously, he served as Commander, Naval Base San Diego, Assistant Chief of Staff for Operations for the Commander in Chief of the Atlantic Command, Commander of Carrier Air Wing THREE deployed on the carrier Saratoga, Commanding Officer of Naval Air Station Cecil Field, and as Commander of Fighter Airborne Early Warning Wings of the U.S. Pacific Fleet (COMFITAEWWING). He is an alumnus of Gonzaga University and the United States Naval Academy.

In 1981 at the age of 51, Gillcrist became the first flag officer to land an F-14 Tomcat on an aircraft carrier.

He wrote novels as well as books on aviation and naval science topics.

Following his retirement, he became a technical consultant for the movie Thirteen Days and the television show JAG. He died on June 30, 2016 and was interred at Miramar National Cemetery.

== Awards ==
His awards include the Distinguished Service Medal, Distinguished Flying Cross, Bronze Star, Air Medal (13), and the Republic of Vietnam Gallantry Cross. In 1985, he was named Tailhook Aviator of the Year by the Tailhook Association.

== Books ==
- Gillcrist, Paul T. Cobra. [Place of publication not identified]: [1st Books Library], 2000. ISBN 1588202836
- Gillcrist, Paul T. Crusader!: Last of the Gunfighters. Atglen, PA: Schiffer Pub, 1995. ISBN 0887407668
- Gillcrist, Paul T. Deadly Windfall: A Novel. Lincoln, NE: iUniverse, 2006. ISBN 9780595839650
- Gillcrist, Paul T. Feet Wet: Reflections of a Carrier Pilot. Novato, CA: Presidio Press, 1990. ISBN 0891413669
- Gillcrist, Paul T. Sea Legs. San Jose, CA: Writer's Showcase, presented by Writer's Digest, 2000. ISBN 0595145620
- Gillcrist, Dan, Robert Gillcrist, and Paul T. Gillcrist. Spindrift: Stories from the Sea Services. Atglen, PA: Schiffer Military/Aviation History, 1998. ISBN 0764305905
- Gillcrist, Paul T. Tomcat!: The Grumman F-14 Story. Atglen, PA: Schiffer Pub, 1994. ISBN 0887406645
