= Navy Office of Information West =

US Navy public relations office

- Website: www.navy.mil/Navinfowest//

The Navy Office of Information West, also referred to as NAVINFO West, is a public affairs office in Westwood, Los Angeles that serves as the primary Navy liaison to feature films, documentaries, and television programs depicting or involving the US Navy. The office was founded in 1918. This office also maintains close relations and contacts in the entertainment industry with the goal of telling the US military's story by facilitating accurate information and relevant themes and messages. In exchange for providing access and cooperation, Navy officials are shown early drafts of scripts.

Much like the rest of the U.S. military's 20-year involvement in Hollywood, the Navy is interested in entertainment projects that cast both itself and its sailors in a positive light, ending with the Navy's military justice prevailing. NAVINFO maintains that they do not censor film and TV projects that do not enhance the image of the Navy. The office is part of the Pentagon's role in actively controlling the popular image of national security shaped by the film and television products with which it is involved. In 2014 Captain Russell Coons, director of NAVINFO, stated, "We're not going to support a program that disgraces a uniform or presents us in a compromising way."
