= Paul Levine =

American author and attorney

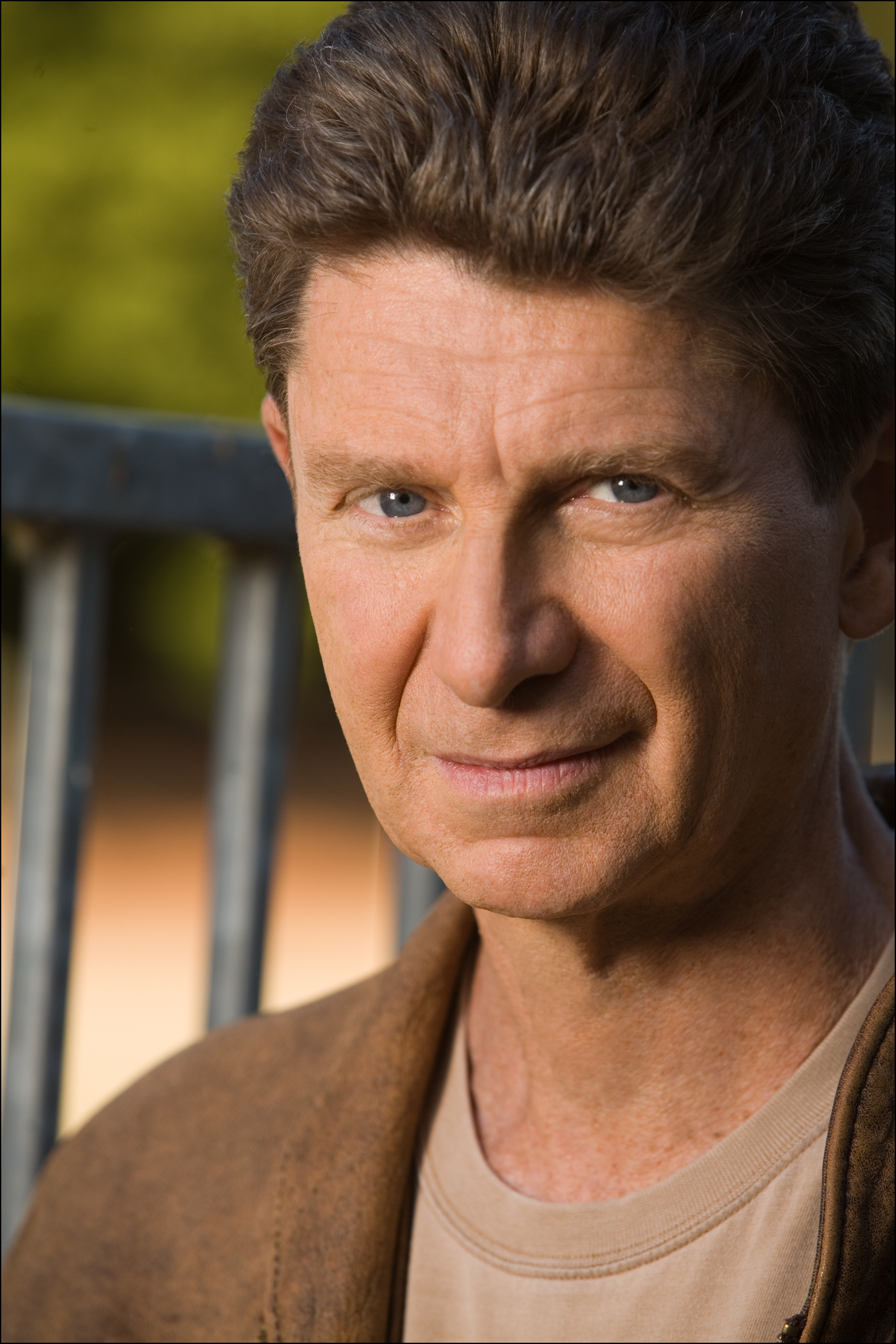
- Levine in 2008
- Born: January 9, 1948 (age 78); Williamsport, Pennsylvania, U.S.
- Education: Pennsylvania State University (BA); University of Miami School of Law (JD)
- Writing career
- Years active: 1990–present
- Genres: Teleplays and legal thrillers
- Notable works: Jake Lassiter series; Solomon vs. Lord series; JAG; Midnight Burning
- Notable awards: John D. MacDonald Award for Excellence in Florida Fiction
- Website: paul-levine.com

Paul J. Levine (born January 9, 1948) is an American author of crime fiction, particularly legal thrillers. Levine has written twenty-four mystery novels which include three series of books known by the names of the protagonists. The Jake Lassiter series follows the former football player turned Miami lawyer in a series of fifteen books beginning with To Speak for the Dead in 1990 and the latest, Early Grave, published in 2022. Levine's other two series of books are the four-book Solomon vs. Lord series published in the mid-2000s and a series which began with Midnight Burning (2025), based on the historical friendship between Albert Einstein and Charlie Chaplin.

Levine has also written four stand-alone novels and twenty episodes of the television drama series JAG. With JAG executive producer Don Bellisario, he also created and produced First Monday, a 2002 CBS series inspired by one of Levine's novels.

Born in Williamsport, Pennsylvania, Levine graduated from Pennsylvania State University and was a reporter for the Miami Herald early in his career. He then graduated from the University of Miami School of Law and was an attorney in Florida for 17 years before becoming an author.

== Early life and education ==
Paul J. Levine was born on January 9, 1948, in Williamsport, Pennsylvania, to Sally and Stanley Levine, both retail merchants. Stanley Levine served in World War II as a lieutenant in the United States Army Air Forces. A radar officer on a B-29, he was shot down over Japan during a bombing raid and, as a prisoner of war, was one of the first Americans to see the ruins of Hiroshima.

Paul Levine graduated in 1969 with a B.A. in journalism from Pennsylvania State University, where he was editor in chief of the newspaper The Daily Collegian. At the University of Miami School of Law, he was on the 1971 championship team at the National Moot Court Competition, contributed to the University of Miami Law Review, and graduated cum laude in 1973.

== Journalism and legal career ==
Levine began his career working for the Miami Herald in 1969 as a courthouse reporter, and writing for Tropic, the newspaper's Sunday magazine. As a law student, he worked part-time for The Miami News and the Los Angeles Times.

After graduating from law school, Levine was admitted to The Florida Bar in 1973. From 1978 to 1987, Levine was an attorney and partner at Morgan, Lewis & Bockius. He also worked, pro bono, for the Florida First Amendment Foundation. As an attorney for the foundation, he represented The Florida Star on appeal before Florida First District Court of Appeal after a rape victim won a $100,000 verdict against the newspaper for publishing her name. The Supreme Court of the United States overturned the verdict in 1989, holding that the imposition of damages for truthfully publishing public information violates the First Amendment. In 1987, he became counsel for the Miami law firm Spence, Payne, Masington, Grossman and Needle, which later became Grossman and Roth, both Miami law firms.

While practicing law, Levine also served as a legal commentator for WPLG-TV and WTVJ-TV in Miami and wrote and appeared on You & the Law, a television program syndicated by Newsweek Broadcasting. He taught communications law as an adjunct lecturer at the University of Miami School of Law. After 17 years as an attorney, Levine stopped practicing law to pursue a career as an author.

== Writing career ==
=== Early Jake Lassiter series ===
Levine published his first novel, To Speak for the Dead, with Bantam Books in 1990. In the first book of the Jake Lassiter series, the ex-linebacker turned attorney defends a surgeon in a malpractice lawsuit in a plot involving "kinky sex and murder for money." In January 1995, his debut book was made into a TV Movie produced by Stephen J. Cannell for NBC, Jake Lassiter: Justice on the Bayou, in which Lassiter is portrayed by Gerald McRaney. The character has been favorably compared to others in film and mystery writing. Lassiter was described by the Miami Herald as having "a lot more charisma than [Perry Mason] ever did." The Los Angeles Times described Lassiter as "Travis McGee with [a law degree]."

After gaining "some acclaim and modest success" with his first book, Levine's second book, Night Vision, was published in 1991. In this installment, Lassiter serves as special prosecutor on a serial murder case. This was followed by False Dawn (1993), in which Lassiter faces "a beautiful Finnish spy, Japanese art smugglers, CIA double agents, and Cuban exiles." Newgate Callendar in a New York Times review wrote that False Dawn's "plot is fairly complicated, but the story never gets lost, and Mr. Levine tells it in a realistic, gritty manner."

In 1994, Levine released the fourth book in the series, Mortal Sin, which Jean Heller in the St. Petersburg Times described as "the best", adding that the "escapade is populated with nicely drawn characters, new and used, and mayhem enough for anyone." In Mortal Sin, Lassiter becomes involved with his former lover whose fiancé he also represents in a murder trial.

Slashback in 1995 continued the series and marks a shift in the author's writing style, from first-person to third-person narration. This was followed, in 1996, by Fool Me Twice which has Lassiter accused of murder while he searches for a client that has gone missing. In Flesh and Bones (1997), Lassiter defends a woman who shot her father, claiming he abused her as a child.

=== 9 Scorpions and JAG ===
9 Scorpions (1998) was the first book by Levine not to include Lassiter. The protagonist, Lisa Freemont, is a young law clerk working for the newest appointee to the Supreme Court. Oline H. Cogdill wrote in the Sun-Sentinel that "9 Scorpions' plot relies too heavily on a series of coincidences and what-ifs that undermine the novel's realism" but it "is on firmest ground when Levine is showing us the inner workings of the Supreme Court, the collision of the Justices' personalities and beliefs and the law clerks' influence." Originally published by Pocket Books, Levine later re-released the book under a new title, Impact. In April 2026, ABA Journal named the book in a list of 10 best Supreme Court novels to read during the Supreme Court nomination of Merrick Garland.

In 1999, Levine moved to Los Angeles, California, to become a television writer. He was hired by executive producer Don Bellisario to join the writing staff of JAG, a military legal drama on CBS. Levine wrote 20 episodes of JAG. 9 Scorpions became the inspiration for First Monday, a 2002 CBS series Levine created and produced with Bellisario.

=== Solomon vs. Lord series ===
The 2005 novel Solomon vs. Lord started a new series of books for Levine and introduced bickering Miami lawyers Steve Solomon and Victoria Lord. In that first novel, the couple teams up to defend a wealthy widow accused of murdering her husband. The Chicago Sun-Times' review described the novel as "[r]emarkably fresh and original with characters you can't help loving and sparkling dialog that echoes the Hepburn–Tracy screwball comedies." Three more of Levine's legal capers featured the seemingly mismatched partners. In The Deep Blue Alibi (2006), they defend a client in a Key West murder trial which leads the couple to a nudist resort to investigate. In Kill All the Lawyers (2006), a former client of Solomon believes the lawyer sabotaged his case and comes back for revenge. In Trial and Error (2007), since re-titled Habeas Porpoise, Solomon and Lord find themselves on opposing sides of a case involving kidnapped dolphins when Lord is appointed as a special prosecutor.

=== Other novels ===
Levine's novel, Illegal (2009), featured Jimmy (Royal) Payne, a down-on-his-luck Los Angeles lawyer who is caught up in a human trafficking scheme. Calling the book a "riveting read," Booklist noted: "The portrait of the dangers and predations that Latinos face crossing the border is chilling and rings with authenticity." Levine's 2011 novel Ballistic takes on a new subject for the author where a doomsday religious cult occupies a nuclear missile silo and attempts to launch a missile targeting Jerusalem. In Paydirt (2012), Levine tells the story of a former lawyer who loses his career and decides to use his 12-year-old genius son to fix the outcome of the Super Bowl.

=== Later Jake Lassiter series ===
After a fourteen-year hiatus, Levine returned to the Jake Lassiter series in his 2011 novel Lassiter in which the main character is accused of being involved in the disappearance of a girl years earlier. The series continued with State vs. Lassiter (2013) in which Lassiter is charged with killing his lover, a banker, to allegedly cover up skimming from trust-fund accounts.

This was followed by three more novels, Bum Rap (2015), Bum Luck (2017), and Bum Deal (2018), that included characters from the Solomon vs. Lord series. In Bum Rap, Lassiter works with Lord to find a way to exonerate Solomon who has been charged with murdering a Russian club owner. In Bum Luck, Lassiter bizarrely threatens to kill his own client who has just been acquitted of murder. Solomon and Lord fear that Lassiter has suffered brain damage (chronic traumatic encephalopathy) from his days as a football player. Bum Luck also introduced Dr. Melissa Gold, the neuropathologist treating Lassiter, who later becomes his fiancée. In Bum Deal, Dr. Gold administers experimental brain treatments to Lassiter who has been appointed a special prosecutor to try a high-profile murder case arguing against Solomon and Lord. A review in Publishers Weekly lauded Bum Deal for its "fascinating, fully developed characters and smart, well-paced dialogue [that] keep the pages turning. Levine manipulates the expectations of the reader as skillfully as Jake manipulates the expectations of the jury."

In Cheater's Game (2020), Lassiter tackles a college admissions scandal, akin to the 2019 college admissions bribery scandal, when he defends his nephew who's been charged with taking students' College Board exams as an imposter. The novel concludes with a federal trial described by Booklist as "one seismic courtroom battle... an occasion for pyrotechnics that really blaze." In Early Grave (2022), the fifteenth book in the series, Lassiter sues a school and the Florida High School Athletic Association in an attempt to "abolish" high school tackle football after his godson suffers a catastrophic injury. Kirkus Reviews described the book "as believable as it is riveting." Early Grave, Solomon vs. Lord, and State vs. Lassiter were on a list of "Best Legal Thrillers of the 21st Century" by BestThrillers.com.

=== Einstein–Chaplin ===
With Midnight Burning (2025), Levine began a series featuring the historical friendship between Albert Einstein and Charlie Chaplin. The book imagines the real-life friends fighting to foil a fascist plot in 1930's Hollywood. In a review for Library Journal, Dan Forrest wrote that the book "will appeal to fans of historical mysteries, especially ones with real-life protagonists. Levine does an excellent job capturing the atmosphere of Golden Age Hollywood as well as the spirits of two of the most important figures of the era."

== Awards and honors ==
Levine was the recipient of the second John D. MacDonald Award for Excellence in Florida Fiction. Solomon vs. Lord was nominated for the "best novel" category of the Macavity Awards by Mystery Readers International and for the Thurber Prize for American Humor. The Deep Blue Alibi was nominated for an International Thriller Writers Award and the 2007 Edgar Award by the Mystery Writers of America. State vs. Lassiter was nominated for the Shamus Award from the Private Eye Writers of America.

He received the Distinguished Alumni Award from the Pennsylvania State University and the Alumni Achievement Award from the University of Miami School of Law.

== Personal life ==
Levine is married to Marcia Silvers, a criminal appellate attorney. They live in Santa Barbara, California. Levine has a daughter and a son from previous marriages.

== Books ==
Jake Lassiter series

- To Speak for the Dead (1990). Random House. ISBN 9780517109151.
- Night Vision (1991). Bantam Books. ISBN 9780553077964.
- False Dawn (1993). Bantam Books. ISBN 9780553089950.
- Mortal Sin (1994). William Morrow. ISBN 9780688127176.
- Slashback (1995). William Morrow. ISBN 9780380721627. Re-titled Riptide (2017). Nittany Valley Productions. ISBN 9780998316635.
- Fool Me Twice (1996). William Morrow. ISBN 9780688143046.
- Flesh and Bones (1997). William Morrow. ISBN 9780688143053.
- Lassiter (2011). Bantam Books. ISBN 9780553806748.
- Last Chance Lassiter (2012). Nittany Valley Productions. ISBN 9781494887322.
- State vs. Lassiter (2013). Nittany Valley Productions. ISBN 9781492184874.
- Bum Rap (2015). Thomas & Mercer. ISBN 9781477829868.
- Bum Luck (2017). Thomas & Mercer. ISBN 9781477823101.
- Bum Deal (2018). Thomas & Mercer. ISBN 9781503951716.
- Cheater's Game (2020). Herald Square. ISBN 9781734251005.
- Early Grave (2022). Herald Square. ISBN 9781734505696.

Solomon vs. Lord series

- Solomon vs. Lord (2005). Bantam Books. ISBN 9780440242734.
- The Deep Blue Alibi (2006). Bantam Books. ISBN 9780440242741.
- Kill All the Lawyers (2006). Bantam Books. ISBN 9780440242758.
- Trial & Error (2007). Bantam Books. ISBN 9780440242765. Re-titled Habeas Porpoise (2013). ISBN 9781494445959.

Others

- 9 Scorpions (1998). Pocket Books. ISBN 9780671019396. Re-titled Impact.
- Illegal (2009). Bantam Books. ISBN 9780553591057.
- Ballistic (2011). Nittany Valley Productions. ISBN 9780982811368.
- Paydirt (2012). CreateSpace. ISBN 9781468106039.
- Midnight Burning (2025). Blank Slate Press. ISBN 9781943075966.

Short story anthology

- The Road to Hell (2010). Smashwords. ISBN 9781458082060.
