= Joe Napolitano =

American television director (1948–2016)

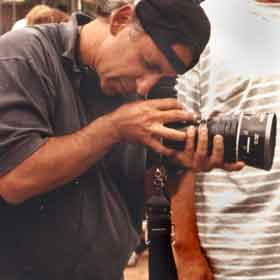
- Napolitano directing an episode of Quantum Leap in 1991
- Born: Joseph Ralph Napolitano; November 22, 1948; Brooklyn, New York, U.S.
- Died: July 23, 2016 (aged 67); Los Angeles, California, U.S.
- Other name: J. R. Napolitano
- Occupation: Television director
- Years active: 1974–2016

Joseph Ralph Napolitano (November 22, 1948 – July 23, 2016) was an American television director who worked on multiple episodic series. He previously was a film assistant director.

== Career ==
Napolitano's television credits include directing twelve episodes of Quantum Leap, two episodes of The X-Files, two episodes of Picket Fences, three episodes of The Pretender, two episodes of L.A. Doctors, two episodes of Dawson's Creek, four episodes of Boston Public, and fourteen episodes of Strong Medicine, as well as the 1991 TV film Earth Angel. The TV film Contagious earned an American Latino Media Arts Award for actress Elizabeth Peña for 'Outstanding Actress in a Made-for-Television Movie or Mini-Series'.

In the 1980s, Napolitano's work included acting as assistant director on feature film projects, working on films with directors Brian Hutton, Danny DeVito, Stuart Rosenberg, Donald P. Bellisario, Ron Howard, Howard Zieff, Terry Gilliam, Antoine Fuqua, and on multiple projects directed by Brian De Palma.

== Filmography ==
=== As director ===
==== Television ====
- The Big Blue Marble (unknown episodes)
- Earth Angel (1991) (TV film)
- Reasonable Doubts (1 episode, 1991)
- I'll Fly Away (1 episode, 1992)
- Quantum Leap (12 episodes, 1990–1992)
- Covington Cross (1 episode, 1992)
- Going to Extremes (1 episode, 1992)
- Northern Exposure (1 episode, 1993)
- Class of '96 (1 episode, 1993)
- SeaQuest 2032 (1 episode, 1993)
- The Adventures of Brisco County, Jr. (1 episode, 1993)
- The X-Files (2 episodes, 1993–1994)
- M.A.N.T.I.S. (1 episode, 1994)
- Medicine Ball (1995)
- Earth 2 (3 episodes, 1994–1995)
- Chicago Hope (1 episode, 1995)
- Picket Fences (2 episodes, 1995–1996)
- Murder One (1 episode, 1996)
- Viper (1 episode, 1996)
- Contagious (1997) (TV film)
- The Practice (1 episode, 1997)
- JAG (4 episodes, 1995–1997)
- Ally McBeal (1 episode, 1997)
- Hotel del Sol (1998)
- The Pretender (3 episodes, 1997–1998)
- Mercy Point (1998)
- Wasteland (1 episode, 1999)
- L.A. Doctors (2 episodes, 1999)
- Cold Feet (1999)
- Martial Law (1 episode, 1999)
- Snoops (1 episode, 1999)
- Dawson's Creek (2 episodes, 1998–2000)
- The Huntress (2000)
- FreakyLinks (1 episode, 2001)
- Kate Brasher (2001)
- For the People (2002)
- Birds of Prey (1 episode, 2003)
- Boston Public (4 episodes, 2001–2003)
- The District (1 episode, 2003)
- Strong Medicine (14 episodes, 2000–2006)
- Bones (1 episode, 2006)
- Runaway (1 episode, 2006)
- Cashmere Mafia (1 episode, 2008)

==== Video games ====
- Zork: Nemesis (1996)

=== As first assistant director ===
==== Film ====
- The First Deadly Sin (1980) – Director: Brian Hutton
- Blow Out (1981) – Director: Brian De Palma
- Scarface (1983) – Director: Brian De Palma
- The Pope of Greenwich Village (1984) – Director: Stuart Rosenberg
- Body Double (1984) – Director: Brian De Palma
- Wise Guys (1986) – Director: Brian De Palma
- The Untouchables (1987) – Director: Brian De Palma
- Throw Momma from the Train (1987) – Director: Danny DeVito
- Last Rites (1988) Also as second unit director – Director: Donald P. Bellisario
- Parenthood (1989) – Director: Ron Howard
- The Dream Team (1989) – Director: Howard Zieff
- The Fisher King (1991) – Director: Terry Gilliam
- Brooklyn's Finest (2008) Also co-producer – Director: Antoine Fuqua
