= Karri Turner =

American actress

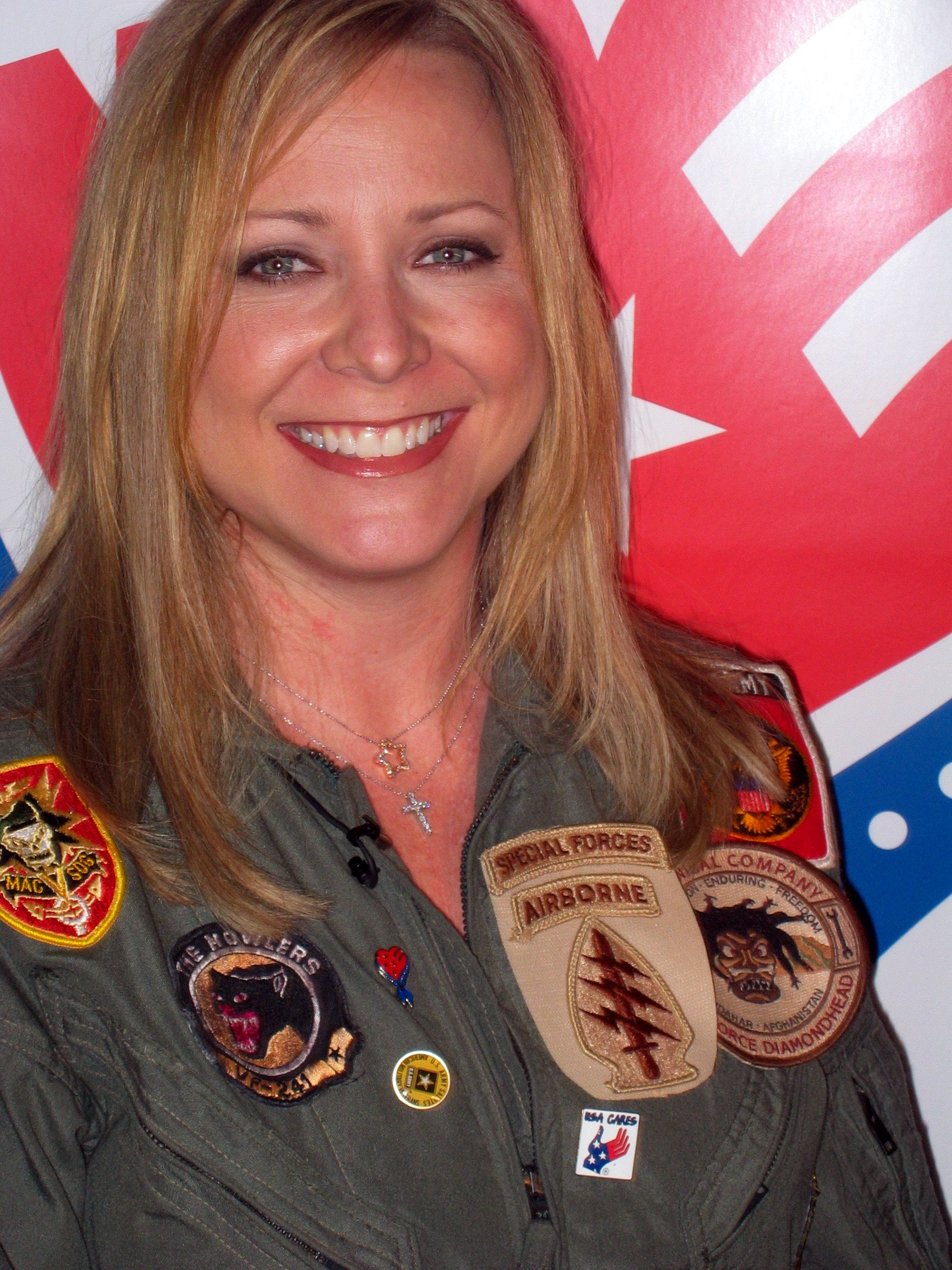
- Turner at the American Freedom Festival
- Occupation: Actress
- Years active: 1994–present

Karri Turner is an American television actress who is best known for playing Lieutenant Harriet Sims in the television series JAG (1997–2005).

== Biography ==
Her recent film credits include Get Smart and An American Carol. She has had extensive stage experience in such plays as Godspell and Charley's Aunt, and appeared in 2003 as Susan in the award-winning comic short The Date. She has also had recurring roles in Caroline in the City, The X-Files and South Park.

She accompanied comedians Kathy Griffin and Michael McDonald to Iraq to perform for troops serving for the United States stationed there, a performance broadcast as part of Griffin's series My Life on the D-List and has completed 13 USO tours as of 2012, as well as work for other groups such as the young challenge program Nation Guard, American Freedom Foundation and five tours with Stars for Stripes.

In January 2020 it was revealed that Turner would return to her acting career with an appearance in the NCIS episode "In the Wind", as "Micki Kaydar".

== Partial filmography ==
=== Film ===
Year	Title	Role	Notes
1997	Who's the Caboose?	Wendi	
2008	Get Smart	Mom in Minivan	
2008	An American Carol	Lab Tech 2	
2009	Hurricane in the Rose Garden	Ashley	

=== Television ===
==== Live-action ====
Year	Title	Role	Notes
1994	Wild Oats	Tanya Kavasi	2 episodes
1997	Suddenly Susan	Marcy	Episode: "Love and Divorce American Style: Part 2"
1996–1997	Caroline in the City	Honey Potts	2 episodes
1997	The X-Files	Tara Scully	2 episodes
1997–2005	JAG	Lt. Harriet Sims	Recurring role, 112 episodes
2006	Heroes	Lisa	2 episodes
2020–2021	NCIS	Micki Kaydar	2 episodes

==== Animated ====
Year	Title	Role	Notes
1996	South Park	Wendy Testaburger / Liane Cartman / Veronica Crabtree	Episode: "Unaired pilot"
1997	South Park	Kathie Lee Gifford	Episode: "Weight Gain 4000"

=== Video game ===
Year	Title	Role
1996	Soviet Strike	Delilah (voice)
