= John M. Jackson =

American actor (born 1950)

- Born: John Murice Jackson; June 1, 1950 (age 76); Baton Rouge, Louisiana, United States
- Years active: 1981–present
- Spouse: Jana Gale Hawkins (m. 1979)
- Children: 2 (including Conor)

John Murice Jackson (born June 1, 1950) is an American actor, who played Rear Admiral A. J. Chegwidden on the CBS series JAG and was also a special guest star on the spin-off NCIS, and recurring cast to its spin-off NCIS: Los Angeles.

Jackson uses his middle initial "M." for his professional name because there was already a "John Jackson" registered with the Screen Actors Guild when he joined the union and SAG rules prohibit two or more members from using exactly the same name.

== Early life ==
Jackson was born in Baton Rouge, Louisiana, and raised in Fort Worth, Texas. He played football and basketball at Arlington Heights High School in Fort Worth, graduating in 1968. A severe injury permanently sidelined his football career at the University of Texas without him ever lettering. After graduating from the University of Texas at Austin, Jackson taught social studies at LBJ High School in Austin, Texas.

== Career ==
Jackson started acting in his late 20s, at a community theater. In 1980, Jackson went to New York City, and later to Hollywood, to further his acting career. He had small roles in a number of television and motion picture productions, most notably a recurring role in the series Wiseguy. In 1986, he appeared in the TV film Blind Justice, starring Tim Matheson. In 1987, Jackson had a small role in the MacGyver episode "Birth Day" as LA police sergeant Meechum who recognizes MacGyver's flag help signal, saying he does so because he spent four years in the Navy. In 1992, Jackson played Captain West, a senior JAG officer, in the American drama film A Few Good Men.

In 1996, Jackson took on the role of Rear Admiral A. J. Chegwidden (the Judge Advocate General of the Navy) in JAG, which he would continue to play for eight consecutive years. Jackson was Johnny B./Eli Ferguson in The Spitfire Grill. His mother was played by Ellen Burstyn.

Jackson had a recurring role as FBI Deputy Director Sam Cullen in the first season of Fox series Bones. Jackson appeared in the series finale of Jericho as the ambassador of Texas to the Allied States of America. Jackson portrayed C-130 pilot Gus in the NBC series Knight Rider and has recently appeared on CSI: Crime Scene Investigation.

Jackson returned to the role of retired admiral A.J. Chegwidden, now a civilian lawyer, in the NCIS season 10 finale, broadcast on May 14, 2013 and again as a recurring character on NCIS: Los Angeles in its 8th and 9th seasons.

== Personal life ==
Jackson is married to Jana Gale Hawkins Jackson. They have a son, former Major League Baseball player Conor Jackson, and a daughter.

== Filmography ==
=== Film ===
Year	Title	Role	Notes
1981	Back Roads	Merle	Credited as John Jackson
1983	Local Hero	Cal	Credited as John Jackson
1985	The Legend of Billie Jean	Kenny's Father	Credited as John Jackson
1986	The Hitcher	Sergeant Starr	Credited as John Jackson
1986	Sid and Nancy	Lance Boyles, M.D.	Credited as John Jackson
1989	Ginger Ale Afternoon	Hank Mickers	
1990	Chinatown Connection	P.C. Pete	
1991	Eve of Destruction	Peter Arnold	
1991	Career Opportunities	Bud Dodge	
1992	A Few Good Men	Captain West	
1993	A Perfect World	Bob Fielder	
1994	Roswell	Colonel Blanchard	
1996	The Spitfire Grill	Johnny B. / Eli	
1996	The Glimmer Man	Donald Cunningham	
1998	Edge City	Gary	
2005	Homefront	Marvin	Short film
2008	West of Brooklyn	Mr. Jensen	
2017	Gifted	Judge Edward Nichols	

=== Television ===
Year	Title	Role	Notes
1981	Murder in Texas	Waiter	Television movie
1982	American Playhouse	Mr Goodman	Episode "Seguin"
1983	Adam	Det. Jim Gibbons	Television film
1984	License to Kill	Officer Caskey	Television film
1984	Celebrity	Detective	miniseries
1985	Not My Kid	Parent	Television film
1985	Right to Kill?	Social worker	Television film
1985	Crime of Innocence	Police Officer	Television film
1986	Blind Justice	Porter	Television film
1986	Kate's Secret	Dick	Television film
1987	Stillwatch		Television film
1987	Roses Are for the Rich	Dr. Clyde Andrews	Television film
1987	In Self Defense	Pete	Television film
1987	Baby Girl Scott	David	Television film
1987	Eye on the Sparrow	Marcus (as John Jackson)	Television film
1987	Beauty and the Beast	Laine Keller	Episode: "An Impossible Silence"
1987	MacGyver	LAPD Sergeant Meechum	Episode "Birth Day"
1988	Baja Oklahoma	Lee Steadman	Television film
1988	Probe	Sgt. Greenwald	Episode: "Metamorphic Anthropoidic Prototype Over You"
1988	The Town Bully	Cliff Clifford (as John Jackson)	Television film
1988	Go Toward the Light	Dr. Paxton	Television film
1988	Dead Solid Perfect	Grover Scomer	Television film
1987-1989	Wiseguy	Daryl Elias	7 episodes
1989	Traveling Man	Joe Blagdon	Television film
1989	CBS Summer Playhouse	Mr. Bergen	Episode: "Elysian Fields"
1989	Cold Sassy Tree	Hoyt (as John Jackson)	Television film
1989	When He's Not a Stranger	Woodward University Coach (as John Jackson)	Television film
1989	Parent Trap: Hawaiian Honeymoon	Ray	Television film
1990	Family of Spies	Arthur J. Walker	Episode #1.1 and #1.2
1990	Sudie and Simpson	Dr. Walter Stubbs (as John Jackson)	Television film
1991	Line of Fire: The Morris Dees Story	Curtis	Television film
1991	Love, Lies and Murder	Sergeant Patterson	Episode #1.1; Episode #1.2
1991	Switched at Birth	Ernest Twigg	miniseries
1991	Shannon's Deal		Episode: "Trouble"
1991	My Life and Times	Frank Harper	Episode: "The Collapse of '98"
1992	Northern Exposure	Larry Coe (Bob)	Episode: "Burning Down the House"
1992	A Thousand Heroes	Lt. Colonel Dennis Nielsen	Television film
1992	An American Story	Sheriff McMillan	Television movie
1992	Deadly Matrimony	Chief Michael Corbitt	Television film
1993	Black Widow Murders: The Blanche Taylor Moore Story	Raymond Reid	Television film
1993	The American Clock	Brewster (as John Jackson)	Television film
1993	A Family Torn Apart	Joe Hannigan	Television film
1993	Boy Meets Girl	Percy	Television film
1994	Dead Man's Revenge	Beesly	Television film
1994	On Promised Land	Albert Appletree	Television film
1994	Roswell	Colonel Blanchard	Television film
1994	Without Warning	Dale Powell (uncredited)	Television film
1995	The Watcher	Big Mike Jackson	2 episodes
1995	Kansas	Harvey Purvis	Television film
1995	Sisters	Det. Blake	Episode: "A Tough Act to Follow"
1996	Forgotten Sins	Wayne Everett	Television film
1996	Dark Skies	Charles Pratt	Episode: "The Awakening (Pilot)"
1995–1997	Party of Five	Major Chase W. Holbrook	2 episodes
1996–2004	JAG	Rear Admiral A. J. Chegwidden, JAGC, USN	186 episodes, including season 8 episodes Ice Queen and Meltdown, backdoor pilots for NCIS
1998	From the Earth to the Moon	Hal Deacon	Television miniseries Episode: "We Interrupt This Program"
1999	JAG	Chief Petty Officer Burns	Episode: "Ghosts of Christmas Past"
2003	JAG	Captain Chesborough	Episodes: "Each of Us Angels"
2005	Ghost Whisperer	Miles Jensen	Episode: "Voices"
2005–2006	Bones	FBI Deputy Director Sam Cullen	6 episodes
2008	Without a Trace	Quentin Richards	Episode: "Article 32"
2009	Knight Rider	Gus	Episode: "Day turns into Knight"
2010	CSI: Crime Scene Investigation	Russell Huntley	Episode: "Long Ball"
2011	Castle	Rod Halstead	Episode: "Rise"
2013	Criminal Minds	Agent Malcolm Hollins	Episode: "Final Shot"
2013	NCIS	Rear Admiral A. J. Chegwidden, JAGC, USN (Ret)	Episode: "Damned If You Do"
2014	Rizzoli & Isles	Howard Ames	Episode: "It Takes a Village"
2017–2018	NCIS: Los Angeles	Rear Admiral A. J. Chegwidden, JAGC, USN (Ret)	6 episodes
