= Alan J. Levi =

American film director

- Born: St. Louis, Missouri
- Occupations: Director, producer, writer
- Years active: 1960–present
- Spouse: Sondra Currie (1989–present)

Alan J. Levi is an American film, television director, television producer and writer.

== Career ==
Levi, who was born in St Louis, Missouri, has worked in television since the 1960s. He has amassed a number of notable credits, beginning his career as a writer on the television series National Velvet. He eventually made his directorial debut on the Rowan & Martin's Laugh-In spin-off Letters to Laugh-In.

His notable television credits include Columbo, The Invisible Man, Gemini Man, The Six Million Dollar Man, The Bionic Woman, Battlestar Galactica, The Incredible Hulk, Simon & Simon, Airwolf, Miami Vice, Magnum, P.I., Quantum Leap, Lois & Clark: The New Adventures of Superman, Dr. Quinn, Medicine Woman, JAG, ER, NCIS and NCIS: Los Angeles.

In 1982, Levi co-directed the feature film Blood Song. He also directed a number of television films.

== Personal life ==
Levi is married to actress Sondra Currie.

== Filmography ==
=== Film ===
- The Last Song (1980)
- Blood Song (1982)
- The Invisible Woman (1983)
- The Stepford Children (1987)

=== Television ===
- The Invisible Man (1975-1976)
- Gemini Man (1976)
- Judgment Day (1981)
