= List of Linda Cardellini performances =

Linda Cardellini filmography

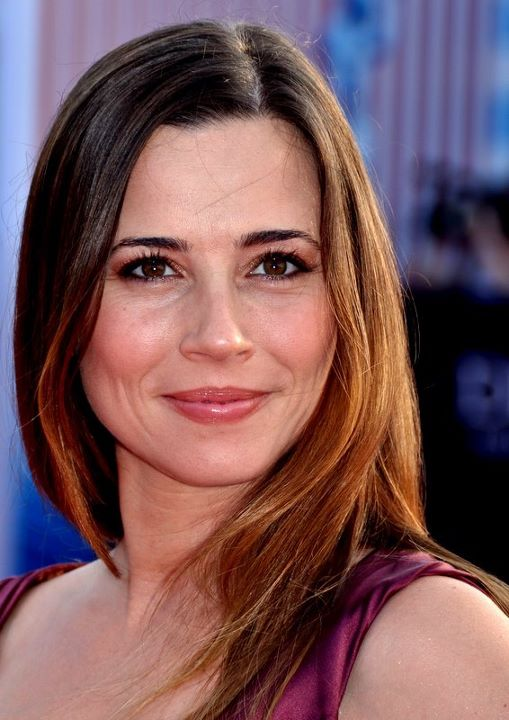
Cardellini at the 2011 Deauville American Film Festival

Linda Cardellini is an American actress known for her leading roles in television, such as the teen drama Freaks and Geeks (1999–2000), the medical drama ER (2003–2009), the drama thriller Bloodline (2015–2017), and the black tragicomedy Dead to Me (2019–2022), the latter of which earned her a nomination for the Primetime Emmy Award for Outstanding Lead Actress in a Comedy Series. She also guest starred in the period drama Mad Men (2013–2015), for which she gained a Primetime Emmy Award nomination. Cardellini provided her voice for the animated series Scooby-Doo! Mystery Incorporated (2010–2013), Regular Show (2012–2015), Gravity Falls (2012–2016), and Sanjay and Craig (2013–2016). In 2026, Cardellini starred in DTF: St. Louis, for which she earned a Primetime Emmy Award for Outstanding Supporting Actress in a Limited or Anthology Series.

Cardellini portrayed Velma Dinkley in the live action films Scooby-Doo (2002) and its sequel Scooby-Doo 2: Monsters Unleashed (2004), and has appeared in the Marvel Cinematic Universe as Laura Barton in the films Avengers: Age of Ultron (2015) and Avengers: Endgame (2019), and the Disney+ series Hawkeye (2021), and as Lylla in Guardians of the Galaxy Vol. 3 (2023). Other film appearances include Legally Blonde (2001), Brokeback Mountain (2005), Daddy's Home (2015), Daddy's Home 2 (2017), Green Book (2018), and The Curse of La Llorona (2019). Cardellini's work in the drama film Return (2011) earned her an Independent Spirit Award for Best Female Lead nomination.

== Film ==
Year	Title	Role	Notes	Ref.
1997	Good Burger	Heather		
1998	Dead Man on Campus	Kelly		
1998	Strangeland	Genevieve Gage		
1999	The Prince and the Surfer	Melissa	Direct to-video film	
2001	Legally Blonde	Chutney Windham		
2001	The Unsaid	Shelly Hunter		
2002	Scooby-Doo	Velma Dinkley		
2003	Certainly Not a Fairytale	Adelle / Writer	Short film	
2004	Scooby-Doo 2: Monsters Unleashed	Velma Dinkley		
2004	Jiminy Glick in Lalawood	Natalie Coolidge		
2004	LolliLove	Linda		
2005	Brokeback Mountain	Cassie Cartwright		
2005	American Gun	Mary Ann Wilk		
2006	Grandma's Boy	Samantha		
2008	The Lazarus Project	Julie Ingram		
2010	Super	Pet Store Employee		
2010	Gleeclipse	Coach	Short film	
2011	Kill the Irishman	Joan Madigan		
2011	All-Star Superman	Nasthalthia Luthor	Voice role; direct-to-video film	
2011	Return	Kelli		
2014	Welcome to Me	Gina Selway		
2015	Avengers: Age of Ultron	Laura Barton		
2015	Daddy's Home	Sara Whitaker		
2016	The Founder	Joan Smith		
2017	Austin Found	Leanne Wilson		
2017	Daddy's Home 2	Sara Whitaker		
2018	Green Book	Dolores Vallelonga		
2018	A Simple Favor	Diana Hyland		
2018	Hunter Killer	Jayne Norquist		
2019	The Curse of La Llorona	Anna Tate-Garcia		
2019	Avengers: Endgame	Laura Barton		
2020	Capone	Mae Capone		
2023	Guardians of the Galaxy Vol. 3	Lylla	Voice and motion-capture	
2024	Nutcrackers	Gretchen Rice		
2025	Nonnas	Olivia		
2026	Way of the Warrior Kid	Sarah	Post-production	
TBA	They Know	TBA	Post-production	

== Television ==
Year	Title	Role	Notes	Ref.
1996	Bone Chillers	Sarah	Main role; 12 episodes	
1997	3rd Rock from the Sun	Lorna	Episode: "Dickmalion"	
1997	Pacific Palisades	Sara	Episodes: "Desperate Measure" and "Sweet Revenge"	
1997	Clueless	Oddrey	Episode: "Chick Fight Tonight"	
1997	Step by Step	Cassie Evans	Episode: "Girls Just Wanna Have Fun"	
1998	Promised Land	Amber	Episode: "Chasin' the Blues"	
1998	Kenan & Kel	Becky	Episode: "Chicago Witch Trials"	
1998–1999	Guys Like Us	Jude	Recurring role; 7 episodes	
1998–1999	Boy Meets World	Lauren	Recurring role; 3 episodes (seasons 5–6)	
1999	The Lot	June Parker	Main role (season 1), Recurring role (season 2); 7 episodes	
1999	Dying to Live	Leslie Dugger	Television film	
1999–2000	Freaks and Geeks	Lindsay Weir	Main role; 18 episodes	
2003	The Twilight Zone	Ali Warner	Episode: "The Path"	
2003–2009	ER	Samantha "Sam" Taggart	Main role; 124 episodes (seasons 10–15)	
2005–2022	Robot Chicken	Velma Dinkley, various voices	Voice role; 6 episodes	
2007	Human Giant	Melody Richards	Episode: "Mind Explosion"	
2008	Comanche Moon	Clara Forsythe	Miniseries; 3 episodes	
2009	Cupid	Masseuse	Episode: "My Fair Masseuse" (uncredited)	
2009	The Goode Family	Bliss Goode / Shelly	Voice role; 13 episodes	
2011	Person of Interest	Dr. Megan Tillman	Episode: "Cura Te Ipsum"	
2011–2013	Scooby-Doo! Mystery Incorporated	Marcy 'Hot Dog Water' Fleach, Lilith	Voice role; 8 episodes	
2012–2015	Regular Show	CJ, various voices	Voice role; 24 episodes	
2012–2016	Gravity Falls	Wendy Corduroy	Voice role; 31 episodes	
2013	Out There	Sharla Lemoyne	Voice role; 5 episodes	
2013–2015	Mad Men	Sylvia Rosen	Recurring role; 9 episodes (seasons 6–7)	
2013–2016	Sanjay and Craig	Megan Sparkles, various voices	Voice role; 46 episodes	
2014	New Girl	Abby Day	Recurring role; 3 episodes (season 3)	
2015–2017	Bloodline	Meg Rayburn	Main role; 30 episodes	
2019–2022	Dead to Me	Judy Hale	Main role; 30 episodes (also executive producer)	
2020	Muppets Now	Herself	Miniseries; 6 episodes	
2021	Hawkeye	Laura Barton	Miniseries; 5 episodes	
2024	Creature Commandos	Elizabeth Bates	Voice role; Episode: "Chasing Squirrels"	
2024	No Good Deed	Margo Starling	Main role; 8 episodes	
2025	Robot Chicken: Self Discovery Special	Velma Dinkley	Voice role; television special	
2026	DTF St. Louis	Carol Love-Smernitch	Miniseries; 7 episodes	
2026	Regular Show: The Lost Tapes	CJ	Voice role; Episode: "Stilt Walkers"	
2026	Crystal Lake	Pamela Voorhees	Main role; 8 episodes	

== Video games ==
Year	Title	Voice role	Ref.
2003	Gladius	Ursula	
2004	Scooby-Doo 2: Monsters Unleashed – The Video Game	Velma Dinkley	
2012	Lollipop Chainsaw	Cordelia Starling	

== Music videos ==
Year	Title	Artist(s)	Role	Notes	Ref.
2004	"Don't Wanna Think About You"	Simple Plan	Velma Dinkley	Cameo	
2008	"Sing Along"	Virginia Coalition	—N/a		
