= Bill Hader filmography =

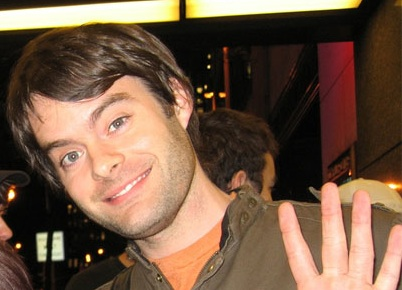
- Hader in 2007
- Film: 51
- Television series: 14
- Others: 2 video games

Bill Hader is an American actor, comedian, producer, voice actor, writer, and director. The following are his appearances in film, television and video games.

== Film ==
Year	Title	Role	Notes
2005	Jenny Clone	Father	Voice; short film; also producer
2006	You, Me and Dupree	Mark	
2006	Doogal	Sam the Soldier	Voice
2006	The Pity Card	Eric	Short film
2007	Knocked Up	Brent	
2007	Hot Rod	Dave	
2007	Superbad	Officer Slater	
2007	The Brothers Solomon	Recumbent Biker	
2007	Purple Violets	Bookstore Fan	Uncredited
2008	Pineapple Express	Private Greg B. Miller	
2008	Tropic Thunder	Rob Slolom	
2008	Forgetting Sarah Marshall	Brian Bretter	
2009	Adventureland	Bobby	
2009	Night at the Museum: Battle of the Smithsonian	George Armstrong Custer	
2009	Year One	The Shaman	
2009	Ice Age: Dawn of the Dinosaurs	Gazelle	Voice cameo
2009	Cloudy with a Chance of Meatballs	Flint Lockwood	Voice
2010	Scott Pilgrim vs. the World	The Voice	
2011	Paul	Agent Haggard	
2011	Hoodwinked Too! Hood vs. Evil	Hansel	Voice
2012	Men in Black 3	Andy Warhol/Agent W	
2012	This Is 40	Man In Store	Uncredited cameo
2013	Escape from Planet Earth	Announcer	Uncredited voice
2013	Monsters University	Referee, Vinny	Voice
2013	Star Trek Into Darkness	USS Vengeance Computer	Voice
2013	Turbo	Guy Gagné	Voice
2013	The To Do List	Willy McLean	Also executive producer
2013	Cloudy with a Chance of Meatballs 2	Flint Lockwood	Voice
2013	Her	Chat Room Friend #2	Voice cameo
2014	The Skeleton Twins	Milo	
2014	They Came Together	Kyle	
2014	The Disappearance of Eleanor Rigby	Stuart	
2014	22 Jump Street	Culinary School Villain	Uncredited cameo
2015	Beaver Trilogy Part IV	Narrator	Voice; documentary
2015	Accidental Love	Doctor Turnstall	
2015	Trainwreck	Aaron Conners	
2015	Inside Out	Fear	Voice
2015	Maggie's Plan	Tony	
2015	Riley's First Date?	Fear, Jordan's Joy	Voice; short film
2015	Star Wars: The Force Awakens	—N/a	Vocal consultant for BB-8
2016	The Angry Birds Movie	King Leonard Mudguard	Voice
2016	Popstar: Never Stop Never Stopping	Zippy	Cameo
2016	Finding Dory	Stan	Voice cameo
2016	The BFG	Bloodbottler	Voice and motion capture
2016	Sausage Party	Firewater, Tequila, El Guaco	Voice
2017	Power Rangers	Alpha 5	Voice and motion capture
2018	Ralph Breaks the Internet	J.P. Spamley	Uncredited voice
2018	Love, Gilda	Himself	Documentary
2018	The Great Buster: A Celebration	Himself	Documentary
2019	Toy Story 4	Axel the Carnie	Voice cameo
2019	The Angry Birds Movie 2	King Leonard Mudbeard	Voice
2019	It Chapter Two	Richie Tozier	
2019	Noelle	Nick Kringle	
2020	Belushi	John Belushi	Voice; Documentary
2021	The Addams Family 2	Cyrus Strange	Voice
2022	Lightyear	Featheringhamstan	Voice
2022	Glass Onion: A Knives Out Mystery	—N/a	Special thanks
2023	Beau Is Afraid	Package Delivery Man	Cameo
2024	IF	Banana	Voice
2026	The Cat in the Hat	The Cat	Voice; also executive producer
TBA	They Know	TBA	Also writer and director
TBA	Lincoln in the Bardo	Eddie Baron / Rake	Voice; in production

== Television ==
Year	Title	Role	Notes
2005	Punk’d	Field agent	Episode: "#4.8"
2005–2013	Saturday Night Live	Various roles	159 episodes
2008–2017	Saturday Night Live Weekend Update Thursday	Various roles	7 episodes
2008–2017	South Park	Ike Broflovski, various characters	8 episodes; also creative consultant and producer
2008	Human Giant	Himself / Little Kevin	4 episodes
2008	Tim and Eric Awesome Show	James Quall	Episode: "Jazz"
2009	Xavier: Renegade Angel	Pavlov, Priest	Voice; 2 episodes
2009–2010	Aqua Teen Hunger Force	Der Inflatable Hitler, The Pod	Voice; 2 episodes
2010	Ugly Americans	William Dyer, Christ Angel	Voice; episode: "An American Werewolf in America"
2010	30 Rock	Kevin	Episode: "Live Show"
2010	Freaknik: The Musical	Tad	Voice; television film
2010	Turner Classic Movies	Himself (host)	Episode: "Bill Hader"
2010–2013	The Venture Bros.	Various characters	Voice; 7 episodes
2011	Funny or Die Presents	Athletic Trainer	4 episodes
2011	6 Days to Air: The Making of South Park	Himself	Documentary
2011–2014	Essentials, Jr.	Himself (host)	52 episodes
2012–2020	Bob's Burgers	Mickey, Big Bob Belcher	Voice; 8 episodes
2012	Yo Gabba Gabba!	Himself	Episode: "Olympics"
2012	NTSF:SD:SUV::	Tad McMilrthy	Episode: "Comic-Con-Flict"
2012	The Secret Policeman's Ball 2012	Julian Assange	Television special
2012–2014	The Mindy Project	Tom	5 episodes
2013	Portlandia	Birdman	Episode: "Blackout"
2013	The Office	Himself	Episode: "Finale"
2013	Drunk History	John Stith Pemberton	Episode: "Atlanta"
2013	Comedy Central Roast of James Franco	Himself / President of Hollywood	Television special
2013	Clear History	Rags	Television film
2013	Arcade Fire in Here Comes The Night Time	Captain Bill	Television special
2013, 2018	The Simpsons	Slava/Manacek	Voice; 2 episodes
2013–2015	The Awesomes	Dr. Giuseppe Malocchio	Voice; 22 episodes
2014–2015	Randy Cunningham: 9th Grade Ninja	Whoopee 2, Dr. Sam	Voice; 2 episodes
2014, 2018	Saturday Night Live	Himself (host)	2 episodes
2015	Man Seeking Woman	Adolf Hitler	Episode: "Lizard"
2015	Inside Amy Schumer	Cliffley Bennett, Doug	Episode: "I'm Sorry"
2015	Brooklyn Nine-Nine	Captain Seth Dozerman	Episode: "New Captain"
2015–2022	Documentary Now!	Various	14 episodes; also co-creator, writer (6 episodes) and executive producer
2016	Silicon Valley	Pipey	Voice; episode: "Daily Active Users"
2016	Finding Your Roots	Himself	Episode: "War Stories" (S06E13)
2018–2023	Barry	Barry Berkman/Barry Block/Clark	32 episodes; also co-creator, director (18 episodes); writer (12 episodes), and executive producer
2019	The Dark Crystal: Age of Resistance	urGoh/The Wanderer	Voice; 4 episodes
2021	M.O.D.O.K.	Angar the Screamer, Leader	Voice; 2 episodes
2021	Adventure Time: Distant Lands	Bufo	Voice; episode: "Wizard City"
2021	Curb Your Enthusiasm	Igor, Gregor, Timor	Episode: "Igor, Gregor, & Timor"
2022	Toast of Tinseltown	Dwight Difference	Episode: "LA Story"
2024	John Mulaney Presents: Everybody's in LA	Himself	Episode: "Earthquakes"
2025	Everybody's Live with John Mulaney	Himself	Episode: "Getting Fired"
2026	Life, Larry and the Pursuit of Unhappiness	Abraham Lincoln	Episode: "Lincoln"

== Video games ==
Year	Title	Voice role	Notes
2008	Grand Theft Auto IV	Wilson Taylor Sr.	
2014	South Park: The Stick of Truth	Firkle, Ike Broflovski, Filmore, Billy, Quaid	

== Music videos ==
Year	Title	Role	Artist
2009	"Like a Boss"	Parking Lot Guy	The Lonely Island
2010	"Great Day"	Guy with Kid	The Lonely Island
2011	"Moves"	The expecting dad at the beginning	The New Pornographers
2017	"Caroline"		Steve Martin
