= And in the End... =

- ER episode
- Episode no.: Season 15; Episode 22
- Directed by: Rod Holcomb
- Written by: John Wells
- Original air date: April 2, 2009

Episode chronology
← Previous "I Feel Good"	Next → —
- ER season 15

"And in the End..." is the series finale of the American medical drama television series ER. The two-hour episode, which serves as the 22nd episode of the fifteenth season and the 331st episode overall, was written by John Wells and directed by Rod Holcomb and aired on NBC on April 2, 2009. It was preceded by a one-hour retrospective special.

== Plot ==
Dr. Tony Gates (John Stamos) treats a teenage girl in a coma with alcohol poisoning after she played drinking games with her friends. Gates calls the police when he discovers that the parents of the girl's friend supplied the alcohol, and has the friend's father arrested. Later, the girl's parents arrive and request she be transferred to Mercy Hospital. Before she can be transferred, the girl finally awakens but just thrashes around and is sent for a new CT to diagnose possible brain damage.

Dr. Julia Wise (Alexis Bledel), new to County General, treats a gay HIV-positive patient who has severe breathing difficulties. It is discovered he has terminal cancer. With the support of his partner, he decides not to seek treatment, as he has already outlived most of his friends who died at the height of the AIDS epidemic in the 1980s.

Beverly (Jeanette Miller), an elderly patient with a broken wrist, is brought in by a fire engine. She comments on Dr. Archie Morris' (Scott Grimes) "soft and strong" hands. Beverly is later claimed by her daughter, as she had wandered off before her accident. She returns later, having wandered off again but otherwise not further injured.

A married couple comes in with the woman going into labour with twins, and John Carter (Noah Wyle) and Simon Brenner (David Lyons) handle the delivery. During the delivery of the second baby, complications set in. It is discovered that the mother has an inverted uterus, and requires an emergency caesarean section. The second baby requires intensive care, and the mother ultimately dies as surgeons attempt to fix the complications.

Mark Greene's daughter Rachel (Hallee Hirsh) is visiting the hospital as a prospective medical student and is interviewing for a spot in the teaching program. She is interviewed primarily by Catherine Banfield (Angela Bassett), who confides to Carter afterwards that she made it through the first cut. Carter shows her around after her interview, giving her a few pointers she will need when she is accepted into medical school.

Carter opens his clinic for the underprivileged, with Peter Benton (Eriq La Salle) and his son Reese (Matthew Watkins), Kerry Weaver (Laura Innes) and Susan Lewis (Sherry Stringfield) among the guests. He named the facility after his late son, Joshua. After the event, he has an awkward reunion with Joshua's mother, Kem (Thandiwe Newton), who is briefly in town; although she is happy to see Carter, she rebuffs his efforts to re-connect with her there, but does agree possibly to call him the next morning, giving hope to a potential reconciliation. He also has drinks with his old friends plus Elizabeth Corday (Alex Kingston), who has brought Rachel to Chicago for her med school interview. Benton and Corday linger together after the others have gone their separate ways.

Marjorie Manning (Beverly Polcyn), a previous elderly multiple sclerosis patient suffering sepsis and pulmonary edema, comes in with her husband, (Ernest Borgnine). Mr. Manning is initially unwilling to let Marjorie go, but, with guidance from Dr. Gates, he finally accepts the inevitable. Before Marjorie dies, her daughter arrives, and confides in Samantha Taggart (Linda Cardellini) that her mother was an incredibly difficult person who picked fights with and alienated everyone in her life, but she loved her mom anyway and was inspired by how her father was saint-like in putting up with her miserable behavior. Sam looks saddened and ashamed, as she clearly sees the parallel between Marjorie and herself, and she ends up calling her own estranged mother after Marjorie has died.

It turns out it is Samantha's birthday. Her son, Alex (Dominic Janes), reveals her present: a vintage Ford Mustang restored by Alex and Tony, who both decided upon bright red as its color over cobalt blue. Later on, while they are walking back towards the ER, Sam surprises Tony by taking his hand in hers, symbolizing that she has gotten over her previous anger at him, and he smiles and locks his fingers with hers.

A young bride and her new mother-in-law (Marilu Henner) come in, in separate ambulances, with minor injuries sustained in a drunken brawl at their wedding reception and continue arguing all the way into the treatment rooms. The groom later arrives and is promptly torn between tending to his mother and his new wife.

The episode ends with the beginning of a disaster protocol: an industrial explosion, with a minimum of eight casualties. Dr. Carter, who has decided to stay up all night to wait for his call from Kem and is hanging around the ER with Susan and Rachel, is again pressed into service to assist. Dr. Morris is ordered by Dr. Banfield to triage patients as they arrive. The first patient was thrown 20 feet and is diagnosed as a possible lacerated spleen or liver, to be sent straight to the OR. The second patient has a compound leg fracture with no circulatory impairment, which Dr. Banfield takes herself for an orthopedic consult. The third patient was electrocuted and fell into asystole on the way in, and is declared DOA. The fourth patient has smoke inhalation, relatively minor burns and a pneumothorax, and is set up for a chest tube. The fifth patient had his left arm blown off below the elbow, with nothing left to save; Dr. Gates takes him in to repair the damage to what remains. Dr. Morris gives the sixth patient to Dr. Carter: third-degree burns over 90% surface area. As he runs the patient in, Dr. Carter asks Rachel to tag along saying "Dr. Greene, you comin'?", which she does enthusiastically. As Morris continues to triage patients, the original theme music plays and the point of view pulls back, revealing the entire hospital for the first and only time.

== Production ==
The episode was structured "very much like the show's pilot. Like that first episode, it took place over the course of 24 hours, featured a dizzying number of cases — some comical, and some that were dead serious — and showed the life of the ER through eyes both inexperienced ... and jaded." It featured several direct references to the pilot and other early episodes, including: Dr. Archie Morris is woken by veteran nurse Lydia Wright, who had done the same to Dr. Mark Greene in the pilot (the shot is used in several early episodes); Dr. John Carter demonstrating how to start an IV to Rachel Greene exactly as Dr. Peter Benton showed him in the pilot; a comedic scene dealing with a child who had swallowed a rosary, as in the pilot, when a child swallowed a key; and the day marked by cutscenes showing the time at the start of each act as was done in the series' fifth episode, "Into That Good Night", with both episodes starting and ending at 4:00 AM. A portion of the storyline was inspired by the death of producer John Wells' 17-year-old niece, who died of alcohol poisoning in December 2008.

The episode featured full-length opening credits from the first season (albeit with shots and credits added for both the final regular cast, and five of the past stars that appeared) with music by James Newton Howard, the show's original composer. That theme music also played as the camera pulled out and faded at the end of the last scene of the episode, which showed the entire exterior of County General Hospital for the only time in the history of the series, except in high tone and fully in 1080i HD.

== Starring ==
- Noah Wyle as Dr. John Carter
- Laura Innes as Dr. Kerry Weaver
- Sherry Stringfield as Dr. Susan Lewis
- David Lyons as Dr. Simon Brenner
- Alex Kingston as Dr. Elizabeth Corday
- Parminder Nagra as Dr. Neela Rasgotra
- John Stamos as Dr. Tony Gates
- Linda Cardellini as Nurse Samantha Taggart
- Scott Grimes as Dr. Archie Morris
- Eriq La Salle as Dr. Peter Benton
- Angela Bassett as Dr. Catherine Banfield

== Guest starring ==
Doctors

- Alexis Bledel as Dr. Julia Wise - Intern
- Emily Rose as Dr. Tracy Martin - Intern
- Victor Rasuk as Dr. Ryan Sanchez - Intern
- Bresha Webb as Dr. Laverne St. John - Intern

Nurses

- Ellen Crawford as Nurse Lydia Wright - first on-screen appearance since 2003
- Deezer D as Nurse Malik McGrath
- Lily Mariye as Nurse Lily Jarvik
- Yvette Freeman as Nurse Haleh Adams
- Laura Cerón as Nurse Chuny Marquez
- Angel Laketa Moore as Nurse Dawn Archer
- Nasim Pedrad as Nurse Suri

Staff

- Troy Evans as Desk Clerk Frank Martin
- Abraham Benrubi as Desk Clerk Jerry Markovic
- Sam Jones III as Charles "Chaz" Pratt Jr.

Paramedics

- Loui Liberti as Paramedic Bardelli
- Monte Russell as Paramedic Zadro White
- Emily Wagner as Paramedic Doris Pickman
- Brian Lester as Paramedic Brian Dumar
- Lyn Alicia Henderson as Paramedic Pamela Olbes
- Demitrius Navarro as Paramedic Morales
- Michele C. Bonilla as Paramedic Harms
- Brendan Patrick Connor as Paramedic Reidy

== Reception ==
=== Ratings ===
According to Nielsen ratings, the finale gave NBC "its best ratings on the night in a long time." The first hour received a 9.6 rating and a 15 share, numbers which improved to an 11.1 rating and 19 share in the final hour. Overall the finale attracted an average of 16.2 million viewers.

The series finale of ER scored the highest 18-49 rating for a drama series finale since The X-Files wrapped with a 6.3 on May 19, 2002. In total viewers, ER assembled the biggest overall audience for a drama series finale since Murder, She Wrote concluded with 16.5 million on May 19, 1996.

In Canada, the finale fared even better on a percentage basis with 2.768 million viewers. With ten times less the population, this equates to roughly 27.68 million American viewers.

=== Critical reception ===
In his review in the then-St. Petersburg Times, Eric Deggans called the final episode "a welcome reminder of why the show has lasted 15 years on network television – and proof of why it's now time for the show to go." He continued, "Thanks to cameo appearances by most key actors whose characters remain alive... the episode had the feel of a friendly class reunion... Once upon a time, the cases that filled Thursday's episode would have felt groundbreaking and fresh... But on Thursday, these contrivances felt like shadows echoing other, better episodes long past... Wells echoed the series most consistent theme by showing old and new doctors uniting to handle yet another emergency at the finale's end. But Thursday's episode also proved that NBC's ER called it quits at just the right time, because TV series – unlike medical institutions – should never go on forever."

Ken Tucker of Entertainment Weekly said he "liked the fact that the surprises were small but effective," while Alan Sepinwall of the Star-Ledger stated, "It wasn't an all-time great finale, but it did what it set out to do." In The Baltimore Sun, David Zurawik said, "I especially liked the final scene with the ER team suiting up and standing ready to respond in the courtyard to the arriving fleet of emergency vehicles loaded with victims of an industrial explosion. Perhaps, it was one last tweak at the critics who said the pilot looked more like a feature film and would never make it as a TV series – because it was definitely a movie ending." The episode received an A− from The A.V. Club.

In 2010, Time magazine ranked the episode as #10 on its list of the most anticipated TV finales.

=== Awards ===
At the 2009 Primetime Emmy Awards Rod Holcomb won the Emmy for Outstanding Directing for a Drama Series for his work on this episode, while Ernest Borgnine was nominated for the Emmy for Outstanding Guest Actor in a Drama Series.
