= Samantha Taggart =

Fictional TV character

- Linda Cardellini as Sam Taggart
- First appearance: October 30, 2003 (10x05, "Out of Africa")
- Last appearance: April 2, 2009 (15x22, "And In the End...")
- Portrayed by: Linda Cardellini
- Duration: 2003–09

In-universe information
- Nickname: Sam
- Gender: Female
- Title: Nurse Manager (2003–2009)
- Occupation: ED
- Family: Mary Taggart (mother); Kelly (younger sister); Gracie (grandmother); Tony Gates (boyfriend); Steve Curtis (ex-boyfriend and Alex's father, deceased); Luka Kovač (ex-boyfriend)
- Children: Alex Taggart (son); Sarah Riley (adoptive stepdaughter)
- Born: April 2, 1979

Samantha "Sam" Taggart is a fictional character on the NBC television drama ER. She is played by actress Linda Cardellini. Linda Cardellini's addition into the main cast opening credits was in 2003, in the fifth episode of season 10.

== Character background ==
Sam is a nurse and single mother. She has a son Alex (played first by Oliver Davis, later by Dominic Janes). Alex was born when she was a teenager. Since then, Sam has avoided close relationships with men.

She comes from a family of alcoholics; her anger toward Abby Lockhart in Season 14 when Abby tells the staff she had a relapse while working is explained when she tells Abby that she came from a long line of drunks who never tried to stop drinking.

== Storylines ==
Viewers first meet Sam in the Season 10 episode "Out of Africa," where she distinguishes herself by quickly and effectively giving an intravenous sedative to an unruly patient, even impressing the usually stubborn Dr. Romano. Sam shows herself to be an assertive, experienced, and talented nurse throughout the episode, though she loses her professionalism a bit when she discovers Dr. Luka Kovač's unknowing part in her son Alex's diabetic fit while he befriends the boy. She replaces Abby Lockhart who was head nurse, but decided to become a doctor instead. Her no nonsense attitude had gotten her in trouble early on. In the episode "Death and Taxes", she took Dr. Robert Romano's mechanical hand after the ER Chief touched her inappropriately with the device. In addition, in the episode "Impulse Control", she punches an assault victim's abusive boyfriend in the face when he threatens her as she tries to call the police, but overcomes Dr. Kerry Weaver's knee-jerk lack of support and helps the abuse victim follow through on pressing charges.

Sam soon notices a bond between Alex and Luka. Though initially uncomfortable with Luka's involvement with Alex, Sam eventually accepts it and becomes good friends with Luka. Later, a romantic relationship develops. Unexpectedly, Alex's father, Steve (played by Cole Hauser), returns and attempts to push Luka out of their lives. When she discovers Steve might stay permanently, Sam panics, packs up, and runs away. Before doing so, however, Luka runs to her, trying to get information from her as to why was she is doing this. Ignoring him and his slams on the car, fighting tears, she drives away. Sam has had a history of picking up and moving around the country to escape Steve. She worries that he will ruin her and Alex's life and that they cannot coexist with Steve.

She does come back thanks to Luka who finds her at a motel and brings her back. They move in together. Throughout season 11, Sam and Luka lived together, and Luka was a surrogate father for Alex, even going and meeting with a school official after Alex got caught with an issue of MAXIM magazine. At the end of season 11, Alex runs away to find Steve (now played by Garret Dillahunt), by hitchhiking after a confrontation with Sam. He is out to find Steve in Colorado, even though Sam has hidden the fact Steve is there because he is in jail on robbery charges. Luka and Sam are frantically searching for him in the opener of season 12. Sam is desperately worried about Alex because of his diabetes, and his lack of insulin could have resulted in a coma or even death. Sam immediately gets in the car and drives non-stop to Colorado. Luka worries about Sam because they have been driving non-stop, and even hit a deer which completely destroys the windshield. Sam and Luka finally find an exhausted but stable Alex at a Canyon City hospital, where he claims he's okay and that he knows how to take care of himself. At this point, Sam realizes her relationship with Luka is not going to work; her personal life is too hectic for him to deal with, the two of them have communication problems, and Luka's special bond with Alex has been eclipsed by Alex's knowledge that his father is in jail. Sam breaks up with Luka awkwardly near the beginning of Season 12. Several episodes later, though, they appear to be friends again.

She met and immediately befriended Dr. John Carter upon his return from Africa, happy to "put a face to the name".

Later in season 12, a wealthy patient named Richard Elliot (played by Armand Assante) enters the ER. He has a debilitating disease and needs an in-home nurse. He takes a liking to Sam and offers her a well-paid position as head nurse. He assures her that she would still be able to keep her job in the ER, and invites her and Alex to live in a section of his mansion for convenience. She denies at first, but upon discovering that Alex cannot be in the tutoring program due to lack of funds, she visits Elliot's home and asks if the offer still stands.

In the 12th-season finale, "21 Guns", Steve, an EMT Student named Mary and another prisoner named Rafe hatch an escape plot: Steve and Rafe injuring themselves and then escaping from the hospital. They stab Luka with a syringe as Sam looks on in horror. Because the syringe contained vecuronium that would have led to respiratory depression and death, Sam steps in and treats him in spite of the prisoners' threats, saying she is going to make sure he doesn't die regardless of what they say; Steve makes his partners back off long enough for Sam to intubate Luka. They proceed to start shooting throughout the hospital once police catch on, using Sam as a hostage. Jerry Markovic is hurt in the shooting. Steve drags Sam outside, towards the getaway van. She begs him, "Think about Alex!" but as it turns out, he already had, and Alex is tied up inside the van. Sam immediately gets in the van after seeing Alex, and later, Steve tells her that God spoke to him, and told him he had to get his family back together. With Sam and Alex as hostages, the three attempt to make an escape to Canada.

However, in the 13th-season premiere, "Bloodline," the escape hits a few obstacles; Sam attempts to get help, and a police officer chases after the group, ending with the officer's (presumed) death. As the three argue about the escape plan, Steve shoots and kills Rafe and Mary, leaving only Steve, Sam and Alex. Steve tells Sam that he would rather have himself, Sam and Alex dead than apart, and then proceeds to rape Sam. Some time after, Sam, lying next to a sleeping Steve, proceeds to make her getaway with Alex. As she is about to escape, however, she returns to the still-sleeping Steve, grabs his gun and kills him.

The next morning, she and Alex drive back to Chicago. Tired and panicked from her ordeal, she contacts Richard Elliot, who gets her an attorney, and instructs Sam to tell everyone she was raped by Steve and later killed him in self-defense. Despite an assistant District Attorney's suspicions that Sam is lying, Elliot, through his close friendship with highly placed city officials, manages to get Steve's death listed as a justifiable homicide, thus ending Sam's legal troubles. In "Somebody To Love", Alex tells Sam he saw her shoot Steve dead.

In the remaining episodes of Season 13, Alex steals a credit card from Archie Morris, and accidentally sets their apartment on fire by playing with alcohol. Sam reluctantly sends Alex to a school for at-risk youth, and reports to her ER colleagues that he is doing better every day. Professionally, Sam has started training as a nurse anesthetist.

Sam's relationship with Abby Lockhart goes through several phases in Season 14; she initially tries to comfort her when Abby's two-year-old son Joe sustains a head injury, but later treats her with anger and disgust when she finds out Abby is an alcoholic who recently had a severe relapse after several years of sobriety. The two mend fences, however, and during her last shift at County in "The Book of Abby", Abby fiercely defends Sam to the board (who are investigating her) saying to Sam, "nurses have gotta stick together."

At the end of "The Chicago Way," it is implied that either Samantha or Dr. Greg Pratt entered a booby-trapped ambulance. The subsequent explosion resulted in a season-ending cliffhanger. The Season 15 opener, "Life after Death", revealed that Dr. Greg Pratt was in the ambulance and later died from injuries sustained in the blast.

Towards the end of Season 14, Sam begins a relationship with Dr. Tony Gates. Their relationship progresses and they end up moving in together in Season 15. After Alex was seriously injured in a car accident after Tony overruled Sam by allowing Alex to go out, their relationship deteriorates and Sam eventually decides to move out, thus ending the relationship, despite Tony's multiple apologies. Things are frosty between them as Sam cannot forgive Tony, however she admits to Chuny that she still loves him but forbids her from telling anyone.

In "A Long, Strange Trip", Sam was reunited with younger sister Kelly (played by Shannon Woodward), now a successful fashion designer, for the first time since their mother kicked Sam out when she was a pregnant 15-year-old. Kelly tells Sam how their mother is dying of emphysema, and after reminiscing about their childhood, Sam relents and agrees to allow Kelly to move their mother to a Chicago nursing home. Sam sees her mother for the first time in 15 years in the episode "T Minus 6", but Mary Taggart does not recognise her daughter. In the next episode, Sam is shown visiting her mother in the nursing home, where they argue about why Sam lost contact with her family, before Mary asks Sam about her son.

In the Season 15 episode "Old Times", Sam accompanies Neela to Seattle to pick up a kidney for a transplant in Chicago. She briefly met Carol Hathaway and Dr. Doug Ross who revealed how they used to work at County.

In the series finale "And in the End," the staff celebrates her birthday and Alex delivers her present: a bright red vintage Ford Mustang convertible, which Tony bought and fixed up with Alex's help. When she and Tony witness a husband losing his wife (and the description of his daughter about how he never lost his love for her despite her very negative and critical ways clearly resonates with Sam), they hold each other's hands, hinting that they might rekindle their relationship.
