= Linda Cardellini =

American actress (born 1975)

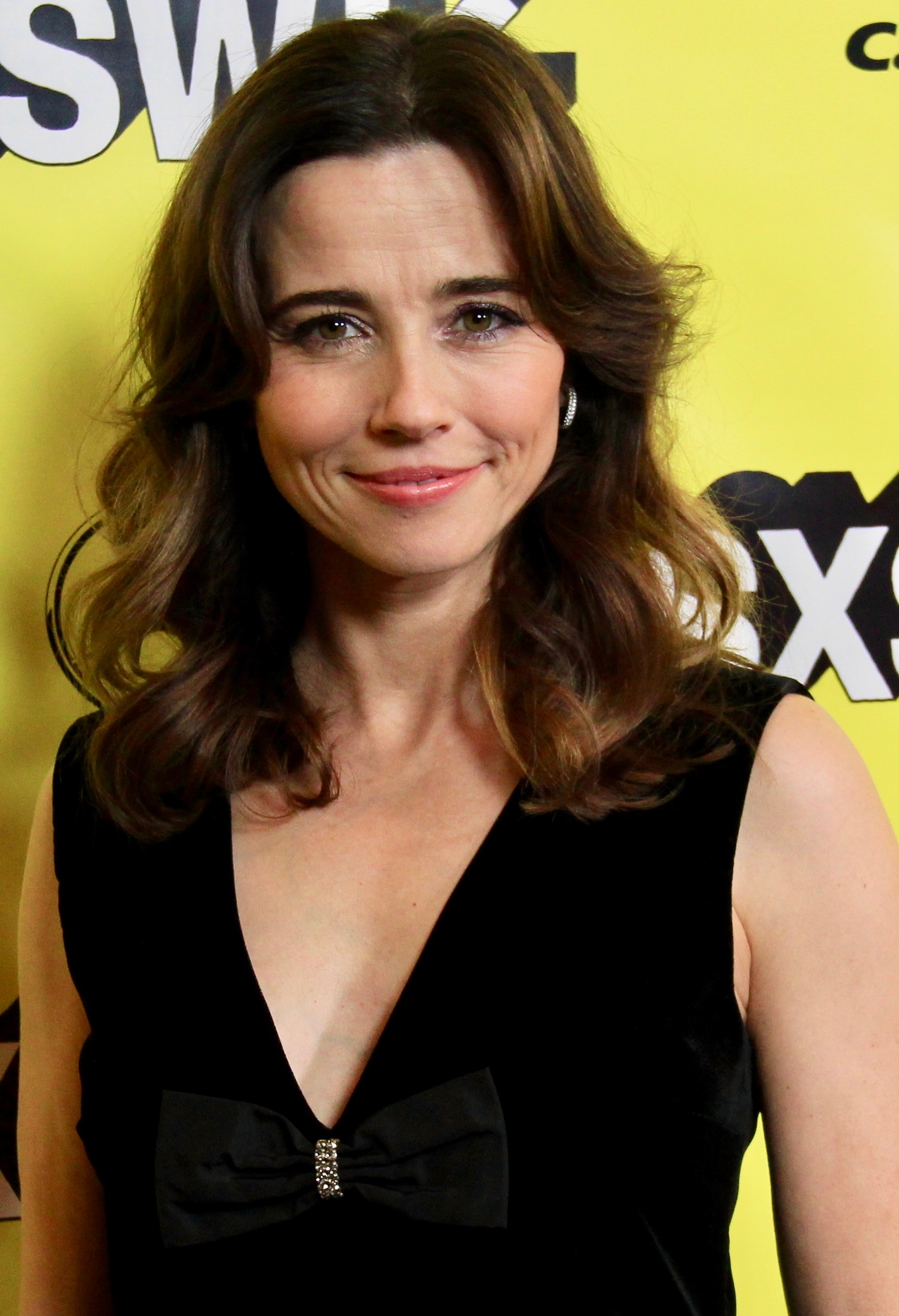
- Cardellini in 2019
- Born: Linda Edna Cardellini; June 25, 1975 (age 51); Redwood City, California, U.S.
- Education: Loyola Marymount University
- Occupation: Actress
- Years active: 1996–present
- Works: Full list
- Partner(s): Steven Rodriguez (2009–present; engaged)
- Children: 1

Linda Edna Cardellini (born June 25, 1975) is an American actress. In television, she is known for her starring roles in the teen drama Freaks and Geeks (1999–2000), the medical drama ER (2003–2009), and the thriller Bloodline (2015–2017), as well as for her guest role as Sylvia Rosen on AMC's Mad Men (2013–2015). Her starring role in the Netflix dark comedy series Dead to Me (2019–2022) earned her a nomination for a Primetime Emmy Award for Outstanding Lead Actress in a Comedy Series. Cardellini also portrayed Pamela Voorhees in Crystal Lake (2026).

In film, Cardellini became known for playing Velma Dinkley in Scooby-Doo (2002) and its 2004 sequel. Her other credits include Legally Blonde (2001), Brokeback Mountain (2005), Daddy's Home (2015) and its sequel Daddy's Home 2 (2017), The Founder (2016), Green Book (2018), A Simple Favor (2018), and The Curse of La Llorona (2019). She also played Laura Barton and voiced Lylla in the Marvel Cinematic Universe. She received critical acclaim for her performance in the HBO miniseries DTF St. Louis (2026), including a Primetime Emmy Award for Outstanding Supporting Actress in a Limited or Anthology Series or Movie.

== Early life and education ==
Cardellini was born on June 25, 1975, in Redwood City, California, United States. Her father, Wayne David Cardellini, was a businessman, and her mother, Lorraine (née Hernan), a homemaker. She is the youngest of four children and is of Italian, Irish, German, and Scottish descent. Cardellini was raised in the San Francisco Bay Area and had a Catholic upbringing.

She made her first public appearance at age ten when she sang in a school play. Subsequently, she acted in several school productions and started taking drama lessons. Cardellini graduated from St. Francis High School in Mountain View in 1993 and then moved to Los Angeles to seek roles in television and film. She was a contestant in a 1994 episode of The Price Is Right, winning a fireplace. Cardellini attended Loyola Marymount University's College of Communication and Fine Arts, where she graduated with a degree in theater arts in 1997. She was recognized as a "Distinguished Alumna" by the university in 2007.

== Career ==
=== 1996–2009: Early roles and breakthrough ===
Cardellini received her first big break role in 1996 as Sarah on ABC's Saturday morning live-action children's series, Bone Chillers. At the time, she was in college and worked at an ice cream shop. Following this, she made guest appearances on prime-time programs including Step by Step, Clueless, and 3rd Rock from the Sun. She would then play Lauren on Boy Meets World, a girl who came between the show's star couple. Cardellini starred in the first season of the AMC series The Lot in 1999, and spent the summer in Europe as part of a touring production of Lancelot, a fourteenth-century Dutch tragedy.

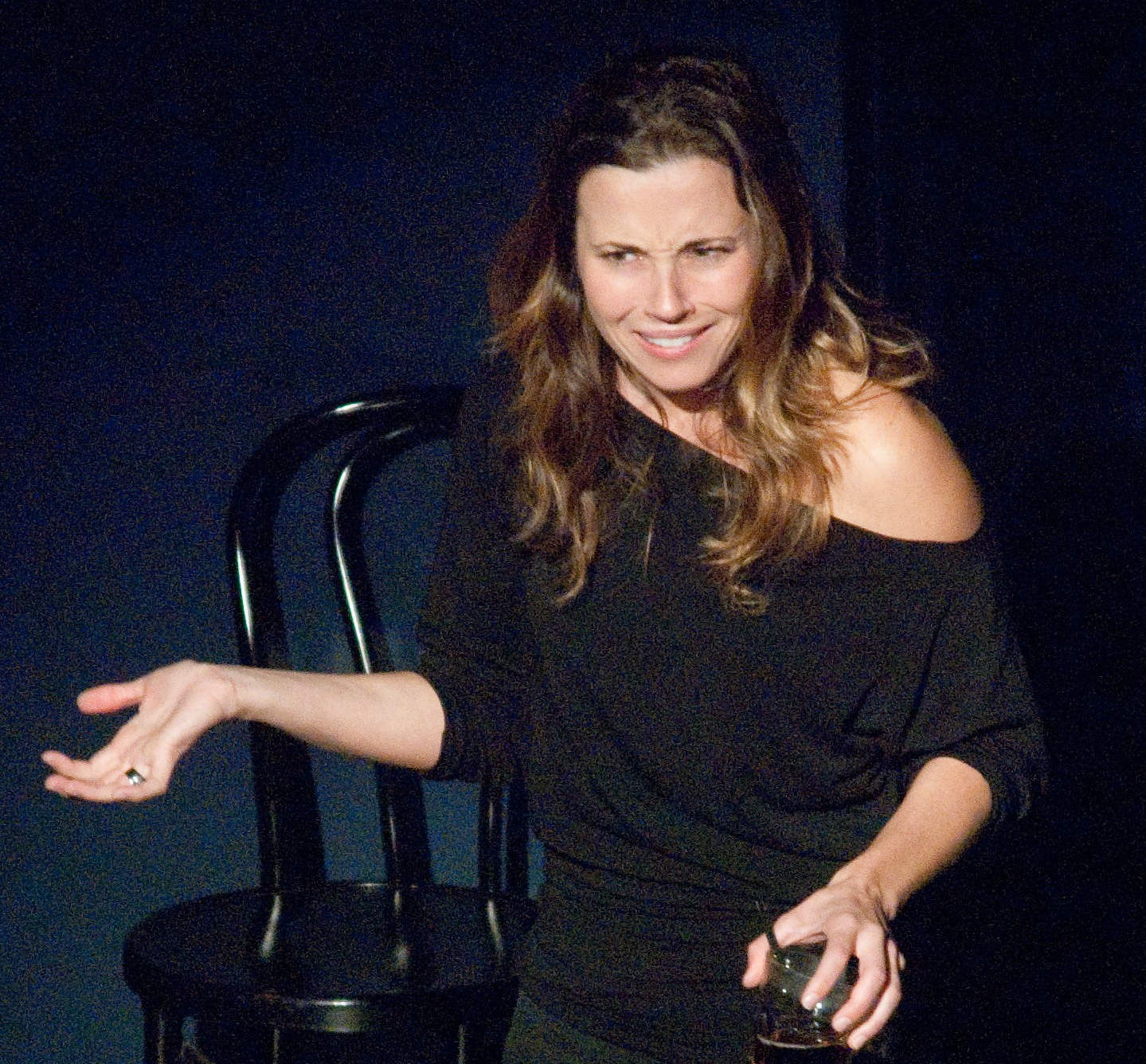
Cardellini as part of Dr. God, 2010

Cardellini had her first major success when she landed one of the starring roles in the NBC series Freaks and Geeks, in 1999, playing the role of Lindsay Weir, an honor student in the midst of an identity crisis. Cardellini starred in the live-action adaptation of Scooby-Doo in 2002, in which she played the cartoon character Velma Dinkley. She later reprised the role of Velma in 2004's Scooby-Doo 2: Monsters Unleashed. She joined the cast of the hospital drama ER in 2003 as Samantha Taggart, a free-spirited nurse. Cardellini was on ER for six seasons, until the series finale ("And in the End..."), and won the TV Land ensemble Icon Award in 2009 with her ER costars.

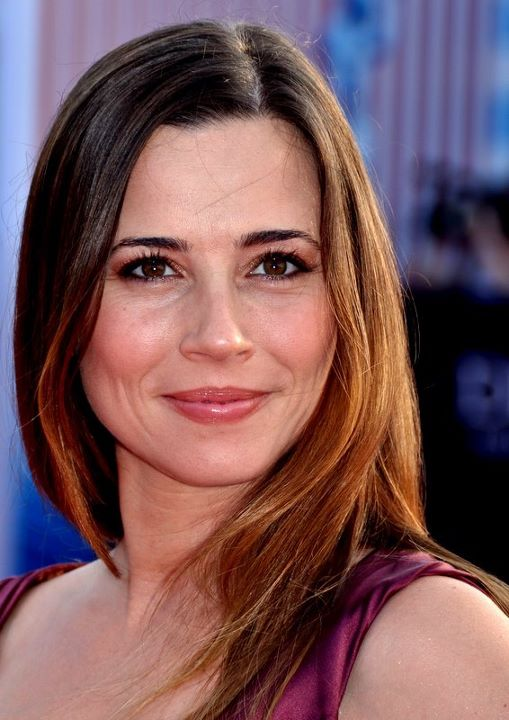
Cardellini at the 2011 Deauville American Film Festival

Her other film work includes roles in Dead Man on Campus, Strangeland, Good Burger, Legally Blonde, Brokeback Mountain (for which she was nominated for the ensemble Gotham and Screen Actors Guild awards), and a starring role in the Happy Madison film Grandma's Boy as Samantha. She was the voice of Ursula in the role-playing video game Gladius, and played the voice of Bliss Goode on the ABC animated series The Goode Family. In 2007, Cardellini played lovelorn Clara in the CBS miniseries Comanche Moon, a prequel to 1989's Lonesome Dove.

=== 2010–2019: Marvel films, animation roles, and television ===
In 2010 and 2011, Cardellini returned to the stage with the Dr. God comedy group in Los Angeles and San Francisco, appeared in Kill the Irishman and Super, and starred in the independent film Return. She appeared with cast members and producers of Freaks and Geeks and Undeclared at the Paley Center for Media PaleyFest on March 12, 2011. From 2012 to 2016, she provided the voice of Wendy Corduroy on the Disney Channel animated series Gravity Falls.

Cardellini moved to voice acting roles periodically, appearing on the podcast and live show The Thrilling Adventure Hour, specifically on the Sparks Nevada: Marshal on Mars segments.

In 2013, she was chosen to play Sylvia Rosen, a love interest of Don Draper on Mad Men. For her performance on Mad Men, she received a nomination for the Primetime Emmy Award for Outstanding Guest Actress in a Drama Series.

In 2015, she played Hawkeye's wife Laura Barton in Avengers: Age of Ultron, a role she reprised in the 2019 sequel Avengers: Endgame. Starting in 2015, she joined Kyle Chandler on a new Netflix drama series Bloodline, from the creators of Damages. The show was canceled in 2016, and ended after its third season. That same year, she also had a starring role as Sara Whitaker in the comedy film Daddy's Home. In 2017, she reprised her role in the sequel film Daddy's Home 2.

In August 2018, Cardellini was cast to co-star with Christina Applegate in Netflix's dark comedy series Dead to Me. It premiered on May 3, 2019. For her performance, she received critical acclaim and a nomination for the Primetime Emmy Award for Outstanding Lead Actress in a Comedy Series. That same year, she co-starred with Viggo Mortensen and Mahershala Ali in the film Green Book, which won the Academy Award for Best Picture.

In 2019, she starred in the horror film The Curse of La Llorona.

=== 2020–present: Horror roles and other work ===
In 2020, Cardellini appeared in the biographical drama film Capone as Mae Capone, the wife of the title character.

In 2021, she reprised her role of Laura Barton in the Marvel Studios show Hawkeye, which premiered on Disney+ in November 2021. She starred in the Netflix series No Good Deed, which was released on December 12, 2024.

In 2024, Cardellini joined the cast of Way of the Warrior Kid to play Marc's mom and Jake's older sister, Sarah.

In 2026, she appeared as Pamela Voorhees, mother of Jason Voorhees, in the Peacock series Crystal Lake, a prequel to the Friday the 13th film series.

On April 13, 2026, it was announced that she would be joining the cast of Bill Hader's featured directorial debut They Know.

== Personal life ==
Cardellini dated her Freaks and Geeks co-star Jason Segel for several years following the show's cancellation in 2000 until their breakup in 2007. She and her boyfriend Steven Rodriguez had their daughter in February 2012. She and Rodriguez became engaged in June 2013.

Cardellini divides her time between the San Francisco Bay area and Los Angeles. She and her family own a country home in Woodside, California, where she enjoys horseback riding. She is Catholic.

== Awards and nominations ==
Year	Association	Category	Nominated work	Result	Ref.
2005	Gotham Awards	Best Ensemble Cast	Brokeback Mountain	Nominated	
2006	Screen Actors Guild Awards	Outstanding Performance by a Cast in a Motion Picture	Brokeback Mountain	Nominated	
2009	TV Land Awards	Icon Award	ER	Won	
2013	Primetime Emmy Awards	Outstanding Guest Actress in a Drama Series	Mad Men (Season 6)	Nominated	
2013	Independent Spirit Awards	Best Female Lead	Return	Nominated	
2019	MTV Movie & TV Awards	Best Frightened Performance	The Curse of La Llorona	Nominated	
2020	Primetime Emmy Awards	Outstanding Comedy Series	Dead to Me	Nominated	
2020	Primetime Emmy Awards	Outstanding Lead Actress in a Comedy Series	Dead to Me	Nominated	
2021	Satellite Awards	Best Actress in a Musical or Comedy Series	Dead to Me	Nominated	
2021	Screen Actors Guild Awards	Outstanding Performance by a Female Actor in a Comedy Series	Dead to Me	Nominated	
2021	Screen Actors Guild Awards	Outstanding Performance by an Ensemble in a Comedy Series	Dead to Me	Nominated	
2026	Gotham TV Awards	Outstanding Supporting Performance in a Limited or Anthology Series	DTF St. Louis	Nominated	
2026	Astra TV Awards	Best Supporting Actress in a Limited Series or TV Movie	DTF St. Louis	Won	
2026	Gold Derby TV Awards	Limited/Movie Supporting Actress	DTF St. Louis	Nominated	
2026	Primetime Emmy Awards	Outstanding Supporting Actress in a Limited or Anthology Series or Movie	DTF St. Louis	Won	
