= Bill Hader =

American actor and comedian (born 1978)

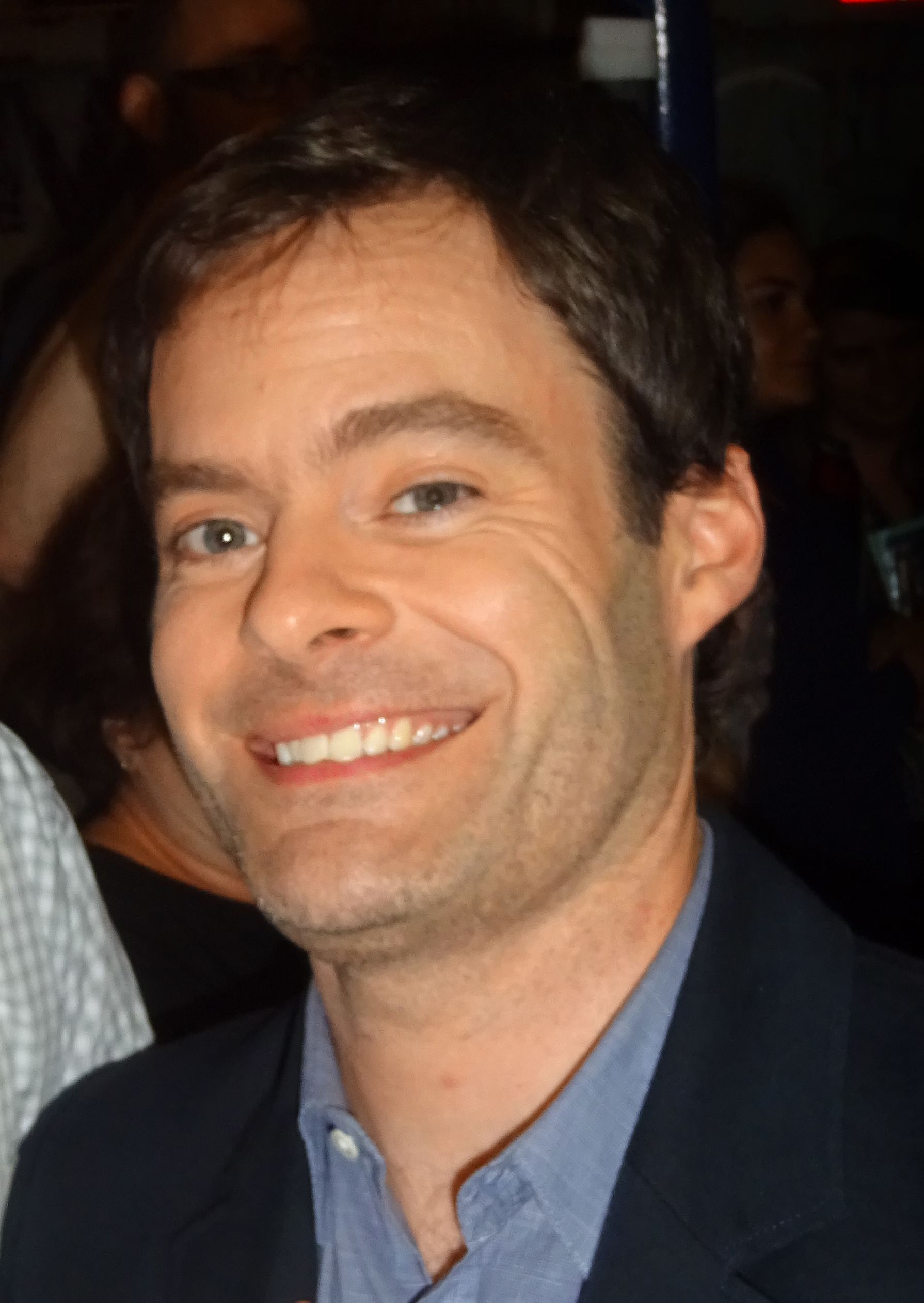
- Hader in 2016
- Born: William Thomas Hader Jr. June 7, 1978 (age 48); Tulsa, Oklahoma, U.S.
- Occupations: Actor; comedian; writer; producer; director
- Years active: 1999–present
- Works: Full list
- Spouse: Maggie Carey (m. 2006; div. 2018)
- Children: 3
- Awards: Full list

William Thomas Hader Jr. (born June 7, 1978) is an American actor, comedian, and filmmaker. He was a cast member on the NBC sketch comedy series Saturday Night Live from 2005 to 2013, for which he received four Primetime Emmy Award nominations and a Peabody Award. He became known for his impressions and especially for his work on the Weekend Update segments, where he played Stefon, a flamboyant New York City nightclub tour guide.

Hader co-created the HBO dark comedy series Barry (2018–2023) with Alec Berg, in addition to playing the title role of Barry Berkman. He also served as producer, writer and director, for which his efforts garnered him eight Emmy Award nominations for the series. He won two, consecutively, for Outstanding Lead Actor in a Comedy Series. He is a star and producer of the IFC mockumentary comedy series Documentary Now! (2015–2022) along with Fred Armisen and Seth Meyers. He was Emmy-nominated for his guest role in Curb Your Enthusiasm in 2022.

In film, he took supporting roles in Hot Rod (2007), Superbad (2007), Forgetting Sarah Marshall (2008), Adventureland (2009) and The BFG (2016), with leading roles in The Skeleton Twins (2014), Trainwreck (2015), and as an adult Richie Tozier in It Chapter Two (2019).

His extensive voice acting work includes such films as the Cloudy with a Chance of Meatballs film series (2009–present) and The Angry Birds Movie franchise (2016-present), Monsters University (2013), Inside Out (2015), Finding Dory, Sausage Party (both 2016), Toy Story 4 (2019), and Lightyear (2022), and The Cat in the Hat (2026).

== Early life and education ==
William Thomas Hader Jr. was born in Tulsa, Oklahoma on June 7, 1978, the son of dance teacher Sherri and air cargo company owner, restaurant manager, truck driver and occasional stand-up comedian Bill Hader Sr. He has two younger sisters, Katie and Kara. His ancestry includes Danish, English, German and Irish. He attended Patrick Henry Elementary School, Edison Junior High and Cascia Hall Preparatory School.

Hader grew up with writer Duffy Boudreau, with whom he later collaborated. He says he "had a hard time focusing in class" and "was always joking around". Feeling he did not fit in, Hader filled his time watching movies and reading. He appreciated Monty Python, British comedy, and the films of Woody Allen and Mel Brooks, much of which his father showed him. He made short films with friends and starred in a school production of The Glass Menagerie. He was unable to gain admission to top film schools because of his "abysmal" grades, so he enrolled at The Art Institute of Phoenix, and later Scottsdale Community College. Hader's first job was as a Christmas tree salesman. He was also an usher at a Tempe cinema, where he could see films for free, but was fired for spoiling the ending of Titanic (1997) for unruly viewers. At Scottsdale Community College, he met Nicholas Jasenovec, who later directed Paper Heart (2009). In May 2024, Hader gave the commencement speech for Chapman University's graduating class and received an honorary Doctor of Arts degree.

== Career ==
=== 1999–2004: Early career ===
Hader's aspirations of becoming a filmmaker eventually led him to drop out of college and move to Los Angeles in 1999. His parents supported his decision, and let him use the money they had saved for his education for his living expenses. He found work as a production assistant (PA) while scouring the back pages of The Hollywood Reporter, and hoped to become an assistant director. He spent much of his life as a young man "lonely and underemployed" and large amounts of his time watching movies. He regularly worked 18-hour days as a PA, leaving little time to pursue his creative ambitions. He was a PA on the documentary Empire of Dreams: The Story of the Star Wars Trilogy (2004) and the feature films James Dean (2001), Spider-Man (2002) and Collateral Damage (2002). He was also a post-production assistant on the VH1 reality show The Surreal Life (2003–2006). He was briefly a PA and stage manager on Playboy TV's sexual fantasy show Night Calls, but soon quit as he feared it would disappoint his parents. He eventually quit being a PA altogether after a bad experience while shooting The Scorpion King (2002).

Hader subsequently got a job as a night-time assistant editor at the post-production facility Triage Entertainment. He invested money in his own short film, but was too embarrassed to release it. Shortly thereafter, he and his then-longtime girlfriend broke up. Desperate for a change, he began attending comedy classes with friends at improvisational comedy enterprise the Second City in March 2003. He quickly realized that comedy was the creative outlet he had been looking for, and soon he, his new comedy compatriot Matt Offerman, and their two friends and fellow humor enthusiasts Eric Filipkowski and Mel Cowan formed a sketch comedy group, which they called Animals From The Future, and performed frequently for small audiences at backyard shows in Van Nuys. Matt's brother, actor Nick Offerman, told his wife, Megan Mullally, about them. After attending one of their backyard shows, Mullally told Hader she wanted to discuss him with Lorne Michaels of Saturday Night Live (SNL). After Mullally's recommendation, Hader was invited to fly to New York to audition for SNL producers. He had no material prepared when he was invited to audition, and was nervous and struggled to display his strengths during the audition. This resulted in his spontaneous imitation of an Italian man he had once overheard; the impression later become Vinny Vedecci, the first of his many recurring characters on the show. As a result of the audition, Hader got an agent and manager. Just before he was invited to work on SNL, he worked as an assistant editor on Iron Chef America.

=== 2005–2013: Breakthrough and Saturday Night Live ===
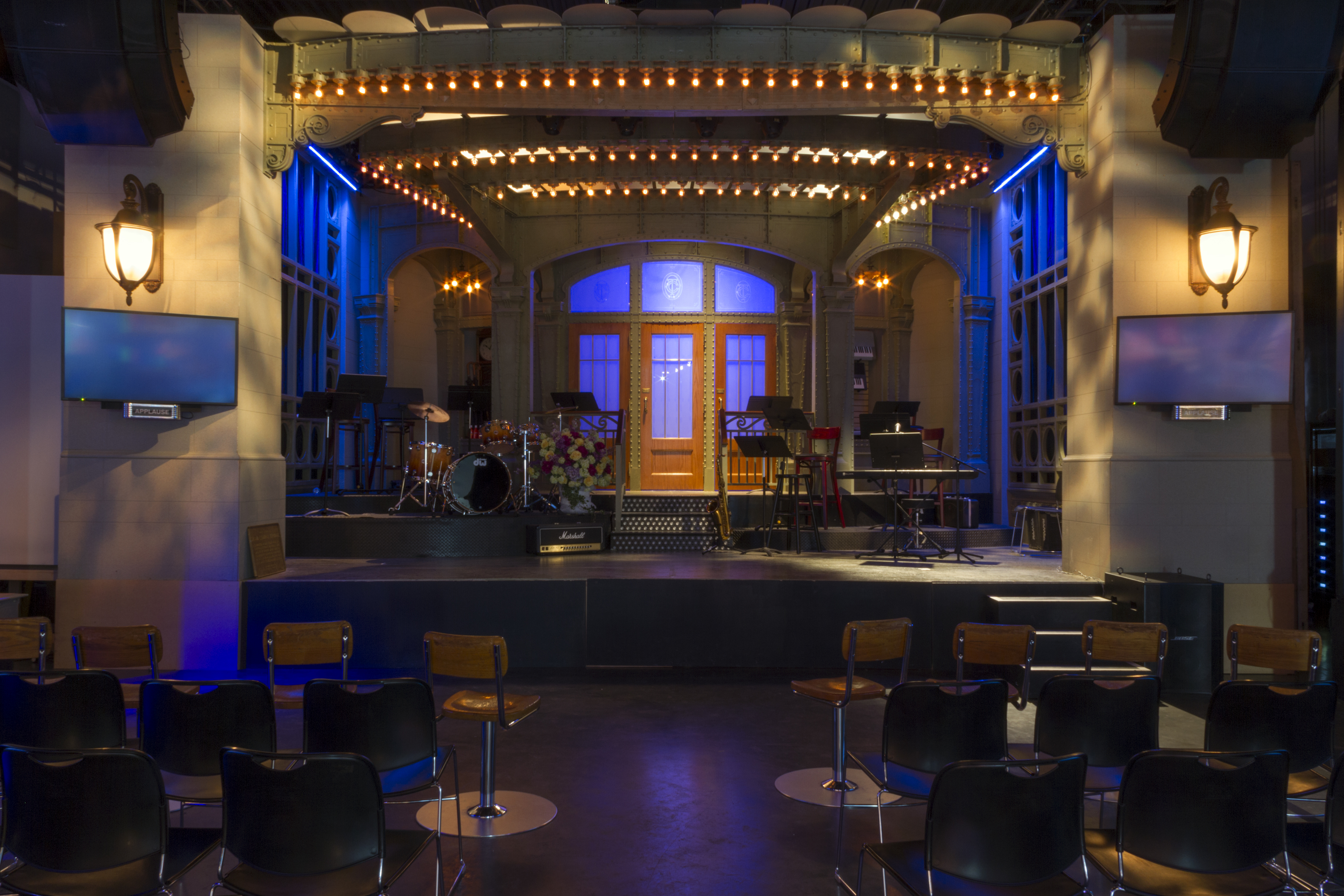
Hader was a cast member on Saturday Night Live from 2005 to 2013.

Hader was hired as a featured player and made his debut on the show on October 1, 2005. His first role was as a psychologist giving his views about life and death during the emergency landing of JetBlue Airways Flight 292. He felt he had gone from "preschool to Harvard." He became the "impressions guy", hoping to fill a utility-player role "like his hero Phil Hartman." Hader has said that he performed impersonations of teachers and friends when he was growing up but did not do impersonations of famous people until his Saturday Night Live audition. His list of impressions includes Vincent Price in the Variety Vault sketches, Keith Morrison, Harvey Fierstein, Al Pacino, Rick Perry, John Malkovich, James Carville, Julian Assange, Eliot Spitzer, Alan Alda, Clint Eastwood, and Charlie Sheen. On July 19, 2012, Hader received his first nomination for a Primetime Emmy Award for Outstanding Supporting Actor in a Comedy Series for his work on SNL. He is the first male SNL cast member to receive this nomination since Eddie Murphy in 1986.

Among the characters Hader played was Stefon, Weekend Update's flamboyant New York correspondent, whose recommendations consisted solely of bizarre nightclubs involving nightmarish characters, and was in love with and married to Seth Meyers. Stefon was originally a one-shot character on a season-34 sketch where a screenwriter named David Zolesky (played by Ben Affleck) invited his estranged brother Stefon over to pitch a family-friendly sports drama about a college student who bonded with his grandfather so he could try out for the college football team. He was based on two people that fellow SNL writer John Mulaney and Hader met: a wannabe club owner who always invited Mulaney to weird underground clubs, and a barista Hader had met who looked, spoke, and dressed like Stefon.

Hader made his film debut in the comedic film You, Me and Dupree (2006). The following year he took numerous roles including a supporting role as Officer Slater alongside Seth Rogen's Officer Michaels in the Greg Mottola directed Superbad (2007). His role in Superbad helped boost his public awareness and allowed him to appear on mainstream programs like Total Request Live, The Tonight Show, and MTV's Video Music Awards. Other roles that year included as Katherine Heigl's character's editor at E! in the Judd Apatow directed comedy Knocked Up, the acid-taking mechanic Dave in Hot Rod alongside SNL castmate Andy Samberg, and a recumbent biker in The Brothers Solomon starring Will Arnett and Will Forte.

Hader worked as a creative consultant, producer, and voice actor on South Park, beginning in the series' 12th season. His involvement in the series stems from his friendship with Matt Stone; the two held a similar sense of humor and Hader began going on writers' retreats with the staff. He began working on the program hoping to learn story structure. Hader is among the series producers to win the 2009 Emmy Award for Best Animated Series. He also appeared on the commentary recorded for the 2009 Blu-ray edition of South Park: Bigger, Longer and Uncut, and the Comedy Central special 6 Days to Air, a documentary filmed during production of the 2011 South Park episode "HumancentiPad". Hader rejoined the writing staff for South Park for its 17th season. Hader won a 2008 Peabody Award in Political Satire for his participation in Saturday Night Live. He also appeared on the MTV prank series Punk'd and voiced an array of characters on the second season of the Adult Swim animated series Xavier: Renegade Angel. He also made several short films, including Back in the Day, Sounds Good to Me: Remastering the Sting, and The Jeannie Tate Show, with SNL writer Liz Cackowski and then-wife Maggie Carey.

In 2008, Hader starred in, and cowrote with Simon Rich, the web series The Line on Crackle. Hader lent his voice to the audiobook of Sarah Vowell's The Wordy Shipmates. Also in 2008, Hader appeared on Tim and Eric Awesome Show impersonating the recurring character James Quall on the episode "Jazz". He appeared in two other Apatow projects: Forgetting Sarah Marshall and Pineapple Express. He also starred alongside Ben Stiller, Robert Downey Jr. and Tom Cruise in the action comedy Tropic Thunder. Hader re-teamed with Superbad director Greg Mottola in the comedy films Adventureland (2009) and Paul (2011). He lent his voice to his first video game role in Grand Theft Auto IV, which also featured his SNL castmates Jason Sudeikis and Fred Armisen.

Hader and SNL castmate Seth Meyers penned a Spider-Man one-off entitled The Short Halloween. It was illustrated by Kevin Maguire and came out May 29, 2009. It was given three and a half out of five stars by Benjamin Birdie of Comic Book Resources. He made a small appearance in the 2009 comedy film Year One, with Jack Black and Michael Cera. Hader lent his voice to the Sony Pictures Animation film Cloudy with a Chance of Meatballs, as well as its 2013 sequel, playing the lead role of Flint Lockwood as well as his invention in the films, the FLDSMDFR. He voiced a gazelle in Ice Age: Dawn of the Dinosaurs and appeared in the fantasy film Night at the Museum: Battle of the Smithsonian in 2009 as Major General George Armstrong Custer. In April 2009, Hader was a part of Vanity Fair's list of "Comedy's New Legends".

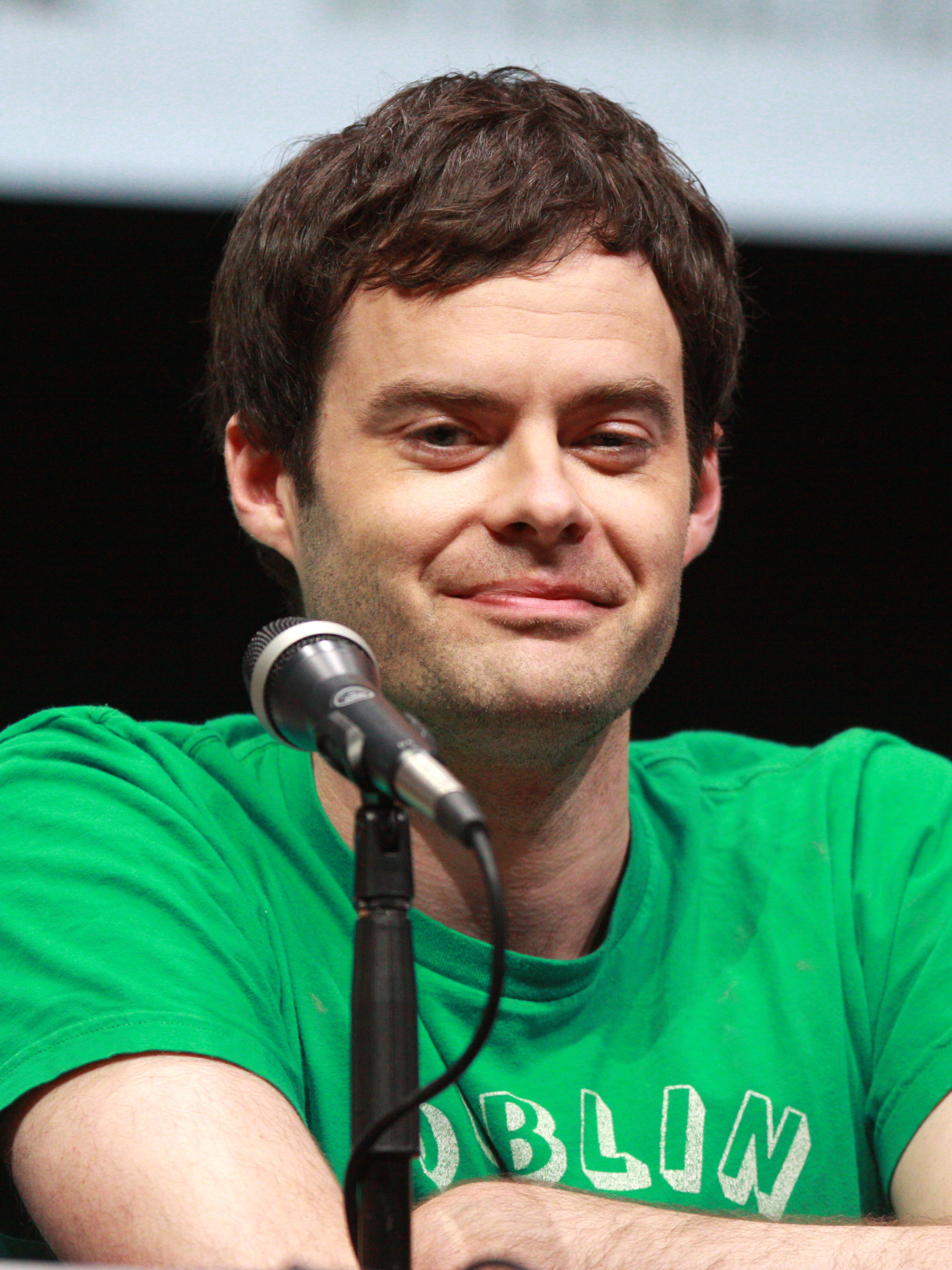
Hader at the 2013 San Diego Comic-Con

Hader took on the voice role of Professor Impossible on the fourth season of The Venture Brothers (2010–2013), a part originated by Stephen Colbert. He voiced the Pod in the Aqua Teen Hunger Force episode "IAMAPOD", as well as Hitler in the episode "Der Inflatable Fuhrer". Hader played Kevin, Matt Damon's copilot, in the live episode of 30 Rock, recorded October 14, 2010. He portrayed "The Voice" in the action-comedy film Scott Pilgrim vs. the World (2010), the disembodied voice that pops up during certain moments of the film's video game-inspired fight scenes. He also had a small cameo as the voice of the USS Vengeance computer in the science fiction film Star Trek Into Darkness (2013).

From 2011 to 2014, Hader hosted Essentials, Jr. on Turner Classic Movies. Hader received the gig after he was a guest programmer with host Robert Osborne who was impressed by Hader's eclectic choices, such as Billy Wilder's Five Graves to Cairo (1943), Robert Altman's Brewster McCloud (1970), and Akira Kurosawa's Rashomon (1950). TCM asked him if he would like to host its summer Essentials Jr. showcase that introduces younger audiences to seminal movies from the golden age of Hollywood and international cinema. He was chosen because Hader has a "certain energy and appeal to younger people. He is very passionate about the subject. He isn't just reading a teleprompter. He really cares and knows the movies." During the Essentials, Jr. program, Hader handpicked 13 films (one a week) to screen for the whole family each of those four years. The films he chose included Singin' in the Rain (1952), Bringing Up Baby (1938), The Band Wagon (1953), and The Lavender Hill Mob (1951) and King Kong (1933).

Hader was the guest star in the series premiere of the comedy series The Mindy Project, where he played as Mindy's ex-boyfriend Tom McDougall. His character returned later in the first season. Hader voiced Dr. Malocchio in the Hulu animated comedy series The Awesomes. In 2013, Hader replaced Robert Downey, Jr., as the voice of Mr. Peanut. Hader decided to leave SNL after eight seasons, informing cast and crew of his decision in February 2013. He came to the conclusion that he needed to leave when his then-wife and he were constantly having to travel to Los Angeles for work, which made it difficult for their children. His final episode was on May 18, 2013. "It was a hard decision, but it has to happen at some point," he told reporters. "It got to a point where I said, 'Maybe it's just time to go.'" On October 11, 2014, Hader returned as host with musical guest Hozier and on March 17, 2018, with musical guest Arcade Fire.

=== 2014–present: Film roles and Barry ===
Hader starred in a dramatic role in the 2014 film The Skeleton Twins, opposite Kristen Wiig, with whom he worked on Saturday Night Live. The film won for 'Best Screenplay' at the Sundance Film Festival. In 2015, Hader voiced the character of Fear in the Disney/Pixar film Inside Out, and was attached to voice a dinosaur in the Pixar film The Good Dinosaur. However, Hader, alongside John Lithgow, Lucas Neff, Neil Patrick Harris, and Judy Greer, left the project after their characters were redesigned. In 2015, Hader appeared in Brooklyn Nine-Nine as Captain Seth Dozerman of the 99th Precinct. Also in 2015, Hader reunited with fellow SNL alumni Fred Armisen and Seth Meyers for the IFC mockumentary series Documentary Now!, wherein he was an actor and a writer.

In December 2015, Drew McWeeny of HitFix reported that the voice of BB-8 in Star Wars: The Force Awakens was supplied by Hader and Ben Schwartz, both credited as "BB-8 vocal consultants" in the film. The voice was created by Abrams manipulating their voices through a talkbox, attached to an iPad running a sound-effects app. Hader also voiced multiple characters in YouTube channel Bad Lip Reading's parodies of the Star Wars original trilogy. Hader also played a minor supporting role in The Lonely Island's 2016 film Popstar: Never Stop Never Stopping, produced by Judd Apatow. Hader had his first leading man role in the romantic-comedy opposite Amy Schumer in Trainwreck (2015) and continued in these romantic roles as a former college boyfriend to best friend of Greta Gerwig's title character in Maggie's Plan (2015). Hader voiced Alpha 5 in the 2017 film version of Power Rangers.

In 2018, Hader co-created (with Alec Berg) and began starring in the HBO dark comedy series Barry, for which he received eight Primetime Emmy Award nominations as producer, writer, director, and actor. He won Emmys for Outstanding Lead Actor in a Comedy Series in both 2018 and 2019 and received consecutive nominations for Outstanding Comedy Series, Outstanding Directing for a Comedy Series and Outstanding Writing for a Comedy Series for its first two seasons. In 2019, Hader starred in the supernatural horror film It Chapter Two as Richie Tozier (sharing the role with Finn Wolfhard), alongside Jessica Chastain, Bill Skarsgård, Isaiah Mustafa, Jay Ryan, James Ransone, and James McAvoy. Hader received acclaim for his performance. In 2019, he voiced Leonard in The Angry Birds Movie 2, Axel the Carnie in Toy Story 4, The Wanderer in 4 episodes of The Dark Crystal: Age of Resistance, and played Nick Kringle in Noelle.

In June 2023, Hader was invited to become a member of The Academy of Motion Picture Arts and Sciences. That same year he had a cameo role as a UPS driver in the Ari Aster directed surrealist tragicomedy Beau is Afraid (2023) starring Joaquin Phoenix. Aster said of his casting, "We're friends. I was looking for a place to put him and [that] felt like the funniest, the most effective possible place. I love his performance in the film. It's a covert performance. A lot of people don't know that's him on the phone when they first see it. But it's a great performance." In March 2024, it was announced that Hader will star in the upcoming animated remake of the Dr. Seuss children's book The Cat in the Hat, in which he will voice the titular character and serve as an executive producer. The film will also star Quinta Brunson, Xochitl Gomez, and Bowen Yang. Hader and Mindy Kaling did not return to voice their roles as Fear and Disgust in Inside Out 2 reportedly due to pay disputes. Tony Hale and Liza Lapira replaced Hader and Kaling in taking over their respective roles.

On February 14, 2025, Hader declined an invitation to appear on the Saturday Night Live 50th Anniversary Special due to scheduling conflicts.

On April 13, 2026, Hader began production on his directorial debut They Know, a horror film which he also wrote and will star in. Since 2025, Hader has been working on a Jonestown series for HBO that he plans to co-write and direct.

== Influences ==
Hader has said that his comedy influences included Woody Allen, Monty Python, Alan Alda, Mel Brooks and Eddie Murphy.

== Personal life ==
=== Family ===
During an appearance on the PBS show, Finding Your Roots, airing on January 26, 2016, Hader found out he is the direct descendant of King Edward I of England and that Charlemagne is his 40th great-grandfather.

=== Marriage and relationships ===
Hader married writer and director Maggie Carey in 2006; they have three daughters. They divorced in 2018. Hader later dated actress Rachel Bilson (with whom he had co-starred in The To Do List, written and directed by Carey), and actress Anna Kendrick. From late 2022 to early 2026, he was in an on-and-off relationship with comedian and actress Ali Wong. In April 2025, Hader discussed how Wong supported him after the January 2025 Southern California wildfires made his home "unlivable". In January 2026, it was reported that Wong and Hader had amicably split, due to work schedules and family obligations.

=== Interests ===
Hader is an avid reader who has said that he "didn't really go to college, which is probably why [he] enjoy[s] reading the classics." He named works by Tobias Wolff, Fyodor Dostoevsky, William Faulkner, Richard Ford, George Saunders, and Jun'ichirō Tanizaki as influences. He is a fan of the Chicago Cubs. He is also an avid cinephile, enjoying films of the Golden Age of Hollywood as well as films directed by the Coen Brothers, Stanley Kubrick and Akira Kurosawa.

=== Health problems ===
Hader has an anxiety disorder. During his tenure on Saturday Night Live, he had anxiety and sleep problems. He never felt "truly comfortable" during his first four seasons. He worried that he had less comedy experience than his peers, would often not sleep on Fridays before the show, and felt lightheaded before broadcasts. He was neurotic about his performances, and he called his early appearances "rigid." During the final show of 2010, he began having a panic attack, live on air, while impersonating Julian Assange. He recalled: "It felt like someone was sitting on my chest. I couldn't breathe, I started sweating. I thought, This is not good—abort! abort!" Lorne Michaels tried to put him at ease after the incident by telling him, "You can work here as long as you want." Hader is prone to migraines. He also has a severe peanut allergy.
