= Kerry Weaver =

Fictional character

- Laura Innes as Kerry Weaver
- First appearance: September 21, 1995. (2x01, "Welcome Back Carter!")
- Last appearance: April 2, 2009. (15x22, "And In The End...")
- Portrayed by: Laura Innes
- Duration: 1995–2009

In-universe information
- Title(s): Chief Resident (1995–1996); Attending (1996–2007); Chief of Emergency Medicine (1999–2003); Chief of Staff (2003–2006)
- Occupation: Emergency Physician
- Family: Helen Kingsley (biological mother)
- Spouses: Sandy Lopez (Wife, deceased); Courtney Brown (girlfriend) Unnamed surgical resident (former husband)
- Children: Henry Lopez (son with Sandy); Unnamed child (miscarriage)

Kerry Weaver is a fictional character, a physician, in the NBC television series ER. Dr. Weaver first appears as a recurring character in the second-season episode "Welcome Back, Carter!", which aired on September 21, 1995. Dr. Weaver is portrayed by Laura Innes, who was promoted to the role of series regular beginning with the third-season episode "Dr. Carter, I Presume", which aired on September 26, 1996. Innes made her last regular appearance in the thirteenth-season episode "A House Divided", which aired on January 11, 2007.

During the series' fifteenth season, Innes made guest appearances in the episodes "Heal Thyself", which aired on November 13, 2008, and the series finale, "And in the End...", which aired on April 2, 2009.

Very little of Weaver’s background is revealed to the audience in her early episodes. The character exhibits a limp in her gait, which is aided by the use of a forearm crutch. This was later revealed to be caused by congenital hip dysplasia in episode 14 of season 11, in addition to the fact that she had lived for a period in Africa.

Weaver arrives at County General as Chief Resident, and later becomes an attending physician, is promoted to Chief of Emergency Medicine, and finally becomes the Hospital Chief of Staff. She is ambitious, craves authority, and tends to be excessively bureaucratic in her approach. Her administrative position often requires her to make unpleasant decisions that draw hostility from her fellow physicians, as when she fires Jeanie Boulet in Season 4. She also engages in administrative politics to protect herself, sometimes at the expense of others. Although an excellent physician, she is portrayed as the villain in many episodes. She is a dynamic character who struggles with which choice is the right one to make.

Although Weaver has been involved in some heterosexual relationships, she eventually comes out as a lesbian. Her sexual orientation is a key point in some episodes, particularly when she fights in court to keep her son, Henry. She was included in AfterEllen.com's Top 50 Lesbian and Bisexual Characters.

== Seasons two through six ==
During Innes' first five seasons on the show, little was revealed about the details of Weaver's background which would later become some of her defining traits: her sexual orientation, political beliefs, and even the precise nature of her disability. She kept her personal details largely private to prevent discrimination and protect her career. She was also unable to fully confront internalized homophobia and regretted that she never knew her birth parents.

When she was first hired by Mark Greene as chief resident in 1995 most ER staff (who disliked her pedantry, fixation on her own authority, and her tendency to micro-manage) were unhappy. Early in her position, she regularly clashed with Doug Ross and Susan Lewis. In addition, her obsession with bureaucratic policies irritated and confused the entire staff (in one episode, Jerry, the desk clerk, brought the staff a cake to celebrate her day off). In Season 3 Weaver became an ER attending physician alongside Greene, with whom she began to compete to curry favor with hospital leadership. As a result, Weaver was not understood beyond her career ambitions and bureaucratic obsessions.

Weaver began to show her underlying kindness and sensitivity when she supported Jeanie Boulet, a physician assistant who contracted HIV from her adulterous husband. Boulet fought to keep her job and dignity in the face of the liability of an HIV-positive employee in the ER. Weaver was the first person in a position of power to side with Boulet, and the two remained friends until Jeanie's budget-related firing and her successful PR pressure campaign to be reinstated. They later reconciled when Jeanie left the ER.

Weaver demonstrated compassion and a moral commitment to civil rights prompting her and Greene to draft a policy for HIV-positive employees. This storyline developed Weaver's character beyond that of a stoic, abrasive bureaucrat. In a future episode she agreed to look the other way when John Carter helped a teenage runaway escape her homophobic parents who sent her to a conversion therapy facility.

In 1997, Weaver had a brief relationship with Ellis West, an M.D. working for a company under consideration for a contract to take over management the ER. She eventually came to the conclusion that West had begun a relationship with her in order to gain her approval of the contract (West denied this and withdrew the proposal).

When Carter needed to find housing he answered an ad which led him to Weaver's house; she had been renting out her basement apartment to college students. The episode shows her as single and independent, living in an upscale home, and with a unique taste in music. Weaver also hired a private investigator to locate her birth mother, an effort that initially failed and revealed Weaver's fear that she was raised by adoptive parents because her mother could not accept a disabled daughter.

In 1998, during Season 4, Weaver suffered a debilitating convulsive seizure from the effects of toxic benzene spill in the ER. She was treated by Carter and Anna Del Amico. With Weaver debilitated and Greene out of town, Carter was forced to take charge of the ER for the first time.

Weaver was politically ambitious and regularly pursued higher administrative titles. She was named acting Chief of Emergency Medicine during David Morgenstern's extended absence. After an incident involving the hiring of a mentally-ill fraudulent doctor for the role, Weaver saw an opportunity to take the role permanently. However, she discovered the hospital wasn't seriously considering her for the position and immediately quit the interim chief role; Robert Romano immediately took the opportunity to replace her. At the start of Season 6, rumors spread that Romano was being considered for hospital Chief of Staff which both Weaver and Greene agreed to oppose. However, during a meeting in which Greene opposed Romano's promotion, Weaver decided to support Romano as a political maneuver and in return he awarded her the position of Chief of Emergency Medicine. Despite this, Weaver and Romano thereafter engaged in numerous power struggles.

In 1999, Weaver welcomed the chance to hire Gabe Lawrence, a famous ER physician who had been her mentor. After Lawrence makes several errors and displays odd behavior she initially refused to accept Greene's assertion that Lawrence was suffering from the early stages of Alzheimer's disease. But after investigating why he was fired from his prior role, then confronting Lawrence who admitted he had been diagnosed, she ultimately accepted it and fired him.

== Season seven ==
In mid-season, Weaver fell in love with staff psychiatrist Kim Legaspi (played by Elizabeth Mitchell), but was afraid to accept it. While Legaspi was openly lesbian and willing to pursue a romantic relationship with Weaver, she became frustrated that Weaver was closeted and homophobic, thus the relationship was rocky. When Weaver finally accepted that she was gay she was still uncomfortable about coming out to her coworkers. Despite this, the relationship was "open secret" among most of the people in the ER. This storyline also reveals that Weaver had been married to a surgical resident before working at County General.

The first coworker Weaver came out to was Dr. Robert Romano, who planned to fire Legaspi over trumped up allegations that she sexually harassed a patient. Weaver's statement prevented Romano from firing Legaspi, but it also emotionally drained Weaver, whose fears of discrimination ruining her career resurfaced. She was unable to provide emotional support to Legaspi, who kept her job, but at the cost of seeing the entrenched homophobia of the hospital administration and her own girlfriend, who remained in the closet. Legaspi broke up with Weaver and decided to take a job offer in San Francisco rather than face the administration's homophobia or the lack of support she received from Weaver.

Weaver also ran afoul of Elizabeth Corday in Season 7 when she assigned Mark Greene to a mandatory professional competency exam after brain tumor surgery resulted in personality changes. As a result, Weaver was not invited to Corday and Greene's wedding; her relationship with Corday was permanently strained thereafter.

== Season eight ==
Weaver was still officially closeted to everyone with the exceptions of Romano and Luka Kovač, and she was shocked when she asked Romano if he planned to out her and he said he would not (and surprisingly, he was true to his word). Weaver begins a new relationship with firefighter Lt. Sandy Lopez (played by Lisa Vidal) whom she met during a rainstorm while trying to rescue a pregnant woman from a crashed ambulance. Lopez eventually told Weaver she refused to date a woman who was in the closet. Lopez forcibly outed Weaver with a passionate kiss in front of the ER staff. The romance between the two women was portrayed with the courtship, passion and arguments typically reserved for heterosexual couples. Lopez said, "I did you a huge favor," after the kiss in the ER; a few episodes later, Weaver admitted to her that she was right. At the season's end, Weaver accepted herself as a lesbian, and became eager to oppose homophobia.

In Season Eight's second episode "The Longer You Stay", Weaver failed to answer repeated pages from Drs. Malucci and Chen when their patient had complications. Weaver was finally retrieved from Doc Magoo's by Carter who slips on wet pavement and injures his back in the process. After the patient died and she flatly said to the three "you killed him", she returns to Doc Magoo's and retrieves her pager which she had forgotten in a restroom stall. Desperate to cover up her irresponsibility when the hospital was sued by the patient's family, Weaver fired Malucci in the third episode "Blood, Sugar, Sex, Magic" on a charge of misconduct, and by the fourth episode "Never Say Never", scapegoated Malucci and Chen with the malpractice; Chen was offered a demotion from her Chief Resident position and instead quit entirely. Later in the season, Chen obtains proof of Weaver's dishonesty and brings it to Romano; he orders Weaver to rehire Chen as an attending physician and comply with her demands or face a reopened lawsuit from the dead patient's family.

In "Bygones", Weaver was stunned when she realized a lonely young woman murdered her roommate because of unrequited love. She then reconciled with Lopez and the two of them made their first social appearance at an impromptu drinking party after Mark Greene died. Weaver was visibly saddened by Greene's death and broke down after hearing the news of his passing. She later told Sandy she knew his demise was coming but never thought it would affect her as deeply as it did. She realized she had lost a friend and regretted the years they spent in competition for various ER posts and promotions.

== Season nine ==
Weaver and Lopez were still together and had on-going arguments about the future of their relationship. Weaver wanted to have a child, but after suffering a miscarriage felt Lopez should carry the child. Lopez, however, did not want to get pregnant, because it would impact her firefighting career. The couple did not get much screen time that season, and Weaver was given another story thread about the consequences she faced when she failed to report a local politician who tested positive for syphilis; Alderman Johnathan Bright (Bruce Weitz) provided funding for County and a plum position for Kerry, but forced her to do an off-the-record treatment of his closeted gay lover that ended with the lover's accidental death from an allergic reaction to penicillin. Later, Dr. Anspaugh became fed up with Dr. Romano's attitude and neglect on the job. Anspaugh offered to lighten Romano's work load by sharing his administrative duties with Kerry Weaver. When Romano refused this, he was replaced with a somewhat surprised Weaver, who offered Romano a choice of becoming a staff teacher, running the ER, or being fired. Romano took on the ER job and was awful at it, with Kerry not showing much sympathy when Dr. Carter correctly told her that Romano was a dangerous liability in that position (perhaps not accidentally, Carter went off to Africa not long after Romano took over and didn't fully return until after Romano's death in Season 10).

== Season ten ==
Kerry settled into her chief administrative position but ran into various challenges that arose day by day from hospital staffing to the ER's hectic renovation. These obstacles included her constant run-ins with Dr. Romano, whom at one point she threatens to fire. When he was killed in a helicopter accident, Kerry, like many others, was not saddened, though she acknowledged that his presence was an important contribution to the hospital. Later in early 2004, Weaver dedicated a Center of LGBT healthcare in the memory of Romano, which secretly served as post-mortem payback, since Romano was not a supporter of gay rights. In her personal life, Lopez changed her mind about having a baby and gave birth to baby Henry in the hospital. Later on in the season, however, Lopez died from injuries she suffered while fighting a fire; Kerry was devastated by the loss. Abby Lockhart and (surprisingly) Elizabeth Corday were particularly supportive towards her following this tragedy. Lopez's parents (who had never approved of her sexual orientation) took custody of Henry and for the remainder of the season, Weaver's storyline focused on a child custody battle between herself and Lopez's parents. The custody situation was eventually settled when the Lopezes and Weaver agreed to her having primary custody, with the Lopezes taking care of Henry while Kerry was at work.

== Season eleven ==
In the 2005 episode titled "Just As I Am," Weaver finally met her biological mother, Helen Kingsley, who turned out to be a conservative Christian, originally from Myrtle Beach, South Carolina and currently living in Terre Haute, Indiana. Kingsley (Frances Fisher) explained to Weaver that, as an unmarried, teenage mother with limited options for raising a child, she gave Weaver up for adoption when she was 14 days old in hopes of her having a better life. She was in town for a Christ Crusade and decided to meet her daughter since Kerry's biological father, Cody Boone, had recently died. When Kingsley learned her daughter was a lesbian, she and Weaver clashed over faith and sexuality, with Weaver insisting that her mother love and accept her. Kingsley said she could love her daughter, but because she could not accept homosexuality as moral, she could not accept her daughter. This episode not only ended the mystery behind Weaver's mother, it also revealed for the first time the reason for Weaver's crutch: Helen inquired about Weaver's limp, and Weaver explained that she suffered from congenital hip dysplasia, a birth defect. Weaver was surprised to learn that Helen knew nothing about it, and her long-held fear that the birth defect was the reason she was given up for adoption was resolved.

Aside from this episode, Kerry Weaver almost exclusively played supporting roles and was frequently absent from entire episodes. A negative contribution was that she played a major role in forcing Elizabeth Corday to leave County, though Corday deliberately provoked her into doing so because she could not work with Lucien Dubenko, a new surgeon that Weaver had hired. She also got angry when Susan Lewis complained about being denied a tenured position, stating that Susan's complete lack of grant earning was a major factor.

== Season twelve ==
Kerry continued to play the background in most of the episodes this season. Even though she stayed very busy with her administrative meetings and tasks, Kerry occasionally took shifts in the ER to keep her emergency skills sharp. Kerry kept putting off hip surgery even though the pain had begun impacting her ability to provide care, but in the episode "Out on a Limb" Kerry did undergo the surgery to fix her hip dysplasia. In the episode "No Place To Hide," Kerry walked for the first time on the series without the aid of her forearm crutch. Kerry asked Abby (who was expecting a child with Luka) to be Henry's legal guardian in the event that something happened to her, but her surgery was entirely successful. This storyline was done in part because Laura Innes really was starting to develop hip and back problems after ten years of walking with a fake limp and using a crutch for the sake of her role. Laura Innes described this arc as the character "shedding some of her hardness and moving on in her life."

At the end of the season, Kerry faced criticism for hiring Dr. Victor Clemente (John Leguizamo) as an attending physician, after he was fired for his onscreen mental health breakdown and a case of medical incompetence that was never shown or fully explained. Despite being responsible for hiring him (and for refusing Luka's efforts to have Clemente fired long before the issues that did lead to his dismissal), Kerry tried to divert the fire towards Dr. Luka Kovač (Goran Visnjic), the Chief of Emergency Medicine, risking his job as a result.

== Season thirteen ==
After saving Luka and Abby in the season premiere, Kerry realized that her constant attempts to protect her career had turned her into the kind of lying opportunist she'd always hated; she stopped the County Executive Board from firing Luka by solemnly confirming that she'd ignored or blocked Luka's efforts to get rid of Clemente and lied about it to save her skin. She was demoted from Chief of Staff as a result and was back to being an attending physician. Though she clearly struggled to adjust to her new position, especially with Luka being her new boss (though he wasn't angry at her after she told the truth), Kerry was pleased to practice medicine full-time again; she also developed a more friendly relationship with Greg Pratt.

Working back in the ER, Weaver caught the eye of a TV producer filming a news segment with Dr. Morris and literally steals the show. She's offered a job by the executives for news reporting. Shortly afterwards, Kerry and her producer Courtney (Michelle Hurd) developed a close relationship, one Kerry had not felt since her partner Sandy Lopez died. Courtney told Kerry how her great news broadcasting could open a successful career for her. Kerry decided to leave County General when ER chief Luka Kovač was forced to cut $200,000 from the ER budget and the only position that afforded that was Kerry's. Kerry accepted a television show offer at WTVJ in Miami, despite Kovač's last-minute efforts to convince her to stay.

Kerry Weaver's last regular appearance on ER was in the Season 13 episode called "A House Divided" Episode 280 in which Abby Lockhart expressed to Dr. Weaver that if it had not been for her, she'd never have become a doctor or a mother; she and Kerry shared a tearful farewell moment. As Kerry packed up and walked out of County General's doors for the last time, she only asked Luka to take care of the place for her and advised him not to make her mistake of getting involved in hospital politics, indicating that they were on good terms and sealing that with a warm farewell hug. Luka took her advice and stepped down as Chief towards the end of the season, just before he married Abby. Laura Innes' last appearance as a series regular on the show was on January 11, 2007. Following her departure from the program, NBC received some pressure from GLAAD to introduce more LGBT characters.

== Return to the series in the fifteenth season and the end ==
Weaver appeared in a flashback sequence in the Season 15 episode titled "Heal Thyself", which was set back in 2002, just months before Greene's death. In her scene, she walked into Trauma 1 and expressed how worried she was about Dr. Mark Greene, because of his treatment for brain cancer. She told him to step down and take a break from treating Catherine Banfield's son. After he refused, Dr. Weaver reluctantly left the room.

At the end of the Season 15 episode "The Book of Abby," long-serving nurse Haleh Adams showed the departing Abby Lockhart a closet wall where all the past doctors and employees had put their locker name tags. Among them, the tag "Weaver" was seen.

During Season 15 episode 19, former co-worker Dr. Doug Ross asked both Sam Taggart and Neela Rasgotra about Weaver (as he found out that they were from County), curious if she was still working there.

In the series finale, she flew from Florida to attend the dedication and opening of the Carter Center. She met up with Elizabeth Corday, Susan Lewis, John Carter, and Peter Benton after Carter's opening. The old colleagues went out to eat at an old tavern and catch up with each other. At the end of the night, she then told the group that she couldn't stay any longer, as she needed to catch a flight back to Florida. Kerry gave everyone a hug and left Chicago.

== Positions held at County General ==
Other offices
Preceded by Mark Greene	Chief Resident; 1995–1996	Succeeded by Linda Martin (mentioned, unseen)
Preceded by Robert Romano (Acting Chief)	Chief of Emergency Medicine; 1999–2003	Succeeded by Robert Romano
Preceded by Robert Romano	Chief of Staff; 2003–2006	Succeeded by Donald Anspaugh
