= Return (2011 film) =

2011 American film

- Theatrical poster
- Directed by: Liza Johnson
- Written by: Liza Johnson
- Produced by: Noah Harlan; Ben Howe
- Starring: Linda Cardellini; Michael Shannon; John Slattery
- Cinematography: Anne Etheridge
- Edited by: Paul Zucker
- Music by: T. Griffin; Joe Rudge
- Production companies: 2.1 Films; True Enough Productions; Fork Films
- Distributed by: Focus World; Dada Films
- Release date: May 14, 2011 (Cannes)
- Running time: 98 minutes
- Country: United States
- Language: English
- Box office: $17,953

Return is a 2011 independent film about an American reservist, wife and mother returning home from her tour of duty in the Middle East. The film was written and directed by Liza Johnson, and stars Linda Cardellini, Michael Shannon and John Slattery. It is Johnson's first feature-length film, and received good reviews at its premiere at the Cannes Film Festival Directors' Fortnight. Linda Cardellini was nominated for an Independent Spirit Award for Best Female Lead for her performance in the film.

== Synopsis ==
Kelli, returning from her military tour of duty in the Middle East, has high hopes for resuming her old life in her midwestern hometown. Her hopes are gradually dashed as her relationships with her family and friends suffer; they have moved on, and she cannot adjust. She is unable to provide the attention her children need, she quits her dull factory job, she discovers her husband Mike's (Shannon) infidelity, drinks with her friends, then is stopped by the police while driving under the influence. During her court-ordered therapy session, she meets Bud (Slattery), a charming war veteran. She undergoes a gradual breakdown, but persists in her efforts to reestablish her life.

== Cast ==
- Linda Cardellini as Kelli
- Michael Shannon as Mike
- John Slattery as Bud
- Talia Balsam as Julie
- Emma Rayne Lyle as Jackie
- Paul Sparks as Ed
- Rosie Benton as Brooke
- Louisa Krause as Shannon
- James Murtaugh as Mr. Miller
- Bonnie Swencionis as Cara Lee
- Wayne Pyle as Franklin

== Production ==
Johnson explained that her impetus to start the project came from "talking to my male friend about his experiences. It was through talking with him about his divorce and stuff, that was sort of my first point of interest. He introduced me to a lot of his colleagues. Through him and through other means, I did meet a lot of women soldiers. We did a lot of research with women who have been deployed. Linda [Cardellini] did her own research in L.A. at the VA hospital, through other contacts and friends."

Johnson was selected to attend the 2008 Sundance Institute Feature Film Program, where some scenes for Return were workshopped. The film project was also selected for the International Film Festival Rotterdam CineMart in 2008, which connects filmmakers with co-production and film marketers. Following the Sundance Lab program, she was awarded the Adrienne Shelly Women Filmmakers Grant for production of Return, and in 2010 received a grant from film philanthropic group Cinereach.

In 2010, Johnson said, "Over the summer, we decided to move the production upstate [New York] in Newburgh, Beacon and New Windsor. That area reminds me a lot of the town where I grew up, an Ohio river town that has been greatly affected by the economy." "On our last day of the shoot in Newburgh, a water main broke and the water started coming out brown. We looked around and it seemed like a sign that we shot in the right place." The film was shot in Super 16, distributed in DCP. The film was executive produced by Abigail Disney, Meredith Vieira and Amy Rapp, and was the first feature film production for Meredith Vieira Productions.

== Release ==
Focus Features' digital film distribution division Focus World announced in December 2011 that it would be releasing Return at the end of February 2012 on a variety of digital media.

== Release and reception ==
Return was the sole U.S. film selected for the 25-film 2011 Cannes Film Festival Directors' Fortnight. Following its premiere at the festival, The Boston Globe reviewer Wesley Morris wrote, "I like Johnson's delicacy and discretion. She trusts Cardellini's natural, easygoing performance to show us what goes untold. The movie is modest, too, and its small emotional scale works. Without asking for pity or outrage, it's another movie about the unaccountable, unending drain of war."

On review aggregator Rotten Tomatoes, the film holds an approval rating of 83% based on 41 reviews, with an average rating of 6.53/10. The website's critics consensus reads: "Powered by a compelling central performance by Linda Cardellini, Return offers a painfully compelling look at the emotional struggles faced by war veterans." On Metacritic, the film has a weighted average score of 63 out of 100, based on twelve critics, indicating "generally favorable reviews".

The Hollywood Reporter reviewer Todd McCarthy stated, "Return has quiet virtues and the distinction of focusing closely on one particular woman’s difficulty readjusting to being a wife and mother." Noting Cardellini's appearance in nearly every scene, the review continued, "she delivers by keeping you interested no matter how mundane the activity Kelli is performing. It’s a wholehearted performance". He noted Slattery's "amusing change-of-pace role", that Shannon "plays it absolutely straight for once", and credited Anne Etheridge's "mobile cinematography" with maintaining "a watchful air of intimacy."

Mark Adams (ScreenDaily.com) called the film "thoughtful and gently powerful", "subtle and simply told", noting that it "eschews the usual dramatic cues of the 'soldier back home' story", and called Cardellini's performance "terrific", "generating a real sense of warmth and affection but also a slight unease and distrust in those around her." He found Shannon's performance "equally impressive"; "his sheer presence and subtle performance bolsters Cardellini’s performance, making what on screen is a minor role seem more substantial." The review in Variety called the film "amiable, stylish, low-key", Cardellini's performance as "wholly credible", and Slattery's portrayal of Bud as a "welcome jolt of energy and humor", though director Johnson "takes audience interest rather too much for granted in the pic's first half."

Five reviewers for IndieWire gave the film grades of B+, B-, B+, B, and B. The review aggregator Metacritic score is 63/100, based on 12 reviews.
