= They Know =

Upcoming film by Bill Hader

- Directed by: Bill Hader
- Screenplay by: Bill Hader
- Story by: Bill Hader; Duffy Boudreau
- Produced by: Bill Hader; Robert Graf; Alyssa Donovan
- Starring: Bill Hader; Linda Cardellini; Lilou Lang; Lorelei Olivia Mote
- Cinematography: Carl Herse
- Edited by: Ali Greer
- Music by: David Wingo
- Production companies: MRC; Hanarply
- Distributed by: Black Bear Pictures
- Country: United States
- Language: English

They Know is an upcoming American psychological horror film written by, directed by, and starring Bill Hader in his feature directorial debut. The film, based on an original story by Hader and Duffy Boudreau, follows a divorced father as he becomes paranoid that his daughters are being influenced by his ex-wife's boyfriend.

== Premise ==
A divorced father (Hader) grows suspicious that a mysterious man dating his ex-wife (Cardellini) is having a strange influence on their daughters (Lang and Mote).

== Cast ==
- Bill Hader
- Linda Cardellini
- Lilou Lang
- Lorelei Olivia Mote

== Background ==
The film is based on an original story that Hader had conceived with longtime collaborator Duffy Boudreau. According to Hader, the concept arose out of a conversation around their respective divorces, as both Hader and Boudreau were on good terms with their ex-wives and started talking about the "worst case scenarios" of divorce.

Hader initially wrote the script, which was described by Ari Aster as being "incredibly personal", after wrapping the final season of Barry. Hader struggled to find financing due to the "disturbing" and "cynical" nature of the script, and briefly shelved the project. He revealed that he was inspired to return to the project after watching Aster's 2025 film Eddington as well as Kiyoshi Kurosawa's Cloud.

== Production ==
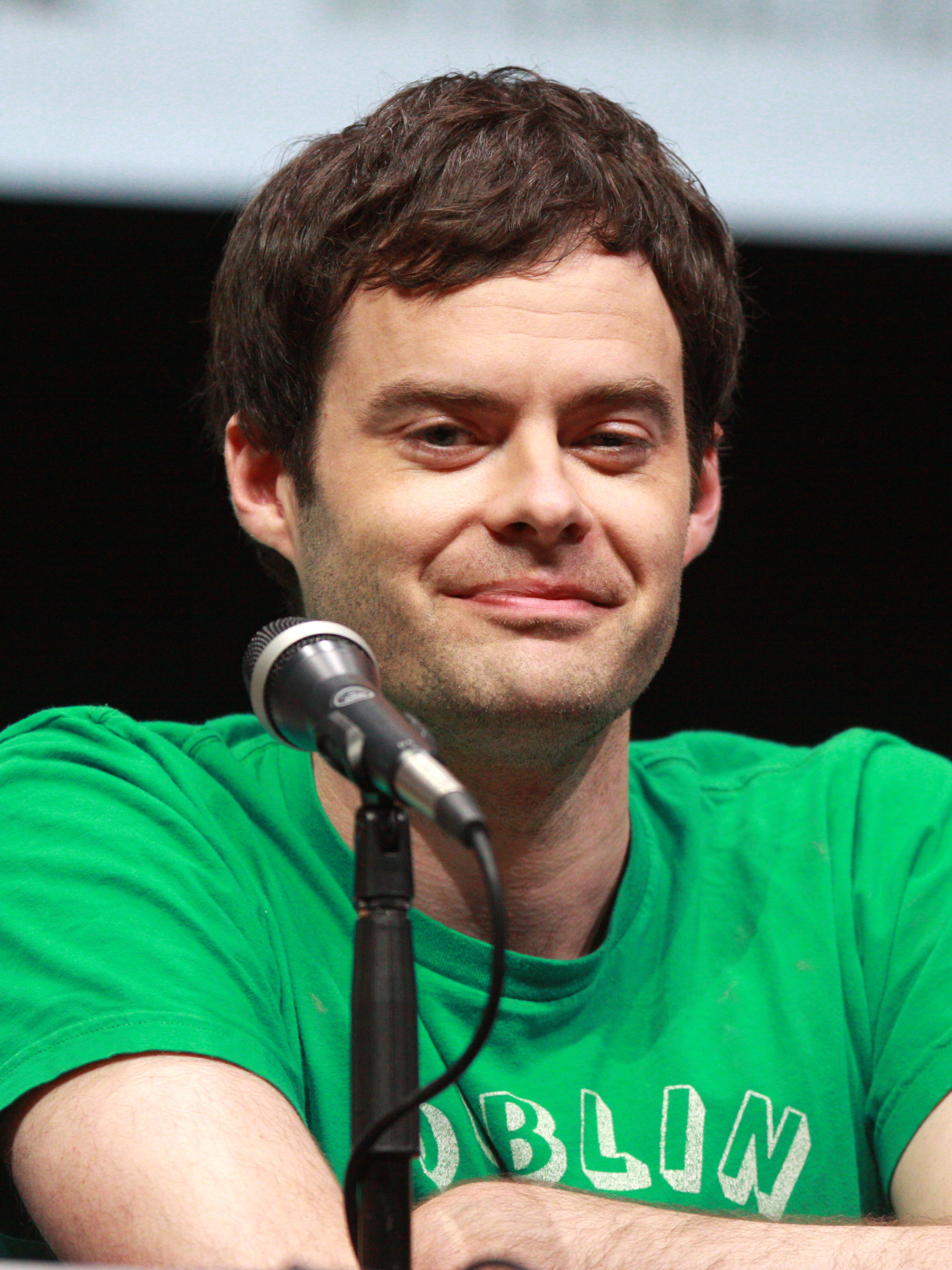
Hader had previously directed 18 episodes of the HBO crime tragicomedy series Barry, which he co-created and starred in.

The film was financed by MRC. Hader and Robert Graf serve as producers under Hader's Hanarply banner, with Alyssa Donovan serving as co-producer.

Production began in Los Angeles on April 13, 2026, where it was announced that Linda Cardellini would be joining the cast as the ex-wife of Hader's character. On April 28, 2026, Lilou Lang and Lorelei Olivia Mote were announced to be joining the cast, playing the daughters of Hader's character. Principal photography concluded that May, and Hader revealed in October that the film was in the sound-mixing stage and was being prepared to show to potential distributors. In November, Black Bear Pictures acquired North American distribution rights to the film.
