= JAG season 10 =

JAG
- Season 10
- Starring: David James Elliott; Catherine Bell; Patrick Labyorteaux; Scott Lawrence; Zoe McLellan
- No. of episodes: 22

Release
- Original network: CBS
- Original release: September 24, 2004 – April 29, 2005

Season chronology
- ← Previous; Season 9

The tenth and final season of JAG premiered on CBS on September 24, 2004, and concluded on April 29, 2005. The season, starring David James Elliott and Catherine Bell, was produced by Belisarius Productions in association with Paramount Network Television.

Season 10 of JAG aired alongside the second season of NCIS.

== Plot ==
Chief of Staff Lieutenant Colonel Sarah "Mac" MacKenzie (Catherine Bell), a tenacious, by-the-book Marine Corps judge advocate, and Commander Harmon "Harm" Rabb, Jr. (David James Elliott), a former naval aviator turned lawyer, are employed by Headquarters of the Judge Advocate General, the internal law firm of the Department of the Navy. The JAG team prosecute, defend, and preside over the legal cases under the Uniform Code of Military Justice (UCMJ) assigned to them by the Judge Advocate General, Major General Gordon Cresswell (David Andrews). This season, Mac and Harm must investigate the death of a Marine in a friendly fire incident ("Corporate Raiders"), a 22-year-old murder case ("Retrial"), an Ensign who fired on a fishing boat ("Whole New Ball Game"), and a DOD mishap in Baghdad ("This Just in from Baghdad"). Also this season, Mac suffers a personal loss ("Hail and Farewell"), and travels to San Diego to head a criminal investigation ("JAG: San Diego"), while new officers Lieutenants Gregory Vukovic (Chris Beetem), Tali Mayfield (Meta Golding), and Catherine Graves (Jordana Spiro) are assigned to her staff, Jennifer Coates (Zoe McLellan) is tapped to be a juror ("The Sixth Juror"), Harm must face the loss of Mattie (Hallee Hirsh) ("Death at the Mosque"), Bud Roberts (Patrick Labyorteaux) and Harriet Sims (Karri Turner) must decide their future, and Sturgis Turner (Scott Lawrence) is forced to act as the Acting Judge Advocate General. Finally, Harm and Mac must confront their feelings for one-another as they are offered promotions that will lead to their separation, Mac is assigned to Joint Legal Forces Southwest, and Harm is offered a Captain's billet in London ("Fair Winds and Following Seas").

== Production ==
In February 2005, series co-star David James Elliott announced his departure from the series, with Bellisario noting that "his contract was up, and we never expected it to go on. We had to cut costs. [So] we started doing episodes with less of David, and it became obvious to him that we were not going to renegotiate". Both Catherine Bell and Chris Beetem had signed on for a potential eleventh season. "'It was always intended that Catherine would be [on] the show next season but [Elliott] would not,' says Bellisario".

In Spring 2005, despite CBS informing Donald P. Bellisario that the series "may get picked up", JAG was cancelled. Bellisario stated that "the reason JAG is not coming back is purely demographic. Nothing more", adding "it's wrong to say the show was canceled because [series co-star David James Elliott] said he was leaving".

== Cast and characters ==
=== Main ===
- David James Elliott as Harmon Rabb, Jr., Commander/Captain
- Catherine Bell as Sarah MacKenzie, Lieutenant Colonel in the Marine Corps.
- Patrick Labyorteaux as Bud Roberts, Lieutenant Commander
- Scott Lawrence as Sturgis Turner, Commander
- Zoe McLellan as Jennifer Coates, Legalman 1st Class (Petty Officer 1st Class)

=== Also starring ===
- Karri Turner as Harriet Sims, Lieutenant
- Chris Beetem as Gregory Vukovic, Lieutenant
- David Andrews as Gordon Cresswell, Major General in the Marine Corps, Judge Advocate General of the Navy
- Meta Golding as Tali Mayfield, Lieutenant
- Jordana Spiro as Catherine Graves, Lieutenant

=== Recurring ===
- Steven Culp as Clayton Webb, CIA Officer
- Claudette Nevins as Porter Webb, mother of Clayton Webb
- Michael Bellisario as Michael Roberts, Midshipman
- Dean Stockwell as Edward Sheffield, Secretary of the Navy
- Hallee Hirsh as Mattie Grace Johnson

== Episodes ==
No. overall	No. in season	Title	Directed by	Written by	Original release date	Prod. code	US viewers (millions)
206	1	"Hail and Farewell, Part II"	Terrence O'Hara	Stephen Zito	September 24, 2004	207	9.95
Part 2 of 2 : Following the retirement of Rear Admiral A.J. Chegwidden and other events in "Hail and Farewell, Part I," Sturgis is named Acting JAG. Harm researches endometriosis to try to help Mac overcome her medical condition. Mac is unable to accept that Clayton Webb is dead and investigates the circumstances surrounding his death. Mac and Harm track Webb to his family's beachfront house and discover that undercover MI6 agent Simon Tanveer (Note: Ed Quinn as Simon Tanveer) is a deadly assassin known only as "The Hawk". Mac finally breaks up with Webb for good, unwilling to live with the lies of their relationship.
207	2	"Corporate Raiders"	Bradford May	Don McGill	October 1, 2004	208	9.28
Harm and Mac investigate when a private military contractor is implicated in the death of a Marine in a "friendly fire" accident and are shocked to find out he's the formerly honorable Captain (from "Collision Course").
208	3	"Retrial"	Jeannot Szwarc	Larry Moskowitz	October 15, 2004	210	10.36
Harm reopens a 22-year-old murder case after discovering evidence of not only prosecutorial misbehavior but also evidence proving the innocence of the defendant, who was a young seaman at the time of the occurrence. Mac and Bud deal with a chief warrant officer with four wives and families.
209	4	"Whole New Ball Game"	Terrence O'Hara	Darcy Meyers	October 29, 2004	209	9.37
Gordon Cresswell, a Marine colonel working as legal counsel to the Chairman of the Joint Chiefs of Staff, is the first pick of Secretary of the Navy Edward Sheffield to become the new JAG. Harm and Mac deal with a Navy Ensign accused of firing on a Canadian fishing boat.
210	5	"This Just In from Baghdad"	Bradford May	Philip DeGuere, Jr.	November 5, 2004	211	9.63
Major General Gordon Cresswell is appointed the new Judge Advocate General of the Navy. Harm and Mac head to Baghdad to investigate the circumstances surrounding the death of a U.S. Department of Defense official.
211	6	"One Big Boat"	Kenneth Johnson	Dana Coen	November 12, 2004	212	10.41
A midshipman on the United States Naval Academy sailing team is swept overboard during a storm and questions arise about whether the team's commander was negligent in making the team sail through the weather.
212	7	"Camp Delta"	Oz Scott	Larry Moskowitz	November 19, 2004	214	9.85
Harm defends Army MPs stationed at Guantanamo Bay who have injured a fellow soldier during an exercise involving detainees who resist. Bud has an altercation with an anti-war civilian, and General Cresswell orders him to take an anger management course.
213	8	"There Goes the Neighborhood"	David James Elliott	Darcy Meyers	November 26, 2004	213	10.21
Pia Bonfilio, (Note: Alex Breckenridge as Pia Bonfilio) a friend from Petty Officer Jennifer Coates' criminal past, makes her new Navy life difficult. Bud defends a naval aviator who gave her father lessons in an F-18 that he purchased.
214	9	"The Man on the Bridge"	Vern Gillum	Don McGill	December 10, 2004	215	10.67
A Navy Commander assigned to the Bio-Weapons Defense Laboratory goes missing and Harm and Mac must work with the FBI to find him. Bud is asked to intervene when a female Marine wants to participate in the Corps boxing competition.
215	10	"The Four Percent Solution"	Dennis Smith	Dana Coen	December 17, 2004	206	9.03
Mac is knocked unconscious in an auto accident on Christmas Eve and we see her meetings with her therapist Lieutenant Commander Vera McCool (Note: Barbara Eve Harris as Lt. Cmdr. Vera McCool) along with flashbacks of her life at JAG HQ. The episode is followed by video featuring: Holiday greetings from our troups in Iraq. Air Force Co-Ordination Element; Marine Corps Security Company; Second Platoon Gulf Company; Joint Area Support; Weapons Company Fifth Platoon; Central Criminal Court Security; Multi-National Force PSD Team; Multi-National Force Iraq; 143rd Area Support Group; Marine Security Force Baghdad. And JAG wishes you a peaceful, happy holiday.
216	11	"Automatic for the People"	Kenneth Johnson	Story by : Philip DeGuere, Jr. & Darcy Meyers; Teleplay by : Philip DeGuere, Jr.	January 7, 2005	216	10.58
An F-14 Tomcat testing a joint U.S.-Israeli anti-missile system crashes near an elementary school in California and Harm must deal with an eager junior officer as well as local tensions. Bud's anger management class doesn't go well when a fight breaks out.
217	12	"The Sixth Juror"	Bradford May	Paul Levine	January 14, 2005	219	9.95
When a murder investigation on a small Navy base depletes the jury pool, Petty Officer Jennifer Coates is forced to serve as the sixth and final juror.
218	13	"Heart of Darkness"	Bradford May	Paul Levine	February 4, 2005	217	10.10
Harm and Mac are sent to Afghanistan to seek out Marine Captain Jack Ramsey (Note: Michael Rooker as Captain Jack Ramsey) who has gone native to find Osama bin Laden and is accused of murdering civilians. Bud is asked by his retired father Big Bud Roberts (Note: Jeff MacKay as Big Bud Roberts) to help him avoid military service when he is recalled to active duty.
219	14	"Fit for Duty"	Randy D. Wiles	Don McGill & Darcy Meyers	February 11, 2005	218	9.25
A Navy psychiatrist is accused of malpractice by letting a Marine under her care who had severe PTSD return to the front lines, where he died in combat. Bud defends a Navy captain who refused to vacate his command after his ship hit a pier.
220	15	"Bridging the Gulf"	Dennis Smith	Larry Moskowitz	February 18, 2005	220	9.51
Harm is back under the microscope when he shoots down a civilian aircraft that had crossed into a no-fly zone. Lieutenant Gregory Vukovic joins the JAG team and immediately rubs Mac the wrong way.
221	16	"Straits of Malacca"	Richard Compton	Darcy Meyers	February 25, 2005	221	10.30
Mac and Vukovic are sent to the Straits of Malacca in order to deal with a confrontation between a US Navy vessel and a ship seized by modern-day pirates. Bud and Harriet hold a party celebrating the birth of their twins.
222	17	"JAG: San Diego"	Vern Gillum	Story by : Larry Moskowitz; Teleplay by : Don McGill & Larry Moskowitz	March 11, 2005	222	8.98
General Cresswell changes the location of the annual JAG conference to San Diego. Mac and Vukovic investigate an incident involving victims of a hurricane who clashed with Marines delivering relief supplies in Nicaragua. Harm must deal with a personal situation when Mattie is critically injured in an accident. (Note: This was a backdoor pilot for potential spin-off or reformat starring Catherine Bell, Chris Beetem, Meta Golding and Jordana Spiro as their respective characters and based around a JAG office in San Diego (as David James Elliott would leave JAG after its 10th season anyway). Nevertheless, CBS did not pick it up for their 2005-2006 schedule.)
223	18	"Death at the Mosque"	Bradford May	Stephen Zito	April 1, 2005	223	9.01
Harm keeps a bedside vigil over Mattie, while Vukovic is sent to Iraq to defend a Marine who killed an allegedly unarmed Iraqi in full view of a reporter. General Cresswell asks Mac to convince his daughter, Cameron "Cammie" Cresswell, (Note: Danneel Harris as Cameron "Cammie" Cresswell) not to abandon a military career.
224	19	"Two Towns"	Kenneth Johnson	Dana Coen	April 8, 2005	224	9.02
Mac goes to Iraq to investigate a bombing that killed a squad of Marine reservists. Harm and Bud go to Oklahoma to help a small town cope with the devastating loss. Things are complicated when the unit's sole survivor is accused of firebombing the Marine Reserve Center.
225	20	"Unknown Soldier"	Mike Vejar	Story by : Joseph C. Wilson; Teleplay by : Aurorae Khoo & Stephen Lyons	April 15, 2005	225	9.25
General Cresswell's brother believes the remains of an unidentified service member from the Vietnam War are those of a pilot who saved his life, so Vukovic and Lt. Catherine Graves are sent to find a relative for a DNA test.
226	21	"Dream Team"	Vern Gillum	Larry Moskowitz & Don McGill	April 22, 2005	226	10.24
Harm and Vukovic defend a sailor accused of manslaughter because of a shipboard fight. Mac defends a Navy sailor who set several dolphins free. At the end of the episode General Cresswell announces a change that affects the entire staff with Harm being sent to London and Mac to San Diego. At the very end, Harm is frocked to the grade of Captain.
227	22	"Fair Winds and Following Seas"	Bradford May	Stephen Zito	April 29, 2005	227	13.98
With Harm being sent to London and Mac to San Diego, they must sort out their personal feelings quickly. Bud must decide what he will do with his career when both Harm and Mac separately offer him to come with each of them to their new prospective duty stations (Vukovic, however, is told by Mac she does not want him on her staff). Vukovic is tasked to act as a diplomat when an overeager teenager enlists in the Marines to avenge his father's death in Afghanistan, mindful of advice from General Cresswell that the culture of the Marine Corps is different. The episode ends on a military JAG coin flip tossed by Bud Roberts, to decide whether Mac or Harm will resign their commission to be together. (Note: The actual result of the flip is not depicted onscreen. Mac eventually reveals in the tenth season finale of NCIS: Los Angeles that Harm lost the coin flip and therefore resigned his commission to join her in San Diego, before separating to become the executive officer (XO) of the fictional USS Allegiance.)

== See also ==
- 2004–2005 United States network television schedule
- NCIS (franchise)
