= JAG season 9 =

Season of television series

JAG
- Season 9
- Starring: David James Elliott; Catherine Bell; Patrick Labyorteaux; John M. Jackson
- No. of episodes: 23

Release
- Original network: CBS
- Original release: September 26, 2003 – May 21, 2004

Season chronology
- ← Previous; Season 8 Next → Season 10

The ninth season of JAG premiered on CBS on September 26, 2003, and concluded on May 21, 2004. The season, starring David James Elliott and Catherine Bell, was produced by Belisarius Productions in association with Paramount Television.

Season 9 of JAG aired alongside the first season of NCIS.

== Plot ==
Commander Harmon "Harm" Rabb, Jr. (David James Elliott) and Lieutenant Colonel Sarah "Mac" MacKenzie (Catherine Bell) are lawyers assigned to the Headquarters of the Judge Advocate General, the internal law firm of the Department of the Navy. Mac, a seasoned Marine and JAG's Chief of Staff, is a lawyer-by-trade, while Harm, a former Tomcat pilot, turned to law following a crash at sea. Together, they investigate numerous cases, including espionage ("A Tangled Webb"), a death in combat ("The One That Got Away"), an Islamic conversion at sea ("Touchdown"), the death of an Iraqi prisoner ("The Boast"), and a Quaker who feels the Navy contradicts his fundamental religious beliefs ("Posse Comitatus"). Also this season, Harm departs JAG ("Shifting Sands") and is recruited by the CIA ("Secret Agent Man"), Commander Carolyn Imes (Dana Sparks) reveals she has faked her legal credentials ("Back in the Saddle"), the Secretary of the Navy (Dean Stockwell) is held accountable for deaths of foreign soil ("People v. SecNav"), the team reflect on what could have been ("What If?"), Mac must track down seized heroin ("Trojan Horse"), and Harriet Sims (Karri Turner) is given a commendation. Also, Bud Roberts (Patrick Labyorteaux) is promoted to Lieutenant Commander, Admiral Chegwidden (John M. Jackson) retires, and Harm and Mac consider their future ("Hail and Farewell").

== Production ==
During season nine, actor John M. Jackson "decided to 'retire' from his long-running role on the series". The character of A.J. Chegwidden retired during the season finale, and was replaced the next season by David Andrews as Major General Gordon Cresswell.

== Cast and characters ==
=== Main ===
- David James Elliott as Harmon Rabb, Jr., Commander
- Catherine Bell as Sarah MacKenzie, Lieutenant Colonel in the Marine Corps.
- Patrick Labyorteaux as Bud Roberts, Lieutenant
- John M. Jackson as A. J. Chegwidden, Rear Admiral

=== Also starring ===
- Karri Turner as Harriet Sims, Lieutenant
- Randy Vasquez as Victor Galindez, Gunnery Sergeant in the Marine Corps.
- Zoe McLellan as Jennifer Coates, Petty Officer
- Scott Lawrence as Sturgis Turner, Commander

=== Recurring ===
- Andrea Thompson as Alison Krennick, Rear Admiral
- Steven Culp as Clayton Webb, CIA Agent
- Chuck Carrington as Jason Tiner, Petty Officer
- Harrison Page as Stiles Morris, Rear Admiral
- Claudette Nevins as Porter Webb, NSA Agent
- Michael Bellisario as Midshipman Michael Roberts, Midshipman
- Dana Sparks as Carolyn Imes, Commander
- Dean Stockwell as Edward Sheffield, Secretary of the Navy
- Jameson Parker as Harrison Kershaw, CIA Director
- Laura Putney as Catherine Gale, CIA Attorney
- Hallee Hirsh as Mattie Grace Johnson
- Isabella Hofmann as Meredith Cavanaugh
- Dan Lauria as Allen Blaisdell, CIA Officer
- Mary Page Keller as Beth O'Neil, Commander
- Bill Cobbs as Chaplain Matthew Turner, Sturgis' father

== Episodes ==
No. overall	No. in season	Title	Directed by	Written by	Original release date	Prod. code	US viewers (millions)
183	1	"A Tangled Webb, Part II"	Bradford May	Stephen Zito	September 26, 2003	183	13.76
Part 3 of 3: In Paraguay (after events in "A Tangled Webb, Part I"), Harm and Mac discuss their feelings for each other while hunting for the Islamic terrorist Sadik Fahd, (Note: Bernard White as Sadik Fahd) who is now on the run after they destroyed his stolen stinger missiles. Gunny Galindez must get an injured Webb to a hospital before he dies. The episode is dedicated: In Memory of Trevor Goddard; Oct. 14, 1962 - June 7, 2003; May he rest in peace.
184	2	"Shifting Sands"	Jeannot Szwarc	Dana Coen	October 3, 2003	184	13.42
Harm returns to Washington and finds that the Admiral has processed his resignation. Harm visits Webb in the hospital and takes a job flying for the CIA. A Navy Petty Officer believed killed in the Gulf War turns up married to a local Bedouin sheik and is charged with desertion, aiding the enemy, and treason for supplying Saddam's regime with intel against U.S. troop movements.
185	3	"Secret Agent Man"	Bradford May	Darcy Meyers	October 10, 2003	185	11.60
Harm is recruited by the CIA and his first mission is to drop a bugged limo in the Philippines, but he and his partner end up as impromptu field agents trying to stop an anti-U.S. bombing. Mikey Roberts asks for advice from Mac when he is asked to testify at an honor code hearing. Bud and Harriet have a party after their son is born.
186	4	"The One That Got Away"	Kenneth Johnson	Thomas L. Moran	October 17, 2003	186	12.30
While conducting a flight test in the experimental Aurora spy plane, Harm and his co-pilot must conduct a surprise mission over North Korea. Mac deals with a Marine who refused orders to kill a ten-year-old Iraqi shepherd boy who subsequently notified Iraqi fighters of the Marines' position, resulting in the deaths of two Marines and the capture of three more. Note: Based on the incident surrounding Bravo Two Zero, an eight-man British Army SAS patrol that was inserted behind Iraqi lines with the task of destroying Scud missile launchers and ended up being compromised during Operation Desert Storm.
187	5	"Touchdown"	Dennis Smith	Matt Witten	October 24, 2003	187	12.47
Mac is asked to defend a sailor accused of working with al-Qaeda after converting to Islam, leading to fraught interactions in court with Sturgis Turner when he doesn't have any issues with the sailor's (deserved) guilt and life sentence being earned via a foreign government's torture of a suspect. Harm's mission to extract an agent from Libya goes awry when the man wants his family evacuated as well, and he attempts the impossible by landing his C-130 Hercules on board the USS Seahawk, which appears to be the only safe landing point. After successfully landing the C-130 on the deck of the USS Seahawk, Harm is inadvertently shown on ZNN, which puts his CIA career at risk. (Note: This landing of a C-130 Hercules on an aircraft carrier is based on an actual feat in 1963.) The episode is followed by a message that reads: On October 30, 1963, Navy pilot Lt. James H. Flatley and co-pilot LCDR. W.W. "Smokey" Stovall landed a C-130 aboard the aircraft carrier USS Forrestal. We salute these two brave pilots along with crew members Al Sieve and Ed Brenna for their incredible demonstration of carrier aviation skill.
188	6	"Back in the Saddle"	Kenneth Johnson	Stephen Zito	October 31, 2003	188	12.19
Fired from the CIA (after he was seen on ZNN in "Touchdown"), Harm takes a job as a crop-duster. He meets Mattie, a 14-year-old tomboy and owner/operator of "Grace Aviation". Mac and Bud are surprised when a former colleague, who returns to JAG as Harm's replacement, reveals that her law credentials are fake. The Admiral asks the Secretary of the Navy to reinstate Harm's commission due to the massive backlog created from Commander Caroline Imes' failure to pass the bar exam and having to review all her previous cases.
189	7	"Close Quarters"	Bradford May	Dana Coen	November 7, 2003	189	13.05
Sturgis must determine the intent of 10 North Korean sailors rescued by an American submarine when their Midget submarine sinks while dealing with angry Korean-American intelligence officer Lt. Charles Yi (Note: Tony Lee as Lt. Charles Yi) and a possible SARS outbreak. Harm helps out Terrence Minnerly, (Note: Ossie Davis as Terrence Minnerly) a destitute African-American veteran who was once part of the Great Lakes Experience.
190	8	"Posse Comitatus"	Stephen Cragg	Paul Levine	November 14, 2003	190	13.60
Harm and Mac investigate a Marine Corps AH-1 SuperCobra helicopter pilot who intervened in a local law-enforcement hostage situation in Arizona and fired on the civilian suspect in a likely violation of the Posse Comitatus Act. Bud helps a Naval Reserve physician who claims that his Quaker beliefs make him unsuited to remain in the Navy.
191	9	"The Boast"	Bradford May	Matt Witten	November 21, 2003	191	13.26
Mac investigates when a Marine is accused of boasting about killing an Iraqi prisoner. Harm and the Admiral witness a Navy pitcher hit a Marine batter during a friendly baseball game, leading to the pitcher being charged with assault.
192	10	"Pulse Rate"	LeVar Burton	Darcy Meyers	December 2, 2003	192	13.00
When a sailor is killed while repairing a radar dish, Harm and Mac must determine if his death was an accident.
193	11	"A Merry Little Christmas"	Bradford May	Stephen Zito	December 12, 2003	193	12.56
Harm's attempts to become Mattie's legal guardian (from "Back In The Saddle") are complicated due to his single status and bachelor lifestyle. Sturgis Turner finds a new girlfriend, USO vocalist Varese Chestnut. (Note: Erica Gimpel as Varese Chestnut) Harriet Sims manages to complete her OIG liaison assignment. The Admiral has difficulties in giving a present to his girlfriend in time for Christmas, but Petty Officer Jennifer Coates manages to help out. After a Christmas sermon from Chaplain Turner, Mac brings Mattie to Harm at the Vietnam Wall after convincing Mattie's father to allow Harm to be her guardian.
194	12	"A Girl's Best Friend"	James Keach	Darcy Meyers	January 9, 2004	194	12.32
The admiral's investigation into Meredith's diamond engagement ring leads to an international smuggling operation involving blood diamonds, while Harm adjusts to having Mattie around full-time and rents a neighboring apartment for Mattie and Coates. The admiral's investigation leads him to the Naval Research Laboratory and a lieutenant smuggling lab-made diamonds on the black market. Meredith cheats on the admiral with a fellow professor from Italy.
195	13	"Good Intentions"	Michael Fresco	Thomas L. Moran	January 16, 2004	195	12.05
Mac must defend a petty officer accused of murdering a female officer, but the man has no memory of the night in question, while a Navy SEAL who purchased nerve gas needs Bud's help to avoid prison.
196	14	"People v. SecNav"	Dennis Smith	Larry Moskowitz	February 6, 2004	196	12.46
When Iraqi civilians are killed in a bombing raid conducted by Navy fighters flying off the USS Enterprise, Secretary of the Navy Edward Sheffield agrees, in a calculated political move, to stand before the International Criminal Court in The Hague, and he wants the best litigators JAG has to offer defending him on foreign soil. A babysitting incident with Little A.J. creates a rift between Bud and his brother Mikey.
197	15	"Crash"	Bradford May	Matt Witten	February 13, 2004	197	11.37
A crash aboard an aircraft carrier appears to be a case of the pilot committing suicide, and Harm and Mac face off when Mac wants to hold the pilot's CO responsible.
198	16	"Persian Gulf"	Kenneth Johnson	Philip DeGuere, Jr.	February 20, 2004	198	11.84
After events in "A Tangled Webb, Part II," the Iranian Islamic terrorist Sadik Fahd, who held Mac and Webb prisoner in Paraguay, returns and stalks Mac. She must then determine what he wants with her. Harm suffers temporary deafness when his car battery explodes in his face, which also affects his balance, effectively taking him out of play. Mac learns Fahd is involved with the theft of the Navy's lab-made diamonds (from "A Girl's Best Friend"), which he plans to use to acquire a permissive action link, an access control security device for nuclear weapons. After a bit of hand-to-hand combat, Mac shoots and kills Sadik before he can set off a bomb in a decadent Arab-American nightclub.
199	17	"Take It Like a Man"	David James Elliott	Darcy Meyers	February 27, 2004	199	11.81
A former marine is accused of stolen valor after claiming an unearned Silver Star from Panama, 1989. The fallout from Mac's killing Sadik Fahd (in "Persian Gulf") affects her ability to work on the stolen valor case. Mattie continues to work through her feelings about her father. (The episode finishes when Mac says "He hurt someone I love" and Webb thinks she means him, when she really meant Harm for the battery explosion).
200	18	"What If?"	Kenneth Johnson	Stephen Zito & Don McGill	March 12, 2004	200	10.45
As the JAG team celebrates Coates's promotion to Petty Officer First Class, a glance at an alternate reality finds Harm and Mac as a bitter divorced couple regularly berating each other, the admiral a civilian prosecutor, Bud a hot-tub salesman, Sturgis as the manager for his fiancée, Varese, Coates back to her old habits as a master thief, and Harriet a well-to-do but lonely socialite.
201	19	"Hard Time"	Bradford May	Dana Coen	April 2, 2004	201	11.02
Mac gets a handful of trouble when she is assigned to guard a female Marine prisoner (who meets every single 'angry black woman' stereotype) after being critical of the Marines originally assigned to the task. A Navy senior chief who contracted HIV after supposedly getting a blood transfusion in Africa seeks help after being exposed by his commanding officer. The admiral ends his engagement to Meredith. Guest-stars Dennis Haskins.
202	20	"Fighting Words"	Jeannot Szwarc	Matt Witten	April 30, 2004	203	9.63
Harm and Mac square off over a Marine general who spoke about the war on terror and equated the God of Islam with Satan. Sturgis must deal with the complaint of anti-Korean bias against him from "Close Quarters." Bud successfully gets the complaint against Sturgis dropped and regains the level of friendship and professional trust lost in the earlier case.
203	21	"Coming Home"	Bradford May	Stephen Zito	May 7, 2004	202	10.16
Harm helps Rachel Smithfield (Note: Susan Walters as Rachel Smithfield) whose son PFC Joseph Smithfield was killed in action in Iraq, while Mac and Bud investigate why the armor given to the troops fails to protect them. The episode is dedicated: In gratitude for those who serve and in sorrow for those who have lost their lives.
204	22	"Trojan Horse"	Peter Ellis	Darcy Meyers	May 14, 2004	204	9.25
When a kilo of heroin seized during a SEAL operation goes missing, Harm and Mac must determine where it went. The intrigue is compounded by the presence of a British MI6 agent, Simon Tanveer. Bud defends a Marine who won an American Idol-type competition, only to have the record company object when he is deployed.
205	23	"Hail and Farewell, Part I"	Dennis Smith	Dana Coen	May 21, 2004	205	11.54
Part 1 of 2: Harriet is given a commendation for her work with the USO tour and announces her pregnancy with twins and resignation from JAG for the IRR. Sturgis Turner goes to sea to investigate the deaths of six people, one of whom is Webb. The Admiral announces his retirement as Judge Advocate General of the Navy. Mac undergoes an exploratory laparoscopy, and the news is not good. (Note: The details of Mac's medical condition is not revealed until episode 10 of Season 10.) Harm discovers that Mattie's father was not drunk when her mother died; he worries that her father might reapply for custody. Harm and Mac attend Admiral Chegwidden's dining out and once again discuss their relationship and how the five-year pact they made has come due. The Admiral's final official act on active duty is to swear-in Bud to the grade of lieutenant commander, despite his amputee status. Mac breaks the bad news to Harm, ending the season on a cliffhanger that continues in the Season 10 premiere, "Hail and Farewell, Part II."

== See also ==
- 2003–2004 United States network television schedule
