= Harmon Rabb =

Fictional character

Harmon "Harm" Rabb Jr.
- David James Elliott as Harmon "Harm" Rabb Jr.
- First appearance: A New Life (September 23, 1995)
- Last appearance: Let Fate Decide; NCIS: Los Angeles (September 29, 2019)
- Portrayed by: David James Elliott

In-universe information
- Nicknames: Harm; Pappy (USS Patrick Henry); Hammer (USS Patrick Henry, USS Allegiance)
- Occupation: Naval Officer; Naval Aviator; Judge Advocate
- Family: Harmon Rabb Sr. (father); Patricia Reed (mother); Frank Burnett (stepfather); Sergei Zhukov (half-brother)
- Significant others: Caitlin Pike, Annie Pendry, Roberta Latham, Jordan Parker, Renée Peterson, Catherine Gail (fake wife), Sarah MacKenzie (former fiancée)
- Rank: Captain
- Alma mater: United States Naval Academy; Georgetown University Law Center

Harmon 'Harm' Rabb Jr. is a fictional character and lead role in the American television series JAG. The character was created by Donald P. Bellisario, as a work for hire for Paramount Television, in the script for the JAG pilot episode, which was filmed and then aired by NBC on September 23, 1995.

Harm is introduced as a lieutenant in the United States Navy serving as a judge advocate, but it is revealed that he has a background as a naval aviator. The viewer follows his naval career and personal life from that point as the series progresses. With the longevity of JAG, plenty of information on his past life and previous military service is given at various points in the series. JAG ended its ten-year run on April 29, 2005.

== Character biography ==
=== Youth and family ===
Harmon Rabb Jr. was born on October 25, 1963, in La Jolla, California to naval aviator Lieutenant Harmon Rabb, USN (played in flashbacks by David James Elliott, with a moustache) and Patricia Reed (Christina Pickles). Harm is a third generation aviator as his paternal grandfather was killed in action flying off the USS Hornet (CV-8) in 1942 during the Second World War. During the Vietnam War, his father flew F-4 Phantoms off the USS Ticonderoga and USS Hornet (CV-12). On Christmas Eve 1969, while flying an Iron Hand mission, Harmon Rabb, Sr. was shot down over North Vietnam and was considered MIA. Harm's mother went on to happily remarry Frank Burnett (Jon Cypher), a senior VP of Chrysler Corporation.

When he was 16, Harm went to Laos to look for his father together with Colonel Francis Stryker. Many years later, Harm was able to determine his father's fate: after he was shot down, Harmon Rabb, Sr. was taken to the Soviet Union, escaped from his captors, was involved with a Russian woman, and was killed protecting her from Soviet soldiers attempting to rape her in 1980. Later on, Harm met his half-brother, Sergeant Sergei Zhukov (Jade Carter) a helicopter pilot in the Russian Army, who was accused of selling weapons to Chechen rebels. Sergei was later shot down and captured by Chechen rebels.

Nearly every Christmas Eve, Harm is shown visiting the Vietnam Memorial in Washington, D.C. to pay tribute to his father. In one episode, he met Jenny Lake (played by Catherine Bell) who was present on the USS Ticonderoga when his father was shot down (and had been the fiancée of a Marine aviator who was KIA). On another Christmas Eve, he invited one of his father's former squadron buddies Rear Admiral Thomas Boone (Terry O'Quinn) to the Wall. Another year, Harm was surprised by Clayton Webb (Steven Culp) bringing his half-brother Sergei to see him at the Wall, after Webb exchanged two boxcars of wheat for Sergei's freedom in Chechnya.

=== Service (on JAG) ===
The most unlikely hero of last night's highly successful naval air strike was Lieutenant Harmon Rabb Jr., who saved Captain Thomas Boone's life when he safely landed this damaged Tomcat onto the deck of the Seahawk. What is so unusual is that Lieutenant Rabb isn't even an active pilot in the Navy. He's a member of the Judge Advocate General's Corps. He's a lawyer.

— Televised report of Chuck DePalma (Cliff DeYoung) in the pilot movie

Harmon Rabb Jr. graduated from the United States Naval Academy at Annapolis, Maryland; and although never stated in canon, judging by his birth year and other dates made explicit, it must have been in the latter half of the 1980s. (Note: Classmates from the Academy include Bruce Carmichael (James Denton), Jack Keeter (Michael McGrady), Luke Pendry (Timothy Dale Agee), Jack Raglan (John Diehl), Diane Schonke (Catherine Bell), and Sturgis Turner (Scott Lawrence).) His service number is #989548301. During his early naval career, Harm was a naval aviator flying F-14 Tomcats. On April 16, 1989, while flying an F-14 Tomcat to enforce a no-fly zone in the Gulf of Sidra, after he and his wingman were attacked, Harm shot down a Libyan Air Force MiG-23, disabled another, and forced the third one to return to its base. (Note: In real life, a similar incident did occur on January 4, 1989, known as the 1989 air battle near Tobruk; but it is never made clear if, in the fictional universe of JAG, it replaces or is in addition to the real event.) He served aboard the aircraft carrier USS Midway at some point. After an accident during a night landing on an aircraft carrier, in which his RIO (Radar Intercept Officer) dies, it is revealed Harm suffers from night blindness, he recovered on his grandmother's farm in Pennsylvania, before returning to naval service. After graduating from law school at Georgetown University Law Center and passing his bar exam, he transferred to the Judge Advocate General's Corps (JAG). During his time at JAG, he trained with Navy SEALs and Marine Force Recon at close-quarters combat, Halo jumps, and other special forces tactics.

One of his most memorable moments was, in his zealous prosecution of a Navy SEAL Chief Petty Officer, he fired an automatic weapon into the courtroom ceiling to prove it was functional. Thanks to his overall exemplary record and value as a litigator at JAG, Rabb was fortunate to have been only reprimanded, and not demoted, transferred out of JAG, or brought up on charges. Other notable cases Rabb was involved in include going undercover as a Force Recon Gunnery Sergeant, and investigating whether the actions of Navy SEAL Lieutenant Curtis Rivers (Montel Williams) warrants the Medal of Honor. Rabb's first meeting with Rivers involved a fist fight, as part of Rivers demonstrating SEAL training for capture, and the two men wanting to prove their toughness to each other. Their second meeting was after Rivers was captured by militia types and put on trial in a kangaroo court: Harm located Rivers, then had to defend him for shooting a boy who had fired first at Rivers.

After a few years as a Judge Advocate, he had laser surgery to correct what was misdiagnosed as night blindness (actually blurred vision as a result of retinal scarring caused by service action) and resumed his career as a naval aviator, flying F-14s off the USS Patrick Henry (CVN-74) as a member of VF-218 "Raptors". However, because of the slim chance of career advancement as an aviator, Harm returned to JAG after six months of service aboard Patrick Henry. While in the aviation squadron, his call sign was "Pappy" because he was older than the other aviators. Later, the other pilots renamed him "Hammer", his father's former call sign, believing Rabb's father would have been impressed by his son's bravery.

In 2002, Harm and Mac prosecutes a high-ranking Al-Qaeda member captured by US Forces in Afghanistan in a military tribunal.

In the season 8 episodes "Ice Queen" and "Meltdown"—the backdoor pilot for NCIS—Rabb is accused of killing Lieutenant Loren Singer (Nanci Chambers). He was defended by Lieutenant Commander Faith Coleman (Alicia Coppola). Though NCIS Special Agent Leroy Jethro Gibbs (Mark Harmon) initially thinks he is the culprit, Gibbs later becomes convinced of his innocence, but it is Special Agent DiNozzo (Michael Weatherly) who finds the proof exonerating him.

While serving at JAG, Rabb still kept his flight status current. At one point, after being denied leave by his commanding officer, Rear Admiral Chegwidden, to rescue Mac, Rabb resigned his commission from the Navy. He had a short stint working as an employee for the CIA. While flying for the CIA, Harm landed a C-130 Hercules aboard the aircraft carrier USS Seahawk. While working for the CIA, Rabb was certified in several different types of aircraft including the F/A-18 Hornet and the classified Aurora; however he was fired from CIA because his landing of a C-130 on an aircraft carrier was filmed by a ZNN crew. Rabb was subsequently reinstated into the Navy by SECNAV and once again served at JAG Headquarters.

After being fired from the CIA and before being reinstated into the Navy, Harm worked as a crop-duster for Grace Aviation in Blacksburg, Virginia. He became friends with and eventually took in Grace Avionics' owner, 14-year-old Mattie Grace Johnson (Hallee Hirsh). She lived with him for almost a year while her father, Tom Johnson, sobered up. In 2005, Harm was devastated when Mattie was critically injured in a plane crash.

In the final episode, Harm and Mac decided to get married; also, each was offered a career promotion, but to different locations; Harm was offered the position of Force Judge Advocate at Naval Forces Europe and to be stationed in London, while Mac was to lead the Joint Legal Services Center Southwest out of Naval Base San Diego. They decided to leave to fate which one of them would retire from the service and had Bud flip a coin. The outcome was never shown, and the career status of both remained unknown until 2019.

=== Post JAG activities ===
During the fourteenth season premiere episode of NCIS, Special Agent Timothy McGee (Sean Murray) asks Captain Bud Roberts (Patrick Labyorteaux) about Harm and Mac, but Bud is interrupted before he can answer the question.

Harm appears in the final two episodes of the tenth season of NCIS: Los Angeles as the executive officer (XO) of the aircraft carrier USS Allegiance (CVN-84). Mac also made a guest appearance in the season 10 finale of NCIS: Los Angeles. While Harm left the Navy and followed Mac to San Diego after losing the coin flip, he ended up being drawn back into service sometime later, and they mutually ended their relationship. They had not seen each other for nine years until video conferencing with each other in their new roles. Harm and Mac then met in person in the season 11 premiere, where they shared an embrace and later renewed discussion of their relationship, once again without reaching any conclusions.

=== Dates of promotion ===
Rank	Date
Lieutenant	sometime before 1995
Lieutenant Commander	March 13, 1996
Commander	November 23, 1999
Captain	April 22, 2005 (Note: Harm's promotion to captain was authorized under 10 U.S.C. § 777 to assume the rank before official "pay grade" promotion, a Navy custom known as "being frocked," by Major General Gordon Cresswell.)
Captain	(Note: Harmon Rabb serves, as of 2019, as the Executive Officer (XO) of the aircraft carrier USS Allegiance, which makes him an unrestricted line officer again, rather than a staff corps officer (e.g. a member of the Navy's Judge Advocate General's Corps), which he was for most of the duration on JAG.)

=== Assignments ===
1. July 14, 1995 – May 21, 1999, JAG officer, JAG Headquarters, Washington, D.C./Falls Church, Virginia
2. May 21, 1999 – October 5, 1999, F-14 pilot, VF-218 "Raptors", USS Patrick Henry (CVN-74)
3. October 12, 1999 – May 20, 2003, JAG officer, JAG Headquarters, Falls Church, Virginia
4. May 2003 – October 24, 2003, pilot, Air Wing, Directorate of Operations, CIA, Langley, Virginia
5. October 31, 2003, crop duster pilot, Grace Aviation, Blacksburg, Virginia
6. November 7, 2003 – April 22, 2005, JAG officer, JAG Headquarters, Falls Church, Virginia
7. ???? –(2019) –????, Executive officer (XO), USS Allegiance (CVN-84)

=== Temporary assignments ===
1. March 1997 company Gunnery Sergeant, 1st Reconnaissance Battalion, MCB Camp Pendleton, California (undercover assignment)
2. November 1998 special adviser to the House National Security Subcommittee, Washington, D.C.
3. December 15, 1998 Acting Judge Advocate General of the United States Navy, Falls Church, Virginia
4. January 13, 1999 Acting Judge Advocate General of the United States Navy, Falls Church, Virginia
5. May 11, 1999 Acting Judge Advocate General of the United States Navy, Falls Church, Virginia
6. February 27, 2001 Acting Judge Advocate General of the United States Navy, Falls Church, Virginia
7. February 2003 Military Judge, JAG Headquarters, Falls Church, Virginia
8. March 11, 2005 Acting Judge Advocate General of the United States Navy, Falls Church, Virginia

=== Partners ===
- Lieutenant (Junior Grade) / Commander Caitlin "Kate" Pike, USN (Andrea Parker) - partner with Rabb in the pilot movie, recurring character during the first season, returned as guest star in the sixth season.
- Lieutenant (Junior Grade) Meg Austin, USN (Tracey Needham) - Partnered with Harm for the remainder of the first season, left after 1st season when JAG was first canceled by NBC.
- Lieutenant Commander Tracy Manetti, USN (Tamlyn Tomita) - Harm's partner for seven episodes in season 8.
- Major / Lieutenant Colonel Sarah "Mac" MacKenzie, USMC (Catherine Bell) - Harm's long-time partner (from the start of Season Two in January 1997), best friend, and former fiancée.

=== Awards and decorations ===
Rabb was awarded a Silver Star for leading a nuclear missile, launched from an Iranian diesel submarine used by Al-Qaeda and with a mercenary Russian submarine crew, away from the USS Seahawk in an F-14 Tomcat at the end of the seventh season. He was given the decoration in a ceremony taking place at JAG HQ in the middle of the eighth season.

Rabb received his first Distinguished Flying Cross at the start of the second season in a ceremony at the White House Rose Garden by President Bill Clinton for saving the injured CAG, Captain Thomas Boone (Terry O'Quinn), of the USS Seahawk after the modified F-14 Tomcat they were flying was damaged by flak during an ATARS run prior to an alpha strike in the pilot episode. This incident also earned Rabb the respect of a former shipmate and prompted him to start wearing his wings again.

He received his second Distinguished Flying Cross in the fifth season for pushing his wingman to safety by using his wingman's tailhook and his F-14's windscreen while flying over Kosovo. (Note: This plot device was based on an actual incident during the Vietnam War in which Captain Bob Pardo, USAF pushed his wingman's crippled F-4 Phantom 60 miles so the two aircrews could eject over friendly territory.)

Rabb was awarded the Order of the Crown by King Josif of Romania (Michael Des Barres) in the second season for saving the King and his daughter Princess Alexandra (Kiersten Warren) from an assassin (Nanci Chambers) while the King was in Washington, D.C. to announce Romania's application for NATO membership.

(Note: The list below contains all of Rabb's known awards and decorations from his appearances in JAG and NCIS: Los Angeles. The names are given in order of precedence, according to SECNAVINST 1650.1F and the U.S. Navy Uniform Regulations (NAVPERS 1566.5G).)
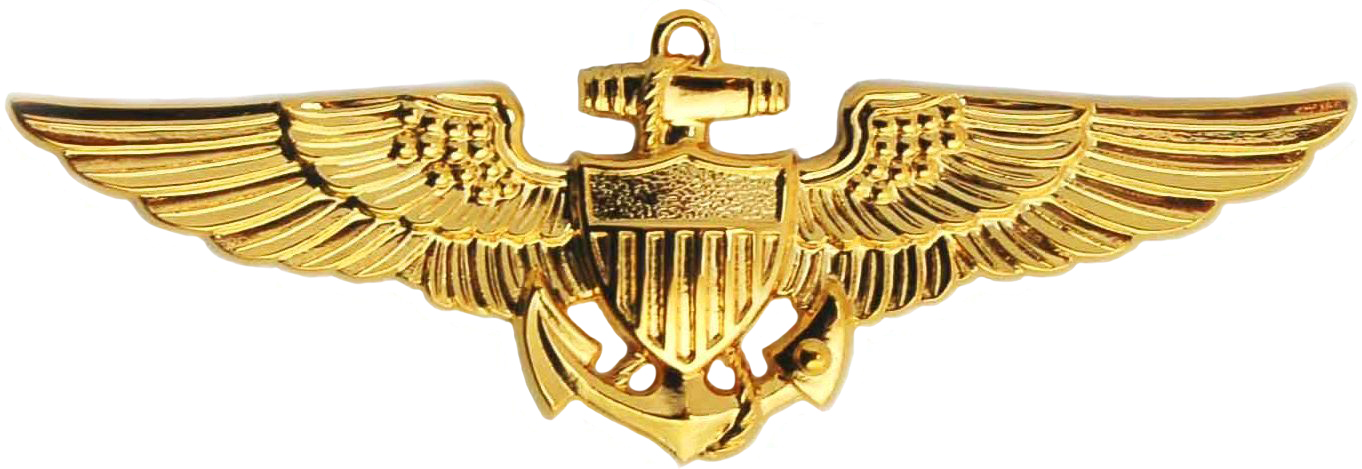

Naval Aviator insignia
Silver Star		Distinguished Flying Cross with one star
Combat Action Ribbon	Navy Meritorious Unit Commendation	National Defense Service Medal with one star
Southwest Asia Service Medal with one star	Kosovo Campaign Medal with one star	Global War on Terrorism Expeditionary Medal
Global War on Terrorism Service Medal	Kuwait Liberation Medal (Kuwait)	Order of the Crown, Knight (Romania)
Surface Warfare Officer Pin (Note: Captain Rabb qualified as a surface warfare officer sometime between the end of the original JAG series and his guest appearance on NCIS: Los Angeles, as seen on his belt buckle.)

=== Personal life ===
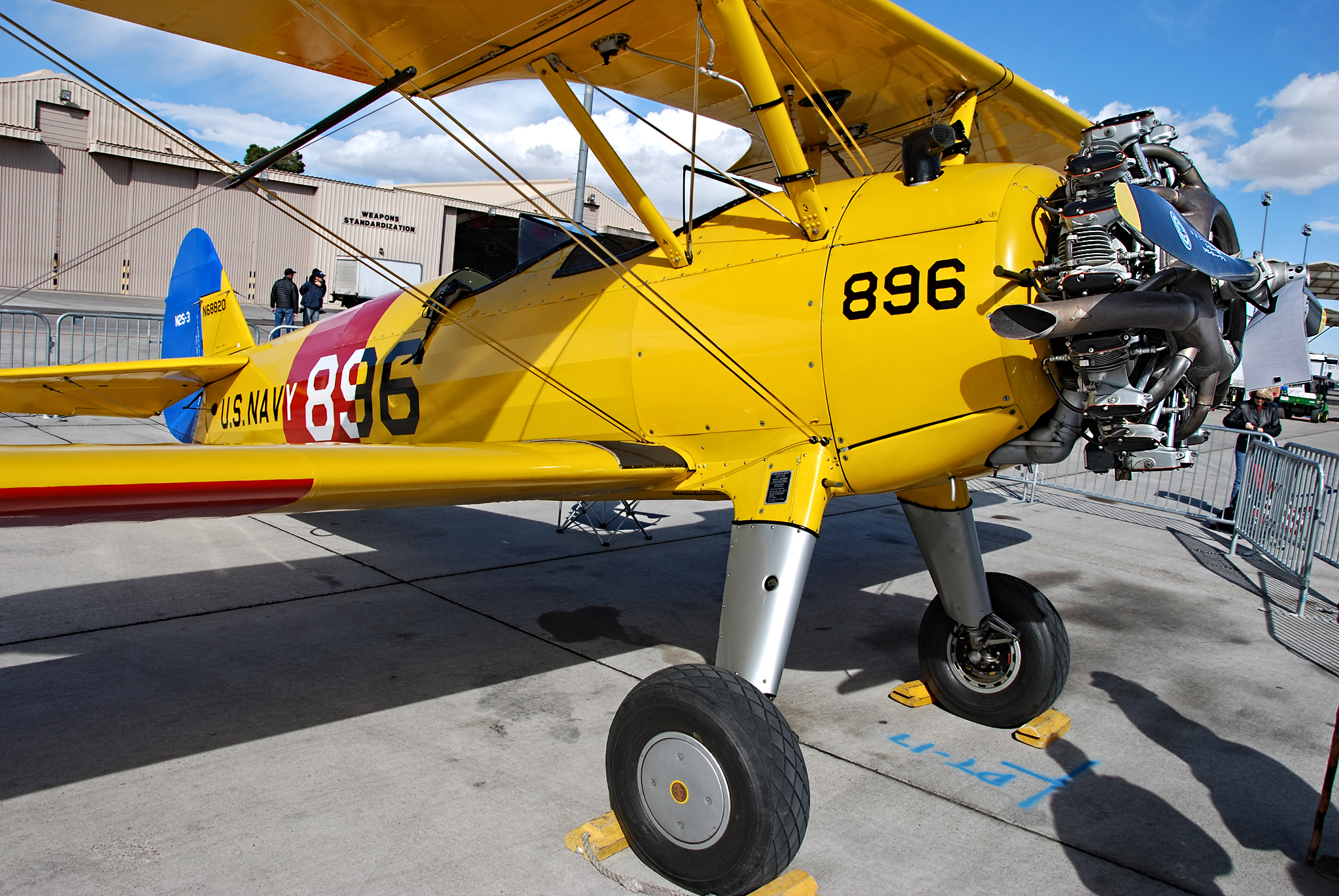
Harmon Rabb, Jr. owns a vintage Boeing-Stearman Model 75 plane.

Harmon Rabb, Jr. lives in a small Washington, D.C. loft apartment north of Union Station that he renovated himself. During the first few seasons of JAG, he smokes Cuban cigars occasionally but then later quit as he did not like being addicted to them. He owned a classic red 1969 Corvette, but it was stolen; he would later recover the car frame. He later "rebuilt" it (the steering wheel & gearshift knob was all he had left from his original car) with help from his friend Commander Sturgis Turner, whom he met during their academy days, Harm once thought the car had been stolen, but Sturgis had taken it from his garage to get a new top placed onto it. Later, it suffered damage from a collision with an old woman attempting insurance fraud.

Harm owns a vintage Boeing-Stearman Model 75 plane that he named "Sarah" after his paternal grandmother. He likes to take friends up flying when he's not working.

Rabb does not own a television and plays guitar to relax at home. Rabb has several girlfriends throughout the series, but by the end of the final season, he and Mac finally confront their feelings for one another. It is later revealed in 2019 that they mutually ended their relationship, but that neither had moved on.

== Conceptual history ==
Creator Donald P. Bellisario wanted an actor for the part of Harmon Rabb similar in the vein to that of Tom Selleck and Scott Bakula (which he had a hand in casting for the original versions of Magnum, P.I. and Quantum Leap, respectively). For the character's nickname, and shortened form of the first name, Bellisario got it from a famous quote written by 18th century US naval hero John Paul Jones, "Give me a fast ship for I intend to go into harm's way”, which Bellisario believed befitted the man of action his male lead would become. For the surname he got the inspiration from Princeton University history professor Theodore Rabb, whom he had met on a cruise in the Mediterranean Sea while he wrote the pilot. Paramount Television Group chairman Kerry McCluggage, who knew of David James Elliott from his earlier starring role on Paramount's The Untouchables (and a recent recurring role on Melrose Place and a guest role on Seinfeld), suggested him to Bellisario as a possible lead for JAG, and Bellisario (who was under contract to Paramount) made sure he was one of the actors he wanted to meet and ultimately became Elliott's champion for the part.

In February 2005, during the tenth season series co-star David James Elliott announced his departure from the series, with Bellisario noting that "his contract was up, and we never expected it to go on. We had to cut costs. [So] we started doing episodes with less of David, and it became obvious to him that we were not going to renegotiate." Both Catherine Bell and Chris Beetem had signed on for a potential eleventh season. "'It was always intended that Catherine would be [on] the show next season but [Elliott] would not,' says Bellisario." In April 2005, despite CBS informing Donald P. Bellisario that the series "may get picked up," JAG was cancelled. Bellisario stated that "the reason 'JAG' is not coming back is purely demographic. Nothing more," adding "it's wrong to say the show was canceled because [series co-star David James Elliott] said he was leaving."

== Reception ==
Variety noted in its review of the pilot episode in 1995 that "Elliott looks great in dress whites, but should display more personality if he's to be a sympathetic continuing lead" and that JAG "borrows from recent features Crimson Tide and Apollo 13 in being jargon-heavy to help generate atmosphere but as Rabb's character is allowed to develop, JAG could become one of the season's highlights". In its review at the start of the first season of JAG, Entertainment Weekly noted in its review that the male lead "radiates the sort of easy, low-key confidence that makes an actor watchable week after week" and "[w]ith his square jaw, flinty eyes, and fluffy hair, David James Elliott is so gosh-darn good-looking, it's a wonder he's not just another bland pretty-boy".

The similarities in the relationship between Rabb and Mac and that of Mulder and Scully on The X-Files has been noted by many. Entertainment Weekly elaborated further on it: in each case it is a "hunky loner", partnered with "attractive women with whom they have a charged yet ultimately platonic relationship", each working for the U.S. Government and based in the DC metropolitan area, with seemingly "unlimited travel budgets": with the key thematic difference being that in JAG with its "red-white-and-blue patriotism" the "U.S. military is seen as a force fighting for good around the world" while the other series displays "antiauthoritarian cynicism" towards ditto.

Time described the character of Rabb in 2001 as a "buff-bodied flying ace who packed a gun, a straight-arrow defense lawyer without the moral ambiguity of his counterparts on The Practice". Slate characterized David James Elliott's performance during the 7th season (2001–02) as being "erratic, evasive, and wooden." Elliott won the TV Guide Award in 2000 for "Favorite Male Actor in a Drama" for playing Rabb on JAG.
