= JAG (TV series) =

American legal drama television series (1995–2005)

- Genre: Action; Crime; Military; Legal drama
- Created by: Donald P. Bellisario
- Starring: David James Elliott; Catherine Bell; Patrick Labyorteaux; John M. Jackson; Scott Lawrence; Karri Turner; Randy Vasquez; Zoe McLellan; Tracey Needham
- Opening theme: "Theme from JAG"
- Composers: Bruce Broughton; (pilot & theme); Steven Bramson; Velton Ray Bunch; (6 episodes)
- Country of origin: United States
- Original language: English
- No. of seasons: 10
- No. of episodes: 227 (list of episodes)

Production
- Executive producers: Donald P. Bellisario; Chas. Floyd Johnson; (season 2–10); Stephen Zito; (season 2–10); David James Elliott; (season 6–10)
- Producers: Howard Kazanjian (season 1); David Bellisario; Mark Horowitz (seasons 2–8); Ed Zuckerman; R. Scott Gemmill (seasons 3–4); Chip Vucelich (season 10); David James Elliott; (season 1–5)
- Production locations: Sunset Gower Studios (studio set: season 1); Paramount Studios (studio set: season 2); Valencia Studios, Valencia, Santa Clarita, CA (studio set: seasons 3–10)
- Cinematography: Hugo Cortina (1995–2001); David J. Miller (2004); Larry Lindsey (1995–96)
- Running time: 42–47 minutes
- Production companies: Belisarius Productions; NBC Productions (season 1); Paramount Television
- Budget: $2.6 million per episode (2002)

Original release
- Network: NBC
- Release: September 23, 1995 – May 22, 1996
- Network: CBS
- Release: January 3, 1997 – April 29, 2005

Related
- NCIS franchise

JAG (U.S. military acronym for Judge Advocate General) is an American legal drama television series with a U.S. Navy theme, created by Donald P. Bellisario and produced by Belisarius Productions in association with Paramount Network Television (now CBS Studios). The series originally aired on NBC for one season from September 23, 1995, to May 22, 1996, and then on CBS for an additional nine seasons from January 3, 1997, to April 29, 2005. The first season was co-produced with NBC Productions (now Universal Television) and was originally perceived as a Top Gun meets A Few Good Men hybrid series.

In the spring of 1996, NBC cancelled the series after it finished 79th in the ratings, leaving one episode unaired. In December 1996, rival network CBS picked up the series as a midseason replacement and aired 15 new episodes as its second season. For several seasons, JAG climbed in the ratings and ultimately ran for nine additional seasons. JAG furthermore spawned the hit series NCIS, which in turn led to spin-offs NCIS: Los Angeles, NCIS: New Orleans, NCIS: Hawaiʻi, NCIS: Sydney, NCIS: Origins, NCIS: Tony & Ziva and NCIS: New York.

In total, 227 episodes were produced over 10 seasons. At the time of the original airing of its fifth season in the United States, JAG was seen in over 90 countries worldwide.

== Premise ==
The series follows the exploits of the "judge advocates" (i.e. uniformed lawyers) in the Department of the Navy's Office of the Judge Advocate General, based in the Washington metropolitan area. In the line of duty, judge advocates can prosecute and defend criminal cases under the jurisdiction of the Uniform Code of Military Justice (arising from the global presence of the U.S. Navy and the U.S. Marine Corps,) conduct informal and formal investigations, and advise on military operational law.

In the first season, the in-universe JAG headquarters was set in Washington, D.C., while in later seasons, it is located in Falls Church, Virginia. The exterior shot for the latter was of the Cravens Estate in Pasadena, which at the time was owned by the American Red Cross. The real-life Office of the Judge Advocate General (OJAG) was and is based at the Washington Navy Yard.

Akin to Law & Order, the plots from many episodes were often "ripped from the headlines" with portions of the plot either resembling or referencing recognizable aspects of actual cases or incidents, such as the USS Cole bombing ("Act of Terror" and "Valor"), the rescue of downed pilot Scott O'Grady ("Defensive Action"), the Cavalese cable car disaster ("Clipped Wings"), the USS Iowa turret explosion ("Into the Breech"), and the Kelly Flinn incident ("The Court-Martial of Sandra Gilbert").

While not part of the mission of its real-world counterpart, some of the main characters are at times also involved, directly and indirectly, in various CIA intelligence operations, often revolving around the recurring character CIA officer Clayton Webb (played by Steven Culp).

== Episodes ==
Season	Episodes	Originally released		
Season	Episodes	First released	Last released	Network
1	22	September 23, 1995	July 8, 1996	NBC
2	15	January 3, 1997	April 18, 1997	CBS
3	24	September 23, 1997	May 19, 1998	CBS
4	24	September 22, 1998	May 25, 1999	CBS
5	25	September 21, 1999	May 23, 2000	CBS
6	24	October 3, 2000	May 22, 2001	CBS
7	24	September 25, 2001	May 21, 2002	CBS
8	24	September 24, 2002	May 20, 2003	CBS
9	23	September 26, 2003	May 21, 2004	CBS
10	22	September 24, 2004	April 29, 2005	CBS

== Cast and characters ==
=== Main ===
- David James Elliott as Harmon "Harm" Rabb, Jr., USN, Lieutenant/Lieutenant Commander/Commander/Captain, JAG Corps; Acting Judge Advocate General; Captain; Executive Officer of USS Allegiance (NCIS: Los Angeles). (While promoted to Captain in the last episode, Rabb is never seen in that role in the series, only in a subsequent episode of NCIS: Los Angeles)
- Tracey Needham as Meg Austin, USN (season 1), Lieutenant JG
- Catherine Bell as Sarah "Mac" MacKenzie, USMC (seasons 2–10), Major/Lieutenant Colonel, JAG Corps; OJAG Chief of Staff; Acting Judge Advocate General; Head of Joint Legal Services Southwest (San Diego); Marine Liaison to the U.S. Secretary of State (NCIS: Los Angeles). (It is unclear if Mac ever took the Head of Joint Legal Services Southwest [San Diego] as the series ends with a coin toss in which either she or Rabb will resign their commission so they can be together.)
- Patrick Labyorteaux as Budrick "Bud" Roberts, Jr., USN (main: seasons 2–10; recurring: season 1); Ensign; Lieutenant JG/Lieutenant/Lieutenant Commander, JAG Corps; JAG Captain (NCIS).
- John M. Jackson as Albert Jethro "A.J." Chegwidden, USN (main: seasons 2–9; recurring: season 1), Rear Admiral, JAG Corps; Judge Advocate General of the U.S. Navy; SEAL; lawyer (NCIS), later retired (NCIS: Los Angeles).
- Scott Lawrence as Sturgis Turner, USN (main: season 10; recurring: seasons 7–9), Commander, JAG Corps; Acting Judge Advocate General; submariner.
- Zoe McLellan as Petty Officer Jennifer Coates (main: season 10; recurring: seasons 7–9), USN. Legalman, personal aide to the Judge Advocate General.

=== Recurring ===
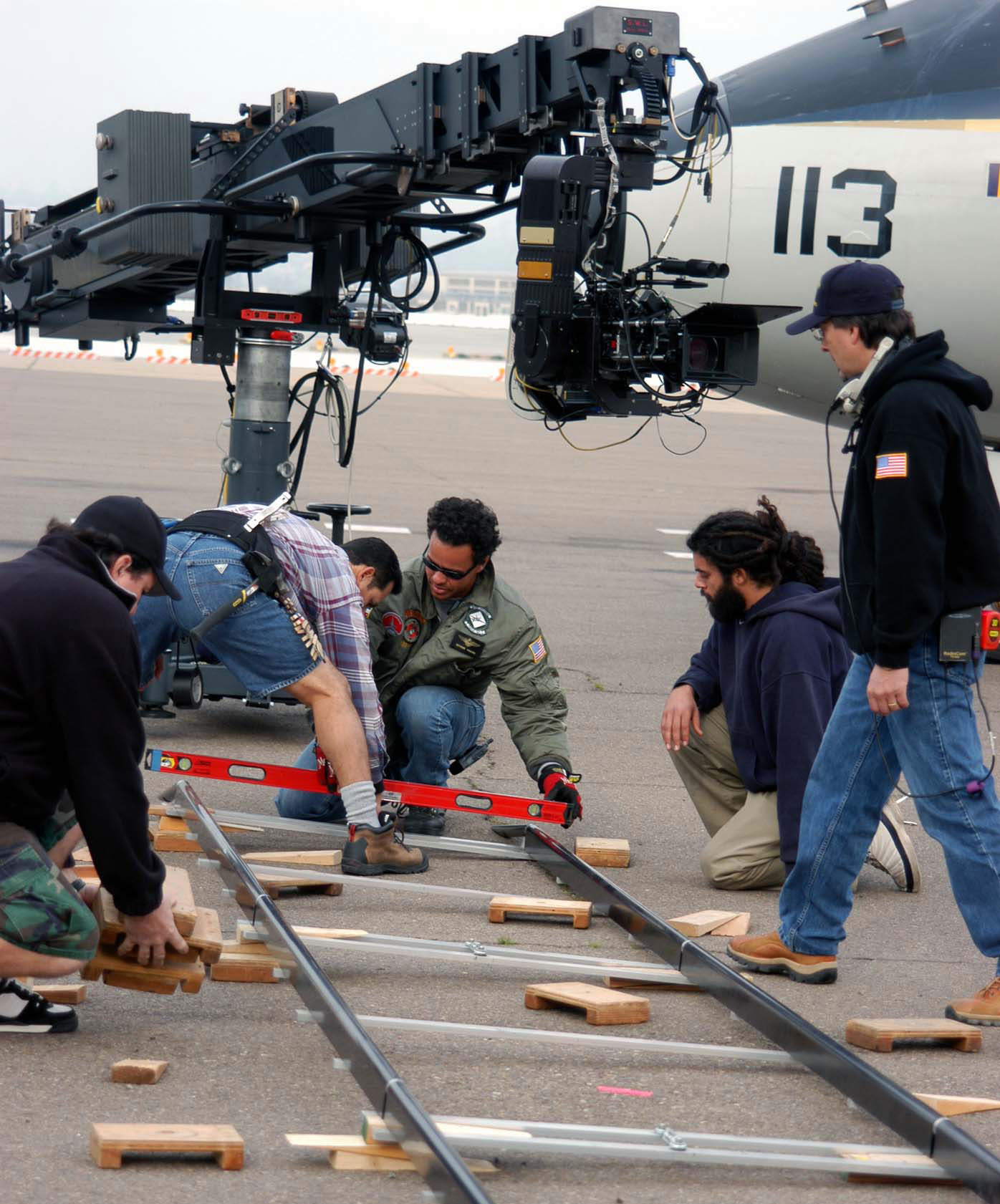
Crew members set up for a shot at NAS North Island (2005)

- Andrea Parker as Lt. JG / Lieutenant / Commander Caitlin Pike, USN (Seasons 1, 6)
- Trevor Goddard as Lt. Commander Mic Brumby, RAN (Seasons 4–7)
- Karri Turner as Ensign / Lt. JG / Lieutenant Harriet Sims, USN (Seasons 2–10)
- Michael Bellisario as Seaman / Petty Officer Third Class / Midshipman Mike "Mikey" Roberts, USN (Seasons 3–10) appeared in pilot episode as fisherman's son, was pizza delivery man in episode introducing Mark Falcon character.
- Jeff MacKay as Master Chief Petty Officer Bud "Big Bud" Roberts, USN (Seasons 3–10)
- Nanci Chambers as Lieutenant Loren Singer, USN (Seasons 5–8)
- Randy Vasquez as Gunnery Sergeant Victor Galindez, USMC (Seasons 5–9)
- Chuck Carrington as Petty Officer Jason Tiner, USN (Seasons 2–9)
- Terry O'Quinn as Captain / Rear Admiral Thomas Boone, USN (Seasons 1–2, 6–8)
- Steven Culp as CIA Officer Clayton Webb (Seasons 2–10)
- Andrea Thompson as Commander / Captain Alison Krennick, USN (Seasons 1, 9)
- Chris Beetem as Lieutenant Gregory Vukovic, USN (Season 10)
- Meta Golding as Lieutenant Tali Mayfield, USN (Season 10)
- Jordana Spiro as Lieutenant Catherine Graves, USN (Season 10)
- David Andrews as Major General Gordon Cresswell, USMC (Season 10)
- Rif Hutton as Lt. Commander Alan Mattoni, USN (Seasons 3–6)
- Sibel Galindez as Lieutenant Elizabeth Hawkes, "Skates", USN (Seasons 2, 4–7)
- Oliver North as Ollie
- Montel Williams as Lieutenant Curtis Rivers (Seasons 3–5)

== Production ==
"Dramatic, action adventure programming has all but disappeared from the airwaves. I don't do sitcoms; I don't do urban neurotic dramas. I created JAG because it's the kind of television I like to watch. Besides that, I served four years in the Marine Corps and remain fascinated by the military's code of ethics—God, duty, honor, country—and how, in these rapidly changing times, it still survives. That's what Harm and Mac, and JAG as a whole, represent."

— Donald P. Bellisario on creating JAG

=== Background and development ===
The creator of JAG, Donald P. Bellisario, served for four years in the U.S. Marine Corps, and after having worked his way up through advertising jobs, he landed his first network television job as a story editor for the World War II–era series Baa Baa Black Sheep, where he got a habit of promoting a consistent promilitary stance in a business where he got the perception that "antiwar" and "antisoldier" mentality were the commonplace. The stereotype in the post–Vietnam War era of "crazed Vietnam veterans" was notably subverted, by not just one, but three of the main characters, in Magnum P.I., of which Bellisario was the co-creator. Following the cancellation of his series Quantum Leap, Bellisario moved his production deal from Universal to Paramount (headed by former Universal executive Kerry McCluggage), and began working on a one-shot screenplay of a murder mystery aboard a U.S. Navy aircraft carrier, where the victim was a woman and naval aviator, inspired by the then-current introduction of female fighter pilots onboard aircraft carriers and in the wake of fallout of the Tailhook scandal.

While doing research on which organizational entities would partake in investigative efforts of crimes committed aboard Naval vessels, Bellisario learned that the special agents of the Naval Criminal Investigative Service filled the police role, and the uniformed lawyers, in the Navy's Judge Advocate General's Corps, could alternate between the role of defense attorney, prosecutor, and field investigator. Bellisario chose to go ahead with the lawyers and remarked the unique advantages it brought from a story-telling point of view: "Unlike most law shows, I've got a detective, a prosecutor, and a defender."

=== Production ===
With the cancellation on NBC and the immediate pick-up by CBS, showrunner Donald P. Bellisario was allowed greater creative freedom in terms in story and casting. While over on NBC, its West Coast president Don Ohlmeyer wanted more action rather than legal drama and imposed a new female lead, Tracey Needham, rather than continuing with Andrea Parker as in the pilot movie. The move over to CBS, with its older skewing audience and its president Les Moonves giving freer reins, allowed Bellisario to retool JAG from an emphasis on action stories to character driven stories and building an ensemble cast.

At the start of the third season, JAG moved its production base from the Paramount lot at Melrose Avenue in Hollywood out to Valencia Studios in Santa Clarita in order to save costs and putting more of the budget on screen rather than spending on soundstage rentals. The spin-off series NCIS has remained on the same studio facility for its entire duration and was filmed side-by-side with JAG for the ninth and tenth season of the latter and the first and second season of the former.

While the scope of the in-universe settings of JAG were global, the show was, with only a few exceptions, entirely filmed on location in Southern California and mostly within Greater Los Angeles and the studio zone in which unionized film crews can commute without receiving additional remuneration. JAG had around the dawn of millennium two location managers for this task alternating between episodes, Paul F. Brinkman, Jr and Marvin Bernstein. A few examples of buildings acting as stand-in on location shooting are:

- Park Plaza Hotel, the Gothic revival style building with Art Deco elements (Moscow hotel),
- Angeles National Forest (Siberian taiga),
- Shrine Auditorium, the masonic temple and large-event venue (Bahrain and various settings in the Middle East),
- Sisters of the Immaculate Heart of Mary building in the Los Feliz district (American Embassy in Rome and various other places in Italy),
- Old Town shopping district in Pasadena (East Coast small towns.)

The advance of computer-generated imagery (CGI) made the process of removing palm trees and California license plates simpler still. As to how effectively the deception worked according to the showrunner when JAG started to air overseas, "we started to get letters from England, from Germany, from the Middle Eastern companies. A lot of these viewers wanted to know: When were we going to shoot in their city?"

It was reported by Variety in February 2002 that the average production cost per episode of JAG at that time was around $2.6 million.

=== Collaboration with the military ===
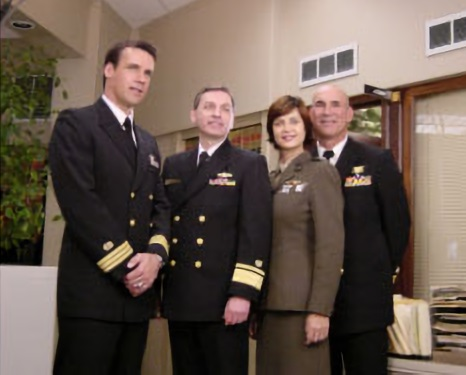
The then-Judge Advocate General of the Navy, Rear Admiral Donald J. Guter (second from left), visiting the set, meeting with the cast during the shooting of "Liberty" in 2001

Initially, the producers of JAG did not receive any co-operation from the U.S. Department of Defense entertainment media liaison offices, due to sensitivity in light of all the accumulative negative publicity that had been generated from the Tailhook scandal and its aftermath. However, the lack of co-operation from the military was not a show-stopper, as the JAG production team, by virtue of being a Paramount Pictures production, had access to the abundant stock footage from the studio's motion pictures, which included many films with military content, such as Top Gun, The Final Countdown, and The Hunt for Red October (and the two other Tom Clancy film adaptations).

In 1997, though, the naval services had begun to change their minds, and began to render support to the production team on a script-by-script basis with the United States Marine Corps more eager than the United States Navy to render production assistance. A primetime network series about Navy lawyers bringing out controversial subjects in a very public arena was during the third season apparently no longer an issue in itself, but as noted by Commander Bob Anderson of the Navy Office of Information West in Los Angeles in a TV Guide interview: "We're fine with that as long as the bad guys are caught and punished, and the institution of the Navy is not the bad guy". The Headquarters Marine Corps Entertainment Liaison Office lists JAG on their website in its portfolio of collaborations.

The production filmed on a regular basis at nearby installations, primarily at Naval Base Ventura County and its two component parts: Naval Air Station Point Mugu and Naval Construction Battalion Center Port Hueneme. Between July 12–14, 1999, three of the lead actors (Elliott, Bell, and Labyorteaux) and crew filmed aboard the nuclear-powered Nimitz-class aircraft carrier USS John C. Stennis (CVN-74) off the coast of Southern California for scenes for the first 3 episodes of the 5th season.

=== Series end ===
Harm (David James Elliott) and Mac (Catherine Bell) use a challenge coin to determine who will resign their commission.

David James Elliott left the show at the end of the 10th season; the show was subsequently not renewed for an 11th season by the network. The show also introduced new younger characters, including former As the World Turns star Chris Beetem, and Jordana Spiro from The Huntress.

The producers also considered relocating the fictional setting of the show, from Falls Church to Naval Base San Diego. An episode of the final season, "JAG: San Diego" had the main cast, excluding Harm, going to the San Diego naval base and working with the local JAG office there. Though it was reportedly considered as a pilot episode, as a reformat of the show aiming for a younger audience, CBS ultimately decided not to pursue a new series.

Nevertheless, CBS canceled the show on April 4, 2005, after 10 seasons. The final episode, "Fair Winds and Following Seas", aired on April 29, 2005, and in which Harm and Mac are assigned different stations: Harm in London, Mac in San Diego. They finally confront their feelings and decide to get married. The episode ends with Bud tossing a challenge coin to decide which one would give up their military career to be with the other. However, in keeping with JAG tradition, the outcome of the toss is never seen, as the screen fades to black, showing only the coin, which bears the inscription "1995 – 2005", the years the series spanned.

=== Postscript ===
The result of the coin toss was eventually revealed in the 2019 finale of the tenth season of NCIS: Los Angeles, "False Flag", in which David James Elliott and Catherine Bell both appeared. Mac won the coin toss and Harm resigned his commission and moved with her to San Diego, but later they mutually ended their relationship and Harm rejoined the Navy and is currently serving as the XO of the (fictional) aircraft carrier, USS Allegiance. Mac left the Marines to serve as the USMC liaison to the secretary of state, a civilian position at the U.S. Department of State. Harm and Mac had not seen each other in 9 years until video conferencing with each other in their new roles. In the eleventh season premiere, Harm and Mac reunite in person, share an embrace, and later renew a discussion of their relationship, once again without reaching any conclusions.

== Reception ==
=== Critical reception ===
The pilot movie received a moderately positive review in Variety, which noted that it "borrows from recent features Crimson Tide and Apollo 13 in being jargon-heavy to help generate atmosphere but as Rabb's character is allowed to develop, JAG could become one of the season's highlights." Entertainment Weekly was less impressed by the first episodes of the first season and noted that there is, "...nothing new about JAG's plots; they're the sort of good-guy-against-the-establishment stuff you'd expect, with the scripts (including a recent one cowritten by the mystery novelist Robert Crais) a slight cut above most hour-long dramas."

During its run, JAG and its two lead actors (Elliott as "Harm" and Bell as "Mac") featured on the cover of TV Guide on two occasions: July 6, 2002 ("ON THE WINGS OF AMERICAN PRIDE, THE NAVY DRAMA FLIES HIGH"), and on May 3, 2003 ("JAG SOARS! Tough Timely Stories And a Likely Spin-off"). Virginia Heffernan wrote a scathing critique of JAG in the liberal progressive online magazine Slate that "As right-wing military propaganda JAG operates like socialist realist novels and the barking radio of G. Gordon Liddy: It pounds home its message at deafening volume, razing nuance and stranding viewers with nothing else to think." Furthermore, that in many episodes it "...typically opens with the suggestion that the military has done something terrible—and the officers in question do show signs of guilt (reticence). But in the end they reveal their absolute innocence and their higher purpose—and both the military and its reticence are exonerated."

The August 2009 issue of ABA Journal ranked the "25 greatest legal TV shows of all time" and JAG came in at number 13. JAG was on spot 10 out of 20 on a 2018 Wonderwall.com list over "Best TV shows about the military".

=== Nielsen ratings ===
Seasonal rankings (based on average total viewers per episode) of JAG on NBC (first season) and CBS (other seasons).

Note: U.S. network television seasons generally start in late September and end in late May, which coincides with the completion of the May sweeps.

Season	Season premiere	Season finale	Time slot	Network	TV season	Rank	Viewers (in millions)
1	September 23, 1995	May 22, 1996	Saturday at 8:00 pm (EST) (September 23, 1995 – February 3, 1996); Wednesday at 8:00 pm (EST) (March 13 – May 22, 1996)	NBC	1995–1996	79	11.56
2	January 3, 1997	April 18, 1997	Friday at 9:00 pm (EST) (January 3 – March 7, 1997); Friday at 8:00 pm (EST) (March 28 – April 18, 1997)	CBS	1996–1997	68	11.80
3	September 23, 1997	May 19, 1998	Tuesday at 8:00 pm (EST)	CBS	1997–1998	36	12.90
4	September 22, 1998	May 25, 1999	Tuesday at 8:00 pm (EST)	CBS	1998–1999	17	14.20
5	September 21, 1999	May 23, 2000	Tuesday at 8:00 pm (EST)	CBS	1999–2000	25	14.07
6	October 3, 2000	May 22, 2001	Tuesday at 8:00 pm (EST)	CBS	2000–2001	31	13.00
7	September 25, 2001	May 21, 2002	Tuesday at 8:00 pm (EST)	CBS	2001–2002	15	14.80
8	September 24, 2002	May 20, 2003	Tuesday at 8:00 pm (EST)	CBS	2002–2003	26	12.97
9	September 26, 2003	May 21, 2004	Friday at 9:00 pm (EST)	CBS	2003–2004	37	10.80
10	September 24, 2004	April 29, 2005	Friday at 9:00 pm (EST)	CBS	2004–2005	50	9.66

It was noted in 1998 that the largest segment of the audience was those over the age of 55. JAG had its highest ever ratings in the fall of 2001 (season 7), beating episodes of The Practice airing on ABC in the same timeslot and in symbiosis with the other CBS law dramas on Tuesdays, Judging Amy and The Guardian. In 2003, the median age audience for JAG (along with the other CBS series' The Guardian and Becker) was 58 years, the second highest median in primetime network television, with only CBS 60 Minutes higher up.

=== Awards and nominations ===
==== Primetime Emmy Awards ====
Year	Category	Nominee	Episode	Result
1996	Outstanding Individual Achievement in Editing for a Series – Single Camera Production	Jon Koslowsky	Pilot Episode	Won
1996	Outstanding Individual Achievement in Main Title Theme Music	Bruce Broughton	N/A	Nominated
1996	Outstanding Individual Achievement in Costuming for a Series	L. Paul Dafelmair	"Smoked"	Nominated
1997	Outstanding Individual Achievement in Costuming for a Series	L. Paul Dafelmair	"Cowboys and Cossacks"	Won
1998	Outstanding Cinematography for a Series	Hugo Cortina	"The Good of the Service"	Nominated
1999	Outstanding Cinematography for a Series	Hugo Cortina	"Gypsy Eyes"	Nominated
1999	Outstanding Costuming for a Serie	L. Paul Dafelmair	"Gypsy Eyes"	Won
2000	Outstanding Cinematography for a Single Camera Series	Hugo Cortina	"Boomerang, Part II"	Nominated
2001	Outstanding Cinematography for a Single Camera Series	Hugo Cortina	"Adrift, Part I"	Nominated
2002	Outstanding Music Composition for a Series (Dramatic Underscore)	Steven Bramson	"Adrift, Part II"	Nominated
2003	Outstanding Music Composition for a Series (Dramatic Underscore)	Steven Bramson	"Need to Know"	Nominated

==== Other awards and nominations ====
Year	Association	Category	Nominee(s)	Episode	Result
1999	Humanitas Prize	60 Minute Category	—	Angels 30	Nominated
2000	ASCAP Awards	Top TV Series	Bruce Broughton; Steven Bramson	—	Won
2000	TV Guide Awards	Favorite Actor in a Drama	David James Elliott	—	Won
2000	Young Artist Awards	Best Performance in a TV Drama Series – Guest Starring Young Actress	Aysia Polk	—	Nominated
2001	Imagen Foundation Awards	Primetime Television Series	—	Retreat Hell	Won
2003	ASCAP Awards	Top TV Series	Bruce Broughton; Steven Bramson	—	Won
2004	ASCAP Awards	Top TV Series	Bruce Broughton; Steven Bramson	—	Won
2004	Young Artist Awards	Best Performance in a TV Series – Recurring Young Actress	Hallee Hirsh	—	Nominated

== Connections with other shows ==
=== NCIS spin-off ===
In January 2003, Donald P. Bellisario was developing a JAG spin-off, around the work of the Naval Criminal Investigative Service. It was aired in April 2003 in a two-part backdoor pilot in which Commander Rabb is arrested, but later vindicated as innocent, for the murder of Lieutenant Singer. The two episodes, titled "Ice Queen" and "Meltdown", focused on the NCIS team, with most of the JAG regulars as supporting characters. Whereas the episodes of JAG are primarily oriented on a mixture of courtroom drama and military activities in the field, NCIS episodes are more focused, as the meaning of the acronym suggests, on criminal investigations. NCIS also follows a different storytelling format from JAG, emphasizing character humor to a larger extent than its parent program. NCIS later produced its own spin-offs, NCIS: Los Angeles, NCIS: New Orleans, NCIS: Hawaiʻi, and NCIS: Sydney, which shows a further departure from the styles and themes of JAG.

The two episodes "Ice Queen" and "Meltdown" were edited down to a one-hour pilot film, which was then used to sell the idea of NCIS as a new series to CBS; the pilot used the title, "NCIS – The Beginning". It was later also used to introduce the show to CBS affiliates and advertisers. It was only broadcast once and is not available on home video.

Excluding the backdoor pilot, few major characters from JAG have appeared in the NCIS series. Patrick Labyorteaux appeared briefly as Lieutenant Bud Roberts in the NCIS first-season episode "Hung Out to Dry" and again – now with the rank of captain – in the season fourteen episode "Rogue", advising the NCIS team on a legal issue. John M. Jackson returned in May 2013 as retired Rear Admiral A.J. Chegwidden, now a civilian attorney in the private sector hired by Director Vance to provide legal representation for Special Agent Gibbs, in the season ten NCIS finale, "Damned If You Do". Jackson has recurred as A.J. Chegwidden since the eighth season of NCIS: Los Angeles. Chegwidden is a Vietnam-era compatriot of series regulars Hetty Lange (Linda Hunt) and Owen Granger (Miguel Ferrer). David James Elliot and Catherine Bell returned to their roles as Harmon Rabb and Sarah MacKenzie for the first time since JAG ended in the last two episodes of the tenth season of NCIS: Los Angeles.

While several other actors who played major roles on JAG have also appeared on NCIS, such as Scott Lawrence (Sturgis Turner on JAG), Steven Culp (Clayton Webb on JAG), Randy Vazquez (Victor Galindez on JAG), and Michael Bellisario (Mikey Roberts on JAG); they played completely different characters when appearing on NCIS. Similarly, after Sean Murray (Donald Bellisario's stepson) played a one-off Ensign character in JAG season 4, and the recurring character of Danny Walden in season 6, he joined the core cast of NCIS during the first season as Tim McGee, and is still on the show as of 2024.

First introduced in the NCIS back-door pilot, Alicia Coppola appeared as Navy judge advocate Lieutenant Commander Faith Coleman in several episodes of NCIS. Adam Baldwin played the same guest role, Navy SEAL Commander Michael Rainer, in one episode of each show.

=== First Monday cross-over ===
First Monday was a series co-created by Bellisario and Paul Levine about fictional U.S. Supreme Court justices and their clerks, which aired in 2002 and starred James Garner and Joe Mantegna. The character of U.S. Senator Edward Sheffield (Dean Stockwell), who appeared in three episodes of that show, later became a recurring character on JAG as the new Secretary of the Navy, starting in season eight.

=== Yes, Dear tribute ===
The sitcom Yes, Dear did an episode called "Let's Get Jaggy with It" where Greg's father Tom (Tim Conway) wins a walk-on role on JAG. Catherine Bell guest-starred as herself while David James Elliott, Patrick Labyorteaux, and Scott Lawrence guest-starred as their respective JAG characters.

=== Bette tribute ===
The second episode of Bette Midler's short-lived sitcom Bette, titled "And the Winner Is", had a storyline where her title character wins an award for guest starring in an episode of JAG. The award-winning scene shows Bette playing a character who interrogates Harmon Rabb after comedically checking out his posterior. David James Elliott guest stars in this episode-within-an-episode. The episode aired on CBS on October 18, 2000.

== Home media ==
On September 1, 1998, the pilot episode of JAG was released on VHS cassette in the United States by Paramount Home Entertainment. However, no other episodes of the series proper was released on any home entertainment media while the show was still in production, allegedly due to syndication deals made with several broadcasters.

Beginning in 2006, CBS Home Entertainment (distributed by Paramount) has released all 10 seasons on DVD in regions 1, 2 and 4. Seasons 1 to 4 are released with a 4:3 aspect ratio, while seasons 5 to 10 have a 16:9 aspect ratio. The region-2 and −4 editions do not have the bonus features (audio commentaries and retrospective interviews) included on the region-1 editions of seasons one and two.

On December 11, 2012, CBS released JAG: The Complete Series – Collector's Edition on DVD in region 1. This collection contains, other than all 227 episodes of the series and the bonus features of the previously released individual season packs, one disc with new bonus features and a booklet with production notes.

On April 14, 2015, CBS Home Entertainment released a repackaged version of the complete series set, at a lower price, in Region 1. It does not include the bonus disc that was part of the original complete series set.

DVD name	No. of episodes	Release dates			Extra features
DVD name	No. of episodes	Region 1	Region 2	Region 4	Extra features
The Complete First Season	22	July 25, 2006	October 16, 2006		Behind the Scenes Footage; Making of "Featurette"; Episode Commentaries; Rare unaired episode "Skeleton Crew"
The Complete Second Season	15	November 7, 2006	September 10, 2007	August 16, 2007	Behind the Scenes Footage; Making of "Featurette"; Episode Commentaries
The Third Season	24	March 20, 2007	June 24, 2008	June 5, 2008	—N/a
The Fourth Season	24	August 21, 2007	October 22, 2008	October 2, 2008	Gag reel
The Fifth Season	25	January 29, 2008	May 7, 2009		Gag reel
The Sixth Season	24	May 20, 2008	September 14, 2009	September 3, 2009	—N/a
The Seventh Season	24	November 4, 2008	March 22, 2010	March 4, 2010	—N/a
The Eighth Season	24	March 17, 2009	June 21, 2010	August 5, 2010	Gag Reel; NCIS Pilot episodes "Ice Queen" and "Meltdown"
The Ninth Season	24	November 10, 2009	September 20, 2010	November 4, 2010	—N/a
The Final Season	22	February 9, 2010	June 29, 2011	July 6, 2011	"JAG: The Final Goodbye"
The Complete Series	227	December 11, 2012	June 27, 2011	—N/a	All bonus features of individual season packs One disc of new bonus features, including the documentary The JAGged Edge
The Complete Series	227	April 14, 2015	—N/a	—N/a	All bonus features of individual season packs

== Soundtrack ==
On April 26, 2010, Intrada released an album of music on compact disc from the series, featuring Bruce Broughton's theme and his pilot movie score (tracks 1–15) and weekly composer Steven Bramson's score from the second-season episode "Cowboys & Cossacks", including Broughton's format music (the main and end title theme and commercial bumper.)

All tracks are written by Bruce Broughton (track 1–15 and 18, including the leitmotif "Theme from JAG" used in many of the Bramson tracks) and Steve Bramson (16–17 and 19–28).

Intrada release
No.	Title	Length
1.	"Engage and Destroy; Main Title"	4:42
2.	"Getting Some Air; Angela Overboard"	2:39
3.	"Harm and Kate Arrive"	2:21
4.	"Harm's Past; Over Bosnia"	1:55
5.	"Gold Wings & Dress Whites; Wave Off"	1:31
6.	"Contemplation"	0:27
7.	"Joyride"	1:49
8.	"Angela on a Slab"	1:34
9.	"Playout"	0:15
10.	"Scuttlebutt's True"	4:27
11.	"To Hell and Back, Sir; Let'm Trap!"	6:05
12.	"Harm Does It"	3:25
13.	"Judgement Call"	2:09
14.	"Gold Wings, White Uniform"	1:56
15.	"End Credits"	0:57
16.	"Format Bumper"	0:07
17.	"Teaser"	1:43
18.	"Format Main Title"	0:47
19.	"Act One Playon; Exchange"	1:20
20.	"Fire!; Grinkov"	4:29
21.	"One Rule of War"	1:16
22.	"Jumping Ship; Convincing Yuri"	2:12
23.	"Yuri Turns"	1:57
24.	"To the Brig; Boxing Petavitch"	1:41
25.	"Live Missile"	0:42
26.	"This Is War"	3:05
27.	"Grinkov Relents"	4:26
28.	"A Sailor's Death; Format End Credits"	1:44

== See also ==
- Interservice rivalry
- Judge Advocate General's Corps, U.S. Navy
- Uniform Code of Military Justice
- United States Navy Regulations
- Uniforms of the United States Navy
- Uniforms of the United States Marine Corps
- List of U.S. Navy acronyms
- List of United States Marine Corps acronyms and expressions
- The Code, 2019 TV series
