= Sarah MacKenzie =

Fictional character in the television series JAG

- Catherine Bell as Lieutenant Colonel Sarah MacKenzie
- First appearance: "We the People"; JAG (January 3, 1997)
- Last appearance: "Code of Conduct"; NCIS: Los Angeles (April 26, 2020)
- Created by: Donald P. Bellisario
- Portrayed by: Catherine Bell; Alia Shawkat (as a child; episode "Second Sight")

In-universe information
- Nickname: Mac
- Occupation: Judge Advocate in the United States Marine Corps
- Spouse: Christopher Ragle (deceased)
- Significant others: Dalton Lowne (lover, killed); John Farrow (lover); Michael "Mic" Brumby (former fiancé); Clayton Webb (lover); Harmon Rabb, Jr. (former fiancé)
- Relatives: Joseph MacKenzie (father); Deanne (mother); Colonel Matthew O'Hara (uncle)
- Nationality: U.S. Citizen
- Residence: Apartment in Georgetown, Washington, D.C.
- Rank: Major (199?-1999); Lieutenant Colonel (1999-Present)
- Alma mater: University of Minnesota; USMC Officer Candidate School; USMC The Basic School; Duke University School of Law

Sarah "Mac" MacKenzie is a fictional character and lead role in the American television series JAG, played by Catherine Bell. The character was created by Donald P. Bellisario, as a work for hire for Paramount Television, in the script for the first episode of the second season, which was filmed and then aired by CBS on January 3, 1997.

Mac is introduced as a Major in the United States Marine Corps designated as a judge advocate, assigned to the Office of the Judge Advocate General of the Navy in Falls Church, Virginia, who has had to overcome many obstacles to get where she is career-wise. The viewer follows her professional career and personal life from that point as the series progresses. With the longevity of JAG, plenty of information on her past life and career is given at various points in the series. JAG ended its ten-year run on April 29, 2005.

After a nine season long will-they-won't-they relationship, Mac and the other main character, Harmon "Harm" Rabb (David James Elliott), become engaged during the show's final episode, flipping a coin to see who will resign their commission, but the outcome is not revealed at the end of the series.

== Character arc in JAG ==
A military brat born in the late 1960s, Sarah MacKenzie had a troubled childhood; her mother abandoned her and her alcoholic father on the night of Mac's 15th birthday. Her father, Joseph MacKenzie, a non-commissioned officer in the Marine Corps, was physically abusive towards her mother, and emotionally and verbally abusive to Mac. As a partial result of this, Mac became an alcoholic in her mid-to-late teens and had no contact with her mother Deanne (Conchata Ferrell) until she reappeared at her father's deathbed. She also learns at this time that her large white mutt, named Ruggles, was abandoned at a boarding house during her mother's travels after fleeing from her abusive father. She showed more sympathy for her father's efforts to be a good dad, pathetic as they were, and more anger at her mother for leaving them to fend for themselves.

Sarah MacKenzie ran away from home when she was 17 (her junior year of high school), and apparently married Christopher Ragle a year later. They were both drunk for much of their married life. He was later arrested and sent to prison for motor vehicle theft. At some point, Mac finished high school. On the night of her graduation, she was traveling in a car with her friend Eddie. They were both drunk, and were involved in a car accident that killed Eddie. Her uncle USMC Colonel Matthew O'Hara took her to Red Rock Mesa, Arizona, to dry out. Mac later repaid the debt owed to him by making sure he did not get killed during an incident where he and a group of rogue Marines hijacked a van transporting the Declaration of Independence.

After graduating from high school and then at some point earning a bachelor's degree, Sarah MacKenzie joined the Marine Corps and received her commission through Officer Candidate School.

The first known assignment for Mac in the canon was at the grade of first lieutenant at the Headquarters and Service Battalion in Okinawa, Japan, as an administrative officer under John Farrow. It was under his recommendation that Mac was sponsored by the Marine Corps to earn a law degree at Duke University School of Law.

While stationed in Okinawa, Mac engaged in an affair with her superior officer John Farrow. Unbeknownst to Mac, Christopher Ragle followed her to Okinawa and discovered the affair. She was stationed in Bosnia and Herzegovina a year before the events in at the start of the second season, at some point with 2nd Battalion, 9th Marines ("Two Nine") for unknown duration, and given the time-line, was likely part of or associated with the Implementation Force (IFOR), following the 1995 Dayton Agreement.

As a major, she was subsequently assigned to JAG headquarters in Falls Church, Virginia when she was pulled off a double homicide investigation to work on a case involving her uncle Colonel Matthew O'Hara (Carmen Argenziano) who had the stolen Declaration of Independence. Lured by her then-boyfriend Dalton Lowne (Larry Poindexter) and the glamour of private legal practice, she resigned her commission to work as an attorney at the White-shoe law firm "Lowell, Hanson and Lowne". However, soon changing her mind after successfully defending Harm pro bono in a court martial, she asked Rear Admiral A.J. Chegwidden (John M. Jackson), Judge Advocate General of the Navy to take her back at JAG. Chegwidden gave her back her letter of resignation, claiming he had been "too busy to process it" (despite having had at least four weeks in which to do so).

When Christopher Ragle (Joe Lando) caught up to Mac at JAG headquarters in 1998, he attempted to use the information regarding her earlier affair with her former superior officer John Farrow (Ben Murphy) to blackmail her for money. Farrow paid Ragle the money he demanded, but Ragle threatened to kill him anyway. Mac tried to wrestle the gun out of Ragle's hand, but it accidentally went off and killed him instead.

Upon her return she was temporarily assigned many menial tasks as in the administrative law department, and was informed by Admiral Chegwidden that he had withdrawn his recommendation for an accelerated promotion. However, Mac was subsequently promoted to lieutenant colonel off-screen between the fourth and fifth seasons, after Admiral Chegwidden's renewal of his recommendation for her accelerated promotion.

Mac bears an uncanny resemblance to Lieutenant Diane Schonke, a United States Naval Academy classmate of Harm who he had been dating before she was murdered, which initially made Harm uneasy, though he soon got past it. However, Mac was unaware of the resemblance until the third season, when Harm had worked out who had really killed Schonke. Harm, Bud, and later, Sturgis Turner, who were aware of the resemblance, had never mentioned it to Mac, who only found out by finding a picture of Schonke in Harm's apartment, in an old shoebox; it was then that Harm told her everything. It was during that same episode that Mac kept Harm from throwing his career away, by inadvertently appearing as the long deceased Diane Schonke, showing up on the pier wearing one of Harriet's spare uniforms.

In addition to European ancestry, Mac also possesses both Cherokee and Iranian ancestry and is fluent in Persian, being capable of recognizing a native Persian speaker by the accent. Her grandmother was a Muslim born in Iran and taught her the basics of Islamic law, although her grandmother was not religious to the degree of ever wearing the abaya, which Mac reluctantly had to wear when she and Harm went outside the perimeters of a U.S. Air Force base while they were on a case in Saudi Arabia. Mac can also speak Russian and German proficiently at near native levels and is able to read an Israeli intelligence report written in Hebrew. Sarah can also get along in Romani. She also always knows the time without ever having to look at a watch or clock and exhibits borderline psychic abilities or extrasensory perception in a few episodes.

Mac has very little chance of having a child due to endometriosis. She and Harm eventually (after years of denial) proclaimed their love to each other. The couple decides to get married in the last episode, further deciding to be fair about who would remain in service, and who would resign, or retire, by way of a coin flip. The outcome of the coin flip was not revealed until 2019.

=== Post JAG ===
Harm and Mac both appeared in the season 10 finale of NCIS: Los Angeles. It is revealed that Harm left the Navy and followed Mac to San Diego after losing the coin flip, but he ended up being drawn back into service sometime later, and they mutually ended their relationship. Mac ended up taking up an assignment as the Marine liaison to the secretary of state, and they had not seen each other for nine years until video conferencing in their new roles. In the season 11 premiere, Harm and Mac reunited in person, where they shared an embrace and later renewed discussion of their relationship, once again without reaching any conclusions.

Later in the season 11 finale, Mac returns seeking the team's help with investigating a Navy SEAL accused of murder and war crimes. She is seen in uniform as a lieutenant colonel (O-5), her rank at the end of JAG, suggesting Mac may now be a member of the Individual Ready Reserve of the Marine Corps Reserve, as Mac would have either been promoted or forced out of the service had she remained on active duty during the intervening 15 years. Her lack of promotion is also inconsistent with the advancement of her former subordinate, Bud Roberts, who by 2016 had been promoted to captain (O-6) as depicted in season 14 of NCIS.

=== Awards and decorations ===
Awards and decorations worn by Lieutenant Colonel Sarah "Mac" MacKenzie, USMC in the 11th season of NCIS: Los Angeles:

Defense Meritorious Service Medal
Meritorious Service Medal, w/1 gold award star (2nd award)	Joint Service Commendation Medal	Navy & Marine Corps Commendation Medal
Navy & Marine Corps Achievement Medal	Combat Action Ribbon	Joint Meritorious Unit Award
Meritorious Unit Commendation	National Defense Service Medal, w/1 bronze service star (2nd award)	Afghanistan Campaign Medal, w/1 bronze service star (2nd award)
Global War on Terrorism Expeditionary Medal	Global War on Terrorism Service Medal	Navy & Marine Corps Overseas Service Ribbon, w/2 bronze service stars (3rd award)
Marine Corps Expert Rifle Badge (2nd award)		Marine Corps Expert Pistol Badge (2nd award)

- Mac was presented her (first) Meritorious Service Medal for organizing the defense and evacuation of a US Consulate in Díli, East Timor, after the Marine Guard Detachment suffered casualties and the consulate is overrun by an angry mob.

== Conceptual history ==
For its second season, JAG moved from NBC to CBS. Bellisario had previously received offers from CBS and ABC to pick up the series, which was reworked to be one of both "legal [drama] and action". Following the departure of series co-star Tracey Needham and also the unavailability of Andrea Parker, who was the female lead in the pilot episode and who had had guest appearances in the first season as Caitlin Pike, due to her starring role on The Pretender, meant that Bellisario had to create a new female lead for the next season.

Catherine Bell made her first appearance in JAG during the season 1 finale playing another character which was killed off in that episode. "It was a really important character for Don Bellisario, who created the show, because Harm was in love with this woman," she said. Bell explained: "I went after the role ... after I had read the breakdown for Mac and they brought me in. The breakdown for Mac was that she would have to be "5′9″ or taller, brown hair, tough and feisty, martial arts experience a plus—that was me," Bell then wrote Bellisario a letter telling him how she "was perfect for Mac, and wouldn’t it be interesting if his new partner looks like the dead love of his life..." "Six callbacks later, I got the role" and "When I finally got the part, Don thanked me for being persistent enough to write the letter." Executive Producer/showrunner Donald P. Bellisario and CBS President Les Moonves "cast Catherine Bell, and [Bellisario] never heard another word from [Moonves] - who took great delight in the fact that it was part of the building block that started the CBS turnaround".

To prepare herself for taking on the role of playing a commissioned officer in the Marine Corps and a judge advocate on network television, "I knew a bit about the Navy before I began the role, but I knew nothing about the Marines," Bell spent time doing research at Camp Pendelton, the principal US Marine Corps base on the West Coast, located between Los Angeles and San Diego, "I met and talked to 20 female Marine officers and got to see what they go through and learn how they feel about the Marines. There's a real sense of honor and integrity among the Marines and I got a real sense of that while I was there. And I got to see some bootcamp training and I was even drilled by a drill [instructor] while I took apart and put back together an M-16. It was tough!" Mac was described by Bell in 1999 as "tough and feisty and a lawyer and an action hero all rolled in one". Bell continued to co-star in JAG as Sarah MacKenzie until the cancellation of the show in April 2005. A possible spin-off/reformat of an 11th season of JAG, centering on Mac's assignment in San Diego was pitched to CBS, but the network passed on the spin-off idea.

Former JAG screenwriter and current NCIS: Los Angeles showrunner R. Scott Gemmill said in a statement when it was revealed in April 2019 that the character of Mac would make guest appearance comeback on NCIS: Los Angeles: "Catherine’s Mac was a strong, smart woman who held her own, and then some, in a male-dominated world. Her character paved the way for other strong female leads" and that "Not only is it great to be working together again as friends, but to be able to write for Catherine and have her same character interact with our NCIS: Los Angeles characters now, that’s wonderfully surreal. It feels like everything has come full circle."

== Reception ==
The similarities in the relationship between Mac and Harm and that of Scully and Mulder on The X-Files has been noted by many. Entertainment Weekly elaborated further on it: in each case it is a "hunky loner", partnered with "attractive women with whom they have a charged yet ultimately platonic relationship", each working for the U.S. Government and based in the DC metropolitan area, with seemingly "unlimited travel budgets": with the key thematic difference being that in JAG with its "red-white-and-blue patriotism" the "U.S. military is seen as a force fighting for good around the world" while in the other series displays "antiauthoritarian cynicism" towards ditto. Time in 2001 described the character of Mac as a "legal babe who didn't wear micro-minis or have sex with random men in car washes a la Ally McBeal". Slate wrote that "Bell as Mac is fine. The character is cute and scrupulous, a recovering alcoholic; for a short time, she had a Southern accent" and as to the will-they-won't-they aspect, it was asserted that episodes "pass with little in the script or the performances to suggest that Harm and Mac are flirting; then, all of a sudden, they're kissing, then promptly forgetting about it".

In 2015, Jayne Reardon, executive director at Illinois Supreme Court Commission on Professionalism, graded several fictional lawyers on scripted drama television as to their display of professional ethics and thus by extension the image of the legal profession in the eyes of the public. Sarah MacKenzie from JAG got the highest grade for "respect for the system and all in it, strictly adhering to military court rules" and that "she proves herself to be a civil and professional lawyer with a strong work ethic".
