= Fly by Night (TV series) =

Canadian adventure series

- Genre: Adventure
- Created by: George Geiger
- Starring: David James Elliott; Shannon Tweed; François Guétary
- Composers: Bob Buckley; David Sinclair
- Countries of origin: France; Canada
- Original language: English
- No. of seasons: 1
- No. of episodes: 13

Production
- Production locations: Vancouver, British Columbia, Canada; French Riviera
- Production companies: Gaumont Television; Alliance Communications Corporation

Original release
- Network: CBS
- Release: April 4 – July 25, 1991

Fly by Night is a Canadian adventure series that aired for one season in 1991 as part of CBS' Crimetime After Primetime programming block in the United States. Co-produced by France, Canada and the U.S., the show stars David James Elliott as Mack Sheppard and François Guétary as Jean-Philippe Pasteur, both pilots for a small-time airline, "Slick Air", owned by Sally "Slick" Monroe (Shannon Tweed).

== Cast ==
- Shannon Tweed as Sally "Slick" Monroe
- David James Elliott as Mack Sheppard
- François Guétary as Jean-Phillipe Pasteur

== Episodes ==
No.	Title	Directed by	Written by	Original release date
1	"Damsel in Distress"	Unknown	Unknown	April 4, 1991
2	"Slim to None"	Unknown	Unknown	April 11, 1991
3	"Funeral in Palermo"	Unknown	Unknown	April 18, 1991
4	"Bing, Bang, Boom"	Hart Hanson	Alan Simmonds	April 25, 1991
5	"Dead Man at Nine O'Clock"	Unknown	Unknown	May 2, 1991
6	"Affaire de Ceour"	Paolo Barzman	Robert W. Gilmer	May 9, 1991
7	"Include Me Out"	Gerard Ciccoritti	Fabrice Ziolkowski	May 16, 1991
8	"Bad to Worse"	Randy Bradshaw	Larry Gaynor	May 23, 1991
9	"The Man Who Knew Nothing at All"	Unknown	Unknown	May 30, 1991
10	"Vanilla Shake"	Unknown	Unknown	June 6, 1991
11	"Furs Flying"	Jean-Pierre Prévost	Matt McLeod	July 11, 1991
12	"Point of No Return"	Unknown	Unknown	July 18, 1991
13	"Manhunt"	Bruno Gantillon	Aaron Barzman	July 25, 1991
