= NCIS: Los Angeles season 11 =

NCIS: Los Angeles
- Season 11
- Season 11 U.S. DVD cover
- Starring: Chris O'Donnell; Daniela Ruah; Eric Christian Olsen; Barrett Foa; Renée Felice Smith; Medalion Rahimi; Linda Hunt; LL Cool J
- No. of episodes: 22

Release
- Original network: CBS
- Original release: September 29, 2019 – April 26, 2020

Season chronology
- ← Previous; Season 10 Next → Season 12

The eleventh season of NCIS: Los Angeles an American police procedural drama television series, premiered on CBS on September 29, 2019, and concluded on April 26, 2020. Only 22 episodes were produced due to the COVID-19 pandemic in the United States. The season is produced by CBS Television Studios.

== Cast and characters ==
=== Main ===
- Chris O'Donnell as Grisha "G." Callen, NCIS Supervisory Special Agent, Team Leader
- Daniela Ruah as Kensi Blye, NCIS Special Agent
- Eric Christian Olsen as Marty Deeks, LAPD/NCIS Liaison Detective
- Barrett Foa as Eric Beale, NCIS Senior Technical Operator
- Renée Felice Smith as Nell Jones, NCIS Special Agent and Intelligence Analyst
- Medalion Rahimi as Fatima Namazi, NCIS Special Agent, (episode 16 onwards; episodes 1–7, recurring)
- Linda Hunt as Henrietta Lange, NCIS Supervisory Special Agent (SSA) and Operations Manager
- LL Cool J as Sam Hanna, NCIS Senior Field Agent, Second in Command

=== Recurring ===
- Peter Jacobson as John Rogers, Special Prosecutor
- Gerald McRaney as Hollace Kilbride, Retired Navy Admiral
- Pamela Reed as Roberta Deeks, Marty Deeks' Mother
- Erik Palladino as CIA Officer Vostanik Sabatino
- Moon Bloodgood as Katherine Casillas
- Marsha Thomason as Nicole DeChamps, NCIS Special Agent, Former Secret Service Special Agent
- Bar Paly as Anastasia "Anna" Kolcheck, former ATF Agent, Callen's girlfriend
- Vyto Ruginis as Arkady Kolcheck
- Caleb Castille as FBI Special Agent Devin Roundtree

=== Special guest stars ===
- David James Elliott as Harmon Rabb, Navy Captain
- Catherine Bell as Sarah "Mac" MacKenzie, Marine LtCol. Liaison to the Secretary of State

=== Notable guest stars ===
- Kiari "Offset" Cephus as Kadri Kashan Khan
- Bill Goldberg as Lance Hamilton, DOJ Agent
- Alyssa Diaz as Jasmine Garcia, NCIS Special Agent
- Gil Birmingham as Navy Captain Steven Douglas
- Wesam Keesh as NCIS Special Agent-afloat Eshan Navid
- Vinnie Jones as Ricky Dorsey
- Steve Valentine as Frankie Bolton
- Dina Meyer as Veronica Stephens
- Malese Jow as Jennifer Kim
- Anna Belknap as Fake NCIS Special Agent Robin Ip
- Shane McMahon as Steve Evans, Army CID Special Agent
- Nitya Vidyasagar as Natasha
- Carl Beukes as Akhos Laos
- Arielle Vandenberg as Mara

== Episodes ==
No. overall	No. in season	Title	Directed by	Written by	Original release date	Prod. code	U.S. viewers (millions)
241	1	"Let Fate Decide"	Christine Moore	Kyle Harimoto	September 29, 2019	1025	6.44
icon
242	2	"Decoy"	Dennis Smith	Kyle Harimoto	October 6, 2019	1101	6.70
icon
243	3	"Hail Mary"	Benny Boom	R. Scott Gemmill & Frank Military	October 13, 2019	1026	6.63
Admiral Kilbride requests the team's assistance to help rescue an abducted Naval intelligence officer - but the team gets annoyed by him withholding information.
244	4	"Yellow Jack"	Terrence O'Hara	Andrew Bartels	October 20, 2019	1102	6.40
icon
245	5	"Provenance"	Lily Mariye	Jordana Lewis Jaffe	October 27, 2019	1103	6.09
icon
246	6	"A Bloody Brilliant Plan"	Terence Nightingall	Teleplay by : Frank Military; Story by : Terence Nightingall & Kate D. Martin & Frank Military	November 3, 2019	1104	5.71
icon
247	7	"Concours D'Elegance"	Yangzom Brauen	Lee A. Carlisle	November 10, 2019	1105	6.04
icon
248	8	"Human Resources"	James Hanlon	Joe Sachs	November 17, 2019	1106	6.51
The team's investigation into a Navy lieutenant's abduction leads them to a wannabe bomber.
249	9	"Kill Beale: Vol. 1"	Eric A. Pot	Samantha Chasse & R. Scott Gemmill	November 24, 2019	1107	6.35
When Eric's apartment in San Francisco is attacked, Callen and Sam head out there to locate Eric before it's too late while Kensi and Nell discover the truth behind Eric's second job.
250	10	"Mother"	Dennis Smith	Eric Christian Olsen & Babar Peerzada	December 1, 2019	1108	6.42
icon
251	11	"Answers"	Frank Military	Kyle Harimoto	December 8, 2019	1109	6.42
icon
252	12	"Groundwork"	Benny Boom	Erin Broadhurst	January 5, 2020	1110	5.72
icon
253	13	"High Society"	John Peter Kousakis	Chad Mazero	January 12, 2020	1111	6.37
icon
254	14	"Commitment Issues"	James Hanlon	Jordana Lewis Jaffe	February 16, 2020	1112	6.05
icon
255	15	"The Circle"	Diana C. Valentine	Andrew Bartels	February 23, 2020	1113	6.20
icon
256	16	"Alsiyadun"	Dennis Smith	R. Scott Gemmill	March 1, 2020	1114	6.49
icon
257	17	"Watch Over Me"	Dan Liu	Kyle Harimoto	March 8, 2020	1115	6.56
icon
258	18	"Missing Time"	Yangzom Brauen	Andrew Bartels	March 22, 2020	1116	7.44
icon
259	19	"Fortune Favors the Brave"	Eric A. Pot	R. Scott Gemmill	March 29, 2020	1117	7.01
icon
260	20	"Knock Down"	Tony Wharmby	Jordana Lewis Jaffe	April 12, 2020	1118	6.77
icon
261	21	"Murder of Crows"	Suzanne Saltz	Chad Mazero	April 19, 2020	1120	6.89
icon
262	22	"Code of Conduct"	Frank Military	Frank Military	April 26, 2020	1119	5.26
Note: This episode serves as the de facto season finale due to the COVID-19 pandemic.

== Production ==
=== Development ===
NCIS: Los Angeles was renewed for an eleventh season on April 22, 2019. In March 2020, CBS announced that the season's production had been delayed due to the COVID-19 pandemic. As a consequence of this, season eleven's episode order was reduced from 24 to 22.

=== Casting ===
In February 2020, Medalion Rahimi, who plays NCIS Special Agent Fatima Namazi, was promoted to a series regular in the middle of the season.

== Broadcast ==
Season eleven of NCIS: Los Angeles premiered on September 29, 2019.

In the United Kingdom, Season Eleven of NCIS: Los Angeles premiered on Sunday December 29, 2019, and concluded on Sunday May 31, 2020.

== Reception ==
=== Ratings ===
Viewership and ratings per episode of NCIS: Los Angeles season 11
No.	Title	Air date	Rating/share (18–49)	Viewers (millions)	DVR (18–49)	DVR viewers (millions)	Total (18–49)	Total viewers (millions)
1	"Let Fate Decide"	September 29, 2019	0.8/4	6.44	0.5	2.76	1.3	9.20
2	"Decoy"	October 6, 2019	0.7/3	6.70	0.4	2.70	1.1	9.40
3	"Hail Mary"	October 13, 2019	0.8/4	6.63	0.4	2.65	1.2	9.28
4	"Yellow Jack"	October 20, 2019	0.7/3	6.40	0.3	2.41	1.0	8.81
5	"Provenance"	October 27, 2019	0.7/3	6.09	0.4	2.62	1.1	8.71
6	"A Bloody Brilliant Plan"	November 3, 2019	0.6/3	5.71	0.3	2.45	0.9	8.16
7	"Concours D'Elegance"	November 10, 2019	0.6/3	6.04	0.4	2.56	1.0	8.60
8	"Human Resources"	November 17, 2019	0.7/4	6.51	0.4	2.48	1.1	8.99
9	"Kill Beale Vol. 1"	November 24, 2019	0.7/3	6.35	0.4	2.34	1.0	8.69
10	"Mother"	December 1, 2019	0.8/3	6.42	0.4	2.60	1.2	9.02
11	"Answers"	December 8, 2019	0.7/4	6.42	0.4	2.57	1.1	8.99
12	"Groundwork"	January 5, 2020	0.5/3	5.72	0.4	2.44	0.9	8.16
13	"High Society"	January 12, 2020	0.8/4	6.37	0.4	2.52	1.2	8.89
14	"Commitment Issues"	February 16, 2020	0.6/3	6.05	0.4	2.75	1.0	8.80
15	"The Circle"	February 23, 2020	0.6/3	6.20	0.4	2.57	1.0	8.77
16	"Alsiyadun"	March 1, 2020	0.7/3	6.49	0.4	2.48	1.1	8.97
17	"Watch Over Me"	March 8, 2020	0.6/4	6.56	0.4	2.29	1.0	8.86
18	"Missing Time"	March 22, 2020	0.8/3	7.44	0.3	2.41	1.1	9.85
19	"Fortune Favors the Brave"	March 29, 2020	0.7/3	7.01	0.4	2.28	1.1	9.29
20	"Knock Down"	April 12, 2020	0.7/3	6.77	0.4	2.28	1.1	9.20
21	"Murder of Crows"	April 19, 2020	0.6/2	6.89	0.4	2.46	1.0	9.36
22	"Code of Conduct"	April 26, 2020	0.5	5.26	0.4	2.73	0.9	8.00

== Home media ==
NCIS: Los Angeles: The Eleventh Season
Set details	Special features	
Discs: 5; Episodes: 22; Media Format: NTSC, Subtitled, Widescreen; Run time: 15 hours and 26 minutes	Mother: The 250th Episode; On Set, "Offset"; Season 11 An Evolution; Deleted/Extended Scenes	
DVD release dates
Region 1	Region 2	Region 4
August 4, 2020	UK: 17 August 2020 Europe: TBA	N/A
