= Nanci Chambers =

American actress

- Born: 1963; Thunder Bay, Ontario
- Occupation: Actress
- Years active: 1983–2008
- Spouse: David James Elliott (m. 1992)
- Children: 2

Nanci Chambers Smith is a Canadian former actress.

== Biography ==
Nanci Chambers was born in Thunder Bay, Ontario, Canada in 1963. She is perhaps best known for her role as the ambitious Lieutenant Loren Singer on her husband's television series JAG. Chambers has been a board member of the organisation "A Better LA". Nanci and her husband are staunch environmental conservationists, having often spent time in Ecuador learning about the tribes and rainforest. The couple sold their house in Palm Desert for US$1.1 million, since they were unable to spend time there. Chambers has been involved in the All-American Heavyweights.

== Personal life ==
Chambers married actor David James Elliott in 1992. They have a daughter, Stephanie (b. 1993) and a son, Wyatt (b. 2003).

== Filmography ==
- Ghost Whisperer (TV) (2008) .... Terry
- The Stranger I Married (TV) (2005) .... Dr. Janice Golding
- Code 11-14 (TV) (2003) .... Det. Andrea McInroy
- JAG (TV) (40 episodes) (1997–2003) .... Lt. Loren Singer/Megan O'Hara/Jojo
- Dodson's Journey (2001) (TV) .... Becky
- Beyond Belief: Fact or Fiction (TV) (Curse) (2000) .... Dr. Marian John
- L.A. Heat (TV) (Death House) (1999) TV episode .... Jane Clark
- Street Legal (TV) (The Legacy of Stanley Wall) (1991) .... Nick's Girlfriend
- Screwballs (1983) .... Trisha
