= NCIS: Los Angeles season 10 =

NCIS: Los Angeles
- Season 10
- Season 10 U.S. DVD cover
- Starring: Chris O'Donnell; Daniela Ruah; Eric Christian Olsen; Barrett Foa; Renée Felice Smith; Nia Long; Linda Hunt; LL Cool J
- No. of episodes: 24

Release
- Original network: CBS
- Original release: September 30, 2018 – May 19, 2019

Season chronology
- ← Previous; Season 9 Next → Season 11

The tenth season of NCIS: Los Angeles an American police procedural drama television series, originally aired on CBS from September 30, 2018, through May 19, 2019. The season was produced by CBS Television Studios, with R. Scott Gemmill as showrunner and executive producer.

The season featured the return of David James Elliot and Catherine Bell as Harmon Rabb and Sarah MacKenzie from JAG; it also revealed the outcome of the JAG series finale in 2005. This was also the last season to feature Nia Long as Shay Mosley.

For the 2018–19 U.S. television season, the tenth season of NCIS: Los Angeles ranked #28 with an average of 9.85 million viewers.

== Cast and characters ==
=== Main ===
- Chris O'Donnell as Grisha "G." Callen, NCIS Supervisory Special Agent
- Daniela Ruah as Kensi Blye, NCIS Junior Field Agent
- Eric Christian Olsen as Marty Deeks, LAPD/NCIS Liaison Detective
- Barrett Foa as Eric Beale, NCIS Technical Operator
- Renée Felice Smith as Nell Jones, NCIS Special Agent and Intelligence Analyst
- Nia Long as Shay Mosley, NCIS Executive Assistant Director for Pacific Operations (EADPAC) (episodes 1–6)
- Linda Hunt as Henrietta Lange, NCIS Supervisory Special Agent (SSA) and Operations Manager
- LL Cool J as Sam Hanna, NCIS Senior Field Agent, Second in Command

=== Recurring ===
- Esai Morales as Louis Occhoa, NCIS Deputy Director
- Vyto Ruginis as Arkady Kolcheck
- Bar Paly as Anastasia "Anna" Kolcheck, an ATF agent, Arkady's daughter and Callen's girlfriend.
- Elizabeth Bogush as Joelle Taylor, CIA agent
- Gerald McRaney as Hollace Kilbride, retired Navy admiral
- Erik Palladino as CIA Officer Vostanik Sabatino
- Marsha Thomason as Nicole DeChamps, NCIS Special Agent, former Secret Service special agent
- Peter Jacobson as John Rogers, special prosecutor
- Max Martini as Arlo Turk
- Karina Logue as LAPD Detective Ellen Whiting
- Paulina Olszynski as Tiffany Williams
- Pamela Reed as Roberta Deeks
- Douglas Weston as Alex Elmslie
- Laura Harring as Julia Feldman
- Medalion Rahimi as NCIS Special Agent Fatima Namazi
- Ravil Isyanov as Anatoli Kirkin
- Mercedes Mason as Talia Del Campo
- Daniel J. Travanti as Nikita Aleksandr Reznikov / Garrison, Callen's father

=== Special Guest Stars ===
- David James Elliot as Harmon Rabb
- Catherine Bell as Sarah MacKenzie

=== Notable guest stars ===
- Bill Goldberg as Lance Hamilton, DOJ Agent
- TJ Ramini as Tobin Shaked
- Shane McMahon as Steve Evans, Army CID Special Agent
- Alyssa Diaz as Jasmine Garcia
- Gil Birmingham as Navy Captain Steven Douglas
- Dina Meyer as Veronica Stephens
- Eve Harlow as Kate Miller/Katya

== Episodes ==
No. overall	No. in season	Title	Directed by	Written by	Original release date	Prod. code	U.S. viewers (millions)
217	1	"To Live and Die in Mexico"	Frank Military	Frank Military	September 30, 2018	1001	8.75
With their vehicle hit by a rocket launcher, the badly-injured team must find their way to safety while evading cartel forces that want them dead. Meanwhile, the fate of Agent Hidoko is learned.
218	2	"Superhuman"	Dennis Smith	Kyle Harimoto	October 7, 2018	1002	7.54
While Callen remains on medical leave following the Mexico mission (and Hetty and Mosley facing the consequences), the rest of the team searches for a bank robber armed with a prototype Navy armored suit.
219	3	"The Prince"	Lily Mariye	Andrew Bartels	October 14, 2018	1003	7.63
The team supplements the protection of a Saudi prince after a convoy with his decoy is attacked, but things get complicated when the attempted assassin is revealed to be Joelle Taylor.
220	4	"Hit List"	Eric A. Pot	R. Scott Gemmill	October 21, 2018	1005	8.35
The team discovers they have become targets of the cartel, along with Mosley and her son; Mosley faces a prosecutor digging into the unsanctioned Mexico op. At the end of episode, Callen receives a call from Hetty and informs him she will be gone for some time.
221	5	"Pro Se"	Benny Boom	Jordana Lewis Jaffe	October 28, 2018	1004	7.19
After an NCIS informant is arrested on bogus charges, the team works to get the case dropped while working the case their informant had been helping with.
222	6	"Asesinos"	Terrence O'Hara	R. Scott Gemmill	November 4, 2018	1006	7.04
After being lured into a trap one night at a hotel, Former executive assistant director Mosley goes from being hunted to being the hunter. Her mission, drive a wedge between dueling mexican cartels who are looking to cash in on the $1 million bounty placed on her and her son, Derrick. With NCIS close behind, Mosley plays one last card: a trade.
223	7	"One of Us"	Dennis Smith	Kyle Harimoto	November 11, 2018	1007	6.85
The team investigates a murder that turns out to be the result of a professional hitman with a vendetta; Anna awaits her sentencing for the murder of Sokolov.
224	8	"The Patton Project"	Ruba Nadda	Frank Military	November 18, 2018	1008	7.22
NCIS is called upon by a former Mossad agent to locate and stop a terrorist attack by the Patton Project. After failing to accomplish their mission, Patton Project agents now look to a former Al- Queda tactic, recruit members of psychiatric hospitals to act as suicide bombers. With their reputation still under scrutiny, NCIS must toe the line between a black ops unit or law enforcement.
225	9	"A Diamond in the Rough"	James Hanlon	Chad Mazero	November 25, 2018	1009	7.20
icon
226	10	"Heist"	Yangzom Brauen	Jordana Lewis Jaffe	December 9, 2018	1010	7.50
Following a bank heist resulting in the theft of a Navy contractor's safety deposit box, the team investigates the contractor to see just what was worth stealing - all while dealing with Special Prosecutor Rogers watching over them.
227	11	"Joyride"	Tawnia McKiernan	Erin Broadhurst	December 16, 2018	1011	7.21
icon
228	12	"The Sound of Silence"	Terence Nightingall	Joe Sachs	January 6, 2019	1012	7.59
icon
229	13	"Better Angels"	Diana C. Valentine	Frank Military	January 13, 2019	1013	8.31
After a witness with information regarding the use of chemical weapons in Syria is hit with a car, the team must work with Turk and the Global Tribunal to find the USB drive containing vital evidence while Kensi stays with the man as he faces death from his wounds.
230	14	"Smokescreen"	Dennis Smith	Andrew Bartels	January 27, 2019	1014	6.75
icon
231	15	"Smokescreen, Part II"	Sherwin Shilati	Matt Klafter & Kyle Harimoto	February 17, 2019	1015	6.74
Following a terrorist attack at a theater, the team's search for those responsible leads them to uncover the attack was merely a false flag operation.
232	16	"Into the Breach"	James Hanlon	Lee A. Carlisle	March 3, 2019	1016	6.97
The team's latest investigation leads them to uncover a story about a botched military op; Deeks' bar gets a health inspection.
233	17	"Till Death Do Us Part"	Tony Wharmby	R. Scott Gemmill	March 17, 2019	1017	8.47
The team prepare to celebrate the long awaited wedding day of Kensi and Deeks, but encounter problems in the unexpected arrival of Anatoli Kirkin. The mysterious contents of the Box is revealed, Hetty returns and Kensi and Deeks finally get married.
234	18	"Born to Run"	Lily Mariye	Jordana Lewis Jaffe	March 24, 2019	1018	7.16
Sydney drags Nell along when a high school classmate of theirs is targeted by unknown assassins while the rest of the team believes he is the prime suspect in the murder of a Naval officer guarding a top-secret project.
235	19	"Searching"	Terrence O'Hara	Adam George Key & Kyle Harimoto	March 31, 2019	1019	7.50
Deeks, Kensi, Eric, Callen, and Nell have a day off to do their own thing. Deeks and Kensi prepare the bar for a fundraiser while Callen recovers from a gunshot wound and bonds with his sister Alex's son. Eric and Nell make plans to go to San Francisco for Eric's job interview. It is revealed that Nell's mom has heart disease and her entire family is looking to move to San Francisco for a new treatment. Sam teams up with DOJ Agent Hamilton and Fatima to chase down a Texas drug lord who supposedly abducted the family of the federal agent who killed his son.
236	20	"Choke Point"	James Whitmore Jr.	Joe Sachs & R. Scott Gemmill	April 14, 2019	1020	6.79
After a Navy Seal who worked as a security guard at a marijuana dispensary is attacked, the team's investigation leads them to a potential mass shooting.
237	21	"The One That Got Away"	Eric A. Pot	Andrew Bartels & Erin Broadhurst	April 28, 2019	1021	5.66
Anna and her cellmate escape from prison, leading OSP to assist in locating them to avoid a potential bloodbath.
238	22	"No More Secrets"	Yangzom Brauen	Andrew Bartels & Erin Broadhurst	May 5, 2019	1022	4.95
icon
239	23	"The Guardian"	John Peter Kousakis	R. Scott Gemmill	May 12, 2019	1023	5.98
When the team uncovers a terror threat on military locations, Callen and Sam travel to the Persian Gulf to work with the Executive Officer of the USS Allegiance aircraft carrier, Navy Captain Harmon Rabb, Jr., to identify and thwart Chechen sleeper agents colluding with ISIS.
240	24	"False Flag"	Dennis Smith	Frank Military	May 19, 2019	1024	5.28
Callen, Hanna, and Rabb detain several terror suspects onboard the Allegiance but are simultaneously forced to deal with Iranian forces amassing on the Iraqi border. The Marine Liaison to the U.S. Secretary of State, LtCol. Sarah "Mac" MacKenzie, helps the rest of the team untangle a complicated spy web involving a crooked Russian Consul, Chechen terrorists, and an increasingly meddlesome ISIS. Jasmine Garcia is brought into Ops by Hetty to support Eric, who is conflicted between being with Nell and her mother in a San Diego hospital and scrambling to neutralize the terror threat and prevent World War III.

== Production ==
=== Development ===
NCIS: Los Angeles was renewed for a 24-episode tenth season on April 18, 2018.

=== Casting ===
Linda Hunt took time off from this season while recovering from a car accident.

== Broadcast ==
Season ten of NCIS: Los Angeles premiered on September 30, 2018.

== Reception ==
=== Ratings ===
Viewership and ratings per episode of NCIS: Los Angeles season 10
No.	Title	Air date	Rating/share (18–49)	Viewers (millions)	DVR (18–49)	DVR viewers (millions)	Total (18–49)	Total viewers (millions)
1	"To Live and Die in Mexico"	September 30, 2018	1.1/4	8.75	0.7	2.70	1.5	11.46
2	"Superhuman"	October 7, 2018	0.8/3	7.54	0.6	2.76	1.4	10.31
3	"The Prince"	October 14, 2018	1.0/5	7.63	—N/a	2.65	—N/a	10.29
4	"Hit List"	October 21, 2018	1.1/5	8.35	—N/a	2.68	—N/a	11.04
5	"Pro Se"	October 28, 2018	0.8/3	7.19	0.5	2.54	1.3	9.73
6	"Asesinos"	November 4, 2018	0.7/3	7.04	0.5	2.88	1.3	9.93
7	"One of Us"	November 11, 2018	0.8/3	6.85	0.6	2.82	1.4	9.68
8	"The Patton Project"	November 18, 2018	0.8/3	7.22	0.5	2.61	1.3	9.84
9	"A Diamond in the Rough"	November 25, 2018	0.9/4	7.20	0.7	2.94	1.4	10.15
10	"Heist"	December 9, 2018	0.9/4	7.50	0.5	2.75	1.3	10.25
11	"Joyride"	December 16, 2018	0.9/4	7.21	0.7	2.75	1.3	9.97
12	"The Sound of Silence"	January 6, 2019	0.9/4	7.59	0.5	2.87	1.4	10.46
13	"Better Angels"	January 13, 2019	0.9/4	8.31	0.4	2.54	1 4	10.85
14	"Smokescreen"	January 27, 2019	0.8/3	6.75	0.5	2.76	1.3	9.51
15	"Smokescreen, Part II"	February 17, 2019	0.7/3	6.74	0.5	2.74	1.2	9.49
16	"Into the Breach"	March 3, 2019	0.9/4	6.97	0.5	2.83	1.4	9.81
17	"Till Death Do Us Part"	March 17, 2019	0.9/4	8.47	0.5	2.99	1.4	11.46
18	"Born to Run"	March 24, 2019	0.9/4	7.16	0.4	2.40	1.2	9.57
19	"Searching"	March 31, 2019	1.0/4	7.50	0.3	2.36	1.3	9.86
20	"Choke Point"	April 14, 2019	0.7/3	6.79	0.4	2.64	1.1	9.44
21	"The One That Got Away"	April 28, 2019	0.6/3	5.66	0.4	2.93	1.0	8.60
22	"No More Secrets"	May 5, 2019	0.5/3	4.95	0.4	2.59	0.9	7.54
23	"The Guardian"	May 12, 2019	0.6/3	5.98	0.5	2.85	1.1	8.83
24	"False Flag"	May 19, 2019	0.5/2	5.28	0.5	2.99	1.0	8.27

== Home media ==
NCIS: Los Angeles: The Tenth Season
Set details	Special features	
24 episodes; 6 discs; Media Format: NTSC, Subtitled; Run time: 16 hours and 52 minutes		
DVD release dates
Region 1	Region 2	Region 4
August 27, 2019	UK: 23 September 2019; EU: TBA	August 28, 2019
