= TV Guide Award =

Annual award prior to 1964, and again from 1999-2001

- Description: Readers poll honoring outstanding television programs and performers
- Country: United States
- Presented by: TV Guide Magazine

The TV Guide Award was an annual award created by the editors of TV Guide magazine, as a readers poll to honor outstanding programs and performers in the American television industry. The awards were presented until 1964. The TV Guide Award was revived 1999–2001.

== 1950s ==
Ellery Queen won a TV Guide Award in 1950 for Best Mystery Show on Television. The Lucky Strike ads of the early 1950s won the first TV Guide award as commercial of the year. The trophy was a bronze statuette of a heroic figure holding a filigree globe. The 1952 TV Guide Magazine award was given to Zoo Parade, which also won the 1950 George Foster Peabody Award and the 1951 Look TV Award. American Bandstand was featured on its second anniversary in the Philadelphia issue of TV Guide, which said it was "the people's choice" for a 1954 TV Guide award. The magazine had been founded the year before by Walter Annenberg, owner of American Bandstand.

== 1960–64 ==
In 1961 the TV Guide Award was cited by the Associated Press as one of the three important entertainment awards, together with the Academy Awards and the Emmy Awards. Ballots were printed in a single issue of the magazine. Completed ballots were submitted by U.S. Mail and tabulated by direct-mail specialists Cassidy-Richlar, Inc.

=== 1960 awards ===
The TV Guide Award Show was broadcast in color on March 25, 1960, on NBC. Robert Young hosted a series of skits featuring Fred MacMurray and Nanette Fabray. Seven awards were presented in the final ten minutes of the show. Recipients were chosen based on 289,000 ballots submitted by readers of TV Guide.

Category	Recipient	Notes
Favorite Series of One Hour or Longer	Perry Mason	
Favorite Half-Hour Series	Father Knows Best	
Best Single Musical or Variety Program	Another Evening with Fred Astaire	
Most Popular Male Personality	Raymond Burr	Perry Mason
Most Popular Female Personality	Loretta Young	The Loretta Young Show
Best News or Information Program	The Huntley-Brinkley Report	
Best Single Dramatic Program	"The Turn of the Screw"	Startime

=== 1961 awards ===
Broadcast on NBC, the second annual TV Guide Award Show was presented June 13, 1961. The hour-long program was hosted by Efrem Zimbalist, Jr., with comedy sketches featuring Jackie Cooper and Nanette Fabray. NBC-TV was recognized for its 1960 election night coverage, and the following awards were presented.

Category	Recipient	Notes
Favorite Series	Perry Mason	
Favorite New Series	The Andy Griffith Show	
Best Single Musical or Variety Program	Sing Along with Mitch	
Favorite Male Performer	Raymond Burr	Perry Mason
Favorite Female Performer	Carol Burnett	The Garry Moore Show
Best News or Information Program	The Huntley-Brinkley Report	
Best Single Dramatic Program	"Macbeth"	Hallmark Hall of Fame

=== 1962 awards ===
The third annual TV Guide Award Show was broadcast June 24, 1962, on NBC. Hosted by Dave Garroway, the program included sketches featuring Art Carney and special guest Judy Holliday. In a brief concluding segment, awards in eight categories were presented.

Category	Recipient	Notes
Favorite Series	Bonanza	
Favorite New Series	Ben Casey	
Best Single Musical or Variety Program	The Bob Hope Christmas Show	
Favorite Male Performer	Vince Edwards	Ben Casey
Favorite Female Performer	Carol Burnett	The Garry Moore Show
Best News or Information Program	The Huntley-Brinkley Report	
Best Single News or Information Program	NBC-TV coverage of John Glenn's orbital space flight	
Best Single Dramatic Program	"The Prince and the Pauper"	Walt Disney's Wonderful World of Color

=== 1963 awards ===
The fourth TV Guide Award presentation was made during the NBC special, The Bob Hope Show Presenting the TV Guide Awards, broadcast April 14, 1963. The 45-minute comedy and variety portion of the show featured Dean Martin and Martha Raye. Eight awards were presented in the concluding segment of the show, with live pickups in New York and Hollywood.

Category	Recipient	Notes
Favorite Series	Bonanza	
Favorite New Series	The Beverly Hillbillies	
Best Single Musical or Variety Program	The Bob Hope Christmas Show	
Favorite Male Performer	Richard Chamberlain	Dr. Kildare
Favorite Female Performer	Carol Burnett	
Best News or Information Program	The Huntley-Brinkley Report	
Best Single News or Information Program	"The Tunnel"	
Best Children's Series	Walt Disney's Wonderful World of Color	

=== 1964 awards ===
The fifth TV Guide Award presentation was made on a special presentation of Bob Hope's NBC-TV show on April 17, 1964.

Category	Recipient	Notes
Favorite Series	Dr. Kildare	
Favorite New Series	The Fugitive	
Best Single Dramatic, Musical or Variety Program	"Tyger, Tyger" (two-part episode)	Dr. Kildare
Favorite Male Performer	David Janssen	The Fugitive
Favorite Female Performer	Inger Stevens	The Farmer's Daughter
Best News or Information Program	The Huntley-Brinkley Report	
Best Single News or Information Program	ABC 1964 Winter Olympics coverage	

== 1999–2001 ==
The TV Guide Award was revived in 1999. Categories included traditional awards like Favorite Actor in a Comedy, Favorite Actor in a Drama Series, Favorite Star in a New Series, Favorite Drama Series, and Favorite Comedy Series, to more off-beat categories which differed by year and are listed below. The winners were voted on by readers via magazine ballots and on-line voting. Each of these three award ceremonies were broadcast on Fox. The first award ceremony was televised on February 1, 1999 with 1.2 million fans voting. The second ceremony was aired on March 5, 2000, with 1.6 million fans voting. The third and final ceremony was aired on March 7, 2001, with 1.5 million fans voting, at which point the award was discontinued.

Among the many winners were Melina Kanakaredes, David Duchovny, Tim Allen, Roma Downey, Jenna Elfman, David James Elliott, Martin Sheen, Bette Midler, Regis Philbin, Sean Hayes, and Noah Wyle.

=== Select categories ===
- Favorite Actor in a Comedy
- Favorite Actress in a Comedy
- Favorite Actor in a Drama
- Favorite Actress in a Drama
- Favorite Comedy Series
- Favorite Drama Series
- Favorite Sportscaster
- Favorite Sci-Fi/Fantasy Show
- Favorite TV Pet
- Favorite Teen Character
- Scariest Villain
- Best Kiss
- Sexiest Male
- Sexiest Female
- Best Dressed Male
- Best Dressed Female
- Favorite Teen Show
- Favorite Comeback
- Favorite Music Show
- Favorite Men's Hair-Do
- Favorite Women's Hair-Do
- Favorite TV Theme Song
- Best Show You're Not Watching
- Editor's Choice
- Favorite Children's Show
- Favorite Daytime Talk Show
- Favorite Game Show
- Favorite Late Night Show
- Favorite News Personality
- Favorite News Program
- Favorite Reality TV
- Favorite Soap Opera
- Favorite TV Movie or Miniseries
- Favorite New Series
- Favorite Star of a New Series
- Favorite Ensemble
- Favorite Frenemies
- Favorite TV Couple
- Favorite TV Sidekick
- Favorite Duo
