= Chris Beetem =

American film and television actor

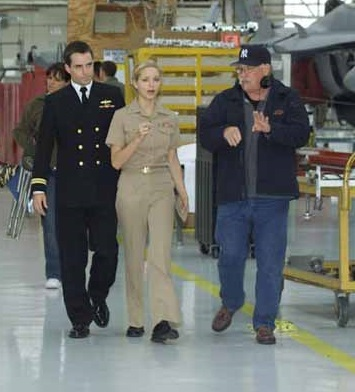
- Chris Beetem (left) goes over a scene for JAG with Jordana Spiro and director Vern Gillum in 2005.
- Born: Christopher Lapinski; August 8, 1970 (age 56); Philadelphia, Pennsylvania, U.S.
- Years active: 1998–present

Chris Beetem (born Christopher Lapinski; August 8, 1970) is an American film and television actor. He is known for his roles in films such as Black Hawk Down, Every Day and Mr. Popper's Penguins. Beetem is also known for his roles in As the World Turns, One Tree Hill, JAG and Pan Am.

== Career ==
Beetem attended Philadelphia High School for Creative and Performing Arts.

Beetem played Jordan Sinclair on the daytime soap opera As the World Turns from 2004 to 2005, serial killer Tate Harmon on One Life to Live from February to August 2007, and Congressman Chris Rawlings on the prime time drama Pan Am from 2011 to 2012.

== Filmography ==
=== Film ===
Year	Title	Role	Notes
2001	Black Hawk Down	SGT Casey Joyce	
2009	Once More with Feeling	Officer Murray	
2010	Every Day	Eric	
2010	Weakness	Doug	
2011	Trophy Kids	Derrick Pierce	
2011	Mr. Popper's Penguins	Young Developer	
2014	Lullaby	Sean	
2015	Emelie	Dan	
2016	Claire in Motion	Paul Hunger	
2016	A Bear Lands on Earth	DC Deon Tex	
2017	Maggie Black	Tom	
2017	Middleground	Husband	
2018	The Rainbow Experiment	Jamie Freeman	
2019	Tales of an American Hoodrat	Uncle Garrity	

=== Television ===
Year	Title	Role	Notes
1998	Law & Order	Mark Tyner	Episode: "Punk"
1998	Grace and Glorie	Roy Stiles	Television film
2000	Deadline	Wentzel	3 episodes
2001, 2018	Law & Order: Special Victims Unit	Alan Buckley / Joe Templeton Jr.	2 episodes
2004-2005	As the World Turns	Jordan Sinclair	
2005	JAG	Lt. Gregory Vukovic	8 episodes
2006	Related	Dr. Polumbo	Episode: "The Move"
2006	CSI: Miami	Keith Murray	Episode: "Open Water"
2007	One Life to Live	Tate Harmon	52 episodes
2008	Cashmere Mafia	Cashmere Mafia	2 episodes
2008	One Tree Hill	Dr. Ethan Copeland	3 episodes
2008	The Verdict	Michael	Television film
2009, 2012	CBS Cares	—N/a	2 episodes
2010	Blue Bloods	Matthew Restin	Episode: "Chinatown"
2011–2012	Pan Am	Chris Rawlings	3 episodes
2012	Unforgettable	Duane Tate	Episode: "Carrie's Caller"
2012	Royal Pains	Jim	Episode: "About Face"
2012	Made in Jersey	Mason Burch	Episode: "Camelot"
2013	Orange Is the New Black	Mark Payne	Episode: "Fool Me Once"
2013–2016	Inside Amy Schumer	Various roles	6 episodes
2015	The Following	Corey	Episode: "The Hunt"
2016	Blindspot	Jeremy Rance	Episode: "Swift Hardhearted Stone"
2016	Bull	John Phillips	Episode: "Never Saw the Sign"
