= David James Elliott =

Canadian actor (born 1960)

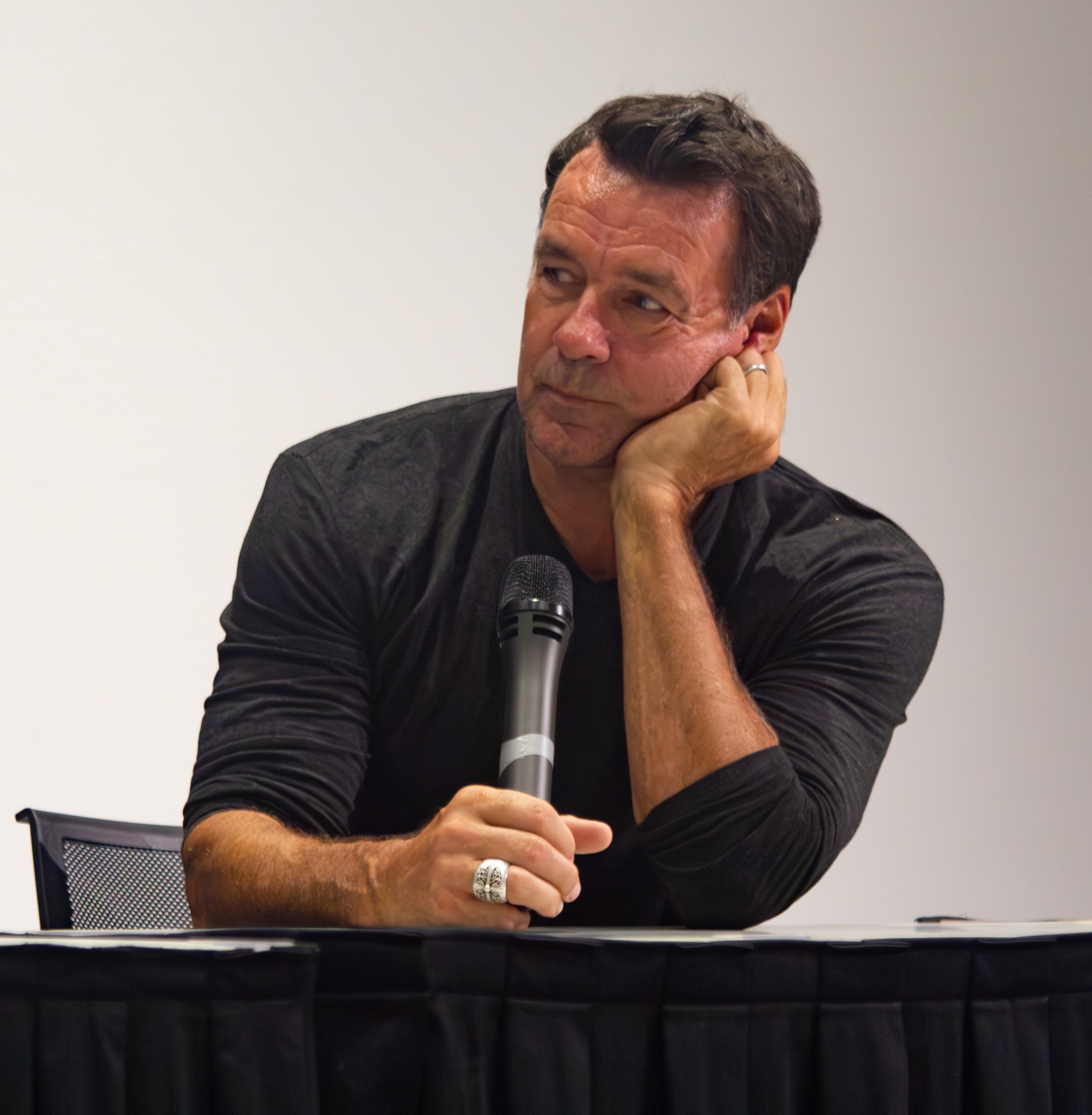
- Elliott in 2026
- Born: David William Smith; September 21, 1960 (age 66); Milton, Ontario, Canada
- Occupation: Actor
- Years active: 1986–present
- Spouse: Nanci Chambers (m. 1992)
- Children: 2

David William Smith (born September 21, 1960), known professionally as David James Elliott, is a Canadian actor. He was the star of the series JAG, playing lead character Harmon Rabb Jr. from 1995 to 2005.

== Early life ==
Elliott was born David William Smith on September 21, 1960, in Milton, Ontario, Canada, the son of Patricia Smith (née Farrow), an office manager, and Arnold Smith, a heating and plumbing wholesale contractor. He was born the second of three boys. During his teenaged years, he was part of a band, quitting Milton District High School in his final year to pursue his dream of becoming a rock star. At age 19, though, he realized this would not happen and returned to finish high school.

After graduating from high school, he attended Ryerson University in Toronto, graduating in 1982. He joined the Stratford Shakespearean Festival in Ontario as a member of its Young Company.

== Career ==
Subsequently, moving to Los Angeles, he took the stage name David James Elliott, having found an actor was already named David Smith. He appeared in the film Police Academy 3: Back in Training in 1986, and subsequently in the television series Street Legal, Knots Landing as Bill Nolan, and in 1993's The Untouchables as Agent Paul Robbins. The following year, Elliott landed a recurring role on the hit series Melrose Place, playing Terry Parsons, and a guest appearance in an episode of Seinfeld as "Carl" the pro life furniture mover.

In 1995, Elliott landed the role he would hold for 10 years, as a naval aviator-turned JAG lawyer, Harmon Rabb, Jr., in the NBC/CBS television drama JAG. His tenure on JAG ended in 2005 with the series finale.

In 1996, Elliott starred in the made-for-cable movie Holiday Affair with Cynthia Gibb. This is a remake of the 1949 classic Holiday Affair, which starred Robert Mitchum and Janet Leigh. In 2005, Elliott starred in a Canadian television movie The Man Who Lost Himself, which was based on the true story of Terry Evanshen, a Canadian football player who was in a car accident and lost his memory due to severe head injuries. Nanci Chambers also appeared in this movie as a doctor. In October 2006, Elliott joined the cast of legal drama Close to Home (2005–2007) as Chief Deputy Prosecutor James Conlon. During 2008, he had a recurring role in the Canadian series The Guard. He starred in Sci Fi Channel's four-hour miniseries, Knights of Bloodsteel (2009). Elliott was cast as an Internet millionaire in Terror Trap, directed by Dan Garcia. Elliott also starred in Dad's Home (2010), as a widowed advertising executive who loses his job and becomes a stay-at-home dad for his two children.

On March 19, 2010, Elliott replaced Neal McDonough as the male lead in the television series Scoundrels. In 2010, Elliott was cast as FBI Agent Russ Josephson on CSI: NY, a recurring role as Detective Jo Danville's (Sela Ward) ex-husband, a role which he first portrayed in January 2011.

In 2012, Elliott also co-starred as Ripp Cockburn, the husband of Kristin Chenoweth's character Carlene, on ABC's comedy-drama series GCB. In 2014, Elliott appeared in Mad Men as Dave Wooster. In 2015, Elliott guest-starred in the TV drama Scorpion and played actor John Wayne in the film Trumbo.

Elliott reprised his JAG role of Harmon Rabb, Jr. for a multiple-episode arc in NCIS: Los Angeles season 10.

== Personal life ==
He married actress Nanci Chambers in 1992. She also appeared in JAG as the ambitious Lt. Loren Singer. They have a daughter, Stephanie Smith (b. 1993) and a son, Wyatt Smith (b. 2003).

== Filmography ==
=== Film ===
Year	Title	Role	Notes
1986	The Boy in Blue	Boat Man	Uncredited
1986	Police Academy 3: Back in Training	Cadet Baxter #2	
1986	The Climb	Otto Kempter	
1987	The Big Town	Cool Guy	
1988	Night Friend	Cab Driver	
1997	Clockwatchers	Mr. MacNamee	
2000	Stanley's Gig	Record Store Clerk	
2001	The Shrink Is In	Michael	
2008	The Rainbow Tribe	Morgan Roberts	
2009	Gooby	Jack Dandridge	
2010	Confined	Michael Peyton	
2010	Terror Trap	Don	
2012	Rufus	Hugh Wade	
2014	Dawn Patrol	Jim	
2015	Battle Scars	Frank Stephens	
2015	Trumbo	John Wayne	
2019	The Obituary of Tunde Johnson	Alfred O'Connor	
2021	Lansky	Frank Rivers	
2021	I Love Us	David Dallas	
2021	Heart of Champions	Mr. Singleton	
2022	Collide	P.I.	
2025	After All	Walter Sharpe	

=== Television ===
Year	Title	Role	Notes
1986	The Campbells	Hardy	Episode: "First Day"
1987	Adderly	Commando	Episode: "Year of the Tiger"
1987	Mariah	Fergus	Episode: "Prey"
1987	Captain Power and the Soldiers of the Future	Jason	Episode: "The Mirror in Darkness"
1988–1991	Street Legal	Nick Del Gado	Main role; 36 episodes
1989	Alfred Hitchcock Presents	Ted	Episode: "In the Driver's Seat"
1989	The Hitchhiker	Jason	Episode: "The Cruelest Cut"
1990	China Beach	Mr. Green	Episode: "Phoenix"
1991	Over My Dead Body	Larry Chadway	Episode: "Separation Is Murder"
1991	Her Wicked Ways	Andrew O'Brien	TV film
1991	Fly by Night	Mack Sheppard	Main role; 13 episodes
1991	The Hidden Room	Ron	Episode: "A Type of Love Story"
1992	Doogie Howser, M.D.	Rick O'Neill	Episode: "The Show Mustn't Go On"
1992	Dark Justice	Zachary Hamilton	Episode: "Needy Things"
1992	Knots Landing	Bill Nolan	3 episodes
1993–1994	The Untouchables	Agent Paul Robbins	Main role; 42 episodes
1994	Golden Gate	Tony Gennera	TV film
1994	Seinfeld	Carl	Episode: "The Couch"
1994–1995	Melrose Place	Terry Parsons	4 episodes
1995	Big Dreams and Broken Hearts: The Dottie West Story	Byron Metcalf	TV film
1995	Degree of Guilt	Chris Paget	TV film
1995–2005	JAG	Harmon "Harm" Rabb Jr.	Main role; 227 episodes
1996	Holiday Affair	Steve Mason	TV film
1998	Hercules	Thor	Episode: "Hercules and the Twilight of the Gods" (voice)
1999	Maggie Winters	Jack	Episode: "Girls Night Out"
2000	Buzz Lightyear of Star Command	Romac	Episode: "Star Crossed" (voice)
2001	Dodson's Journey	James Dodson	TV film
2003	Yes, Dear	Harmon "Harm" Rabb Jr.	Episode: "Let's Get Jaggy with It"
2003	Code 11-14	Det. Kurt Novack	TV film
2005	The Stranger I Married	Terry Evanshen	TV film
2006	Sixty Minute Man	John Henderson	TV film
2006	Medium	Johnny Dunham	Episode: "Twice Upon a Time"
2006–2007	Close to Home	James Conlon	Main role; 22 episodes
2008	Love Sick: Secrets of a Sex Addict	Rick Hudson	TV film
2008	The Guard	David Renwald	7 episodes
2009	Impact	Alex Kittner	TV miniseries
2009	Knights of Bloodsteel	John Serragoth	TV miniseries
2009	The Storm	General Wilson Braxton	TV miniseries
2010	Scoundrels	Wolfgang "Wolf" West	Main role; 8 episodes
2010	Dad's Home	Ben Westman	TV film
2011	Truth Be Told	Mark Crane	TV film
2011	CSI: NY	Agent Russ Josephson	2 episodes
2012	GCB	Ripp Cockburn	Main role; 10 episodes
2013	Exploding Sun	Don Wincroft	TV film
2014	Mad Men	Dave Wooster	2 episodes
2015	Scorpion	Bruce	Episode: "Forget Me Nots"
2017	Mom	Joe	Episode: "A Bouncy Castle and an Aneurysm"
2018–2019	Impulse	Bill Boone	Main role; 11 episodes
2018	Believe Me: The Abduction of Lisa McVey	Larry Pinkerton	TV film
2019	NCIS: Los Angeles	Harmon "Harm" Rabb Jr.	3 episodes
2019	The Kominsky Method	William	Episode: "Chapter 9. An Actor Forgets"
2020	Spinning Out	James Davis	Main role; 10 episodes
2021–2023	Heels	Tom Spade	9 episodes
2021	Zoey's Extraordinary Christmas Movie	Lumber Jack	TV film
2022	Call Me Kat	Dan Kingbird	Episode: "Call Me 'Cat's in the Cradle'"
2025	The Chicken Sisters	Clayton Briggs III	6 episodes
2025	Revival	Wayne Cypress	Main role; 10 episodes

== Awards ==
- TV Guide Award [2000] - "Favorite Male Actor in a Drama"
