= NCIS season 14 =

Season of American television series

NCIS
- Season 14
- Season 14 U.S. DVD cover
- Starring: Mark Harmon; Pauley Perrette; Sean Murray; Wilmer Valderrama; Jennifer Esposito; Emily Wickersham; Brian Dietzen; Duane Henry; Rocky Carroll; David McCallum
- No. of episodes: 24

Release
- Original network: CBS
- Original release: September 20, 2016 – May 16, 2017

Season chronology
- ← Previous; Season 13 Next → Season 15

The fourteenth season of NCIS an American police procedural drama originally aired on CBS from September 20, 2016, through May 16, 2017.

NCIS revolves around a fictional team of special agents from the Naval Criminal Investigative Service, which conducts criminal investigations involving the U.S. Navy and Marine Corps. This season brought three new characters: Wilmer Valderrama as NCIS Special Agent Nicholas "Nick" Torres, formerly working with an undercover unit, Agent Alexandra "Alex" Quinn (Jennifer Esposito), and Clayton Reeves (Duane Henry), an MI6 Senior Officer and liaison to NCIS.

== Cast and characters ==
=== Main ===
- Mark Harmon as Leroy Jethro Gibbs, NCIS Supervisory Special Agent (SSA) of the Major Case Response Team (MCRT) assigned to Washington's Navy Yard
- Pauley Perrette as Abby Sciuto, Forensic Specialist for NCIS
- Sean Murray as Timothy McGee, NCIS Senior Special Agent, Second in Command of MCRT
- Wilmer Valderrama as Nick Torres, NCIS Special Agent and former Undercover Agent
- Jennifer Esposito as Alexandra "Alex" Quinn, NCIS Special Agent and former FLETC Instructor
- Emily Wickersham as Eleanor "Ellie" Bishop, NCIS Special Agent
- Brian Dietzen as Dr. Jimmy Palmer, Assistant Medical Examiner for NCIS
- Rocky Carroll as Leon Vance, NCIS Director
- David McCallum as Dr. Donald "Ducky" Mallard, Chief Medical Examiner for NCIS
- Duane Henry as Clayton Reeves, MI6 Senior Officer and liaison to NCIS (main cast starting episode 5)

=== Recurring ===
- Patrick Labyorteaux as Bud Roberts, JAG Captain from Falls Church
- Joe Spano as Tobias Fornell, FBI Senior Special Agent
- Robert Wagner as Anthony DiNozzo, Sr., father of former NCIS Special Agent Anthony DiNozzo
- Margo Harshman as Delilah Fielding, DoD Intelligence Analyst and McGee's girlfriend/fiancée/wife
- Juliette Angelo as Emily Fornell, Tobias Fornell's daughter
- Tony Gonzalez as Tony Francis, NCIS Special Agent
- Adam Campbell as young Donald Mallard
- Laura San Giacomo as Dr. Grace Confalone, psychotherapist
- Mary Stuart Masterson as Jenna Flemming, Congresswoman
- French Stewart as Paul Triff, imprisoned serial killer
- Bruce Boxleitner as Vice Admiral C. Clifford Chase, deputy director for the Joint Chiefs of Staff
- Adam Croasdell as young Angus Clark, friend of young Donald Mallard
- John Finn as Gen. Charles T. Ellison, retired Commandant of the Marine Corps
- Richard Riehle as Maynard County Sheriff Walt Osorio and Sherlock Consortium member
- Jessica Walter as Judith McKnight, Sherlock Consortium member
- Todd Louiso as Lyle Waznicki, Sherlock Consortium member
- Sumalee Montano as Nicole Taggart, NCIS Special Agent
- Rafi Silver as Qasim Naasir, a translator who worked with NCIS, and boyfriend of NCIS Special Agent Eleanor Bishop

=== Guest appearances ===
- Caroline Lagerfelt as young Victoria Mallard, Ducky's deceased mother
- Scott Bakula as Dwayne Cassius Pride, NCIS Senior Special Agent and unit commander in New Orleans
- Lucas Black as Christopher Lasalle, NCIS Special Agent and second in command in New Orleans
- Bruce McGill as Henry Rogers, Vietnam War veteran
- Mercedes Ruehl as Marie Quinn, Alex Quinn's mother
- Elisabeth Rohm as Mounted Police Sergeant May Dawson

== Episodes ==
No. overall	No. in season	Title	Directed by	Written by	Original release date	Prod. code	U.S. viewers (millions)
307	1	"Rogue"	Tony Wharmby	Gary Glasberg & Jennifer Corbett	September 20, 2016	1401	16.00
After a car explodes, killing a Navy officer, the team discovers that the intended target was his wife—the sister to deep cover NCIS agent Nick Torres, who disappeared months earlier in Buenos Aires while investigating criminal businessman Leo Silva (a failed target in the past for Gibbs' mentor Mike Franks). Torres re-emerges after realizing his cover was blown by his sister coming to Argentina to search for him. Torres begs Gibbs to let him help close the case, as he knows that Silva wants him and his family dead. His only way of ensuring the safety of his sister and niece (and staying alive himself) is for Silva and his son to be safely removed from their power for a very long time. Meanwhile, Special Agent Quinn shadows the team to figure out the type of agent Gibbs is looking for. In the end, Torres and Quinn both join the team. Note: First appearance of Wilmer Valderrama as Nick Torres, and Jennifer Esposito as Alex Quinn. First in universe appearance of Patrick Labyorteaux as Navy Captain Bud Roberts since the JAG series finale in 2005.
308	2	"Being Bad"	James Whitmore Jr.	Steven D. Binder	September 27, 2016	1402	15.52
While investigating a death that took place at a reunion at Quantico, the team uncover a bomb plot which soon leads them to a long-running theft ring. Meanwhile, Torres and Quinn adjust to life as members of Gibbs' team which also includes new sitting arrangements.
309	3	"Privileged Information"	Edward Ornelas	George Schenck & Frank Cardea	October 4, 2016	1403	14.44
As the team investigate a Marine Sergeant who fell from a building, Doctor Grace Confalone confides in Gibbs that he should treat it as a murder investigation Meanwhile, Torres' struggles to adapt to life outside of undercover get more complex as he searches for a place to live.
310	4	"Love Boat"	Terrence O'Hara	Christopher J. Waild	October 11, 2016	1404	14.77
The body of a Navy lieutenant is discovered on board a destroyer during a tiger cruise, where civilian guests are given the option of spending the night on the ship. Gibbs, Quinn and Palmer head to sea to investigate the circumstances behind the death. Meanwhile, McGee thinks about the perfect proposal for Delilah.
311	5	"Philly"	Allan Arkush	Scott Williams	October 18, 2016	1405	14.76
MI6 Officer Clayton Reeves calls NCIS from Philadelphia when his search for a missing colleague ends with him finding a dead petty officer, so Gibbs sends Bishop and Quinn down to help. However, Quinn isn't willing to go as returning to Philadelphia means she must come to terms with the painful memory which resulted in her leaving field work.
312	6	"Shell Game"	Thomas J. Wright	Brendan Fehily	October 25, 2016	1406	14.08
A kidnapping victim manages to escape and kill her captor, but when her husband doesn't show, they learn he quit his job and vanished the same day his wife was abducted. Bishop and Abby discover the husband was the CEO of a company worth millions, except the company doesn't exist anywhere except on paper, so the team must discern fact from fiction to figure out the truth. Meanwhile, Abby has finished knitting her welcome presents for the newbies, and whilst Quinn immediately finds a use for hers, Torres' reluctance to wear his leads Gibbs to realise Nick is struggling to take his foot out of the door.
313	7	"Home of the Brave"	Alrick Riley	Gina Lucita Monreal	November 15, 2016	1407	14.73
Torres learns that a witness in a major NCIS case is being ruthlessly pursued by Immigration and Customs Enforcement, and he risks his career trying to right a wrong. Meanwhile, Tony DiNozzo Sr returns to town on a mission to sublet his son's apartment, which puts Abby, Bishop and McGee at odds when they try every underhanded tactic they can to get the apartment.
314	8	"Enemy Combatant"	Tony Wharmby	Jennifer Corbett	November 22, 2016	1409	14.86
A Navy chaplin is murdered and discovering he had been in contact with a prisoner at Gitmo, they learn that the man incarcerated may have been put there by a mountain of false paperwork and bad policing, which causes Bishop to question her own work at NSA when she begins to question how much collateral damage she may have caused. Meanwhile, NCIS is terrorised by Bishop's 3 older brothers who arrive for Thanksgiving.
315	9	"Pay to Play"	Arvin Brown	Cindi Hemingway	December 6, 2016	1408	14.64
Congresswoman Jenna Flemming is the victim of death threats with the latest being delivered whilst she's on a Navy Base, and Vance puts NCIS into high gear both protecting her and finding out who the sender is. They are helped by Clayton Reeves, who has transferred to NCIS as a liaison officer for MI6. While he and Torres start bumping egos, Quinns snooping of Reeves' desk lead her to wonder if he is involved in Operation Willoughby, an operation suspended because it was deemed a suicide mission.
316	10	"The Tie That Binds"	Arvin Brown	Steven D. Binder	December 13, 2016	1411	14.74
A dead Navy Captain who was under investigation for selling secrets is found with the address for Ducky's old home where he lived with his late mother Victoria. Investigation soon turns a link to is forced to a man known as Balthazar Kilmeany, who shares a name with Victoria's old boyfriend.
317	11	"Willoughby"	Tony Wharmby	Gina Lucita Monreal	January 3, 2017	1412	15.79
NCIS suspects that businessman Kai Chen has been organising terrorist attacks to influence the stock market, but to get the proof means putting yourself at immense risk, and so Operation Willoughby brought in MI6 Officer Clayton Reeves to go undercover. But when Reeves barely escapes a bomb with his life, NCIS must determine if their operation is compromised. However when they discover they overlooked a major development, one of the team is left shattered by personal loss.
318	12	"Off the Grid"	Rocky Carroll	George Schenck & Frank Cardea	January 17, 2017	1413	15.49
Red flags are raised when, for the first time ever, Gibbs doesn't appear at work. Investigating his usual diner, the team discovers that after a chance encounter Gibbs has resumed an undercover operation to catch someone on the NCIS Most Wanted list, who is responsible for the hijacking of a shipment of nuclear fuel rods which are still missing years later. Following Gibbs' breadcrumbs, the team discover that someone tipped off the suspect years ago, and must discover who it is before they can do it again.
319	13	"Keep Going"	Terrence O'Hara	Teleplay by : Scott Williams; Story by : Matthew R. Jarrett & Scott J. Jarrett	January 24, 2017	1410	16.21
A hit-and-run driver kills Navy Captain Paul Smith. NCIS questions witness Renee Prewdome. Palmer climbs onto a ledge to save Paul's son Ryan from jumping, insisting, "I'm no hero," recalling Ducky's advice (in "About Face"), urging, "please stay alive." Quinn warns away Fireman Lt. Earl Davis. Skidmarks absent, Bishop establishes intent. NCIS scrambles to assuage Ryan's guilt-riddeness. Lieutenant Cmr. Cheryl Stanley implicates Cdr. Ted Morgan. Ryan regrets his failures. Having nearly failed ("A Weak Link"), Jimmy encourages, "so-called" successful people have "lousy days." Carol Wilson and Abby heartened, "just have faith" ("Homesick"). Without such friends, Ryan tries jumping. Jimmy slips; Ryan saves him. McGee and Torres position a microphone, overhearing about Gibbs' support when Jimmy lost his child ("Rock and a Hard Place"). Hearing about their near-collision, NCIS reviews trafficams. Jimmy remembers determining to finish school ("Phoenix"), eventually passing the M.E. test, which NCIS only now learns; "I 'opt for happiness'." Abby identifies handyman Edgar Stump as the road-rage killer. Jimmy remembers, "I don't want to cut open another friend" (Diane Sterling in "Check"). "I also see their families, Ryan." Gibbs tells Ryan, "Not your fault....we need you to testify." Jimmy echoes Ducky – "When you're going through hell, keep going."
320	14	"Nonstop"	Mark Horowitz	Brendan Fehily	February 7, 2017	1414	15.57
Delivering pizza, Zeke discovers PO2 Maya Kettering dead. Maynard County Sheriff Walt Osorio, from the Sherlock Consortium for Investigation (in "16 Years"), insists upon joint-investigation, having deputized SCI inductee Palmer, and new "probie" DiNozzo Sr., who woos SCI/Author Judith McKnight. Maya's husband, graphic designer Michael Kettering, who alibis on airport video, implicates Maya's department head, Dombrows. Hearing alarms, McGee and Torres corner Voltrane security technician Taj Robinson. Gibbs questions Cmr. James Shelty and Lt. Cheryl Dombrows. Abby analyzes carpet fibers – Maya's body was purposefully moved to be found. SCI member Lyle, Osorio, and Abby discover Michael's second residence. Quinn sifts unsolved burglaries. NCIS stakes-out Michael, finding new fiancée Darlene Jones, who alibis. NCIS reviews airport video. Noticing other Voltrane homes burgled, they revisit Taj, "fixing" the alarm. Tipped, Lyle is tazed trying to taze Taj. Bishop halts Taj, who alibis, robbing another home in Delaware. Gibbs, "Still one suspect left." He suggests a pregnancy, but as a Catholic, Maya denied him a divorce. DiNozzo calls Gibbs about smuggling Cuban cigars using airport lavatories to switch labels, sans security cameras. NCIS arrest Michael, who switched clothes and flights to establish his alibi. Osorio anoints DiNozzo a full-fledge SCI member.
321	15	"Pandora's Box (Part I)"	Alrick Riley	Christopher J. Waild	February 14, 2017	1416	15.29
At an All Good Things concert, Metro Police arrest "Evil Abby" who placed balloons into bomb-rigged HVAC ducts. Two Days Earlier: Homeland Investigations think-tank head Earl Goddard explained his simulation; "sarin gas attack on the VIP suites" to identify weaknesses. Vance ordered Abby, "Go be a bad guy." Presently: Gibbs vouches for Abby. The Bomb Squad contains "live ordinance." McGee confirms liquid saran-filled balloons. Finding Goddard dead by sarin, Homeland Operations director Knox Elliott surmises, somebody piggybacked their operation. NCIS questions Goddard's team; CDC researcher Greta Fensternacht, film director John James Axiom, and DHS logistics manager Phil Kurjak. Ducky determines, Goddard was murdered. Bishop discovers more sarin was stolen than used. Reeves reports, Elliott wiped data after being hacked. LaSalle adds, the hack originated in the French Quarter, stealing Homeland's "terror playbook" – dozens of simulated, successful attacks, detailing "how Homeland would respond...offence and defense." Abby and Quinn identify the targeted VIP; Bosnia and Herzegovina foreign affairs minister Jovan Dezic. They arrest Kurjak, whose parents died during the Bosnian-Serb army's 1990s genocide. "Good Abby" prevents Kurjak's next attack, saving Dezic's teen son. Requesting undercover assignment, Torres tells Pride, Ferdinand Pisco wants the playbook. Gibbs sends McGee with Torres to New Orleans. Note: This episode begins a crossover event that concludes on NCIS: New Orleans season 3 episode 14.
322	16	"A Many Splendored Thing"	Michael Zinberg	David J. North & Steven D. Binder	February 21, 2017	1415	14.87
For disobedience and canceling DLA computer purchases, a voice on Navy Lt. Cmdr. Renée Turner's television orders, "Kill yourself...or we kill your daughter." Reeves discovers song lyric messages from Kai Chen. His courier Dabney says, Chen plans to attack the electrical grid. Bishop recalls her boyfriend Qasim Naasir, who Chen assassinated (in "Willoughby"). Ducky describes Turner's oxytocin "cuddle hormone" response as "an act of love." Abby traces Turner's order; radio tower owner Kevin Lane says, his silent partner "Bobby" (aka Chen) arrives soon. NCIS-SA Donna Andrews positions REACT airport teams, but having already arrived, Chen visits Gibbs, claiming the CIA, SecDef, and the new Counter-Terrorism House Subcommittee head, Congresswoman Jenna Flemming, made him an offer to find and capture Syrian warlord Asu Harari, who finances ISIS. Angered, Bishop remembers Qasim saying, "You can't reduce love to a binary code." Abby converts Chen's lyric-codes, discovering an executable virus, which McGee learns exploits diesel generators. Bishop captures Chen, phones the Syrians he sold-out, and forces Chen to make his own Sophie's Choice, resulting in his death. Gibbs warns of a price for "going rogue." Bishop retorts, she had planned to accept Qasim's marriage proposal.
323	17	"What Lies Above"	Leslie Libman	Scott Williams	March 7, 2017	1417	14.17
After killing Louis Cole burgling his condominium, McGee asks his teammates not to reveal to his wife, Delilah, the triple-homicide fifteen years ago, before they moved in, which explains how Tony DiNozzo acquired the property so cheaply. Bishop reviews the case of convicted killer Paul Triff, whose furrier business was a front for a smuggling ring; he had dismembered his associates inside the condo. From crowbar prints, they identify the second robber, Walter Shibberd, recovering Delilah's private HDD, learning Cole was tipped in prison by Triff's associates. Beneath the floorboards under McGee's bed, Abby's scans find the mummified corpse of crooked lobbyist Logan Pruitt, a suspect in the Pretoria diamond heist; autopsy reveals he swallowed a safe-deposit key. Purple-dyed hair on Cole's shirt clues NCIS back to Margo Lenkovic, who reveals a bank in Selbyville, Delaware, where they find the diamonds. Meanwhile, Congresswoman Jenna Flemming introduces Congressman Stephen Shaw, hoping to jumpstart Vance's political career. But Triff had bargained, in vain, for the diamonds' location in return for "considerations." Ethical differences over a "deal with the devil" results in Flemming stepping back from her romantic relationship with Vance.
324	18	"M.I.A."	Thomas J. Wright	Jennifer Corbett	March 14, 2017	1418	14.16
325	19	"The Wall"	Bethany Rooney	Gina Lucita Monreal	March 28, 2017	1419	14.35
When a Marine is murdered at an event being held at the Honor Flight Network – a non-profit organization that arranges veterans to visit the World War II, Korea and Vietnam War Memorials for free – the NCIS team investigate while relying on an irritable Vietnam War veteran, Henry Rogers, to provide details on the victim's whereabouts throughout the day while McGee and Bishop investigate a juicy rumor about Quinn and Torres.
326	20	"A Bowl of Cherries"	Edward Ornelas	Brendan Fehily	April 4, 2017	1420	13.83
When a vice admiral's laptop is infected with ransomware, he enlists McGee and the NCIS team to track down the hacker before the computer virus eliminates his personal and professional files forever while Quinn takes time off to assist her mother, Marie after she receives a "911" text.
327	21	"One Book, Two Covers"	Terrence O'Hara	David J. North	April 18, 2017	1421	13.32
The team relies on Torres' case notes and knowledge of a biker gang with which he once spent a year undercover when an officer's murder is linked to former members.
328	22	"Beastmaster"	Bethany Rooney	Christopher J. Waild	May 2, 2017	1422	12.88
The murder of a Marine in Rock Creek Park leads the team to work with Mounted Park Police officer May Dawson on the case and soon discover a link to the sale of African bushmeat. Meanwhile, the team has to go through pepper spray certification.
329	23	"Something Blue"	James Whitmore Jr.	Jennifer Corbett & Scott Williams	May 9, 2017	1423	13.39
NCIS investigate when a young and healthy Petty Officer aboard a Navy destroyer dies in his sleep while the stress of McGee and Delilah's imminent wedding takes its toll as Delilah is rushed to the hospital after collapsing.
330	24	"Rendezvous"	Tony Wharmby	George Schenck & Frank Cardea & Steven D. Binder	May 16, 2017	1424	13.33
Part 1 of 2: In lawless Paraguan jungles, testing mine runoff for sulfur, acid, and radon particulates, married chemists Doug and Julie find Navy SEAL, PO1 Matthew Dean's severed hand. Asunción NCIS-SA Nicole Taggart says Dean travelled against orders. His wife Elizabeth believes him in Canada. In Mosul, Commander Peter Josephson says fmr. PO Charlie Hudson went fishing. Hudson's motorhome indicates a four-man squad. PO Christopher Clayton says, "going fishing" was code for Vegas, intimating gambling problems. Their last mission was against the Revolutionary Armed Council. McGee adds, they kidnap-train child soldiers to steal uranium. Bishop finds, "R.A.C. had 'barrels of cash'," providing motive. Fending off Curtis Hubley's advances, Abby reconnoiters via NOAA, finding Dean alive; NCIS presumes other body parts are Hudson's. They travel to Val Verde to find Dean. Gibbs questions an elderly man. Gabriella tells Torres, RAC took her brother Ramón. Bishop and Reeves question Donald Burke of United Hope & Relief about their weapons shipment. Through Sister Lucita, Dean says he tried rescuing Ricardo's son from the RAC. They rescue Enrique with other boys, but Gibbs remains, covering their helicopter exfiltration. McGee joins Gibbs on the ground to hold off RAC rebels. To be continued... (in "House Divided" season 15, episode 1). Note: Last appearance of Jennifer Esposito as Alex Quinn

== Production ==
=== Development ===
NCIS was renewed for seasons fourteen and fifteen on February 29, 2016. During production of this season, NCIS showrunner Gary Glasberg died on September 28, 2016. In November 2016, it was reported that executive producers George Schenck and Frank Cardea, would succeed Glasberg as co-showrunners for season fourteen.

=== Casting ===
On April 4, 2016, Duane Henry, appeared as MI6 Officer Clayton Reeves in the final two episodes of thirteen season. Henry was promoted to series regular for season fourteen. Wilmer Valderrama joined the cast as Nicholas Torres on June 16, 2016, along with Jennifer Esposito as Alex Quinn on July 11, 2016. On June 9, 2017 (after the airing of the fourteenth-season finale), Deadline Hollywood and TV Guide reported that Jennifer Esposito would not return for season fifteen.

== Reception ==
=== Ratings ===
Viewership and ratings per episode of NCIS season 14
No.	Title	Air date	Rating/share (18–49)	Viewers (millions)	DVR (18–49)	DVR viewers (millions)	Total (18–49)	Total viewers (millions)
1	"Rogue"	September 20, 2016	2.2/8	15.99	0.9	4.24	3.1	20.23
2	"Being Bad"	September 27, 2016	2.1/8	15.52	0.9	3.98	3.0	19.50
3	"Privileged Information"	October 4, 2016	1.9/7	14.44	0.8	3.95	2.7	18.39
4	"Love Boat"	October 11, 2016	1.8/7	14.77	0.8	3.78	2.6	18.55
5	"Philly"	October 18, 2016	1.8/7	14.76	0.8	3.95	2.6	18.72
6	"Shell Game"	October 25, 2016	1.7/6	14.08	0.8	3.67	2.5	17.75
7	"Home of the Brave"	November 15, 2016	1.7/6	14.73	0.8	3.49	2.5	18.22
8	"Enemy Combatant"	November 22, 2016	1.9/6	14.86	0.8	3.91	2.7	18.77
9	"Pay to Play"	December 6, 2016	1.8/7	14.64	0.8	3.85	2.6	18.49
10	"The Tie That Binds"	December 13, 2016	1.7/6	14.74	0.8	3.80	2.5	18.54
11	"Willoughby"	January 3, 2017	1.8/6	15.79	0.7	3.60	2.5	19.45
12	"Off the Grid"	January 17, 2017	1.9/7	15.49	0.7	3.32	2.6	18.82
13	"Keep Going"	January 24, 2017	1.9/7	16.21	0.7	3.51	2.6	19.72
14	"Nonstop"	February 7, 2017	1.7/6	15.57	0.7	3.70	2.4	19.27
15	"Pandora's Box (Part I)"	February 14, 2017	1.8/7	15.29	0.7	3.83	2.5	19.12
16	"A Many Splendored Thing"	February 21, 2017	1.6/6	14.87	0.7	3.46	2.3	18.33
17	"What Lies Above"	March 7, 2017	1.6/6	14.17	0.7	3.68	2.3	17.85
18	"M.I.A."	March 14, 2017	1.5/6	14.16	0.8	3.56	2.3	17.72
19	"The Wall"	March 28, 2017	1.6/6	14.35	0.7	3.31	2.3	17.66
20	"A Bowl of Cherries"	April 4, 2017	1.6/6	13.83	0.6	3.48	2.2	17.31
21	"One Book, Two Covers"	April 18, 2017	1.3/5	13.32	0.8	3.74	2.1	17.06
22	"Beastmaster"	May 2, 2017	1.5/6	12.88	0.7	3.74	2.2	16.62
23	"Something Blue"	May 9, 2017	1.4/6	13.39	0.8	3.68	2.2	17.07
24	"Rendezvous"	May 16, 2017	1.5/7	13.33	0.7	3.72	2.2	17.05
