= NCIS (TV series) =

American television series (since 2003)

- Genre: Military; Action; Police procedural
- Created by: Donald P. Bellisario; Don McGill
- Starring: Mark Harmon; Sasha Alexander; Michael Weatherly; Pauley Perrette; David McCallum; Sean Murray; Cote de Pablo; Lauren Holly; Rocky Carroll; Brian Dietzen; Emily Wickersham; Wilmer Valderrama; Jennifer Esposito; Duane Henry; Maria Bello; Diona Reasonover; Katrina Law; Gary Cole
- Theme music composer: Numeriklab
- Composers: Brian Kirk; Steven Bramson; Joseph Conlan
- Country of origin: United States
- Original language: English
- No. of seasons: 24
- No. of episodes: 513 (list of episodes)

Production
- Executive producers: Donald P. Bellisario; Steven D. Binder; Shane Brennan (2007–2015); Frank Cardea; Gary Glasberg (2009–2016); Chas. Floyd Johnson; George Schenck (2011–2018); Mark Harmon; Mark Horowitz
- Producers: David Bellisario; Avery C. Drewe
- Production location: Santa Clarita, California
- Cinematography: Billy Webb
- Running time: 39–44 minutes
- Production companies: Belisarius Productions; CBS Studios (Note: Credited as Paramount Network Television from 2003–2006, CBS Paramount Network Television from 2006–2009 and as CBS Television Studios from 2009–2020.)

Original release
- Network: CBS
- Release: September 23, 2003 – present

Related
- JAG; NCIS: Los Angeles; NCIS: New Orleans; NCIS: Hawaiʻi; NCIS: Sydney; NCIS: Origins; NCIS: Tony & Ziva; NCIS: New York

NCIS is an American military police procedural television series and the first installment within the NCIS media franchise. With production helmed by showrunner, Steven D. Binder, the series portrays a fictional team of special agents from the Naval Criminal Investigative Service (NCIS). The concept and characters were initially introduced with two episodes of the CBS series JAG (season eight episodes 20 and 21: "Ice Queen" and "Meltdown", which aired on April 22 and 29, 2003 respectively); as a spin-off from JAG, the series premiered on September 23, 2003, on CBS. Donald P. Bellisario and Don McGill are co-creators and executive producers of the premiere member of the NCIS franchise. As of 2025, NCIS was the third-longest-running scripted, live-action American prime-time TV series, surpassed only by Law & Order: Special Victims Unit (since 1999) and Law & Order (1990–2010; since 2022); it is the fifth-longest-running scripted American prime-time TV series overall.

As of 2026, with the cancellation of The Late Show with Stephen Colbert and the endings of Blue Bloods and S.W.A.T., NCIS is the last scripted show in production under Les Moonves.

The series originally had the redundant title Navy NCIS; this was later changed to in season 2 Naval Criminal Investigative Service and then in season 3 to NCIS. In season six, a two-part episode led to a spin-off series, NCIS: Los Angeles. Another two-part episode, during the 11th season, led to a second spin-off series, NCIS: New Orleans.

Though reception was initially tepid, with ratings barely cracking the top 30 during the first two seasons, the third season showed progress and consistently ranked in the top 20. In 2011, NCIS was voted "America's favorite television show" in an online Harris Poll. At the end of its 10th season, it was the most-watched television series in the U.S. during the 2012–13 network television season. NCIS also surpassed Gunsmoke's record for longest-running scripted primetime television series to air on CBS.

On January 5, 2024, it was announced that the prequel, NCIS: Origins, would be aired during the 2024–25 season, as another spin-off series; another spin-off, NCIS: Tony & Ziva, was announced on February 28, 2024, as a series exclusive to Paramount+. On April 9, 2024, NCIS was renewed for a 22nd season, which premiered on October 14, 2024. In February 2025, it was renewed for season 23, which premiered on Tuesday, October 14, 2025. In January 2026, it was renewed for season 24, which premiered on October 6, 2026.

== Premise ==
NCIS details the experiences and stories of a team of special agents working for the NCIS. The team, called the Major Case Response Team (MCRT) primarily responds to high-visibility crimes; NCIS is the main federal law enforcement agency of the United States Department of the Navy, investigating criminal activities (e.g. deaths, force protection, treason, etc.) related to the United States Navy and Marine Corps (USMC), and their associated branches of government.

In the series, the NCIS is based at the Washington Navy Yard in Washington, D.C., where it was previously led by Supervisory Special Agent Leroy Jethro Gibbs, a former USMC Gunnery Sergeant/Scout Sniper and a skilled investigator, until his suspension late in season 18. Supervisory Special Agent Alden Parker (a former FBI special agent) now leads the team, following his appointment early in season 19.

== Cast and characters ==
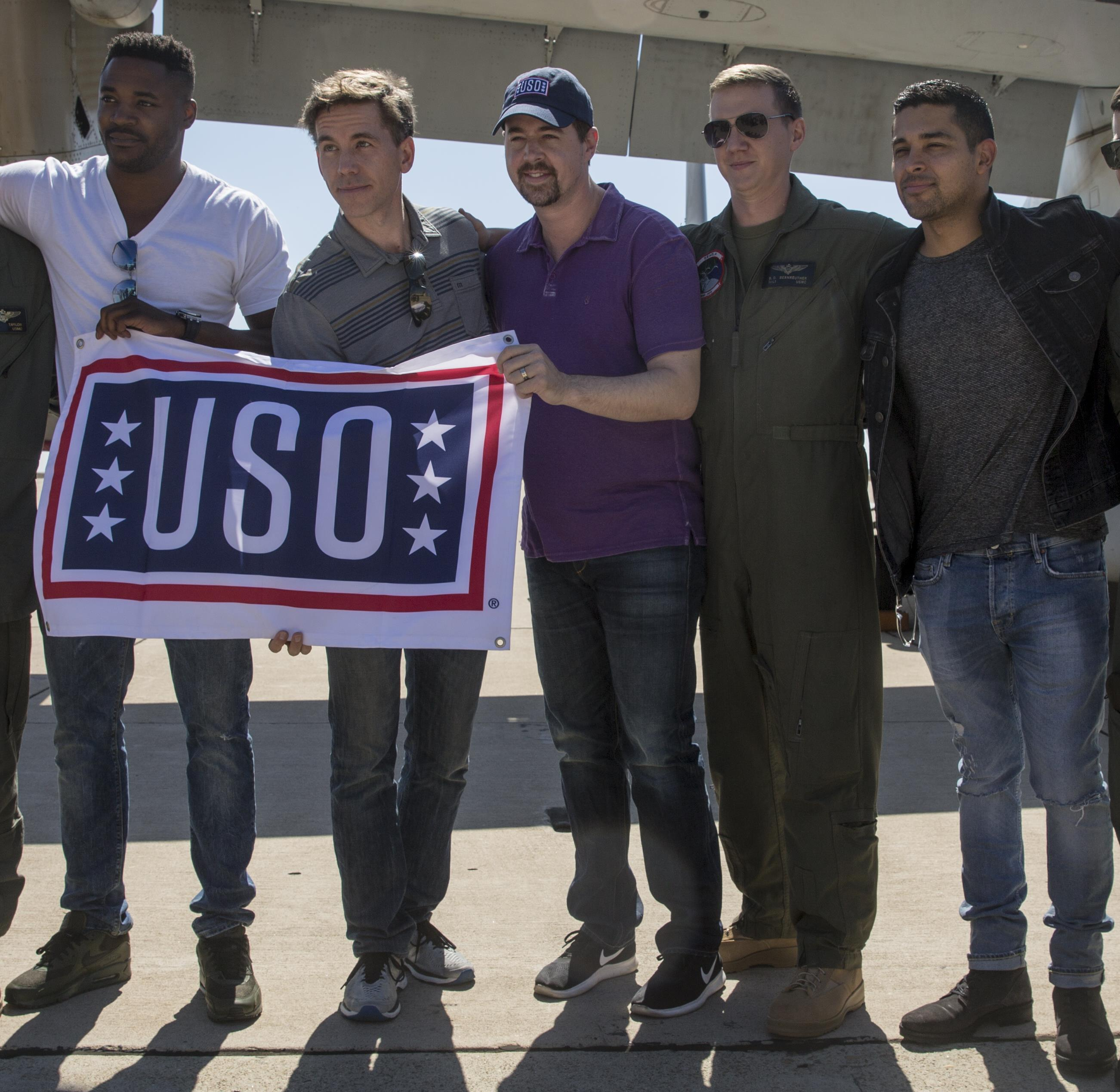
From left: Duane Henry, Brian Dietzen, Sean Murray (in purple), Wilmer Valderrama (at right), pictured with active duty airman, in uniform.

- Mark Harmon as NCIS Supervisory Special Agent and Special Agent in Charge Leroy Jethro Gibbs (seasons 1–19)
- Sasha Alexander as NCIS Special Agent Caitlin Todd (main role: seasons 1–2; guest: season 3)
- Michael Weatherly as NCIS Director Anthony DiNozzo (main: seasons 1–13, 24–present; guest: season 21)
- Pauley Perrette as NCIS Forensic Specialist Abby Sciuto (seasons 1–15)
- David McCallum as Dr. Donald "Ducky" Mallard (seasons 1–20; credit only: season 21)
- Sean Murray as NCIS Senior Field Agent Timothy McGee (recurring role: season 1, main: season 2–present)
- Cote de Pablo as NCIS Special Agent Ziva David (main: seasons 3–11; guest: seasons 3 & 16; recurring: season 17)
- Lauren Holly as NCIS Director Jenny Shepard (recurring: season 3; main: seasons 3–5)
- Rocky Carroll as NCIS Director Leon Vance (recurring: season 5; main: seasons 6–23)
- Brian Dietzen as Dr. Jimmy Palmer (recurring: seasons 1–5, also starring: seasons 6–9, main: season 10–present)
- Emily Wickersham as NCIS Special Agent Eleanor Bishop (guest: seasons 11 & 23; main: seasons 11–18)
- Wilmer Valderrama as NCIS Special Agent Nicholas Torres (season 14–present)
- Jennifer Esposito as NCIS Special Agent Alexandra Quinn (season 14)
- Duane Henry as NCIS International Desk Agent Clayton Reeves (guest: season 13; main: seasons 14–15)
- Maria Bello as NCIS Special Agent and Psychologist Dr. Jacqueline Sloane (seasons 15–18)
- Diona Reasonover as NCIS Forensic Specialist Kasie Hines (recurring: season 15; main: season 16–present)
- Katrina Law as NCIS Special Agent Jessica Knight (guest: season 18; main: season 19–present)
- Gary Cole as NCIS Supervisory Special Agent Alden Parker (guest: season 19; main: season 19–present)

== Episodes ==
As of November 17, 2026, 513 episodes of NCIS have aired, currently in its twenty-fourth season.

Season	Episodes	Originally released		Rank	Rating
Season	Episodes	First released	Last released	Rank	Rating
Intro	2	April 22, 2003	April 29, 2003	—N/a	—N/a
1	23	September 23, 2003	May 25, 2004	23	7.8
2	23	September 28, 2004	May 24, 2005	22	8.8
3	24	September 20, 2005	May 16, 2006	12	9.8
4	24	September 19, 2006	May 22, 2007	15	9.0
5	19	September 25, 2007	May 20, 2008	11	9.2
6	25	September 23, 2008	May 19, 2009	5	10.9
7	24	September 22, 2009	May 25, 2010	4	11.5
8	24	September 21, 2010	May 17, 2011	5	11.8
9	24	September 20, 2011	May 15, 2012	2	12.3
10	24	September 25, 2012	May 14, 2013	1	13.5
11	24	September 24, 2013	May 13, 2014	1	12.6
12	24	September 23, 2014	May 12, 2015	2	11.6
13	24	September 22, 2015	May 17, 2016	1	12.8
14	24	September 20, 2016	May 16, 2017	2	11.4
15	24	September 26, 2017	May 22, 2018	2	10.3
16	24	September 25, 2018	May 21, 2019	3	9.6
17	20	September 24, 2019	April 14, 2020	3	10.1
18	16	November 17, 2020	May 25, 2021	4	10.3
19	21	September 20, 2021	May 23, 2022	4	11.9
20	22	September 19, 2022	May 22, 2023	3	12.7
21	10	February 12, 2024	May 6, 2024	4	9.66
22	20	October 14, 2024	May 5, 2025	11	10.59
23	20	October 14, 2025	May 12, 2026	9	10.00
24	TBA	October 6, 2026	TBA	TBA	TBA

=== Backdoor pilots ===
==== JAG ====
Two episodes of JAG season eight, "Ice Queen" and "Meltdown", serve as the backdoor pilot of NCIS itself.

These JAG episodes introduced the characters of Jethro Gibbs, Anthony DiNozzo, Vivian Blackadder, Abby Sciuto, and Donald "Ducky" Mallard.

Patrick Labyorteaux appears on NCIS reprising his JAG role as Lt. Bud Roberts in the first-season episode "Hung Out to Dry", in the 14th-season episode "Rogue", and in the season-15 episode "Dark Secrets"; Alicia Coppola returned as Lt. Cmdr. Faith Coleman in "UnSEALed", "Call of Silence", and "Hometown Hero", while Adam Baldwin returned as Cmdr. Michael Rainer in "A Weak Link", and John M. Jackson appeared as retired Rear Admiral A. J. Chegwidden in the season-10 episode "Damned If You Do".

==== NCIS: Los Angeles ====
The two-part NCIS season-six episode "Legend" serves as the backdoor pilot of NCIS: Los Angeles.

"Legend" introduces Chris O'Donnell as G. Callen, LL Cool J as Sam Hanna, Daniela Ruah as Kensi Blye, and Barrett Foa as Eric Beale.

Rocky Carroll recurs on NCIS: Los Angeles as his NCIS character Director Leon Vance, while Pauley Perrette has appeared twice as Abby, and Michael Weatherly has appeared once as Anthony DiNozzo. NCIS guest stars reprising roles between series include David Dayan Fisher as CIA Officer Trent Kort, in the season finale of NCIS: Los Angeles, and Kelly Hu as Lee Wuan Kai in NCIS: Los Angeles and later in an episode of NCIS.

John M. Jackson has appeared on NCIS: Los Angeles as his JAG character Admiral A. J. Chegwidden, while this series has also crossed over with Hawaii Five-0 and Scorpion.

==== NCIS: New Orleans ====
The two-part NCIS season-11 episode "Crescent City" serves as the backdoor pilot of NCIS: New Orleans.

"Crescent City" introduces Scott Bakula as Dwayne Pride, Lucas Black as Christopher LaSalle, Zoe McLellan as Meredith Brody, and CCH Pounder as Loretta Wade.

Rocky Carroll recurs as Director Leon Vance, while NCIS series regulars Mark Harmon, Michael Weatherly, Pauley Perrette, Sean Murray, Emily Wickersham, Wilmer Valderrama, David McCallum, and Brian Dietzen have all appeared as their NCIS characters. NCIS recurring cast members Meredith Eaton, Joe Spano, Diane Neal, and Leslie Hope have all guest-starred on NCIS: New Orleans.

== Production ==
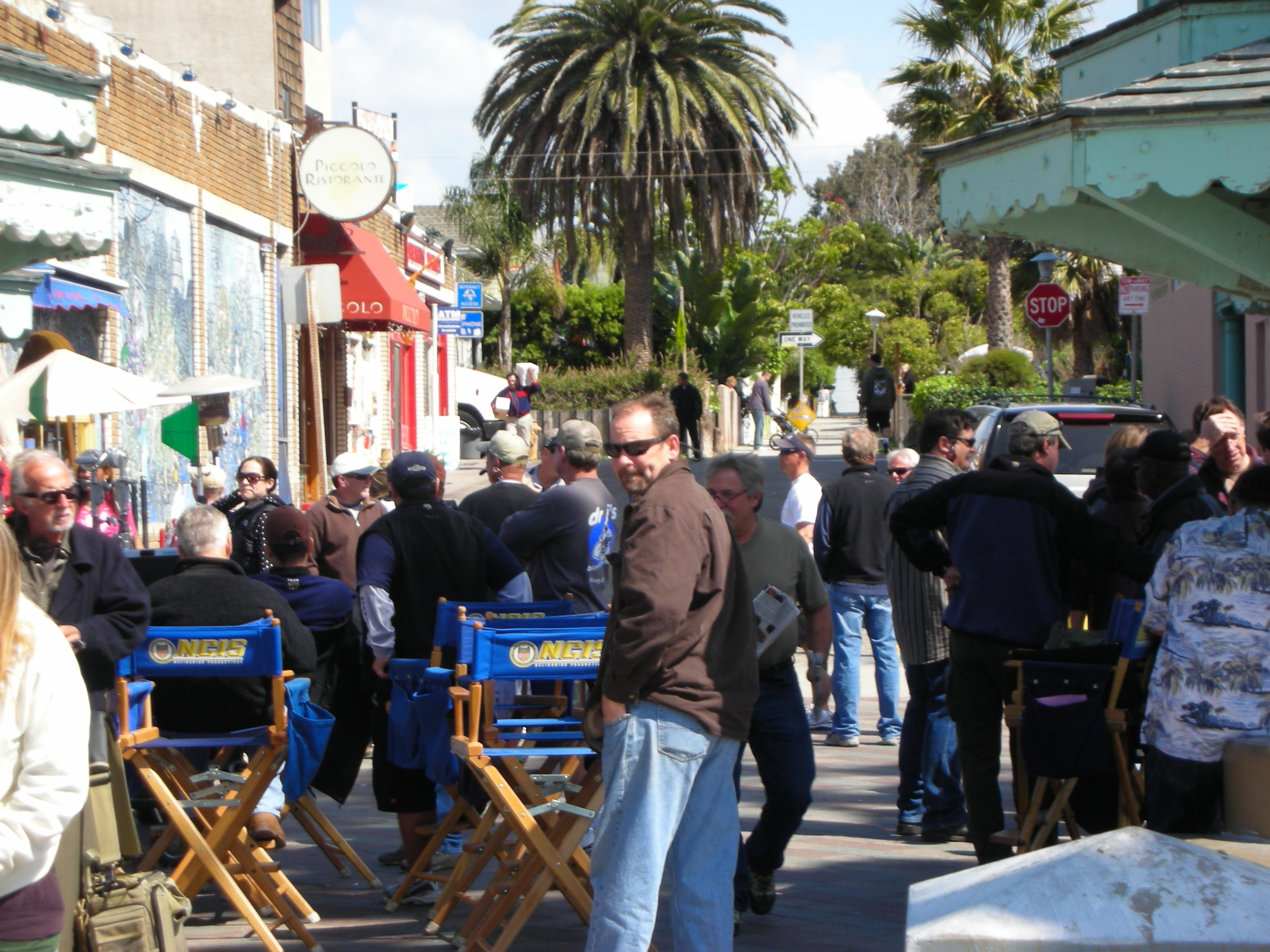
Filming in 2009

=== Title ===
Before the launch of the first season, advertisements on CBS identified the show as "Naval CIS". By the time of the launch of the first episode, NCIS was airing under the name Navy NCIS, the name it held for the entire first season. Since the "N" in NCIS stands for "Naval", the name "Navy NCIS" was redundant. The decision to use this name was reportedly made by CBS, over the objections of Bellisario, who preferred the old title because he felt it would:

- Attract new viewers (particularly those of JAG), who might not know the NCIS abbreviation
- Distinguish between NCIS and the similarly themed and similarly spelled CBS series CSI and its spinoffs. (The original title, for instance, was often misquoted and parodied as "Navy CSI", something the show itself referenced in the first episode).

=== Development ===
In 2011, NCIS was voted America's favorite television show in an online Harris poll. NCIS finished its 10th season as the most-watched television series in the U.S. during the 2012–13 network television season. Diona Reasonover joined the main cast in season 16, following the departures of Duane Henry and Pauley Perrette. NCIS was renewed for a seventeenth season on April 11, 2019, which premiered on September 24, 2019, and for an eighteenth season in May 2020. The season premiered on November 17, 2020.

On January 8, 2025, it was announced that NCIS would suspend production due to the wildfires in the Southern California region, where the show is filmed. Production was resumed January 13.

=== Flair ===
From the season two episode "Lt. Jane Doe" onwards, the series began showing two-second-long black-and-white clips. These clips (called "phoofs") are shown at the beginning of every segment depicting the last two seconds of that segment, a segment being the five or six portions of the show meant to be separated by commercials. Additionally, starting with the season three premiere, "Kill Ari (Part I)," a freeze-frame shot was also used at the very end of most episodes as well.

=== Crew changes ===
It was reported in May 2007 that Donald P. Bellisario would be stepping down from the show. Due to a disagreement with series star Mark Harmon, Bellisario's duties as showrunner/head writer were to be given to long-time show collaborators, including co-executive producer Chas. Floyd Johnson and Shane Brennan, with Bellisario retaining his title as executive producer. In fall 2009, Gary Glasberg joined the crew and became the new "day-to-day" runner of NCIS because Shane Brennan had to focus on his new show, the spin-off NCIS: Los Angeles. On September 28, 2016, Glasberg died in his sleep at the age of 50.

== Release ==
=== Broadcast ===
NCIS airs on Network 10, 10 Bold, Fox Crime (formerly TV Hits and TV1) and Paramount+ in Australia, Global (syndicated on sister channels Showcase and Lifetime) in Canada, TV3 and The Box in New Zealand, Seriale+ (premieres), TVN (free-TV premieres), TVN7 (reruns), AXN (reruns), (India) Fox Crime, Star World India (Pakistan) ARY Digital, ARY Zindagi, TVOne Pakistan and TV Puls (reruns) in Poland, Disney+ Hotstar and Rock Entertainment in Southeast Asia, CBS Justice, Channel 5 and 5USA in the United Kingdom, M6 in France, RTÉ2 in Ireland, Rai 2 in Italy, and USA Network, Ion Television, Sundance TV, We TV, Lifetime, and Heroes & Icons in the United States. It also airs on Disney+ in the United Kingdom. NCIS aired in Russia on FOX.

=== Home media ===
The first 20 seasons of NCIS have been released in Regions 1, 2, and 4. In Germany (Region 2), seasons 1–4 and 5–8 were released in two separate sets for each season. The first-season DVD omits the two introductory episodes from season eight of JAG, though they are featured on the JAG season eight DVD.

=== Other releases ===
In 2010, CBS Interactive and GameHouse released a mobile video game, NCIS: The Game for iOS, Android, BlackBerry, Windows Mobile, and BREW/J2ME. The game features five different cases written by the show's writers.

On November 1, 2011, Ubisoft released a video game adaptation of NCIS for the PC, Xbox 360, PlayStation 3, and Wii. A Nintendo 3DS version followed on March 6, 2012. The video game was deemed a mockery of the show by reviewers and players alike, and received a 2/10 rating on GameSpot.

There is also a Facebook and mobile game called NCIS: Hidden Crimes.

=== TV movies ===
In the UK, certain NCIS multi-part episodes were edited together to make a combined feature and shown on Channel 5, 5USA, CBS Action and Fox UK. These include:

Title	Episodes edited together	Air date	Runtime	Source
The NCIS Movie: Enemies	"Enemies Foreign" / "Enemies Domestic"	May 20, 2013	1 hr, 20 mins	
The NCIS Movie: Judgement Day	"Judgment Day (Part I)" / "Judgment Day (Part II)"	June 10, 2013	1 hr, 40 mins	
The NCIS Movie: Legend (Legend Compilation)	"Legend (Part I)" / "Legend (Part II)"	June 10, 2013	1 hr, 45 mins	
The NCIS Movie: Kill Ari	"Kill Ari (Part I)" / "Kill Ari (Part II)"	August 22, 2013	2 hrs	
The NCIS Movie: War on Terror	"Engaged (Part I)" / "Engaged (Part II)"	February 1, 2014	1 hr, 20 mins	
The NCIS Movie: Payback	"Borderland" / "Patriot Down" / "Rule Fifty-One"	March 1, 2014	2 hrs, 35 mins	
The NCIS Movie: Shell Shock	"Shell Shock (Part I)" / "Shell Shock (Part II)"	April 11, 2014	1 hr, 30 mins	
Death Wish (Part I & II)	"Shabbat Shalom" / "Shiva"	April 16, 2014 (1); April 18, 2014 (2)	1 hr, 40 mins	
The NCIS Movie: Race Against Terror: Hiatus	"Hiatus (Part I)" / "Hiatus (Part II)"	August 20, 2016; September 17, 2016	1 hr, 50 mins	

=== Soundtrack ===
CBS Records released the show's first soundtrack on February 10, 2009. The Official TV Soundtrack is a two-disc, 22-track set that includes brand new songs from top artists featured prominently in upcoming episodes of the series, as well as the show's original theme by Numeriklab (available commercially for the first time) and a remix of the theme by Ministry. The set also includes songs performed by series regulars Pauley Perrette and Coté de Pablo.

A sequel to the soundtrack was released on November 3, 2009. NCIS: The Official TV Soundtrack; Vol. 2 is a single-disc, 12-track set that covers songs (many previously unreleased) featured throughout the seventh season of the show, including one recording titled "Bitter and Blue" by Weatherly, as well as two songs used in previous seasons.

== Reception ==
In 2016, The New York Times reported that NCIS "is most popular in rural areas", especially in rural Maine and Pennsylvania.

=== Broadcast ratings ===
Seasonal rankings (based on average total viewers per episode) of NCIS. Each American network television season starts in late September and ends in late May, which coincides with the completion of May sweeps.

- Since season 7, NCIS has been the most watched scripted show on American television; in the 2012–13 season it was the most watched program of the past year, surpassing both American Idol and NBC Sunday Night Football, which had ranked above it the previous three seasons.
- On January 15, 2013, NCIS surpassed its previous series high in viewers, with the season ten episode "Shiva" attracting 22.86 million viewers.

Viewership and ratings per season of NCIS
Season	Timeslot (ET)	Episodes	First aired	Last aired	TV season	Viewership rank	Avg. viewers (millions)	Avg. 18–49 rating
1	Tuesday 8:00 pm	23	September 23, 2003	May 25, 2004	2003–04	26	11.84	–
2	Tuesday 8:00 pm	23	September 28, 2004	May 24, 2005	2004–05	22	13.57	–
3	Tuesday 8:00 pm	24	September 20, 2005	May 16, 2006	2005–06	16	15.27	–
4	Tuesday 8:00 pm	24	September 19, 2006	May 22, 2007	2006–07	20	14.54	–
5	Tuesday 8:00 pm	19	September 25, 2007	May 20, 2008	2007–08	14	14.41	–
6	Tuesday 8:00 pm	25	September 23, 2008	May 19, 2009	2008–09	5	17.77	–
7	Tuesday 8:00 pm	24	September 22, 2009	May 25, 2010	2009–10	4	19.33	4.1
8	Tuesday 8:00 pm	24	September 21, 2010	May 17, 2011	2010–11	5	19.46	4.1
9	Tuesday 8:00 pm	24	September 20, 2011	May 15, 2012	2011–12	3	19.49	4.0
10	Tuesday 8:00 pm	24	September 25, 2012	May 14, 2013	2012–13	1	21.34	4.0
11	Tuesday 8:00 pm	24	September 24, 2013	May 13, 2014	2013–14	3	19.77	3.3
12	Tuesday 8:00 pm	24	September 23, 2014	May 12, 2015	2014–15	3	18.25	2.4
13	Tuesday 8:00 pm	24	September 22, 2015	May 17, 2016	2015–16	3	16.61	2.2
14	Tuesday 8:00 pm	24	September 20, 2016	May 16, 2017	2016–17	3	14.63	2.5
15	Tuesday 8:00 pm	24	September 26, 2017	May 22, 2018	2017–18	5	17.02	2.2
16	Tuesday 8:00 pm	24	September 25, 2018	May 21, 2019	2018–19	3	15.57	1.9
17	Tuesday 8:00 pm	20	September 24, 2019	April 14, 2020	2019–20	2	15.33	1.7
18	Tuesday 8:00 pm	16	November 17, 2020	May 25, 2021	2020–21	3	12.58	1.2
19	Monday 9:00 pm	21	September 20, 2021	May 23, 2022	2021–22	3	10.90	0.9
20	Monday 9:00 pm	22	September 19, 2022	May 22, 2023	2022–23	3	9.86	0.7
21	Monday 9:00 pm	10	February 12, 2024	May 6, 2024	2023–24	4	9.66	0.6
22	Monday 9:00 pm	20	October 14, 2024	May 5, 2025	2024–25	11	10.59	TBD
23	Tuesday 8:00 pm	20	October 14, 2025	May 12, 2026	2025–26	9	10.00	TBD

== Franchise ==
NCIS has produced seven spin-offs: NCIS: Los Angeles (2009–2023), NCIS: New Orleans (2014–2021), NCIS: Hawaiʻi (2021–2024), NCIS: Sydney (2023–), NCIS: Origins (2024–), NCIS: Tony & Ziva (2025) and NCIS: New York (2026–).

=== NCIS: Los Angeles ===
In November 2008, it was reported that a first spin-off series set in Los Angeles would be introduced with a two-part backdoor pilot during the sixth season of NCIS. The episode title "Legend (Part I)" and "Legend (Part II)", airing on April 28, 2009, and May 5, 2009. In May 2009, CBS picked up an NCIS spin-off series with the title NCIS: Los Angeles.

The series stars Chris O'Donnell as Special Agent G. Callen, LL Cool J as Special Agent Sam Hanna, Louise Lombard as Special Agent Lara Macy, Peter Cambor as Operational Psychologist Nate Getz, and Daniela Ruah as Special Agent Kensi Blye. Following the official pick-up by CBS, it was confirmed that Lombard would not continue her role as Special Agent Lara Macy. Linda Hunt and Adam Jamal Craig were added to the cast as OSP Manager Henrietta Lange and Special Agent Dom Vail respectively. Craig did not return for the second season and was replaced by Eric Christian Olsen as Marty Deeks promoted to series regular.

Characters from NCIS have appeared in the spin-off. Rocky Carroll portrayed Leon Vance in a recurring role, and Pauley Perrette portrayed Abby Sciuto, with a guest appearance in the season 1 episodes "Killshot" and "Random on Purpose".

NCIS: Los Angeles was created by Shane Brennan. In April 2011, NCIS creator Donald Bellisario sued CBS over NCIS: Los Angeles because of his contract which gave him "first opportunity" to develop a spin-off or sequel; the lawsuit was dismissed by a judge in June 2012. However, discussions continued between CBS and Bellisario, and in January 2013 the dispute was settled outside of court a week before it was set to go to trial; the terms of the agreement were not disclosed but were described as being amicable.

=== NCIS: New Orleans ===
In September 2013, it was reported that a second spin-off series set in New Orleans would be introduced with a two-part backdoor pilot during the eleventh season of NCIS. The episode title "Crescent City (Part I)" and "Crescent City (Part II)". The episodes were filmed in February 2014, and aired on March 25, 2014, and April 1, 2014. NCIS star Mark Harmon and showrunner Gary Glasberg are the executive producers of the series. Glasberg discussed the idea of the episode with Harmon, who said "That's more than a sweeps episode" (meaning an episode with provocative subject manner and top appeal for television ratings). The premise for the episodes are, according to Glasberg, "all about this tiny little NCIS office that's down [in New Orleans], and the kind of cases that they come across". In May 2014, CBS picked up an NCIS second spin-off series with the title NCIS: New Orleans.

The series stars Scott Bakula as Special Agent Dwayne Cassius Pride, Lucas Black as Special Agent Christopher LaSalle, Zoe McLellan as Special Agent Meredith "Merri" Brody, Rob Kerkovich as Sebastian Lund, and CCH Pounder as Dr. Loretta Wade. Daryl "Chill" Mitchell, Shalita Grant and Vanessa Ferlito joined the main cast later, portrayed as computer specialist Patton Plame, Special Agent Sonja Percy, and Special Agent Tammy Gregorio, respectively.

NCIS and NCIS: New Orleans have had two crossovers.

- "Sister City" (season 13): Abby's brother is suspected of poisoning the passengers and crew of a private plane flying from New Orleans to Washington, D.C.
- "Pandora's Box" (season 14): A theoretical terror playbook is stolen and put up for auction on the black market when Abby's homeland security think tank is compromised.

=== NCIS: Hawaiʻi ===
On February 16, 2021, it was reported that a spin-off set in Hawaii was in the works from NCIS: New Orleans executive producers Christopher Silber and Jan Nash. On April 23, 2021, it was announced that CBS had given the production a straight-to-series order to the spin-off, and intended to include the franchise's first female lead character. The show debuted on CBS on September 20, 2021, with Vanessa Lachey in the leading role. It was canceled after 3 seasons, with its final episode airing on May 6, 2024.

=== NCIS: Sydney ===
On February 16, 2022, it was reported that a spin-off set in Sydney, Australia, was in the works. NCIS: Los Angeles producer Shane Brennan would be attached to the project. The series is the first international spin-off for the NCIS franchise and would feature local Australian actors and producers. It was released in Australia on Paramount+ from November 10, 2023, and later debuted on Network 10 in mid-2024. It also aired on CBS in the United States from November 14, 2023, as a result of the suspension of other NCIS productions due to the 2023 Hollywood labor disputes, and is available for streaming in selected territories internationally on Paramount+.

The cast is led by Olivia Swann and Todd Lasance, with Sean Sagar, Tuuli Narkle, Mavournee Hazel and William McInnes.

=== NCIS: Origins ===
On January 5, 2024, it was announced that a spin-off and prequel series based on Leroy Jethro Gibbs's early days as an NCIS agent was in the works. Mark Harmon is set to reprise his role as Gibbs in a narrator role. The series premiered on October 14, 2024. In March 2024, it was announced that Austin Stowell will be cast in the role of Leroy Jethro Gibbs.

=== NCIS: Tony & Ziva ===
On February 28, 2024, it was announced that Paramount+ had ordered another spin-off of NCIS of 10 episodes focusing on Michael Weatherly and Cote de Pablo's characters Tony DiNozzo and Ziva David. On May 7, 2024, the title was confirmed as NCIS: Tony & Ziva. It debuted on September 4, 2025, and was canceled three months later in December.

=== NCIS: New York ===
On April 15, 2026, it was announced that a spin-off set in New York City was given a straight-to-series order. LL Cool J will reprise his role as Sam Hanna from the LA spin-off, co-starring with Scott Caan. The series will debut in late 2026.

== Awards and nominations ==
NCIS has received many awards and nominations since it premiered on September 23, 2003, including the ALMA Awards, ASCAP Awards, BMI Film & TV Awards, Emmy Awards, and People's Choice Awards.
