= NCIS season 15 =

Season of television series

NCIS
- Season 15
- Season 15 U.S. DVD cover
- Starring: Mark Harmon; Pauley Perrette; Sean Murray; Wilmer Valderrama; Maria Bello; Emily Wickersham; Brian Dietzen; Duane Henry; Rocky Carroll; David McCallum
- No. of episodes: 24

Release
- Original network: CBS
- Original release: September 26, 2017 – May 22, 2018

Season chronology
- ← Previous; Season 14 Next → Season 16

The fifteenth season of the American police procedural drama NCIS premiered on September 26, 2017, in the same time slot as in the previous seasons, Tuesdays at 8 PM. The season premiere was watched by 17.42 million viewers, picking up two months after Gibbs and McGee were last seen fighting a group of rebels in Paraguay and focused on the aftermath of those events. The season concluded on May 22, 2018 and contained 24 episodes.

NCIS revolves around a fictional team of special agents from the Naval Criminal Investigative Service, which conducts criminal investigations involving the U.S. Navy and Marine Corps. Jennifer Esposito, who portrayed Special Agent Alexandra Quinn, did not return as a series regular this season. Maria Bello joined the cast as Dr. Jacqueline "Jack" Sloane, NCIS Senior Resident Agent and operational psychologist (episodes 4–24). After 15 years of playing Abby Sciuto, Pauley Perrette left the show in episode 22 "Two Steps Back." Duane Henry, who plays Clayton Reeves, also left the show as he was killed off in the same episode. CBS renewed NCIS for both seasons fourteen and fifteen on Monday, February 29, 2016.

== Cast and characters ==
=== Main ===
- Mark Harmon as Leroy Jethro Gibbs, NCIS Supervisory Special Agent (SSA) of the Major Case Response Team (MCRT) assigned to Washington's Navy Yard
- Pauley Perrette as Abby Sciuto, Forensic Specialist for NCIS (until episode 22)
- Sean Murray as Timothy McGee, NCIS Senior Special Agent, Second in Command of MCRT
- Wilmer Valderrama as Nick Torres, NCIS Special Agent
- Maria Bello as Dr. Jacqueline "Jack" Sloane, NCIS Senior Resident Agent and Operational Psychologist (special guest episode 4, main cast starting episode 5)
- Emily Wickersham as Eleanor "Ellie" Bishop, NCIS Special Agent
- Brian Dietzen as Dr. Jimmy Palmer, Assistant Medical Examiner for NCIS
- Duane Henry as Clayton Reeves, MI6 Senior Officer and liaison to NCIS (until episode 22)
- Rocky Carroll as Leon Vance, NCIS Director
- David McCallum as Dr. Donald "Ducky" Mallard, Chief Medical Examiner for NCIS

=== Recurring ===
- Joe Spano as Tobias Fornell, former FBI Senior Special Agent
- Robert Wagner as Anthony DiNozzo, Sr., father of former NCIS Special Agent Anthony DiNozzo
- Jack Conley as Danny Sportelli, Metro P.D. Detective Sergeant
- Margo Harshman as Delilah Fielding-McGee, DoD Intelligence Analyst and McGee's wife
- Patrick Labyorteaux as Bud Roberts, JAG Captain from Falls Church
- French Stewart as Paul Triff, incarcerated serial killer
- Laura San Giacomo as Dr. Grace Confalone, psychotherapist
- Marco Sanchez as Alejandro Rivera, incarcerated former official in the Mexican Justice Department and enemy of Gibbs
- Pej Vahdat as Nigel Hakim, British Humanitarian
- Kent Shocknek as Guy Ross, ZNN News Anchor
- Sumalee Montano as Nicole Taggart, NCIS Special Agent
- Diona Reasonover as Kasie Hines, Forensic Specialist for NCIS and temporary replacement for Abby after she resigns
- Naomi Grace as Kayla Vance, Leon Vance's daughter
- Hilary Ward as Jessica Shaeffer, Defense Attorney
- Don Lake as Phillip Brooks, Navy Captain
- Peter Jason as Robert King, Biological Weapons Specialist

=== Guest appearances ===
- Muse Watson as Mike Franks, deceased retired Senior Special Agent for NCIS and Gibbs' former boss
- Drew Carey as John Ross, retired Marine Sergeant
- Kevin Pollak as Albert Hathaway, convicted Investment Advisor
- Dan Lauria as Morgan Cade, Emergency Room Guard
- Trevor Donovan as Thomas Buckner, Navy Commander
- Susan Blakely as Cadence Darwin, Ducky's friend
- Gwendoline Yeo as Joanna Wright, NCIS Special Agent
- Jake Busey as Whit Dexter, Radio Host
- Mike Wolfe as himself
- Amanda Payton as Misty Boxlarter

== Episodes ==
No. overall	No. in season	Title	Directed by	Written by	Original release date	Prod. code	U.S. viewers (millions)
331	1	"House Divided"	Tony Wharmby	Steven D. Binder	September 26, 2017	1501	13.29
Part 2 of 2: After events in "Rendezvous" Torres orders the Navy helicopter pilot to turn around, in vain. Two months later, Bishop is the agent in charge of NCIS. Torres testifies before a Congressional committee. The team invesitages drug mule Zachary Brooke's death which leads to Abby finding radiation poisoning from RAC's uranium. Somewhere in Paraguay, Jefe's RAC doctor tortures Gibbs and McGee. McGee contrives a fight during which Gibbs purloins a guard's knife to free them. Gibbs rescues McGee, conspiring with disaffected rebel Nicolas Rebollo. Off the record, the committee authorizes Vance's rescue, coordinating with NCIS-SA Nicole Taggart in Asunción. For location, Bishop installs the dating app on Jefe's satphone. A rebel suspicious of Gibbs, disguised as Jefe, forces a firefight, drawing others. But McGee's faked radiation leak alarm provides a diversion. Gibbs gives Jefe to Rebollo for revenge, while they escape on the helicopter.
332	2	"Twofer"	James Whitmore Jr.	Scott Williams	October 3, 2017	1502	13.50
icon
333	3	"Exit Strategy"	Terrence O'Hara	Christopher J. Waild	October 10, 2017	1503	13.60
icon
334	4	"Skeleton Crew"	Rocky Carroll	Jennifer Corbett	October 17, 2017	1504	12.85
In the midst of a storm that has shut down Washington, DC and knocked out power, the NCIS team investigates the kidnapping of a sailor, which sends Torres and Bishop out to sea to track evidence. This is the first "Special Guest Star" appearance of Maria Bello as Jacqueline Sloane.
335	5	"Fake It 'Til You Make It"	Thomas J. Wright	David J. North	October 24, 2017	1506	13.30
Maria Bello is added to the opening credits.
336	6	"Trapped"	Bethany Rooney	Brendan Fehily	October 31, 2017	1505	12.11
icon
337	7	"Burden of Proof"	Dennis Smith	Gina Lucita Monreal	November 7, 2017	1507	13.47
Convicted felon Gabriel Hicks swears that NCIS framed him for murder a decade ago, so Gibbs begins his own investigation starting with a new autopsy by Ducky. They quickly determine two serious issues: the killer was left-handed while Hicks is right-handed, and there was a mysterious witness who was never found. Senior FBI Agent Fornell joins the team, since he was the lead investigator in the original joint FBI and NCIS case, but only to convince Gibbs that Hicks is lying. When the witness is found, Gibbs learns that not only was Hicks not the person they saw, but Fornell found her at the time and buried this evidence to convict Hicks. Forced to choose between destroying his friend's career or keeping an innocent man imprisoned, Gibbs reveals the evidence and Hicks is released. Gibbs later discovers that Hicks is in fact ambidextrous, meaning he played them all.
338	8	"Voices"	Tony Wharmby	Steven D. Binder	November 14, 2017	1508	13.08
After voices inside a woman's head lead her to the body of a contractor suspected of corruption, the team is requested to use her to figure out what happened only to find she may be hiding more than she realizes. Meanwhile, McGee and Delilah disagree about finding out their child's gender.
339	9	"Ready or Not"	Terrence O'Hara	Scott Williams	November 21, 2017	1509	12.54
While preparing for Thanksgiving, the team hunts for international arms dealer Andre Yorka, who recently murdered an MI5 officer who was Sloane's close friend. Things gets more complicated when the arms dealer shows up at the same hospital Delilah and McGee are in, and it’s up to McGee and Emergency Room Guard Morgan Cade to keep everyone safe.
340	10	"Double Down"	Alrick Riley	Christopher J. Waild	December 12, 2017	1510	12.58
Sloane and Torres are on assignment protecting a senator (and one of Gibbs' friends) in Afghanistan, but it is called off early when his son suffers a damaging fall. Sloane and Torres attempt to get the senator back to the U.S. as safely as possible, but due to the congressman’s continual interference in the hope of getting there faster, the group end up stranded in the desert after driving through a minefield on the wrong route, with insurgents in the area and life-threatening injuries. Now they must try to survive long enough to find a way to reach help while trying to get back before the son dies.
341	11	"High Tide"	Tony Wharmby	David J. North & Steven D. Binder	January 2, 2018	1512	14.10
icon
342	12	"Dark Secrets"	Bethany Rooney	George Schenck & Frank Cardea	January 9, 2018	1511	14.24
icon
343	13	"Family Ties"	Rocky Carroll	Brendan Fehily	January 23, 2018	1513	13.97
icon
344	14	"Keep Your Friends Close"	Mark Horowitz	Gina Lucita Monreal	February 6, 2018	1514	13.90
Part 1 of 2: Virginia State Troopers arrest Ozzie Duncan driving a stolen van, containing Navy Commander James Willis' dead body. Willis' wife Sarah mentions a P.I. – Fornell, who the FBI fired (after events in "Burden of Proof"), was investigating delinquent loans and discovered Willis fighting Commander Sean Evans. Abby determines the bullet matches professional hits. Bishop learns Willis was jury foreman in "Ponzi King" Albert Hathaway's trial. Abby links rags to Crime Scene Tru-Clean. Julia Marino fired Michael and Joey Barrett for stealing. Torres captures one, Tobias tazes another. Their second "hit" cleanup is pending. Sloane surveils suspected serial killer Gabriel Hicks, warning his attorney Jessica Shaeffer that he is guilty and dangerous. Gibbs and Bishop intercept and kill the hitman, Dominic Malecki, at juror Patrice Jansen's house. Gibbs learns she and Willis had an affair. NCIS arrests Sarah, who admits the contract hit was for the affair, for spending their life savings on his sick mother, and to collect his life insurance payout. After arguing, Gibbs enlists Fornell to investigate Hicks. Shaeffer "told Hicks to secure new counsel," telling Sloane, "don't stop digging," right before Shaeffer's car explodes, knocking Sloane unconscious. To be continued...
345	15	"Keep Your Enemies Closer"	Thomas J. Wright	Jennifer Corbett	February 27, 2018	1515	12.45
Part 2 of 2: Continuing from last episode, Danielle orders coffee from barista Gabriel Hicks, as Bishop and Torres question him about Jessica's murder. Without concrete evidence, Vance is forced to release Hicks. Abby recovers Jessica's bugged phone, revealing she interviewed Hicks' former cellmate, convicted murderer Paul Triff (from "What Lies Above"), who bargains for a "48-hour work furlough" to "assist with the case" with McGee supervising while Triff stays in his old residence (now Tim's and Delilah's home). Triff hints, search inside Hicks' van from ten years prior, still in FBI impound. Gibbs finds a bloody pipe and Abby matches lieutenant O'Connell's blood and four other profiles from unsolved murders. Witness Mary Elaine Smith tells NCIS Hicks threatened to kill her nephew. Sloane procures Hicks' juvenile records and psych evaluation, concluding he kills father figures. Gibbs realizes Hicks is trying to split them up. Hicks abducts Fornell, going to McGee's to get to Triff, who, as his "mentor" father-figure, berates and antagonizes Hicks, who decides to kill Triff, who busts open his cage door to attack Hicks, who shoots Triff. Gibbs chases Hicks. Entering through the trunk, Fornell choke-holds Hicks who crashes. After a struggle, Gibbs tazes Hicks, arresting him.
346	16	"Handle with Care"	Alrick Riley	Scott J. Jarrett & Matthew R. Jarrett	March 6, 2018	1516	12.92
icon
347	17	"One Man's Trash"	Michael Zinberg	Scott Williams	March 13, 2018	1517	13.26
On American Pickers, Gibbs and Ducky spot an antique ceremonial Viking war stick they believe might solve the sixteen year-old cold case murder of Navy PO Marvin Finn. George Keogh is offered $25,000 after his wife accepted Mike Wolfe's $3,000. Things get complicated after the team finds antique dealer Roy Baxter dead, after Red Eagle Financial CEO Clarence Wyatt purchased Paton's famous Colt revolver. Meanwhile, Kasie Hines visits NCIS to help finish Ducky’s book. Abby has difficulty connecting with Kasie, who is congenial to everyone else. This is the first "guest star" appearance of Diona Reasonover as Kasie Hines
348	18	"Death from Above"	Rocky Carroll	Christopher J. Waild	March 27, 2018	1518	11.94
icon
349	19	"The Numerical Limit"	Leslie Libman	David J. North & Steven D. Binder	April 3, 2018	1519	12.23
icon
350	20	"Sight Unseen"	Bethany Rooney	Brendan Fehily	April 17, 2018	1520	11.58
icon
351	21	"One Step Forward"	James Whitmore Jr.	Gina Lucita Monreal	May 1, 2018	1521	12.35
Part 1 of 2: Sara Carter punches a Navy yard guard, needing Gibbs to solve the year-old murder case of her mother, retired CPO Mae Carter, a master-at-arms command investigator. The team finds out Sara and her son Theo are homeless and Sara was getting off the street prescription drugs. Sloane describes Sara's TBI from her service in Afghanistan. After dining at The Cooler, a mugger shoots at Reeves who dies protecting Abby.
352	22	"Two Steps Back"	Michael Zinberg	Jennifer Corbett	May 8, 2018	1522	15.08
Part 2 of 2: With Reeves shot dead, doctors remove a bullet from Abby's chest, and she fights for survival. On Reeves' shirt, Bishop finds the blood profile of dishonorably discharged Army Specialist Kent Marshall, who they find slain, throat cut, learning Abby was a targeted hit. Top suspect is embezzler Terry Spooner, but Sloane thinks otherwise. Gibbs questions Alejandro Rivera, who denies involvement. Abby wakes, but cannot remember the shooting. Later, Bishop connects Marshal to Tom Reese, aka Sergeant Major of the Marine Corps Robert King (after events in "Toxic"), whose prison cell is now occupied by nightshift guard Brendan Denridge. Abby discovers her restaurant invitation was not random, and backtraces the IP, finding and confronting King herself, alone, citing Gibbs' Rule #45 ("Clean up the mess that you make"). She claims to have slipped cyanide into King's coffee that will kill him within the hour, holding up hydrocobalamin as an antidote. "Confess and you get to live." He admits hiring Marshal. Torres and Gibbs arrest him. Later, McGee learns the "cyanide" was actually crushed Caf-Pow! pills, mimicking symptoms. Abby escorts Clay's body to London for burial, announcing "I'm leaving NCIS," vowing to establish Clayton’s in honor of his mother. This is the final appearance by Pauley Perrette and Duane Henry as NCIS series regulars. They remain in the opening credits for the rest of the season.
353	23	"Fallout"	Terrence O'Hara	Teleplay by : David J. North & Christopher J. Waild; Story by : Christopher J. Waild	May 15, 2018	1523	12.71
As NCIS adjusts to losing Abby and Reeves, Steve and David comment at the late Captain Phil Brooks' wake about his sailboat Marcy, named after his wife. Paying respects, Gibbs finds Brooks alive in a fallout shelter, hiding after gunfire from a motorboat forced him overboard. CGIS Special Agent Amanda Graham endorses, "NCIS keeps digging, so do I." Kasie Hines temps in the lab and finds a bullet gouge in the Marcy's mast. Bishop uncovers compromising photos that Brooks claims were faked, which Kasie proves. McGee questions Antonia Morello, a store lessee in Brooks' strip mall who suspects "greedy investors" from Capital Clients Incorporated doctored her photos. NCIS plays undercover golf with investors Sean Parks, Glen Collins, and Vendrell Brown, with Palmer as a surprise ringer. Things get complicated after SA Graham is found murdered. During the case, the team struggles to whether or not to tell Marcy Brooks that Phil is alive.
354	24	"Date with Destiny"	Tony Wharmby	Scott Williams & George Schenck & Frank Cardea	May 22, 2018	1524	12.07
Part 1 of 2: While on a blind date with Ray Martin, set up by McGee and Delilah, Sloane hears a man she recognizes as Masahun, who captured and tortured her and her WINGOS psyops squadmates, Specialists Ray Hale and Samuel King, and Sergeant Safwan Anshiri. Sloane is arrested for attacking him. Vance tasks Kasie and McGee to investigate, identifying him as humanitarian Nigel Hakim, attached to the British embassy. Replaying audio of Hakim, Sloane's fellow captive Captain Chester Kelb recognizes Masahun. Determined to avenge her colleagues’ deaths, Sloane leaves to find Hakim. Gibbs intervenes to apprehend Hakim, but find Hakim already took another flight. Meanwhile, after ruling out PO3 Stephanie Vairo and seaman Felix Pittorino, NCIS debunks a bomb threat aboard the destroyer Ulysses, instigated by Parker to delay deployment and spend more time with his father Commander Daly. Unknown to the team, Vance, who had stormed Masahun's compound in Afghanistan to rescue Sloane and Kelb, has been kidnapped by Hakim who says, "You killed so many of my brothers. Infidel." To be continued...

== Production ==
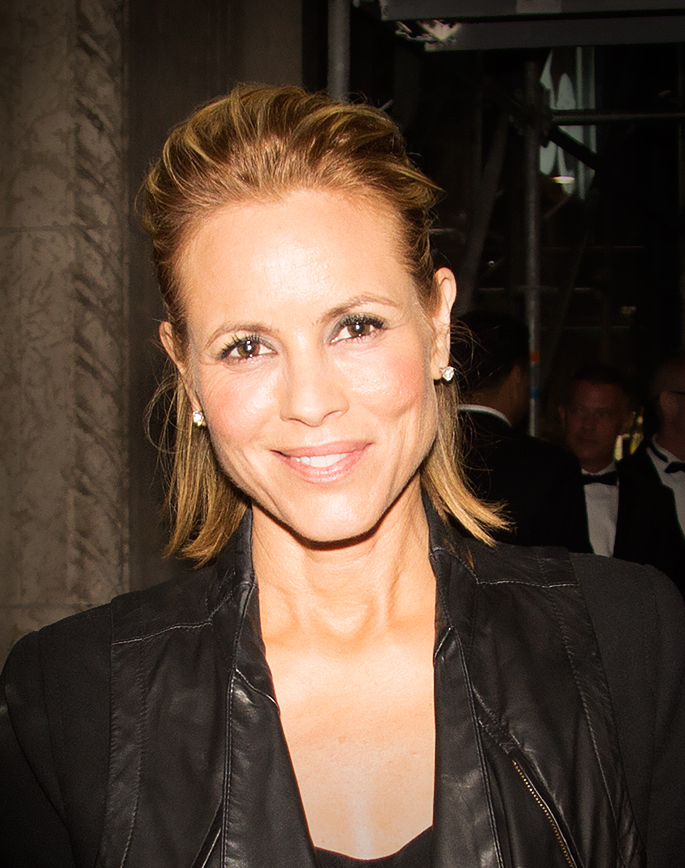
Maria Bello's first season as a regular

The series was renewed for fourteenth and fifteenth seasons by CBS on Monday, February 29, 2016. It was announced that Jennifer Esposito, who portrayed NCIS agent Alexandra Quinn, had departed and would be replaced by Maria Bello as Agent Jackie Sloane — a new series regular, beginning with episode 15:5. Bello inked a three-year deal to remain with the show through until the end of its seventeenth season. Production began in July 2017 with the rest of cast members returning.

Showrunners Frank Cardea and George Schenck (in their first full season at the helm) wanted to focus Season 15 around a "good mystery and more stand-alone episodes than two or three-parters." However, they noted that they wouldn't shy away from multi-part episodes if the story was deemed worth it. This season included a three-episode arc revolving around serial killer Gabriel Hicks, the episodes being: "Burden of Proof", "Keep Your Friends Close", and "Keep Your Enemies Closer".

As to Quinn's departure, Special Agent Torres (Wilmer Valderrama) stated in 15:1 ("House Divided") that Quinn is now on leave taking care of her mother; this coincides with a running story-arc her character had maintained for some time. The specific turnover point between Quinn & Sloane's characters occurs at the end of 15:4, when Bello's character premieres. In another central casting announcement, TV Line reported on October 4, 2017, that founding NCIS actress Pauley Perrette would be leaving the role of "Abby Sciuto" after the conclusion of season fifteen. Perrette's final episode was episode 22, which aired on May 8, 2018. Also, in this episode, Duane Henry (Clayton Reeves) was written off the show.

NCIS was renewed for a sixteenth season on April 13, 2018, following a deal with Mark Harmon to return for an additional two years.

== Reception ==
Season 15 was praised for its sharp cases and bringing new life into characters and series, with Matt Carter of CarterMatt.com citing "the arrival of Maria Bello and the creative direction of the new showrunners; this has been the best season overall since season 10" as chief reasons for this revival. Sara Netzley of Entertainment Weekly said, in reference to the positive changes, "now here's the show we’ve enjoyed for years", noting that it was "dark and twisty", giving it an 'A' rating.

Season 15 of NCIS was CBS's most watched and highest rated drama on their network for another year. While being the most watched drama nationally, beating NBC's megahit This Is Us and ABC's The Good Doctor, it also finished as the sixth most watched television program overall for 2017–2018 season.

== Home media ==
A DVD and Blu-ray of the fifteenth season of NCIS was announced for August 21, 2018.

== Ratings ==
Viewership and ratings per episode of NCIS season 15
No.	Title	Air date	Rating/share (18–49)	Viewers (millions)	DVR (18–49)	DVR viewers (millions)	Total (18–49)	Total viewers (millions)
1	"House Divided"	September 26, 2017	1.6/6	13.29	0.9	4.13	2.5	17.42
2	"Twofer"	October 3, 2017	1.4/5	13.50	0.8	3.89	2.2	17.40
3	"Exit Strategy"	October 10, 2017	1.4/6	13.60	0.8	3.79	2.2	17.40
4	"Skeleton Crew"	October 17, 2017	1.4/5	12.85	0.8	4.13	2.2	16.98
5	"Fake It 'til You Make It"	October 24, 2017	1.4/5	13.30	0.7	3.83	2.1	17.14
6	"Trapped"	October 31, 2017	1.2/5	12.11	0.8	3.85	2.0	15.96
7	"Burden of Proof"	November 7, 2017	1.5/6	13.47	0.7	3.98	2.2	17.45
8	"Voices"	November 14, 2017	1.5/6	13.08	—N/a	3.65	—N/a	16.74
9	"Ready or Not"	November 21, 2017	1.4/5	12.54	0.6	3.54	2.0	16.08
10	"Double Down"	December 12, 2017	1.4/5	13.08	—N/a	—N/a	—N/a	—N/a
11	"High Tide"	January 2, 2018	1.5/6	14.10	0.8	3.87	2.3	17.98
12	"Dark Secrets"	January 9, 2018	1.5/6	14.24	0.8	3.89	2.3	18.13
13	"Family Ties"	January 23, 2018	1.5/6	13.97	0.8	4.20	2.3	18.17
14	"Keep Your Friends Close"	February 6, 2018	1.5/6	13.90	0.8	4.11	2.3	18.01
15	"Keep Your Enemies Closer"	February 27, 2018	1.2/5	12.45	0.9	4.26	2.1	16.72
16	"Handle with Care"	March 6, 2018	1.4/6	12.92	0.8	4.43	2.2	17.35
17	"One Man's Trash"	March 13, 2018	1.5/6	13.26	0.7	4.02	2.2	17.28
18	"Death From Above"	March 27, 2018	1.3/5	11.94	0.8	4.35	2.1	16.29
19	"The Numerical Limit"	April 3, 2018	1.3/5	12.23	0.7	3.73	2.0	15.87
20	"Sight Unseen"	April 17, 2018	1.2/4	11.58	0.8	3.70	1.9	15.15
21	"One Step Forward"	May 1, 2018	1.2/5	12.35	0.8	4.38	2.0	16.74
22	"Two Steps Back"	May 8, 2018	1.6/7	15.08	0.9	4.32	2.5	19.40
23	"Fallout"	May 15, 2018	1.3/5	12.71	0.7	3.80	1.9	16.51
24	"Date with Destiny"	May 22, 2018	1.3/5	12.07	0.7	3.83	2.0	15.90
