= A Gingerbread Romance =

- Poster
- Written by: Barbara Kymlicka; Gregg Rossen; Brian Sawyer
- Directed by: Richard Gabai
- Starring: Tia Mowry; Duane Henry
- Country of origin: United States
- Original language: English

Production
- Running time: 90 minutes

Original release
- Network: Hallmark Channel
- Release: December 16, 2018

A Gingerbread Romance is a 2018 American television film directed by Richard Gabai and starring Tia Mowry and Duane Henry.

== Plot ==
With Christmas just weeks away, the architecture firm Taylor works for enters her in a contest in which the teams will design and build life-sized gingerbread houses. After the contest, Taylor will likely be getting a promotion to a position in another city. The firm teams her up with Annabelle, a renowned French pastry chef with whom Taylor instantly locks horns. When Annabelle backs out, Taylor stumbles into a local bakery and meets Adam, a baker and single dad. In an act of desperation, Taylor convinces Adam to partner with her for the contest, arguing that winning would give the bakery and his designs much-needed exposure. For years Taylor has been resistant to call anywhere 'home' for fear it will only be temporary. But the time she spends with Adam and his daughter in their cosy home, decorating for the holidays and exploring the town at Christmas, fills her with a longing for a place to call home.

== Cast ==
- Tia Mowry-Hardrict as Taylor Scott
- Duane Henry as Adam Dale

== Production ==
The film was shot in Vancouver.
