= List of JAG characters =

American tv series characters (1995–2005)

Cast of JAG

This is an overview of the regular and recurring characters of long-running series JAG.

Note: All ranks are those shown or stated by the end of the series.

== Overview ==
=== Main characters ===
Character	Actor	Season									
Character	Actor	1	2	3	4	5	6	7	8	9	10
Captain Harmon "Harm" Rabb Jr., USN (JAGC)	David James Elliott	Main	Main	Main	Main	Main	Main	Main	Main	Main	Main
Lieutenant, Junior Grade Meg Austin, USN (JAGC)	Tracey Needham	Main	—	—	—	—	—	—	—	—	—
Lieutenant Colonel Sarah "Mac" MacKenzie, USMC (JAGC)	Catherine Bell	—	Main	Main	Main	Main	Main	Main	Main	Main	Main
Lieutenant Commander Bud J. Roberts Jr., USN (JAGC)	Patrick Labyorteaux	Recurring	Main	Main	Main	Main	Main	Main	Main	Main	Main
Rear Admiral Albert Jethro "A.J." Chegwidden, USN, Retired (JAGC)	John M. Jackson	Recurring	Main	Main	Main	Main	Main	Main	Main	Main	—
Lieutenant Harriet Sims, USN	Karri Turner	—	Main	Main	Main	Main	Main	Main	Main	Main	Main
Commander Peter Ulysses "Sturgis" Turner, USN (JAGC)	Scott Lawrence	—	—	—	—	—	—	Recurring	Recurring	Recurring	Main
Legalman First Class (LN1) Jennifer "Jen" Coates, USN	Zoe McLellan	—	—	—	—	—	—	Recurring	Recurring	Recurring	Main
Major General Gordon "Biff" Cresswell, USMC (JAGC)	David Andrews	—	—	—	—	—	—	—	—	—	Main

== Main characters ==
=== Captain Harmon "Harm" Rabb Jr., USN (JAGC) ===
Played by David James Elliott.

A naval aviator who became a JAG lawyer after being diagnosed with night blindness. His father was shot down over Vietnam and was listed as MIA, with Harm's attempts to find him forming the plots of several episodes. He became strong friends with Major (eventually Lieutenant Colonel) Sarah "Mac" MacKenzie, USMC, and their relationship grew through the years. Throughout the series the pair acknowledged that they were in love with each other, without it developing into a relationship. In the series finale, Harm and Mac became engaged to be married and toss a coin to decide who would accept a new assignment (Harm in London, Mac in San Diego) and who would resign their commission to follow the coin-toss winner. The series ended with the coin still in the air. Harm was promoted three times during the series' run, being first introduced in the pilot episode as a lieutenant and ending with the rank of captain in the second to last episode. Harm was a lieutenant commander and commander for most of the series' run.

Harm reappears in the final two episodes of NCIS: Los Angeles season 10 and the first episode of season 11. It is revealed here that while he lost the coin toss and resigned his JAG commission, he later re-enlisted after breaking off his engagement with Mac. At some point after returning to the Navy, he was promoted to captain and returned to active duty as a line officer, serving as the executive officer on the fictional aircraft carrier the USS Allegiance.

=== Lieutenant, Junior Grade Meg Austin, USN (JAGC) ===
Played by Tracey Needham. Season 1.

Introduced in the second episode, Austin was Rabb's second partner for most of the first season, replacing LT JG Caitlin Pike from the pilot movie. She was known to be skilled in computers and fluent in Spanish. Needham left the series after season one, and her character was replaced in the following season by Major Sarah MacKenzie.

=== Lieutenant Colonel Sarah "Mac" MacKenzie, USMC (JAGC) ===
Played by Catherine Bell.

A Marine lawyer, who later became chief of staff under Chegwidden and Cresswell, partnered with "Harm" and became his best friend and constantly dealt with "whatever" it was between the two of them. "Mac" had the gift of gab and great tenacity in the courtroom for justice but somehow always had trouble with the men in her life. She had a terrible childhood with her abusive alcoholic father and a mother who abandoned her on her 15th birthday. She suffered from alcoholism but sobered up and joined the Marine Corps at age 19. She dealt with her past in the season 4 episodes "Mr. Rabb Goes to Washington," "People v. Mac," and "Second Sight". For three seasons, Mac was a major. She was promoted once in the series' run from major to lieutenant colonel. She was also promoted from JAG lawyer to JAG chief of staff, the second in command under Chegwidden and later Cresswell. Until the series finale, she was senior to Harm by two months.

Mac returned in the season finale of NCIS: Los Angeles season 10 and the premiere of season 11. It is revealed that she won the coin toss, but that her engagement to Harm did not last. At some point she left the San Diego JAG office and became the Marine liaison to the secretary of state. It is possible that Mac has joined the Individual Ready Reserve as she would not have spent a further fifteen years on active duty without a promotion or mandatory retirement. While not stated it could be inferred from the fact that Mac is not seen in uniform and Bud has been promoted to captain prior to this point.

Bell had originally appeared on the series in Season 1 as a separate character, the deceased Lt. Diane Schonke, and her physical resemblance to Mac was written into the plot.

=== Lieutenant Commander Bud J. Roberts Jr., USN (JAGC) ===
Played by Patrick Labyorteaux.

Originally an ensign in charge of public affairs on board the USS Seahawk, who appeared in the pilot episode, Bud later becomes a JAG lawyer. He has a younger brother, Mikey (Michael Bellisario), who had aspirations of being an artist before enlisting in the Navy and qualifying as a radar and gunnery technician, then being accepted into the Naval Academy as a midshipman. They had a complex relationship with their father, "Big Bud" Sr. (Jeff MacKay), a retired Master Chief, who was borderline abusive when they were children, perhaps due to the strain of having to raise them himself after the death of their mother. He mentioned having a sister named "Winnifred" or "Winnie" in season 2, but she is never shown. He loses his right leg when he accidentally steps on a landmine in Afghanistan during the season 7 finale, but goes through rehabilitation and is allowed to stay in the Navy. Bud is promoted three times during the series' run: first from ensign to lieutenant junior grade, second from lieutenant junior grade to lieutenant, and lastly from lieutenant to lieutenant commander. Both Harm and Mac ask Bud to join them in their new commands after being reassigned across the world in the series finale; Bud politely turns them down because his wife wants him and their family to stay in the D.C. area, but he is also present at the Mac and Harm's engagement party during the final scene of the series, flipping the coin that will decide who quits their job to join the other.

Bud crosses over three times into episodes of NCIS: the season 1 episode "Hung Out to Dry", the season 14 episode "Rogue", and the season 15 episode "Dark Secrets". In his second NCIS appearance, set 11 years after the finale of the JAG series, he is now a captain and still a JAG officer.

Actor Patrick Labyorteaux appeared in the pilot of JAG, but could not appear for most of the rest of the season due to commitments to The Last Frontier. The latter's early cancellation allowed Labyorteaux to return to the series and become a main character.

=== Rear Admiral Albert Jethro "A.J." Chegwidden, USN, Retired (JAGC) ===
Played by John M. Jackson, Season 1–9, 193 episodes.

He was a no-nonsense, gruff CO and former Navy SEAL but always had his "people's" back. When he announced his retirement, the JAG staffers were legitimately sad to be losing his leadership and friendship. In Season 3, he showed slight romantic interest in Mac but their friendship and UCMJ implications caused them to nip it in the bud. A.J. became the father figure for many of the JAG staff. He had an Italian ex-wife and daughter who were featured in a kidnapping plot in the Season 4 episode "Going After Francesca." He loved baseball and once mentioned he was drafted by the Cleveland Indians, but declined a contract in order to serve his country during wartime. He was nominated for a seat on a high-level civilian court but turned it down after being confronted with the unethical positions of the Congressman who nominated him.

He would later appear in the 10th-season finale of NCIS when NCIS Director Vance retained him as Special Agent Gibbs' lawyer and in several episodes of NCIS: Los Angeles, in season 8 and season 9.

John M. Jackson had previously played a role as an officer overseeing protagonist JAG lawyers in A Few Good Men.

=== Harriet Sims ===
Played by Karri Turner, from Crossing the Line until Fair Winds and Following Seas.

Ensign Harriet Sims was first introduced serving as public affairs officer aboard the aircraft carrier USS Seahawk. Later in the second season, she becomes part of the administrative staff at JAG HQ. Harriet Sims comes from a wealthy family, as evidenced by the fact her parents live in a mansion located in Naples, Florida. Harriet marries Bud in the third season.

Harriet gave birth to "Little A.J." in May 1999, in Admiral Chegwidden's office. Harriet and Bud lost their daughter, Sarah, during childbirth in fall 2000. Since then, Harriet had a boy, "James Kirk" in 2003. At the end of the ninth season it is revealed Harriet is pregnant with twins.

Harriet was promoted twice during the run of JAG, first from ensign to lieutenant junior grade in the fourth season, and in the sixth season from lieutenant junior grade to lieutenant.

==== Character name ====
The first name of character was named after Harriet Margulies (1925–2021), who worked for Belisarius Productions as audience liaison since 1990 during production of Quantum Leap, and continued as such for 19 years spanning the entire length of JAG.

=== Commander Peter Ulysses "Sturgis" Turner, USN (JAGC) ===
Played by Scott Lawrence.

A good friend and former Naval Academy classmate of Harm, and a great rival in the courts. He is introduced in Season 7 and at first struggles to adapt to the informal atmosphere of the JAG office. He served on submarines before becoming a lawyer. Son of a Baptist Navy Chaplain. Sturgis and Harm play hoops and fix cars together. Categorically refused to get involved in 'the soap opera' of Harm and Mac's relationship/or lack thereof. Had an on-and-off relationship with Congresswoman Bobbi Latham, and later found love with Varese Chestnut, a jazz singer. Fell into a funk that impaired his relationships with the JAG personnel in Season 8, and his friendship with Harm suffered when he was interim head of JAG after ADM Chegwidden's retirement.

=== Major General Gordon "Biff" Cresswell, USMC (JAGC) ===
Played by David Andrews. Season 10, 17 episodes.

The last JAG in the series, he succeeded RADM A.J. Chegwidden upon his retirement in 2004, and his uncertain confirmation hearings provide dramatic conflict for an episode. He was a very tough leader who also showed a low-key sense of humor and eventually won over the JAG officers. He is among the friends invited by Harm and Mac to their engagement announcement which made up the final scene in the series.

=== Legalman First Class (LN1) Jennifer "Jen" Coates, USN ===
Played by Zoe McLellan. Seasons 7–10, 63 episodes.

A young woman with a conflicted past, Coates came from an unhappy home with a very strict and unforgiving father; it was implied her father was physically abusive to her. Originally a client of Harm's and an electronics technician on the USS Gainesville, she was accused of abandoning her position, for which she was up for court martial. Harm was originally in charge of transporting her to prison, but given that it was the holidays, he arranged for her to spend Christmas Day with the JAG officers, after which Coates decided to "straighten up." She served her time in the brig, then changed her rating to that of a legalman. She is assigned to the USS Seahawk shortly before LT Bud Roberts is assigned to the ship as JAG officer. She was later reassigned to JAG Headquarters, continuing as a legalman and as Admiral Chegwidden's personal assistant. She became a valued member of the team. One of her old "friends" nearly framed her for murder before Harm and the D.C. police proved she was innocent.

When Harm became the foster dad to Mattie Grace, and needed a larger apartment for them to live in, he persuaded Coates to move into the two-bedroom apartment next door so that Mattie could live there with her. (Coates had difficulties with her 4–5 female roommates; Harm inveigled Coates to be Mattie's roommate by paying Mattie's expenses – though his original offer was to pay all costs for both Coates and Mattie.) Harm wanted Coates for Mattie's roommate as he felt that Mattie, being a teenager, would need a female role model.

Coates was promoted to petty officer 1st class in 2004.

The following are the medals and service awards fictionally worn by Petty Officer Coates.

Unit awards
Meritorious Unit Commendation
Service Awards
Navy Good Conduct Medal with one bronze service star
Campaign and service medals
National Defense Service Medal
Global War on Terrorism Expeditionary Medal
Service and training awards
Navy Sea Service Deployment Ribbon

Other accoutrements
Enlisted Surface Warfare Specialist insignia

== Recurring characters ==
=== Commander Caitlin "Kate" Pike, USN (JAGC) ===
Played by Andrea Parker. Seasons 1 & 6, 5 episodes.

A graduate of the United States Naval Academy and Harvard Law School. Commander Pike is Harm's partner in the pilot movie. She was a recurring character in season 1, before disappearing and returning for one episode in season 6.

She and Harm were kind of attracted to each other, and had a "weekend" together, but it fell apart when they realized it was just a thoughtless fling. When she returns in season 6, she's apparently considering a return to the Washington D.C. Naval JAG office which is complicated by a sexual harassment complaint against a high-ranking officer; the officer admitted he had tried to kiss her and apologized for doing so, and she forgave him but felt bad that his career was ruined. At the end of the episode it is revealed that she has rejected an offer to return to the JAG office, and bids goodbye to Harm, while noting his feelings for Mac.

=== Rear Admiral Albert "Al" Brovo, USN (JAGC) ===
Played by Kevin Dunn. Pilot episode.

Admiral Brovo only appeared in the pilot movie. He was the first Judge Advocate General of the Navy in the series, with a weird sense of humor and a talent for playing the clarinet. His jokes often went over the head of his assistant, Commander Theodore Lindsey.

=== Commander Theodore "Teddy" Lindsey, USN (JAGC) ===
Played by W. K. Stratton. Seasons 1, 4, 6–8, 13 episodes.

Lindsey was introduced in the pilot as Admiral Brovo's assistant, a comic relief character who was often the butt of the admiral's jokes. Later he briefly served as acting Judge Advocate General in between ADM Brovo and the arrival of Admiral Chegwidden. He was not kept on the staff at JAG headquarters by ADM Chegwidden and was appointed as an aide to the Secretary of the Navy, Alexander Nelson. He would appear for most of the remaining series as a recurring character. It was later revealed that the Admiral had no confidence in his abilities, and A.J., in fact, made a point of denying Lindsey a promotion at a Season 6 Review Board. Nelson's successor, Senator Edward Sheffield, brought Lindsey into his staff as a senior counselor; this shocked A.J. and Mac in particular because they were surprised that "such a mediocre officer" could attain that level of power. Lindsey was assigned to audit JAG and had unpleasant confrontations with Mac (where he made sexist remarks and she almost hit him) and Harm (who pointed out accurately that Lindsey had a grudge against them in general, and against him in particular).

Lindsey recommended most of the senior staff be reassigned. However, when his dislike for the JAG staff and his own shoddy work were revealed, his report was disregarded by SECNAV as a "hatchet job" and he was forced by SECNAV to resign in disgrace.

Before she was deployed to USS Seahawk (to replace LT Roberts as JAG officer), Lieutenant Loren Singer had engaged in an extramarital affair with Lindsey. Singer attempted to blackmail him when she became pregnant. After receiving $5,000 from Lindsey, she slipped on ice and hit her head on a roadway bridge railing. Lindsey thought about calling for an ambulance but then decided to throw her over the bridge into the river, causing Singer to drown. Lindsey also attempted to frame Harm for the crime. Harm was subsequently charged with murder but was cleared when NCIS Special Agents Anthony DiNozzo and Vivian Blackadder found the real culprit. It was revealed during the interrogation of Lindsey that he was not the father of Singer's baby. Lindsey later pleaded out to involuntary manslaughter and was sentenced to eight years in Fort Leavenworth.

The following are the medals and service awards fictionally worn by Commander Lindsey.

Personal decorations
Width-44 crimson ribbon with two width-8 white stripes at distance 4 from the edges.	Meritorious Service Medal
	Joint Service Commendation Medal
	Navy and Marine Corps Commendation Medal
	Navy and Marine Corps Achievement Medal
Campaign and service medals
	National Defense Service Medal with bronze service star
Service and training awards
	Navy and Marine Corps Overseas Service Ribbon

=== Rear Admiral Thomas "CAG" Boone, USN, Retired ===
Played by Terry O'Quinn. Seasons 1–8, 10 episodes.

Friend and colleague of Harm's father whom Harm saves from court martial several times. Boone was on the mission where Harm's father was shot down. His first appearance on the show was in the pilot as the CAG aboard the USS Seahawk. RADM Thomas Boone had a long and distinguished career in the United States Navy, rising to the rank of rear admiral and was considered for promotion to vice admiral. However, due to allegations of war crimes he committed in Vietnam in 1968, he was subsequently court-martialed. Although he was acquitted of the charges, he requested retirement from the U.S. Navy and was never promoted to VADM. He later returned to active service briefly after 9/11 as an advisor to the Secretary of the Navy during a crisis involving a U.S. plane that had made an emergency landing in China, retiring for the second and final time around Christmas of 2002.

The following are the medals and service awards fictionally worn by Admiral Boone.

Personal decorations
Navy Cross
Silver Star
Distinguished Flying Cross
Navy and Marine Corps Medal
Purple Heart
Meritorious Service Medal with second award star
Air Medal with one silver award star and V Device
Navy and Marine Corps Commendation Medal
Navy and Marine Corps Achievement Medal with second award star
Combat Action Ribbon
Unit awards
Navy Unit Commendation
Meritorious Unit Commendation
Service awards
Navy Expeditionary Medal
Campaign and service medals
National Defense Service Medal with two bronze service stars
Vietnam Service Medal
Southwest Asia Service Medal with bronze service star
Foreign awards
Vietnam Campaign Medal
Kuwait Liberation Medal (Saudi Arabia)

Other accoutrements
Naval Aviator insignia

=== Captain Alison Krennick, USN (JAGC) ===
Played by Andrea Thompson. Seasons 1 & 9, 7 episodes.

Harm's direct superior in the first season and Admiral Chegwidden's second-in-command after his introduction. She only appears in Season 1, yet briefly returns for a cameo in Season 9.

Her first appearance was as the Navy prosecutor in the first court-martial against CAPT Thomas Boone, after he shot down a Serbian Mil Mi-24 Hind without authorization. She came back in the following episode as deputy to the newly appointed JAG, RADM A.J. Chegwidden. Through the end of season 1, she played a seduction game with Harm (a clear violation of military protocols, since she was his direct superior). She returned as a guest star in season 9, as part of a dream sequence, in which an alternate version of Krennick had risen to the rank of Rear Admiral and was now Judge Advocate General of the Navy. During the beginning of season 10, she was mentioned as part of a list of potential replacements for Admiral Chegwidden, but was quickly removed from the selection.

The following are the medals and service awards fictionally worn by Captain Krennick.

Personal decorations
Navy and Marine Corps Achievement Medal
Unit awards
Meritorious Unit Commendation
Campaign and service medals
National Defense Service Medal

=== Alexander Nelson, Secretary of the Navy ===
Played by Paul Collins. Seasons 3–8, 32 episodes.

The first Secretary of the Navy (SECNAV) shown as an onscreen character in the series. From his first appearance and onwards, Nelson often clashed with Rear Admiral A.J. Chegwidden (John M. Jackson) and his senior staff over how to handle politically sensitive issues, where Nelson often favored short-sighted political expediency over "doing what's right".

Following the hearings of the Senate Select Committee on Intelligence, which is brought on by the aftermath of the near-catastrophic Al-Qaeda attack against the USS Seahawk that was ultimately thwarted by the efforts of Harm, Mac, Sturgis, Bud, Singer, and Admiral Chegwidden (at the end of season 7), and for his unusual usage of Navy personnel doing CIA work, Nelson is forced to resign from office and is subsequently replaced by Senator Edward Sheffield (Dean Stockwell), who takes over the duties of Secretary of the Navy in the season 8 episode "Dangerous Game".

=== Yeoman First Class (YN1) Jason Tiner, USN ===
Played by Chuck Carrington. Seasons 2–9, 102 episodes.

Chegwidden's Yeoman, described by Admiral Chegwidden as the best assistant he'd ever had. He has a half-brother, Edward Proxy, a gay man who once accused GySGT Galindez of gay-bashing. Tiner was often part of comic relief in JAG HQ. He left early in season 9 after graduating from law school and being accepted into OCS.

The following are the medals and service awards fictionally worn by Petty Officer Tiner.

Service Awards
Navy Good Conduct Medal
Campaign and service medals
National Defense Service Medal with bronze service star
Foreign awards
Kuwait Liberation Medal (Saudi Arabia)

=== Clayton Webb ===
Played by Steven Culp. Seasons 2–10, 41 Episodes.

A CIA officer, who initially for the duration of the entire 2nd season and part of the third season claimed to be working for the State Department. He also claimed to have served in the Army Adjutant General's Corps during the First Persian Gulf War. He later became a rival and sometimes an ally, achieving the position of Deputy Director Counter Intelligence. Webb was often intimidated by an angry Admiral Chegwidden when his operations got Harm or Mac in a jam. He helped get Harm's brother out of a Chechen prison as a Christmas gift for Harm in Season 8. He and Mac were briefly married for an undercover operation in Paraguay. His real relationship with Mac ended when he faked his own death (not for the first time) and Mac decided she could not deal with the deceptions involved in his work anymore.

=== Congresswoman Roberta "Bobbi" Latham ===
Played by Anne-Marie Johnson. Seasons 3–7, 17 episodes.

The United States Congresswoman from Detroit, Bobbi Latham is the Chairwoman of the House National Security Subcommittee and an avid supporter of women's rights. She is an occasional romantic interest of Harm, and later dated CDR Turner for a while despite a disastrous beginning. She tended to take a hard and often critical line towards the military, especially on cases involving the V-22 Osprey and an ambush in Sierra Leone, but was also shown to be fair-minded.

She is mentioned to have grown up on the "streets of Detroit" and graduated from Yale Law School first in her class.

=== Midshipman Third Class Michael "Mikey" Roberts, USNA ===
Played by Michael Bellisario. Seasons 3–10, 29 episodes.

Throughout Season 3, Mikey is repeatedly pressured to join the Navy by his father. His older brother, Bud, often stands up to their father regarding Mikey's future. Although initially conflicted over his career path, he enlisted and later entered the Naval Academy (Class of 2006). He is charged with dereliction of duty after a CIWS gun malfunction on the USS Wake Island, and Bud leads the review team that clears him of any wrongdoing.

While he loves and respects Bud and Bud genuinely loves him, it takes a long time for Bud to truly treat Mikey with respect. In Season 9, Bud's youngest son runs away while Mikey is watching him, and Bud furiously upbraids Mikey's failings. However, Bud's son is soon found, and he tells Bud he ran away because of Bud and Harriet's fighting; when Bud tries to apologize to Mikey, his brother angrily says, "My name is Mike, not Mikey." He goes on to say that Bud thinks the worst of him and that's Bud's problem, not his, sharply telling his chastened brother, "Don't call me if you need help. Find someone else to yell at."

After Bud spends some time feeling sorry for himself over the estrangement, Harriet gets him to admit his failings to Mike and the brothers reconcile for the rest of the series. He even attends Admiral Chegwidden's dining-out as Bud's guest.

He briefly dated Gunnery Sergeant Galindez's younger sister, Valerie, much to the Gunny's displeasure. By the end of the series, he was dating Cammie, General Gordon Cresswell's daughter. Mike later tells Bud that he is genuinely in love with Cammie and aims to make the relationship permanent.

Bellisario actually appeared in the opening scene of the entire series, playing an Italian boy on a fishing boat in Season 1's pilot episode. He had also played a pizza delivery boy in Season 3's "Ghost Ship" and had a brief recurring role as lab assistant Charles "Chip" Sterling in JAG spin-off NCIS.

=== Lieutenant Commander Michael "Mic" Brumby, CSC, RAN ===
Played by Trevor Goddard. Seasons 4–7, 42 episodes.

A Royal Australian Navy officer who came to JAG in an exchange program. He is a dual citizen of Australia and the United States (as his mother was an American) and holds a law degree from Georgetown University. Mic was frequently called "Bugme" by Harm. In Australia, he and Harm even came to blows over Mac. This is later cleared up by ADM Chegwidden and Brumby's commanding officer in a "non-judicial punishment" after Brumby and Harm break Bud's jaw in two places. Neither Mic nor Harm is allowed to leave the warehouse that the Admiral places them in until they are both in the same amount of pain they inflicted on Bud. Mac and Mic later became engaged and he decided to go into private practice, which made him go against JAG in court. The engagement was broken off and Brumby finally returned to Australia for good when he realized Mac was in love with Harm. He was last seen in Dulles Airport with one last look at Mac as she tried to stop him from leaving. Brumby was later reported to have returned to his naval career. Although their relationship ended, Mic was known to have sent Christmas cards to Mac.

In one scene in the episode "Boomerang (Part II)", he has commander shoulder boards on his uniform, although before and later in the episode, he wears lieutenant commander shoulder boards as usual and no promotion is ever mentioned.

Actor Trevor Goddard was real life friends with Catherine Bell and they had worked together prior to JAG. Goddard also died of a heroin overdose after having left the series, and the premiere of Season 9 paid tribute to him.

The following are the medals and service awards fictionally worn by Lieutenant Commander Brumby:

Conspicuous Service Cross	Australian Active Service Medal with clasps Cambodia and Kuwait	Australian Service Medal with clasps Cambodia and Kuwait
Defence Force Service Medal with Rosette	UNTAC Medal	Kuwait Liberation Medal (Saudi Arabia)

=== Gunnery Sergeant Victor Galindez, USMC ===
"We wanted another character who was not an officer and we also wanted a Hispanic. There are a lot of Hispanics in the Marines and Navy. It was time they were represented."

— Donald P. Bellisario on creating the character.

Played by Randy Vasquez. Seasons 5–9.

A Gunnery Sergeant ("Gunny") who Mac recruited for JAG.

Prior to serving with JAG, he served as an infantry Marine before he decided to leave the military for civilian life. He was then sheriff's deputy in his home state of New Mexico until he was injured and fell into alcohol abuse. His friend Manny saved him and Gunny later reenlisted. Gunny once intervened to separate Manny from another man in a fight and he found himself accused of gay-bashing, but it was later made clear that he did not support Manny's homophobic views. The gay man, Edward Proxy, was the half-brother of PO Tiner, who was a key witness of the defense. He was absolved by a military judge, but an ambitious prosecutor tried him in a civilian court. RADM Chegwidden defended him and he was absolved in that case as well.

Following the events of 9/11, he was moved from JAG Headquarters at his own request to take a more active role in the War on Terror. His next appearance came late in season 7, when Mac, Harm, and Webb again worked with him in the episodes leading up to the attack on the USS Seahawk. He stated that he had been placed with a forward operating unit because they wanted someone with investigative experience to help "hunt down Bin Laden and Company." He fell in love with a woman that his unit had been using as a contact inside local fundamentalist circles, and was devastated when she was killed in a U.S. airstrike. He became a key figure in Harm's rescue of Mac and Webb in Paraguay.

He and Tiner are often put at odds with each other, most notably when both are vying for the attention of ADM Chegwidden, when they, along with Bud, are attempting to get tickets for a Limp Bizkit concert. Gunny wins, having received comp tickets, while Tiner loses to Bud in an online auction (Bud ends up paying $300 for the tickets). Another time was during the JAGathon, when Gunny and Tiner had both placed a "friendly" wager to see who would cross the finish line first; unfortunately, neither one crossed, Tiner breaking two ribs, and Gunny spraining his ankle. However, when push came to shove, they would have each other's backs. When Gunny was ordered to appear in court for several unpaid parking tickets, Tiner defended him, getting him off by having him pay for only the current one.

The following are the medals and service awards fictionally worn by Gunnery Sergeant Galindez.

Personal decorations
Purple Heart
Navy and Marine Corps Achievement Medal
Combat Action Ribbon
Unit awards
Navy Unit Commendation
Service Awards
Marine Corps Good Conduct Medal with four bronze service stars
Marine Corps Expeditionary Medal
Campaign and service medals
National Defense Service Medal with one bronze service star
Armed Forces Expeditionary Medal
Service and training awards
Navy Sea Service Deployment Ribbon with one bronze service star
Foreign awards
Kuwait Liberation Medal (Saudi Arabia)

Other accoutrements
Marine Corps Expert Rifle Badge
Marine Corps Expert Pistol Badge

=== Lieutenant Loren Singer, USN (JAGC) ===
Played by Nanci Chambers. Seasons 5–8, 40 episodes.

An ambitious JAG advocate. Singer was consumed by her continual efforts to further her career at the expense of those around her. She was widely disliked by and often clashed with the other characters; Harm did not trust her, Mac was aghast at having to prosecute a case on which Singer was lead attorney, and Turner said he would never work with her again after she falsely claimed to be Jewish in order to influence a case involving a Marine who converted to Judaism and then went AWOL to serve in the Israeli army after being mistreated by bigoted Corps members. However, she assisted Harm successfully in the trial of Admiral Tom Boone. Especially praised was an episode in which Singer attacked Harriet by using the death of Harriet's baby Sarah to discredit her testimony in court. In a later episode, Harriet got into a violent altercation with Singer and left her with a black eye.

It was strongly implied that Singer had been abused when she was a child. That may be the reason for her only possible recorded moment of compassion. In the episode "Redemption", an abusive father was granted joint custody of his daughter. However the child's mother went missing with her. The father then stormed into JAG saying that his ex-wife had been seen leaving her home in the company of a "blonde female officer." At first it was thought Harriet was the one, but later suspicions fell on Singer. She did not confirm it but did not deny it either, leaving the certainty ambiguous, but even this noble action doesn't help her pariah status at JAG HQ at all (not for the last time, Mac seemed to be looking for an excuse to bring charges against her). Singer is also quite clever. During the Season 7 finale, "Enemy Below", she is the first to deduce the Iranian ruse that allowed Kabir Atef to escape into the Arabian Sea with a diesel submarine.

Singer had affairs with Harm's half-brother Sergei Zhukov, CDR Theodore Lindsey and a third unidentified man who was the father of her baby and probably had some undefined connection to Ireland (she had purchased a ticket to fly there shortly before her death). Harm was convinced Sergei was the father of her baby and lost his cool when Singer told him she planned to abort the child, having a screaming match with her and then forcing her to call Sergei and say (accurately as it turned out) that he was not the father of her child.

Shortly after leaving JAG, Singer was murdered after being thrown into a river which caused her to drown. After a few months trapped in the ice, her badly decayed remains were found in a tree in Potomac Park by a young Boy Scout, prompting the area to be sealed off. The NCIS team led by NCIS Special Agent Leroy Jethro Gibbs was called in to investigate the scene, with suspicion falling on Harm due to circumstantial evidence against him. Harm was cleared by Agent Anthony DiNozzo, and Singer's murderer was revealed to be Lindsey (who was bitter toward the JAG team and, a few months after killing Singer, saw an opportunity to frame Harm). The storyline served as the backdoor pilot for JAG's spin-off series NCIS with the episodes airing during JAG Season 8 under the titles of "Ice Queen" and "Meltdown" respectively.

Chambers is the real-life wife of series star David James Elliott. They were married in 1992 - before JAG started.

The following are the medals and service awards fictionally worn by Lieutenant Singer.

Personal decorations
Navy and Marine Corps Achievement Medal
Campaign and service medals
National Defense Service Medal with bronze service star

=== Sergeant Sergei Zhukov (Russian Army) ===
Played by Jade Carter. Seasons 6–8, 10 episodes.

Harm's Russian half-brother, the son of Harmon Rabb Sr. and a Siberian peasant woman. A Sergeant in the Russian Army, he first met Harm when he was accused of selling weapons to Chechen separatists. Later he fell prisoner in Chechnya but was saved by Clayton Webb, who exchanged two trucks of wheat for him, and brought him to the U.S. on Christmas Eve. His citizenship application was held up because the DNA tests were inconclusive, and he returned to Russia. During his stay in the U.S. he had an affair with LT Loren Singer and was initially under suspicion from Harm when she went missing and her body found in a river. It was then discovered that she was pregnant. He later returned for 48 hours to introduce Harm to his fiancée, Galina Borkova, and said (accurately as it turned out) that he believed Singer's claim that he wasn't her child's father.

=== Professor Meredith Cavanaugh ===
Played by Isabella Hofmann. Seasons 7–9, 18 episodes.

Meredith Cavanaugh was the last romantic interest of Admiral A. J. Chegwidden in the series. They met when she went to JAG headquarters to meet with Col. MacKenzie, but he thought she was another attempt at matchmaking from his subordinates. He later learned that Col. MacKenzie wanted to speak with her about a course she wanted her "little sister" Chloe to attend and he apologized. They bonded over their common interest for Shakespeare. They got engaged, but after Meredith cheated on the admiral, he ended the engagement and her character disappeared from the show.

=== The Honorable Edward Sheffield, Secretary of the Navy ===
Played by Dean Stockwell. Seasons 8–10, 11 episodes.

The second United States Secretary of the Navy in the series, after the resignation his predecessor; Sheffield was formerly a U.S. Senator, as depicted in another of Donald Bellisario's TV series, First Monday. He assigned CDR Lindsey to audit the JAG office due to political pressure. He was forced to study Lindsey's report due to its harshness and told ADM Chegwidden to study the report and defend himself. He finally rejects the accusations, in great part due to the glowing report of LCDR Tracy Manetti, whom he placed undercover to be his eyes and ears in the JAG HQ.

He agreed to go on trial in the Season 9 episode "People v. SECNAV" when a U.S. attack on terrorists in Iraq caused civilian fatalities and led to war crimes charges at The Hague; he was found not guilty of those crimes, but the U.S. was ordered to pay $20 million in compensation for damages.

Dean Stockwell appeared in two of Donald Bellisario's other TV series, First Monday (in which he played the same character as in JAG) and before that in Quantum Leap (as Navy Admiral Al Calavicci). Stockwell appeared also in NCIS: New Orleans in 2014 as Tom Hamilton.

=== Matilda "Mattie" Grace Johnson ===
Played by Hallee Hirsh. Seasons 9–10, 17 episodes.

"Owner" of a crop-dusting business who briefly employed Harm, who was unemployed between his stint with the CIA and his return to JAG. Estranged from her alcoholic father, who was driving the night her mother died in a car accident, Mattie became a foster daughter to Harm until reuniting with her father. She later learned that her father was not drunk during the accident, because he was not arrested afterwards and under Virginia law, he would have been automatically sent to jail if he'd been legally intoxicated. A biplane accident left her possibly paralyzed for life and her father relapsed into alcoholism. In the series finale, she insists that Harm take his assignment in London, as Harm awaits the ruling of the custody hearing. The two insist on sticking together and Harm promises to help her rehabilitate from her injuries.

== Other recurring characters ==
=== At JAG Headquarters ===
==== Rear Admiral Stiles Morris, USN (JAGC) ====
Played by Harrison Page. Seasons 2–9, 22 episodes.

The highest-ranking Judge at JAG Headquarters with over 16 years on the bench as of 1997. Captain Morris presided over the court-martial of a Navy SEAL Chief Petty Officer when Harm, the prosecutor, fired a machine gun into the courtroom ceiling. Morris was promoted to rear admiral (lower half) in Season 3.

RDML Morris is not seen after "Back in the Saddle" (JAG, Season 9, Episode 6).

The following are the medals and service awards fictionally worn by RDML Morris.

Personal decorations
Width-44 crimson ribbon with two width-8 white stripes at distance 4 from the edges.	Meritorious Service Medal
	Joint Service Commendation Medal
	Navy and Marine Corps Commendation Medal with gold award star
	Navy and Marine Corps Achievement Medal
	Combat Action Ribbon
Unit awards
	Navy Unit Commendation
	Meritorious Unit Commendation
Campaign and service medals
	National Defense Service Medal with bronze service star
	Armed Forces Expeditionary Medal
	Vietnam Service Medal
	Southwest Asia Service Medal with bronze service star
Service and training awards
	Navy and Marine Corps Overseas Service Ribbon
Foreign awards
	Vietnam Campaign Medal
	Kuwait Liberation Medal (Saudi Arabia)
	Kuwait Liberation Medal (Kuwait)

==== Commander Carolyn Imes, USN (JAGC) ====
Played by Dana Sparks. Seasons 3–9, 9 episodes.

First appearing in "People v. Rabb", Imes was one of the regular background characters. She was a good lawyer for JAG, but never passed the bar exam, which was discovered in Season 9 and resulted in her court-martial and subsequent dismissal from the Navy.

The following are the medals and service awards fictionally worn by Commander Imes.

Personal decorations
Width-44 crimson ribbon with two width-8 white stripes at distance 4 from the edges.	Meritorious Service Medal
	Navy and Marine Corps Commendation Medal with gold award star
	Navy and Marine Corps Achievement Medal with gold award star
Unit awards
	Meritorious Unit Commendation
Campaign and service medals
	National Defense Service Medal with bronze service star
Service and training awards
	Navy Sea Service Deployment Ribbon

==== Lieutenant Commander Alan Mattoni, USN (JAGC) ====
Played by Rif Hutton. Seasons 3–6, 15 episodes.

A fellow JAG officer who commonly worked as opposing counsel to the main cast. Often appeared as smug and frequently was chaired with LT Singer.

The following are the medals and service awards fictionally worn by Commander Mattoni.

Personal decorations
Navy and Marine Corps Commendation Medal
Navy and Marine Corps Achievement Medal with gold award star
Unit awards
Navy Unit Commendation
Meritorious Unit Commendation
Campaign and service medals
National Defense Service Medal with bronze service star
Service and training awards
Navy and Marine Corps Overseas Service Ribbon

==== Captain Owen Sebring, USN (JAGC) ====
Played by Corbin Bernsen. Seasons 5–9, 8 episodes.

Tough but fair judge who served over the tribunal of an al-Qaeda leader who plotted the 9/11 attacks. Later accused of accidentally killing a young mother's baby during a car crash, but Harm and Mac found out he was innocent and the case was dismissed. Although this was the finding, he retired after the trial.

The following are the medals and service awards fictionally worn by Captain Sebring.

Personal decorations
Navy and Marine Corps Commendation Medal
Navy and Marine Corps Achievement Medal
Unit awards
Navy Unit Commendation
Meritorious Unit Commendation
Campaign and service medals
National Defense Service Medal with bronze service star
Vietnam Service Medal
Foreign awards
Vietnam Campaign Medal

==== Lieutenant Alfred Aldridge, USN (JAGC) ====
Played by A.J. Tannen. Seasons 5–6, 8 episodes.

The JAG Officer attached to the U.S.S. Patrick Henry (CVN-74) during Harm's tour of duty with the VF-218 "Raptors". He later transferred to the staff at JAG Headquarters and was used by Singer as a date.

The following are the medals and service awards fictionally worn by Lieutenant Aldridge.

Unit awards
Meritorious Unit Commendation
Campaign and service medals
National Defense Service Medal
Service and training awards
Navy and Marine Corps Overseas Service Ribbon

Other accoutrements
Surface Warfare insignia

==== Captain Henry Delario (JAGC) ====
Played by Kent McCord. Seasons 3 & 5, 3 episodes.

A rather middle-of-the-road judge, who often heard cases involving the main characters.

==== Commander Amy Helfman, USN (JAGC) ====
Played by Jennifer Savidge. Seasons 6–8, 21 episodes.

Amy Helfman is a member of the JAG corps, assigned to the judiciary (as a judge). She is a fair-minded individual who often winds up listening to Harm's legal arguments on many occasions and tries to make sure that both sides present proper arguments, and is interested in making sure that justice and truth prevail when she presides on the bench.

The following are the medals and service awards fictionally worn by Commander Helfman.

Personal decorations
Navy and Marine Corps Commendation Medal with gold award star
Navy and Marine Corps Achievement Medal
Unit awards
Navy Unit Commendation
Campaign and service medals
National Defense Service Medal with bronze service star
Foreign awards
Kuwait Liberation Medal (Saudi Arabia)

==== Colonel Clifford Blakely, USMC (JAGC) ====
Played by John DeMita. Seasons 6–10, 14 episodes.

Recurring JAG officer assigned to the judiciary.

The following are the medals and service awards fictionally worn by Colonel Blakely.

Personal decorations
Navy and Marine Corps Commendation Medal
Navy and Marine Corps Achievement Medal
Unit awards
Navy Unit Commendation
Meritorious Unit Commendation
Campaign and service medals
National Defense Service Medal with one bronze service star
Southwest Asia Service Medal
Global War on Terrorism Service Medal
Service and training awards
Navy Sea Service Deployment Ribbon
Navy and Marine Corps Overseas Service Ribbon
Foreign awards
Kuwait Liberation Medal (Saudi Arabia)
Kuwait Liberation Medal (Kuwait)

Other accoutrements
Marine Corps Expert Rifle Badge (2nd award)
Marine Corps Expert Pistol Badge (2nd award)

==== Lieutenant Commander Tracy Manetti, USN (JAGC) ====
Played by Tamlyn Tomita. Season 8, 7 episodes.

She was assigned to JAG by request of SecNav Edward Sheffield and she was Harm's partner for seven episodes in season eight. As it turned out, she was Sheffield's eyes and ears in the JAG and her glowing report made him reject CDR Lindsey's accusations against the JAG. She took a class on profiling and was assigned to join Harm on an investigation of murders in Europe that were connected to the Navy. She was reassigned two weeks later. Manetti's Asian/Italian heritage threw Harm at first, believing that she was divorced, however, after working with her in Naples, he comes to find out that Manetti is fluent in Italian, meaning that she was never married. Her past is summed up in her first meeting with Harm that she grew up on a tobacco farm in Virginia, and that her brothers, all lawyers, aren't exactly greeted warmly when they come home, because they are involved in lawsuits against the tobacco companies.

The following are the medals and service awards fictionally worn by Lieutenant Commander Manetti.

Personal decorations
Navy and Marine Corps Commendation Medal
Navy and Marine Corps Achievement Medal with gold award star
Unit awards
Navy Unit Commendation with one service star
Campaign and service medals
National Defense Service Medal with bronze service star
Humanitarian Service Medal
Service and training awards
Navy and Marine Corps Overseas Service Ribbon

==== Captain Richard Carey, USN ====
Played by Richard McGonagle. Season 9, 6 episodes.

Recurring JAG officer assigned to the judiciary.

==== Lieutenant Gregory Vukovic, USN (JAGC) ====
Played by Chris Beetem. Season 10, 8 episodes.

Only appearing in the final season, Vukovic is a JAG officer who is assigned to Cresswell's command and is generally portrayed as an arrogant, smooth-talking youngster. Intelligent and suave, he was constantly trying to impress, often to the annoyance of his contemporaries and superiors. There was a running gag where he would constantly try to seek the attention of Mac, much to hers and Harm's chagrin. Harm and Mac are promoted during the finale, getting assigned to London and San Diego, respectively, and Vukovic is visibly hurt when they both say they don't want him to join their new staff (Mac tells him this directly, while Harm lets it be known to Cresswell, who also finds Vukovic to be a pain in the ass) and that they both prefer Bud. Harm later commented that Vukovic had every potential to make a good JAG officer once he "grew up".

The following are the medals and service awards fictionally worn by Lieutenant Vukovic.

Personal decorations
Navy and Marine Corps Achievement Medal
Unit awards
Meritorious Unit Commendation
Campaign and service medals
National Defense Service Medal
Global War on Terrorism Expeditionary Medal
Service and training awards
Navy Sea Service Deployment Ribbon

Other accoutrements
Surface Warfare insignia

==== Lieutenant Tali Mayfield, USN (JAGC) ====
Played by Meta Golding. Season 10, 3 episodes.

A junior JAG officer assigned to Headquarters and who shares a past with Lt. Vukovic.

The following are the medals and service awards fictionally worn by Lt. Mayfield.

Personal decorations
Navy and Marine Corps Achievement Medal
Unit awards
Meritorious Unit Commendation
Campaign and service medals
National Defense Service Medal
Service and training awards
Navy Sea Service Deployment Ribbon

=== Military personnel ===
==== Captain Ross, USN, Retired ====
Played by Bill Bolender. Seasons 1–4, 5 episodes.

CAPT Ross is the Commanding Officer of USS Seahawk (CVN-65), introduced in the pilot episode. He retired from the Navy in 1997 after 29 years in the service, one year short of his 30 and also despite being considered for promotion to admiral.

==== Admiral Drake, USN ====
Played by John Roselius. Seasons 1–7, 6 episodes.

As a 4-star officer, ADM Drake is the highest-ranking recurring character in the series. He is Chief of Naval Operations, as of season 7. He leads the investigation, as RADM Chegwidden is accused of slapping a loudmouth student at a high school.

==== Lieutenant Elizabeth 'Skates' Hawkes, USN ====
Played by Sibel Galindez. Seasons 2–7, 9 episodes.

F-14 Radar Intercept Officer who flew with Harm on many occasions and had her life saved by Harm in the episode "Crossing the Line". While passing through Washington on her way to the USS Patrick Henry (CVN-74) after completing Landing Signal Officer training, she passed a set of F-14 flight manuals, Weapons Systems Handbook and NATOPS checklist to Harm, thus helping him to shift from the JAG Corps back to naval aviation. She flew with Harm across the episodes "King of the Greenie Board" and "True Callings". In the latter, she experienced panic attacks and Harm helped her get through. In "Mishap", she was brought up on a charge of dereliction of duty and she threatened to resign her commission; however, she was eventually cleared of the charges with Mac prosecuting aggressively. In episode "Adrift II", she helped Harm regain his consciousness by "jumping his bones." She also flew as his RIO when they provided CAP over the Super Bowl during episode "Odd Man Out". That was her last appearance.

The following are the medals and service awards fictionally worn by Lieutenant Hawkes.

Personal decorations
Navy and Marine Corps Commendation Medal
Unit awards
Meritorious Unit Commendation
Campaign and service medals
National Defense Service Medal
Service and training awards
Navy Sea Service Deployment Ribbon

Other accoutrements
Naval Flight Officer insignia

==== Lieutenant Colonel John Farrow, USMC ====
Played by Ben Murphy. Seasons 3–9, 4 episodes.

He was the former CO to Lt.Col. MacKenzie, and revered in the Corps, he defied stupid orders and saved Marines who were being held captive and then being executed by a Haitian warlord. Had a brief affair with Mac, which was revealed in Season 4 episode "People v. Mac". He acknowledged he still held a flame for her, which Mac quickly squashed. However, the two are shown together in the alternative season 9 episode "What If?".

==== Lieutenant Commander Teresa Coulter, M.D. USNR (MC) ====
Played by Trisha Yearwood. Seasons 3–7, 6 episodes.

A Navy Reservist and forensic pathologist who aids JAG on several cases. She developed feelings for Harm which were not returned. She was furious with him when he reopened the case of her mom's death, which had been ruled a homicide by her violent father, Navy Captain Thomas Chaddock, but forgave him when the evidence showed that her mom had committed suicide. In civilian life, Lt. Cmdr. Coulter is a medical examiner in Memphis, Tennessee.

In "In Country", it is revealed that after 9/11 Lt. Cmdr. Coulter was recalled to service and was stationed in Afghanistan, identifying remains for the military.

The following are the medals and service awards fictionally worn by Lieutenant Commander Coulter.

Personal decorations
Navy and Marine Corps Commendation Medal
Navy and Marine Corps Achievement Medal with gold award star
Unit awards
Navy Unit Commendation with one service star
Meritorious Unit Commendation with one service star
Service Awards
Reserve Good Conduct Medal
Campaign and service medals
National Defense Service Medal with bronze service star
Southwest Asia Service Medal
Service and training awards
Navy and Marine Corps Overseas Service Ribbon

==== Commander John Flagler, USN ====
Played by Tom Amandes. Seasons 4, 6–7. 3 episodes.

Captain of the submarine USS Watertown (SSN-696) who reluctantly helps Harm and Mac with investigations involving a boat he commanded. He was instrumental in stopping an Al-Qaeda attack on the USS Seahawk battlegroup (which the Watertown was a part of).

He is a recipient of the Legion of Merit.

==== Captain Tobias Ingles, USN ====
Played by Gary Graham. Seasons 5–7, 5 episodes.

Captain of the USS Patrick Henry. He disliked Harm at first, but grew to respect him.

Gary Graham also played Harm's former mentor, CAPT Hochausen, in the season 3 episode "Blind Side".

The following are the medals and service awards fictionally worn by Captain Ingles during the Hawkes court-martial.

Personal decorations
Air Medal
Navy and Marine Corps Achievement Medal with gold award star
Combat Action Ribbon
Unit awards
Navy Unit Commendation
Service awards
Navy Expeditionary Medal
Campaign and service medals
National Defense Service Medal with bronze service star
Armed Forces Expeditionary Medal
Southwest Asia Service Medal with bronze service star
Foreign awards
Kuwait Liberation Medal (Saudi Arabia)
Kuwait Liberation Medal (Kuwait)

Other accoutrements
Naval Aviator insignia
Command at Sea insignia

==== Captain Johnson, USN ====
Played by Scott Paulin. Season 8, 7 episodes.

Commanding officer of the USS Seahawk. Did not like LT Singer at all and tried to have her charged for conduct unbecoming after finding out she was pregnant. He later planned to resign his commission but was talked out of it by Harm. A hard-driving and fair leader.

==== Commander Beth O'Neil, USN (Later CIA) ====
Played by Mary Page Keller. Season 8–9, 3 episodes.

A former naval aviator accused of sexual harassment, whom Harm and Manetti were assigned to defend in Season 8. Upon her revelation that she is a lesbian, Harm's doubts about her innocence were set aside and she was found innocent of the charges. She later joined the CIA and was Harm's partner during his stint with the agency.

The following are the medals and service awards fictionally worn by Commander O'Neill in "Offensive Action".

Personal decorations
Air Medal
Navy and Marine Corps Commendation Medal with gold award star
Unit awards
Meritorious Unit Commendation
Campaign and service medals
National Defense Service Medal with one service star
Service and training awards
Navy and Marine Corps Overseas Service Ribbon

Other accoutrements
Naval Aviator insignia

==== Lieutenant Catherine Graves, USN ====
Played by Jordana Spiro. Season 10, 3 episodes.

A public affairs officer originally stationed at NAWS China Lake, where she assisted Harm in a JAG investigation. She later worked with Mac, Lt. Vukovic, and Lt. Mayfield in San Diego, and then once again with Lt. Vukovic during his investigation into the death of a Marine during the Vietnam War.

The following are the medals and service awards fictionally worn by Lieutenant Graves.

Personal decorations
Navy and Marine Corps Achievement Medal
Unit awards
Meritorious Unit Commendation
Campaign and service medals
National Defense Service Medal
Service and training awards
Navy and Marine Corps Overseas Service Ribbon

==== Lieutenant Curtis Rivers, USN ====
Played by Montel Williams. Seasons 3–5, 3 episodes.

Lt. Rivers is a Navy SEAL instructor who was awarded the Medal of Honor.

The following are the medals and service awards fictionally worn by Lieutenant Rivers.

Personal decorations
Medal of Honor
Navy Cross with Gold Star
Silver Star with Gold Star
Bronze Star Medal with V device
Navy and Marine Corps Commendation Medal with Gold Star
Navy and Marine Corps Achievement Medal
Combat Action Ribbon
Unit awards
Navy Unit Commendation
Meritorious Unit Commendation
Service Awards
Navy Expeditionary Medal
Campaign and service medals
National Defense Service Medal
Afghanistan Campaign Medal
Kuwait Liberation Medal (Saudi Arabia)
Humanitarian Service Medal
Marksmanship awards
Marksmanship Medal
Marksmanship Medal

Other accoutrements
Special Warfare insignia

=== Family & friends ===
==== Patricia 'Trish' Burnett ====
Played by Christina Pickles. Seasons 3 & 6, 3 episodes.

Harm's mother. Born Patricia Reed, she married Frank Burnett after Harmon Rabb Sr.'s death. She often asked Harm about Mac. She was both saddened and relieved when the full story of Harmon Rabb Sr.'s capture in Vietnam and later, brave death in defense of a Russian family was discovered by her son.

==== Annie Pendry ====
Played by Daphne Ashbrook. Seasons 1–3, 5 episodes.

The wife of Harm's USNA classmate Luke Pendry, a naval aviator flying F-14 Tomcat who perished in a plane crash caused by systems error. She and Harm dated, but after Harm got her son Josh (whom she adamantly did not want to be a naval aviator like her late husband or Harm) onto a tiger cruise aboard an Oliver Hazard Perry-class frigate in the Gulf of Mexico without her permission, that gets hijacked by anti-Castro Cuban terrorists; even after getting Josh back safe and sound, Annie breaks up with Harm because he was dishonest to her.

==== Judge Laura Delaney ====
Played by Meg Wittner. Season 2, episode 7.

Judge Delaney was a love interest of ADM Chegwidden, and was often seen at his home. She was killed by a mine meant for the Admiral, causing him to hunt down the person responsible. Judge Delaney was in the process of divorcing her husband when she and the Admiral started their love affair.

==== Francesca Paretti ====
Played by Giuliana Santini. Season 3–4, 5 episodes.

A.J. Chegwidden's daughter. She spent time in Italy as a fashion writer, but had run-ins with the JAG crew on occasion. Showed apparent interest in Harm but he always changed the subject (due to her relation to the Admiral and his "thing" with Mac).

==== Master Chief Petty Officer 'Big Bud' Roberts Sr., USN ====
Played by Jeff MacKay. Seasons 3–10, 10 episodes.

Though he genuinely loves his sons, Bud Jr., and Mikey, he has a strained relationship with them due to his having been sometimes abusive toward them when they were children, perhaps on account of the stress of having to raise them by himself after their mother's death. He lives alone in a trailer park and is not above the occasional money-making scheme, getting into trouble in one episode and having to be defended in court by Bud Jr. He came out of retirement when the Navy began recalling retired petty officers to active duty to deal with a personnel shortage. After trying to weasel his way out of service, Big Bud pleasantly surprises Bud by agreeing to an assignment in Georgia to help train naval supply personnel for the war in Iraq. He helps Harm or Bud Jr., on cases on at least two occasions, most notably when Mikey is charged with murder in Mexico. Big Bud helps by pretending to be shot by a "robber" (the robber being Gunny Galindez) so Harm can get information out of a witness.

The following are the medals and service awards fictionally worn by Master Chief Roberts at his court-martial in "The Adversaries".

Personal decorations
Navy and Marine Corps Commendation Medal
Navy and Marine Corps Achievement Medal
Unit awards
Navy Unit Commendation
Meritorious Unit Commendation
Navy "E" Ribbon
Service awards
Navy Good Conduct Medal with one silver service star
Campaign and service medals
National Defense Service Medal with bronze service star
Service and training awards
Navy Sea Service Deployment Ribbon with one silver service star
Foreign awards
Vietnam Campaign Medal

Other accoutrements
Enlisted Surface Warfare Specialist insignia
7 Service Stripes (reflecting 28 years of service)

==== Chloe Madison ====
Played by Mae Whitman. Seasons 4–7, 8 episodes.

Mac's "little sister". She was reunited with her real father thanks to Mac and the JAG staff.

==== Lieutenant Commander Jordan Parker, M.D. USN (MC) ====
Played by Susan Haskell. Seasons 4–6, 8 episodes.

Jordan dated Harm for a year. She cornered Mac in MacMurphy's at a JAG wetdown and told her of her worries about her impact on their relationship. Broke up with Harm over his return to flying. Later killed in Season 6, leaving Harm, Mac, and LCDR Coulter to find the killer, who turned out to be the disturbed wife of a Marine.

The following are the medals and service awards fictionally worn by Commander Parker in "Goodbyes".

Personal decorations
Navy and Marine Corps Achievement Medal
Unit awards
Navy Unit Commendation
Navy Meritorious Unit Commendation
Campaign and service medals
National Defense Service Medal

==== A.J. Roberts ====
Played by Jake Milkovich. Seasons 5–7, 10 episodes.

Also known as "Baby A.J." by the JAG staff, A.J. is the son of Harriet and Bud Roberts. Named after A.J. Chegwidden, who delivered the baby in his office. Unknown to Admiral Chegwidden, "Baby A.J." is just A.J. rather than Albert Jethro; Bud and Harriet want to honor the admiral with their name choice but balk at what "A.J." spells out.

==== Dr. Sydney Walden, M.D. ====
Played by Cynthia Sikes. Seasons 5–6, 8 episodes.

Love interest of ADM A.J. Chegwidden. She had a grown-up son, Danny Walden. But she later broke up with Chegwidden following Danny's illicit use of the Admiral's car, because she never believed that her son did anything wrong despite Chegwidden's claims.

==== Daniel 'Danny' Walden ====
Played by Sean Murray (actor). Seasons 4–6, 6 episodes.

The teenage son of Dr. Sydney Walden, RADM A.J. Chegwidden's girlfriend, Danny was rebellious, often going to great lengths to end his mother's relationship with Admiral Chegwidden while his mother remained oblivious. Danny later joined the Navy at A.J.'s insistence, instead of receiving probation for his many misdeeds.

Murray, who played Walden, later appeared in the JAG spin-off series, NCIS, as NCIS Special Agent Timothy McGee, making his debut appearance in the Season 1 episode, "Sub Rosa", where McGee was an agent assigned to the Norfolk Naval Base.

From Season 2 onwards, McGee was reassigned to the Navy Yard in Washington D.C., joining the team led by NCIS Special Agent Leroy Jethro Gibbs, with Murray later being promoted to a series regular and also being added to the NCIS opening credits.

==== Rene Peterson ====
Played by Cindy Ambuehl. Seasons 5–8, 24 episodes.

A director of videos and documentaries who met Harm while filming a Navy recruitment commercial. She grew jealous of Harm and Mac's friendship (maybe more) and called Harm on it. She grew frustrated by his lack of answers; Harm's refusal to commit seriously to her and the return of Rene's great love of her life spelled the peaceful end of their time together. She later sent Harm a postcard revealing she was pregnant with twins (in real life, Cindy Ambuehl also gave birth to twins).

==== Captain Matthew Turner, USN, Retired (Chaplain Corps) ====
Played by Bill Cobbs. 4 episodes.

The father of Commander Sturgis Turner. A Navy Chaplain who served in World War II. Below are the list of medals and service awards fictionally worn by Captain Turner in "Answered Prayers".

Personal decorations
Navy and Marine Corps Commendation Medal
Navy and Marine Corps Achievement Medal with gold award star
Unit awards
Navy Unit Commendation
Meritorious Unit Commendation
Campaign and service medals
National Defense Service Medal with one service star
Korean Service Medal
Vietnam Service Medal
Service and training awards
Navy Sea Service Deployment Ribbon
Navy and Marine Corps Overseas Service Ribbon

==== Midshipman 4th Class Cameron 'Cammie' Cresswell, USNA ====
Played by Danneel Harris. Season 10, 2 episodes.

Daughter of Maj. Gen. Gordon Cresswell. She had a flirtatious relationship with fellow USNA cadet Mike Roberts, brother of her father's subordinate Bud Roberts.

==== Dora Cresswell ====
Played by Mel Harris. Season 10, 2 episodes.

The wife of General Cresswell.

=== Other ===
==== Chuck DePalma (Aerobureau/ZNN reporter) ====
Played by Cliff DeYoung. Seasons 1–4, 4 episodes.

Reporter for Aerobureau (later ZNN) who formerly served in the special forces, now reporting on stories involving the military. Reports on stories the main cast are involved in, sometimes helping them with information he gathered as part of his job.

==== Mrs. Porter Webb (National Security Agency, retired) ====
Played by Claudette Nevins. Seasons 2–10, 7 episodes.

Mother of CIA Agent Clayton Webb. Saved Mac's life in Season 10 episode "Hail and Farewell Part II".

==== Mark Falcon (aka Major Sokol) (Russian FSB/SVR) ====
Played by Rex Linn. Seasons 3–6, 8 episodes.

Russian KGB agent who had a thing for Mac. He was raised in Houston where his parents spied on NASA for the USSR. He helped Harm find his father.

==== Special Agent Clark Palmer ====
Played by Peter Murnik. Seasons 3–6, 7 episodes.

A former member of a shadowy D.O.D. group named D.S.D. (Defense Security Division), who became a rogue operative and Harm's bête noire, trying to kill him on numerous occasions. His last attempt to do so tacked on a huge amount of jail time to his already impressive sentence and he wasn't seen again on the series after that.

==== Dalton Lowne, Attorney at Law ====
Played by Larry Poindexter. Season 3, 7 episodes.

Mac's boyfriend, who convinced her to quit JAG and join his law firm. Mac ended both their professional and personal relationships when he used information from her files during a military case. Harm often referred to him as "Lowne as in Clown." He was later shot and killed when it was thought he was stalking Mac, though it was revealed that an obsessive police officer had framed him as a stalker and then murdered him.

==== Stuart Dunston (ZNN Reporter) ====
Played by John D'Aquino. Season 6–10, 11 episodes.

A war reporter whose tendency to get into the heart of the action often got him in trouble. He both helped and hindered the main cast in various episodes, most notably when he kept ADM Chegwidden from being courtmartialed with some info he was able to dig up. However, he also found himself often the brunt of a JAG investigation, example: During a mission, in which he was brought along as an observer, he inadvertently caused the SEAL team he was with to walk into an ambush that was set up by his aide back in Washington. Dunston later changed his plea from not guilty, to guilty, when he found out what actually happened. He would then make a formal apology to every member of the SEAL team, and made a public apology to the world. He also reports on Bud's injury even before Bud's wife, Harriet, is informed of the full details, causing ADM Chegwidden to slightly lose his cool.

==== Allen Blaisdell ====
Played by Dan Lauria. Season 9, 4 episodes.

Harm's direct supervisor while he was attached to the CIA, an easy-going guy who once flew for Air America during the 1960s and '70s, and seems to find working for the CIA well suited to his background. He very reluctantly fired Harm from the CIA after Harm was filmed by a TV crew (unbeknownst to him), which was against CIA regulations.

Dan Lauria also appeared as Marine Colonel Matt 'Gooch' Anderson in the Season 1 episode "Survivors".

==== Harrison Kershaw, Deputy Director of the Central Intelligence Agency ====
Played by Jameson Parker. Seasons 8–9, 4 episodes.

Hired Harm to work as a CIA pilot in Season 9 when Harm's Navy career was (at the time) absolutely over and done with.

==== Catherine Gale, Esq ====
Played by Laura Putney Season 8–9, 5 episodes.

A lawyer employed by the CIA, who first crossed paths with the JAG team as opposing counsel in court of inquiry over a 1968 case involving a lost submarine. Later told Harm where Mac was in Paraguay, in exchange for a fake wedding with Harm for her dying mother (who miraculously recovered later).

== See also ==
- Characters of NCIS
