= Duane Henry =

English actor

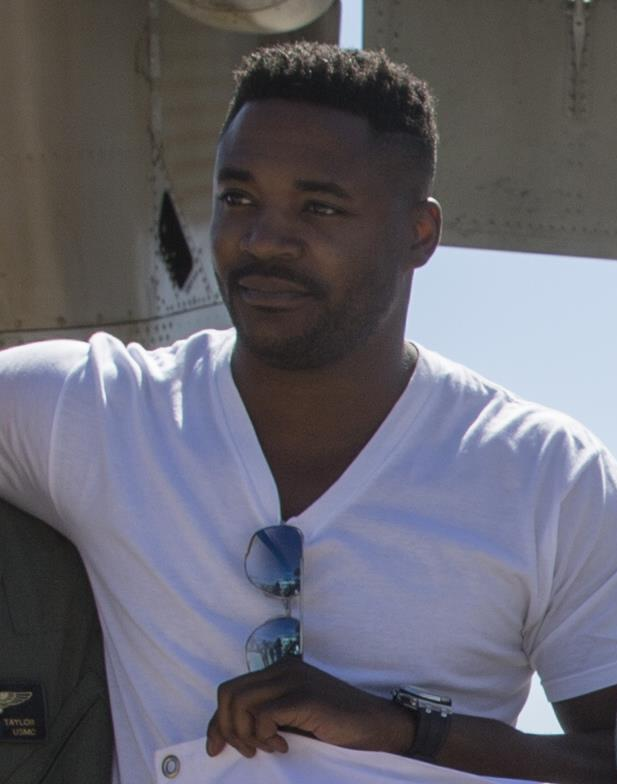
- Henry, during an NCIS USO tour at Marine Corps Air Station Miramar, 2017
- Born: 18 March 1985 (age 41); Birmingham, West Midlands, England
- Occupation: Actor
- Years active: 2004–present
- Known for: Clayton Reeves (NCIS)

Duane Henry (born 18 March 1985) is an English actor. Henry is most notable for his roles as Clayton Reeves in NCIS and Gareth Broadhurst in Doctors. He currently resides in Los Angeles, California.

== Early life ==
Duane Henry was born in Birmingham, West Midlands, England. He grew up in a working class home in Handsworth. As a child, Henry attended St. Francis Catholic Primary School in Birmingham, and St. John Wall School in Handsworth, eventually studying drama at Dudley College. When he was 17, Henry moved to London to explore a career in the entertainment industry.

== Career ==
Henry first began acting in 2004, a year after moving to London on November 27, 2003. His first acting role was alongside Samantha Janus on The Afternoon Play, a British television anthology series. From 2004 to 2011, Henry made a variety of guest appearances on popular British television dramas, including Doctor Who, The Bill, and The Cut, earning him a nomination for the British Academy of Film and Television Arts (BAFTA) Screen National Award for Best Emerging Talent in 2010.

From 2005 to 2013, Henry played five roles on the British medical soap opera Doctors, originally set in Birmingham. He played Gareth Broadhurst, a former soldier with PTSD in a three-part special of the show released in 2013 entitled Doctors: War Zone. Henry attributes his success on Doctors to the fact that he is a native of Birmingham and is therefore automatically considered for roles on the show. Then, in 2011, Henry played a security guard in Madonna’s historical romance drama W.E.

Henry moved from London to Los Angeles in November 2013. Shortly after moving to Los Angeles, Henry spent a year perfecting his American accent in order to expand his range as an actor. He auditioned for many roles, including a role on Jennifer Lopez's Shades of Blue, where film director Barry Levinson 'was also present.

Henry first joined the NCIS cast as MI6 agent Clayton Reeves in May 2016 for the 23rd and 24th episodes of the show’s 13th season. Henry was given an option to return for the following season. In July 2016, it was confirmed that Henry’s character would be featured as a regular on the show beginning in the 14th season, which aired on September 20, 2016. According to Henry, the character of Clayton Reeves did not originally have roots in Birmingham, but he incorporated his upbringing into his character’s backstory. Henry left NCIS in the 22nd episode of the 15th season titled "Two Steps Back" in which Reeves is killed off. Henry explained that neither he nor the producers were sure how to develop the character after the death of his creator and NCIS showrunner Gary Glasberg on September 28, 2016, so the decision was made to write the character out of the show at the end of season 15.

== Personal life ==
Henry was homeless for a period in his lifetime, and has connected his difficult upbringing in Birmingham to his success as an actor. His mother was a 16 year-old single parent. He eventually moved in with his aunt and held various jobs including selling shoes on Oxford Street, and in a theatre in Leicester Square, where he "was sacked for daydreaming and practising his autograph." Henry did not know his father. He stated that growing up they were hit with reality, and where he grew up showed him where he does and does not want to be in life; it made him work much harder to achieve his goals.

Henry has stated that if he were not an actor, he would still be involved in the arts, perhaps teaching drama to younger generations, or as a talent scout. When asked about his inspiration as an actor, Henry replied that he reviews the struggles of people in his social circles “from A-Z” and then sees them still on their feet and smiling and draws inspiration from them to “keep on going”.

== Filmography ==
=== Film ===
Year	Title	Role	Notes	Ref.
2006	The Road to Guantánamo	Guard #1		
2008	The Oxford Murders	Policeman 1		
2008	Flick	Mark Jackson		
2011	London Boulevard	Nation of Islam Guy	Uncredited role	
2011	Ghosted	Jason		
2011	W.E.	Dwayne / Security Guard		
2012	The Dark Knight Rises	SWAT in Dive Bar		
2012	Comedown	Colin "Col"		
2012	A Scholarship	Michael	Short film	
2012	12	James	Short film	
2012	Blasted	Vernon	Short film	
2014	Montana	Junior		
2016	Oysters Have Feelings Too	Daniel	Short animated film	
2019	Captain Marvel	Talos-Kree soldier		

=== Television ===
Year	Title	Role	Notes	Ref.
2005	The Afternoon Play	Ryan	Episode: "The Hitch"	
2005	Doctors	Alex	Episode: "Sleepless Nights"	
2005	7/7: Attack on London	Jermaine Lindsey	Television film	
2005-09	Dubplate Drama	DJ Drama		
2006	Jericho	Roy Marlowe	Episode: "The First Seventeen Hours"	
2006	Dream Team 80's	Kevin Nelson	Mini-series	
2007	Desperados	Jake Malone	3 episodes	
2007	Nearly Famous	Lee	Mini-series	
2007	Blue Murder	Aaron Mathews	Episode: "Desperate Measures"	
2008	West 10 LDN	Orin	Television film	
2008	Doctors	Jack Shaw	Episode: "And the Winner Is..."	
2008	Doctor Who	Mechanic Claude	Episode: "Midnight"	
2008	Bonekickers	Anthony	Episode: "Warriors"	
2008	Coming Up	Totes	Episode: "Kings of London"	
2009	The Philanthropist	Officer Bradley	Episode: "San Diego"	
2009	The Bill	Tyson Archer	Episodes: "Trust Me" and "Backlash"	
2009	Doctors	Tony Filton	Episode: "Love All"	
2010	The Cut	Rory Andrews	Recurring; 12 episodes	
2011	Law & Order: UK	Marty Flynn	Episode: "Denial"	
2011	Doctors	Steve Day	Episode: "Glad Rags"	
2012	Casualty	Tommy Downs	Episode: "When the Gloves Come Off"	
2013	Doctors	Gareth Broadhurst	3 episodes	
2015	Paradise Pictures	Aldo Boyd	Unsold pilot for USA Network	
2016	Cruel Intentions	Sullivan	Unsold pilot for NBC	
2016–18	NCIS	Clayton Reeves	Main: seasons 14–15; guest: season 13	
2018	A Gingerbread Romance	Adam	Hallmark movie	
2021	Mistletoe in Montana	Mark Aguilar	Lifetime movie	
