= JAG season 6 =

JAG
- Season 6
- Starring: David James Elliott; Catherine Bell; Patrick Labyorteaux; John M. Jackson; Karri Turner; Trevor Goddard; Chuck Carrington; Randy Vasquez
- No. of episodes: 24

Release
- Original network: CBS
- Original release: October 3, 2000 – May 22, 2001

Season chronology
- ← Previous; Season 5 Next → Season 7

The sixth season of JAG was premiered on CBS on October 3, 2000, and was concluded on May 22, 2001. The season, starring David James Elliott and Catherine Bell, was produced by Belisarius Productions in association with Paramount Television.

== Plot ==
Lieutenant Colonel Sarah "Mac" MacKenzie (Catherine Bell) and Commander Harmon "Harm" Rabb, Jr. (David James Elliott) are lawyers assigned to the headquarters of the Judge Advocate General, an office in the Department of the Navy, tasked with prosecuting and defending criminal cases under the Uniform Code of Military Justice (UCMJ). Harm and Mac investigate numerous occurrences including espionage ("Legacy"), stowaways ("Florida Straits"), aircraft malfunctions ("Flight Risk"), breaches of religious law ("The Princess and the Petty Officer"), war crimes from the Vietnam War ("A Separate Peace"), and NATO collisions ("Collision Course"). Further in this season, Bud (Patrick Labyorteaux) blames a Navy doctor for the death of his daughter ("Family Secrets"), Commander Caitlin Pike (Andrea Parker) returns to JAG HQ ("Touch and Go"), Admiral Chegwidden (John M. Jackson) heads a promotion board ("Baby, It's Cold Outside"), and Mic (Trevor Goddard) and Mac become engaged ("Lifeline"). Also, Harm becomes lost at sea ("Adrift"), Harriet is promoted to Lieutenant ("Lifeline"), and Mac prepares to give a historical lecture at the United States Naval Academy ("Mutiny").

== Production ==
The real Judge Advocate General of the Navy at the time, rear admiral Donald J. Guter, visited the set during the production of episode eighteen, titled "Liberty".

Also in this season, JAG filmed scenes at the Marine training facility Camp Pendleton, as "under an agreement with the Marine Corps, the show's producers get access to troops, combat equipment and military training in exchange for the service's approval of the scripts". Donald P. Bellisario credits the military as being particularly supportive, while series star Catherine Bell opined that JAG had become "the little show that could. It keeps going and growing".

== Cast and characters ==
=== Main ===
- David James Elliott as Harmon Rabb, Jr., Commander
- Catherine Bell as Sarah MacKenzie, Lieutenant Colonel, USMC
- Patrick Labyorteaux as Bud Roberts, Lieutenant
- John M. Jackson as A. J. Chegwidden, Rear Admiral

=== Also starring ===
- Karri Turner as Harriet Sims, Lieutenant
- Trevor Goddard as Mic Brumby, Lieutenant Commander, RAN
- Randy Vasquez as Gunnery Sergeant Victor Galindez, USMC
- Chuck Carrington as Petty Officer Jason Tiner, USN

=== Recurring ===
- Terry O'Quinn as Thomas Boone, Rear Admiral, "CAG"
- Paul Collins as Alexander Nelson, Secretary of the Navy
- Sibel Galindez as Elizabeth Hawkes, "Skates", Lieutenant
- Steven Culp as Clayton Webb, CIA Agent
- Nanci Chambers as Loren Singer, Lieutenant
- Harrison Page as Stiles Morris, Rear Admiral
- Claudette Nevins as Porter Webb, NSA Agent
- Michael Bellisario as Michael Roberts, Midshipman
- Anne-Marie Johnson as Roberta Latham, Congresswoman
- Dana Sparks as Carolyn Imes, Commander
- Rex Linn as Mark Falcon, KGB Agent
- Mae Whitman as Chloe Maddison
- Jennifer Savidge as Amy Helfman, Commander
- Cindy Ambuehl as Rene Peterson, television producer

=== Guest appearances ===
- Andrea Parker as Caitlin Pike, Commander
- Susan Haskell as Jordan Parker, Lieutenant Commander

== Episodes ==
No. overall	No. in season	Title	Directed by	Written by	Original release date	Prod. code	US viewers (millions)
111	1	"Legacy"	Terrence O'Hara	Ed Zuckerman & Paul Levine	October 3, 2000	111	13.46
112	2	"Legacy"	Terrence O'Hara	Ed Zuckerman & Paul Levine	October 10, 2000	112	14.07
Harm goes to Russia to assist in modernizing the Russian military justice system, while Mac and Bud prosecute a Navy Commander with selling secrets to the Russians before he is killed by a car bomb outside JAG HQ along with two Marine guards. While there Harm meets a young Russian pilot named Sergei and is shocked to learn his connection with the young pilot. He is Harm's half-brother. Born to the Rabb Sr. and the village woman Harm had met who'd his father died saving. Harm's half-brother Sergei is accused of a capital crime, while Mac rushes to the scene to prevent an assassination of Russian President Vladimir Putin. Meanwhile Harm desperately tries to saves Sergei from the corrupt Russian military officers who want to make Sergei the scapegoat to their crimes.
113	3	"Florida Straits"	Alan J. Levi	Dana Coen	October 17, 2000	113	13.64
A Cuban girl is rescued off the Florida coast by a US Navy frigate, setting off a dispute between the Captain of the frigate (Nestor Serrano) and higher command authorities whether the child should be returned to Cuba or be treated as a refugee.
114	4	"Flight Risk"	Bradford May	Jonathan Robert Kaplan	October 24, 2000	114	12.37
The crash of a newly modified F-14 Tomcat that kills two aviators leads Harm to investigate the civilian contractor in charge of the project.
115	5	"JAG TV"	Scott Brazil	Patrick Labyorteaux	October 31, 2000	115	13.82
Mac is thrown into a vexing situation when her prosecution of a Navy Ensign accused of murder is chosen to be the first televised court-martial, while Harm investigates a sailor on the USS Seahawk who apparently committed suicide by jumping in front of an F-14 during recovery operations. Mary Hart, Gloria Allred and Johnnie Cochran appear as themselves.
116	6	"The Princess and the Petty Officer"	Alan J. Levi	Mark Saraceni	November 14, 2000	118	13.04
Mac takes her expertise to a Sharia Tribunal, an Islamic court, to defend an Arab princess (Kamala Lopez) who eloped with a Navy Petty Officer (Bailey Chase) while Harm defends the princess' husband who smuggled her into the U.S. which throws up a host of problems both personal and political. Meanwhile; Bud and Harriet go in for an eight month ultrasound but there are unexpected complications when Harriet goes into labor. Rudy Boesch from Survivor appears as himself.
117	7	"A Separate Peace"	Jeannot Szwarc	Stephen Zito	November 21, 2000	116	12.90
118	8	"A Separate Peace"	Terrence O'Hara	Stephen Zito	November 28, 2000	117	13.47
When Rear Admiral Thomas Boone (Terry O'Quinn) is about to be nominated as commander of the Sixth Fleet and promoted to vice admiral, a letter to the SECNAV accusing him of war crimes committed during the Vietnam War might derail his promotion, if not worse. Harm and Mac have just four days to discover the truth. Harm acts as defense counsel for Boone at his court-martial. Mac acts as the trial counsel.
119	9	"Family Secrets"	Bradford May	Paul Levine	December 12, 2000	119	13.53
Bud's obsession with blaming the doctor for the death of his second child, Sarah, endangers his career and marriage. Harm receives news from Webb that his half-brother Sergei was shot down over Chechnya and taken as prisoner of war. Harm has to reveal Sergei's existence to his mother when Webb has the news run an article about Sergei's paternity, to make sure his captors don't mistreat him.
120	10	"Touch and Go"	James Whitmore Jr.	Dana Coen	January 9, 2001	120	15.26
Harm's former partner, Commander Caitlin "Kate" Pike (Andrea Parker), is offered a post at JAG HQ, but rumors in the media that she was sexually harassed by her former CO who is in line to become Naval Inspector General may keep her from taking the job. Bud helps a woman Marine corporal (Jolene Blalock) who wants to become a commissioned officer, but a tattoo gets in the way.
121	11	"Baby, It's Cold Outside"	Hugo Cortina	Stephen Zito	January 16, 2001	121	15.24
Harm takes up the defense of a former Marine drill instructor who is facing a life sentence under a "three strikes" law, while Admiral Chegwidden is asked to chair the Promotion Board for Captain and Mac is named Acting JAG.
122	12	"Collision Course"	Greg Beeman	Jonathan Robert Kaplan	January 30, 2001	123	16.29
When US and Turkish vessels collide during a NATO exercise, Harm and Mac must defend the US commander while political pressure mounts to pin the accident on him. Mikey and Gunny's sister hit it off while she's visiting DC.
123	13	"Miracles"	Mark Horowitz	Ed Zuckerman	February 6, 2001	122	15.39
Harm must defend Marine Sergeant Major Krohn (Gerald McRaney) accused of killing his wife. The Krohn says he was led to her body by the ghost of his Vietnam War unit's chaplain, which draws attention from the Vatican because the chaplain in question is up for sainthood.
124	14	"Killer Instinct"	Jerry London	Mark Saraceni	February 13, 2001	124	15.16
An apparent suicide may be anything but as Harm and Bud look into the inept young sailor's life. Mac defends a Marine who is a bigamist.
125	15	"Iron Coffin"	Scott Brazil	Paul Levine	February 20, 2001	125	15.63
Harm is asked to convince a Russian sub captain that a Russian submarine was not sunk by an American sub, but by a design flaw in their VA-111 Shkval torpedo. However, that specific piece of information cannot be relayed because it was collected through sensitive means. Mac is asked to observe a Congressional investigation into why women aren't allowed to serve on submarines. (Note: The Ehime Maru and USS Greeneville collision that occurred 11 days earlier is mentioned in this episode.)
126	16	"Retreat, Hell"	Jeannot Szwarc	Stephen Zito	February 27, 2001	126	15.94
Gunny's life is threatened when he is asked to transport an old hispanic Marine accused of desertion who served at the Battle of Chosin Reservoir back to Washington, D.C. for court-martial. The Admiral goes on vacation fishing with Gunny's sister as his guide, and Harm is named acting JAG. After falling off the Admiral's chair and hitting his head, Harm begins seeing romantic hallucinations of Mac. Meanwhile, Mic returns, but his plan to be the lawyer for people suing the Navy annoys Harm. The episode is followed by a message that reads: During the Chosin Reservoir Campaign, the First Marine Division, under the command of General Oliver P. Smith, fought against overwhelming odds. Only the courage and determination of the Marines in the face of bitter cold and savage hand-to-hand fighting prevented their annihilation. It was one of the Marine Corps' finest hours.
127	17	"Valor"	Terrence O'Hara	Douglas Stark	March 13, 2001	127	13.39
After an attempted terrorist attack against a Navy destroyer fails, following the USS Cole bombing, Harm and Mac must determine whether a female Marine found aboard the terrorist's boat assisted the terrorists or not.
128	18	"Liberty"	Jeannot Szwarc	Larry Moskowitz	March 27, 2001	128	14.08
Bud's brother Mikey Roberts is accused of killing a man in a barroom brawl while on liberty in Mexico, and Bud must work with his father to clear his name. Mac has to deal with a Marine bulldog mascot with a tendency to escape from his base and impregnate local female dogs. (Note: This episode features a credited cameo appearance of the then real-life Judge Advocate General of the Navy, Rear Admiral Don Guter.)
129	19	"Salvation"	Bradford May	Ed Zuckerman	April 10, 2001	129	11.99
Sergeant Major Krohn (Gerald McRaney) needs Harm's help again when a murder weapon, with his fingerprints on it, shows up at JAG HQ. But a plan by an old adversary of Harm's puts everyone in danger. Bud is assigned to carry the nuclear football for a short period of time.
130	20	"To Walk on Wings"	Michael Schultz	Story by : Paul Levine and Jonathan Robert Kaplan; Teleplay by : Paul Levine	April 24, 2001	130	12.08
When a Marine Corps V-22 Osprey with a Congressional delegation aboard nearly crashes, Harm and Mac must determine who or what is responsible. Harriet learns about a secret love affair between a Marine and his friend's wife.
131	21	"Past Tense"	Bradford May	Dana Coen	May 1, 2001	132	11.26
LCdr. Jordan Parker (Susan Haskell) is found dead in her base residence, and Harm is convinced that she was the victim of foul play. RAdm. Chegwidden arranges for his ex-girlfriend's son to enlist in the Navy instead of going to prison.
132	22	"Lifeline"	David James Elliott	Larry Moskowitz	May 8, 2001	131	12.33
During Mac's engagement party to Mic Brumby, she and Harm find themselves alone, reminiscing about the unique relationship they have had since they first met. As the party continues inside at the Admiral's home, Harm and Mac escape to the porch to recall the times they've shared: the fun and the high adventure as well as the personal times when they bared their souls to each other. And while their respective mates wait for them inside, Mac and Harm steal an intimate moment that leaves Mac wondering which relationship is more important to her. Harriet is promoted to the grade of lieutenant. (Note: David James Elliott directed this episode of JAG; his first time behind the camera.)
133	23	"Mutiny"	Mark Horowitz	Ed Zuckerman & Nelson Costello	May 15, 2001	133	11.31
Cold opening message: The following story is based on an actual event in U.S. Naval History. As Mac prepares to give a lecture on attempted mutiny aboard the USS Somers in 1842 at the United States Naval Academy, she finds herself daydreaming about the events imagining her co-workers in the roles of those aboard the ship. Through Mac's daydreams, the story unfolds about the events leading up to the hanging of three supposed mutineers by the ship's captain, Commander MacKenzie. Though cleared by a panel of inquiry, MacKenzie is charged with murder and court-martialed at the insistence of the Secretary of War, whose son supposedly organized the mutiny, and subsequently, was one of the three men hanged aboard the Somers.
134	24	"Adrift, Part I"	Scott Brazil	Stephen Zito & Dana Coen	May 22, 2001	134	15.14
Mac and Mic's wedding plans are disrupted when Harm's and Skates' F-14 Tomcat goes down during an intense storm and he is lost at sea.

== See also ==
- 2000–01 United States network television schedule
