= A Man Walks Into a Bar... (NCIS) =

- NCIS episode
- Episode no.: Season 8 Episode 14
- Directed by: James Whitmore, Jr.
- Written by: Gary Glasberg
- Original air date: February 8, 2011

Guest appearances
- Wendy Makkena as Dr. Rachel Cranston; Scott Lawrence as Navy Captain Thomas Lind; Kim Johnston Ulrich as Nancy Hargrove; Matthew Yang King (as Matt Yang King) as Min Ho Kwon; Robert Newman as Navy Admiral Wayne Hargrove; Alexandra Barreto as Navy Petty Officer Rena Oliver; Brian Skala as Navy Ensign David Howard; Dustin Seavey as Navy Seaman Marcus Leonard

Episode chronology
← Previous "Freedom"	Next → "Defiance"
- NCIS season 8

"A Man Walks Into a Bar..." is the 14th episode in the eighth season, and the 176th overall episode, of the American crime drama television series NCIS. It first aired on CBS in the United States on February 8, 2011. The episode is written by Gary Glasberg and directed by James Whitmore, Jr., and was seen by 20.35 million viewers.

In the episode, a naval commander is found dead in his rack aboard ship, apparently murdered. The NCIS team investigates while having to deal with mandatory psychological evaluations conducted by Dr. Rachel Cranston, who is eventually revealed to be the elder sister of their late colleague and friend, Agent Caitlin Todd.

The title refers to the first line of the "bar joke".

== Plot ==
The episode begins with the death of Navy Commander Vincent Reynolds, resulting in an investigation led by Special Agent Leroy Jethro Gibbs' team. While working on the case, a mandatory psychological evaluation is conducted on each team member by Dr. Rachel Cranston.

Ziva identifies the shell casing as one used mostly by Koreans and Russians, leading the investigation to a South Korean journalist aboard the vessel named Min Ho Kwon. The Commander's best friend, Navy Admiral Wayne Hargrove, is notified about the death, and he says he and his wife were like a family to Commander Reynolds. Interrogated by Gibbs and DiNozzo, Kwon reveals he's a spy from North Korea taking pictures of the weapon system on the vessel. The timestamps on the pictures confirm his innocence.

While the team struggles to find a motive for the death of the Commander, Abby gets a match on the weapon using the shell casing found at the crime scene, a Russian TT-30. Only one owner of the pistol is connected to Commander Reynolds; Navy Seaman Marcus Leonard. McGee visits Leonard, but the pistol is missing from Leonard's collection, supposedly given to a friend. Commander Reynolds' brother, Peter Reynolds, informs McGee about a long-term relationship with a married woman named Nancy. Gibbs then contact Admiral Hargrove's wife, Nancy, about Commander Reynolds. She confirms the relationship.

Abby only finds Commander Reynolds' DNA on the evidence, which makes Gibbs believe Reynolds' death wasn't a murder. The two sailors who reported the death are interrogated by DiNozzo and Gibbs, and reveal that they made the suicide look like a murder in order to protect Commander Reynolds' honor. The Commander killed himself because he was about to lose everything he cared about.

During the investigation, Dr. Cranston talks to each team member about their personal and professional lives, going through different moments in their histories. Ziva expresses a yearning for stability in her life, saying, "I want something permanent. Something that can't be taken away. Is that too much to ask?" McGee is dismayed at his lack of success with relationships, while Abby states that she misses the deceased NCIS Special Agent Caitlin "Kate" Todd. DiNozzo admits to being afraid of living his life with nothing but his career.

It is later revealed that Dr. Cranston is Kate's elder sister. In an effort to help her find closure, Gibbs tells her that Ziva had fatally shot her own half-brother, Kate's killer, as shown in the season 3 episode "Kill Ari (Part II)".

At the end of the episode, Vance reads Dr. Cranston's report on the team - she makes it clear that they are a psychological disaster, but their selfless devotion toward each other and the job is why they succeed. She warns the director, however, that how the team reacts, for better or worse, "might catch up to [them]."

"A man walks into a bar and asks the bartender for a glass of water. The bartender pulls out a shotgun..."

== Production ==
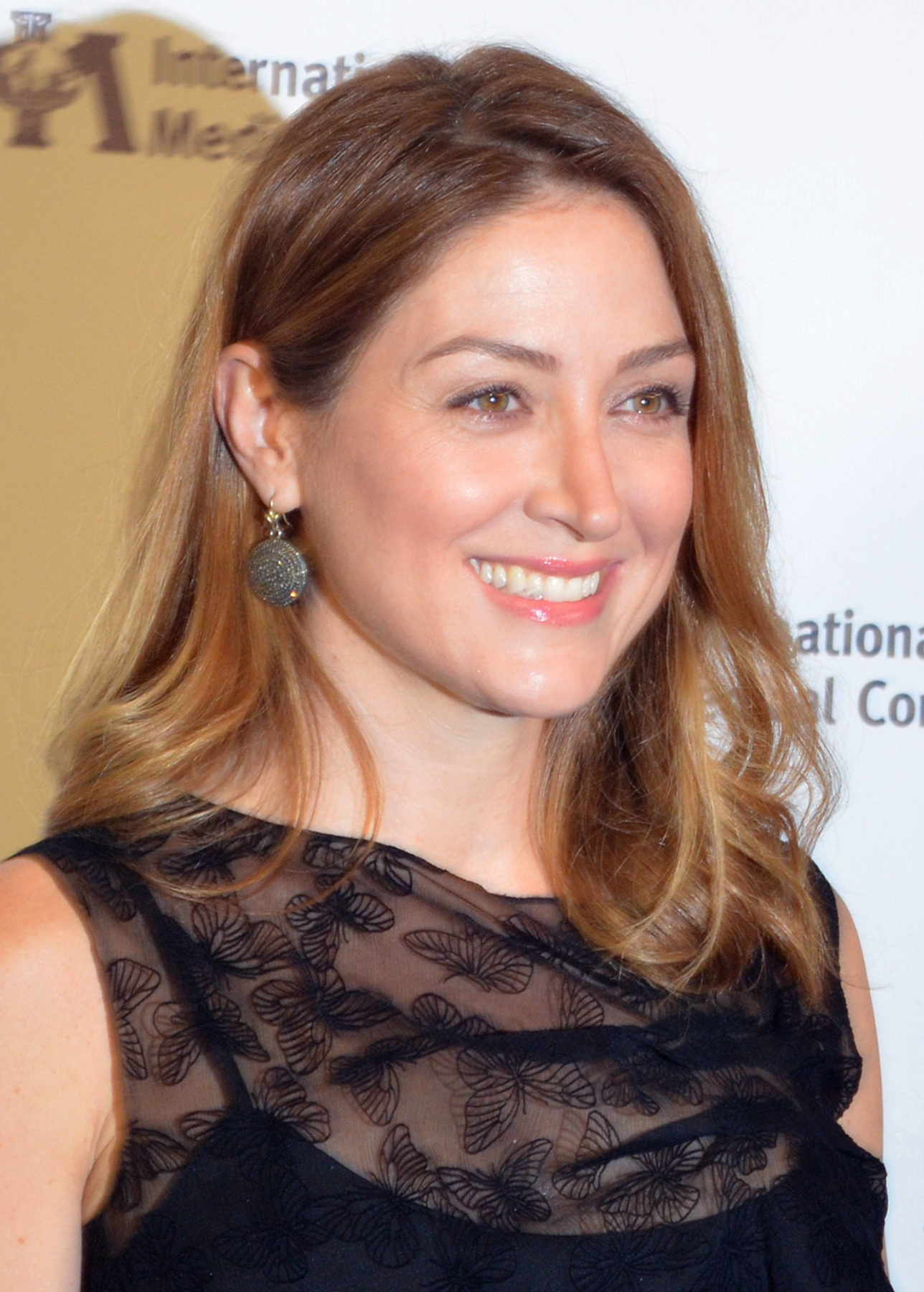
The death of Sasha Alexander's character Kate Todd was a big part of the episode.

The episode was written by Gary Glasberg and directed by James Whitmore, Jr. Glasberg wanted "to tell an emotional story for the characters" while at the same time "recap the last 8 seasons of the show", featured by old scenes using flashbacks from previous episodes. "The idea was to go back over eight seasons of television and pull bits and pieces", and "one of the trick with this episode was to find moments and opportunities for these sort of flashes to happen". For Mark Harmon, "this is [his] favourite kind of episode [because] it's everybody's story at the same time, and it all pushes all, including the crew, to do special things".

The flashbacks were used to "get into the characters' souls", and would "have some emotional impact". "We had to go deep and tight" to get the right view. One big part of the episode is about the death of Special Agent Caitlin Todd back in the season 2 episode "Twilight", who was killed off following Sasha Alexander's decision to leave the show. Both McGee, DiNozzo, Abby and Gibbs have flashbacks of their former friend and colleague. "It was a lovely valentine to Sasha", and "after all these years to finally say thanks", commented director Whitmore. Sasha Alexander voiced her own character Caitlin Todd during the conversation between Kate and her sister Rachel. These characters appear as a flashback: Jimmy Palmer, Eli David, Ari Haswari, Director Shepard and Caitlin Todd.

New and alternative scenes from earlier episodes were used to show key moments in the characters' lives, back to the very first episode "Yankee White". One scene has never been shown before, with Tony and Kate up on a roof, and is taken from the episode "An Eye for an Eye". It had been removed due to an editor cut before the episode aired. Michael Weatherly remembered the scene from the episode, and thought it could work for the episode.

Inspired by an old M*A*S*H episode where the unit talks to a psychiatrist "to make sure they all haven't lost their minds", Glasberg got the idea of introducing Dr. Cranston as "an interesting approach on the show". This is the first episode to feature clips of all the main characters (except Emily Wickersham's character Ellie Bishop, who joined the cast in season 11) in the series, and it introduces Dr. Rachel Cranston as a new recurring character on the show.

The title of the episode refer to the joke about a man who walks into a bar, and the response from the bartender. "Responses" in different situations is another big part of this episode, shown in flashbacks from the characters' own history of the show.

== Reception ==
"A Man Walks Into a Bar..." was seen by 20.35 million live viewers following its broadcast on February 8, 2011, with a 12.1/19 share among all households, and a 4.2/12 share among adults aged 18 to 49. A rating point represents one percent of the total number of television sets in American households, and a share means the percentage of television sets in use tuned to the program. In total viewers, "A Man Walks Into a Bar..." easily won NCIS and CBS the night, while the spin-off NCIS: Los Angeles drew second and was seen by 17.16 million viewers. It also became the fourth largest ratings for the week it aired.

CBS had a "lost scene"-competition about an unseen scene between Tony and Kate up on a roof, taken from the episode "An Eye for an Eye" in season 2.

The episode received positive reviews from critics and fans. Steve Marsi from TV Fanatic stated that "I had my doubts about the premise of this episode from the get-go, but the writers again deserve credit for turning what could have been clichéd filler into excellent TV".
