= JAG season 7 =

JAG
- Season 7
- Starring: David James Elliott; Catherine Bell; Patrick Labyorteaux; John M. Jackson; Scott Lawrence; Karri Turner; Trevor Goddard; Chuck Carrington; Randy Vasquez
- No. of episodes: 24

Release
- Original network: CBS
- Original release: September 25, 2001 – May 21, 2002

Season chronology
- ← Previous; Season 6 Next → Season 8

The seventh season of JAG premiered on CBS on September 25, 2001, and concluded on May 21, 2002. The season, starring David James Elliott and Catherine Bell, was produced by Belisarius Productions in association with Paramount Television.

== Plot ==
Commander Harmon "Harm" Rabb, Jr. (David James Elliott), a former Naval aviator turned lawyer, is assigned to the Headquarters of the Navy Judge Advocate General alongside fellow Marine Corps lawyer Lieutenant Colonel Sarah "Mac" MacKenzie (Catherine Bell), a squared away officer with a dysfunctional past. This season, Mac waits anxiously for news of Harm, who has been lost at sea ("Adrift"), before requesting an assignment away from JAG ("New Gun in Town"), while Commander Sturgis Turner (Scott Lawrence) joins the team. Also, Harm defends a Major accused of homicide ("Measure of Men") and a Marine is accused of rape ("Guilt"), Mac is awarded the Meritorious Service Medal ("Mixed Messages"), Harm faces disbarment ("Redemption"), and six Marines are killed in an ambush ("Ambush"). Later, the team run a marathon ("Jagathon"), The CAG (Terry O'Quinn) comes out of retirement ("Dog Robber"), and Jennifer Coates (Zoe McLellan) is assigned Harm as legal counsel ("Answered Prayers"), before Harm and Mac go up against Admiral Chegwidden (John M. Jackson) at a military tribunal when prosecuting a top Al-Qaeda terrorist, and Lieutenant Bud Roberts (Patrick Labyorteaux) is injured on a land mine in Afghanistan ("Enemy Below").

== Production ==
During its seventh season, JAG began to show "a surprising resurgence", with the season premiere achieving "the second-highest ratings in [the series'] seven-year history". Series creator Donald P. Bellisario "credits the national wave of patriotism for part of the show’s new strength. "People are tuning in to get some insight into what the military is all about," he says. "We show the positive and the negative, but we also give respect to those officers who lay it on the line." Lead actor David James Elliott, who portrays hunky lawyer Commander Harmon Rabb in the Navy's Judge Advocate General's office, agrees: "In the past, people thought the show was all about the military and just decided that they didn’t like it," says Elliott. "The fact that we’re feeling more favorably about our military can only help."

== Cast and characters ==
=== Main ===
- David James Elliott as Harmon Rabb, Jr., Commander, USN
- Catherine Bell as Sarah MacKenzie, Lieutenant Colonel, USMC
- Patrick Labyorteaux as Bud Roberts, Lieutenant, USN
- John M. Jackson as A. J. Chegwidden, Rear Admiral, USN

=== Also starring ===
- Karri Turner as Harriet Sims, Lieutenant, USN
- Trevor Goddard as Mic Brumby, Lieutenant Commander, RAN (episode 1)
- Randy Vasquez as Victor Galindez, Gunnery Sergeant, USMC
- Chuck Carrington as Petty Officer Jason Tiner, USN
- Scott Lawrence as Sturgis Turner, Commander, USN

=== Recurring ===
- Terry O'Quinn as Thomas Boone, Rear Admiral, "CAG"
- Paul Collins as Hon. Alexander Nelson, Secretary of the Navy
- Nanci Chambers as Loren Singer, Lieutenant, USN
- Zoe McLellan as Jennifer Coates, Petty Officer, USN
- W.K. Stratton as Theodore Lindsey, Commander, USN
- Sibel Galindez as Lieutenant Elizabeth "Skates" Hawkes, USN
- Steven Culp as Agent Clayton Webb, CIA
- Harrison Page as Rear Admiral Stiles Morris, USN
- Michael Bellisario as Midshipman Michael Roberts, USN
- Anne-Marie Johnson as Hon. Roberta Latham, Congresswoman
- Dana Sparks as Carolyn Imes, Commander, USN
- Mae Whitman as Chloe Maddison
- Jennifer Savidge as Commander Amy Helfman, military judge
- Corbin Bernsen as Captain Owen Sebring, military judge
- Isabella Hofmann as Meredith Cavanaugh
- Cindy Ambuehl as Rene Peterson, television producer

=== Guest appearances ===
- Lana Parrilla as Lieutenant Stephanie Donato
- Michele Greene as Lieutenant Colonel Sara Coffey, USAF judge advocate
- Dean Stockwell as Senator Edward Sheffield

== Episodes ==
No. overall	No. in season	Title	Directed by	Written by	Original release date	Prod. code	US viewers (millions)
135	1	"Adrift, Part II"	Bradford May	Dana Coen & Stephen Zito	September 25, 2001	135	17.81
After events in "Adrift, Part I," Harm is rescued and Skates revives him in sick bay. His rescue is complicated by amnesia and Mac makes a choice not to set another wedding date. Mic moves out of her apartment, feeling that their relationship is failing. Skates visits Harm at Bethesda Naval Hospital and tells him that she is returning to the fleet. Mac visits Harm at home and they try again to discuss their relationship. Mic rings and tells Mac that he feels that she has made her choice and that he is going back to Australia. Mac follows him to the Dulles airport and just misses him. She phones Harm in tears and he asks her to come back to his apartment. However, Renee beats her to it, with the news that her father has died. Harm tells Mac that they can't talk now and she is left in the alley alone, as rain starts to fall.
136	2	"New Gun in Town"	Terrence O'Hara	Stephen Zito	October 2, 2001	136	15.92
Mac requests an assignment away from JAG HQ with her first assignment being to investigate the disappearance of the JAG officer on the vessel to which she and Gunny are assigned to while Harm's Naval Academy classmate, Commander Sturgis Turner, a submariner-turned-lawyer arrives at JAG as the newest member of the team.
137	3	"Measure of Men"	Bradford May	Dana Coen	October 9, 2001	137	17.04
When Harm is assigned to defend a Major accused of negligent homicide during a training exercise in bad weather, Mac is forced to confront the feelings from which she is running.
138	4	"Guilt"	Greg Beeman	David Ehrman	October 16, 2001	138	17.27
A Marine Security Guard accused of rape by a local girl and chased by an angry mob. Mac and Galindez is sent ashore to secure release. After transfer from Indonesian custody, the U.S. consulate comes under siege and the Marine NCO in charge is killed. Mac, as the senior officer present, provides leadership and leads the evacuation of US citizens before the consulate is overrun by angry Indonesian civilians who are attempting to take matters into their hands by exacting revenge against the Marines. Back in the States, Singer gets on Harm's bad side by attacking Harriet's witness testimony during the trial of a Navy SEAL who killed a dangerous passenger on an airline.
139	5	"Mixed Messages"	Scott Brazil	Nan Hagan	October 23, 2001	139	17.88
A friend of Harm's who worked at Naval Security Group (cryptography) is killed and evidence indicates that he was passing secrets to the Chinese but all is not what it seems. Mac is awarded the Meritorious Service Medal for her TAD assignment (in previous episode), and Mac goes back privately to search for the young Indonesian girl whom she befriended during the consulate evacuation. Gabrielle Carteris guest stars as Michelle Stoechler. (Note: From an in universe point of view this episode takes place at least three weeks before the September 11 attacks as the episode begins on August 15, 2001.)
140	6	"Redemption"	James Whitmore Jr.	David Ehrman	October 30, 2001	142	14.90
Harm faces a possibility of disbarment after his investigation into allegations of fraternization uncovers suspected espionage and he feels compelled to break attorney–client privilege. Child-abuse allegations by a Navy mother against a civilian father elicit help from an unexpected source.
141	7	"Ambush"	Bradford May	Don McGill	November 6, 2001	140	16.67
When a Marine disobeys the Rules of engagement and six of his men are killed in an ambush, Harm must prove that the man was relying on verbal orders from his commander while Mac has to deal with a high-tech peeping Tom case involving a teenager on a Navy base.
142	8	"Jagathon"	Scott Brazil	Story by : Dana Coen and J. Jetsyn Tache; Teleplay by : Dana Coen	November 13, 2001	141	17.11
A friendly marathon for charity amongst the staff of JAG office becomes much more than that as long-standing, buried grudges and pride come into play while Harm deals with a man who keeps on impersonating Navy officers. Later, in the race, Harm and Mac reconcile their friendship after finishing joint second in the race, behind Sturgis who was a late minute entry.
143	9	"Dog Robber"	Terrence O'Hara	Stephen Zito	November 20, 2001	143	15.50
144	10	"Dog Robber"	Jerry London	Stephen Zito	November 27, 2001	144	15.99
Part I: Admiral Boone is called out of retirement to handle a diplomatic incident when a U.S. PC-3 Orion in the Taiwan Strait collides with a Chinese fighter jet and is then forced to make an emergency landing in China but one young Navy aviator's eagerness to save the aircraft from falling into the hands of the Chinese threatens to change things and ultimately jeopardize U.S.-Chinese relations altogether while Mac, Bud and Sturgis deals with two Naval Academy midshipmen who staged a duel. Part II: When a Naval aviator, on his own initiative, destroys the captured PC-3 Orion with missiles fired from an F-18 Hornet, Harm has to keep the incident from sparking a conflict between the USA and China while attempting to save the career of the aviator who in turn is facing a court-martial. As that goes on, Mac investigates a Marine commander at Marine Corps Combat Development Command who has been accused of sexism and discrimination of female marines.
145	11	"Answered Prayers"	Terrence O'Hara	Story by : Nan Hagen and Paul Levine; Teleplay by : Paul Levine	December 11, 2001	145	16.41
When Christmas closes the Navy brig, Harm is stuck watching larcenous Petty Officer Jennifer Coates. Bud's brother Mikey is nominated for an appointment to the Naval Academy. Harm gets a wonderful holiday present, courtesy of Clayton Webb. Harm's 1968 Corvette is "stolen" from his garage, only to be brought back to him by Sturgis, who took it to have the new top placed on it.
146	12	"Capital Crime"	Richard Compton	Don McGill	January 8, 2002	146	16.68
Mac and Sturgis get involved in the murder of a Navy Commander working for the Defense Threat Reduction Agency which leads to a much larger conspiracy involving Russian nuclear weapons. Caught up in the moment Mac admits to Sturgis that she's in love with Harm but then makes Sturgis promise never to tell another soul. Harm investigates a mishap involving a refueling exercise during bad weather.
147	13	"Code of Conduct"	Dennis Smith	Dana Coen	January 15, 2002	147	18.12
Harm must defend a Navy SEAL who, against orders, went back to rescue a team member who was wounded in a firefight, killing another officer. Admiral Chegwidden is asked to resign by the Secretary of the Navy after being caught on tape slapping an obnoxious loudmouth student at a high school. Chegwidden refuses to resign voluntarily and so has to face an inquiry, led by the Chief of Naval Operations, Admiral Drake (Note: John Roselius as Admiral Drake) with Mac serving as Chegwidden's counsel.
148	14	"Odd Man Out"	Michael Switzer	David Ehrman	January 22, 2002	148	16.26
Harm and Mac's case involving a medical corpsman accused of killing a Marine who apparently took the corpsman's Saint Christopher medal is complicated by Bud's appointment to the jury, with Bud believing that the Corpsman is not guilty due to a piece of evidence that has been excluded due to a break in the chain of custody at NCIS. Sturgis reaches out to help a Navy wife whose husband is on a long submarine deployment. Harm appears to have two tickets to the Super Bowl and his JAG HQ friends wonder how and who he will be taking. Note: This episode markes the last appearance of RIO Skates.
149	15	"Head to Toe"	Terrence O'Hara	Dana Coen & Don McGill	February 5, 2002	149	16.42
Harm and Mac go to Saudi Arabia to defend Lieutenant Stephanie Donato, (Note: Lana Parrilla as Lt. Stephanie Donato) a female naval aviator who flies C-130 Hercules while serving with the U.S. Air Force, but refuses to wear the abaya when off-base, creating tension between the base commander and a local cleric. Commander Sturgis Turner and Congresswoman Latham have their first dinner date. The episode is followed by a message that reads: On January 22, 2002, the Defense Department dropped its requirement that female military personnel in Saudi Arabia wear abayas off base. The regulations prohibiting women from driving or sitting in the front seat remain in force.
150	16	"The Mission"	Rod Hardy	Stephen Zito	February 26, 2002	150	17.12
151	17	"Exculpatory Evidence"	Harvey S. Laidman	Eric A. Morris	March 5, 2002	151	15.46
During a mission to brief troops about the new Rules of Engagement, Harm is asked to fly a special bombing mission into Afghanistan. Sturgis works closely with and gets closer to Congresswoman Latham. Lieutenant Loren Singer gets mad when Bud is earmarked for a promotion over her, but Bud's problems in court lead to more trouble for him. Bud is accused of failing to defend his client properly, and Mac is the key prosecution witness with Harm defending Bud in a case that could ultimately affect Bud's entire career not only as a lawyer but also Bud's whole career in the United States Navy. Otherwise, the staff try very hard to set up Admiral Chegwidden with a nice woman.
152	18	"Hero Worship"	Rod Hardy	Story by : Dana Coen; Teleplay by : Don McGill & Dana Coen	March 12, 2002	152	16.36
A fire aboard a Navy destroyer on a training cruise may be the result of negligence or the ship's advanced age. Admiral Chegwidden tries to help Henry Guernsey, (Note: Graham Jarvis as Henry Guernsey) an elderly Medal of Honor recipient from World War II, who is being barred from attending a White House gala because he was brought up on shop-lifting charges due to his failing memory.
153	19	"First Casualty"	Oz Scott	Paul Levine	March 26, 2002	153	15.85
Harm and Mac are tasked with a delicate case when the President decides to court-martial ZNN reporter Stuart Dunston, (Note: John D'Aquino as Stuart Dunston) who may have revealed a Navy SEAL unit's position in Afghanistan. Bud receives his orders to deploy overseas.
154	20	"Port Chicago"	Jeannot Szwarc	Don McGill	April 9, 2002	154	14.82
Sturgis' father Chaplain Matthew Turner (Note: Bill Cobbs as Chaplain Matthew Turner) asks him to help clear Chief Aubrey McBride, (Note: Carl Gordon as Chief Aubrey McBride) an African-American Navy man who was court-martialed for refusing to return to work after the Port Chicago disaster during World War II. Harriet buys a new home without telling Bud.
155	21	"Tribunal"	Mark Horowitz	Charles Holland	April 30, 2002	155	13.60
Harm and Mac go up against the Admiral and Sturgis in the military tribunal of high-ranking Al-Qaeda member Mostafa Atef, (Note: Marc Casabani as Mostafa Atef) who was captured during a raid in Afghanistan. When it's revealed that a sniper shooting at the team that subsequently captured the terrorist may be in fact be the terrorist's brother, Kabir Atef, Mac heads into Afghanistan with Clayton Webb to get information on an upcoming Al-Qaeda terror plot with the two meeting Gunny Galindez, while Harm continues prosecuting at the tribunal with Admiral Chegwidden and Sturgis defending. During the Admiral's absence, Lieutenant Loren Singer runs the office, having been appointed acting JAG and makes no new friends whatsoever.
156	22	"Defending His Honor"	Jeannot Szwarc	Lynnie Greene & Richard Levine	May 7, 2002	156	13.21
When Navy Judge Captain Owen Sebring is accused of vehicular manslaughter that leaves a baby dead, Harm must determine if the man's personal life caused him to behave violently on the road. Singer causes trouble between Bud and Harriet.
157	23	"In Country"	Hugo Cortina	Dana Coen	May 14, 2002	157	12.84
Part 1 of 3: While "in country" to investigate an attack which killed three civilians, Harm and Mac become trapped overnight in a minefield when their HMMWV leaves the road. Bud's unique approach to interrogations, discussing the "Prime Directive" from Star Trek with the detainee, produces results while Webb teaches Gunny hard lessons about love and the cost of war.
158	24	"Enemy Below"	Bradford May	Story by : Donald P. Bellisario; Teleplay by : Charles Holland	May 21, 2002	158	14.15
Part 2 of 3: The clock ticks as the JAG team tracks down Al-Qaeda terrorist Kabir Atef (Note: Francesco Quinn as Kabir Atef) to thwart his plan to use an Iranian diesel-electric submarine operated by a vengeful renegade Russian submarine captain, Mikhail Yerastov (Note: Bo Svenson as Capt. Mikhail Yerastov) to launch a dirty nuke cruise missile at an American carrier battle group in the Arabian Sea. Sturgis is temporarily assigned to the Los Angeles-class submarine USS Watertown to assist Cmdr. John Flagler (Note: Tom Amandes as Cmdr. John Flagler) in hunting Yerastov's submarine. Harm's aviator skills are put to the test to stop the missile from hitting the USS Seahawk and unleashing harmful radiation which would kill everyone on board including Captain Johnson, (Note: Scott Paulin as Captain Johnson) Mac and Bud. During a mission to an Afghan village to rebuild a schoolhouse that was destroyed in an accidental attack by the U.S. Navy, Bud attempts to save a young Afghan boy trapped in a mine field, but he steps on a landmine which explodes and severs his right leg. The episode ends in a cliffhanger that continues in the Season 8 premiere, "Critical Condition."

== See also ==
- 2001–02 United States network television schedule
