= List of awards and nominations received by NCIS =

The American drama television series NCIS has received many awards and nominations since it premiered on September 23, 2003.

Award	Year (Note: The listed year refers to the date of the ceremony, not necessarily the year in which the corresponding season or episode aired.)	Category	Nominee(s)	Result	Ref.
ALMA Award	2008	Outstanding Actress in a Drama Television Series	Cote de Pablo	Nominated	
ALMA Award	2009	Year in TV Drama – Actress	Cote de Pablo	Nominated	
ALMA Award	2011	Favorite TV Actress – Leading Role in a Drama	Cote de Pablo	Won	
ALMA Award	2012	Favorite TV Actress – Drama	Cote de Pablo	Nominated	
ASCAP Awards	2004	Top TV Series	Steven Bramson	Won	
ASCAP Awards	2004	Top TV Series	Matt Hawkins, Maurice Jackson, Neil Martin	Won	
ASCAP Awards	2006	Top TV Series	Matt Hawkins, Maurice Jackson, Neil Martin	Won	
ASCAP Awards	2007	Top TV Series	Matt Hawkins, Maurice Jackson, Neil Martin	Won	
ASCAP Awards	2008	Top TV Series	Matt Hawkins, Maurice Jackson, Neil Martin	Won	
ASCAP Awards	2009	Top TV Series	Matt Hawkins, Maurice Jackson, Neil Martin	Won	
ASCAP Awards	2010	Top TV Series	Matt Hawkins, Maurice Jackson, Neil Martin	Won	
ASCAP Awards	2011	Top TV Series	Matt Hawkins, Maurice Jackson, Neil Martin	Won	
ASCAP Awards	2012	Top TV Series	Matt Hawkins, Maurice Jackson, Neil Martin	Won	
ASCAP Awards	2013	Top TV Series	Matt Hawkins, Maurice Jackson, Neil Martin	Nominated	
BMI Film & TV Awards	2005	BMI Network Television Music Awards	Joseph Conlan	Won	
BMI Film & TV Awards	2008	BMI Network Television Music Awards	Brian Kirk	Won	
BMI Film & TV Awards	2009	BMI Network Television Music Awards	Brian Kirk	Won	
BMI Film & TV Awards	2010	BMI Network Television Music Awards	Brian Kirk	Won	
BMI Film & TV Awards	2011	BMI Network Television Music Awards	Brian Kirk	Won	
BMI Film & TV Awards	2012	BMI Network Television Music Awards	Brian Kirk	Won	
BMI Film & TV Awards	2013	BMI Network Television Music Awards	Brian Kirk	Won	
BMI Film & TV Awards	2014	BMI Network Television Music Awards	Brian Kirk	Won	
BMI Film & TV Awards	2015	BMI Network Television Music Awards	Brian Kirk	Won	
BMI Film & TV Awards	2016	BMI Network Television Music Awards	Brian Kirk	Won	
BMI Film & TV Awards	2017	BMI Network Television Music Awards	Brian Kirk	Won	
BMI Film & TV Awards	2018	BMI Network Television Music Awards	Brian Kirk	Won	
BMI Film & TV Awards	2019	BMI Network Television Music Awards	Brian Kirk	Won	
BMI Film & TV Awards	2020	BMI Network Television Music Awards	Brian Kirk	Won	
BMI Film & TV Awards	2021	BMI Network Television Music Awards	Brian Kirk	Won	
BMI Film & TV Awards	2022	BMI Network Television Music Awards	Brian Kirk	Won	
California on Location Awards	2008	Location Team of the Year (Episodic Television)	Jim McClafferty, Joel Sinderman, Emily Esses, Darrin Lipscomb, Damon Rivetti	Won	
California on Location Awards	2013	Location Team of the Year (Episodic Television)	Emily Kirylo, Jim McClafferty, Joel Sinderman, Michael Soleau	Won	
GLAAD Media Awards	2012	Outstanding Individual Episode (in a series without a regular LGBT character)	NCIS	Nominated	
GLAAD Media Awards	2016	Outstanding Individual Episode (in a series without a regular LGBT character)	NCIS	Nominated	
Golden Nymph Awards	2014	International TV Audience Award, Best Drama TV Series	NCIS	Won	
Golden Nymph Awards	2015	International TV Audience Award, Best Drama TV Series	NCIS	Won	
Golden Nymph Awards	2017	International TV Audience Award, Best Drama TV Series	NCIS	Won	
Hollywood Professional Association Awards	2012	Outstanding Compositing – Television	Bob Minshall, Mark Intravartolo, Jeremy Jozwik and Carrie Smith	Won	
Hollywood Professional Association Awards	2020	Outstanding Visual Effects – Episodic (Over 13 Episodes)	Matt Von Brock, Javier Gallego, Carrie Smith, Erik O'Donnell, Del Depierro, Bob Minshall	Nominated	
ICG Publicists Awards	2010	Maxwell Weinberg Publicist Showmanship – Television	NCIS (Shared with NCIS: Los Angeles)	Won	
Imagen Foundation Awards	2006	Best Supporting Actress/Television	Cote de Pablo	Nominated	
Imagen Foundation Awards	2008	Best Supporting Actress/Television	Cote de Pablo	Won	
Imagen Foundation Awards	2009	Best Supporting Actress/Television	Cote de Pablo	Nominated	
Imagen Foundation Awards	2011	Best Actress/Television	Cote de Pablo	Nominated	
Imagen Foundation Awards	2019	Best Supporting Actor – Television	Wilmer Valderrama	Won	
Imagen Foundation Awards	2020	Best Supporting Actress – Television	Cote de Pablo	Nominated	
Media Access Awards	2014	Casting Society of America Award	Susan Bluestein & Jason Kennedy	Won	
NAACP Image Awards	2010	Outstanding Supporting Actor in a Drama Series	Rocky Carroll	Nominated	
NAACP Image Awards	2013	Outstanding Supporting Actor in a Drama Series	Rocky Carroll	Nominated	
People's Choice Awards	2010	Favorite TV Drama	NCIS	Nominated	
People's Choice Awards	2010	Favorite TV Drama Actor	Mark Harmon	Nominated	
People's Choice Awards	2011	Favorite TV Drama	NCIS	Nominated	
People's Choice Awards	2011	Favorite TV Crime Fighter	Mark Harmon	Nominated	
People's Choice Awards	2012	Favorite TV Crime Drama	NCIS	Nominated	
People's Choice Awards	2013	Favorite TV Crime Drama	NCIS	Nominated	
People's Choice Awards	2014	Favorite TV Crime Drama	NCIS	Nominated	
People's Choice Awards	2014	Favorite Dramatic TV Actress	Pauley Perrette	Nominated	
People's Choice Awards	2014	Favorite TV Drama Actor	Mark Harmon	Nominated	
People's Choice Awards	2015	Favorite TV Show	NCIS	Nominated	
People's Choice Awards	2015	Favorite TV Icon	Mark Harmon	Nominated	
People's Choice Awards	2016	Favorite TV Crime Drama	NCIS	Nominated	
People's Choice Awards	2016	Favorite TV Crime Drama Actor	Mark Harmon	Nominated	
People's Choice Awards	2016	Favorite TV Crime Drama Actress	Pauley Perrette	Nominated	
People's Choice Awards	2017	Favorite TV Crime Drama	NCIS	Nominated	
People's Choice Awards	2017	Favorite TV Crime Drama Actor	Mark Harmon	Won	
People's Choice Awards	2017	Favorite TV Crime Drama Actress	Pauley Perrette	Nominated	
Primetime Emmy Award	2005	Outstanding Guest Actor in a Drama Series	Charles Durning / "Call of Silence"	Nominated	
Primetime Emmy Award	2008	Outstanding Stunt Coordination	Diamond Farnsworth / "Requiem"	Nominated	
Primetime Emmy Award	2013	Outstanding Stunt Coordination for a Drama Series, Miniseries, or Movie	Diamond Farnsworth / "Revenge"	Nominated	
Seoul International Drama Awards	2010	Most Popular Foreign Drama of the Year	NCIS	Won	
Joey Awards	2018	Best Actor in a Principal Role in a Television Series	Alexander Davis	Nominated	
Visual Effects Society Awards	2004	Outstanding Matte Painting in a Televised Program, Music Video or Commercial	Steven J. Rogers / "Yankee White"	Nominated	
Young Artist Awards	2005	Best Performance in a TV Series (Comedy or Drama) – Guest Starring Young Actor	Cody Estes	Nominated	
Young Artist Awards	2008	Best Performance in a TV Series – Guest Starring Young Actor	Dominic Scott Kay / "Lost & Found"	Nominated	
Young Artist Awards	2011	Best Performance in a TV Series – Guest Starring Young Actress 11-15	Madisen Beaty	Won	
Young Artist Awards	2011	Best Performance in a TV Series – Guest Starring Young Actress 11-15	Sadie Calvano	Nominated	
Young Artist Awards	2012	Best Performance in a TV Series – Guest Starring Young Actress Ten and Under	Madisen Beaty	Nominated	
Young Artist Awards	2020	Best Performance Guest Starring Teen Artist – TV Series	Sloane Morgan Siegel	Nominated	
Young Entertainer Awards	2018	Best Guest Starring Young Actor 10 & Under – Television Series	Alexander Davis	Nominated	
Young Entertainer Awards	2020	Best Guest Starring Young Actor – Television Series	Sloane Morgan Siegel	Nominated	
