= JAG season 8 =

JAG
- Season 8
- Starring: David James Elliott; Catherine Bell; Patrick Labyorteaux; John M. Jackson; Scott Lawrence; Zoe McLellan; Karri Turner; Nanci Chambers; Randy Vasquez
- No. of episodes: 24

Release
- Original network: CBS
- Original release: September 24, 2002 – May 20, 2003

Season chronology
- ← Previous; JAG season 7 Next → JAG season 9 NCIS season 1

The eighth season of JAG premiered on CBS on September 24, 2002, and concluded on May 20, 2003. The season, starring David James Elliott and Catherine Bell, was produced by Belisarius Productions in association with Paramount Television.

Two episodes, "Ice Queen" and "Meltdown", also introduced the team who later appeared in the spin-off series NCIS, which became a franchise in its own right.

== Plot ==
Tenacious lawyer Lieutenant Colonel Sarah "Mac" MacKenzie (Catherine Bell), a by-the-book Marine, is tasked with prosecuting, defending, and enforcing the laws of the sea as a member of the Navy's elite Judge Advocate General Corps. Along with her partner Commander Harmon "Harm" Rabb, Jr. (David James Elliott) - a former Tomcat pilot - Mac investigates a plethora of cases including desertion ("The Promised Land"), oxygen deprivation ("In Thin Air"), sexual harassment ("Offensive Action"), a mishap aboard the USS Seahawk ("When the Bough Breaks"), and a death during surgery ("Complications"). Also this season, Bud Roberts (Patrick Labyorteaux) is injured in Afghanistan ("Critical Condition"), Petty Officer Jennifer Coates (Zoe McLellan) joins JAG ("All Ye Faithful"), Commander Theodore Lindsey (W.K. Stratton) returns ("Fortunate Son"), Clayton Webb (Steven Culp) goes missing in Paraguay ("A Tangled Webb"), and Rear Admiral A.J. Chegwidden (John M. Jackson) accidentally ejects from an F-14 Tomcat ("Heart and Soul"). Meanwhile, Lieutenant Loren Singer (Nanci Chambers) is murdered ("Ice Queen"), placing Leroy Jethro Gibbs (Mark Harmon) and his NCIS team directly in Harm's way ("Meltdown").

== Production ==
In January 2003, CBS president Leslie Moonves announced that JAG executive producer and showrunner Donald P. Bellisario was developing a JAG spin-off, based on the work of the Naval Criminal Investigative Service. Tentatively titled Navy CIS, the series premiered during the JAG episodes "Ice Queen" and "Meltdown". Also this season, Dean Stockwell joins the cast as his First Monday character Senator Edward Sheffield.

== Cast and characters ==
=== Main ===
- David James Elliott as Harmon Rabb, Jr., Commander
- Catherine Bell as Sarah MacKenzie, Lieutenant Colonel in the Marine Corps.
- Patrick Labyorteaux as Bud Roberts, Lieutenant
- John M. Jackson as A. J. Chegwidden, Rear Admiral

=== Also starring ===
- Karri Turner as Harriet Sims, Lieutenant
- Randy Vasquez as Victor Galindez, Gunnery Sergeant in the Marine Corps.
- Nanci Chambers as Loren Singer, Lieutenant
- Zoe McLellan as Jennifer Coates, Petty Officer
- Scott Lawrence as Sturgis Turner, Commander

=== Recurring ===
- Terry O'Quinn as Thomas Boone, Rear Admiral, "CAG"
- Paul Collins as Alexander Nelson, departing Secretary of the Navy
- W.K. Stratton as Theodore Lindsey, Commander
- Steven Culp as Clayton Webb, CIA Agent
- Chuck Carrington as Jason Tiner, Petty Officer
- Harrison Page as Stiles Morris, Rear Admiral
- Claudette Nevins as Porter Webb, NSA Agent
- Michael Bellisario as Michael Roberts, Midshipman
- Dana Sparks as Carolyn Imes, Commander
- Jennifer Savidge as Amy Helfman, Commander
- Tamlyn Tomita as Tracy Manetti, Lieutenant Commander
- Dean Stockwell as Edward Sheffield, new Secretary of the Navy
- Jameson Parker as Harrison Kershaw, Deputy Director of Central Intelligence
- Laura Putney as Catherine Gale, CIA Attorney
- Isabella Hofmann as Meredith Cavanaugh

=== Guest appearances ===
- Mark Harmon as Leroy Jethro Gibbs, NCIS Supervisory Special Agent (SSA) assigned to Washington Navy Yard
- Robyn Lively as Vivian Blackadder, NCIS Special Agent
- Michael Weatherly as Anthony DiNozzo, NCIS Special Agent, second in command
- Tom Jay Jones as Don Dobbs, NCIS Special Agent
- Pauley Perrette as Abigail Sciuto, Forensic Specialist attached to NCIS
- David McCallum as Dr. Donald Mallard, Chief Medical Examiner for NCIS
- Alan Dale as Thomas Morrow, NCIS Director
- Faran Tahir as Amad Bin Atwa
- Alicia Coppola as Faith Coleman, JAG Lieutenant Commander
- Michael Muhney as Jack McBurney, Major in the Marine Corps, NCIS Liaison

== Episodes ==
No. overall	No. in season	Title	Directed by	Written by	Original release date	Prod. code	US viewers (millions)
159	1	"Critical Condition"	Jeannot Szwarc	Story by : Donald P. Bellisario and Charles Holland; Teleplay by : Charles Holland	September 24, 2002	159	16.13
Part 3 of 3: During events in "Enemy Below," Bud and Coates's trip to Afghanistan took a turn for the worse when Bud attempted to save a young Afghan boy from a minefield. Bud is left badly injured with his right leg being lost after he stepped on a landmine. As the JAG staff wait for news about his condition, everyone recalls their various meetings with Bud that have occurred over the last several years. Admiral Chegwidden and Lieutenant Singer both testify before the Senate Select Committee on Intelligence about the dirty bomb attack that was stopped, with the outcome eventually costing Alexander Nelson his job as SECNAV.
160	2	"The Promised Land"	Scott Brazil	Dana Coen	October 1, 2002	160	14.81
Harm and Mac are tasked with defending a Marine who converted to Judaism, deserted his unit after facing prejudice from them and his family and joined the Israeli Army. Turner is joined by Singer on the case and ultimately is disgusted by her attitude and actions. Bud returns home to begin rehabilitation after losing part of his leg in Afghanistan and is subsequently awarded the Purple Heart while Singer receives new orders.
161	3	"Family Business"	Bradford May	Steven Smith	October 8, 2002	161	14.82
Harm defends a Marine Gunnery Sergeant accused of murdering his wife but the man's refusal to let his young son testify hampers the Gunnery Sergeant's own claims of self-defense. Singer leaves and everyone's happy to see her go except for Sergei, which doesn't make Harm happy. Bud's father, Big Bud Roberts (Jeff MacKay) gets over himself and finally arrives at the hospital to help his son with rehab.
162	4	"Dangerous Game"	Terrence O'Hara	John Chambers	October 15, 2002	162	15.03
After events in "Critical Condition," U.S. Senator Edward Sheffield begins his tenure as the new Secretary of the Navy, having been sworn in to replace Alexander Nelson, Harm finds himself partnered with a new JAG officer, Lieutenant Commander Tracy Manetti (Note: Tamlyn Tomita as Lt. Cmdr. Tracy Manetti) as Harm and Manetti find themselves prosecuting a Navy SEAL accused of recklessness during a wargame exercise which killed a civilian deputy sheriff while Mac and Turner defend the SEAL.
163	5	"In Thin Air"	Harvey S. Laidman	Don McGill	October 22, 2002	163	14.56
A routine flight from the USS Patrick Henry results in the RIO being left comatose after being deprived of oxygen for four minutes. When the RIO eventually dies, having never regained consciousness after slipping into a coma caused by the deprivation, a Petty Officer who works as the maintenance office on the ship is accused of negligent homicide. Harm is assigned to defend the Petty Officer while Mac prosecutes but Harm's attitude and conviction that the Petty Officer is guilty ultimately sees Admiral Chegwidden stepping in and severing Harm's connection to the case while Sturgis Turner is appointed as Harm's replacement. As the case drags on, Harm has a possible theory as to what happened but it's one that could be potentially fatal while Bud is getting increasingly restless and eager to return to work as a JAG lawyer but Harriet intentionally ruins his plans, as she fears for Bud's health.
164	6	"Offensive Action"	Dennis Smith	Lynnie Greene & Richard Levine	October 29, 2002	164	15.66
Harm and Manetti defend a Navy pilot accused of ruining the career of an officer under her command because he rejected her sexual advances while Mac and Turner prosecute.
165	7	"Need to Know"	Bradford May	Philip DeGuere, Jr.	November 5, 2002	165	14.69
As a favor from Congresswoman Lillian Dorning, SECNAV Sheffield asks the JAG staff to get the story of a submarine, USS Angel Shark (SSGN-559), which was lost on a CIA mission in 1968, declassified as Congresswoman Dorning's father was the skipper of the submarine. Now, Harm, Mac and Sturgis must now take on the complex system of classified information and the CIA bureaucracy as well as a CIA lawyer who will stop at nothing in keeping the truth covered up.
166	8	"Ready or Not"	Philip Sgriccia	Don McGill	November 12, 2002	166	14.89
A Joint Staff wargame ends with Harm battling to save the career of a marine Major General who's up for a court-martial due to the General disobeying orders, where he faces off in court against both Turner's prosecution and the judge, Mac. (Note: This episode was likely inspired by the allegations surrounding the Millennium Challenge 2002 wargame.)
167	9	"When the Bough Breaks"	Richard Compton	Darcy Meyers	November 19, 2002	167	15.75
A misshap on the USS Seahawk results in the death of a sailor, prompting Lieutenant Singer to request that seven sailors be court-martialed. When Captain Johnson, the skipper of the Seahawk charges Singer with "conduct unbecoming" due to Singer being three and a half months pregnant, Mac is given the assignment of secretly investigating Lieutenant Singer while Harm attempts to find out what really happened.
168	10	"The Killer"	Michael Schultz	Charles Holland	November 26, 2002	168	15.15
Harm and Manetti travel to Naples to investigate whether a series of prostitute murders in Europe is related to a U.S. destroyer that makes ports of call in the same cities while Harriet learns of Singer's plight and tries to help her.
169	11	"All Ye Faithful"	Kenneth Johnson	Dana Coen	December 17, 2002	169	13.62
As the JAG team attempt to get together for Christmas, they each face a different crisis of their own. As Turner helps a young Corporal who has lost his home due to the Corporal's loud drumming playing and whose wife is due to give birth any moment, Harm and Admiral Boone attempt to get back to the United States and Petty Officer Jennifer Coates joins the JAG office on a permanent basis. The episode is followed by a message that reads: To the men and women of our armed forces dedicated to keeping peace on Earth.
170	12	"Complications"	Bradford May	Paul Levine	January 7, 2003	170	16.05
Harm and Mac are asked to investigate claims by a Marine General that a Navy doctor was negligent and killed the General's sixteen year-old daughter during surgery with the General believing that there was a cover-up concerning his daughter's death. Mac soon finds herself also battling to save the General's career when the General himself faces a possible court-martial after intimidating the Navy personnel who helped treat his teenage daughter while Bud is left increasingly frustrated by the low-level work he is given, until he stumbles onto a disability case that doesn't sit well with him while Harm angrily confronts Singer about her pregnancy. Bud is eventually granted permanent limited duty, bringing him back to JAG on a full-time basis.
171	13	"Standards of Conduct"	Rod Hardy	Philip DeGuere, Jr.	January 21, 2003	171	14.30
A Navy whistle-blower claims a high-tech combat system is severely defective, but when Mac gets him released from the service, she discovers that he had an ulterior motive. Harm is targeted by an ambulance-chasing lawyer in a scam while the JAG staff hold a ceremony to celebrate Harm and Sturgis's respective and recent achievements (at the end of last season).
172	14	"Each of Us Angels"	Bradford May	Darcy Meyers	February 4, 2003	172	14.10
A special episode focusing on Navy Nurses in WWII before and during the Battle of Iwo Jima and which has the JAG ensemble playing various members of the group. This story is told by a veteran to a young woman at a grave in Arlington National Cemetery. The episode is followed by a message that reads: Dedicated to all the angels who have served in peace and war. Bless them all.
173	15	"Friendly Fire"	Kenneth Johnson	Paul Levine	February 11, 2003	173	13.54
An American pilot accidentally bombs a British combat position in Afghanistan, killing three British soldiers and wounding three others. As the public and high-profile case gets underway, Mac and Bud prosecute while Turner defends with Harm serving as the judge, leading to tension between Harm and Mac as the case progresses. (Note: Probably inspired by the Tarnak Farm incident.)
174	16	"Heart and Soul"	Bradford May	Dana Coen	February 18, 2003	174	15.36
When Admiral Chegwidden accidentally ejects from an F-14 piloted by Rabb over the George Washington National Forest, he must call upon all his Navy SEAL training to try to survive until help arrives. While Rabb searches for him, Mac has to judge a case with Sturgis and Roberts as advocates.
175	17	"Empty Quiver"	Kenneth Johnson	Philip DeGuere, Jr.	February 25, 2003	175	15.80
When a torpedo with a nuclear warhead mysteriously disappears from a Navy submarine at Naval Station Norfolk, the base is put on lockdown. Sturgis personally heads to the submarine to investigate if the warhead's disappearance was accidental or something more sinister. Meanwhile, Harm is trapped in the base, having arrived to search for evidence concerning a Lieutenant who has been accused of stealing and is facing a court-martial. Harm soon discovers evidence of a Petty Officer who's planning to steal ten million dollars from the base.
176	18	"Fortunate Son"	Terrence O'Hara	Darcy Meyers	March 18, 2003	176	14.03
When a Marine pilot who was born in Vietnam and came to the United States as a refugee at the fall of Saigon confesses to human trafficking, Harm and Mac must dig deeper to find the truth before the INS arrests him. In the aftermath of Chegwidden ejecting from an F-14, Commander Theodore Lindsey arrives at JAG for a review at the SECNAV's request, where the unpopular former JAG staff officer clashes with everyone he meets and promises to overturn the place he once worked.
177	19	"Second Acts"	Kenneth Johnson	Story by : Don McGill; Teleplay by : Philip DeGuere, Jr.	April 1, 2003	177	11.85
The JAG office must come together to prevent Commander Lindsey's recommendations from being enacted. An enlisted Navy man who prevented a major terrorist disaster in Uzbekistan turns out to be the same person who was listed as having died in the 9/11 terror attacks.
178	20	"Ice Queen"	Donald P. Bellisario	Donald P. Bellisario & Don McGill	April 22, 2003	178	13.84
Part 1 of 2: The JAG staff find their usual routines being interrupted and their lives turned upside down as well as their dark secrets exposed when the badly decayed remains of Lieutenant Loren Singer who has been missing for three weeks are discovered in a tree in Potomac Park by a young boy scout searching for his arrow. As the Naval Criminal Investigative Service (NCIS) team led by Supervisory Special Agent Leroy Jethro Gibbs (Note: Mark Harmon as Leroy Jethro Gibbs) investigates the circumstances surrounding Singer's murder, evidence eventually puts Harm forward as the prime suspect while Sergei, Harm's half-brother is believed to be the father of Singer's unborn baby. NCIS must also break a terrorist who could contain key information on a potential terrorist attack. (Note: The episodes "Ice Queen" and "Meltdown" serve as the two-part backdoor pilot for the spin-off show, NCIS.)
179	21	"Meltdown"	Scott Brazil	Donald P. Bellisario & Don McGill	April 29, 2003	179	13.63
Part 2 of 2: As the JAG team try to cope with Harm's upcoming trial and also with the fact that they will have to testify against him, NCIS continue their investigation into Singer's murder while attempting to stop an impending terrorist attack but when Gibbs leaves to interview a captured terrorist, it falls to Gibbs's colleagues, NCIS Special Agent Anthony DiNozzo (Note: Michael Weatherly as Anthony DiNozzo) and Vivian Blackadder (Note: Robyn Lively as Vivian Blackadder) to find the evidence that will ultimately lead them to the true killer and save Harm from a lifetime in the brig but time is running out.
180	22	"Lawyers, Guns, and Money"	Bradford May	Dana Coen & Stephen Zito	May 6, 2003	180	12.75
Part 1 of 4: CIA agent Clayton Webb recruits Mac for an undercover assignment in the South American country of Paraguay to recover one-hundred stolen stinger missiles. They must first trade with drug lord Raul Garcia (Note: Marco Rodríguez as Raul Garcia) in order to locate the terrorist who has the weapons. Bud must defend Sturgis when he is accused of incompetence on a case and Harm returns to work after being cleared of murdering Lieutenant Loren Singer. Mac and Webb are double-crossed by Garcia, who hold them at gunpoint....
181	23	"Pas de Deux"	Bradford May	Dana Coen & Stephen Zito	May 13, 2003	181	12.64
Part 2 of 4: Webb convinces Garcia to spare their lives with the promise to sell him a Predator drone. With Mac undercover and incommunicado, Harm seeks help from CIA attorney Catherine Gale (after events in "Need to Know"). Harm plays along when she asks him to pose as her boyfriend in front of Gale's mother who is dying of heart failure. Mac and Web locate the terrorist base of Sadik Fahd (Note: Bernard White as Sadik Fahd) to rescue Gunny Galindez. Gunny is shot, and Webb's SUV is hit by a grenade....
182	24	"A Tangled Webb, Part I"	Bradford May	Stephen Zito	May 20, 2003	182	13.27
Part 3 of 4: Harm resigns his commission and heads off to rescue Webb and Mac after their capture by Fahd's men. Web is tortured by Fahd. Harm and Gunny rescue them just before Fahd can begin torturing Mac. While Gunny gets Webb to the hospital, Mac and Harm use a biplane to destroy the stinger missiles, but then crash into a forest after being shot down by terrorists, ending the season on a cliffhanger that continues in Season 9, "A Tangled Webb, Part II."

== See also ==
- 2002–2003 United States network television schedule
