= Twilight (NCIS) =

- NCIS episode
- Episode no.: Season 2 Episode 23
- Directed by: Thomas J. Wright
- Written by: John Kelley
- Original air date: May 24, 2005

Guest appearances
- Rudolf Martin as Ari Haswari; Brian Dietzen as Jimmy Palmer; Benjamin John Parrillo as Rex Eberlee; Shane Conrad as Navy Lt. Dean Westfall; Dennis Cockrum as NSA Tech; Alan Dale as NCIS Director Tom Morrow; Joe Spano as Senior FBI Agent Tobias Fornell; Ryan Culver as Navy Lt. Curtis Janssen

Episode chronology
← Previous "SWAK"	Next → "Kill Ari (Part I)"

"Twilight" is the 23rd and last episode in the second season, and the 46th overall episode, of the American crime drama television series NCIS. It first aired on CBS in the United States on May 24, 2005. The episode is written by John Kelley and directed by Thomas J. Wright, and was seen by 14.74 million viewers.

With Ari Haswari back in the country again and out to kill Gibbs, the team find themselves attempting to stop Ari from completing the task. In the meantime, they also try to find out who killed two off-duty sailors whose deaths might be linked to an upcoming terrorist attack and the theft of a drone from a company. But in the end, it might not be enough as NCIS find themselves paying a very high price for their efforts when one of their own is brutally murdered in Gibbs and Ari's battle with each other...

The episode also marks the final regular appearance of Special Agent Kate Todd (played by Sasha Alexander), who is later replaced by Mossad Officer Ziva David (played by Cote de Pablo). Todd is later shown in Season 8, episode "A Man Walks Into a Bar..." as a memory by the rest of the team, and in the Season 9 episode "Life Before His Eyes" as the wife of DiNozzo in an alternative universe in Gibbs' mind. Both of the episodes include scenes from this episode as flashbacks.

== Plot ==
Two men are gunned down in their car, both pilots and navy lieutenants. NCIS is called in to investigate the deaths. Both hands are missing on one of the lieutenants, making it look like a professional hit. While collecting evidence, DiNozzo discovers a bomb under the car, which explodes close to the team, making Gibbs believe someone is after them.

Abby cannot identify the C-4 used in the bomb, and Director Morrow indicates there may be other factors involved. Gibbs later meets Ari Haswari, a double agent for the FBI with whom he has had complications previously. FBI agent Fornell is called in to inform Gibbs about Ari's mission in the US, and together with Director Morrow, he tells Gibbs not to interfere with the mission.

Because of the history between Gibbs and Ari, Director Morrow places Gibbs under protective custody under the lead of ex-Secret Service agent Todd. The investigation continues, leading to the discovery of a missing target drone from the workplace of one of the dead pilots. Gibbs is sure Ari is behind the deaths and forces Fornell to locate him. Ari's location reveals he is not a double agent, but the one who runs the terrorist cell.

The team figures out Ari's location and is attacked by several terrorists. The drone is on the top of the building, and one finger from the dead pilot's hand is used to launch the drone. McGee tries to take control over the drone while Gibbs, Todd, and DiNozzo takes the terrorists down. One terrorist ambushes the team and shoots at Gibbs. Todd protects him, and she is hit by the bullet. The bullet proof vest she wears stops her from being hurt. She gets up and the team relaxes and jokes with each other. DiNozzo tells Todd that she did good, pleasantly surprising her, and she says, "Wow, I thought I'd die before I ever heard a complim–", when a lone bullet suddenly emerges from out of nowhere and rips through her head, killing her instantly. Ari is revealed to be the murderer, shown behind a sniper rifle on top of a nearby building. Gibbs and DiNozzo are absolutely stunned. DiNozzo's face is covered in a splash of Kate's blood, and Gibbs points his gun into the distance, knowing Ari was the shooter.

== Production ==
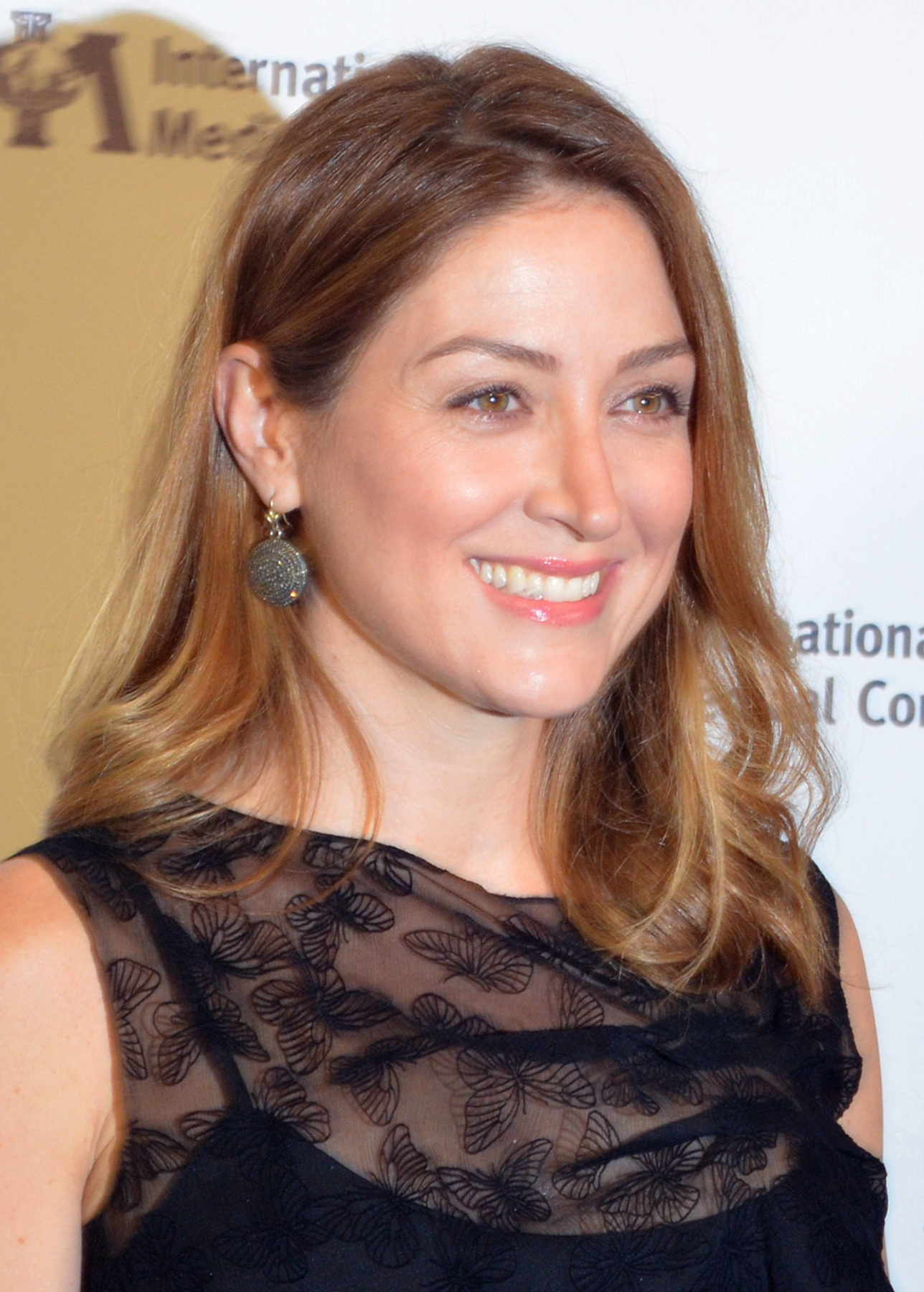
Sasha Alexander's character Kate Todd was killed in the episode.

The episode is written by John Kelley and directed by Thomas J. Wright.

Executive producer Donald P. Bellisario got the message about Sasha Alexander wanting to leave the show when he was writing the episode "SWAK". "This was the first time she went over a year on a show," says Bellisario of Alexander, "and she just didn't think she had the stamina to do it." He added, "Any time you kill a regular character on a show after it's gone at least two full seasons and people have come to love the character, it's bound to have a ripple effect. I had already started writing the last episode of the season and was getting ready to go to Australia to take a little break. Sasha came in two days before I was to leave, and with tears in her eyes, she said, 'I just can't work this hard.'" Later, he said of his response, "I told her, 'All right, then I'm going to kill you.' She was taken aback."

"Do I regret leaving? I absolutely don't, for a million reasons that I've never spoken out about ... for a million reasons that I can't. I had a wonderful time doing it for two years, though," Alexander stated in an interview by Jay Bobbin.

Before the episode aired, it was known one of the main characters would die. Bellisario reportedly filmed two endings to keep the identity of the character a secret, and Mark Harmon jokingly remarked, "We're all personally hoping it's us, because we're all so tired, we're hoping we're going to get killed." During the episode, other characters also did face threats to their lives. Both Tony and Gibbs were in real danger, which kept the viewers unsure about who would die. "It was one of the best kept secrets," according to producer Mark Horowitz. The producers wanted to mark the departure of Alexander with a bang. "That didn't just happen" was the response they wanted from the viewers. Bellisario remarked, "In reality, things like that happen in NCIS. People die, and I wanted to make this death really impactful when it happened."

Four characters are recurring in this episode. Brian Dietzen as Medical Assistant Jimmy Palmer, Joe Spano as Senior FBI Agent Tobias Fornell, Alan Dale as NCIS Director Thomas Morrow, and Rudolf Martin as rogue agent Ari Haswari. Haswari was previously seen in the season one episodes "Bête Noire" (as an unnamed intruder) and "Reveille".

== Reception ==
"Twilight" was seen by 14.74 million live viewers following its broadcast on May 24, 2005. The loss of agent Todd was received as a shock by fans, and series creator Bellisario had to point out it was Alexander's own choice to leave the show.

Before, the press had shown little interest about NCIS, but with the death of one of the main characters, the situation became different. The reruns in the summer also got high numbers of viewers, which the producers explained to be because of the press cover in the aftermath of agent Todd's death.

Julian Spivey from Examiner.com included "Twilight" in his January 2012 compilation of the "10 greatest episodes of 'NCIS'", saying,

Going into the season two finale of NCIS we all knew that one of the main cast members was going to be killed ... but we didn't know how and we didn't know who. This premise led to the most nerve-wracking and intense episode of television that I believe I've ever seen and certainly is one of the greatest TV episodes of all time. After about 58 and a half minutes into the episode, we still didn't know who would perish or how. Gibbs and his team of Tony DiNozzo, Kate Todd and Timothy McGee were all in a building taking enemy fire, while at the same time trying to stop a missile from blowing up a ship. McGee successfully stops the missile, but Gibbs, DiNozzo and Todd are still taking fire on top of the roof, when a shooter attempts to kill Gibbs. Todd jumps in front of Gibbs, saving his life, but was saved by her bulletproof vest. After Gibbs and DiNozzo help her to her feet a bullet from a sniper rifle, fired by the terrorist Ari Haswari, pierces through her forehead killing her instantly as a stunned Gibbs and DiNozzo look on. Almost seven full years later this is still maybe the most riveting ending to a television episode and season that I've ever seen.
