= The Last Big Thing =

1996 film

The Last Big Thing is the debut indie feature film from Writer/Director/Actor Dan Zukovic, featuring an important early role by Mark Ruffalo. It also starred Dan Zukovic and Sibel Ergener.

== Critical reception ==
The Last Big Thing premiered at the Vancouver International Film Festival in 1996 and went on to play at other festivals including the Hamptons International Film Festival, Palm Springs International Film Festival, Denver Film Festival, Boston Film Festival, Austin Film Festival, Gen Art Film Festival, Galway Film Fleah, and the Umea Film Festival. The film received a US theatrical release in 1998 through Stratosphere Entertainment, and was sold to SHOWTIME, playing numerous times on all Showtime channels since 2000.

Cited as "the most important and overlooked indie film of the 90's" by Chris Gore in Film Threat, the film was also called "a distinctly original and brilliant work" by Kevin Thomas in the Los Angeles Times and "a satire whose sharpest moments echo the tone of a Nathanial West novel" by Stephen Holden in the New York Times. Ken Eisner in Variety characterized the film as "a consistently funny, relentlessly scabrous critique of fin-de-siecle media culture" and John Hartl in the Seattle Times called it "one of the few truly original low budget comedies of recent years." Justine Elias of the Village Voice went on to say "this furiously original movie could become the Repo Man of the '90s".
