= Vader Immortal: A Star Wars VR Series =

2019 video game series

- Director: Ben Snow
- Writer: David S. Goyer
- Platforms: Oculus Rift, Oculus Rift S, Oculus Quest, Oculus Quest 2, PlayStation VR
- Release: Oculus Quest, Oculus Rift; Episode I: May 21, 2019; Episode II: September 25, 2019; Episode III: November 21, 2019; PSVR; August 24, 2020

Vader Immortal: A Star Wars VR Series is a series of three virtual reality adventure games originally released on May 21, September 25, and November 21, 2019, respectively, for the Oculus Quest and Rift systems. A PlayStation VR version was later released on August 24, 2020.

The story, split up into three chapters, follows a Force-sensitive smuggler taken captive by Darth Vader, who requires the smuggler to find an ancient artifact.

== Gameplay ==
The game is composed of three chapters, with each one focusing on the usage of different abilities. Each episode includes a dojo which allows players to practice against waves of enemies using a lightsaber and Force powers.

The player follows a linear path through the game, able to use the Force to do various things as necessary to move forward to the next area.

== Synopsis ==
The series, taking place between the events of Revenge of the Sith and Rogue One, follows a Force-sensitive smuggler, a descendant of the famous Lady Corvax, who is taken captive by Darth Vader (Scott Lawrence). Vader requires the smuggler to gain access to the Bright Star, an ancient artifact that once destroyed nearly all life on Mustafar. Aided by his droid ZO-E3 (Maya Rudolph), the Mustafarian loremaster Vylip F'alma (Keith Ferguson), Corvax's husband Black Bishop (David Sobolov), and a Mustafarian priestess (Folake Olowofoyeku), the smuggler goes on a journey through Mustafar, learning lightsaber combat and harnessing his Force powers along the way, before facing off against the cybernetic Imperial admiral Gable Karius (Steve Blum) and Vader himself, who seeks to use the Bright Star to bring back Padmé Amidala (Natalie Portman). (Note: through archive audio)

== Development ==
All three chapters were written by writer David S. Goyer and directed by special effects artist Ben Snow. According to Snow, the premise of searching for an ancient artifact was inspired by the film Raiders of the Lost Ark.

== Reception ==
Reception

Aggregate score
Aggregator	Score
Metacritic	69/100

Review score
Publication	Score
Jeuxvideo.com	15/20

Metacritic, which uses a weighted average, assigned the PlayStation 4 version a score of 69 out of 100, based on 20 critics, indicating "mixed or average reviews". Critics praised the game's story, but criticized the gameplay as not being mechanically deep.

=== Sales ===
Vader Immortal: A Star Wars VR Series was the 8th most-downloaded PlayStation VR game in the United States and Canada, and the 9th in Europe in 2020. In 2021, it ranked 7th in the United States and Canada, and 9th in Europe. In 2025, all three episodes of Vader Immortal featured among the best-selling titles on the Meta Quest platform of all time.

== Awards ==
The first game of the series, Episode I, received the inaugural PGA Innovation Award at the 31st Producers Guild of America Awards.
