= NCIS backdoor pilot =

"Ice Queen" and "Meltdown"
- JAG episodes
- Episode nos.: Season 8 Episodes 20 & 21
- Directed by: Donald P. Bellisario ("Ice Queen"); Scott Brazil ("Meltdown")
- Written by: Donald P. Bellisario & Don McGill
- Original air dates: April 22, 2003 ("Ice Queen"); April 29, 2003 ("Meltdown")

Guest appearances
- Mark Harmon as Leroy Jethro Gibbs; Michael Weatherly as Anthony DiNozzo; Robyn Lively as Vivian Blackadder; Pauley Perrette as Abby Sciuto; Alan Dale as Thomas Morrow; Zoe McLellan as Jennifer Coates; Faran Tahir as Amad Bin Atwa; David McCallum as Donald Mallard; Tom Jay Jones as Don Dobbs ("Ice Queen"); Tamlyn Tomita as Tracy Manetti ("Ice Queen"); Jade Carter as Sergei Zhukov ("Ice Queen"); William Francis McGuire as Scout Leader ("Ice Queen"); W.K. Stratton as Ted Lindsey ("Meltdown"); Alicia Coppola as Faith Coleman ("Meltdown"); Michael Muhney as Jack McBurney ("Meltdown"); Nanci Chambers as Loren Singer ("Meltdown"); Paul Norwood as Judge ("Meltdown"); Joseph Hodge as Merchant Seaman ("Meltdown"); Vyto Ruginis as Agent Dawkins ("Meltdown")

Episode chronology
← Previous "Second Acts"	Next → "Lawyers, Guns, and Money"
- JAG season 8

"Ice Queen" and "Meltdown" are two episodes of the American legal drama television series JAG, that constitute the backdoor pilot for the American crime drama television series NCIS. The episodes aired as the twentieth and twenty-first episodes of the eighth season of JAG, and the 178th and the 179th episodes overall. Both episodes were written by Donald P. Bellisario and Don McGill. "Ice Queen" was directed by Bellisario and originally aired on CBS on April 22, 2003, while "Meltdown" was directed by Scott Brazil and originally aired one week later, on April 29, 2003.

Mark Harmon, Michael Weatherly, Robyn Lively, Pauley Perrette, Alan Dale, Zoe McLellan, Faran Tahir, and David McCallum guest-starred in both episodes as Leroy Jethro Gibbs, Anthony DiNozzo, Vivian Blackadder, Abby Sciuto, Thomas Morrow, Jennifer Coates, Amad Bin Atwa, and Donald Mallard, respectively. Harmon, Weatherly, Perrette, Dale, and McCallum all went on to play the same characters in NCIS. Alicia Coppola, who guest-starred in "Meltdown" as Faith Coleman, also reprised her role in NCIS.

"Ice Queen" follows the NCIS team, led by Special Agent Gibbs, as they investigate the murder of Lieutenant Loren Singer and ultimately arrest Commander Harmon Rabb as their prime suspect. "Meltdown" shows Rabb's trial and the continued investigation by the NCIS team to find the real culprit. The subplot for both episodes involves the NCIS also working to prevent terrorist attacks. "Ice Queen" was watched live by 13.8 million viewers, while "Meltdown" was watched by 13.6 million viewers.

== Plot ==
=== "Ice Queen" ===
While chasing after a stray arrow into the forest, a young Boy Scout finds the arrow has landed in a corpse. NCIS agents Leroy Jethro Gibbs, Vivian Blackadder, and Anthony DiNozzo arrive on the scene and meet up with NCIS Medical Examiner Dr. Donald Mallard who informs them that the corpse is that of a pregnant Navy Lieutenant. DiNozzo determines she is a JAG, while Gibbs determines that she washed up from the nearby river.

At the JAG headquarters, Admiral A. J. Chegwidden informs his team that the NCIS has found the body of a Navy Lieutenant, who is believed to be five months pregnant. The team is unable to get in contact with Lieutenant Loren Singer, who is almost nine months pregnant, so they are told that the NCIS plans to use DNA to confirm if the body is Singer's. Commander Harmon Rabb leaves the room causing Chegwidden to wonder aloud if there is something going on between Rabb and Singer.

NCIS Director Thomas Morrow and his team go to the MTAC, where they watch as other NCIS agents successfully capture Amad Bin Atwa. Meanwhile, Dr. Mallard determines that the body is Singer's and was dumped in the river at the top of the falls after being hit with a metal object.

At JAG headquarters, Chegwidden tells his team what the NCIS has found. Chegwidden privately asks Rabb how he is involved with the murder and thinks that Rabb might know who the father of Singer's baby is. Gibbs and Blackadder question everyone except for Rabb, who calls his half-brother Sergei Zhukov to tell him about Singer's death.

DiNozzo finds Singer's car and determines which bridge Singer was thrown off of and gives the evidence he collected to Forensic Scientist Abby Sciuto, who finds Rabb's fingerprint in the car. Dr. Mallard determines that Singer has been dead for three months, Sciuto learns that she called Zhukov before she died, and Special Agent Don Dobbs finds a Navy Commander's hat near the crime scene. After looking up Zhukov's file, they learn about Zhukov and Rabb being brothers. Gibbs interrogates and arrests Rabb, as he believes that Zhukov is the father of Singer's baby and that Rabb killed Singer to cover for his half-brother.

=== "Meltdown" ===
Rabb meets with Lieutenant Commander Faith Coleman, who has been assigned as his legal counsel, while Gibbs meets with Major Jack McBurney, who will be arguing against Rabb. Morrow tells Gibbs that he needs him to interrogate Bin Atwa as soon as possible. Sciuto, Dr. Mallard, and Gibbs all testify and Gibbs admits that he no longer believes Rabb killed Singer.

Gibbs, Coleman, and McBurney meet with Sciuto, who tells them that the hat Dobbs found belongs to Rabb. Gibbs interrogates Bin Atwa and uses information Blackadder received from the FBI to get him to reveal information about the location of terrorist Hussan Mohammed. Meanwhile, Abby determines that the hat was planted at the scene recently.

With Gibbs busy on the Bin Atwa case, DiNozzo and Blackadder continue the case without him and learn that Singer regularly met with a man for dinner. Using information from restaurant employees and the JAG security logs, they determine that the man was Commander Ted Lindsey, who Rabb recalls stole his hat. While DiNozzo interrogates him, Lindsey claims that it was an accident and Singer fell off the bridge, but DiNozzo tells him that Singer was thrown off the bridge.

DiNozzo and Blackadder meet up with Gibbs and tell him that Lindsey admitted to everything. They then go with Gibbs to capture Mohammed. They are successful, but Mohammed saw Blackadder and nearly killed Gibbs with a grenade.

== Production ==
=== Development ===
In January 2003, it was announced that a JAG spin-off centering on the Naval Criminal Investigative Service was in development. It was also revealed that the spin-off would be introduced in an episode of JAG and would contain a new cast. JAG creator Donald P. Bellisario had been considering a series about the Naval Criminal Investigative Service for a few years before pitching it to the CBS Television president at the time, Les Moonves, in 2002. Bellisario pitched the series to Moonves as "JAG meets CSI" with a gruff NCIS agent and his squad. In May 2003, CBS picked up NCIS, which premiered with "Yankee White" in September 2003.

=== Casting ===
In March 2003, Mark Harmon was cast in the lead role as Leroy Jethro Gibbs. Bellisario was initially hesitant about the casting, but changed his mind after seeing Harmon as Secret Service Agent Simon Donovan on The West Wing. Later that month, Michael Weatherly was cast as Anthony DiNozzo. Pauley Perrette and David McCallum were later cast as Abby Sciuto and Donald Mallard, respectively. Robyn Lively was cast as Vivian Blackadder the day before the episodes began filming. Lively was not retained when NCIS premiered due to the producers feeling that she was too soft for the type of role and would be replaced by Sasha Alexander, who played a new character, Caitlin Todd. "Meltdown" also introduced two new JAG characters.

== Reception ==
=== Viewing figures ===
"Ice Queen" was watched live in the United States by 13.8 million viewers, making it the third most watched show of the night in terms of number of viewers. It was the third most watched show of the night in terms of 18–49 rating, with a 9.3, and in terms of ratings share, with a 15. It was behind American Idol and Judging Amy in all three categories. "Meltdown" was watched live in the United States by 13.6 million viewers, making it the second most watched show of the night in terms of number of viewers, behind only American Idol. It was the third most watched show of the night in terms of 18–49 rating, with a 9.1, and in terms of ratings share, with a 14, behind American Idol and Judging Amy in both categories.

=== Critical response ===
Greg Braxton of the Los Angeles Times said "The episodes ... are lighter in tone, sprinkled with black humor and a grisly quality that recalls CSI."
