= NCIS season 2 =

Season of television series

NCIS
- Season 2
- Season 2 U.S. DVD cover
- Starring: Mark Harmon; Sasha Alexander; Michael Weatherly; Pauley Perrette; Sean Murray; David McCallum
- No. of episodes: 23

Release
- Original network: CBS
- Original release: September 28, 2004 – May 24, 2005

Season chronology
- ← Previous; Season 1 Next → Season 3

The second season of the police procedural drama NCIS was originally broadcast between September 28, 2004, and May 24, 2005, on CBS. With the episode "Lt. Jane Doe", the show also introduced the phoofs, a black and white "preview" which was shown at the beginning of each act of that episode and has continued to be used to this day.

Norfolk Case Agent Timothy McGee, as portrayed by Sean Murray, joined the cast and was promoted to a full-time field agent, transferring to NCIS HQ in Washington to work with the Major Case Response Team, while Sasha Alexander exited the series following the finale "Twilight", where her character Caitlin Todd was shot and killed by Ari Haswari.

== Cast and characters ==
=== Main ===
- Mark Harmon as Leroy Jethro Gibbs, NCIS Supervisory Special Agent (SSA) of the Major Case Response Team (MCRT) assigned to Washington's Navy Yard
- Sasha Alexander as Caitlin Todd, NCIS Special Agent
- Michael Weatherly as Anthony DiNozzo, NCIS Senior Special Agent, Second in Command of MCRT
- Pauley Perrette as Abby Sciuto, Forensic Specialist for NCIS
- Sean Murray as Timothy McGee, NCIS Probationary Special Agent
- David McCallum as Dr. Donald "Ducky" Mallard, Chief Medical Examiner for NCIS

=== Recurring ===
- Alan Dale as Thomas Morrow, NCIS Director
- Alicia Coppola as Faith Coleman, JAG Commander
- Joe Spano as Tobias Fornell, FBI Senior Special Agent
- Jessica Steen as Paula Cassidy, NCIS Senior Special Agent
- Rudolf Martin as Ari Haswari, rogue Mossad Agent
- Brian Dietzen as Jimmy Palmer, Assistant Medical Examiner for NCIS and temporary replacement for Gerald after he gets shot
- Nina Foch as Victoria Mallard, Ducky's mother
- Troian Bellisario as Sarah McGee, Tim McGee's sister
- Tamara Taylor as Cassie Yates, NCIS Special Agent

== Episodes ==
No. overall	No. in season	Title	Directed by	Written by	Original release date	Prod. code	U.S. viewers (millions)
24	1	"See No Evil"	Thomas J. Wright	Chris Crowe	September 28, 2004	201	14.33
When the eight-year-old blind daughter Sandy (played by Abigail Breslin) and wife Jill of a Navy Captain (David Keith) are kidnapped by a mysterious hacker to blackmail him into transferring $2 million in government funds, Gibbs and his team are faced with a unique challenge. An unexpected twist is uncovered when Abby and McGee manage to trace the money. After helping them solve the case, McGee who was on a brief transfer from Norfolk gets a surprise from Gibbs: he is promoted to a full-time field agent and as a result is transferred to the Navy Yard, becoming a permanent member of Gibbs' team in the process.
25	2	"The Good Wives Club"	Dennis Smith	Gil Grant	October 5, 2004	202	14.28
The mummified remains of a woman wearing a wedding dress are found in an abandoned Marine home at the Norfolk station that was due to be torn down after being condemned. When Gibbs and his team go to investigate, they discover that the room the victim was in is modeled on the 1950s which leads Kate to suspect that a serial killer, one who she profiles endured horrific abuse as a child is responsible for the crime. In the search for answers, McGee uncovers a missing person's report, this one in Jacksonville regarding a petty officer who had vanished on her way to work and who has been missing for four months. The team then head to the Base and begin working with the NCIS Special Agent there in the hope of finding the missing officer before it is too late and to also stop the killer once and for all.
26	3	"Vanished"	James Whitmore Jr.	George Schenck & Frank Cardea	October 12, 2004	203	14.86
A marine attack helicopter is discovered in the middle of a crop circle on the outskirts of the rural community of Smokey Corners, West Virginia. The team uncovers a decade-long feud that has deeply divided the town as some of the locals are going to great lengths to hide secrets that could help solve the case and that the missing pilot may have some "unfinished business" to take care of. After days of tracking the pilot down to no avail, Gibbs realizes that they must change tactics. Time is running out as the team must find the missing pilot quickly before tragedy strikes.
27	4	"Lt. Jane Doe"	Dan Lerner	Teleplay by : Steven Long Mitchell & Craig W. Van Sickle & Donald P. Bellisario & Gil Grant; Story by : Steven Long Mitchell & Craig W. Van Sickle	October 19, 2004	204	14.05
While on leave, two sailors discover the body of a young woman dressed in a Navy uniform and due to the fact that she has no ID on her is given the name, Lt. Jane Doe. However, the case becomes very personal for Ducky when he realizes that it bears a striking resemblance to a similar case that he investigated ten years ago. Concurrently, the petty officer who tended the new crime scene is a woman McGee knew in the recent past, but her seeming to help the team takes a twist when the new Jane Doe is identified by way of a surprise source.
28	5	"The Bone Yard"	Terrence O'Hara	John C. Kelley	October 26, 2004	205	13.68
The NCIS team attends a crime scene and end up finding multiple remains among the wreckage despite the Army CID originally insisting that the whole event was nothing more than an accident. When one set of remains is revealed to be an FBI agent who was working undercover and who also received a very savage beating before his death, the team realizes that they've stumbled upon a dumping ground which the Italian mob have been using for the last eighteen years to dispose of their victims. The FBI suspect an agency mole is responsible for the exposure and subsequent death of the murdered agent, and it appears as though Fornell is being set up to take the blame for what's going on while the real mole goes undetected. Unwilling to let Fornell take the fall, Gibbs sets out to find the real mole and clear Fornell's name, using tactics that shock his team.
29	6	"Terminal Leave"	Jeff Woolnough	Roger Director	November 16, 2004	206	15.27
When Iraq veteran Lieutenant Commander Michaela "Micki" Shields, is threatened and very nearly killed by a group of terrorists seeking revenge against her for accidentally killing civilians while she was serving in the war, the NCIS team steps in to protect her and her family from further danger. While trying to convince an FBI agent to help them, the team is convinced that they've discovered the bomber but unfortunately, the FBI Agent is more interested in nailing the members of the whole terrorist cell rather than making sure that the family are safe. However, things might not be what they seem when another car bomb nearly kills Tony and Kate during their protection duty of the lieutenant commander. The clock is ticking for the team as they only have days to solve the case before the lieutenant commander is discharged and officially becomes a civilian.
30	7	"Call of Silence"	Thomas J. Wright	Roger Director	November 23, 2004	207	14.71
A former Marine and Medal of Honor recipient Corporal Ernie Yost (in an Emmy-nominated performance by Charles Durning) who fought in World War II confesses to having murdered his friend during the Battle of Iwo Jima while battling against the Japanese. Drawn by the warmth of the veteran, the team become personally involved and reconstruct the fateful night to find out what really happened. During the case, Gibbs enlists the help of a Japanese veteran he befriended.
31	8	"Heart Break"	Dennis Smith	George Schenck & Frank Cardea	November 30, 2004	208	15.65
A Navy commander explodes in his hospital bed after successful surgery, leading McGee to hypothesize that it was spontaneous human combustion. However, the team discovers that he had gained a lot of enemies recently, not least of all a young ensign, who makes himself the prime suspect with some bizarre behavior. Unfortunately they have to find a new suspect when the ensign forces Kate to shoot him and dies as a result. But while analyzing the evidence from the scene of the death, Abby and Tony discover the truth behind the commander's death, and in turn find a new suspect. In the meantime, Ducky develops a soft spot for the doctor who was treating the commander.
32	9	"Forced Entry"	Dennis Smith	Jesse Stern & John C. Kelley	December 7, 2004	209	14.59
A Marine's wife shoots an intruder in self defense when he enters her home during the night and is about to rape her, but things change when Gibbs and the team uncover evidence suggesting that she might have lured her supposed attacker to her home under the guise of a date. When Abby discovers the wife didn't send the messages, the case becomes much stranger than they ever expected.
33	10	"Chained"	Thomas J. Wright	Frank Military	December 14, 2004	210	14.64
Tony goes undercover as an escaped prisoner. He is tasked with sticking to a convict who has information about stolen Iraqi antiques. During the investigation, Tony disappears, and the GPS locator that Abby placed on him is no longer working. After some startling discoveries in the case including information that the convict Tony is accompanying may in fact be a murderer with blood on his hands, the team realize that Tony's life may be in danger and race against time to find him before it's too late. Back at the office, McGee has to deal with the intrusions of the Deputy Secretary of State.
34	11	"Black Water"	Terrence O'Hara	Teleplay by : John C. Kelley & Juan Carlos Coto; Story by : Juan Carlos Coto	January 11, 2005	211	15.40
A Navy officer's body is found in a car pulled from a lake by a celebrity private investigator (Mike Starr). The man had been missing for two years, resulting in a considerable bounty coming up for whoever finds out the truth. The PI now wants to claim the reward posted by the family, but the NCIS team must complete the investigation to find the killer before the money is awarded. The case changes from accidental death to suspected murder when McGee discovers a bullet lodged in the car. The team initially suspect that the dead man's brother may be a prime suspect, but forensic evidence suggests an entirely different scenario.
35	12	"Doppelgänger"	Terrence O'Hara	Jack Bernstein	January 18, 2005	212	14.53
A telemarketer hears a murder while trying to sell a long-distance call package. The team investigates with the help of a team of local homicide detectives whose personalities seem to correspond with that of Gibbs and his team. Each team member discovers different crucial facts about the case, leading to the discovery that the murder may not have been all it seemed to be. When Abby and McGee discover that the dead man was using the Navy computer system for his own financial gain, they consult with the people he worked with to see if they can shed light on who may have wanted him dead. The investigation takes a new turn when the missing Petty Officer is found dead, having been shot at close range.
36	13	"The Meat Puzzle"	Thomas J. Wright	Frank Military	February 8, 2005	213	12.74
After several months, Ducky and Jimmy finally start identifying the bodies in the meat puzzle they have been working on. It is not long before Ducky realizes that the victims all played a part in a trial in which he himself testified: the court case of a would-be medical examiner named Vincent Hanlon. Hanlon was accused of raping and murdering a young Navy lieutenant, and was eventually jailed for eight years as a result, but was killed in a car crash whilst his brother survived it. They soon discover that the dead men were involved in prosecuting the case against Hanlon, and it dawns on Gibbs that Ducky might be the next target. It appears that whoever has already carried out the gruesome killings is out for revenge against those who were involved in the case. Gibbs makes a mistake in assigning only one person to protect two people namely Ducky and his elderly mother, a mistake that leads to Ducky being kidnapped. The team race against time to find him before he ends up dead like the previous victims. When Jimmy and Abby work together and uncover a surprising revelation about Vincent Hanlon, Gibbs leans on Hanlon's brother.
37	14	"Witness"	James Whitmore Jr.	George Schenck & Frank Cardea	February 15, 2005	214	13.40
A beautiful young MIT graduate witnesses a sailor being strangled. Local police doubt her story, but McGee asserts that her account warrants further investigation. When the missing sailor's body is found at another location, the story gains ground. The witness also captivates McGee who, after a sudden twist in the investigation, ends up unknowingly holding the key to solving the case but things turn to tragedy when the young witness is strangled to death.
38	15	"Caught on Tape"	Jeff Woolnough	Chris Crowe & Gil Grant & John C. Kelley	February 22, 2005	215	13.59
A Marine falls off a cliff, and his camera records him falling to his death. The prime suspects are his wife and his best friend with whom he was staying in the camp. Gibbs finds out they had an affair and he tries to persuade them to blame each other. In the meantime, Abby with McGee's help reconstructs the damaged film footage on the camera which reveals a previously dismissed suspect to have been there at the time of the death. Rather than besiege the armed suspect waiting until he tires, Gibbs blows him up.
39	16	"Pop Life"	Thomas J. Wright	Frank Military	March 1, 2005	216	13.68
A dance club bartender wakes up in bed with a dead female petty officer lying next to him and claims this was not the woman he came home with, despite the fact that he was drunk at the time. DNA tests reveal that he was telling the truth, but the team must still work to figure out whether this means that he did not kill the dead woman. The victim's sister and a local corrupt businessman might know more than what they are telling.
40	17	"An Eye for an Eye"	Dennis Smith	Steven Kane	March 22, 2005	217	14.86
When a petty officer working in Intelligence receives a pair of cobalt blue eyeballs in the mail, the NCIS team starts investigating the case. The sailor commits suicide during the investigation and after Abby matches the eyes to a South American girl in a photo with the dead man's lecturer, Kate and Tony must travel to the Triple Frontier destination of Paraguay to discover the disturbing truth.
41	18	"Bikini Wax"	Stephen Cragg	David J. North	March 29, 2005	218	14.27
A beautiful Virginia Beach bikini contestant drowns in a public bathroom toilet. When the team discover she posed partially naked in a magazine, and was pregnant at the time of her death, they begin to look for the father. Love letters trace to a paroled prisoner, and when a former cellmate offers information, Tony discovers they both are part of the same fraternity and irritates Kate when the two men bond. The photos were revealed to have been taken by her best friend's husband, who kept quiet because his wife is incredibly insecure and constantly examines his every move, even going through his phone and email. Whilst the husband is being interrogated over his involvement in her death, a slip of the tongue leads Gibbs to the real killer. At the end of the episode, having enjoyed reminiscing about his past, Tony and his old frat buddies journey to Panama City for Spring Break, where he finds a juicy secret from Kate's past.
42	19	"Conspiracy Theory"	Jeff Woolnough	Frank Military	April 12, 2005	219	13.89
Gibbs and his team are called to investigate a possible crime when a petty officer named Jessica Smith reveals that she was attacked by a man wearing battle fatigues and body armor but there's no such evidence to suggest that it took place. Her therapist Lt. Witten reveals that Smith has paranoid delusions which she believes was triggered by the death of her fiancee in Iraq the month before. Things take a shocking turn when Gibbs and Kate later find Smith dead in her room, having hung herself but Ducky later discovers she was already dead and the hanging was staged. With the help of FBI Special Agent Tobias Fornell, Gibbs and the team find out that she and her colleagues and their CO were embroiled in an ongoing investigation and suspect someone might have tried to silence Jessica. Meanwhile, when Kate reveals a secret of Tonys to humiliate him, he plays his ace by showing her a copy of an embarrassing photo of Kate at a sorority spring break party (which he discovered at the end of the last episode) and uses it as leverage to terrorize her.
43	20	"Red Cell"	Dennis Smith	Christopher Silber	April 26, 2005	220	13.67
A marine is found dead at the local college campus, his neck broken and his friend and fellow marine missing. McGee and Abby discover a trace in the e-mails with several photos of the dead marine and his missing friend with their faces circled and Gibbs finds out that the marine and a group of fellow NROTC students were part of a paintball club. Back at the lab, Abby receives anonymous IMs from a hacker with cryptic messages about the two marines. The missing marine is found dead at an unused construction site, leading the team to suspect the deaths may be result of a competitive paintball game gone wrong, or something else none of the team expected.
44	21	"Hometown Hero"	James Whitmore Jr.	George Schenck & Frank Cardea	May 3, 2005	221	13.55
The executor of a Navy petty officer's Will & Testament discovers the skeletal remains of a missing girl in the dead man's rented storage unit. As the Petty Officer who died in Iraq is up for a Silver Star, it is very important that NCIS determines if he was a murderer within 24 hours or else the Silver Star will be cancelled altogether. Soil samples and further forensics lead Abby to discover that if the petty officer was the killer, he could not have acted alone. Tony and McGee find CCTV footage that suggests the petty officer was entirely innocent. Meanwhile, Tony's car was stolen and he later discovers it was used in a robbery miles away in Tennessee and "featured" on the evening news in a high-speed chase.
45	22	"SWAK"	Dennis Smith	Donald P. Bellisario	May 10, 2005	222	13.58
All hell breaks loose at the NCIS office when Tony opens a mysterious letter containing a small puff of white powder which may be a deadly bacteria. The whole office is put into lockdown and quarantined, leaving only the lab and autopsy operational. Kate and Tony are isolated into a bio-hazard isolation room while McGee and Gibbs are forced to seal themselves in hazmat suits to be able to help. The letter inside tells them that there is a cure, but in order get the cure before a 32-hour time window expires, NCIS must re-investigate an unsolved rape case from four years earlier where all the prime suspects (navy academy seniors) were cleared by DNA. As the time window ticks away, and it becomes clear that one person is infected, Gibbs must find the culprit.
46	23	"Twilight"	Thomas J. Wright	John C. Kelley	May 24, 2005	223	14.74
With Ari Haswari back in the country again and out to kill Gibbs, the team find themselves attempting to stop Ari from completing the task. In the meantime, they also try to find out who killed two off-duty sailors whose deaths might be linked to an upcoming terrorist attack and the theft of a drone from a company. But in the end, it might not be enough as the NCIS team soon find themselves unknowingly paying a high price when one of the main team is brutally murdered in Gibbs and Ari's battle with each other.

== DVD release ==
NCIS: Naval Criminal Investigative Services- The Complete Second Season
Set details		Special features
23 Episodes; 6-Disc Set; English (Dolby Digital 5.1 Surround)		Investigating Season 2; What's New in Season 2; The Real N.C.I.S.; Lab Tour with Pauley Perrette; Like the Special Features on Season 1, these are only available on the Region 1 DVD as the Region 2 DVD only has the episodes, not any of the Special Features.
Release dates
Region 1	Region 2	Region 4
November 14, 2006	October 16, 2006	October 12, 2006
