= Caitlin Todd =

Fictional character

Caitlin "Kate" Todd
- NCIS character
- Caitlin Todd
- First appearance: "Yankee White" (1.01); September 23, 2003
- Last appearance: "Twilight" (2.23); May 24, 2005 (as series regular) "Kill Ari (Part II)" (3.02); September 27, 2005 (as guest star)
- Portrayed by: Sasha Alexander

In-universe information
- Gender: Female
- Occupation: NCIS Special Agent; USSS Special Agent
- Family: Rachel Cranston (sister); 3 brothers
- Nationality: American

Caitlin "Kate" Todd is a fictional character featured in the CBS television drama NCIS portrayed by Sasha Alexander, appearing in 49 episodes of the series. Alexander made her series debut in the episode "Yankee White", before departing the regular cast in the season two finale "Twilight". Alexander was credited as a guest star for her appearances in the season 3 episodes "Kill Ari (Part I)" and "Kill Ari (Part II)," and appeared uncredited as a voice actor during season 8's "A Man Walks Into a Bar". Subsequently, Alexander has appeared in photographs, flashbacks, archive footage, and CGI footage. Her most recent appearance was through archive footage in "Two Steps Back" (season 15).

== Casting ==
Following JAG's "Ice Queen" and "Meltdown", the character of Kate was created to replace that of Vivian Blackadder, because Donald P. Bellisario felt Blackadder actress Robyn Lively was "too soft". Jennifer Aniston was also considered. Alexander credits CBS President Les Moonves with her casting, stating that she "had just finished doing a couple of other series for CBS and he said, 'come do this show'".

== Departure ==
Donald P. Bellisario stated that Alexander departed the series due to a lack of stamina and grueling filming schedule, stating "this was the first time [Sasha] went over a year on a show". Co-star Michael Weatherly noted that he was not informed until February 2005, and only discovered Caitlin would be assassinated when he "saw the special-effects guy attaching a blood pack to [Sasha's] hair". Alexander does not regret leaving the series, "for a million reasons that I’ve never spoken out about … for a million reasons that I can’t". Following Caitlin's death, fans "flooded Internet message boards with angry postings directed at Bellisario", while Bellisario announced that Alexander's replacement would be "a new female lead character [...], quite different from the conservative Agent Todd. A 'European or Australian girl who is very comfortable with her femininity and sexuality'". Chilean actress Cote de Pablo was later cast as Israeli Mossad Officer Ziva David to replace the departed Alexander.

== Personal background ==
Caitlin was born in Indiana, and was the youngest of five children, including three brothers (whom she referred to as "practically psychotic"), and an elder sister (introduced as Rachel Cranston in Season 8 Episode 14 "A Man Walks Into a Bar..."), and was Catholic. She also mentioned having a cousin named Maureen Ingalls.

Prior to joining NCIS, Kate attended college from 1993 to 1994, first studying law, but dropped out after a single year. She felt like she had spent "10 years in prison". In 1994, she won a wet T-shirt contest during her Spring Break vacation in Panama City Beach, Florida. Anthony "Tony" DiNozzo used a photograph of this as a source of amusement and possible blackmail in "Conspiracy Theory". Some time after college, she joined the United States Secret Service, and was eventually assigned to the President's security detail aboard Air Force One. Viewing her job as very demanding, she didn't have the time to meet someone outside of work, and started a romantic relationship with the Marine assigned as carrier of the presidential "Nuclear Football", Timothy Kerry, thereby breaking the Secret Service's rules which prohibit relationships between colleagues. Kate first encounters Gibbs' team as a United States Secret Service special agent assigned to the Presidential Protection Detail on Air Force One.

== Storylines ==
During "Yankee White", Kate resigned from the Secret Service after disobeying fraternization rules; NCIS Special Agent Leroy Jethro Gibbs recruited Todd soon after and assigned her to his team, pairing her with Anthony DiNozzo. She quickly became a key member of the Gibbs-led Major Case Response Team (MCRT) based at the NCIS headquarters in Washington, D.C. Todd became the team's dedicated profiler and created psychological profiles on the suspects being investigated. She was first taken aback by NCIS' apparent disregard for the rules, but eventually she would work outside the rules with the rest of her team. In the episode "A Weak Link", for example, she suggests they hack into a classified database. Todd's other skills include counterfeit bill analysis and protection detail, which she acquired during her time as a USSS Agent. Kate would sometimes get emotionally invested in cases as seen in the episodes "The Immortals" and "Left for Dead", during which she befriends a Jane Doe (Sherilyn Fenn) suffering memory loss after being buried alive. Todd had an opportunity to kill Ari when he broke into the NCIS autopsy lab in "Bête Noire" and took Gerald and Ducky hostage, but was unable to do so. Gibbs later chastized her for this.

Her attitude contrasted vastly with DiNozzo's behavior, and they routinely argued over matters of privacy and personal boundaries. Throughout the first two seasons Todd was the prime target of DiNozzo's teasing, with him going through her purse, cellphone, PDA and desktop computer on a regular basis. DiNozzo went through Kate's trash to discover where she had eaten breakfast, much to her chagrin in "Doppelganger". Whereas Todd considered this outrageous and unacceptable, DiNozzo seemingly merely did this for his personal entertainment. Conversely, DiNozzo is also the target of numerous taunts and regular teasing from Todd. It is revealed in "Witness" that Kate had a phobia of going to the dentist but she eventually overcame it thanks to Tony giving her the number of a hypnotist.

A talented sketch artist, she sketches an accurate likeness of a suspect in the episode "Marine Down". During the same episode, it was shown that she had drawn caricatures of the team, some of which showed DiNozzo lusting after a pretty girl, and NCIS forensic scientist Abby Sciuto as a bat. She also drew one of Gibbs, but managed to take her drawing pad back from DiNozzo before he revealed it. In season three, when Ziva David joined the team full-time and moved into Todd's cubicle, she presented Gibbs with Todd's sketch pad. There were portraits of each cast member in it, including Gibbs. McGee later finds one of Kate's sketches in his desk during season thirteen.

In addition to being excellent at drawing, Todd, like Abby, was greatly skilled in using a Personal digital assistant or a PDA. Kate's first PDA was destroyed during a practice test at the shooting range at the beginning of Season 1 episode "Marine Down" after Gibbs taped it onto her target to force her to shoot accurately. She was later seen using a possible replacement in Season 1 episode "Eye Spy" and was always seen with one at various crime scenes, usually giving Gibbs and the team information. Despite being seen writing things with her right hand, Todd was seen operating her computer mouse with her left hand, suggesting that she may be ambidextrous. She also told Gibbs and DiNozzo during "Eye Spy" that despite being right handed, she played golf left handed, yet swung a bat and threw balls using her right hand.

=== Death ===
Todd was assassinated during the season two episode "Twilight", after she and the team had successfully cleared a warehouse housing a known terrorist cell. After being officially relieved of the protection detail she had been assigned by Tom Morrow, Kate is shot in the head by sniper and Mossad double-agent Ari Haswari.

In "Kill Ari", it is revealed that he targeted and killed Kate merely because he wanted to cause Gibbs pain (even using a Bravo 51 nicknamed "Kate"). During an imagined discussion with Dr. Donald "Ducky" Mallard in the morgue, Todd, who had been shot dead in the previous episode, explained that she had not been able to kill Ari because she had looked into his eyes and that there had been something kind in them. She also expressed regret at not killing Ari when she had the chance because she did not deserve to die. Seeking vengeance, Gibbs began a manhunt for Ari, who is eventually shot by his own half-sister, Mossad officer Ziva David. Kate's funeral is held in Indiana during "Kill Ari (Part II)". She is laid to rest with civilian honors, after she is posthumously awarded the Presidential Medal of Freedom at the behest of Gibbs and Director Jennifer Shepherd.

=== Legacy ===
Kate has remained a significant part of the NCIS universe in the years following Alexander's final episode ("Kill Ari Part II"). In "Mind Games" (S0303), for example, DiNozzo tells Special agent Timothy McGee to ask Todd whether they have knee pads or not before recalling she is dead, while suspect Kyle Boone uses Todd's death in an attempt to intimidate Gibbs. In "Probie" (S03E10), McGee states that unlike Todd, he had no previous law enforcement experience before enlisting as a NCIS Special Agent, while in "Bait" (S03E18) a teenage student held his classmates hostage inside a classroom by threatening them with a bomb strapped to his chest. Gibbs and his team arrived on scene but were unable to get audio and video of the situation inside the classroom. Gibbs put himself in danger by offering himself as a hostage. While DiNozzo took charge of the team, the boy demanded that his mother be brought to the classroom by sunset, but the team discovered that she had been dead for a year. DiNozzo let Gibbs know by saying to the student that Special Agent Caitlin Todd was looking for his mother. A marine asked how Gibbs would know that the boy's mother was deceased. DiNozzo replied, "Special Agent Todd is dead." In "Hiatus, Part II" (S03E24) When Gibbs loses his memory Ziva reminds Gibbs of Todd's murder and of Ziva killing Ari before taking Gibbs' hand and using it to slap herself on the back of the head.

During season four, Gibbs accidentally called Ziva "Kate" after returning to NCIS following his temporary retirement. Todd is also mentioned briefly by Dr. Mallard in "Aliyah" (S06E25). During "Truth or Consequences" (S07E01), Tony states that the third member of team Gibbs is deceased, and for the past four years that position has been filled by Ziva David. In "Patriot Down" (S07E23), following the murder of SSA Lara Macy, Tony inquires as to who killed "another female NCIS agent", referencing Kate's passing. Kate's sister, Dr Rachel Cranston, was introduced during "A Man Walks Into a Bar..." (S08E14), in which she was conducting mandatory psychological evaluation of the MCRT. Flashbacks of archive footage, alternate takes and deleted scenes including one from the Season 2 episode, "An Eye for an Eye", are used for illustrating the memories of Gibbs, DiNozzo, Sciuto, Dr. Mallard, McGee and Rachel as they remember their deceased friend and sister. A scene where Rachel sleeps behind Todd's former desk mirrors a similar scene with Todd in "Twilight". At the episode's conclusion, Rachel tearfully mentions that the team have been "better than [Rachel] at letting go", revealing her need for closure. Gibbs then takes her to his basement, showing Rachel where Ziva killed Ari, helping her to find closure. Sasha Alexander recorded voice clips for this episode. Later, in "Nature of the Beast" (S09E01) several references to Kate are made, whilst Rachel Cranston is referred to as "Doctor Kate's sister".

During "Life Before His Eyes" (S09E14), an alternate-universe version of Kate is shown in which she was never killed by Ari, is still an NCIS agent, and is married to DiNozzo with a baby girl named Kelly. Her desk is adorned with photographs of her and her husband, whilst her survival means Ziva is still a foreign national. In "Psych Out" (S09E16), Kate is mentioned when her sister returns to NCIS, and in "You Better Watch Out" (S10E10), it is revealed Tony named his goldfish after Kate. The goldfish is featured prominently until season thirteen's "Family First", and plays a significant role in "Whiskey Tango Foxtrot" (S11E01), when DiNozzo has a conversation with Kate regarding Ziva's absence.

In "Gut Check" (S11E09), Abby states that Bishop is an excellent artist, but she's not "Kate good." She later tells Bishop the story of Kate's death in order to prepare her for the news of the death of her own partner. In "House Rules" (S12E10), when McGee is explaining Gibbs' rules, scenes featuring Kate were prominent, and in "Check" (S12E11), Diane Sterling is assassinated in a manner that mirrors Kate's death in order to cause Gibbs significant pain. Kate's "ghost" overlooks Dorneget's funeral procession alongside Shepard, Cassidy, Pacci, Franks, and Dorneget himself in "The Lost Boys" (S12E23). During "Scope" (S13E18), a caricature of McGee drawn by Kate is featured, while when Kate's partner DiNozzo resigns from NCIS in "Family First" (S13E24), a photograph of the two of them is seen among his personal possessions. Kate's Agency ID Photograph and her badge are shown on a memorial wall as Gibbs mourns Ziva.

== Relationships ==
=== Leroy Jethro Gibbs ===
Although they conflicted heavily upon their first meeting in "Yankee White", Todd had a great relationship with Gibbs. Gibbs immediately saw her potential as a special agent and hired her right after she resigned from the Secret Service. Despite difficult beginnings during which Todd resented Gibbs' harshness and rude manners (such as hanging up on her), she had a lot of respect for Gibbs and worked well with him. He was her mentor and believed that she was a great agent; in "Sub Rosa", Gibbs brought Todd with him aboard a U.S. Navy Los Angeles-class attack submarine even though women are considered "problematic" aboard submarines; in order to bring Todd with him, Gibbs didn't hesitate to argue with Norfolk's sub squadron commander.

Keeping with his tendency to know "everything about everyone", Gibbs knew what the tattoo Todd had on her back represented and was apparently the first to identify Dr. Rachel Cranston as Todd's sister in "A Man Walks Into a Bar...".

Confronted with Todd's death, a shocked and vengeful Gibbs found himself overwhelmed with guilt and, like the rest of the protagonists, began having visions of her. His first visions of Todd blamed him for her death and angrily demanded to know why she was killed instead of him, even suggesting that Gibbs should commit suicide. After he avenged her death by having Ari killed, however, he had another vision of her at her funeral in which she seemed to have forgiven him, smiling and jokingly telling him "You're late for my funeral, Gibbs".

=== Anthony DiNozzo ===
Todd's relationship with her co-worker Tony DiNozzo could be referred to as a love-hate relationship as they had arguments usually in various levels of maturity. The two constantly competed, both during training and investigations. Todd was often critical of DiNozzo's behaviour, especially concerning his attitude towards women and his disrespect for personal boundaries; indeed, DiNozzo routinely went through Todd's purse, cellphone, PDA and desktop computer, uncovering personal information such as her dates' identities. In one episode, DiNozzo snuck unbeknownst to her into the bathroom while she was having a shower in order to brush his teeth, which infuriated her when she noticed him; however, it was not uncommon for DiNozzo to be teased and taunted by Todd, especially after DiNozzo kissed a female suspect who was, unbeknownst to him, transgender; their bickering got so bad in the episode "Pop Life" that they sought counseling from Dr. Mallard.

Despite her dislike of Tony's habit of trespassing her privacy, they get along at work, with Tony frequently explaining military slang to her. They also "gang up" against McGee when he first joined the team by letting him do some of the more mundane jobs. In the Season 2 episode "Forced Entry" they tricked McGee into drinking Gibbs' coffee, which is a well-known taboo.He bought her flowers as a peace offering after annoying her in the episode "Vanished".In the episode "The Bone Yard", DiNozzo was almost possessive of Todd when McGee posed the idea of pretending to be Todd's lover to get into a paternity clinic to photograph evidence for Sciuto, saying he would do it instead of McGee; later in the same episode, he told Todd he thought they made a good couple, to which she replied "Maybe for The Jerry Springer Show". In the episode "Black Water", he went close to jealousy when Todd accepted a date offered by the victim's brother. During the events of "My Other Left Foot", DiNozzo was obsessed by the idea of Todd having a tattoo and asked to know where during the whole episode. In extras seen on the Season 2 DVD Box Set, the producers stated it was intended for there to be a relationship between these two characters. When DiNozzo was posing as a criminal in "Chained", Todd showed much concern for his safety. In the episode "SWAK", after Todd was found to be uninfected, she continued to stay with DiNozzo, lying to him about her condition even though she knew that the risk of infection was still imminent. As he was apparently about to die, Todd was devastated and started crying; DiNozzo eventually survived, much to her relief.

Standing with Gibbs and Todd when she was killed, DiNozzo was especially shocked and her death would have a serious impact on him, which along with other events made him "grow up" during the following seasons. As shown in the episodes "Kill Ari" I & II, DiNozzo struggled with sorrow, culminating in a scene in which he and McGee mourn over Todd's dead body in Dr. Mallard's autopsy room. He finally came to terms with her death after her funeral.

After Todd's death, like the other characters, DiNozzo also had a vision of her postmortem. Typical to DiNozzo's chauvinistic personality, Todd appeared in the Catholic schoolgirl uniform that he had been asking about in the episode "Bikini Wax". After telling him that she always knew what he was thinking, she realized that she was wearing the uniform and quickly berated him, saying "Tony, I just died, and you're having a sexual fantasy?" to which he replied, "Can't help it. Sometimes I used to picture you naked" and she responded by screaming in shock seconds before Ziva David was introduced for the first time. This "sexual fantasy" was portrayed after DiNozzo offered to go back out in the pouring rain and find the bullet that killed Todd and became upset when McGee improved the answer he had told to Gibbs. In the Season 8 episode "A Man Walks Into a Bar...", Todd's sister Rachel suggests to DiNozzo that Todd was "hard on [him] because she knew what [he] was really capable of".

In the 200th episode, "Life Before His Eyes", one of several alternate reality scenarios featured Kate surviving, marrying DiNozzo, and having a child with him.

=== Donald "Ducky" Mallard ===
In "Yankee White", Dr. Mallard was the first NCIS member who got along with Todd. The two liked each other very much and genuinely cared for each other, as seen in several episodes including "Reveille" and "The Meat Puzzle".

In the latter, Gibbs assigned Todd as Mallard's protection detail when his life was threatened by a criminal. As he does with other team members, Ducky would usually call Todd by her full name, Caitlin just like her future murderer, Ari Haswari did.

Todd's death was a severe blow to Mallard, who wouldn't let anyone else perform the autopsy on her dead body. Before he started, however, he had a vision of the body speaking to him, declaring she felt she didn't deserve to die. In the Season 8 episode "A Man Walks Into a Bar...", Mallard has a flashback to this vision while speaking to Dr. Rachel Cranston.

=== Abby Sciuto ===
As with Dr. Mallard, Todd and Sciuto got along very well pretty fast, ultimately becoming close friends. They would often make plans together, such as spending the weekend together at a spa.

Also, as seen during "A Weak Link", Abby was seen talking to Kate and asking for advice about her relationship with McGee after he had confessed to Abby that he liked her, leaving her unsure of how to respond to the comment.

Naturally, she was one of the most deeply affected by Todd's death, but regained composure after being cheered up by a post-mortem, goth vision of Todd. She later played a jazz music record at Todd's funeral, as part of her own New Orleans heritage. Nevertheless, she remained affected long after the funeral, and was initially at odds with the newly recruited Ziva David, both because she took Todd's place and because of her affiliation with Todd's murderer Ari Haswari. Some time later, however, they mended fences, becoming best friends.

In the episode "Marine Down", it was revealed that Todd had drawn several caricatures of her teammates, including one of Sciuto as a vampire bat. Todd started to apologize, saying that there was nothing mean in the drawing, only to be interrupted by an overjoyed Sciuto who asked if she could hang it up on her lab's wall. When Kate died, Abby used the drawing as a reminder about her best friend Kate. She would later stare at it while crying in the aftermath of Todd's death in "Kill Ari (Part I)".

=== Timothy McGee ===
When McGee was introduced in "Sub Rosa", Todd protested at DiNozzo's apparent abuse of authority when he ordered McGee to stay on a crime scene until someone else can come to relieve him. Todd and McGee were partnered for a very short time during the episode "UnSEALed", during which he came to her help when she was tied up by a former Navy SEAL.

Throughout Season 2, DiNozzo and Todd would sometimes gang up on McGee to tease him, but Todd generally disapproved of DiNozzo's pranks and hazing of McGee. After the murder of a witness under McGee's watch, Todd was the first to try to comfort him.

After Todd's death, like the grief-stricken rest of the team, McGee had to cope with the loss of a friend, and like DiNozzo would fantasize about her. Later, McGee is shown mourning with DiNozzo over Todd's dead body.
