= Scott Lawrence =

American actor

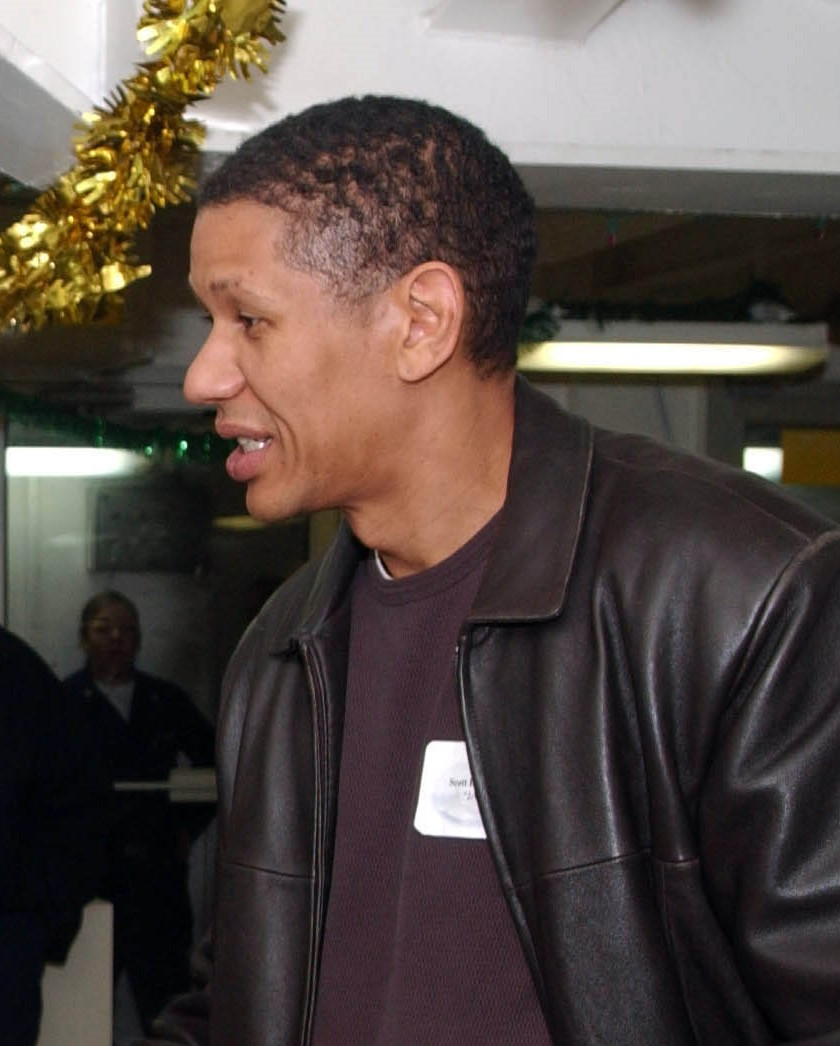
- Lawrence during a visit to the USS Nimitz
- Born: Los Angeles, California, U.S.
- Occupation: Actor
- Years active: 1987–present
- Children: 2

Scott Lawrence is an American actor best known for his role as Cmdr. Sturgis Turner on the CBS series JAG. Lawrence played the role from 2001 until 2005, when the series ended. He is also known for being a major audio double for James Earl Jones, voicing Darth Vader in several Star Wars video games since 1994.

== Career ==
Lawrence began his career in Hollywood in the late 1980s with supporting TV and film appearances. He debuted as a perpetrator defended by James Earl Jones in L.A. Law. He had a recurring role on Murphy Brown and in the early 1990s was a semi-regular on the Whoopi Goldberg series Bagdad Cafe.

In film, his first appearance was in the 1990 thriller The First Power with Lou Diamond Phillips. He next appeared in the Drew Barrymore 1993 horror film Doppelganger. Other credits include the Jean-Claude Van Damme vehicle Timecop and Howard Stern's Private Parts.

From 1994 to 2006, Lawrence voiced Darth Vader in the Star Wars video game series produced by LucasArts. After his performance in Star Wars: Empire at War, he was succeeded by Matt Sloan. Lawrence returned to the role for a number of recent releases, starting with the Vader Immortal VR Series. He also played Vader in the game Star Wars Jedi: Fallen Order in 2019.

In 2011, Lawrence made an appearance in NCIS, a spin-off of JAG in the Season 8 episode, "A Man Walks Into a Bar..." albeit as a different character.

His film appearances include the blockbuster film Avatar and 2010's The Social Network.

In 2019, Lawrence appeared as Special Agent Billy Taggart in the critically acclaimed Netflix series Unbelievable.

In 2020, Lawrence appeared as a guest on the Studio 60 on the Sunset Strip marathon fundraiser episode of The George Lucas Talk Show.

In 2026, Lawrence appeared as Judge Lionel Stone in Season 4 of Lincoln Lawyer on Netflix.

== Selected filmography ==
=== Film ===
Year	Title	Role	Notes
1990	The First Power	Gang Member #2	
1992	Ruby	Dillon	
1993	Doppelganger	Male Nurse	
1994	When the Bough Breaks	Sergeant Footman	
1994	Timecop	George Spota	
1996	Celtic Pride	Ted Hennison	
1997	Turbulence	Felix	
1997	Private Parts	News Guy	
2004	Party Wagon	Lewis Clark Jefferson / Cowpoke #3	Voice
2008	Cloverfield	Lead Soldier	
2009	Avatar	Venture Star Crew Chief	
2010	The Social Network	Maurice	
2012	A Green Story	Eric	
2013	The Host	Doc	
2013	Star Trek Into Darkness	U.S.S. Vengeance Officer	
2014	Into the Storm	Principal Thomas Walker	
2015	Quitters	Todd	
2015	Danny Collins	Dr. Ryan Kurtz	
2015	Equals	Mark	
2019	Stuber	Dr. Branch	

=== Television ===
Year	Title	Role	Notes
1989	Murphy Brown	Man In Elevator (uncredited)	Episode: "I Would Have Danced All Night"
1989	Midnight Caller	Dwight Hoover	Episode: "Take Back the Streets"
1991	Growing Pains	Webster Winslow	Episode: "Not with My Carol You Don't"
1993	Quantum Leap	'Tibby' Johnson	Episode: "Shock Theater: October 3, 1954"
1996	Law & Order	Michael Walters	Episode: "Custody"
2001–2005	JAG	Commander Sturgis Turner	Main cast (seasons 7–10)
2001	The West Wing	Congressional Committee Chair	Episode: "Bad Moon Rising"
2001	Star Trek: Voyager	Garon	Episode: "The Void"
2001	NYPD Blue	Anthony Mackey	Episode: "In the Still of the Night"
2009	American Dad!	Unknown	Voice role; Episode: "Brains, Brains and Automobiles"
2009	The Mentalist	De Shaun Braemer	Episode: "Carnelian, Inc."
2009–2010	24	CDC Director Ben Landry	2 episodes
2011	American Horror Story	Detective Webb	Episode: "Home Invasion"
2015	Fear the Walking Dead	Art Costa	2 Episodes
2016	Rectify	Avery	4 Episodes
2017	Legion	Dr. Henry Poole	3 Episodes
2017	Suits	James Palmer	2 Episodes
2017–2018	Mr. Mercedes	Detective Peter Dixon	Main cast (season 1–season 2 premiere)
2018–2020	Star Wars Resistance	Jarek Yeager	Main cast; voice role
2019	Unbelievable	Billy Taggart	Recurring role
2019	Carol's Second Act	Dr. On Roof	Episode "Blocking"
2022	NCIS: Hawaiʻi	Judge Malcolm Keen	Episode: "The Game"
2024	Sugar	Dr. Vickers	2 Episodes
2024	S.W.A.T.	Kyle Johnson	Episode "Life"
2025	Matlock	Lionel Carlisle	Episode: "Prior Bad Acts"
2025	Paradise	Chairman of the Joint Chiefs General Curtleigh	3 Episodes
2026	The Lincoln Lawyer	Judge Lionel Stone	Recurring cast (season 4: 10 Episodes)
2026	Chicago Med	Spencer Cook	Episode: "Things Left Unsaid"

=== Video games ===
Year	Title	Role	Notes
1993	Ground Zero: Texas	Pike	
1994	Star Wars: TIE Fighter	Darth Vader	Voice
1995	Star Wars: Dark Forces	Darth Vader	
1995	Star Wars: Rebel Assault II: The Hidden Empire	Darth Vader	
1998	Star Wars: Rebellion	Darth Vader	
2000	Star Wars: Force Commander	Darth Vader / Rebel Dignitary #1	Voice
2001	Star Trek: Away Team	Slovaak	Voice
2001	Star Wars: Super Bombad Racing	Darth Vader	Voice
2001	Star Wars: Galactic Battlegrounds	Darth Vader	
2001	Star Wars Rogue Squadron II: Rogue Leader	Darth Vader	
2002	Star Wars Racer Revenge	Darth Vader / Anakin Skywalker	Voice
2003	Star Wars Rogue Squadron III: Rebel Strike	Darth Vader / Transport Captain 2	Voice
2005	Star Wars: Episode III – Revenge of the Sith	Darth Vader	Voice
2005	EverQuest II: Desert of Flames	Unknown	Voice
2005	Star Wars: Battlefront II	Darth Vader	Voice
2006	Star Wars: Empire at War	Darth Vader	
2007	Command & Conquer 3: Tiberium Wars	Unknown	Voice
2008	Command & Conquer 3: Kane's Wrath	Unknown	Voice
2016	Mafia III	Additional voices	
2019	Tom Clancy's The Division 2	General Antwon Ridgeway	Voice
2019	Vader Immortal: A Star Wars VR Series - Episode I	Darth Vader	Voice
2019	Vader Immortal: A Star Wars VR Series - Episode II	Darth Vader	Voice
2019	Vader Immortal: A Star Wars VR Series - Episode III	Darth Vader	Voice
2019	Star Wars Jedi: Fallen Order	Darth Vader	Voice
2020	Star Wars: Squadrons	Darth Vader	Voice
2023	Star Wars Jedi: Survivor	Darth Vader	Voice
