= Yankee White (NCIS) =

- NCIS episode
- Episode no.: Season 1 Episode 1
- Directed by: Donald P. Bellisario
- Written by: Donald P. Bellisario and Don McGill
- Original air date: September 23, 2003

Guest appearances
- Gerry Becker as Secret Service agent William Baer; Joe Spano as senior FBI agent T. C. Fornell; Gary Grubbs as Coroner Elmo Poke; Lawrence Pressman as Secret Service Director; Gregory Itzin as FBI Director; Dane Northcutt as Major Timothy Kerry; Gerald Downey as Commander Ray Trapp; Robert Bagnell as Leonard Rish; Gerald McCullouch as FBI agent; Pancho Demmings as NCIS Medical assistant Gerald Jackson; Michael Adler as Capt. Burger; Steve Bridges as President George W. Bush; Alan Dale as NCIS Director Thomas Morrow

Episode chronology
← Previous —	Next → "Hung Out to Dry"
- NCIS season 1

"Yankee White" is the first episode in the first season of the American crime drama television series NCIS. It first aired on CBS in the United States on September 23, 2003. The episode is written by Donald P. Bellisario and Don McGill and directed by Bellisario. It was seen by 13.04 million viewers.

While on Air Force One, a Navy Commander tasked with carrying the "football" dies under mysterious circumstances, forcing an emergency landing in Wichita, Kansas. While his death is at first thought be to a tragic accident, NCIS eventually uncovers evidence suggesting the commander was murdered and that it might be connected to a possible assassination attempt on the president of the United States.

The episode introduces Caitlin "Kate" Todd (as a replacement for NCIS agent Vivian "Viv" Blackadder, who appears in the NCIS backdoor pilot in JAG), and FBI Agent Tobias Fornell, who will later become a major recurring character of the show. The rest of the team were all introduced in a double episode of JAG season 8, "Ice Queen" and "Meltdown".

The episode title (Yankee White) is the administrative nickname for a background check conducted on Department of Defense personnel working with the president and vice president.

Robert Balkovich says the episode is "a historic moment in the NCIS universe....full of enjoyable character moments and satisfying twists and turns".

== Plot ==
While on Air Force One, U.S. Navy Commander Ray Trapp dies of an apparent stroke after having lunch with the president despite the efforts of the president's doctor and medical team. Trapp had been assigned to temporarily be the carrier of the "football" during the trip, because the regular carrier, Marine Major Timothy Kerry, was sick with the flu. The plane is forced to land in Wichita, Kansas, and the president is flown to his original destination on a backup Air Force One.

The NCIS team arrive to investigate the death, but meet some jurisdictional problems with both the FBI and Secret Service, who both want to take the lead. With Secret Service agent Caitlin Todd grudgingly agreeing to help, NCIS special agents Leroy Jethro Gibbs and Tony DiNozzo, and NCIS medical examiner Donald "Ducky" Mallard examine the body. The local coroner, a friend of Ducky's, manages to stall the FBI long enough for NCIS to hijack the entire crime scene: Tony shuts the door with the FBI agents still outside and, after receiving authorization from Agent Todd, the pilot immediately flies the plane back to Washington.

During the trip, NCIS begin preliminary examinations when Agent Todd suddenly becomes ill. Gibbs is worried she too is infected with whatever killed the Commander, but she explains it is the same flu that Major Kerry had, revealing that she is in a relationship with him which is against fraternization rules. Following the plane to Washington, senior FBI special agent T. C. Fornell makes a deal with Agent Todd's superior, Secret Service agent William Baer, to take control of the investigation and cut out NCIS by ordering Agent Todd to deliver Commander Trapp's body upon landing, as whoever has the body controls the investigation. Despite her protests, Agent Todd follows orders but Gibbs, having suspected such an eventuality, arranged for DiNozzo to take the place of the corpse in the body bag they turn over to the FBI, allowing their escape. NCIS director Thomas Morrow later makes a deal with his counterparts for a three-way investigation with NCIS in the lead (as they possess the body).

Back at the NCIS headquarters at Marine Corps Base Quantico in Virginia, Ducky autopsies the body of Commander Trapp, only to find he suffered a cerebral embolism, which is considered a natural cause of death. Meanwhile, Agent Todd meets Major Kerry for a drink in DC, telling him that their affair must end, and he agrees. When he returns to his car after their meeting, he falls violently ill and dies.

While the team continues its investigation into the death of Commander Trapp, Gibbs and Agent Todd fly to the president's location to accompany him on the return trip to DC aboard the back-up Air Force One. Once aboard the back-up plane, Gibbs begins to irritate Agent Todd by comparing the plane to the 1997 film Air Force One, while learning that she had just seen Major Kerry during her brief stay in DC. Soon afterwards, Major Kerry's corpse is discovered in his car in DC, with similar symptoms to those of Commander Trapp, and his body is taken to the NCIS lab. Meanwhile, NCIS forensic specialist Abby Sciuto has been able to find DMSO and snake venom from an Australian taipan on Commander Trapp's uniform and they quickly find the same toxins on Major Kerry's uniform. DiNozzo learns that Trapp and Kerry used the same dry cleaner and informs Gibbs aboard the back-up Air Force One about Kerry's death and their findings.

After quickly determining that the current "football" carrier isn't in danger, Gibbs interrogates Agent Todd, as she was the last person in contact with both men before they died. Gibbs questions her motive for Commander Trapp's death before revealing that Major Kerry is dead as well. Todd's reaction makes Gibbs believe that she is innocent. NCIS determines that it is a complex terrorist attempt to assassinate the president, and Gibbs realises that Commander Trapp was killed in order to force the president and his team to switch to the backup plane. Todd describes the differences between the backup plane and the main plane, and Gibbs focuses on the armory, which has keyed locks instead of digital keypads. If terrorists are planning an attack, they must have copied the keys.

Aware of the threat, Gibbs checks the armory while Todd protects the president. Gibbs find the armory open, grabs a gun and realizes that one of the journalists aboard is trying to get to the president's quarters in an attempt to kill him. Gibbs confronts the journalist, who attacks him, but Gibbs kills him before any damage is done. At the end of the episode, Agent Baer thanks Gibbs for his hard work, and reveals that Todd has resigned from the Secret Service for breaking fraternization rules. Gibbs then recruits her as an NCIS agent.

== Production ==
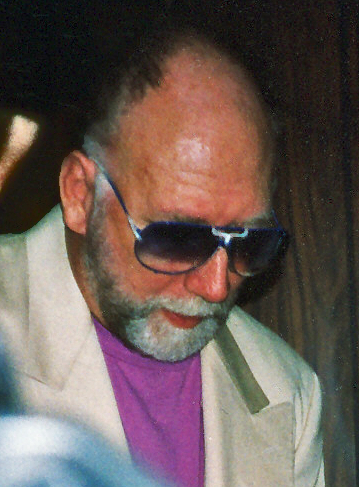
Donald Bellisario co-wrote and directed the episode.

The episode is written by Donald P. Bellisario and Don McGill and directed by Bellisario. According to the DVD commentary, the episode was written as an homage to the 1997 film Air Force One. According to Bellisario, the NCIS pilot episode was easy to sell to CBS because of its low costs compared to the JAG pilot. Together with Billy Webb (Director of Photography), Bellisario wanted to give NCIS a different look than other shows, starting with the first episode of the series. First find out "how would we normally shoot this, now let's figure another way to shoot it". Short clips in between scenes became a trademark. "We moved fast, we jump cut in the middle of scenes, and we jump cut dialogues". "What we ended up with was a completely different shooting style".

In the first pilot episodes (back-door pilot), as a part of JAG, Robyn Lively is seen in the role as NCIS agent Vivian Blackadder. Bellisario stated that "she was a little soft for this kind of role", and is replaced by a new and different character in this episode. Portrayed by Sasha Alexander, Secret Service agent Caitlin Todd is recruited by Gibbs at the end of the episode, filling Blackadder's place at Gibbs's team.

Together with Alexander's character, two recurring characters were introduced. FBI agent Tobias C. Fornell (portrayed by Joe Spano), who still is a part of the series, and medical assistant Gerald Jackson (Pancho Demmings). Jackson departed from the series later in season 1 before returning for one final time in the Season 3 opening episodes, "Kill Ari (Part I)" and "Kill Ari (Part II)".

== Gibbs's rules ==
The first three of Gibbs's rules are revealed:

- No. 1 "Never let suspects stay together."
- No. 2 "Always wear gloves at a crime scene."
- No. 3 "Don't believe what you're told. Double-check."

According to executive producer Shane Brennan, the first three rules is a double set. "When [Gibbs] joined NCIS, Mike Franks told him he didn't need dozens of different rules to be an agent... just three 'golden rules'. This is why we have double ups [...]. Three of them are Gibbs's rules; three of them are Mike Franks's rules". Whether it is Gibbs or Franks's rules shown in the episode, Brennan does not tell.

== Pop culture references ==
Throughout the episode, Gibbs makes various often-humorous references to Harrison Ford and his role in the 1997 film Air Force One. This aspect of Gibbs's portrayal in the episode has become significant to long-time fans of the show given the creative decision to make the character more stoic and "pop-culture-illiterate" in later episodes, as well as the association of extensive film knowledge and quoting with the character of DiNozzo.

"3 years before 9/11, clancy wrote a book where a terrorist hijacked a commercial jetliner and crashed it into the capitol."

— Special Agents Leroy Jethro Gibbs, in Donald P. Bellisario and Don McGill, NCIS S01E01, 33min

References to the 1994 and 1996 novels, Debt of Honor and Executive Orders, written by Tom Clancy where a Japanese pilot crashed a Boeing 747 directly into the U.S. Capitol during a special joint session of Congress.

== Reception ==
"Yankee White" was seen by 13.04 million live viewers following its broadcast on September 23, 2003, with an 8.6/14 share among all households. A share means the percentage of television sets in use tuned to the program.
