= Sibel Galindez =

American actress

Sibel Ergener
- Born: November 25, 1967 (age 58)
- Education: Harvard University
- Occupations: Actress; theatre director
- Years active: 1993–2002
- Known for: JAG; Phoenix
- Spouse: Peter Deacon Galindez (m. 2001)
- Children: 2

Sibel Catherine Galindez née Ergener (born November 25, 1967) is an American actress primarily active from 1993 to 2002. She has starred in range of Films, TV shows and series such as The Last Big Thing, Sliders and Beverly Hills, 90210. She most notably portrayed the role of Lieutenant Elizabeth "Skates" Hawkes and Dixie on the CBS TV Series, JAG. She has also worked as a Performing Arts Director at Portsmouth Abbey School in Portsmouth, Rhode Island. She is a graduate of Harvard University and married an actual US Navy Judge Advocate General (JAG) officer, Peter Galindez, whom she met aboard the USS John C. Stennis in 1999.

== Filmography ==
=== Film ===
Year	Title	Role	Notes
1995	Perfect State of Mind	Jasmine	Short
1995	Dance of the Pendulum	Charlie	
1996	The Last Big Thing	Magda	
1998	Phoenix	Carl's Wife	
1999	Restraining Order	Joan	
1999	The Gifted	Mary	
2000	Mars and Beyond	Lt. Natasha Bekov	

=== Television ===
Year	Title	Role	Notes
1993	The Adventures of Brisco County, Jr.	Ellen (as Sibel Ergener)	Episode: "Showdown"
1995	Beverly Hills, 90210	Travel Agent (as Sibel Ergener)	Episode: "Hello Life, Goodbye Beverly Hills"
1995	Silk Stalkings	Jennifer (as Sibel Ergener)	Episode: "Kill Shot"
1996	The Making of a Hollywood Madam	Amy Fleiss	television film
1996	Hot Line	Forewoman	Episode: "Hung Jury"
1997	Wings	Rhonda	Episode: "House of Blues"
1998	Beyond Belief: Fact or Fiction	Brenda Weaver (segment "The Bridesmaid")	Episode: "Rock & Roll Ears / The Bucket / The Bridesmaid / Voice from the Grave / The Chess Game"
1998	Sliders	Duvall (as Sibel Ergener)	Episode: "Virtual Slide"
2000	The David Cassidy Story	Kay Lenz	television film
1997-2002	JAG	Lt. Elizabeth 'Skates' Hawkes	9 episodes
