= Kittiwake (disambiguation) =

Kittiwake is the name of two species of gull. It may also refer to:

== Aircraft ==
- Saunders Kittiwake, a Saunders Roe flying boat design
- Shapley Kittiwake, a British 1930s gull-wing monoplane
- Mitchell Kittiwake, a British single-engine sporting aircraft

== Boats ==
- Kittiwake 23, an American sailboat design

== Culture ==
- Kittiwake Island, a 1954 opera by Alec Wilder
- The Kittiwakes, a British folk band
- Kittiwake Press, a United Kingdom publisher: see List of publishers

== Places ==
- Kittiwake Coast, a part of the coast of Newfoundland and Labrador
- Kittiwake oil field, an oil field in the North Sea: see List of oil and gas fields of the North Sea

== Ships ==
- Kittiwake, a trawler, converted to the World War II minesweeper USS Curlew (AM-69) of the United States Navy
- Kittiwake, an Irish light-vessel: see Lightvessels in Ireland
- HMS Kittiwake (L30), a Kingfisher-class sloop of the British Royal Navy, a 1930s patrol vessel
- USCGC Kittiwake (WPB-87316), a United States Coast Guard Marine Protector-class coastal patrol boat: see List of United States Coast Guard cutters
- USFS Kittiwake, later US FWS Kittiwake, a fishery patrol vessel in the fleet of the United States Bureau of Fisheries and Fish and Wildlife Service fleets from 1919 to ca. 1945 that previously served in the United States Navy as USS Raeo (SP-588)
- USS Kittiwake (ASR-13), a World War II submarine rescue ship of the United States Navy

== Trains ==
- Kittiwake (60120), a LNER Peppercorn Class A1 British steam locomotive
