= 1967 in aviation =

This is a list of aviation-related events from 1967.

== Events ==
- The Canadian Golden Centennaires aerobatic team is formed and performs all year to celebrate the Canadian Centennial year.
- Boeing opens its biggest factory (largest building by volume), the Boeing Everett Factory, in Everett, Washington.
- Pacific Air Lines launches a controversial marketing campaign devised by advertising executive and comedian Stan Freberg that highlights and spoofs passengers' fear of flying, including a full-page advertisement in the New York Times on April 28. Matthew E. McCarthy, Pacific's chief executive and biggest shareholder, explains the campaign by saying, "It's basically honest. We spoof the passengers' concern, but at least we admit they have it." Philip H. Dougherty, writing in the Business and Finance section of the May 1 edition of The New York Times, describes the advertisements as "rather shocking". After stockholders raise objection to the unorthodox campaign at a May 1967 meeting, two Pacific Air Lines executives resign in the wake of the controversy.

=== January ===
- January 1 – The United States conducts a 48-hour standdown of air operations over Vietnam for the New Year holiday.
- January 2
  - In the biggest air battle to date in the Vietnam War, seven North Vietnamese Mikoyan-Gurevich MiG-21s (NATO reporting name "Fishbed") are destroyed by U.S. Air Force F-4C Phantom II fighters of the 8th Tactical Fighter Wing in Operation Bolo.
  - The contracts for the development of the Boeing SST supersonic transport and its engines are awarded.
- January 8 – Mackey Airlines merges into Eastern Air Lines.
- January 15 – The "Super Sights and Sounds" halftime show at the first AFL-NFL World Championship Game – retroactively dubbed Super Bowl I – at Los Angeles Memorial Coliseum in Los Angeles, California, includes two men who emerge from giant foam footballs flying around the field with jet packs, witnessed by almost 62,000 people in attendance and a television audience of more than 51 million.

=== February ===
- February 1 – Braniff Airways absorbs Pan American-Grace Airways (Panagra).
- February 2 – Pudahuel International Airport opens in Pudahuel, outside Santiago, Chile.
- February 7 – A lone hijacker commandeers a United Arab Airlines Antonov An-24 with 41 people on board during a domestic flight in Egypt from Cairo to Hurghada and forces it to fly to Amman, Jordan, where the hijacker surrenders to the authorities.
- February 12 – Operation Pershing begins against Viet Cong and North Vietnamese Army units in Bình Định and Quảng Ngãi provinces in South Vietnam; it will last until January 1968. The U.S. Army's 1st Cavalry Division (Airmobile) takes part alongside other U.S. Army, South Vietnamese Army, and South Korean Army units.
- February 13 – United States President Lyndon B. Johnson orders a six-day halt of American bombing raids over Vietnam during the visit of Soviet Premier Alexei Kosygin to London.
- February 16 – Garuda Indonesia Flight 708, a Lockheed L-188A Electra, crashes on landing at Manado on Sulawesi in Indonesia, killing 22 of the 92 people on board.
- February 21 – McDonnell Aircraft completes the 2,000th F-4 Phantom II.
- February 22 – 845 troops of the U.S. Army's 173rd Airborne Brigade take part in Operation Junction City, the only paratrooper assault of the Vietnam War
- February 26 – U.S. Navy A-6 Intruders of Attack Squadron 35 (VA-35) drop naval mines in the mouth of the Sông Cái and Gianh rivers. The aerial mining of five North Vietnamese waterways will be completed by mid-April.

=== March ===
- The AGM-62 Walleye television-guided glide bomb is used in combat for the first time when U.S. Navy aircraft in Vietnam employ it in an attack on enemy barracks at Sam Lon.
- March 5
  - Varig Airlines Flight 837, a Douglas DC-8-33, crashes on approach to Roberts International Airport in Monrovia, Liberia, killing 51 of the 90 people on board and five people on the ground.
  - A propeller fails aboard Lake Central Flight 527, a Convair CV-580, causing its blades to penetrate the cabin and sever control cables. The airliner crashes near Marseilles, Ohio, killing all 38 people on board.
  - The second launch of the United States Air Force's Martin X-23 PRIME (Precision Reentry Including Maneuvering reEntry) experimental lifting body re-entry vehicle – designed to maneuver during reentry of Earth's atmosphere and be recovered in midair by a specially-equipped Lockheed JC-130B Hercules aircraft – takes place atop an Atlas SLV-3 launch vehicle at Vandenberg Air Force Base, California. The mission simulates a cross-range reentry taking the vehicle 654 miles (1,053 kilometers) off its ballistic track and banking at hypersonic speeds. The X-23's recovery parachute deploys properly for the first time and two of the recovery aircraft locate it, but its reefing cutters fail to actuate, making it dangerous to attempt to bring the X-23 aboard one of the JC-130Bs. The X-23 descends into the Pacific Ocean beneath its parachute and sinks when its flotation balloon sinks before a surface ship can reach it.
- March 9 – Trans World Airlines Flight 553, a McDonnell Douglas DC-9-15, collides in mid-air with a Beechcraft Baron over Concord Township near Urbana, Ohio. All 25 people on the DC-9 and the Beechcraft's sole occupant die. The accident leads the Federal Aviation Administration to place speed restrictions on aircraft flying below 10,000 feet (3,048 m) and contributes to its decision to create Terminal Control Areas.
- March 10
  - American aircraft attack the steel and iron works at Thái Nguyên, North Vietnam, for the first time.
  - After the F-4 Phantom of his wingman, Captain Earl Aman, suffers damage from antiaircraft fire over North Vietnam and loses almost all of its fuel, U.S. Air Force Captain Robert Pardo has Aman lower his tailhook and pushes Aman's F-4 by maneuvering to place Aman's tailhook against the base of his own windscreen. With one of his own F-4's engines on fire, Pardo pushes Aman' powerless plane for 90 miles (145 km), and all four men aboard the two fighters eject over Laos, where they can avoid capture, rather than North Vietnam.
  - West Coast Airlines Flight 720, a Fokker F27 Friendship, crashes on Stukel Mountain just after takeoff in a mix of snow and rain from Klamath Falls Airport in Klamath Falls, Oregon, due to icing of its wings and control surfaces, killing all four people on board.
- March 13
  - A former Soviet Air Force and Aeroflot pilot steals an Aeroflot Antonov An-2P (registration CCCP-04959) at Tuapse in the Soviet Union, intending to fly to Turkey. A Soviet Air Defense Forces Yakovlev Yak-28P (NATO reporting name "Firebar") intercepts the An-2P, and a Soviet Air Force MiG-17 (NATO reporting name "Fresco") later shoots it down over the Black Sea, killing the defecting pilot.
  - The pilot of South African Airways Flight 406, a Vickers Viscount 818, suffers a heart attack while the airliner is on approach to East London, South Africa. The co-pilot is unable to regain control of the Viscount, and it crashes into the Indian Ocean off the Eastern Cape province of South Africa, killing all 25 people on board.
- March 30 - Delta Air Lines Flight 9877, a DC-8, crashes in New Orleans during a training flight, killing all 6 people on board and 13 on the ground.

=== April ===
- April 1
  - The United States Department of Transportation begins operations. The Federal Aviation Agency is renamed the Federal Aviation Administration and becomes a component of the new department, and its largest component. The Civil Aeronautics Board also becomes part of the new department.
  - The United States creates the National Transportation Safety Board, responsible for civil transportation accident investigation, including aviation accidents and incidents. It takes over this function from the Civil Aeronautics Board, whose responsibilities henceforth are limited to the regulation of commercial airline routes and fares.
- April 6 – Trans World Airlines retires it last Lockheed Constellation from passenger service and becomes the first all-jet airline.
- April 7 – After a Syrian mortar attack against the Israeli farming community of Gadot escalates into a general exchange of tank and artillery fire all along the Syrian-Israeli border, Israeli Air Force Dassault Mirage III fighter-bombers conduct bombing attacks against Syrian Army positions. A large force of Syrian Air Force MiG-21 (NATO reporting name "Fishbed") fighters responds. Within minutes, the Mirages shoot down six MiG-21s and chase the survivors as far as the outskirts of Damascus, Syria, before breaking off pursuit.
- April 7–22 – The U.S. Army's 1st Cavalry Division (Airmobile) conducts Operation Lejeune, a helicopter and ground assault against Viet Cong forces in Quảng Ngãi Province, South Vietnam.
- April 10
  - The chief of the Egyptian Air Force arrives in Damascus, Syria; the Premier of Egypt will join him there on April 18. Although their visit allegedly is to work out plans for a common stand against Israel by Syria and Egypt, the Egyptian officials actually warn Syria against further attacks on Israel.
  - Gates Rubber Company acquires a controlling interest in Lear Jet Industries.
- April 11 – A Cessna Skymaster piloted by Whataburger co-founder Harmon Dobson crashes shortly after takeoff in La Porte, Texas, killing Dobson and a business associate.
- April 17 – Japan Air Lines (JAL) begins a Tokyo-Moscow service using four Tupolev Tu-114 (NATO reporting name "Cleat") airliners reconfigured to a two-class layout with 105-seats and a mixed Aeroflot-JAL crew that includes one JAL flight crew member and a cabin crew of 10, of which five are from JAL and five from Aeroflot. The service continues until 1969, when the airliners are returned to Aeroflot and to their Soviet domestic 200-seat layout.
- April 18 – Aeroflot and Japan Air Lines jointly inaugurate a Moscow-Tokyo service.
- April 19 – The third and final launch of the United States Air Force's Martin X-23 PRIME (Precision Reentry Including Maneuvering reEntry) experimental lifting body re-entry vehicle – designed to maneuver during reentry of Earth's atmosphere and be recovered in midair by a specially-equipped Lockheed JC-130B Hercules aircraft – takes place atop an Atlas SLV-3 launch vehicle at Vandenberg Air Force Base, California. The mission simulates reentry from low Earth orbit with cross-range maneuvers taking the vehicle 710 miles (1,143 kilometers) off its ballistic track. All systems work perfectly and the X-23 is recovered in mid-air by a JC-130B over the Pacific Ocean in condition to fly again, although no further X-23 flights take place.
- April 20
  - American aircraft attack power plants in Haiphong, North Vietnam, for the first time.
  - Making its third attempt to land at Nicosia Airport during a violent thunderstorm, a Globe Air Bristol Britannia 313 crashes south of the airport near Lakatamia, Cyprus, killing 126 of the 130 people on board and seriously injuring three of the four survivors.
- April 23 – Five hijackers commandeer a Nigeria Airways Fokker F27 Friendship during a domestic flight in Nigeria from Benin City to Lagos. The airliner diverts to a landing in Enugu, Nigeria.
- April 25 – A U.S. Air Force 551st Airborne Early Warning and Control Wing EC-121H Warning Star crashes in the Atlantic Ocean off Nantucket, Massachusetts, killing 15 of the 16-man crew.
- April 27 – In North Vietnam, U.S. Navy aircraft strike Kép Air Base and U.S. Air Force aircraft attack Hòa Lạc Air Base.
- April 28 – The Douglas Aircraft Company and McDonnell Aircraft Corporation merge to form the McDonnell-Douglas Corporation.

=== May ===
- U.S. Navy "Alpha strikes" against North Vietnam become routine.
- May 1 – The U.S. Federal Aviation Administration signs a contract with the Boeing Company for the construction of two Boeing 2707 supersonic transports.
- May 15 – As the possibility of war with Israel looms, President of Egypt Gamel Abdel Nasser places the Egyptian Air Force and Egyptian Army on full nationwide alert.
- May 18 – The National Aeronautics and Space Administration (NASA) announces crew members for the first Apollo program space mission, Apollo 7. They are Walter M. Schirra, Jr., Donn F. Eisele, and R. Walter Cunningham.
- May 20 – American aircraft strike military targets in downtown Hanoi.
- May 23 – United States President Lyndon B. Johnson's administration prohibits any American air attacks within a 10-mile (16-km) radius of Hanoi.
- May 31 – A U.S. Air Force KC-135 Stratotanker makes an emergency refuelling of six U.S. Navy jets.

=== June ===
- MiG fighters in North Vietnam withdraw to bases in the People's Republic of China.
- June 3 – The Air Ferry Douglas DC-4 G-APYK. on a charter flight from Manston Airport to Perpignan, crashes into Mount Canigou, France, killing all 88 passengers and crew.
- June 4 – The British Midland Airways Canadair C-4 Argonaut G-ALHG suffers a fuel system problem and crashes in Hopes Carr, Stockport, England, killing 72 of the 84 people on board and seriously injuring all 12 survivors.
- June 5
  - The Six-Day War begins between Israel and her Arab neighbors Egypt, Jordan, and Syria; Israel has 286 combat aircraft, while Egypt has 430, Syria has 127, and Jordan has 24. Israel opens the war with an 80-minute series of surprise pre-emptive Israeli Air Force strikes against Egyptian Air Force bases which destroy over 250 Egyptian aircraft, almost all of them on the ground, kill some 100 of Egypt's 350 combat pilots, destroy 23 radar and surface-to-air missile sites, and crater the runways of ten major air bases. Egypt is caught with only five aircraft – the Egyptian Air Force's Ilyushin Il-14 (NATO reporting name "Crate") airborne command post and four unarmed trainers – airborne, and the trainers are shot down. Twenty-eight Egyptian MiGs get into the air, but Israeli aircraft shoot 12 of them down and the remainder crash when they cannot find a serviceable runway to land on; the Il-14 lands at Cairo International Airport, the only Egyptian plane to land safely anywhere during the morning. The Egyptian Air Force is knocked out of the war. Israel loses 19 aircraft during the strikes – two Dassault Mystères in air-to-air combat, one Sud Aviation Vautour to ground fire, and 16 to non-combat causes.
  - The Royal Jordanian Army shells Israel's Ramat David Airbase and 16 Royal Jordanian Air Force Hawker Hunters attack Israeli airbases and villages around Netanya, Kfar Sirkin, and Kfar Saba, destroying one Nord Noratlas transport plane. After the Jordanian planes return to base, Israeli Air Force aircraft diverted from operations against Egypt attack their bases at Amman and Mafraq, shooting down two Hunters, destroying 16 more and extensively damaging the remaining six, all on the ground, and also destroying two helicopters and three light transport aircraft on the ground. American pilots fly five F-104 Starfighters in Jordan they have not yet turned over to the Jordanians to Turkey as soon as the war begins, and Jordan is left with no operational combat aircraft.
  - In the afternoon, the Israeli Air Force attacks all five Syrian Air Force bases, destroying 51 fighters, two bombers, and two helicopters on the ground, putting all the bases out of service, and shooting down four MiG-17 (NATO reporting name "Fresco") fighters in air-to-air combat. It also attacks airbases in western Iraq, destroying 20 more aircraft there. Israel loses one Mystère. Israel's successful attacks on its opponents allow the Israeli Air Force to focus on ground-attack missions for the remainder of the war.
  - Israeli Air Force Aérospatiale Super Frelon and Sikorsky S-58 helicopters carry 150 Israeli Army paratroopers into action in operations to reduce Egyptian Army positions around Umm Katef in the Sinai Peninsula.
  - Boeing delivers its 1,000th jet airliner, a Boeing 707-120B built for American Airlines.
- June 6
  - Israeli aircraft mount heavy strikes against Royal Jordanian Army tanks in Jordan's Dotan Valley.
  - In response to the growth of air traffic in Brazil, the Brazilian military government initiates studies concerning the renovation of the country's airport infrastructure. Among other things, the studies will recommend the construction of new passenger facilities in the areas of Galeão Air Force Base in Rio de Janeiro and São Paulo Air Force Base in São Paulo, leading eventually to the construction of a new passenger terminal at Rio de Janeiro–Galeão International Airport and the construction of São Paulo–Guarulhos International Airport.
- June 7
  - Israeli aircraft conduct heavy strikes against Syrian trenchlines and bunkers in the Golan Heights.
  - Three Israeli Air Force Nord Noratlas transport planes land on the runway at Sharm el-Sheikh, Egypt, and discharge paratroopers, who seize the Egyptian base there. Later in the day, Israeli helicopters land paratroopers at nearby El-Tor, which they also capture.
- June 8
  - In the USS Liberty Incident, Israeli Air Force aircraft join Israeli Navy torpedo boats in attacking the U.S. Navy technical research ship USS Liberty (AGTR-5) in the Mediterranean Sea north of the Sinai Peninsula. Liberty suffers heavy damage, with 34 of her crew killed and 171 wounded.
  - Israeli Air Force planes fly continuously over the Suez Canal, attacking Egyptian Army forces attempting to retreat across it. Heavy Egyptian antiaircraft fire shoots down three Dassault Ouragans and two Dassault Mystères.
- June 9 – The Israeli Air Force mounts a large, continuous attack against Syrian Army defensive positions in the Golan Heights, employing high-explosive bombs and napalm, and dropping bombs designed to crater runways on Syrian bunkers.
- June 10 – The Six-Day War ends in a complete Israeli triumph. During the war, the Arab countries have lost 452 aircraft, while Israel has lost 46.
- June 17 – The Vietnam War's heaviest air attacks in nine months are American strikes targeting railroads near Hanoi.
- June 18 – The first regularly scheduled winter flight to Antarctica takes place, when the U.S. Navy C-130L Hercules City of Christchurch, with the commander of U.S. Naval Support Force Antarctica, U.S. Navy Rear Admiral James Lloyd Abbot, Jr., in the cockpit alongside its pilot, flies from Christchurch, New Zealand, to McMurdo Station with 22 people (including two parties of scientists riding as passengers), 5,000 pounds (2,268 kg) of mail, and almost 3,000 pounds (1,361 kg) of fresh food on board. All previous winter flights to Antarctica had been solely for the emergency evacuation of medical patients. The aircraft returns to Christchurch the following day.
- June 23 – Mohawk Airlines Flight 40, a BAC 1-11 204AF, crashes at Blossburg, Pennsylvania, due to a non-return valve failure, killing all 34 passengers and crew. It is the deadliest accident in the history of Mohawk Airlines.
- June 30
  - Thai Airways International Flight 601, a Sud Aviation Caravelle, crashes into the South China Sea while on approach to Kai Tak Airport in Hong Kong, killing 24 of the 80 people on board and injuring all 56 survivors.
  - Aden Airways ceases operations.

=== July ===
- July 19
  - The last U.S. Navy component of the Military Airlift Command, Air Transport Squadron 3, is disestablished at McGuire Air Force Base, New Jersey. Henceforth the Military Airlift Command consists only of U.S. Air Force components.
  - The Piedmont Airlines Boeing 727-22 Manhattan Pacemaker, operating as Flight 22 with 79 people on board, collides with a Lanseair, Inc., Cessna 310 with three people on board shortly after takeoff from Asheville Regional Airport in Asheville, North Carolina. Both aircraft crash, killing all 82 people on the two planes; among the dead on the Piedmont jet is John T. McNaughton, U.S. Assistant Secretary of Defense for International Security Affairs and one of United States Secretary of Defense Robert McNamara's closest advisers. The incident is the first major air accident investigated by the newly formed U.S. National Transportation Safety Board.
- July 29 – On Yankee Station in the Gulf of Tonkin off North Vietnam, a flight deck fire aboard the aircraft carrier USS Forrestal (CVA-59) kills 134 men, injures 161, destroys 21 aircraft, and knocks the ship out of action until April 1968.

=== August ===
- United States President Lyndon B. Johnson's administration restricts all American bombing of targets in central Hanoi for two months, effective to October.
- August 6 – Five Colombian men hijack an Aerocondor Colombia Douglas C-54A-15-DC Skymaster with 71 people on board during a domestic flight in Colombia from Barranquilla to San Andrés and force it to fly to Havana, Cuba.
- August 7 – Aerolíneas Argentinas and Iberia Airlines jointly inaugurate the world's longest non-stop air route, between Buenos Aires and Madrid.
- August 9 – The world's first radar-equipped antisubmarine helicopter enters service, a Royal Navy Fleet Air Arm Westland Wessex HAS.3 with No. 814 Squadron.
- August 10 – Flying an F-4B Phantom II of United States Navy Fighter Squadron 142 (VF-142) from the attack aircraft carrier USS Constellation (CVA-64), Lieutenant Commander Robert Davis and Lieutenant Guy Freeborn shoot down two MiG-21s (NATO reporting name "Fishbed") over North Vietnam using AIM-9 Sidewinder air-to-air missiles.
- August 11 – F-105 Thunderchiefs of the U.S. Air Force's 335th Tactical Fighter Wing cut the Paul Doumer Bridge in Hanoi, North Vietnam, using 100 tons (90.7 metric tons/tonnes) of bombs.
- August 19 – U.S. Marine Corps Captain Stephen W. Pless, piloting a UH-1E attack helicopter near Quang Ngai, South Vietnam, drives Viet Cong forces away from Americans stranded on a beach and then lands under heavy fire to rescue them. He will receive the Medal of Honor for his actions, and his crew will receive the Navy Cross.
- August 27 – Lake Erie skydiving disaster: After an air traffic controller confuses a converted civilian North American B-25 Mitchell with another plane, the B-25 mistakenly drops eighteen skydivers over Lake Erie, four or five nautical miles (7.5–9.3 km) from Huron, Ohio. Sixteen drown. A National Transportation Safety Board report will later fault the pilot and controller, and to a lesser extent the skydivers. The United States will be held liable for the controller's negligence.
- August 30
  - American aircraft bomb North Vietnamese road, railroad, and canal traffic in an attempt to isolate Haiphong.
  - The Spanish Navy acquires the second aviation ship and first true aircraft carrier in its history when the United States loans the light aircraft carrier USS Cabot (CVL-28) to Spain under the Mutual Defense Assistance Program; Spain will purchase the ship outright in 1973. Renamed Dédalo (R01), she will serve in the Spanish Navy until 1989.

=== September ===
- September 1 – The U.S. Navy's first dedicated search-and-rescue squadron, Helicopter Combat Support Squadron 7 (HC-7), is commissioned at Atsugi, Japan. It operates UH-2 Seasprite helicopters. Previously, all Navy search-and-rescue had been performed by helicopter antisubmarine squadrons.
- September 3 – Saudi businessman Mohammed bin Awad bin Laden, the father of future al-Qaeda leader Osama bin Laden, is among two people killed when his company Beechcraft 18 (registration HZ-IBN) crashes while trying to land on an airstrip at Usran in southwestern Saudi Arabia.
- September 9 – Three passengers hijack an Avianca Douglas C-47-DL Skytrain (registration HK-101) with 20 people on board during a domestic flight in Colombia from Barranquilla to Magangué and force it to fly to Santiago de Cuba, Cuba.
- September 11 – U.S. Navy aircraft strike the port facilities at Cẩm Phả, North Vietnam, for the first time.
- September 19 – Delta Air Transport begins operations with a flight from Antwerp, Belgium, to Amsterdam, the Netherlands, using a Beechcraft Queen Air.
- September 22 – North American Aviation and the Rockwell-Standard Corporation merge to form the North American Rockwell Corporation.

=== October ===
- October 1 – Frontier Airlines purchases Central Airlines and takes over its airliner fleet and routes.
- October 3
  - The U.S. Navy's first dedicated search-and-rescue squadron, Helicopter Combat Support Squadron Seven (HC-7), makes its first rescue, saving an American airman downed in Haiphong Harbor, North Vietnam.
  - U.S. Air Force Major William J. Knight sets a new world airspeed record in the North American X-15A-2, reaching Mach 6.72 (4,520 mph, 7,274 km/h), and lands safely despite multiple structural failures that cause the X-15's scramjet module to separate from the aircraft and damage the fuel-jettison system. It will prove to be the highest speed achieved by any aircraft at any time during the 20th century.
- October 5
  - Soviet test pilot Mikhail M. Komarov averages 2,981.5 km/h (1,851.5 mph) over a 500-km (310.5-mile) closed circuit in a Mig Ye-155, setting a new speed record for the distance with no payload.
  - Soviet test pilot Alexander V. Fedotov sets a new altitude record with a 1,000-kg (2,205-pound) payload in a Mig Ye-155, reaching 29,977 meters (98,349 feet).
  - American astronaut Clifton Williams is killed in the crash of his T-38 Talon near Tallahassee, Florida.
- October 8
  - American aircraft strike Cat Bi airfield near Haiphong in North Vietnam for the first time.
  - The first helicopter gunship designed as such to see combat, the U.S. Army's AH-1G Cobra, flies its first combat mission when two AH-1Gs operating over South Vietnam escort U.S. Army transport helicopters, then support South Vietnamese troops by destroying four enemy fortifications and sinking 14 sampans.
- October 12 – The de Havilland DH.106 Comet 4B G-ARCO, operating as Cyprus Airways Flight 284, breaks up in mid-air and crashes into the Mediterranean Sea 22 miles (35 km) south of Demre, Turkey, killing all 66 people on board.
- October 23 – American aircraft attack Phúc Yên Air Base, North Vietnam's largest airfield, for the first time.

=== November ===
- November 4 – Iberia Airlines Flight 062, Sud Aviation Caravelle EC-BDD operating a scheduled flight from Málaga Airport, Spain, to London Heathrow Airport, flies into Blackdown, Sussex, killing all 37 on board. English actress June Thorburn is among the dead.
- November 6 – Trans World Airways Flight 159, a Boeing 707-131, aborts its takeoff from Greater Cincinnati Airport in Hebron, Kentucky, because of the co-pilot's fear that it had struck a disabled Delta Air Lines Douglas DC-9 on the runway during its takeoff roll. The 707 overruns the end of the runway and crashes, killing one and injuring 10 of the 36 people on board.
- November 8–9 (overnight) – Shot down by Viet Cong ground fire in an HH-3E helicopter and badly burned during a rescue mission southeast of Khe Sanh, South Vietnam, U.S. Air Force Captain Gerald O. Young deliberately draws attention to himself, then evades the enemy on the ground for hours to lead enemy forces away from other Americans on the ground and additional helicopters coming to rescue them. He will receive the Medal of Honor for his actions.
- November 15 – A North American X-15 on a high-altitude flight enters a spin at over Mach 5 and breaks up well above Mach 4, killing its pilot, U.S. Air Force Major Michael J. Adams. His is the only death during the X-15 program.
- November 16
  - American aircraft attack the shipyards at Haiphong, North Vietnam, for the first time.
  - Aeroflot Flight 2230, an Ilyushin Il-18V (NATO reporting name "Coot") crashes shortly after takeoff from Yekaterinburg in the Soviet Union, killing all 107 people aboard.
- November 17 – American aircraft strike Bach Mai Airfield near Hanoi for the first time.
- November 20 – Trans World Airlines Flight 128, a Convair 880, crashes in Constance, Kentucky, while on approach to Greater Cincinnati Airport, killing 70 of the 82 people on board.

=== December ===
- Aero Commuter, the future Golden West Airlines, is founded.
- December 4 – The A-7A Corsair II strike aircraft enters combat for the first time, operating from the attack aircraft carrier USS Ranger (CVA-61) over Vietnam.
- December 8 – American astronaut Robert Henry Lawrence, Jr., is killed when a United States Air Force F-104 Starfighter in which he is serving as an instructor pilot for a flight test trainee crashes at Edwards Air Force Base, California. The trainee ejects and survives with serious injuries.
- December 10 – Singer Otis Redding and four members of his back-up band, The Bar-Kays, are among six people killed in the crash of a Beechcraft 18 into Lake Monona in Madison, Wisconsin.
- December 18 – In Tucson, Arizona, a McDonnell F-4D Phantom II crashed into a supermarket (and several homes) shortly after takeoff from Davis–Monthan AFB; the two crewmen from Nellis AFB ejected safely, but four on the ground were killed.
- December 26 – The Soviet Union commissions its first helicopter carrier, Moskva.
- December 30 – Aeroflot Flight L-51 crashed during landing in Liepāja. It is the deadliest aviation accident in Latvian history with 43 fatalities.
- December 31
  - The Royal Air Force's V bomber force begins to be dismantled, pending the deployment of the Polaris missile aboard Royal Navy submarines to act as Britain's nuclear deterrent.
  - The National Aeronautics and Space Administration (NASA) begins initial talks to develop guidelines for a re-usable spaceplane.

== First flights ==
- Bellanca Viking

=== January ===
- Cessna O-2 Skymaster
- January 4 - Taylor Titch G-ATYO

=== February ===
- February 8 - Saab Viggen
- February 10 - Dornier Do 31

=== March ===
- March 1 - SIAT 223 Flamingo
- March 3 – Beriev Be-30 (NATO reporting name "Cuff")
- March 11 - Bede BD-2

=== April ===
- April 7
  - SA.340, prototype of the Aérospatiale Gazelle
  - Found Centennial 100
- April 8 - Beagle B.121 Pup
- April 9 - Boeing 737
- April 21 - Rollason Beta

=== May ===
- May 9 - Fokker F28
- May 12 - Aermacchi AM-3
- May 23
  - Hawker Siddeley Nimrod
  - Mitchell Kittiwake

=== June ===
- June 10 – Mikoyan-Gurevich MiG-23 prototype 23-11/1
- June 30 – BAC One-Eleven Series 500 prototype G-ASYD

=== August ===
- Schweizer QT-2
- August 18 – Handley Page Jetstream

=== October ===
- October 5 - Shin Meiwa SS-2
- October 23 - Canadair CL-215
- October 26 - BAC Strikemaster

=== November ===
- November 7 - SOCATA ST 10
- November 18 - Dassault Mirage G
- November 28 - Pilatus PC-8D Twin Porter

=== December ===
- December 21 - SITAR GY-100 Bagheera
- December 22 - MHK-101
- December 26 - FMA IA 58 Pucará (unpowered prototype)

== Entered service ==
- Mil Mi-8
- Sukhoi Su-15 (NATO reporting name "Flagon") with the Soviet Air Defense Forces

=== March ===
- Cessna O-2 Skymaster with the United States Air Force

=== May ===
- May 16 – Beechcraft U-21 Ute with United States Army

=== June ===
- Bell AH-1G Cobra with the United States Army

=== July ===
- July 18 – General Dynamics F-111 with the U.S. Air Force's 448th Tactical Fighter Squadron; first variable-geometry wing aircraft to enter service, the first with terrain-following radar, and the first able to score direct hits in zero visibility on the first attempt

=== August ===
- Tupolev Tu-134 with Aeroflot

=== September ===
- Beechcraft Baron Model 56TC
- Bell UH-1H Iroquois with United States Army
- Tupolev Tu-134 (NATO reporting name "Crusty") with Aeroflot
- September 15 – Ilyushin IL-62 with Aeroflot
- September 26 – Hamburger Flugzeugbau HFB-320 Hansa Jet with Italcementi

=== November ===
- November 17 – BAC One-Eleven Series 500 with British European Airways (BEA)

== Retirements ==
- Avro 707
- November 6 – Martin P-5 Marlin by Patrol Squadron 40 (VP-40), United States Navy

== Deadliest crash ==
The deadliest crash of this year was the 1967 Nicosia Britannia disaster on 20 April, when a Bristol Britannia 313 crashed near Lakatamia, Cyprus, killing 126 of the 130 people on board.
