= JAG season 5 =

JAG
- Season 5
- Starring: David James Elliott; Catherine Bell; Patrick Labyorteaux; John M. Jackson; Karri Turner; Steven Culp
- No. of episodes: 25

Release
- Original network: CBS
- Original release: September 21, 1999 – May 23, 2000

Season chronology
- ← Previous; Season 4 Next → Season 6

The fifth season of JAG premiered on CBS on September 21, 1999, and concluded on May 23, 2000. The season, starring David James Elliott and Catherine Bell, was produced by Belisarius Productions in association with, what was then-known as, Paramount Television (its post 2006 name is CBS Studios).

== Plot ==
Lieutenant Commander Harmon "Harm" Rabb Jr. (David James Elliott), now back as an F-14 Tomcat pilot aboard the USS Patrick Henry, finds himself forced to defend a young lieutenant who has mistakenly fired upon Russian armored vehicles ("King of the Greenie Board"), while his former partner (and newly promoted) Lieutenant Colonel Sarah "Mac" MacKenzie (Catherine Bell) continues to enforce, prosecute and defend the Uniform Code of Military Justice (UCMJ) from within the Headquarters of the Judge Advocate General, a division of the Department of the Navy. This season, Mac is pitted against Mic Brumby (Trevor Goddard) in court ("Rules of Engagement"), Harm is forced to push a plane to safety using a tailhook ("True Calling") before returning to JAG ("The Return"), Mac investigate psy-ops ("Psychic Warrior"), Harm is awarded the Distinguished Flying Cross ("Front and Center"), Bud (Patrick Labyorteaux) is kidnapped ("Rogue"), and, on the orders of Rear Admiral A.J. Chegwidden (John M. Jackson), the team travel to Sydney, New South Wales, Australia ("Boomerang"). Meanwhile, Gunnery Sergeant Victor "Gunny" Galindez (Randy Vasquez) is accused of gay-bashing ("People v. Gunny"), Harm investigates a decade-old murder ("Body Talk"), and Mic resigns his Australian commission ("Surface Warfare").

== Production ==
Prior to the start of JAG's fifth season, the series entered syndication. At the time season five was first aired in the United States, JAG was seen in over 90 countries worldwide.

From 12 to 14 July 1999, the JAG production team including its three main actors were allowed by the US Navy to film scenes on location aboard the nuclear-powered aircraft carrier USS John C. Stennis (CVN-74), while she sailed off the coast of California. It was the first time the JAG production team were on board an active aircraft carrier at sea and while it was conducting flight operations. The footage obtained from this visit were used for the first three episodes of the season.

The 100th and 101st episodes of JAG were partially shot with the main cast on several locations in and around Sydney, New South Wales, Australia. Among the shooting locations were Fleet Base East, Luna Park Sydney, Manly Beach, St Patrick's Seminary, Sydney Airport, and aboard Sydney Ferries. These were the only episodes of JAG filmed outside the United States with the principal cast and crew.

== Cast and characters ==
=== Main ===
- David James Elliott as Harmon Rabb Jr., Commander, Navy JAG Corps
- Catherine Bell as Sarah MacKenzie, Lieutenant Colonel, Marine Corps Judge Advocate
- Patrick Labyorteaux as Bud Roberts, Lieutenant, Navy JAG Corps
- John M. Jackson as A. J. Chegwidden, Rear Admiral, Judge Advocate General of the Navy

=== Also starring ===
- Karri Turner as Harriet Sims, Lieutenant J.G.
- Steven Culp as Clayton Webb, CIA Officer

=== Recurring ===
- Terry O'Quinn as Thomas Boone, Rear Admiral, "CAG"
- Paul Collins as Hon. Alexander Nelson, Secretary of the Navy, "SecNav"
- Nanci Chambers as Loren Singer, Lieutenant, Navy JAG Corps
- Sibel Galindez as Elizabeth Hawkes, "Skates", Lieutenant
- Chuck Carrington as Jason Tiner, Petty Officer
- Harrison Page as Stiles Morris, Rear Admiral, military judge
- Claudette Nevins as Porter Webb, mother of Clayton Webb and retired NSA employee
- Michael Bellisario as Michael Roberts
- Anne-Marie Johnson as Hon. Roberta Latham, Congresswoman
- Dana Sparks as Carolyn Imes, Commander, Navy JAG Corps
- Mae Whitman as Chloe Maddison
- Trevor Goddard as Mic Brumby, Lieutenant Commander, RAN
- Randy Vasquez as Victor Galindez, Gunnery Sergeant, Marine Corps
- Cindy Ambuehl as Rene Peterson, television producer

== Episodes ==
No. overall	No. in season	Title	Directed by	Written by	Original release date	Prod. code	US viewers (millions)
86	1	"King of the Greenie Board"	Alan J. Levi	John Schulian	September 21, 1999	086	15.81
87	2	"Rules of Engagement"	Jeannot Szwarc	Ed Zuckerman	September 28, 1999	087	17.00
Harm's back flying a Tomcat with Skates as his RIO, however, Lt. Buxton, a hot-shot pilot, is making things difficult for him. Mac is promoted to lieutenant colonel. Mac's case involving a Marine who drank too much before testing a new weapons system brings a new member to the office. Lt. Buxton fires on what he believes are Serbian armored vehicles. Back on the carrier, Buxton is confronted by the skipper who tells him he in fact blew up a Russian armored vehicle. Lt. Buxton forces Harm to defend him in the court martial for the Russian truck he destroyed in the previous episode. Mic joins Harm on the defense team, while Mac and Bud prosecute.
88	3	"True Callings"	Alan J. Levi	Story by : Ed Zuckerman & John Schulian & Rear Admiral Paul T. Gillcrist; Teleplay by : Ed Zuckerman & John Schulian	October 5, 1999	088	15.57
Harm's career as a pilot is in jeopardy because of his long legal career, while a mission over Serbia turns into a crisis when his wingman's plane is crippled. Harm uses his F-14's windscreen and his wingman's tailhook to push him back to the USS Patrick Henry, saving his wingman's life. (Note: This is based on an actual historical event known as Pardo's Push: a title card at the end of the episode explains that: "On March 10th, 1967, U.S. Air Force Captain Robert Pardo used his F-4 Phantom to push a fellow American's badly damaged jet from North Vietnam into friendly territory.".) Harm also provides encouragement and support to his RIO, Elizabeth Hawkes, who is suffering from panic attacks from flying. Back at the office, Bud, Tiner, and Gunny each seek to curry the Admiral's favor by procuring tickets to a Limp Bizkit concert.
89	4	"The Return"	Greg Beeman	Larry Moskowitz	October 12, 1999	089	16.33
Harm's return to JAG is rocky, as his first case is to defend the SECNAV's son for disobeying an order during a refuelling, and he deals with a sympathetic SECNAV and the unyielding ship captain who was being tough on his son.
90	5	"Front and Center"	Alan Myerson	Dana Coen	October 19, 1999	090	16.19
When a Marine corporal goes AWOL rather than testify at an attempted rape trial, Harm and Mac must discover his secret while Harm is awarded his second Distinguished Flying Cross for his actions in "True Callings".
91	6	"Psychic Warrior"	Greg Beeman	Paul Levine	November 2, 1999	091	17.18
While Harm and Mac investigate the death of a Navy officer involved in a remote viewing project known as Star Gaze, Mac must also deal with someone close to her going missing.
92	7	"Rogue"	Tony Wharmby	Larry Moskowitz	November 9, 1999	092	16.79
Bud is assigned as an observer to accompany Raglan (John Diehl), a former Navy SEAL who is hired by the U.S. Department of Defense to test security at military bases. Raglan's next mission is to test the security around Naval Submarine Base New London. But when Raglan goes too far and hijacks an attack submarine with Bud on board as hostage and demands a $100 million ransom, or he'll take aim on a New York City target, Harm must play cat and mouse with the man to rescue Bud and thwart the attack.
93	8	"The Colonel's Wife"	Alan J. Levi	John Schulian	November 16, 1999	093	16.95
Olivia Dunston (Kristen Dalton), wife of Marine Colonel Dunston (Everett McGill) stationed in Panama, is accused of smuggling drugs, and her weak denials convince Mac that she is guilty. A fabulously wealthy college friend has Bud pondering his road not taken.
94	9	"Contemptuous Words"	Jeannot Szwarc	Ed Zuckerman	November 23, 1999	094	14.57
Harm's career is on the line when he is accused of writing an editorial highly critical of the President. Mac deals with a squabble between a late Marine's girlfriend, who wants to use his sperm to have children, and the Marine's estranged wife, who is opposed to such usage. After Harm is cleared of any wrongdoing he receives his promotion to commander from the SECNAV.
95	10	"Mishap"	Terrence O'Hara	Larry Moskowitz	November 30, 1999	095	18.32
Harm's former RIO, Lt. Elizabeth Hawkes, is charged with causing a "mishap" that crashed an F-14, and Harm defends her at court-martial while Mac prosecutes.
96	11	"Ghosts of Christmas Past"	Alan J. Levi	Story by : Donald P. Bellisario; Teleplay by : Ed Zuckerman & John Schulian	December 14, 1999	096	16.01
During his annual visit to the Vietnam Veterans Memorial, Harm meets Jenny Lake, a former singer in Bob Hope's USO band, who was there the Christmas his father (in 1969 a pilot on CVA-14 USS Ticonderoga) was shot down. The 1969 timeline is recreated through Harm's interpretation, with actors of the main cast portraying characters from 1969 and seen by Harm as the characters of the 1999 timeline. Note: The episode features the main and recurring cast playing different characters: David James Elliott as Harmon Rabb Senior, Catherine Bell as Jenny Lake, Karri Turner as Phyllis Diller, Anne-Marie Johnson as Diana Ross, Sibel Galindez as Dixie, Trevor Goddard as the CAG, Patrick Labyorteaux as Lt Gibson (Harm Senior's RIO, shot down with him at the end of the episode), Randy Vasquez as Lt Garcia, Paul Collins as press photographer Morton Steele, John M. Jackson as CPO Burns, Michael Bellisario as Ensign Everett, and Chuck Carrington as Lt Bond.
97	12	"Into the Breech"	Mark Horowitz	Paul Levine	January 11, 2000	097	13.85
While Harm and Mac are tutoring prep-school cadets at a Military high school for a "mock trial" of a 10-year-old incident of an explosion in a battleship turret that killed 29 sailors. Harm and Mac discover real witnesses leading to evidence which contradicts the official Navy findings. (Note: The opening scenes take place aboard the fictional USS Minnesota (BB-65); but the episode is clearly inspired of the USS Iowa turret explosion that occurred aboard battleship USS Iowa on April 19, 1989. The actual explosion was surrounded by controversial testimony, including allegations of a gay relationship between two of the sailors involved (who both lost their lives in the explosion).)
98	13	"Life or Death"	Tony Wharmby	Catherine Stribling	January 18, 2000	098	14.19
An outcast Marine killed three other Marines in the 1980s, and his capital case is now up for its final review before the United States Court of Appeals for the Armed Forces. Mac doesn't want to defend him but ends up taking the case, while Harm takes on the prosecution and Admiral Chegwidden is reflective because the convicted killer was his client a decade ago. Harm has dinner with Renee, while the office wishes Mic well as he heads to an Australian deployment in East Timor.
99	14	"Cabin Pressure"	Jeannot Szwarc	Dana Coen	February 1, 2000	099	14.45
As the ship collides with a reef, Harm is trapped below decks with two crew members, one a hotheaded murder suspect (Marco Sanchez) and the other the master-at-arms (Christopher Cousins) in a compartment that starts to fill with water. As the room they're in floods, Harm must find a way for them to escape. Admiral Chegwidden deals with the slow diminishment of his skills due to age.
100	15	"Boomerang"	Donald P. Bellisario & Jeannot Szwarc	Donald P. Bellisario	February 8, 2000	100	15.23
101	16	"Boomerang"	Donald P. Bellisario & Jeannot Szwarc	Donald P. Bellisario	February 15, 2000	101	16.59
Part I: At the request of Lieutenant Commander Mic Brumby, Admiral Chegwidden sends Harm and Bud down to Sydney, Australia in order to represent a U.S. sailor, Kevin Lee, who has suddenly surfaced 28 years after being "murdered" by an Australian sailor outside Luna Park Sydney. Lee contends that he accidentally killed his Australian nemesis years ago and, in a panic, exchanged identity with the dead man. Now, charged with murder, Lee is to be tried first in a New South Wales court (before Lee could be handed over to U.S. authorities for additional desertion charges), pitting Harm against Brumby. Harm and Brumby are also about to go head-to-head outside the courtroom when Mac appears in Sydney (officially on a mission to bring back the remains of the other body) and Brumby decides it's time to make her choose between him and Harm. (Note: The plot is reminiscent of Witness for the Prosecution, in this two-part episode filmed on location in Australia.) Part II: Kevin Lee's murder trial takes an unexpected twist after his wife changes her testimony under cross-examination. Harm and Mic come to blows over Mac, with Bud being caught in the crossfire and his jaw is broken in the process. Admiral Chegwidden is eventually forced to fly to Australia to berate Harm for his involvement. Although Bud is kind enough to let the two men off the hook, Chegwidden is not and prepares to deliver his own brand of punishment against Harm and Mic.
102	17	"People v. Gunny"	Terrence O'Hara	Larry Moskowitz	February 22, 2000	102	15.80
Gunnery Sergeant Galindez is accused of "gay-bashing" after an altercation outside a gay bar, and one of the key witnesses is Petty Officer Tiner. After Galindez is exonerated, as far as the military justice system is concerned, after a hearing: the State of Maryland then charges him for the same offence and Admiral Chegwidden acts as his defense attorney in the civilian court. Galindez tries to keep another key witness, Manny (Jesse Corti), a personal friend from his past out of this, but Manny wants to frame Tiner as a homosexual.
103	18	"The Bridge at Kang So Ri"	Ian Toynton	Ed Zuckerman & Paul Levine	February 29, 2000	103	15.19
Harm and Mac have to deal with South Korean radicals who hijack an Oceanic Airlines passenger plane carrying a U.S. Army General whom they accuse of ordering a cover-up of a mass murder at a chaotic bridge crossing during the Korean War.
104	19	"Promises"	Arthur W. Forney	John Schulian	March 28, 2000	104	15.17
A Navy sailor is charged with desertion, but she claims that her recruiter lied to her about what the service was about. Admiral Chegwidden helps a Naval Aviator friend of his who is facing being grounded for life after he took Viagra before flying. This episode contains the first appearance of Dr. Sydney Walden (Cynthia Sikes).
105	20	"Drop Zone"	Hugo Cortina	Larry Moskowitz	April 4, 2000	105	14.38
When a file implicating a Navy SEAL in the drowning death of a trainee ends up in the hands of Mac, the prosecutor for the case, she is accused of prosecutorial misconduct by Lieutenant Loren Singer, who is part of the defense. Admiral Chegwidden tries to decide where to take Dr. Walden for a romantic weekend.
106	21	"The Witches of Gulfport"	Tony Wharmby	Dana Coen	April 25, 2000	106	12.67
Mac goes undercover as an NCO in a construction battalion to assist in the investigation of a Chief Petty Officer (and local Wiccan leader) accused of sexual misconduct. Mic has his own undercover operation in Australia, but this leads to long-distance romance between him and Mac.
107	22	"Overdue & Presumed Lost"	Tony Wharmby	John Schulian & Paul Levine	May 2, 2000	107	12.50
Admiral Chegwidden tries to prevent a salvage hunter from recovering a submarine that disappeared just before the 1941 attack on Pearl Harbor in federal court, and after that effort fails he begrudgingly accompanies the salvage hunter who retrieves the intact log book from a safe aboard the sub. The log indicates a message was sent that they had encountered the Japanese fleet. The Admiral seeks to find out if the missing message may have been hidden due to a long-forgotten conspiracy. Bud defends an overweight sailor who is a computer genius and wants to stay in the Navy. The episode is followed by a message that reads: On the 100th anniversary of the United States Navy's first submarine, we dedicate this episode to the warriors, past and present, who have always run silent, run deep.
108	23	"Real Deal Seal"	Terrence O'Hara	Paul Levine	May 9, 2000	108	12.95
Lieutenant Curtis Rivers (Montel Williams) is in trouble again, this time for punching a Congressional candidate (Peter Brown) wearing a SEAL Trident and accusing him of being an impostor. Rivers complicates things by using his defense counsel, Harm, as bait in a lethal trap to lure out another phony SEAL. A U.S. Senator (James Karen) wants to recommend Admiral Chegwidden for a nomination as a Federal District Judge, but will the Admiral substitute his integrity for political expediency?
109	24	"Body Talk"	Terrence O'Hara	Dana Coen	May 16, 2000	109	13.21
Harm reopens a 10-year-old murder case and unexpectedly incurs the wrath of the victim's daughter, his friend Lieutenant Commander Teresa Coulter (Trisha Yearwood). Harm suspects that the original trial attorney did not dig deep enough into the case and as he pursues the investigation a new picture begins to develop.
110	25	"Surface Warfare"	Jeannot Szwarc	Ed Zuckerman	May 23, 2000	110	13.24
Bud's brother Mikey Roberts nearly shoots a Marine craft during a landing exercise near Key West, Florida, but establishing his innocence proves to be a difficult task, thanks to the age-old rivalry between the Navy and the Marines. Mic Brumby returns from Australia, saying he resigned his Royal Australian Navy commission to come back to live with Mac in Washington, D.C.

== See also ==
- 1999–2000 United States network television schedule
