= USCGC Kittiwake =

United States Coast Guard patrol boat

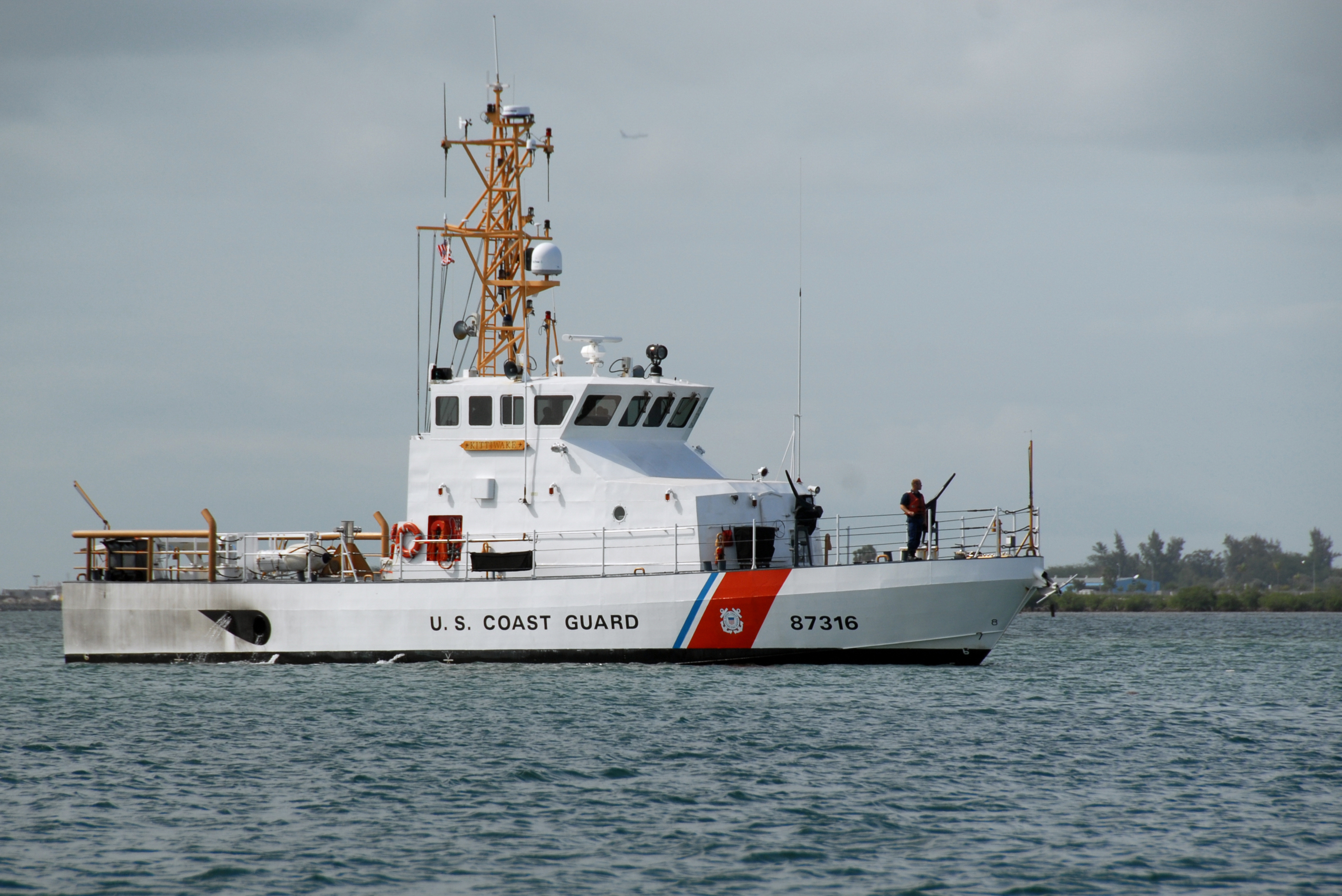
- Kittiwake enforces a security zone near Keehi Lagoon, Honolulu, in December 2008

History

United States
- Name: Kittiwake
- Namesake: Kittiwake
- Operator: United States Coast Guard
- Builder: Bollinger Shipyards, Lockport, Louisiana
- Completed: 1999
- Commissioned: June 30, 2000
- Home port: Nawiliwili Harbor, Kauai (2000–2010); Honolulu, Oahu (2010–)
- Identification: Hull number: WPB-87316
- Badge

General characteristics
- Class & type: Marine Protector-class patrol boat
- Length: 87 ft (27 m)
- Propulsion: 2 × MTU 8V396TE diesel engines, 1,400 hp (1,000 kW) each
- Speed: 27 knots (50 km/h; 31 mph)
- Range: 900 nautical miles (1,700 km)

USCGC Kittiwake (WPB-87316) is an 87-foot (27 m) Marine Protector-class patrol boat of the United States Coast Guard. It was commissioned in June 2000 at Nawiliwili Harbor on Kauai, Hawaii, where it replaced the 82-foot cutter Point Evans. In 2010 it moved to Honolulu on Oahu. Its main missions are search and rescue and law enforcement in waters up to 200 miles (320 km) from the main Hawaiian Islands. Members of its crew founded Coast Guard Station Kauai in 2002.

== Design ==
Kittiwake is one of the Marine Protector-class coastal patrol boats built for the Coast Guard by Bollinger Shipyards of Lockport, Louisiana, under a contract first awarded on March 13, 1996. The class replaced the older 82-foot Point-class cutters.

Kittiwake has a steel hull and an aluminum superstructure designed to handle 30-foot (9.1 m) seas. A stern ramp lets it launch and recover its diesel-powered waterjet small boat.

== Service history ==
In December 1999 the 82-foot patrol boat Point Evans, which had served at Kauai since 1993, was decommissioned at Nawiliwili Harbor and transferred to the Philippine Navy. After taking delivery of Kittiwake at Bollinger Shipyards in December 1999, the boat was sailed to San Diego through the Panama Canal.

Kittiwake's range of 900 nautical miles was too short for the 2,300 nautical mile trip from San Diego to Hawaii. Instead, it was lifted onto a custom cradle on the deck of the amphibious assault ship USS Essex and carried to Pearl Harbor. After being unloaded, it was towed to Coast Guard Group Honolulu on Sand Island, then sailed under its own power to Nawiliwili Harbor in four hours, twice as fast as Point Evans's best time.

=== Kauai ===
Kittiwake took over Point Evans's area of responsibility, which extended 200 miles (320 km) from the eight main Hawaiian Islands and took it regularly through the inter-island channels. Nawiliwili Harbor became its homeport in July 2000. In 2002 nine members of its crew left the cutter to set up Coast Guard Station Kauai at Nawiliwili.

On August 5, 2008, Kittiwake played a vessel in distress about 20 miles (32 km) east of Kauai in a search and rescue exercise with the U.S. Navy cruiser USS Lake Erie, the South Korean destroyer ROKS Munmu the Great and the Japan Maritime Self-Defense Force.

=== Honolulu ===
In July 2010 Kittiwake changed its homeport to Oahu, after lending artifacts to the Kauai Veterans Museum. On January 23, 2013, it trained off Hawaii with the Kodiak-based buoy tender Spar, which practiced towing it.

On August 17, 2013, a 61-year-old man lost consciousness aboard the passenger vessel Na Pali Runabout off Kauai. He was moved by stretcher to Kittiwake, whose crew helped hoist him into a helicopter from Air Station Barbers Point about 1 mile (1.6 km) from Kalalau Beach.

On November 27, 2017, the 57-foot (17 m) tuna longliner Jane sent out a mayday at 7:22 a.m. after taking on water about 110 miles (180 km) southeast of the Big Island. Kittiwake was sent along with a Coast Guard airplane and helicopter. Conditions on scene included 14-foot (4.3 m) seas and 34 miles per hour (55 km/h) winds. A Coast Guard HC-130 crew found the overturned boat and a life raft holding all six fishermen, who were picked up by the nearby fishing vessel VAK 2.

== See also ==
- List of United States Coast Guard cutters
