= Nash Petrel =

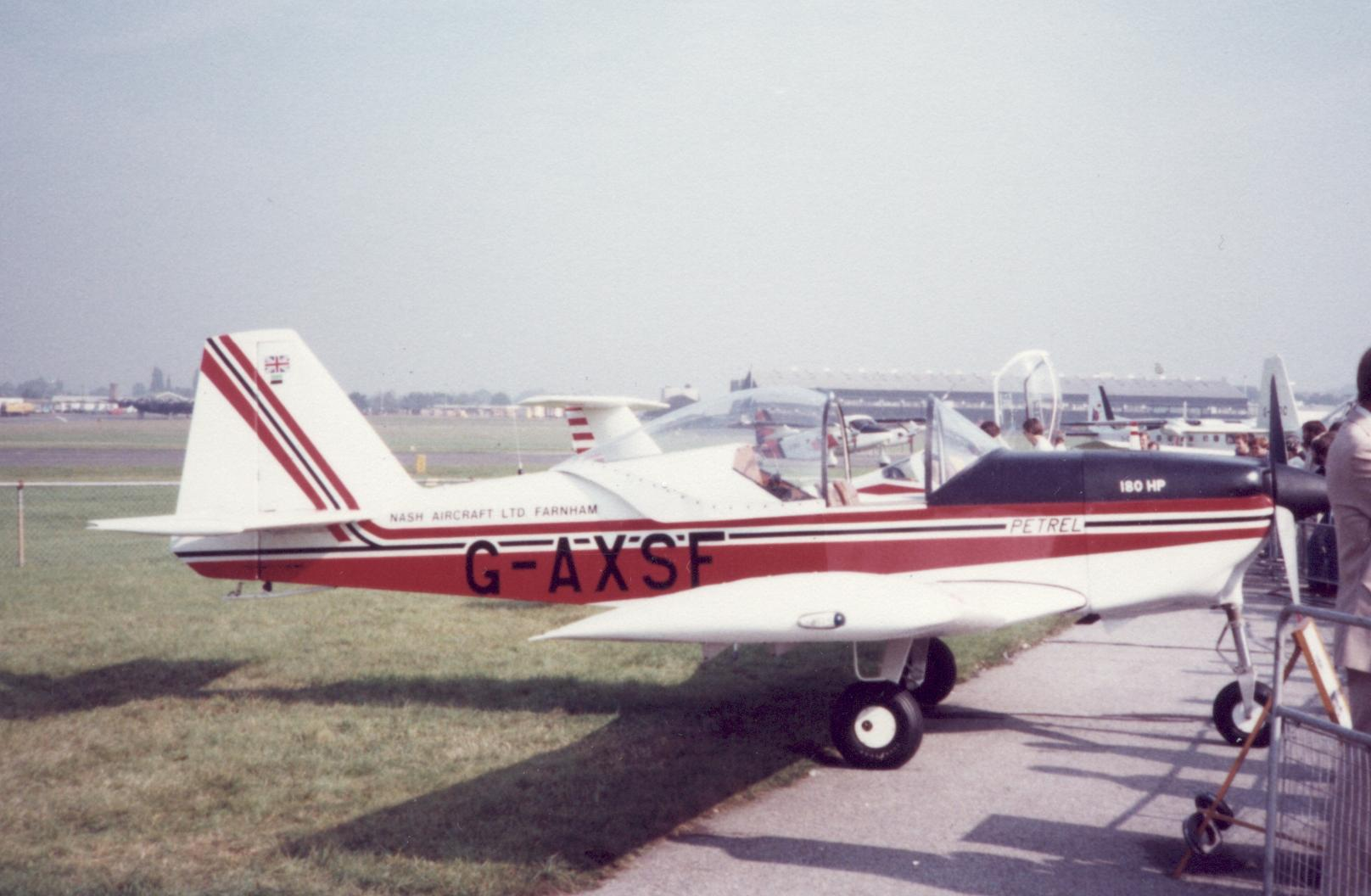
- The prototype Nash Petrel at the Farnborough SBAC Show in September 1982

General information
- Type: Two-seat utility monoplane
- National origin: United Kingdom
- Manufacturer: Procter Aircraft Associates; Nash Aircraft
- Number built: 3

History
- First flight: 8 November 1980
- Developed from: Procter Kittiwake

The Nash Petrel also known as the Procter Petrel is a two-seat aerobatic or glider tug aircraft. It was designed for amateur production by Procter Aircraft Associates of Camberley, Surrey, England. By the time the aircraft first flew, Procter had changed ownership and had been renamed Nash Aircraft Ltd.

== Development ==
Based on the earlier Mitchell-Procter Kittiwake design, the Petrel is an all-metal low-wing cantilever monoplane of conventional design powered by an Avco Lycoming O-320-D2A or Avco Lycoming O-360-A3A piston engine. Only three aircraft were built, the prototype registered G-AXSF, one built by apprentices at the British Aircraft Corporation factory at Preston in 1973, registered G-BACA, and another built in 1978, registered G-BFPJ. G-BACA had a serious fault with the landing gear and only flew 15 hours before being grounded. The prototype still exists but without a current certificate of airworthiness. It is presently fitted with a Lycoming O-360-A3A engine.

== Specifications ==
Data from Jane's All The World's Aircraft 1985–86

General characteristics

- Crew: 2
- Length: 6.22 m (20 ft 5 in)
- Wingspan: 9.04 m (29 ft 8 in)
- Height: 2.23 m (7 ft 4 in)
- Wing area: 13.00 m^{2} (139.9 sq ft)
- Aspect ratio: 6.3:1
- Airfoil: NACA 3415
- Empty weight: 544 kg (1,199 lb)
- Max takeoff weight: 794 kg (1,750 lb)
- Fuel capacity: 104.5 L (27.6 US gal; 23.0 imp gal)
- Powerplant: 1 × Avco Lycoming O-360-A3A air-cooled flat-four engine, 130 kW (180 hp)

Performance

- Maximum speed: 212 km/h (132 mph, 115 kn)
- Cruise speed: 167 km/h (104 mph, 90 kn)
- Stall speed: 74 km/h (46 mph, 40 kn) (flaps down)
- Rate of climb: 5.8 m/s (1,150 ft/min)
