= The Kittiwakes =

- The Kittiwakes in 2009, from left to right: Chris Harrison, Kate Denny and Jill Cumberbatch

Background information
- Origin: Essex, England
- Genres: Folk
- Labels: Midwich Records
- Members: Kate Denny; Chris Harrison; Jill Cumberbatch
- Website: www.thekittiwakes.com

The Kittiwakes are a three piece British folk band. The group consists of Kate Denny on vocals and violin, Chris Harrison on accordion and Jill Cumberbatch on violin, mandolin and guitar.

== History ==
The band was formed in 2007 in order to play and arrange compositions written by Denny after she had visited the Lofoten Islands in Norway. Denny already knew Harrison - who plays accordion and piano and a lot of other instruments - from their time working in music education in Greenwich and Lewisham. Cumberbatch joined the group after an advertisement was placed in a musician's website called Musofinder.

The band split up during the writing of a second album.

=== Lofoten Calling ===
Their first album, Lofoten Calling (September 2009), is a folk concept album. The concept is based on the people, wildlife, landscape and folklore of the Lofoten Islands, the north western archipelago in arctic Norway. The album has been given enthusiastic reviews from the music press critics. The album was chosen by reviewer Mark Beech of U.S. newswire Bloomberg News, in a report syndicated worldwide, as one of the best albums of 2009.

Their song The Arethusa is the title intro music of London arts radio show Little Atoms.
