= BRP Alberto Navarette =

Coastal patrol ship of the Philippine Navy

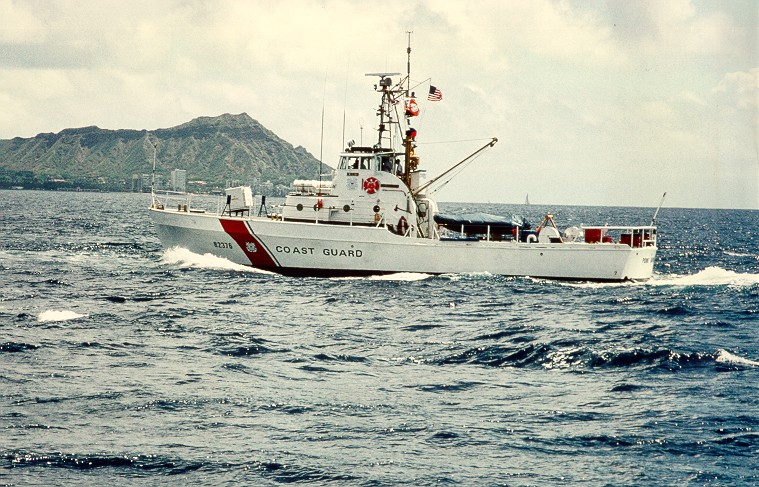
- As USCGC Point Evans.

History

United States
- Name: USCGC Point Evans (WPB-82354)
- Namesake: Point Evans at Gig Harbor, Washington
- Owner: United States Coast Guard
- Builder: J.M. Martinac Shipbuilding Corp., Tacoma, Washington
- Commissioned: 10 January 1967
- Decommissioned: 1 December 1999
- Fate: Transferred to Philippine Navy

Philippines
- Name: BRP Alberto Navarrete (PC-394)
- Namesake: Alberto Navarrete
- Operator: Philippine Navy
- Acquired: 2001
- Status: in active service

General characteristics
- Type: Patrol Boat (WPB)
- Displacement: 60 tons
- Length: 82 ft 10 in (25.25 m)
- Beam: 17 ft 7 in (5.36 m) max
- Draft: 5 ft 11 in (1.80 m)
- Propulsion: 2 × 800 hp (597 kW) Cummins diesel engines; refit in 1990's with 800 hp Caterpillar diesel.
- Speed: 18 knots (33 km/h; 21 mph)
- Range: 542 nmi (1,004 km) at 14.5 kn (26.9 km/h; 16.7 mph); 1,271 nmi (2,354 km) at 10.7 kn (19.8 km/h; 12.3 mph)
- Complement: Domestic service : 8 men
- Armament: 1967; 1 × Oerlikon 20 mm cannon

BRP Alberto Navarrete (PC-394) is the lead ship of the Alberto Navarrete-class of Coastal Patrol Craft of the Philippine Navy.

Formerly known as USCGC Point Evans (WPB-82354), She was an 82-foot (25 m) Point-class cutter constructed by J.M. Martinac Shipbuilding Corp. at Tacoma, Washington in 1967 for use as a law enforcement and search and rescue patrol boat by the U.S. Coast Guard.

== Design and construction details ==
Point Evans was built to accommodate an 8-man crew. She was powered by two 800 hp (597 kW) VT800 Cummins diesel main drive engines and had two five-bladed 42 in (1.1 m) propellers. Water tank capacity was 1,550 U.S. gallons (5,900 L) and fuel tank capacity was 1,840 U.S. gallons (7,000 L) at 95% full. After 1990 she was refit with 800 hp (597 kW) Caterpillar diesel main drive engines. Engine exhaust was ported through the transom rather than through a conventional stack and this permitted a 360 degree view from the bridge; a feature that was very useful in search and rescue work as well as a combat environment.

The design specifications for Point Evans included a steel hull for durability and an aluminum superstructure and longitudinally framed construction was used to save weight. Ease of operation with a small crew size was possible because of the non-manned main drive engine spaces. Controls and alarms located on the bridge allowed one man operation of the cutter thus eliminating a live engineer watch in the engine room. Because of design, four men could operate the cutter; however, the need for resting watchstanders brought the crew size to eight men for normal domestic service. The screws were designed for ease of replacement and could be changed without removing the cutter from the water. A clutch-in idle speed of three knots helped to conserve fuel on lengthy patrols and an eighteen knot maximum speed could get the cutter on scene quickly. Air-conditioned interior spaces were a part of the original design for the Point class cutter. Interior access to the deckhouse was through a watertight door on the starboard side aft of the deckhouse. The deckhouse contained the cabin for the officer-in-charge and the executive petty officer. The deckhouse also included a small arms locker, scuttlebutt, a small desk and head. Access to the lower deck and engine room was down a ladder. At the bottom of the ladder was the galley, mess and recreation deck. A watertight door at the front of the mess bulkhead led to the main crew quarters which was ten feet long and included six bunks that could be stowed, three bunks on each side. Forward of the bunks was the crew's head complete with a compact sink, shower and commode.

== History ==
=== United States Coast Guard ===
USCGC Point Evans was homeported at Long Beach, California from 1967 to 1992. She was used for law enforcement and search and rescue operations. On 21 February 1970, she helped fight a fire at Rincon, California. On 2 August 1973, she fought a fire on FV Heimark 5 miles offshore from Los Angeles, California. From 1992 to 1999 she was homeported in Kauaʻi, Hawaii replacing USCGC Point Harris which was damaged by Hurricane Iniki. In 1995, she ran aground near Molokini Crater and sustained some hull and propeller damage.

Point Evans appeared in the 1987 film Overboard starring Goldie Hawn and Kurt Russell. She also appeared in the TV series Baywatch Hawaii as well as in the Columbo series, season 7.5 "The Conspirators". She was decommissioned on 1 December 1999 and transferred to the Philippine Navy. The Coast Guard replaced her with USCGC Kittiwake, an 87 ft (27 m) Marine Protector class coastal patrol boat.

=== Philippine Navy ===
After decommissioning, she was transferred to the Philippine Navy in 2001. She was renamed as BRP Alberto Navarrete. In 2009, she was given the stated mission of protecting tourists.
