= USS Curlew (AM-69) =

Minesweeper of the United States Navy

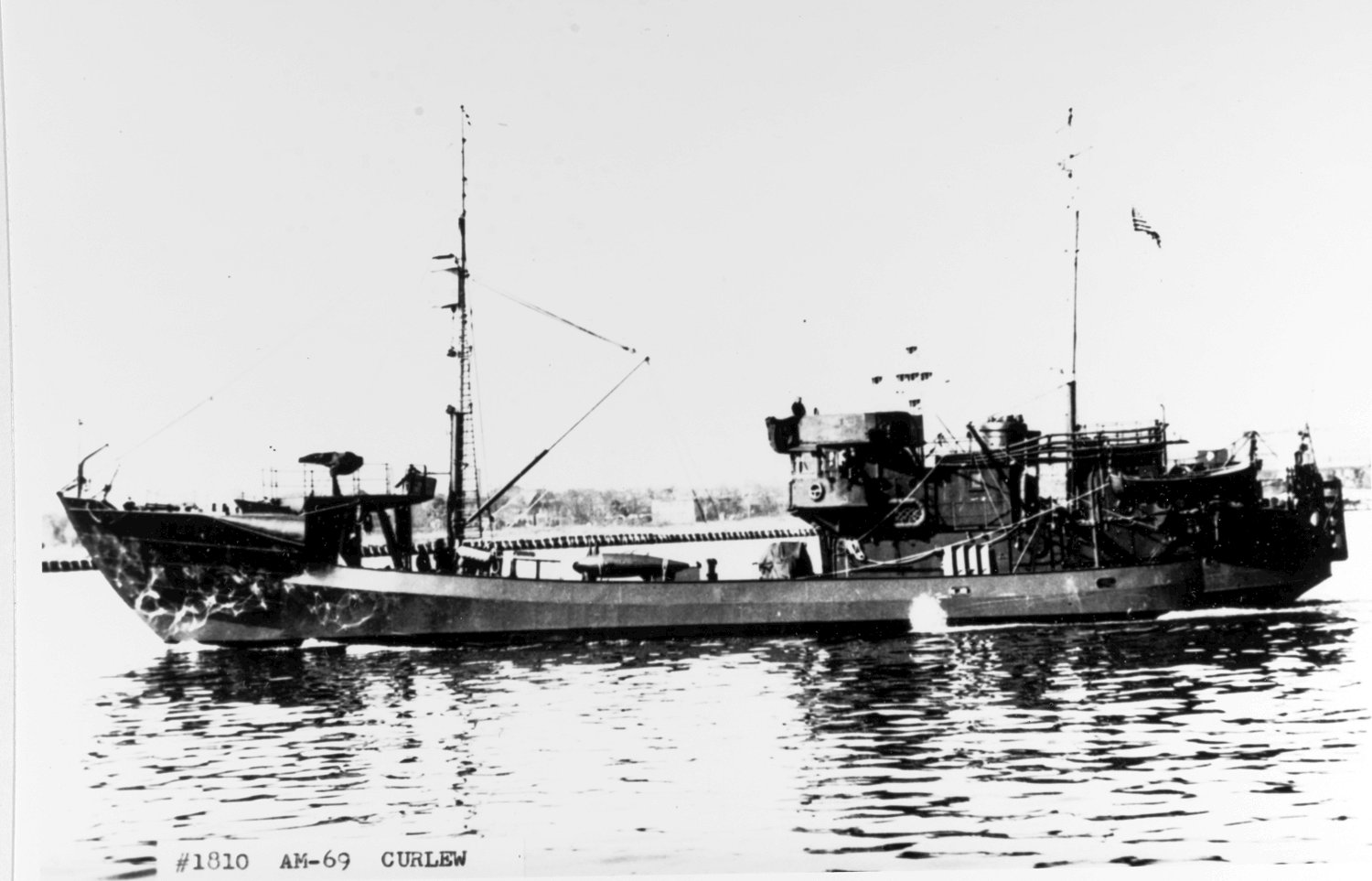
- Curlew underway during World War II

History

United States
- Name: USS Curlew
- Builder: Charleston Shipbuilding and Dry Dock Co., Charleston, South Carolina
- Launched: as MV Kittiwake, 1938
- Acquired: 6 August 1940
- Commissioned: 7 November 1940
- Decommissioned: 5 December 1945
- Renamed: USS Curlew, 14 August 1940
- Reclassified: IX-170, 1 June 1944
- Identification: IMO number: 5143871; MMSI number: 338276000; Callsign: WDA2144
- Fate: Transferred to the Maritime Commission for disposal, 27 September 1946. Converted to fishing vessel.

General characteristics
- Class & type: Catbird-class minesweeper
- Displacement: 570 long tons (579 t)
- Length: 147 ft 10 in (45.06 m)
- Beam: 28 ft 8 in (8.74 m)
- Draft: 12 ft (3.7 m)
- Propulsion: 1 × 575 shp (429 kW) Fairbanks Morse diesel engine; 1 × shaft
- Speed: 10 knots (19 km/h; 12 mph)
- Armament: 1 × 3"/23 caliber gun

The third USS Curlew (AM-69/IX-170) was a Catbird-class minesweeper in the United States Navy during World War II.

Curlew was built in 1938 by Charleston Shipbuilding and Dry Dock Co., Charleston, South Carolina, as Kittiwake; purchased by the U.S. Navy on 6 August 1940; and commissioned 7 November 1940.

== East Coast assignments ==
Clearing Boston 10 May 1941, Curlew swept mines off Staten Island, New York, until 4 October when she put out for Cristóbal, Canal Zone. While it protected the Panama Canal, the ship was commanded by Joe Rollins, later a prominent attorney in Houston, Texas. She served in the 15th Naval District until 10 February 1944 when she reported to Section Base, Little Creek, Virginia, for patrol and minesweeping operations until the end of the war. Re-classified Unclassified Miscellaneous Auxiliary IX-170 on 1 June 1944, she arrived at Newport, Rhode Island 14 November 1945.

== Decommissioning ==
Curlew was decommissioned there 5 December 1945, and transferred to the Maritime Commission 27 September 1946 for disposal.

Curlew was converted into a civilian fishing vessel following her decommissioning, and still serves this role as of 2017, under the name Clipper Express.
