= Pardo's Push =

Air maneuver performed by US Air Force pilot during the Vietnam War

Pardo's Push was an aviation maneuver carried out by then-Captain (Lt Col USAF Ret) John R. "Bob" Pardo (1934–2023), USAF in order to move his wingman's badly damaged F-4 Phantom II to friendly air space during the Vietnam War.

== History ==
Captain Bob Pardo (with weapon systems officer 1st Lt Steve Wayne) and wingman Captain Earl Aman (with weapon systems officer 1st Lt Robert Houghton) were assigned to the 8th Tactical Fighter Wing, 433rd Tactical Fighter Squadron, at Ubon Royal Thai Air Force Base, Thailand. In March 1967, they were trying to attack a steel mill in North Vietnam, just north of Hanoi.

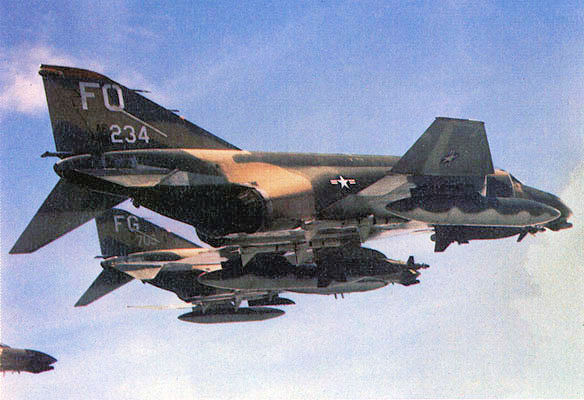
F-4Ds of the 8th Tactical Fighter Wing from Ubon Royal Thai Air Force Base

On March 10, 1967, the sky was clear for a bombing run, but both F-4 Phantom IIs were hit by anti-aircraft fire. Aman's plane took the worst damage; his fuel tank had been hit, and he quickly lost most of his fuel. Aman and Houghton then determined that they did not have enough fuel to make it to a KC-135 tanker aircraft over Laos.

To avoid having Aman and Houghton bail out over hostile territory, Pardo decided to try pushing the airplane. Pardo first tried pushing the plane using Aman's drag chute compartment, but turbulence interfered.

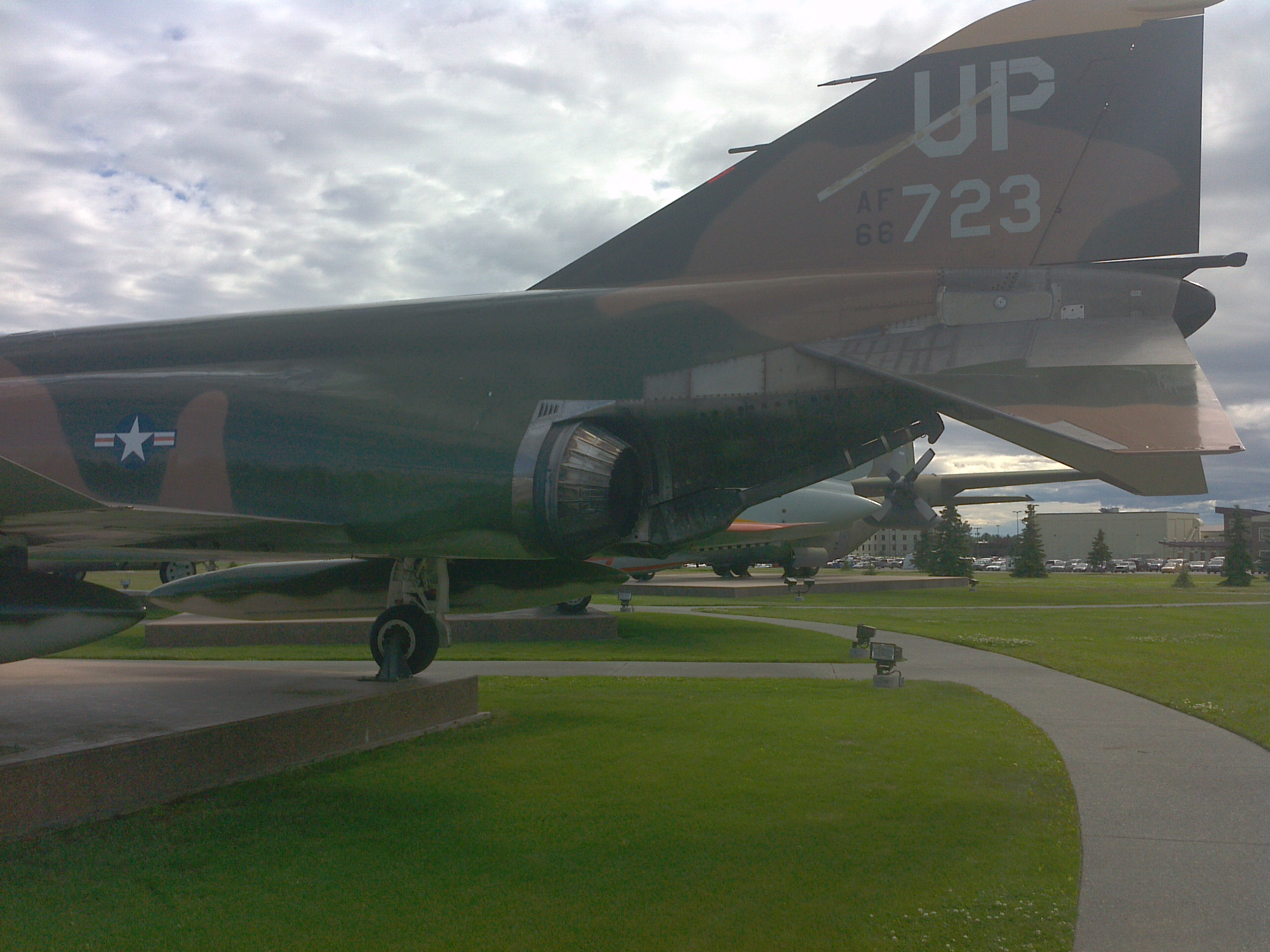
Tailhook (in the raised position) of an F-4C Phantom II on display at Joint Base Elmendorf-Richardson

Pardo then tried to use Aman's tailhook to push the plane. The Phantom, having been originally designed as a naval aircraft for the U.S. Navy and U.S. Marine Corps, was equipped with a heavy duty tailhook for landings aboard aircraft carriers and for emergency arrestments ashore. Aman lowered his tailhook and Pardo moved behind Aman until the tailhook was against Pardo's windscreen. Aman then shut down both of his J79 jet engines. The push worked, reducing the rate of descent considerably, but the tailhook slipped off the windscreen every 15 to 30 seconds, and each time Pardo had to reposition his plane to do it again. Pardo also struggled with a fire in one of his own engines and eventually had to shut it down. In the remaining 10 minutes of flight time, Pardo used the one working engine to slow the descent of both planes.

With Pardo's plane running out of fuel after pushing Aman's plane almost 88 miles (142 km), the planes reached Laotian airspace at an altitude of 6,000 feet (1,800 m). This left them about two minutes of flying time. The pilots and their weapons systems officers ejected, evaded capture, and were picked up by rescue helicopters.

Pardo was initially reprimanded for not saving his own aircraft. However, in 1989, the military re-examined the case and awarded both Pardo and Wayne the Silver Star for the maneuver, two decades after the incident.

== Postscript ==
Pardo and Aman eventually completed their Air Force careers, both retiring in the rank of lieutenant colonel. In later years, Pardo, learning that Aman was suffering from Lou Gehrig's disease and had lost his voice and mobility, created the Earl Aman Foundation that raised enough money to buy Aman a voice synthesizer, a motorized wheelchair, and a computer. The foundation and the Red River Valley Fighter Pilots Association later raised funds to pay for a van, which Aman used for transportation until his death.

Earl Aman died on 15 October 1998. Bob Pardo died on 5 December 2023. Bob Houghton died on 30 April 2026.

== Legacy ==
The flight maneuver was later the subject of an episode of JAG, True Callings; the episode's credits "saluted" Pardo for his courage and ingenuity.

== See also ==
- James Robinson Risner, a pilot who used his F-86 Sabre to push a fellow pilot's plane during the Korean War.
