= Mitchell Kittiwake =

Kittiwake
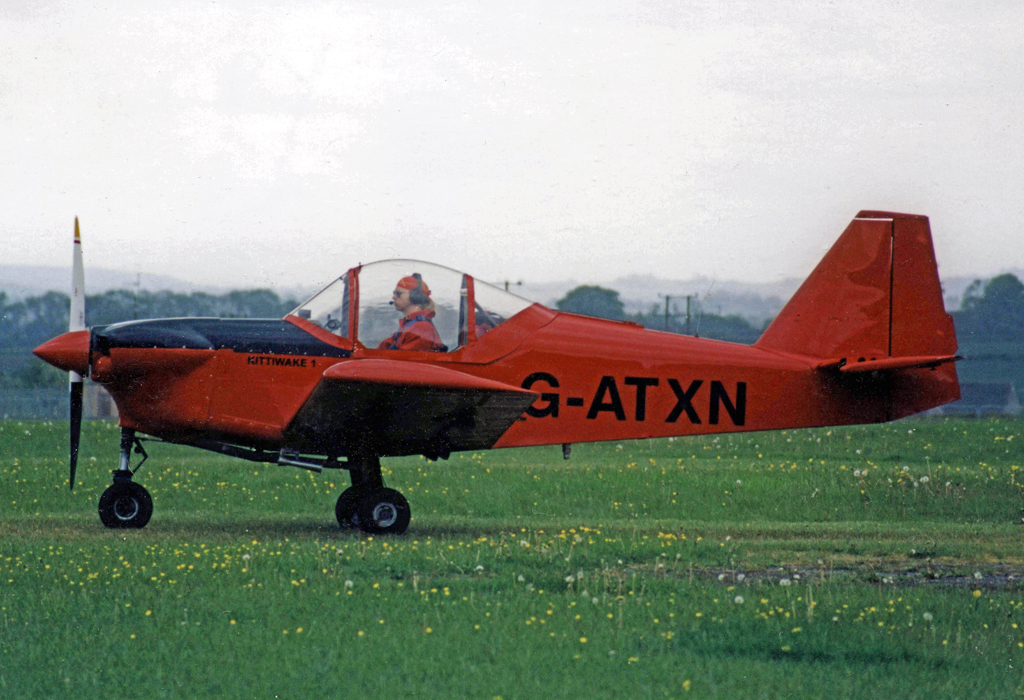
- The prototype Kittiwake 1 attending a rally at RAF Abingdon in 2003

General information
- Type: Sports aircraft
- National origin: United Kingdom
- Manufacturer: Mitchell-Procter Aircraft (prototype Kittiwake I); Robinson Aircraft (prototype Kittiwake II)
- Designer: C. G. B. Mitchell
- Number built: 4

History
- First flight: 23 May 1967
- Variant: Nash Petrel

The Mitchell Kittiwake is a British single engine sporting aircraft designed for amateur building. Plans were available for both single-seat and two-seat versions, but only four were constructed.

== Development ==
Mitchell-Procter Aircraft was set up to produce the Kittwake prototype. This single-seat sports aircraft was a development of the Mitchell-Prizeman Scamp design study that was placed third in the Rollason Midget Racer Competition of 1964. C. G. B. Mitchell was the Kittiwake's designer, with R. G. Procter in charge of building it. The Mitchell-Procter Kittiwake I first flew in May 1967, but about 17 months later the partnership was dissolved and plans for home builders were produced by Procter Aircraft Associates. Mitchell concentrated on the design of a two-seat development, the Mitchell Kittiwake II, with Robinson Aircraft building the prototype. At about the same time Procter Aircraft were designing their own rather larger two-seat Kittiwake I development, the Procter Petrel. Both the two seaters, like the Kittiwake I, were intended for home building.

The single-seat Kittiwake I monoplane was designed for sports flying and as a glider tug. It is an all-metal aircraft, with low cantilever wings of parallel chord built around a single spar carrying 5° of dihedral. NACA single slotted flaps occupy the whole of the trailing edge inboard of the ailerons. The wings attach to a centre section which is integral with the fuselage, a feature intended to help construction in a small space like a garage. The straight tapered fin carries a horn balanced rudder and the constant chord tailplane has a starboard side trim tab.

The Kittiwake's fuselage is built around four longerons, with flat sides and bottom and single curvature decking. Its overwing cockpit has a rearward sliding canopy and its fixed tricycle undercarriage has cantilever angled steel spring main legs attached to the lower longerons, giving a track of 5 ft 9 in (1.75 m). The Kittiwake I was powered by a 100 hp (75 kW) Continental O-200 flat four engine.

The Kittiwake II differs chiefly in having two side-by-side seating and a more powerful 130 hp (97 kW) Continental O-240. It is longer, heavier and has an increased span which increases the wing area by about 8%. The fuselage is wider and the small dorsal fillet of the Kittiwake I gone; the rudder gained a trim tab and the elevators full width tabs. It first flew on 19 March 1972.

== Operational history ==
In addition to the prototype, two Kittiwake Is were built, one by Royal Navy apprentices in 1971 for glider towing. For this role a larger diameter (6 ft 4 in, 1.93 m) propeller is fitted, increasing the rate of climb by 24%. A tow release hook is fitted under the tail. Only one Kittiwake II, the prototype, was built.

== Survivors ==
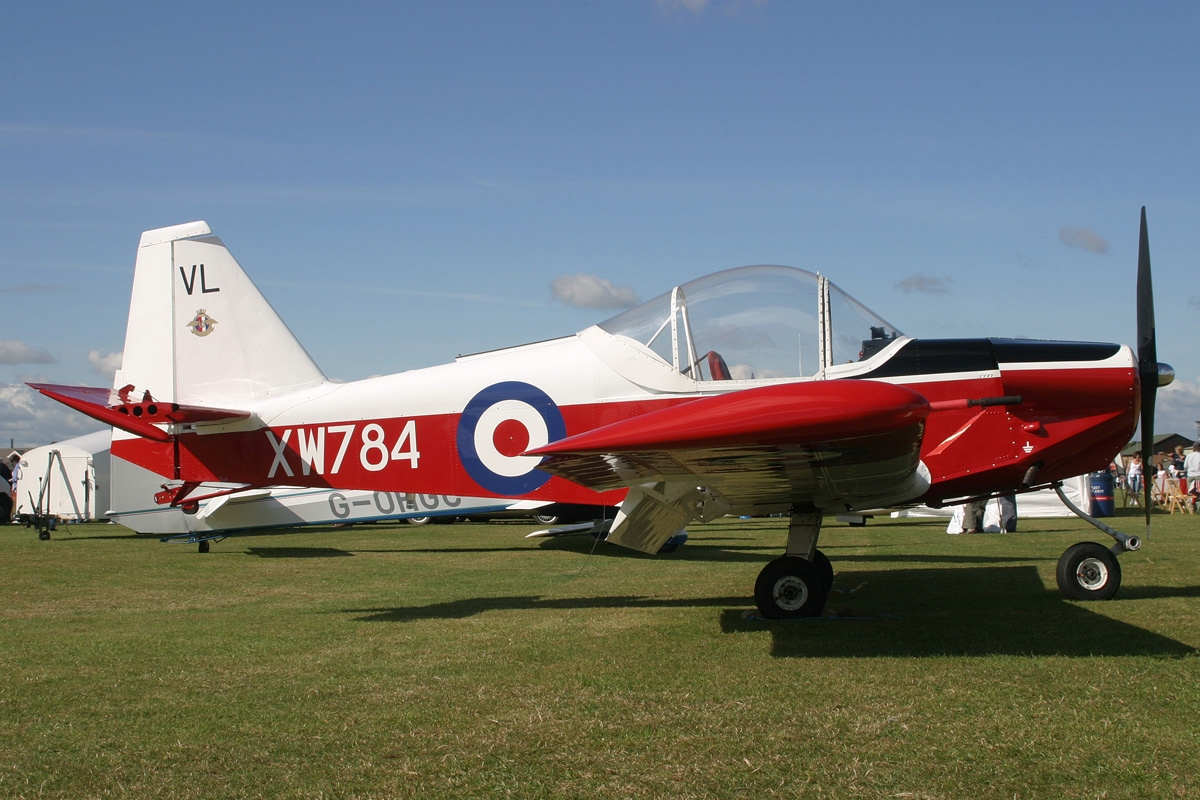
Mitchell-Proctor Kittiwake 1

One Kittiwake was active until at least at 2005 and the other is still active. They remain on the UK Civil Register. These are the prototype, G-ATXN and the ex-Naval G-BBRN. The latter is painted, as in its Naval days, as XW784.

== Specifications (Kittiwake I) ==
Data from Jane's all the World's Aircraft 1970.

General characteristics

- Crew: 1
- Length: 19 ft 7 in (5.97 m)
- Wingspan: 24 ft 0 in (7.32 m)
- Height: 7 ft 6 in (2.29 m)
- Wing area: 105 sq ft (9.8 m^{2})
- Empty weight: 910 lb (413 kg)
- Gross weight: 1,250 lb (567 kg) for aerobatic flight
- Max takeoff weight: 1,350 lb (612 kg)
- Powerplant: 1 × Rolls-Royce/Continental O-200-A 4-cylinder horizontally opposed air cooled piston, 100 hp (75 kW)
- Propellers: 2-bladed McCauley 69CM52, 5 ft 9 in (1.75 m) diameter metal, fixed pitch; larger propeller fitted for glider towing.

Performance

- Maximum speed: 131 mph (211 km/h, 114 kn)
- Cruise speed: 122 mph (196 km/h, 106 kn) at 75% power
- Range: 540 mi (870 km, 470 nmi) at 92 mph (148 km/h)
- Rate of climb: 850 ft/min (4.3 m/s)
