= HaMisrad =

- Also known as: The Office
- Genre: Mockumentary; Comedy
- Created by: Ricky Gervais; Stephen Merchant
- Starring: Dvir Benedek; Maayan Blum; Eldad Fribas; Mali Levi; Amir Wolf; Noa Wolman; Ayelet Robinson; Jamil Khoury; Dima Ross; Yossi Wassa; Roberto Pollack
- Country of origin: Israel
- Original language: Hebrew
- No. of seasons: 2
- No. of episodes: 30

Production
- Camera setup: Single-camera
- Running time: 25 minutes
- Production companies: Capital United Nations Entertainment; The Identity Company

Original release
- Network: Yes Comedy
- Release: August 10, 2010 – October 3, 2013

Related
- The Office (British TV series)

HaMisrad (Hebrew: המשרד, "The Office") is an Israeli television sitcom, that aired on the Yes Comedy channel. It is a version of The Office, a 2001–2003 British sitcom that had already been remade in nine other countries. HaMisrad is a mockumentary set in a branch of the fictional "Paper Office" (in English) office supplies company, in the industrial city of Yehud. The series stars Dvir Benedek as Avi Meshulam, the branch's regional manager, a character based heavily on the character of David Brent in the original series. It is co-produced by Yes and July August Productions.

Like the original series and many of its spinoffs, HaMisrad lampoons office life as well as gender and ethnic relations. In the case of HaMisrad, the office and warehouse include native-born secular Jews, Arabs, Orthodox Jews, and Russian and Ethiopian immigrants.

The first season aired from August to November 2010. Most of the episodes in the first season were based on the 12 episodes from the British series. Many of the early episodes featured identical plots and some of the same dialogue, though as the season went on the episodes' plots diverged increasingly from the originals.

A second season aired in late 2012 and early 2013. It contained all original plots.

The series is broadcast in HD.

== Production ==
The series' writer is Uzi Weil, and the director is Eitan Tzur. Both are Israeli television veterans, who had both previously written and directed for BeTipul, an Israeli drama series that was itself adapted in various countries, including the American series In Treatment.

HaMisrad was created with the approval of the British series' co-creators, Ricky Gervais (who starred in the original) and Stephen Merchant. Gervais, when asked about the Israeli series after it was first announced in early 2009, said he was "thrilled" about the idea, adding wryly, "who ever heard of Jewish entertainers?"

By agreement with the BBC, the main characters had to match the main characters of the UK series, and the first three episodes had to correspond to the UK series' first three episodes. Weill decided to pattern the series even more closely than required on the original UK series, because he felt it was "an official satire" which "had a lot to say about the world and about people." By contrast, Weill did not want to emulate the American version, which he considered "a parody about funny people in a funny place with a lot of feel-good factors thrown in." Weill described his approach to adapting the source material as "In an English or American office, you would keep your views to yourself, but here, all the racial and religious aspects of our lives are out in the open. We’re constantly talking about it – it's why you come to work! So to create an embarrassing situation, you have to take it further comedy-wise. It's not based on 'what would happen if I say this totally horrible thing' because I've already said it. Instead, it's 'what will happen after I say it?'"

== Characters ==
- Avi Meshulam (Dvir Benedek) – Regional Manager. An obnoxious, overweight and dimwitted boss who tries unsuccessfully to ingratiate himself with his employees. (Based on David Brent.)
- Yariv Shauli (Maayan Blum) – Assistant to the Regional Manager. A proud veteran of what he refers to as a secret branch of the Israeli Army, who is extremely loyal to Meshulam and tries hard to maintain office discipline. (Based on Gareth Keenan.)
- Yossi (Eldad Fribas) – Senior Sales Representative. Sarcastic and underachieving, with a long-term unrequited crush on Dana. (Based on Tim Canterbury.)
- Dana (Mali Levi) – Receptionist. A generally optimistic person, stuck in a job and a long-term engagement, neither of which she's happy with. (Based on Dawn Tinsley.)
- Lavi (Alon Hamawi) – Dana's fiancé, who works in the company warehouse. Macho and often insensitive. (Based on Lee.)
- Shimi Guetta (Shai Avivi) – Travelling Sales Representative. Obnoxious, bullying, and prone to insulting jokes. (Based on Chris Finch.)
- Yelena (Helena Yaralova) – Corporate Supervisor. Avi's boss, and a Russian immigrant who is straitlaced and business-focused. (Based on Jennifer Taylor-Clarke.)
- Karol (Roberto Pollack) – Accountant. A lecherous, cynical Romanian immigrant who hates his wife.
- Yevgeni (Dima Ross) – Accountant. A socially awkward Russian immigrant. (Based on Keith Bishop.)
- Leah (Ayelet Robinson) – Office worker. A seemingly perpetually pregnant Orthodox Jew who is very opinionated.
- Abed (Jamil Khoury) – Sales representative. A gay Israeli Arab who is assimilated into Israeli society but feels alienated (Based on Oscar Martinez from the US adaptation).
- Ababa (Avi) Sharon (Yossi Vassa) – Accountant, merged in from the Kiryat Ono branch. An Israeli-born Ethiopian Jew. Mild-mannered, and dislikes being viewed as different. (Based on Oliver.)
- Riki (Hilla Sarjon) – Office worker, merged in from the Kiryat Ono branch. A woman who uses a wheelchair and is aggressively looking for love. (Based on both Brenda and Trudy.)
- Regev Steiner (Amir Wolf) – the temp. Is descended from the Rothschilds and is somewhat contemptuous of the rest of the office. (Based on Ricky.)
- Shiri (Noa Wollman) – new office worker. Fun-loving and ditzy. (Based on both Donna and Rachel.)
- Sammy (Yaniv Suissa) – Warehouse Foreman. Very dismissive of Avi. (Based on Taffy.)

== List of episodes ==
=== Season one ===
- Episode 1 – The staff is introduced; Yelena informs Avi that the branch may be closed down. (Based on Episode 1 of the UK Office, "Downsize".)
- Episode 2 – Rumors of the potential branch closing continue; Avi introduces new office worker Shiri; a pornographic email leads to an investigation. (Based on Episode 2 of the UK Office, "Work Experience".)
- Episode 3 – It is Yossi's 30th birthday; some of the staff attend a quiz night. (Based on Episode 3 of the UK Office, "The Quiz".)
- Episode 4 – News of a military incursion into Gaza has the office on edge; Leah suspects Abed is talking to the enemy.
- Episode 5 – An outside facilitator holds a training session about customer relations; Avi reminisces about his musical past. (Based on Episode 4 of the UK Office, "Training".)
- Episode 6 – Avi hires a personal secretary; some of the office staff go out to a bar. (Based on Episode 5 of the UK Office, "New Girl".)
- Episode 7 – Yariv finds out that Abed is gay; Abed preemptively tells the entire office, and introduces his boyfriend; Avi is pressured by Yelena to fire his new secretary, who then accuses him of sexual harassment; Avi then manages to successfully (but wrongfully) accuse her of leaking company secrets, which ends the internal investigation.
- Episode 8 – Yelena informs Avi that his branch will be shut down in favor of the Kiryat Ono branch, but that Avi himself will get a promotion; Avi tells the staff, who are dispirited at the news. Yelena then convinces Avi to trick his employees into signing away their rights to a hefty severance package (which Avi had previously incorrectly given them). Avi's former secretary decides to press a criminal sexual harassment charge against Avi, which causes the company to decide to fire Avi instead. After Yelena tells him the news, Avi puts the signed release forms in the shredder instead of handing them over to her, which forces the company to keep the Yehud branch and terminate the Kiryat Ono one instead. (Loosely based on Episode 6 of the UK Office, "Judgment".)
- Episode 9 – Two employees of the closed Kiryat Ono branch who have been merged into the office are introduced: Riki and the Ethiopian Avi (whom Avi the boss insists on calling "Ababa", his original name). Avi the boss tells a racially offensive joke, which causes a staff complaint; there is an altercation between Lavi and Yossi. (Based on Episode 7 of the UK Office, "Merger".)
- Episode 10 – Yelena tells Avi that she has been secretly giving consulting advice to another company, against company rules, and asks Avi to keep it a secret; Lavi apologizes to Yossi for hitting him; the staff are required to give appraisals of their own work, as well as of Avi; lukewarm appraisals of Avi from the two new employees cause him to take them out to lunch in order to try to gain their approval, but the lunch goes poorly; Shiri begins openly flirting with Yossi; Yelena promises to deliver positive news about Avi's feedback in return for his silence. (Loosely based on Episode 8 of the UK Office, "Appraisals".)
- Episode 11 – Avi is asked to speak at a motivational seminar, then brags to the office about how much he will be making; Yevgeny begins publishing heavily on Twitter in order to win a "Twitter of the month" contest, and most of his "tweets" are embarrassing facts about Avi; the office has a fire drill, during which Avi and Yariv leave Riki in the stairwell, then forget about her for the rest of the day; Yevgeny wins the contest, which causes Yariv to start publishing heavily on Twitter as well, revealing embarrassing information about other co-workers, as well as company secrets; Yelena tries (unsuccessfully) to pressure Avi to fire Yariv as a result; Yossi begins dating Shiri, which makes Dana uncomfortable. (Very loosely based on Episode 9 of the UK Office, "Party"; fire drill plot based on Episode 8.)
- Episode 12 – Yariv bonds with the visiting computer geek; Avi and Dana travel so that Avi can present at a motivational seminar, where he gives a rambling talk that bewilders the audience. (Based on Episode 10 of the UK Office, "Motivation".)
- Episode 13 – Dana breaks up with Lavi over his refusal to set a wedding date; Avi plans an office-wide production for Purim (which he calls "the most important Jewish holiday"), featuring comedy and dance; Avi indirectly causes Leah to eat a (non-kosher) cheeseburger, which she then tries to throw up; Yossi breaks up with Shiri; Yelena fires Avi over his inability to put together a productivity plan; Avi tells the staff he was fired, then holes up in his office, leaving only after everyone else has gone. (Loosely based on Episode 11 of the UK Office, "Charity".)
- Episode 14 – Avi, still at the office for the duration of the week, is in good spirits about his planned next ventures: a motivational-speaking career and a motivational book he's co-writing with a female journalist. Yelena asks Yossi to become the new manager, but he turns it down, saying he's leaving the company to become a student. With no other options, Yelena asks Yariv to become the new manager instead. Dana decides to leave as well, in order to study painting; Yossi suggests to Dana that they get an apartment together, since they're both looking for a new place, and Dana agrees. At the farewell party for Avi at a bar that night, Avi alienates his journalist co-author, and finds out that the motivational-speaking company is not interested in employing him. (Loosely based on Episode 12 of the UK Office, "Interview".)
- Episode 15 – It is around two weeks later, and Avi is an unsuccessful travelling salesman, living out of his car. He visits the office, but gets little reaction, and Yariv informs him that he has gotten a raise over Avi's old salary. Dana and Yossi are both still at the office, near the end of their two weeks' notice. Regev goes into Yariv's office to complain about Yariv's sexual harassment of Shiri, they get into an argument and Yariv fires Regev. Yariv then also fires Ababa and Sami in quick succession when he feels a lack of respect from both of them. Yelena finds out about the firings, then un-fires the three and demotes Yariv back to his old position. She finds Avi sleeping in his car in the parking lot, and asks him to become the manager again; Avi enthusiastically agrees. Lavi, contrite over the breakup with Dana, re-proposes to Dana in the office, promising to treat her better; Dana accepts. While the staff celebrates, Avi returns with his own good news; Yossi then walks in, sees Dana together with Lavi, and slinks out of the office.

=== Season two ===
- Episode 1 - It is revealed that Yossi has quit; a photo of Avi soliciting a prostitute ends up in an online news article; Avi claims that he was only in the area to get treatment for a bad shoulder, and starts to wear a shoulder harness to keep up appearances; Shiri and Regev have split up; a new salesman, Motti, arrives, and tries hard to ingratiate himself with every member of the staff; Regev, annoyed that no one else sees through Motti's scheming, quits.
- Episode 2 - Yossi, now a student, applies for Regev's old job and is hired; Yariv, upset at the way he feels that the film crew are portraying the office in a negative light, decides to film his own documentary of life at the office and upload the videos to Facebook; Shimi and Riki are revealed to be carrying on a secret affair.
- Episode 3 - Dana gets a publisher to accept her children's book, but Lavi manages to ruin the deal after he becomes her "literary agent"; Yariv asks for a promotion to assistant regional manager, but Motti tricks Yariv into sabotaging his chances by seeming to be conspiring to replace Avi, and Avi promotes Motti instead to the position.
- Episode 4 - Avi tries to get his band back together, and they rehearse at the office and film a new music video, but the video is rejected by the TV stations and the band breaks up; a new warehouse worker, Andrei, does poorly in his military exam and tries to kill himself; Sami brings a female friend of his to have sex with Andrei.
- Episode 5 - A bottle episode. Avi has decided to become a stand-up comedian, and has hired real-life comedian Dov Navon (playing himself) to help him with his material. The two head to the office's bomb shelter to work on jokes, but the door to the shelter accidentally closes, locking them (and the cameraman) in together for the rest of the episode.
- Episode 6 - Abed is arrested because his (now ex-)boyfriend falsely accused him to the police of being a pedophile, which leads the other employees to again suspect the worst of him; Riki breaks up with Shimi due to his unwillingness to publicly announce their relationship; Shimi barges into an office meeting to announce that Riki is a good lover, but it is not enough to convince her to get back together; Yossi brings his new girlfriend, Tal (Yael Bar Zohar) to the office, and everyone is struck by her similarity to Yael Bar Zohar.
- Episode 7 - Shiri has been sniffing cocaine at the office via a nasal spray; Yariv borrows her nasal spray because he is suffering from a cold, becomes a star salesman as a result of unknowingly taking cocaine, but gets hooked; Dana brings her nephew to the warehouse for Lavi to take care of, and Lavi, due to his opinion that children require boundaries, ends up locking the nephew in a supply closet; Shimi ever more desperately tries to woo Riki back, but without success.
- Episode 8 - Avi loses the firm's #1 client. In order to appease Yelena, Avi tells her that they have a big upcoming deal with the army, and hires a female stripper dressed as a soldier to show up to the office, posing as an army representative. Yelena returns to the office unexpectedly and finds that the stripper is now performing for everyone. Motti tells the management board about the stripping incident in order to get Avi fired. Avi and Yariv, suspecting that Yelena told the board, decide to spy on her, and Avi finds out that Motti has been blackmailing Yelena and a board member, with whom she previously had an affair, with the goal of being named office manager. Avi and Shiri come up with a plan to make Motti look like an attempted rapist; Motti falls for it, then resigns.
- Episode 9 - Avi's father is released from the hospital; Avi hires a Filipina nurse, Tina, to take care of him, but, because her salary is paid for by the company, Avi decides that they should both be at the warehouse; Sami takes advantage of the situation by "outsourcing" all of the warehouse work to Tina; Riki finally agrees to take Shimi back; Leah decides to emulate Shiri's free-spiritedness and tries to arrange a romantic weekend getaway with her husband, but the attempt is unsuccessful.
- Episode 10 - Yossi discovers Shirley (played by Maayan Blum), an employee at the company "Paper Internet" in the same building, who appears to be the female equivalent of Yariv, and tries to set up the two, but Yariv dislikes Shirley; Lavi and Sami continue to take advantage of Tina; Leah and Shiri commiserate further over their unsuccessful (in opposite ways) love lives; Avi's father helps Sami with his side business of selling sniffing glue by dealing it to his former nursing home co-residents.
- Episode 11 - Lavi, feeling unfulfilled, begins having sex with Tina, giving her work breaks as compensation; Ababa's mother visits the office, and it is revealed that Ababa is distant from his family; Leah is more despondent than ever about her husband, and Shiri manages to cheer her up by slipping ecstasy into her bottled water.

== Reception ==
Critics were overall very positive about the first season of HaMisrad. Entertainment writer Aviad Pohoryles of Maariv called the final episode of the season excellent, and said that it provided a worthy response to those who have criticized the importing of non-Israeli television formats.

Reviewers Udi Hirsch and Inav Schiff of Israeli web portal Walla! called the show the best thing on Israeli television in 2010, and singled out for praise the performances of Dvir Benedek and Mali Levi; the skewering of mainstream Israelis' views of minorities such as Arabs, gays and the handicapped; and the dialogue, which the reviewers wrote accurately captured the cliches of Israeli society, corporate culture and internet culture.

Reception was more mixed about the second season. Ami Friedman of Maariv wrote that the second season's situations were too unrealistic, and more worthy of an animated sitcom such as South Park, although he praised the acting and dialogue.
