= List of awards and nominations received by Ricky Gervais =

Ricky Gervais awards and nominations
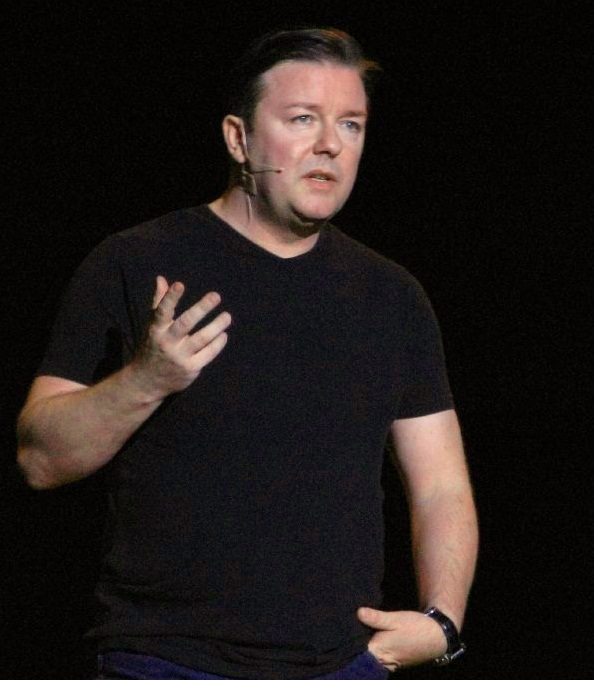
- Gervais in 2007
Awards and nominations
Award	Wins	Nominations
Primetime Emmy Awards	2	23
Golden Globe Awards	5	10
BAFTA Awards	7	10

Totals (Note: Certain award groups do not simply award one winner. They acknowledge several different recipients, have runners-up, and have third place. Since this is a specific recognition and is different from losing an award, runner-up mentions are considered wins in this award tally. For simplification and to avoid errors, each award in this list has been presumed to have had a prior nomination.)
- Wins: 13
- Nominations: 43

Ricky Gervais (/dʒərˈveɪz/ jər-VAYZ; born 25 June 1961) is an English comedian, actor, writer, television producer, and filmmaker. He is best known for co-creating, writing, and acting in the British television series The Office (2001–2003). He has won seven British Academy Television Awards, five National Comedy Awards, two Primetime Emmy Awards, five Golden Globe Awards, and the Rose d'Or. In 2007, he was placed at No. 11 on Channel 4's 100 Greatest Stand-Ups and at No. 3 on the updated 2010 list. In 2010, he was named on the Time 100 list of the world's most influential people. In 2002 he was nominated to be Britain's Funniest Man but did not win the award.

== Major awards ==
=== Primetime Emmy Awards ===
Year	Category	Work	Result	Ref.
2005	Outstanding Writing for a Miniseries, Movie or a Dramatic Special	The Office Christmas specials	Nominated	
2006	Outstanding Comedy Series	The Office	Won	
2006	Outstanding Writing for a Comedy Series	Extras	Nominated	
2007	Outstanding Comedy Series	The Office	Nominated	
2007	Outstanding Lead Actor in a Comedy Series	Extras	Won	
2007	Outstanding Directing for a Comedy Series	Extras	Nominated	
2007	Outstanding Writing for a Comedy Series	Extras	Nominated	
2008	Outstanding Comedy Series	The Office	Nominated	
2008	Outstanding Television Movie	Extras: The Extra Special Series Finale	Nominated	
2008	Outstanding Lead Actor in a Miniseries or a Movie	Extras: The Extra Special Series Finale	Nominated	
2008	Outstanding Directing for a Miniseries, Movie or a Dramatic Special	Extras: The Extra Special Series Finale	Nominated	
2008	Outstanding Writing for a Miniseries, Movie or a Dramatic Special	Extras: The Extra Special Series Finale	Nominated	
2009	Outstanding Comedy Series	The Office	Nominated	
2009	Outstanding Variety, Music, or Comedy Special	Ricky Gervais: Out of England - The Stand-Up Special	Nominated	
2009	Outstanding Writing for a Variety, Music or Comedy Special	Ricky Gervais: Out of England - The Stand-Up Special	Nominated	
2010	Outstanding Comedy Series	The Office	Nominated	
2010	Outstanding Animated Program	The Ricky Gervais Show	Nominated	
2011	Outstanding Comedy Series	The Office	Nominated	
2011	Outstanding Special Class Program	The 68th Annual Golden Globe Awards	Nominated	
2012	Outstanding Special Class Program	The 69th Annual Golden Globe Awards	Nominated	
2014	Outstanding Lead Actor in a Comedy Series	Derek	Nominated	
2015	Outstanding Lead Actor in a Miniseries or a Movie	Derek: The Special	Nominated	
2016	Outstanding Special Class Program	The 73rd Annual Golden Globe Awards	Nominated	
2020	Outstanding Special Class Program	The 77th Annual Golden Globe Awards	Nominated	

=== Golden Globe Awards ===
Year	Category	Work	Result	Ref.
2003	Best Television Series – Musical or Comedy	The Office	Won	
2003	Best Actor – Television Series Musical or Comedy	The Office	Won	
2006	Best Television Series – Musical or Comedy	The Office	Nominated	
2007	Best Television Series – Musical or Comedy	Extras	Won	
2007	Best Actor – Television Series Musical or Comedy	Extras	Nominated	
2008	Best Television Series – Musical or Comedy	The Office (US)	Nominated	
2009	Best Television Series – Musical or Comedy	The Office (US)	Nominated	
2014	Best Actor – Television Series Musical or Comedy	Derek	Nominated	
2024	Best Performance in Stand-Up Comedy on Television	Ricky Gervais: Armageddon	Won	
2026	Best Performance in Stand-Up Comedy on Television	Ricky Gervais: Mortality	Won	

=== BAFTA Television Awards ===
Year	Category	Work	Result	Ref.
2002	Best Situation Comedy	The Office	Won	
2002	Best Comedy Performance	The Office	Won	
2003	Best Situation Comedy	The Office	Won	
2003	Best Comedy Performance	The Office	Won	
2004	Best Comedy Performance	The Office	Won	
2004	Best Writer	The Office	Nominated	
2006	Best Situation Comedy	Extras	Won	
2006	Best Comedy Performance	Extras	Won	
2007	Best Situation Comedy	Extras	Nominated	
2007	Best Writer	Extras	Nominated	

=== Screen Actors Guild Awards ===
Year	Category	Work	Result	Ref.
2008	Outstanding Performance by a Male Actor in a Comedy Series	Extras	Nominated	

=== Writers Guild of America Awards ===
Year	Category	Work	Result	Ref.
2006	Television: Comedy Series	The Office	Nominated	
2006	Television: New Series	The Office	Nominated	
2007	Television: Comedy Series	The Office	Won	
2017	Comedy/Variety (Music, Awards, Tributes) – Specials	73rd Golden Globe Awards	Nominated	

=== Producers Guild of America Awards ===
Year	Category	Work	Result	Ref.
2007	Best Episodic Comedy	Extras	Nominated	

== Other awards ==
=== Britannia Awards ===
Year	Category	Result	Ref.
2016	Charlie Chaplin Award for Excellence in Comedy	Won	

=== British Comedy Guide Awards ===
Year	Category	Work	Result	Ref.
2019	Best New TV Sitcom	After Life	Won	
2020	Best Returning TV Comedy	After Life	Won	
2020	Comedy of the Year	After Life	Won	

=== British Comedy Awards ===
Year	Category	Work	Result	Ref.
2002	Best Comedy Actor	The Office	Won	
2004	Best TV Comedy Actor	The Office	Nominated	
2005	Best TV Comedy	Extras	Nominated	
2005	Best New TV Comedy	Extras	Nominated	
2005	Best TV Comedy Actor	Extras	Nominated	
2006	Best TV Comedy	Extras	Nominated	
2006	Best TV Comedy Actor	Extras	Nominated	
2008	Best TV Comedy Actor	Extras	Won	

=== Broadcasting Press Guild Awards ===
Year	Category	Work	Result	Ref.
2002	Writers Award	The Office	Won	
2003	Writers Award	The Office	Won	
2006	Best Comedy/Entertainment	Extras	Nominated	
2008	Best Comedy/Entertainment	Extras	Nominated	
2008	Writers Award	Extras	Nominated	
2012	Best Multichannel Program	Extras	Nominated	

=== National Television Awards ===
Year	Category	Work	Result	Ref.
2021	Best Sitcom	After Life	Won	

=== Evening Standard British Film Awards ===
Year	Category	Work	Result	Ref.
2010	Peter Sellers Award for Comedy	The Invention of Lying	Nominated	

=== Satellite Award ===
Year	Category	Work	Result	Ref.
2007	Best Actor in a Motion Picture Comedy	Ghost Town	Won	
2008	Best Actor in a Series, Comedy	Extras	Nominated	
2020	Best Actor in a Series, Comedy	After Life	Nominated	

=== Television Critics Association Awards ===
Year	Category	Work	Result	Ref.
2004	Individual Achievement in Comedy	The Office	Won	
