= The Office =

International series of mockumentary sitcoms

Title cards for the British original (top) and American version (bottom)

The Office is the title of several mockumentary sitcoms based on a British series originally created by Stephen Merchant and Ricky Gervais as The Office in 2001. The original series also starred Gervais as manager and primary character David Brent. The two series were broadcast on BBC Two in 2001 and 2002, totalling 12 episodes, with two special episodes concluding the series in 2003. A follow up movie (David Brent: Life on the Road) starring Gervais and featuring his David Brent character was released in 2016.

Versions of the original were subsequently made in Germany, the United States, and many other countries. The longest-running version of the series, the American adaptation, ran for nine seasons on the NBC Television Network from 2005 to 2013, with a total of 201 episodes. According to Nielsen Ratings as of April 2019, the American version of The Office was the No. 1 streamed show on Netflix in the United States. A follow-up to the American version, The Paper, premiered on Peacock on September 4, 2025. In 2024, Amazon Prime Video debuted an Australian version of The Office, featuring the franchise’s first female lead character. It was cancelled after one season in October 2025.

== Versions ==
Country/Region	Title	Network	Original run
Australia	The Office	Amazon Prime Video	18 October 2024
Canada	La Job	Bell Satellite TV; Ici Radio-Canada Télé; Ici ARTV	9 October 2006 – 15 January 2007
Chile	La Ofis	Canal 13	6 August 2008 – 22 November 2008
Czech Republic	Kancl	ČT1	1 December 2014 – 17 December 2014
Finland	Konttori	Nelonen	3 March 2017 – 15 February 2019
France	Le Bureau	Canal+	25 May 2006 – 30 June 2006
Germany	Stromberg (Note: Unlike the other derivatives, Stromberg, the German version, was not an official adaptation of the original series but merely inspired by it. The BBC threatened legal action against the series, and a compromise was reached that Ricky Gervais and Stephen Merchant would receive credits in the German version.)	ProSieben	11 October 2004 – 31 January 2012
India	The Office	Hotstar	28 June 2019 – 15 September 2019
Israel	HaMisrad	yes Comedy	10 August 2010 – 3 October 2013
Mexico	La oficina	Amazon Prime Video	13 March 2026 – present
Poland	The Office PL	Canal+	22 October 2021 – present
Saudi Arabia	Al Maktab	MBC	28 October 2022 – 6 January 2023
South Africa	Die Kantoor	kykNET	18 January 2026 – present
Sweden	Kontoret	TV4	12 February 2012 – 17 March 2013
United Kingdom	The Office	BBC Two	9 July 2001 – 27 December 2003
United States	The Office	NBC	24 March 2005 – 16 May 2013
United States	The Paper	Peacock	4 September 2025 – present

On the Swedish series, Kontoret, it can be particularly noted that it was made as a combined remake as well as a spin-off, since the part as head of the office was given to the obnoxious character Ove Sundberg from the established Swedish TV series Solsidan. Actor Henrik Dorsin, who plays the character, stated in an interview, "it feels good to contribute with something of my own, Ove that is, when you're supposed to work with a well established material such as The office. So that it doesn't just become repetition. Furthermore, it's fun to take part in the first combined remake and spin-off ever in Sweden, or maybe even in the world? A spin-make. Or a re-off."

=== Spin-offs ===
Country/Region	Title	Network	Original run
Germany	Stromberg – Der Film	Theatrical release	20 February 2014
United Kingdom	David Brent: Life on the Road	Theatrical release	19 August 2016

=== Unproduced versions ===
Additional versions of the show have been planned but never released. A Russian language version for Channel One with an initial run of 24 episodes was announced in 2008, but had not begun production by 2018. Additionally, Ricky Gervais announced plans to create a Chinese language version of the show in 2010, but the show also had not begun production as of 2018.

== Counterparts ==
Roles are recorded as of each character's first appearance.

	English-language			German-language	French-language		Spanish-language		Hebrew-language	Swedish-language	Czech-language	Finnish-language	Hindi-language	Polish-language	Arabic-language	Afrikaans-language
	(Australia)	(United Kingdom)	(United States)	(Germany)	(France)	(Canada)	(Chile)	(Mexico)	(Israel)	(Sweden)	(Czech Republic)	(Finland)	(India)	(Poland)	(Saudi Arabia)	(South Africa)
Name	The Office	The Office	The Office	Stromberg	Le Bureau ("The Office")	La Job ("The Job")	La ofis ("The Office")	La oficina ("The Office")	HaMisrad ("המשרד", "The Office")	Kontoret ("The Office")	Kancl ("The Office")	Konttori ("The Office")	The Office	The Office PL	Al-Maktab ("المكتب", "The Office")	Die Kantoor ("The Office")
Firm	Flinley Craddick	Wernham Hogg	Dunder Mifflin (Note: From Mid-Season 6 to the conclusion of Season 8, Dunder Mifflin was a subsidiary of Sabre – a printer company. During this time, Dunder Mifflin also sold Sabre printer and printing supplies)	Capitol-Versicherung AG	Cogirep	Les Papiers Jennings	Papeles Lozano	Jabones Olimpo	פייפר אופיס (Piper Office)	Svensk kontorshygien AB	Papír a print	Leskisen paperi	Wilkins Chawla	Kropliczanka	Tard Postal Services	Deluxe Processed Meats
Business	Packaging	Paper	Paper and Office Supplies	Insurance	Paper	Paper	Paper	Soap	Office supplies	Office hygiene	Paper	Paper	Paper	Mineral water	Postal service	Polony
Location	Rydalmere	Slough	Scranton	Unspecified, but filmed in Cologne	Villepinte	Côte-de-Liesse	Santiago Centro	Aguascalientes	Yehud	Upplands-Väsby	Brno	Riihimäki	Faridabad	Siedlce	Riyadh	Klerksdorp
Regional Manager (or equivalent "boss" role)	Hannah Howard (Felicity Ward)	David Brent (Ricky Gervais)	Michael Scott (Steve Carell) Andy Bernard (Ed Helms)	Bernd Stromberg (Christoph Maria Herbst)	Gilles Triquet (François Berléand)	David Gervais (Antoine Vézina)	Manuel Cerda (Luis Gnecco)	Jerónimo Ponce III (Fernando Bonilla)	Avi Meshulam (Dvir Benedek)	Ove Sundberg (Henrik Dorsin)	Marek Chvála (Václav Kopta)	Pentti Markkanen (Sami Hedberg)	Jagdeep Chadda (Mukul Chadda)	Michał Holc (Piotr Polak)	Malik Al Tuwaifi (Saleh Abuamrh)	Flip Bosman (Albert Pretorius)
Senior Sales; Representative	Nick Fletcher (Steen Raskopoulos)	Tim Canterbury (Martin Freeman)	Jim Halpert (John Krasinski)	Ulf Steinke (Oliver Wnuk)	Paul Delorme (Jérémie Elkaïm)	Louis Tremblay (Sébastien Huberdeau)	Diego Ramírez (Pablo Cazals)	Memo Guerrero (Fabrizio Santini)	Yossi (Eldad Fribas)	Erik Lundkvist (Kim Sulocki)	Tomáš Trojan (Michal Dalecký)	Timo (Pyry Äikää)	Amit Sharma (Sayandeep Sengupta)	Franek Wójcik (Mikołaj Matczak) Adam Szeliga (Rafał Kowalski)	Talal Al Buwaibani (Fahad Al Butairi)	Joubert Cronje (Gert du Plessis)
Assistant (to the) Regional Manager	Lizze Moyle (Note: Lizze is employed as the Receptionist, but has character traits similar to other "Assistant Regional Managers") (Edith Poor)	Gareth Keenan (Mackenzie Crook)	Dwight Schrute (Rainn Wilson)	Berthold "Ernie" Heisterkamp (Bjarne Mädel)	Joel Liotard (Benoît Carré)	Sam Bisaillon (Paul Ahmarani)	Cristián Müller (Mauricio Dell)	Aniv Rubo Flores (Edgar Villa)	Yariv Shauli (Maayan Blum)	Viking Ytterman (Björn Gustafsson)	Jáchym Kořen (Radim Novák)	Jaakko (Antti Heikkinen)	T.P. Mishra (Gopal Datt)	Darek Wasiak (Adam Woronowicz)	Nidal Al Sheraiwi (Nawaf Al Shubaili)	Tjaart Ferreira (Schalk Bezuidenhout)
Receptionists	Greta King (Note: Greta is employed in Sales, but is in the story role of being the Senior Sale Rep's love interest.) (Shari Sebbens)	Dawn Tinsley (Lucy Davis)	Pam Beesly (Jenna Fischer) Erin Hannon (Ellie Kemper)	Tanja Seifert (Diana Staehly)	Laetitia Kadiri (Anne-Laure Balbir)	Anne Viens (Sophie Cadieux)	Rocío Poblete (Nathalia Aragonese)	Sofi Campos (Note: Sofi is employed in customer service, but is in the story role of being the Senior Sale Rep's love interest.) (Elena del Rio) Betty (Paola Flores)	Dana (Mali Levi)	Therese Johansson (Sissela Benn)	Anna Kručinská (Sara Venclovská)	Anna (Linda Wiklund)	Pammi (Samridhi Dewan)	Asia Kasprzyk (Kornelia Strzelecka)	Basma Al Khattar (Reem Mansour)	Emma Engelbrecht (Note: Emma is employed in social media, but is in the story role of being the Senior Sale Rep's love interest.) (Daniah de Villiers)
Temp/Intern	Sebastian Roy (Raj Labade)	Ricky Howard (Oliver Chris)	Ryan Howard (B. J. Novak)	Jonas Fischer (Max Mauff)	Felix Pradier (Xavier Robic)	–	Felipe Tomic (César Sepúlveda)	–	Regev Steiner (Amir Wolf)	–	Ota Kačer (Jiří Hájek)	"OP" (K. Puura)	Sapan Gill (Abhinav Sharma)	–	Rayan Al Sosan (Saad Aziz)	–
Corporate; Supervisors	Alisha Khanna (Pallavi Sharda)	Jennifer Taylor‑Clarke (Stirling Gallacher) Neil Godwin (Patrick Baladi)	Jan Levinson (Melora Hardin) Gabe Lewis (Zach Woods)	Tatjana Berkel (Tatjana Alexander)	Juliette Lebrac (Astrid Bas)	Emmanuelle Sirois-Keaton (Nathalie Coupal)	Jimena Ibarra (Liliana García)	Juana Alpízar (Erika de la Rosa)	Yelena (Helena Yaralova)	Idun Falkenberg (Lisa Linnertorp)	Lenka Falešníková-Vondráčková (Pavla Vitázková)	Katariina (Vera Kiiskinen)	Riya Pahwa (Gauahar Khan)	Patrycja Kowalska (Vanessa Aleksander) Patryk Kowalski (Maciej Musiałowski)	Elham	Ayanda (Ndoni Khanyile)
Accountants	Deborah Leonard (Lucy Schmidt)	Sheila (Jane Lucas)	Angela Martin (Angela Kinsey)	–	Daniel Gabarda (Frédéric Merlo)	–	Yanni (Jimena Nuñez) Teresita Santa María (Luz María Yacometti)	Ángeles Leyva (Note: Angeles is not an accountant, she is a quality manager, but her role is similar to Angela Martin from the American series.) (Arelí González) Don Abel (Guillermo Quintana)	Karol (Roberto Pollak) Ababa "Avi" Sharon (Yossi Vassa)	Lennart Forsström (Rikard Ulvshammar) Anna Norén (Anna Åström) Margareta Wivallius (Ingbritt Hjälm)	Petra (Barbora Sousa)	Maarit (Lotta Lindroos)	Anjali (Priyanka Setia)	Sebastian Sołtys (Jan Sobolewski)	Majida Al Huthail (Maryam Abdulrahman) Ziad (Yasin Ghazzawi)	Kayle Smith (Carl Beukes) Gavin Naicker (Mehboob Bawa)
Accountants	Viktor (Tomáš Sýkora)	Oliver (Howard Saddler)	Oscar Martinez (Oscar Nunez)	–	Daniel Gabarda (Frédéric Merlo)	–	Yanni (Jimena Nuñez) Teresita Santa María (Luz María Yacometti)	Ángeles Leyva (Arelí González) Don Abel (Guillermo Quintana)	Karol (Roberto Pollak) Ababa "Avi" Sharon (Yossi Vassa)	Lennart Forsström (Rikard Ulvshammar) Anna Norén (Anna Åström) Margareta Wivallius (Ingbritt Hjälm)	Farzin (Mazdak Nassir)	Rinchin (Chien Ho Liao)		Sebastian Sołtys (Jan Sobolewski)	Majida Al Huthail (Maryam Abdulrahman) Ziad (Yasin Ghazzawi)	Kayle Smith (Carl Beukes) Gavin Naicker (Mehboob Bawa)
Accountants	César (Alfredo Portuondo)	Keith Bishop (Ewen MacIntosh)	Kevin Malone (Brian Baumgartner)	–	Daniel Gabarda (Frédéric Merlo)	–	Yanni (Jimena Nuñez) Teresita Santa María (Luz María Yacometti)	Ángeles Leyva (Arelí González) Don Abel (Guillermo Quintana)	Karol (Roberto Pollak) Ababa "Avi" Sharon (Yossi Vassa)	Lennart Forsström (Rikard Ulvshammar) Anna Norén (Anna Åström) Margareta Wivallius (Ingbritt Hjälm)	Teppo (Jan Nyquist)	Kutti (Gavin Methalaka)		Sebastian Sołtys (Jan Sobolewski)	Majida Al Huthail (Maryam Abdulrahman) Ziad (Yasin Ghazzawi)	Kayle Smith (Carl Beukes) Gavin Naicker (Mehboob Bawa)
Travelling Sales; Representative	–	Chris Finch (Ralph Ineson)	Todd Packer (David Koechner)	Theo Hölter (Andreas Schmidt)	Didier Leguelec (Jean-Pierre Loustau)	Rocky Larocque (Yves Amyot)	Carlitos García (Sergio Piña)	–	Shimi Guetta (Shai Avivi)	"Boozen" (Kristoffer Appelquist)	Jiří Nebeský (Rastislav Gajdoš)	–	Prem Chopra (Ranvir Shorey)	Tadek Boniacha (Wojciech Żołądkowicz)	–	–
Receptionist's fiancé (Note: In The Office Saudi Arabia, the receptionists' fiancé is replaced with the receptionists' brother to comply with Sharia law.)	Mason (Claude Jabbour)	Lee (Joel Beckett)	Roy Anderson (David Denman)	Roland (off camera)	Ludovic Correia (Julien Favart)	Luc (Martin Tremblay)	Marco (Marcelo Maldonado)	Pascal (Alejandro de Hoyos)	Lavi (Alon Hamawi)	Kenneth Gustavsson (Peter Jansson)	Libor (Dušan Vitázek)	Ripa (Leo Honkonen)	Parmeet (Kunal Pant)	Paweł Szod (Jakub Zając)	Khattab Al Khattar (Alwesam Shigdar)	–
Senior Sales Representative's girlfriend	–	Rachel (Stacey Roca)	Katy Moore (Amy Adams) Karen Filippelli (Rashida Jones)	Tanja Seifert (Diana Staehly)	–	Julie (Évelyne Rompré)	Catalina (María José Urúza)	Sabrina (off camera)	Shiri (Noa Wollman)	–	–	–	Loveleen (Anandita Pagnis)	Marta Bielecka (Katarzyna Gałązka)	–	Stella (Mila de Villiers)
Other office co-workers	Martin Katavake (Josh Thomson) Lloyd Kneathn (Jonny Brugh) Tina Kwong (Susan Ling Young)	Jamie (Jamie Deeks) Ben (Ben Bradshaw) Emma (Emma Manton) Donna (Sally Bretton) Joan (Yvonne D’Alpra) Malcolm (Robin Hooper) Brenda (Julie Fernandez) Trudy (Rachel Isaac)	Stanley Hudson (Leslie David Baker) Phyllis Lapin-Vance (Phyllis Smith) Kelly Kapoor (Mindy Kaling) Toby Flenderson (Paul Lieberstein) Meredith Palmer (Kate Flannery) Creed Bratton (Creed Bratton) Nellie Bertram (Catherine Tate) Clark Green (Clark Duke) Pete Miller (Jake Lacy)	Erika Burstedt (Martina Eitner-Acheampong) Jennifer Schirrmann (Milena Dreißig) Lars Lehnhoff (Laurens Walter) Nicole Rückert (Angelika Richter) Hans Schmelzer (Ralf Husmann) Sabine Buhrer (Maja Beckmann)	–	–	Trini (Karla Matta) Jesús (Marcelo Valdivieso) Benito Rojas (Vittorio Yaconi) Dante Espinoza (Cristián Quezada) Don Hugo Vera (Juan Quezada)	Qwerty (Armando Espit) Mondra (Quetzalli Cortés) Abigail Delgado (Alejandra Ley) Lucio Galván (Juan Carlos Medellín) Minerva (Alexa Zuart) Giancarlo (Rodrigo Suárez)	Yevgeni (Dima Ross) Leah (Ayelet Robinson) Riki (Hilla Sarjon) Abed (Jamil Khoury)	Britt-Marie Lind (Veronica Dahlström) Massoud Ghorbani (Hassan Brijany) Robin T. Larsson (David Druid) Örjan Almqvist (Christoffer Olofsson)	–	Aune (Paula Siimes) Leyla (Ushma Olava)	Saleem (Sunil Jetly) Sarla Bansal (Preeti Kochar); Madhukar (Mayur Bansiwal) Kitty Kataria (Mallika Dua)	Bożena Grabowska (Milena Lisiecka) Gosia Uszyńska (Monika Obara) Agnieszka Majewska (Monika Kulczyk) Levan Kobiaszwili (Marcin Pempuś) Łukasz "Łuki" Gnatowski (Adam Bobik) Marzena Krupska (Daria Widawska) Kasia Płaczkiewicz (Małgorzata Gorol) Tomek "Reagan" Grabowski (Mateusz Król)	Fadi (Aous Chazal) Suleiman (Mohamed Helal) Wedad (Hanaa Al Somali) Khalaf (Thamer Al Harbi) Abeer (Hind Al Saigh) Salem Al Sahhal (Hashem Hawsawi)	Nqobani 'Q' Mkhize (Sipumziwe Lucwaba) Miems van Eck (Lida Botha) Joanne Davids (Ilse Oppelt)
Warehouse; Foreman	Stevie Jones (Zoe Terakes)	Glynn "Taffy" (David Schaal)	Darryl Philbin (Craig Robinson)	–	–	–	Sami (Yaniv Suissa)	Bufis (Israel Islas)	Kenneth Gustavsson (Peter Jansson)	Roman (Martin Tlapák)	–	Rajinder (Manpreet Singh)	–	–	Anwar Jibawi	–

== Selected major awards ==
- British version: 2005 Golden Globes for Best Television Series – Musical or Comedy and Best Performance by an Actor in a Television Series – Musical or Comedy (Ricky Gervais); 2001, 2002 and 2003 British Academy Television Awards for Situation Comedy and Best Comedy Performance (Ricky Gervais)
- American version: 2006 Golden Globe for Best Performance by an Actor in a Television Series – Musical or Comedy (Steve Carell); 2006 Emmy Award for Outstanding Comedy Series; 2007 Screen Actors Guild Award for Outstanding Performance by an Ensemble in a Comedy Series; 2007 Emmy Award for Outstanding Writing for a Comedy Series (Greg Daniels); 2009 Primetime Emmy Award for Outstanding Directing for a Comedy Series (Jeffrey Blitz). For other awards and honors see List of awards and nominations received by The Office (American TV series)
- German version: 2006 Grimme Award for Fiction/Entertainment – Series/Miniseries; 2007 Deutscher Fernsehpreis for Best Sitcom and Best Book; 2006, 2007, 2010 and 2012 Deutscher Comedypreis for Best Actor in a Comedy Series (Christoph Maria Herbst).
