= List of The Office (British TV series) episodes =

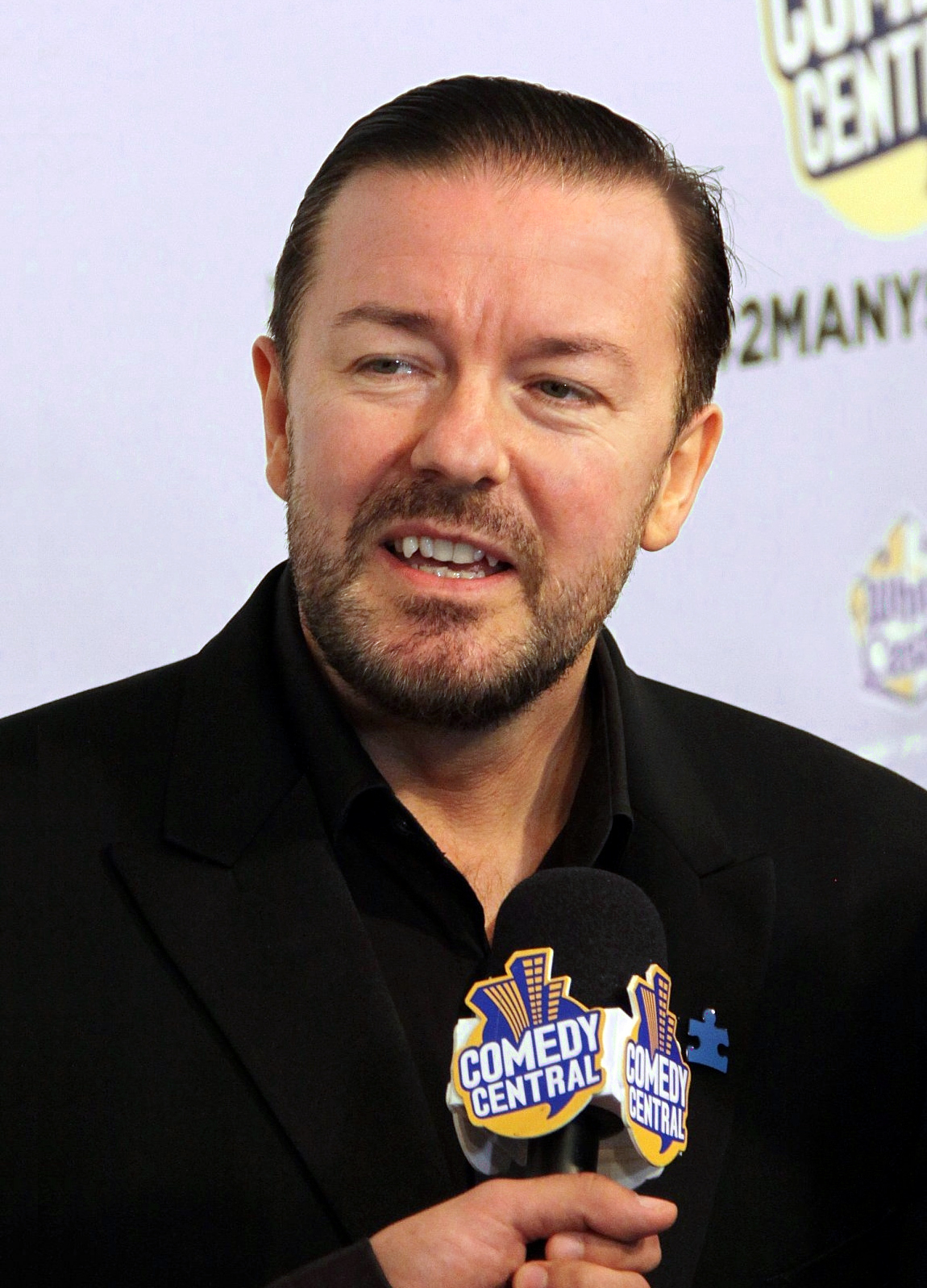
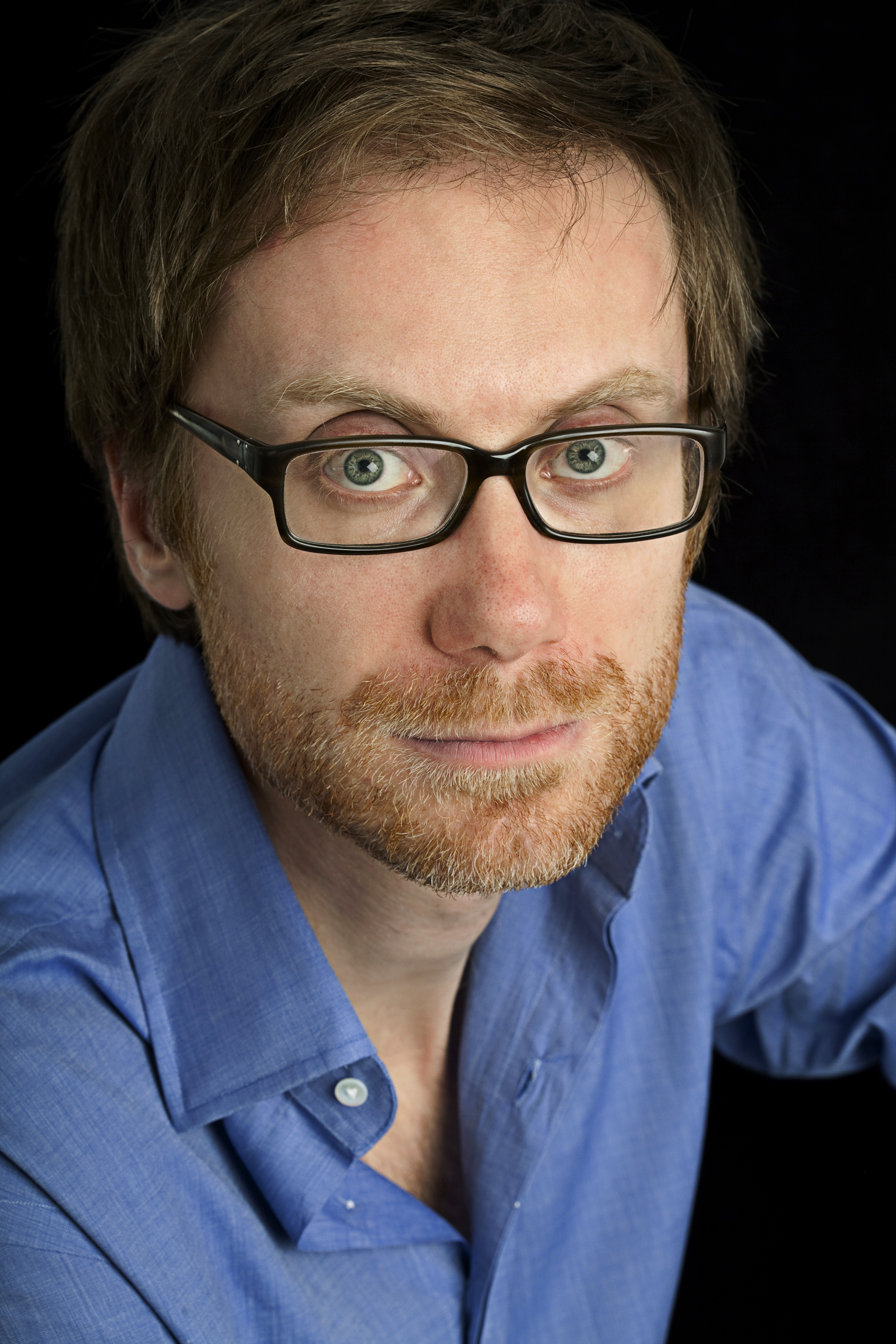
The Office was co-written and co-created by Ricky Gervais and Stephen Merchant. Gervais (left) also starred as main character David Brent.

The Office is a British sitcom that was originally broadcast by the BBC in the United Kingdom from 2001 to 2003 as the original series of The Office. The television programme was created and written by Ricky Gervais and Stephen Merchant; the former also played the main character, manager David Brent. The series is set in the Slough office of a fictional paper merchant, Wernham Hogg, and is presented in a mockumentary format depicting the everyday lives of its employees.

Brent tries to be a friend and an entertainer as well as a boss, and is often annoying as a result. His sycophantic assistant Gareth Keenan (Mackenzie Crook) annoys and is often pranked by sales representative Tim Canterbury (Martin Freeman), whose relationship with receptionist Dawn Tinsley (Lucy Davis) is a major story arc, despite her engagement to warehouse worker Lee (Joel Beckett). Minor characters include droning and crass office worker Keith Bishop (Ewen MacIntosh), Brent's brash and sexist friend Chris Finch (Ralph Ineson) and Brent's bosses Jennifer Taylor-Clarke (Stirling Gallacher) and later Neil Godwin (Patrick Baladi).

The programme ran for two series of six half-hour episodes each: the first aired from July to August 2001, and the second from September to November 2002. A two-part Christmas special aired on 26 and 27 December 2003. There are 14 episodes in total. Series 1 and 2 were originally broadcast on BBC Two, but the Christmas episodes were moved to BBC One to increase viewership following the previous series' popularity. Both series, as well as the Christmas specials, have been released on DVD in Regions 1, 2 and 4. The programme has won numerous awards, including two British Comedy Awards and two Golden Globe. The Office has also been remade in several countries, of which the American adaptation has been the most popular and longest-running.

Episodes were shot on tape, then filmised in post-production to achieve the documentary-type atmosphere. The deleted scenes on the DVDs are presented raw, pre-filmization.

== Series overview ==
Series	Episodes	Originally released		
Series	Episodes	First released	Last released	Network
1	6	9 July 2001	20 August 2001	BBC Two
2	6	30 September 2002	4 November 2002	BBC Two
Christmas	2	26 December 2003		BBC One
Revisited		15 March 2013		BBC One

== Episodes ==
=== Series 1 (2001) ===
No. overall	No. in series	Title	Written and directed by	Original release date
1	1	"Downsize"	Ricky Gervais & Stephen Merchant	9 July 2001
Wernham Hogg, a paper distribution company based in the towns of Slough and Swindon, intends to downsize one of its branches in order to raise efficiency. David Brent, manager of the Slough branch, informs his staff — but recklessly promises them that nobody is going to lose their jobs. The first episode of the series introduces several key characters: David Brent, the delusional manager; Gareth Keenan, David's insufferable "Assistant to the Regional Manager", who takes his unofficial "Team Leader" status far too seriously; salesman Tim Canterbury; and engaged receptionist Dawn Tinsley, with whom Tim shares an unspoken mutual attraction. Tim, who finds his job boring and unfulfilling, amuses himself by playing elaborate pranks on Gareth, such as placing his stapler in jelly.
2	2	"Work Experience"	Ricky Gervais & Stephen Merchant	16 July 2001
New employee Donna is introduced to the Slough branch, who is also temporarily staying with David as a favour to her parents. A pornographic image with David's face is circulated across the office, much to his embarrassment, which he hides as anger because it "offends women". Gareth is tasked with finding the person responsible and immediately lays blame on Tim, without proof. Jennifer, Regional Manager for Wernham Hogg and David's boss, also comes by to see David's instigated changes in the face of downsizing, but is annoyed when David's efforts amount to very little being changed. In an effort to prove her wrong, David confronts Tim over the image, but when Tim reveals it was actually Chris Finch, David's best friend, his charged attitude changes entirely. Under Jennifer's instruction, David supposedly calls Chris to fire him. Jennifer presses the speakerphone button and reveals that David had actually called the speaking clock.
3	3	"The Quiz"	Ricky Gervais & Stephen Merchant	23 July 2001
Tim's 30th birthday conflicts with a pub quiz night, which David and Chris have won consecutively for the past six years. David hires Ricky, a temporary employee, despite the recent news of downsizing. Ricky appears to be quite intelligent, resulting in an increasingly frustrated David attempting, but failing, to prove he is more intelligent. Chris Finch arrives at the branch ahead of the quiz night. Chris is shown to have an incredibly crude and offensive sense of humour, often making sexist and homophobic remarks without regard. Chris also shows contempt for students as jobless "wastes of space", insulting Ricky, who worked whilst studying. Ricky proves his mettle at the quiz by successfully answering first to a tie-breaker question. Though Chris answered incorrectly at first, Gareth did not state that both teams only had one chance to answer correctly, prompting a confrontation that is resolved in a shoe throwing challenge, which Chris smugly wins.
4	4	"Training"	Ricky Gervais & Stephen Merchant	30 July 2001
A staff training day is organised for Wernham Hogg's employees by outside facilitator Rowan. David, however, constantly interrupts the session, eventually resulting in Tim leaving out of boredom for his job at Wernham Hogg. A subplot also plays out between Dawn and her fiancé Lee, who works in the warehouse below the branch. The couple are privately experiencing relationship problems, resulting in Dawn returning to the session in tears. Tim, assuming Dawn has left Lee, invites her out for a drink with him. She informs him that they are still together, with Tim attempting to play off his invitation as a purely friendly gesture.
5	5	"New Girl"	Ricky Gervais & Stephen Merchant	13 August 2001
Despite redundancies being put into effect, David decides to hire Karen as another secretary, influenced solely by his attraction to her. Donna arrives late for work, having spent the night at someone else's place. In an effort to raise staff morale, David organises an outing at the local nightclub. Gareth gains the attention of a woman who he proceeds to make out with, but incredulously rejects her offer to go home with her when he realises she is married. Chris successfully attracts a woman, while David's own attempts to "pull" with Karen and another woman fall flat. Donna takes the opportunity at the club to announce that she spent the night with Ricky, who happily rubs it in Chris' face, as he also had eyes on her.
6	6	"Judgement"	Ricky Gervais & Stephen Merchant	20 August 2001
Jennifer returns to the Slough branch to announce her partnership to Wernham Hogg, meaning that her job is available if David wants it, and adds that he has the majority support of the board. David accepts the position, despite knowing that it will mean that the Slough branch will close and its resources amalgamated with Swindon, which will also mean some of his staff will be made redundant, contravening his earlier promise that it will not happen. David breaks the news, including his promotion, to the staff, which is universally received as unnecessary information and just serves as another reason to dislike him even more. At his going away party, and to everybody's surprise, David announces that he turned down the offer and has ensured everybody at Slough is safe. David then talks privately to Tim, who is still certain about quitting. David offers Tim a promotion if he stays, though this draws Dawn's disapproval of Tim at giving up on his dreams, reflecting her own regret at being influenced by her fiancé to give up her ambition of becoming a children's book illustrator. An employee later confronts David about a rumour circulating that he failed a medical examination, but David avoids a direct response and insinuates that he had deliberately thrown the test.

=== Series 2 (2002) ===
No. overall	No. in series	Title	Written and directed by	Original release date	Viewers (millions)
7	1	"Merger"	Ricky Gervais & Stephen Merchant	30 September 2002	4.93
Neil Godwin and several Swindon employees arrive at the Slough branch, with Neil taking over as Jennifer's replacement. David's staff take an instant liking to Neil, and David in turn begins to dislike his new boss. Tim, now a Senior Sales Clerk, begins to take his job much more seriously, though Gareth disputes Tim's legitimate authority over him as the non-official "Assistant to the Regional Manager". Furthermore, Tim's authority begins to alienate Dawn, upsetting her when he returns her to her desk. David repeats a dick joke with a racial subtext told to him by Gareth earlier, but it is received in poor taste by the Swindon staff, who complain to Jennifer. David then earns the wrath of Jennifer twice in the same day when he jokes about smoking marijuana, suggesting that he promoted drug use in the office.
8	2	"Appraisals"	Ricky Gervais & Stephen Merchant	7 October 2002	3.94
David runs a performance appraisal for his staff, in which Keith in particular is shown to have absolutely no motivation for his job. The Swindon staff also indicate that they prefer Neil's method of management over David's, prompting a lunch outing orchestrated by David in which he insultingly remarks he is the only one who makes the effort, despite being joined by the Swindon staff of their own volition. Returning to the branch, David berates Neil for having fun with the staff who remained when he and they should be working. Confused but also angry, Neil confronts David in his office, demanding he speaks to him respectfully in the future. After the dressing down, David claims to Tim, Jamie and Gareth that Neil was berating them and the rest of the Slough staff and that if a fight broke out between him and Neil, the latter would be "through the wall". Tim questions this logic, judging that Neil is clearly in better shape than David.
9	3	"Party"	Ricky Gervais & Stephen Merchant	14 October 2002	3.56
Swindon branch employee Trudy is celebrating her birthday, but David's total lack of social skills dampens the spirit of the event. Rachel, another Swindon employee, becomes the target of competitive rivalry between Gareth and Tim, though Rachel is shown to clearly be more interested in Tim. Rachel dares Tim to put Trudy's dildo in David's office, Dawn watches from her desk with clear jealousy in feeling left out. David is approached by Cooper & Webb, a consultancy firm interested in hiring him as a motivational speaker at a very attractive price. David happily accepts the offer and gloats about it to anyone who is interested, but is later irritated when he learns that Neil was also approached with the same offer. Neil warns David that his outside commitments are a cause for concern for his performance with Wernham Hogg.
10	4	"Motivation"	Ricky Gervais & Stephen Merchant	21 October 2002	3.60
Simon, the office computer technician, arrives to install a new firewall on the staff computers. Friends with Gareth, the two talk about Simon's exaggerated and fantastical tales of go-karting, which Tim overhears and mocks. Noticing his involvement with Rachel, Simon retorts with knowledge about his prior interest in Dawn, which leaves Tim speechless. Wheelchair user Brenda approaches Neil and informs him she has not been paid. Furious, Neil confronts David about his lack of concern for his commitments at Wernham Hogg, relating to his earlier suspicions that the motivation seminars are distracting him. With assistance from Dawn, David presents his unorthodox and unusual seminar, which sticks out like a sore thumb in contrast to the other, more professional-looking seminars, and only disappoints the paying audience.
11	5	"Charity"	Ricky Gervais & Stephen Merchant	28 October 2002	4.29
As part of the effort for Red Nose Day, Wernham Hogg's employees come up with various means of raising money. Tim pledges to raise money by hiding as many of Gareth's possessions throughout the day. Dawn sells kisses at her desk, but Neil steals the show disco dancing with Rachel, before performing an impressive solo rendition of John Travolta's dance from Saturday Night Fever. David also performs his own dance, but only out of his need to outdo Neil. Neil and Jennifer later confront David for failing to hand in a report that day, having been distracted again by extracurricular work. Neil's growing frustration with David culminates in him giving David his first official warning. David, however, responds by foolishly daring Neil to try run the office without him, believing his loyal staff would be in uproar if David was suspended. Neil and Jennifer later return to David, informing him that he will be made redundant. Tim submits his pledge to Dawn's charity scheme, expecting a kiss on the cheek for his donation. Dawn, however, passionately kisses Tim on the lips, confirming her growing attraction to him.
12	6	"Interview"	Ricky Gervais & Stephen Merchant	4 November 2002	4.67
The news of David's redundancy does not have the effect he had expected; in fact most of the staff seem relieved that he is finally being let go. Dawn also hands in her notice, planning on moving to Florida with Lee. Learning of this surprise move, Tim breaks up with Rachel and confesses his true feelings to Dawn in private. Though they share a hug, Dawn refuses to break up with Lee. Furthermore, David is informed by Cooper & Webb that he will no longer be needed as a motivational speaker during an interview with an industry magazine reporter. Now despondent about his bleak future, David begs Neil and Jennifer to reverse his dismissal, though the decision has already been approved.

=== Christmas specials (2003) ===
After the conclusion of the second series, creators Ricky Gervais and Stephen Merchant stated that no more series would be filmed. However, they did write and film two additional episodes, 45 and 50 minutes in duration, which first aired in the United Kingdom on BBC One on 26 December (Boxing Day) and 27 December 2003.

No.	Title	Written and directed by	Original release date	Viewers (millions)
13	Christmas Special: Part 1	Ricky Gervais & Stephen Merchant	26 December 2003	7.17
Sometime after the previous series, the BBC returns to several individuals who were made famous by the documentary. David is revealed to have squandered his generous redundancy package on a music career. During a disastrous appearance at a Blind Date-style event, where he dresses in a tacky Austin Powers outfit, he finds that other personalities like Howard Brown prove to be more popular and liked than him. At Wernham Hogg, Gareth is made General Manager and has also introduced sweeping changes that finally replace David's methods, which Gareth admits were unprofessional. Tim still works there but has an annoying pregnant desk mate as his only company. David constantly visits the office uninvited in what he believes is a "morale boost" for his former staff. Neil eventually bans David from returning during work hours. In Florida, Dawn and Lee are shown to have settled down, but Lee continues to show no respect for her ambitions or happiness. With the annual Christmas party coming soon, the camera crew offers to fly them back to attend.
14	Christmas Special: Part 2	Ricky Gervais & Stephen Merchant	27 December 2003	6.14
In an effort to look good in front of Neil and his peers who have since abandoned him, David looks for a woman to take to the party. Three attempts fail miserably, but his fourth date expresses a genuine interest in David and joins him. During the party, David finally stands up to Chris Finch's behaviour towards him and humbles Neil with his attractive date. Dawn leaves early with Lee, as their plane back to America is due to leave soon. As part of the Secret Santa, Tim gifts Dawn an oil painting set accompanied with a card in which he writes "Never give up!" Touched by Tim's sensitivity, Dawn finally leaves Lee and returns to the party and kisses Tim. In gathering for a group photo, David finally makes everyone genuinely laugh with a Frank Spencer impression.

=== The Return of Brent (2013) ===
As part of Red Nose Day 2013 and to celebrate ten years since the end of The Office, a one-off special short episode catches up with David, the former manager of the Slough branch of Wernham Hogg Paper Merchants.

Title	Original release date
The Return of Brent The Office Revisited	15 March 2013
David starts a new career as a talent manager in the music industry, trying to help rapper Dom Johnson (Doc Brown) secure his big break. [Note: Brent was the only returning character from The Office.]

== See also ==
- David Brent: Life on the Road
