= Konttori =

Finnish sitcom and mockumentary

- Genre: Comedy
- Written by: Mike Pohjola; Kari Hietalahti; Anna Ruohonen
- Directed by: Janne Reinikainen; Markus Lehmusruusu; Paula Korva
- Country of origin: Finland
- Original language: Finnish
- No. of seasons: 3
- No. of episodes: 26

Production
- Producers: Jesse Fryckman; Samuli Norhomaa
- Production locations: Set on Riihimäki, filmed on Espoo

Konttori (lit. 'Office') is a Finnish mockumentary television series and the first and only official adaptation of the British sitcom "The Office" in the Finnish language. The series was first aired on 3 March 2017 in the Elisa Viihde and Nelonen networks. The series had a total runtime of 26 episodes between three seasons, with the third and currently last season airing in 2019.

== Synopsis ==
The series follows the daily work life of the employees in the Riihimäki office of the Leskinen Paperi Oy paper company. Similar to its counterparts, the series is presented as a documentary filmed by an on-site crew, with a socially awkward boss similar to David Brent or Michael Scott, named Pentti Markkanen that is played by Sami Hedberg.

== Production ==
Konttori was produced by the Finnish company Solar Republic after the format of "The Office" was licensed by the BBC to the Finnish broadcasters Elisa Viihde and Nelonen, with 2 seasons and 16 episodes commissioned. Production began in 2016 with filming taking place on an office in a neighborhood of Espoo, Finland. With the show set in Riihimäki and filming in Espoo, Konttori is the northernmost The Office adaptation, and the one set in the smallest city. According to Mike Pohjola (one of the series' writers) in an interview, Riihimäki was chosen as the setting because of its status as an "in-between" municipality in size, neither too small or too large. He also described the series' setting as an "extremely dreary office milieu" with a depressing and dirty atmosphere. The series was written mainly by Pohjola, who took inspiration from the Sipilä cabinet for some of the episodes. It was also directed by multiple directors along the seasons, notably Janne Reinikainen in the first season and Markus Lehmusruusu in the second and third.

== Reception ==
The series was criticised both before and after release due to the choice of starring stand-up comedian Sami Hedberg as the lead actor of the series, because of his lack of experience in television, with him only having one major role in film before. The first two episodes of Konttori were shown to multiple journalists, who gave them mixed reviews, with some praising the actors and others critiquing that the series seemed like nothing more than a less funny translation of its British and American counterparts. Although opinions on the series were divided, Konttori became sufficiently popular for an additional season to enter production by 2018, which received positive reviews upon release.

== Cast ==
- Sami Hedberg as Pentti Markkanen
- Pyry Äikää as Timo Kivelä
- Linda Wiklund as Anna Fredriksson
- Antti Heikkinen as Jaakko Roisko
- Ushma Olava as Leyla Hassan
- Lotta Lindroos as Maarit Petäjävirta
- Kaisla Puura as OP Hartikainen
- Mazdak Nassir as Farzin
- Jan Nyquist as Teppo Malinen
- Paula Siimes as Aune
- Leo Honkonen as Ripa Niemi
- Jean-Eric Chaumentin as Erkki Runqvist Lindqvist
- Vera Kiiskinen as Katariina Leskinen
- Peter Kanerva as Pärre Ericsson
