= Dvir Benedek =

Israeli actor (born 1969)

- דביר בנדק
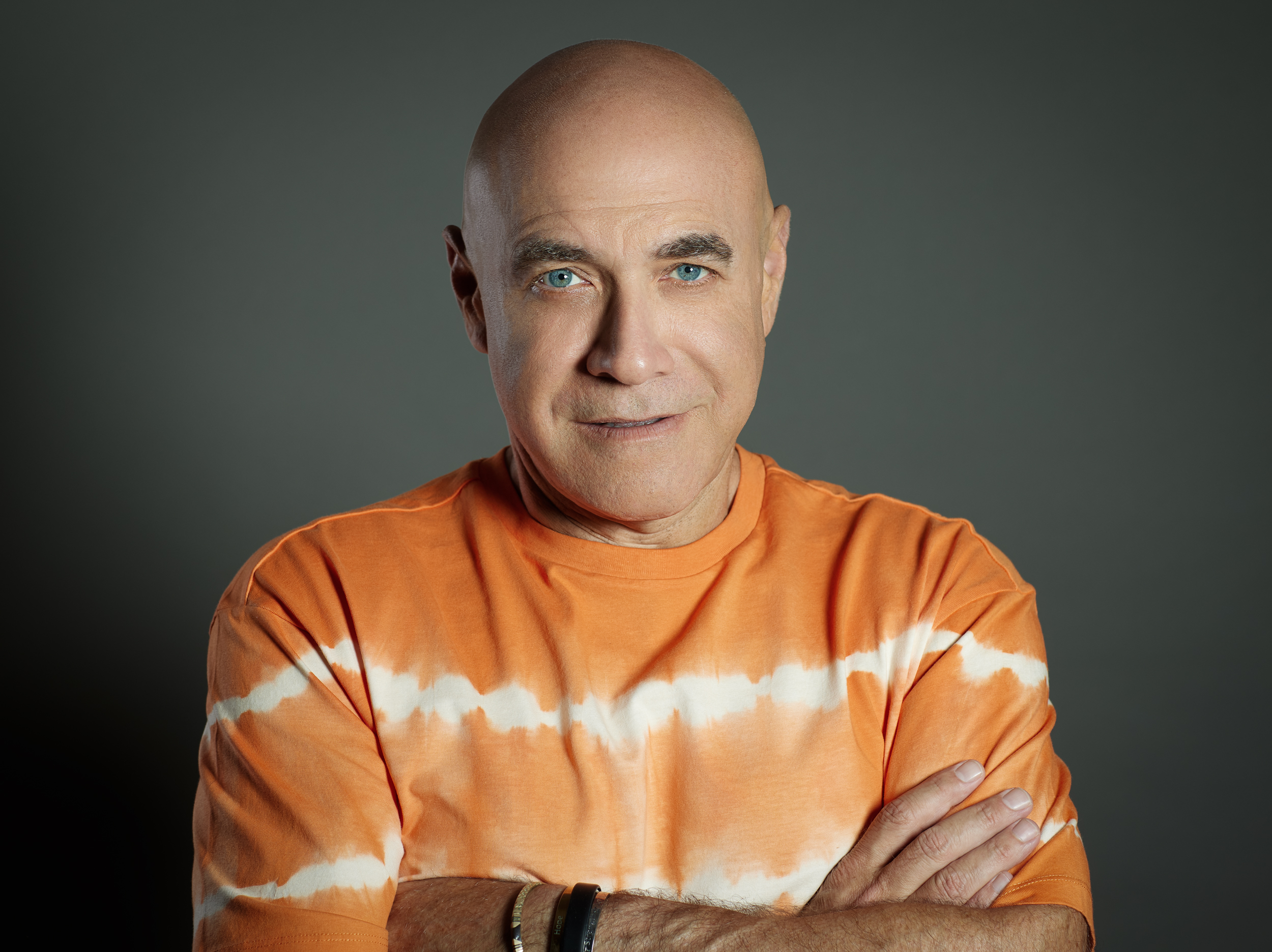
- Benedek in 2023
- Born: 29 December 1969 (age 56); Kiryat Yam, Israel
- Occupation: Actor
- Years active: 1995–present
- Spouse: Irit Natan Benedek

Dvir Benedek (Hebrew: דביר בנדק; born 29 December 1969) is an Israeli actor and the former chairman of the Israeli screen actors union – Shaham.

== Biography ==
Dvir Benedek lives in Givatayim with his wife Irit Natan Benedek and their daughter, Yuli, born in 2010.

== Acting and media career ==
=== Theatre ===
Benedek appeared in Israeli plays such as Gever Isha Milim, Miskhakey Hevra, Revizor, 4 on 4, In Habima Theatre: Hadibuk, Kadish Le Neomy, The Good Soldier Švejk, Tango, Perurim, and Driving Miss Daisy (play). In 2008, Benedek won the Best supporting actor award on behalf of Habima Theatre. Benedek was also the first non-English speaking actor portraying Shrek in the Israeli production of Shrek The Musical.

=== Television ===
Benedek starred in the television series Shaul, Haretzua, Sibat Hamavet: Retakh, My first Sony, Zimerim, Hanefilim, Gam Lahem Magia, Quicky. In 2008, Bendek participated in the Israeli television series Makom Ledeaaga, Hakira Pnimit and Papadizzi.

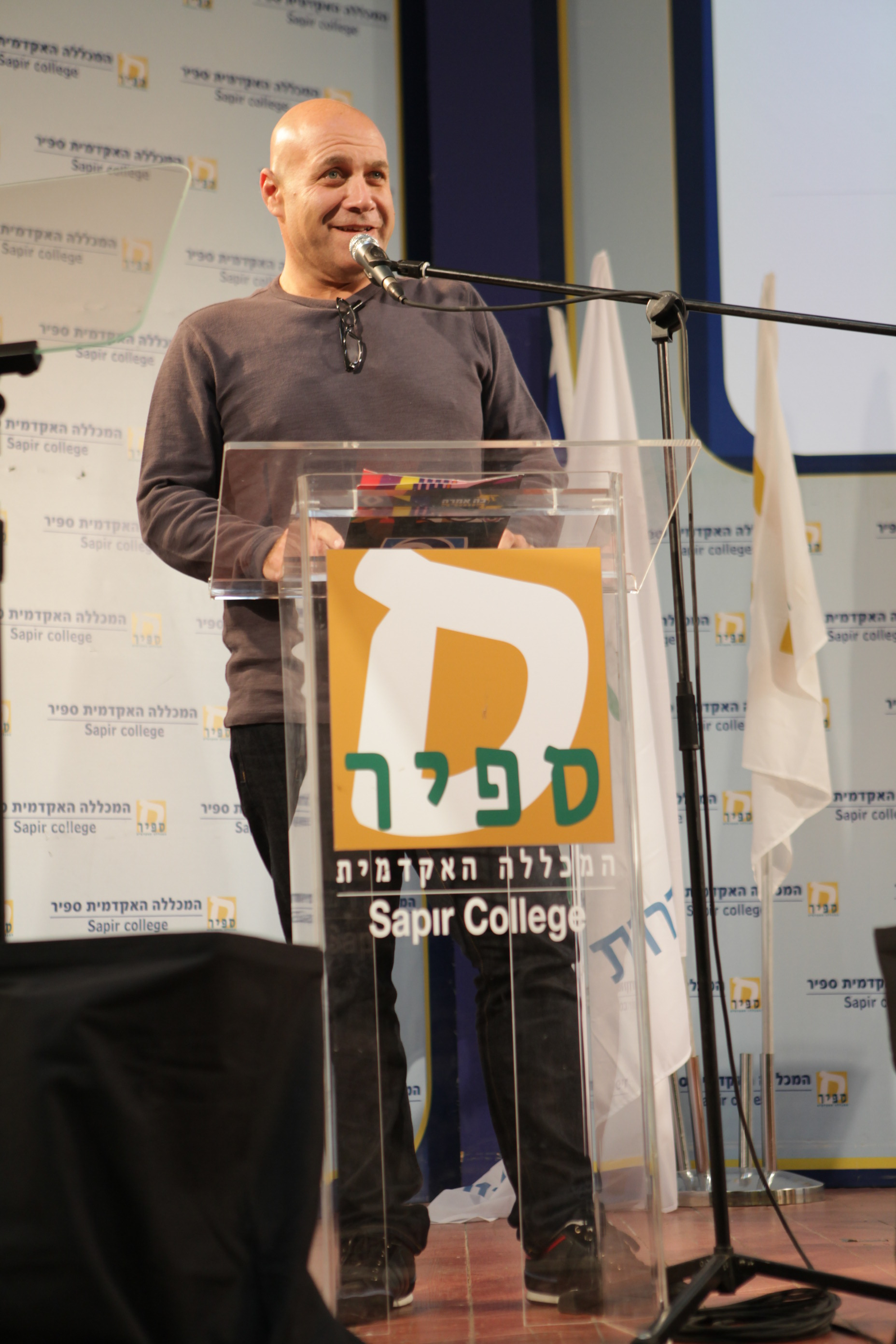
Benedek at Sapir Academic College

In 2010, Benedek participated in the television series Taxi Driver and was announced to feature as the lead character in HaMisrad, an Israeli version of The Office, as Avi Meshulam (an adaptation of the original British series' lead character David Brent). In 2020, Benedek anonymously participated in the Israeli production of The Masked Singer as The Shark.

=== Film ===
Benedek co-starred in the movies Maya, Kirot, Kalat Hayam, A Matter of Size, Seret hatuna (2006), Yomuledet (2005), Eize Makom Nifla, 'Yeladim Tovim', 'Hamesh Dakot BeHalicha', Lemon Popsicle 9: The Party Goes On, Mars Turkey, D.F.1: The Lost Patrol, Mivtza Savta, Zman Avir and The Attack (2012).

=== Voice acting ===
Benedek voiced Mr. Conductor in Thomas and the Magic Railroad, Aslan in The Chronicles of Narnia, Nigel in The Wild, and Po in Kung Fu Panda.

== Awards and recognition ==
Benedek won the Best Actor Award at the Seoul Drama Awards Festival 2008, for his role in the TV film Hahonech (The Tutor)

== See also ==
- Theater of Israel
- Television in Israel
