= British Academy Television Award for Best Comedy Performance =

British Academy Television Award
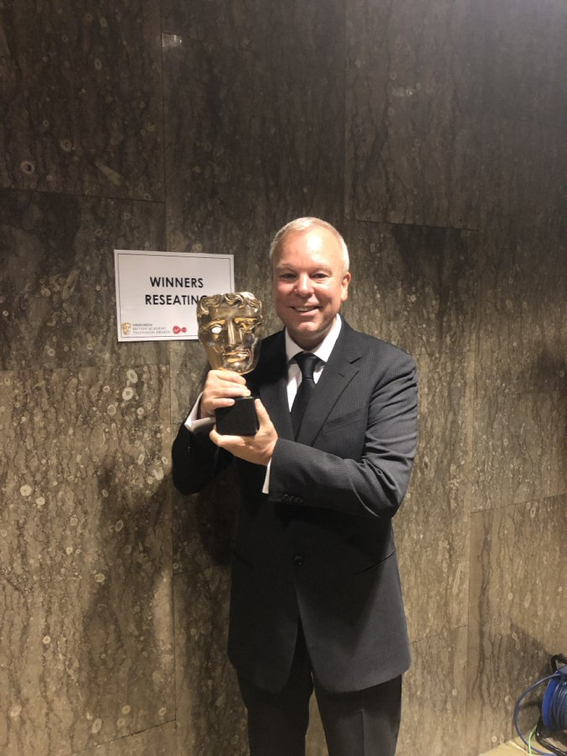
- BAFTA statuette
- Country: United Kingdom
- Presented by: British Academy of Film and Television Arts
- First award: 1994 (presented in 1995)
- Final award: 2008 (presented in 2009)
- Website: www.bafta.org

This page lists the winners and nominees for the British Academy Television Award for Best Comedy Performance, since its institution in 1994.

The British Academy of Film and Television Arts (BAFTA), is a British organisation that hosts annual awards shows for film, television, children's film and television, and interactive media. Since 1994 (presented in 1995), selected comedy performances have been awarded with the BAFTA award for Best Comedy Performance at an annual ceremony.

Before 1994, acting performances in comedy roles were included in the Best Light Entertainment Performance category.

Since 2009 (presented in 2010), two separate awards have been given, Best Male Comedy Performance and Best Female Comedy Performance.

In the following lists, the first titles listed are winners, these are also in bold and in blue background; those not in bold are nominees. The year given is the year of the ceremony, for programmes made the previous year. This rule has altered slightly in recent years, for the 2011 ceremony the eligibility period was from 1 March 2010 through to 28 February 2011, while for the 2012 ceremony the eligibility period was from 1 March 2011 through to 15 February 2012.

== 1990s ==
| | Nominees | Programme |
|---|---|---|
| 1995 | **Joanna Lumley** | **Absolutely Fabulous** |
| 1995 | Steve Coogan | Three Fights, Two Weddings and a Funeral |
| 1995 | Annette Crosbie | One Foot in the Grave |
| 1995 | Richard Wilson | One Foot in the Grave |
| 1996 | **Martin Clunes** | **Men Behaving Badly** |
| 1996 | Judi Dench | As Time Goes By |
| 1996 | Joanna Lumley | Absolutely Fabulous |
| 1996 | Richard Wilson | One Foot in the Grave |
| 1997 | **David Jason** | **Only Fools and Horses Christmas Special** |
| 1997 | Martin Clunes | Men Behaving Badly |
| 1997 | Joanna Lumley | Absolutely Fabulous |
| 1997 | Nicholas Lyndhurst | Only Fools and Horses Christmas Special |
| 1998 | **Steve Coogan** | **I'm Alan Partridge** |
| 1998 | Judi Dench | As Time Goes By |
| 1998 | Dawn French | The Vicar of Dibley |
| 1998 | Richard Wilson | One Foot in the Grave |
| 1999 | **Dermot Morgan** | **Father Ted** |
| 1999 | Caroline Aherne | The Royle Family |
| 1999 | Ardal O'Hanlon | Father Ted |
| 1999 | Julie Walters | dinnerladies |
| 2000 | **Caroline Aherne** | **The Royle Family** |
| 2000 | Dawn French | The Vicar of Dibley |
| 2000 | Sue Johnston | The Royle Family |
| 2000 | Ricky Tomlinson | The Royle Family |

== 2000s ==
| | Nominees | Programme |
|---|---|---|
| 2001 | **Sacha Baron Cohen** | **Da Ali G Show** |
| 2001 | Caroline Aherne | The Royle Family |
| 2001 | Kathy Burke | Gimme Gimme Gimme |
| 2001 | Dawn French | The Vicar of Dibley |
| 2002 | **Ricky Gervais** | **The Office** |
| 2002 | Kathy Burke | Gimme Gimme Gimme |
| 2002 | Robert Lindsay | My Family |
| 2002 | Joanna Lumley | Absolutely Fabulous |
| 2003 | **Ricky Gervais** | **The Office** |
| 2003 | John Bird, John Fortune | Bremner, Bird and Fortune |
| 2003 | Steve Coogan | I'm Alan Partridge |
| 2003 | Peter Kay | Phoenix Nights |
| 2004 | **Ricky Gervais** | **The Office Christmas Specials** |
| 2004 | Martin Freeman | The Office Christmas Specials |
| 2004 | Matt Lucas | Little Britain |
| 2004 | David Walliams | Little Britain |
| 2005 | **Matt Lucas**, **David Walliams** | **Little Britain** |
| 2005 | Rory Bremner | Bremner, Bird and Fortune |
| 2005 | Julia Davis | Nighty Night |
| 2005 | Tamsin Greig | Green Wing |
| 2006 | **Chris Langham** | **The Thick of It** |
| 2006 | Peter Capaldi | The Thick of It |
| 2006 | Ashley Jensen | Extras |
| 2006 | Catherine Tate | The Catherine Tate Show |
| 2007 | **Ricky Gervais** | **Extras** |
| 2007 | Dawn French | The Vicar of Dibley |
| 2007 | Stephen Merchant | Extras |
| 2007 | Liz Smith | The Royle Family: The Queen of Sheba |
| 2008 | **James Corden** | **Gavin & Stacey** |
| 2008 | Peter Capaldi | The Thick of It |
| 2008 | Stephen Merchant | Extras: The Extra Special Series Finale |
| 2008 | David Mitchell | Peep Show |
| 2009 | **David Mitchell** | **Peep Show** |
| 2009 | Rob Brydon | Gavin & Stacey |
| 2009 | Sharon Horgan | Pulling |
| 2009 | Claire Skinner | Outnumbered |

== Superlatives ==
=== Most awards won ===
Number of nominations in parentheses

- 4 : Ricky Gervais (4)
- 2 : Steve Coogan (4)
- 1 : Caroline Aherne (3)
- 1 : Jo Brand (2)
- 1 : Martin Clunes (1)
- 1 : Sacha Baron Cohen (1)
- 1 : James Corden (1)
- 1 : David Jason (1)
- 1 : Chris Langham (1)
- 1 : Matt Lucas (2)
- 1 : Joanna Lumley (4)
- 1 : David Mitchell (4)
- 1 : Dermot Morgan (1)
- 1 : David Walliams (2)

== See also ==
- British Academy Television Awards
- British Academy Television Award for Best Comedy (Programme or Series)
