= 2004 British Academy Television Awards =

UK television awards ceremony

- Date: 18 April 2004
- Site: Grosvenor House Hotel
- Hosted by: Davina McCall

Highlights
- Best Comedy Series: Little Britain
- Best Drama: Buried
- Best Actor: Bill Nighy; State of Play
- Best Actress: Julie Walters; The Canterbury Tales: The Wife of Bath's Tale
- Best Comedy Performance: Ricky Gervais The Office Christmas Special

Television coverage
- Channel: ITV
- Ratings: 6.69 million

The 2004 British Academy Television Awards were held on Sunday 18 April at the Grosvenor House Hotel in Park Lane, London. The ceremony was hosted by Davina McCall and broadcast on ITV the following day.

== Winners ==
- Best Actor
  - Winner: Bill Nighy — State of Play (BBC One)
  - Other nominees: Jim Broadbent — The Young Visiters (BBC One); Christopher Eccleston — The Second Coming (ITV); David Morrissey — State of Play (BBC One)
- Best Actress
  - Winner: Julie Walters — The Canterbury Tales: The Wife of Bath's Tale (BBC One)
  - Other nominees: Gina McKee — The Lost Prince (BBC One); Helen Mirren — Prime Suspect (ITV); Miranda Richardson — The Lost Prince (BBC One)
- Best Comedy (Programme or Series)
  - Winner: Little Britain (BBC / BBC Three)
  - Other nominees: Bo' Selecta! (Talkback Thames / Channel 4); Creature Comforts: Cats or Dogs? (Aardman Animations / ITV); Doubletake (Tiger Aspect Productions / BBC Two)
- Best Comedy Performance
  - Winner: Ricky Gervais — The Office Christmas Special (BBC One)
  - Other nominees: Martin Freeman — The Office Christmas Special (BBC One); Matt Lucas — Little Britain (BBC Three); David Walliams — Little Britain (BBC Three)
- Best Drama Serial
  - Winner: Charles II: The Power and The Passion (BBC / A&E Network / BBC One)
  - Other nominees: Prime Suspect (Granada Television / ITV); The Second Coming (Red Production Company / ITV); State of Play (BBC / Endor Productions / BBC One)
- Best Drama Series
  - Winner: Buried (World Productions / Channel 4)
  - Other nominees: Clocking Off (Red Production Company / BBC One); Foyle's War (Greenlit Productions / ITV); William and Mary (Meridian Broadcasting / ITV)
- Best Single Drama
  - Winner: The Deal (Granada Television / Channel 4)
  - Other nominees: Danielle Cable: Eyewitness (Granada Television / ITV); This Little Life (Common Features / BBC Two); The Canterbury Tales: The Wife of Bath's Tale (BBC / Ziji Productions / BBC One)
- Best Continuing Drama
  - Winner: Coronation Street (Granada Television / ITV)
  - Other nominees: The Bill (Talkback Thames / ITV); Casualty (BBC / BBC One); Holby City (BBC / BBC One)
- Best Current Affairs
  - Winner: The Secret Policeman (BBC / BBC One)
  - Other nominees: John Pilger: Breaking the Silence: Truth and Lies in the War on Terror (Carlton Television / ITV); The Fall of Milosevic (Brook Lapping Productions / BBC2); Terror in Moscow (Mentorn Films / Channel 4)
- Best Entertainment Performance
  - Winner: Jonathan Ross — Friday Night with Jonathan Ross (BBC One)
  - Other nominees: Stephen Fry — QI (BBC Four); Boris Johnson — Have I Got News For You (BBC One); Paul Merton — Have I Got News For You (BBC One)
- Best Factual Series or Strand
  - Winner: The National Trust (Oxford Film and Television / BBC Four)
  - Other nominees: Leonardo (BBC / BBC One); Operatunity (Diverse Productions / Channel 4); Seven Wonders of the Industrial World (BBC / BBC Two)
- Best Feature
  - Winner: Wife Swap (RDF Media / Channel 4)
  - Other nominees: Grand Designs (Talkback Thames / Channel 4); That'll Teach Them (Twenty Twenty Television / Channel 4); Top Gear (BBC / BBC Two)
- Flaherty Award for Single Documentary
  - Winner: One Life: Lager, Mum And Me (BBC / BBC One)
  - Other nominees: My Family and Autism (BBC / BBC Two); Pompeii – The Last Day (BBC / BBC One); Real Life: Being Terri (Anglia Television / ITV)
- Lew Grade Entertainment Programme or Series
  - Winner: Friday Night with Jonathan Ross (Open Mike Productions / BBC One)
  - Other nominees: Ant & Dec's Saturday Night Takeaway (Granada Television / ITV); Have I Got News For You (Hat Trick Productions / BBC One); Pop Idol (Talkback Thames / 19TV / ITV)
- News Coverage
  - Winner: Channel 4 News: The Fall of Saddam (ITN / Channel 4)
  - Other nominees: Newsnight (BBC / BBC Two); Sky News: Fall of Baghdad (Sky News); The Ten O'Clock News (BBC / BBC One)
- Situation Comedy Award
  - Winner: The Office Christmas Special (BBC / BBC One)
  - Other nominees: Hardware (Talkback Thames / ITV); Marion and Geoff (Baby Cow Productions / BBC Two); Peep Show (Objective Productions / Channel 4)
- Sport
  - Winner: Rugby World Cup Final (ITV)
  - Other nominees: Cheltenham Gold Cup Day (Highflyer Productions / Channel 4); London Marathon (BBC / BBC One); Test Cricket (Sunset + Vine / Channel 4)
- The Dennis Potter Award
  - Paul Abbott
- The Alan Clarke Award
  - Beryl Vertue
- The Richard Dimbleby Award
  - Andrew Marr
- Special Awards
  - Adrian Wood
