= La oficina (TV series) =

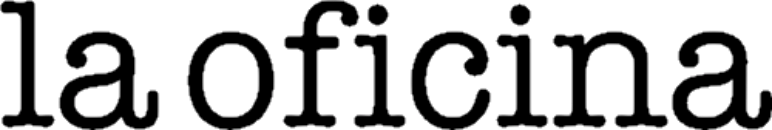
- Genre: Mockumentary; Sitcom; Workplace comedy
- Based on: The Office by: Ricky Gervais; Stephen Merchant
- Showrunner: Marcos Bucay
- Starring: Fernando Bonilla; Fabrizio Santini; Elena del Río; Edgar Villa
- Composers: Javier Nuño; Joe Rodríguez
- Country of origin: Mexico
- Original language: Spanish
- No. of seasons: 1
- No. of episodes: 8

Production
- Executive producers: David Kirwan; Evan Gelb; Valeria de León; Moisés Chiver; Gary Alazraki; Marcos Bucay
- Producer: Adrián Ituarte
- Cinematography: Francisco Iñigo
- Editors: Luisa María Martínez Arcaraz; Ricardo Poery
- Production companies: Máquina Vega; Amazon MGM Studios

Original release
- Network: Amazon Prime Video
- Release: 13 March 2026 – present

Related
- The Office (franchise)

La oficina is a Mexican mockumentary sitcom television series. It is based on the British series The Office created by Ricky Gervais and Stephen Merchant, being the fourteenth adaptation overall and the second Spanish-language of the franchise, after the Chilean iteration. The show follows the day-to-day lives of office employees in the Aguascalientes branch of the fictional Olimpo Soaps company. It premiered on Amazon Prime Video on 13 March 2026.

In April 2026, the series was renewed for a second season.

== Cast ==
=== Main ===
- Fernando Bonilla as Jerónimo Ponce III: regional manager and heir to the Olimpo Soap company. He's an eccentric boss who tries to please everyone, but ends up making them uncomfortable.
- Fabrizio Santini as Memo Guerrero: sales representative at Olimpo Soaps. He is a jokester who enjoys making Aniv's life miserable, and has a crush on Sofi.
- Elena del Río as Sofi Campos: head of customer service at Olimpo Soaps. She is a laid-back young woman and a friend of Memo, whom she sees as an ally with whom she can endure the office life.
- Edgar Villa as Aniv Rubio: sales executive and Jerónimo's assistant. He firmly believes in his boss's ideas and decisions and genuinely believes he is a great leader.
- Armando Espitia as Qwerty: an IT specialist who is only skilled in basic office software such as Word and Excel.
- Paola Flores as Betty Benítez: a secretary and longtime employee at Olimpo Soaps who knows all the company’s secrets.
- Arelí González as Ángeles Leyva: a quality control manager with a reserved personality.
- Alexa Zuart as Mine Romero: a marketing specialist tasked with protecting the company's image. She always tries to look her best, however, she’s known for having the best gossip in the office.
- Rodrigo Suárez as Giancarlo: head of brand ambassadors at Olimpo Soaps. Giancarlo is gay, but he has turned his life around after going to conversion therapy, deceiving himself by identifying as "straight".
- Juan Carlos Medellín as Lucio Galván: the company's lawyer, who shies away from confrontation and does everything he can to avoid working on cases.
- Alejandra Ley as Abi Delgado: a sales representative at Olimpo Soaps. Resourceful and with a natural talent for informal business, she runs a small shop within the office where she sells supplies and snacks.
- Arturo Vinales as Cañedo: a worker whose true nature remains hidden. Jerónimo says: "The less that is known about Cañedo, the better".
- Quetzalli Cortés as Ivan Mondragón "Mondra": the human resources representative for the Aguascalientes branch of Olimpo Soaps. He is known for trying to follow the rules of what's correct, which is why Jerónimo despises him, and also because he's from Mexico City.
- Erika de la Rosa as Juana Alpízar: Vice President at Olimpo Soaps who tries to bring order to the chaos caused by Jerónimo.
- Guillermo Quintanilla as Don Abel: accountant at Olimpo Soaps, known for his old-fashioned ways. He prefers to print out emails, handle cash, and keep detailed records of every expense.

=== Recurring and guest stars ===
- Gustavo Hernández de Anda as Rubén: an employee who quits after being fed up with Jerónimo's antics.
- Agustín Ocegueda as the Alpha certifier
- Alejandro de Hoyos as Pascal: Sofi's boyfriend and deputy manager of Hyatt Aguascalientes.
- Israel Islas as Bufis: a warehouse employee at Olimpo Soaps.
- José Manuel Rincón as Vicente García Ponce: Jerónimo's cousin and regional manager of the Zacatecas branch.
- Alejandro Guerrero as Charlie: a janitor of the building in which the Olimpo Soaps office is located.
- Mario León as El Jimmy: a homeless person brought in to motivate the Olimpo Soaps employees.
- Lucía Gómez Robledo as Dany: an employee from the corporate office in Mexico City who comes to Aguascalientes to give a harassment prevention training course.
- Dagoberto Gama as Don Lover, owner of the Casa Lover motel chain
- Angélica Rogel as Perla, an adjudicator at the Handwashing Day event
- Humberto Zurita as Jerónimo Ponce II

== Episodes ==
No.	Title	Directed by	Written by	Original release date	Prod. code
1	"El círculo"	Gary Alazraki	Marcos Bucay	13 March 2026	OFMX101
Juana from the corporate office informs Jerónimo that he did not obtain the Alpha-9000 certification and threatens to close the Aguascalientes branch if he does not repeat the process. The office staff come up with a plan to convince Jerónimo to repeat the process.
2	"Quincena"	Marcos Bucay	Diego Graue	13 March 2026	OFMX102
Jerónimo tries to get noticed in the social section of the magazine Bajío VIP, so he organizes a mandatory karaoke and shot night for his employees and withholds their paychecks to force them to show up. Meanwhile, Memo and Sofi trick Aniv into taking some melatonin gummies, making him believe its testosterone, so he won't go to the party. Ángeles snaps and reveals to Jerónimo that no one wants to spend their free time with him. Jerónimo gives the staff their paychecks and cancels the party, but they decide to attend after seeing him upset.
3	"Motivación"	Marcos Bucay	Roberto Flores	13 March 2026	OFMX103
After two resignations within a year, Juana tells Jerónimo he needs to motivate his employees. He brings in Jimmy, a homeless person to show the staff how privileged they are to be working at Olimpo Soaps. However, Jimmy reveals that he makes $1,000 a day doing different jobs, which leads the staff to ask for raises. Jerónimo informs them that their raises were denied and to show them that money causes problems, he performs a play based on his troubled childhood. Meanwhile, Memo and Sofi hide Aniv's model plane.
4	"A fuego lento"	Gary Alazraki	Laura Villa	13 March 2026	OFMX104
To obtain the Alpha certification, the staff must take a harassment prevention course. Jerónimo is infatuated with Dany, the instructor, because a fortune cookie predicted he would find love. During the training course, Jerónimo shows his lack of discretion with his inappropriate behavior. Meanwhile, Memo and Sofi tell Aniv that Dany likes him, putting his loyalty to Jerónimo to the test.
5	"El original"	Diego Graue	Marcos Bucay	13 March 2026	OFMX105
The corporate office organizes a vote to decide whether to keep the classic detergent box design or replace it with a more modern one. Jerónimo decides to sabotage the election since he is featured on the classic packaging. He enlists Memo as his campaign manager and Aniv to do the dirty work. Jerónimo wins the election and keeps the classic design, but his image is replaced by a girl. Meanwhile, Sofi breaks up with her boyfriend, Pascal, and gets upset with Memo when she overhears him saying that they are a toxic, codependent couple because of their on-again, off-again relationship. Pascal shows up at the office and proposes to Sofi, who accepts.
6	"Sincronizados"	Mark Alazraki	Mandy Otero	13 March 2026	OFMX106
The office staff must answer a job satisfaction survey and Jerónimo wants to spoil them so that they respond favorably. He gives the women the day off as they are experiencing synchronized periods, while he offers the men a rooftop barbecue, leaving Aniv to do everyone's work. Juana arrives and shuts down the barbecue and orders for the woman to come back to work. Jerónimo offers the conference room for the women to relax and hires manicurists to pamper them. The Aguascalientes branch ends up in third place of the best place to work in.
7	"Don Lover"	Marcos Bucay	Marcos Bucay, Laura Villa & Mandy Otero	13 March 2026	OFMX107
Olimpo Soaps loses a major account with Casa Lover, a love motel chain, and Jero joins Juana in an effort to win it back. Don Lover says he didn't renew his contract with Olimpo because he doesn't feel valued by them, since they don't include the Casa Lover logo in their advertising. Meanwhile, Aniv stays in charge of the office and devises an austerity plan to make up for the funds lost from the account. As a last resort to get his account back, Jerónimo jumps into the motel pool and takes a sip of the water. Don Lover is left impressed and decides to renew his account. Afterwards, Jerónimo and Juana end up sleeping together.
8	"Lávate las manos"	Marcos Bucay	Roberto Flores & Diego Graue	13 March 2026	OFMX108
It's International Handwashing Day and the Aguascalientes branch has passed the Alpha-9000 certification. Because of this, Jerónimo's father comes to visit him to tell him he can now sell the Olimpo Soaps company, but Jerónimo refuses to sign the sales agreement. Meanwhile, Sofi is in charge of making the largest bar of soap in Mexico and wants to break the record set last year.

== Production ==
=== Development ===
The series was announced on 23 October 2024. The series is the fourteenth adaptation in the franchise, and the second Spanish-language series. It is co-produced by Amazon MGM Studios and Máquina Vega. Mexican screenwriter Gary Alazraki serves as the director and executive producer, with Marcos Bucay as the showrunner of the series. The premise of the series is set in Aguascalientes where the regional manager for Jabones Olimpo, isn't cut out to oversee the personal care company.

On 6 April 2026, Prime Video renewed the series for a second season.

=== Casting ===
In June 2025, Fernando Bonilla and Edgar Villa were announced to be starring in the series. In October 2025, Fabrizio Santini and Elena del Río joined the cast. In December 2025, Alejandra Ley and Alexa Zuart joined the cast.

== Release ==
The series premiered on 13 March 2026, on Amazon Prime Video, with all eight episodes released at once.
