= The Office Christmas specials =

Christmas Special
- The Office episodes
- DVD cover
- Episode nos.: Episodes 1 and 2
- Directed by: Ricky Gervais; Stephen Merchant
- Written by: Ricky Gervais; Stephen Merchant
- Original air dates: 26 December 2003; 27 December 2003
- Running time: 45 minutes (Part 1); 50 minutes (Part 2)

The Office Christmas specials are the two-part series finale episodes of the British mockumentary comedy television series The Office. The specials were commissioned after the series' creators, Ricky Gervais and Stephen Merchant, announced that they would not write a full third series of the show. The first 45-minute part was broadcast on BBC One on 26 December 2003, and the second 50-minute part was shown the following evening. The episodes are presented in the style of "revisited" documentaries common on British television, in which series such as Airport are brought back for one-off specials several years after the series concluded. David Brent (Gervais), forcibly made redundant at the end of the second series, is now a travelling salesman of cleaning supplies. Tim Canterbury (Martin Freeman) and Gareth Keenan (Mackenzie Crook) are still working at the offices of Wernham Hogg, and former Wernham Hogg receptionist Dawn Tinsley (Lucy Davis), now living in Florida, is flown back to Britain by the documentary crew to reunite with her old colleagues.

The episodes won various awards, including two British Academy Television Awards, a Royal Television Society award, and a Television Critics Association (America) award. They were also nominated for a British Comedy Award and a Primetime Emmy Award.

== Plot ==
=== Part 1 ===
Three years after the filming of the original documentary, its makers revisit the office to see what the staff members are doing now. After being made redundant from Wernham Hogg, David Brent (Ricky Gervais) is now a travelling salesman who, following a failed single release of a cover of "If You Don't Know Me By Now", leeches off what little fame he has in a series of demeaning nightclub appearances. Dawn Tinsley (Lucy Davis) lives in Florida with fiancé Lee (Joel Beckett), who is bouncing from job to job as they live with his sister rent-free and hidden from immigration authorities. In the office, Gareth Keenan (Mackenzie Crook) is now the general manager and Tim Canterbury (Martin Freeman) is still trapped in a job he hates with an obnoxious, pregnant desk-mate Anne (Elizabeth Berrington). Despite leaving Wernham Hogg three years ago, Brent still visits the office to see the staff and "keep up the morale". This irritates both Gareth and David's former boss Neil Godwin (Patrick Baladi). When the programme makers offer to fly Dawn and Lee back for the office Christmas party, along with the appearance of David Brent, the scene is set for a reunion.

=== Part 2 ===
Brent does not have a date for the Christmas party, but tells Neil that he does. With Gareth's help, he searches Internet romance websites for suitable women, and arranges three dates. All go badly. Dawn returns to Britain and arrives at the office. She and Tim immediately recreate old times by winding up Gareth. Brent pushes Neil's patience too far when he brings his dog into the office to show to the staff. Neil bars Brent from the office and later stops anyone who does not work for Wernham Hogg from going to the Christmas dinner. At the party, Brent anxiously awaits his fourth date. When the woman, Carol, arrives, she and Brent hit it off straight away. Lee tells Dawn that it is time to leave, and she and Tim say awkward goodbyes.

In the taxi, Dawn opens her "Secret Santa" present: an oil painting set from Tim with the words, "Never give up" written next to her sketch of him, which she had made earlier in the day. Brent walks his date to her car and she gestures through the window for him to call her. Returning to the office, Chris Finch (Ralph Ineson) insults her, and Brent tells him bluntly, "Chris, why don't you fuck off?". In the final scenes, Dawn returns to the office, having broken up with Lee, and kisses Tim. The office staff gather for a group photo. Brent asks to have a group photo of just him and the "old gang". While David, Tim, Dawn, Gareth, and the rest of the office members gather round for the photo, David makes his colleagues laugh with an impersonation of Frank Spencer.

== Production ==
Gervais and Stephen Merchant had announced that they would not write a third series of The Office even after the overwhelming success of the second. In an interview published in Heat in May 2003, Gervais announced that he and Merchant had begun writing a two-part Christmas special. Merchant joked that it would be the "same jokes, but with tinsel and David Brent in a Santa outfit".

The episode was filmed between August and September. Scenes set in Florida were filmed in Spain. Anne, Tim's new desk-mate, was written to be an even more annoying character than Gareth.

That November, a beauty technician from Saffron Walden called Joanne Hiley claimed to have been sent the scripts in the post by mistake. Although technically illegal in the UK, she announced to The Sun that she intended to sell them. The Daily Mail purchased the scripts and revealed most of the plot in an article published four weeks before the broadcast. In a BBC Radio 1 Newsbeat interview, Gervais asked for a newspaper or magazine to buy the scripts and return them to the BBC as "a little Christmas present to the nation".

== Reception ==
The second series of The Office averaged four million viewers per week when it was broadcast on BBC Two. To get as many viewers as possible for the Christmas specials, the BBC's director of television Jana Bennet allowed it to be moved to BBC One. The ratings were deemed a success by the BBC; Part 1 received 7.17 million viewers and a 30.97% share of the audience, and Part 2 received 6.14 million viewers and a 25.66% share. Part 1 was the third most popular programme on Boxing Day for 16- to 34-year-olds.

A "clerical error" at the BBC meant Gervais was initially omitted for consideration for a British Academy Television Award for Best Comedy Performance in 2004. Crook, Freeman and Davis were all long-listed for the award. A last-minute reprieve allowed Gervais to be included on the list, and he went on to win the BAFTA for Best Comedy Performance. Freeman had also been shortlisted. The specials themselves won in the Best Situation Comedy category. The award was presented to Gervais, Merchant and producer Ash Atalla. At the Royal Television Society Programming Awards, the specials won in the Situation Comedy and Comedy Drama category. The RTS jury commented "The problem of writing a final episode of a much-loved comedy was fully resolved. Tim gets Dawn. Dawn gets her oil paints. Brent gets the girl and we are carried along with it all. Perfection!" Gervais was also nominated in the Comedy Performance category. The specials were nominated for Best TV Comedy at the British Comedy Awards, but lost to Little Britain, though Gervais and Merchant won the Writer of the Year award.

The specials were broadcast in the United States on 21 October 2004. BBC America merged both parts into a single 95-minute episode entitled The Office Special. The making-of documentary How I Made the Office, previously released on the Series 1 DVD, was broadcast after the special. In a preview in The Hollywood Reporter, Cynthia Littleton highlighted the scene where Brent tells Carol that the documentary crew edited his antics to make him look like a fool as being true to life, comparing it to the various real-life lawsuits filed by Survivor contestants against CBS. Littleton also commented positively on the scene where Gareth asks Brent to "call ahead", and Brent's music video. In The New York Times, Alessandra Stanley wrote that the specials are "as wickedly, painfully funny as the first two seasons and, in tiny, fleeting doses, as delicately tender".

The following year it was nominated for the Primetime Emmy Award for Outstanding Made for Television Movie. Gervais and Merchant received a nomination for Outstanding Writing for a Miniseries, Movie or a Dramatic Special. The episodes won in the Outstanding Achievement in Movies, Mini-series & Specials category at the American Television Critics Association Awards. The award was collected by Lucy Davis.

The specials appeared at No. 4 on Channel 4's 100 Greatest Christmas Moments polls in 2004.

== Home media ==
The specials were released on VHS and DVD in the UK on 25 October 2004 by BBC Video. Extra features include an audio commentary on Part 2 by Merchant and Gervais, a retrospective documentary entitled The Office: Closed For Business, the full video for Brent's version of "If You Don't Know Me By Now", a featurette about the cast and crew collecting the Golden Globes, and a studio version of "Free Love Freeway"—Brent's song from Series 1, Episode 4. It was released in the United States on 16 November 2004 with the same special features.
