= Tim Canterbury =

Fictional character from The Office (UK)

- The Office character
- First appearance: 'Downsize' (2001)
- Last appearance: 'Christmas Special' (2003)
- Created by: Ricky Gervais; Stephen Merchant
- Portrayed by: Martin Freeman

In-universe information
- Occupation: Sales representative
- Significant other: Dawn Tinsley
- Nationality: British

Tim Canterbury is a fictional character in the BBC sitcom The Office, portrayed by Martin Freeman. He is a sales representative at the Slough branch of Wernham Hogg Paper Merchants. He has a self-deprecating and ironic sense of humour.

Tim flirts with, and feels great attraction to, the receptionist Dawn Tinsley. His office nemesis is Gareth Keenan, with whom he regularly exchanges insults and on whom he frequently plays practical jokes. His relationship with his boss David Brent is mixed; at times Tim seems to get along well with David, and often patiently humours Brent's attempts at comedy and social interaction. However, like the other employees, he is often exasperated by Brent's more extreme personality flaws.

In many ways, he is Brent's complete opposite. While Brent tends to alienate people with his constant displays of arrogance and insecurities, Tim is liked by almost everyone due largely to his kindness, his cheeky-chappy sense of humour and his caring nature. However, he lives an unsatisfying life – at thirty, he still lives with his parents and works in a job for which he has no passion or interest. Having dropped out of university after a year, he hopes to return and earn a Psychology degree, but his hidden insecurity prevents him from doing so. His regular pranks on Gareth are one of his ways of maintaining his sanity.

At the end of the first season, Tim abandons his plan to quit his office job and return to university to earn a degree in Psychology. He reveals to Dawn that David Brent has "promoted" him to Senior Sales Clerk, which includes a raise of £500. As Tim relays this information, he begins speaking in a distinctly Brent-esque style, using vague syllogisms and empty phrases with no clear meaning behind them. He also backpedals on a lot of the career advice he previously gave to Dawn and suggests that his new title has set him upon a more desirable path.

In the second series, although Tim retains much of his former ironic humour, much of his self-deprecation is absent. Despite his promotion being little more than tokenistic, he takes his job much more seriously and insists that others do the same. This suggests a potential parallel between Tim and David Brent in terms of their career trajectory: the casual and flippant attitude being discarded upon receiving a taste of authority, however insignificant, and buying into the corporate, pencil-pushing mentality.

Tim's equivalent in the American version of The Office is Jim Halpert. His French equivalents are Paul Delorme (played by Jeremie Elkaim) and Louis Tremblay.

== Relationship with Dawn Tinsley ==
Apart from being her colleague and close friend, Tim harbours strong feelings for Dawn. Their relationship is very flirtatious at times. However, Dawn's engagement to Lee prevents them from becoming more than friends for quite some time. Their friendship seems to suffer after the episode Training Day, in which Dawn and Lee are having problems. Tim consoles her throughout the episode, but mistakenly comes to the conclusion that Lee and Dawn have split. He then asks Dawn out on a date in front of everyone, where she tells him that she and Lee are still together. Humiliated, Tim insists he was just asking her out as a friend.

During the second series, Dawn and Tim remain friends, but do not seem to be as close anymore. Tim starts to take his job more seriously after being promoted and becomes somewhat distant toward Dawn at first. Tim also begins to date Rachel, one of the former Swindon employees, and Dawn grows jealous, along with Gareth, who claims he had feelings for Rachel before Tim and does not understand why she wants to go out with someone who "looks like a Fisher Price Man".

In the fifth episode of the second series, Dawn is selling kisses for Red Nose Day. After Tim makes a contribution, they share a kiss. Tim is then driven to choose between Rachel and Dawn, unaware of Dawn and Lee's plans to move to the United States. In the next episode he makes his decision, breaking up with Rachel.

Tim soon discovers that Dawn is leaving for Florida with Lee. Initially Tim seems reluctant to say anything, but changes his mind during an interview with the camera crew and runs to tell Dawn how he feels. Their conversation is kept private as Tim takes off his microphone, but he emerges downbeat and admits Dawn said no. The second series ends with both Dawn and Tim depressed.

Three years pass, with Tim remaining complacent in his job at Wernham Hogg and Dawn living unhappily with Lee in Florida. Dawn and Lee are flown back for the reunion, and she resumes her friendship with Tim briefly. When Dawn receives a Secret Santa Christmas present, she opens it in the taxi on the way home whereupon, thanks to an illustration of him on Wernham Hogg headed paper she drew earlier, she discovers it is from Tim, encouraging her to hold on to her dream of becoming an illustrator, with a note saying "NEVER GIVE UP". She returns to the Christmas party without Lee, where she and Tim kiss and finally become a couple.

== See also ==
- Jim Halpert – Tim's equivalent in the American version of The Office.
