= Mackenzie Crook =

English actor, director, comedian and writer

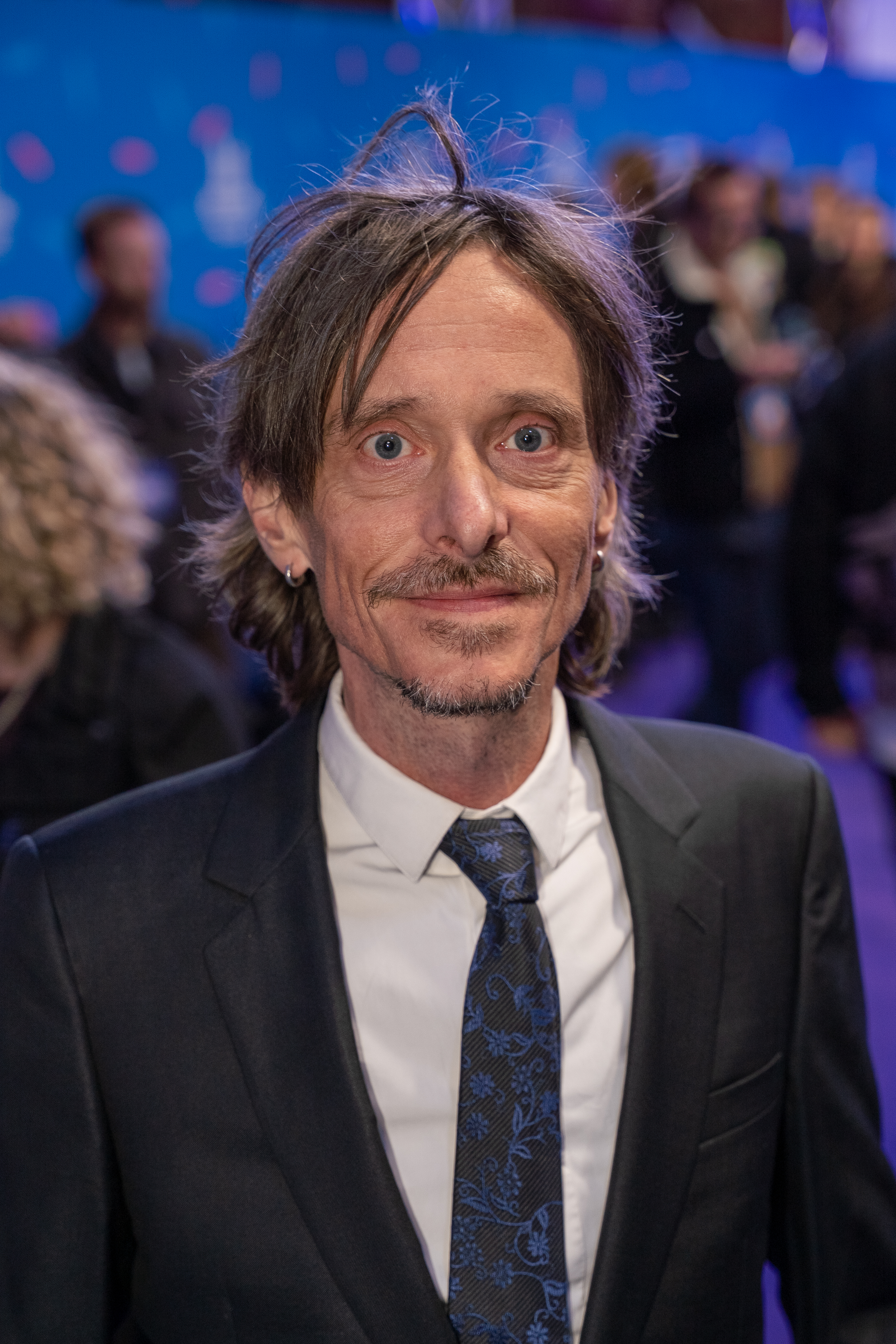
- Crook in 2026
- Born: Paul James Crook; 1971 (age 54–55); Maidstone, Kent, England
- Occupations: Actor; director; comedian; writer
- Years active: 1996–present
- Spouse: Lindsay Crook (m. 2001)
- Children: 2
- Website: lisathomasmanagement.com/mackenzie-crook/

Mackenzie Crook (born 1971 as Paul James Crook) is an English actor, director, comedian, and writer, best known for his roles in television and film. He gained widespread recognition for portraying Gareth Keenan in the British sitcom The Office (2001–2003) and for his role as Ragetti in the Pirates of the Caribbean film series (2003–2007). He also played Orell in the HBO series Game of Thrones, and the title role of Worzel Gummidge (2019–2022), which he wrote and directed.

Crook has also worked extensively in theatre, including a Tony Award-nominated performance in Jerusalem.

== Early life and education ==
Crook was born Paul James Crook in Maidstone, Kent, England, and grew up in Dartford, Kent. As a child he received a course of hormone therapy for three years to treat a growth hormone deficiency.

Crook attended Sutton-at-Hone Primary School and then Wilmington Grammar School for Boys. As there was no drama department at his grammar school, he joined a local youth theatre. He has said that he failed his A-levels because he "completely lost interest" after his GCSEs. In the summers, he spent time at his uncle's tobacco farm Chindito, in Gutu District, central Zimbabwe, where he developed a love for painting.

Crook's first jobs included working at a Pizza Hut restaurant and at Halfords, where he felt he was "waiting for real life to start".

After moving to London when he was in his early twenties, Crook worked on the comedy circuit, appearing as two characters he created, Mr. Bagshaw and Charlie Cheese. He went on to appear in shows at the Edinburgh Fringe, where he was spotted by Bob Mortimer.

Crook changed his name when joining Equity, the actors' union, not to be confused with another actor named Paul Crook. His name Mackenzie came from his family's former surname, Mackenzie-Crook.

== Career ==
=== Film and television ===
One of Crook's earliest television appearances was in the 1998 Channel 4 sketch show Barking, where he played the grotesque schoolteacher Mr Bagshaw, who was said to be based on a variety of obnoxious overbearing science teachers Crook had in school. In 1998, Crook was offered his first major television role as a comedy sketch contributor on Channel 4's The Eleven O'Clock Show, from which he was later dropped. He was later a member of the main cast of the BBC sketch show TV to Go in 2001.

In late 1999, he hosted the short-lived ITV1 show Comedy Café as his Charlie Cheese character. The show, made by Channel X for ITV1, had Cheese interviewing celebrities about their latest live tour, book, album or film release.

In 2001, Crook auditioned for the role of Gareth Keenan in Ricky Gervais' and Stephen Merchant's popular mockumentary The Office. Though it was originally written for a larger, thuggish actor, Crook won the role, and in 2001 he was nominated for a British Comedy Award for Best Comedy Breakthrough Artist.

Crook featured in Pirates of the Caribbean: The Curse of the Black Pearl (2003), Pirates of the Caribbean: Dead Man's Chest (2006), and Pirates of the Caribbean: At World's End (2007), as Ragetti, a pirate with a comically ill-fitting wooden false eye, who is teamed with Pintel (Lee Arenberg).

Crook has appeared in advertisements as the character for Visa and M&M's. He has also been heard as himself in adverts for MTV and Film4, and as a voiceover artiste for motor insurance company Green Flag in 2007. In 2010, he narrated an advertisement for electrical retailer Currys.

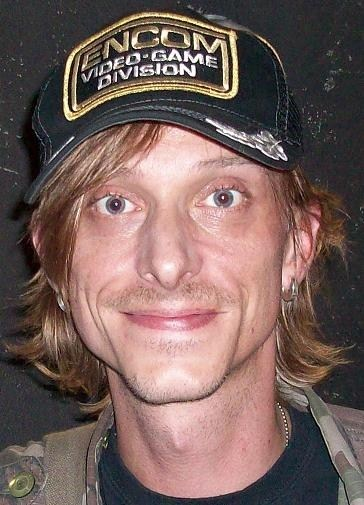
Crook in 2009

Crook appeared as Launcelot Gobbo in Michael Radford's 2004 film adaptation of Shakespeare's The Merchant of Venice, and had a minor role in the 2004 film Finding Neverland as a theatre usher. His other film appearances include The Gathering (2003) and The Brothers Grimm (2005).

He has starred in three of Tim Plester and Ben Gregor's short films: as Gary Tibbs in Ant Muzak (2002), as Servalan in Blake's Junction 7 (2004), and as Glorious George in World of Wrestling (2006), all released on DVD. He has done voice-over in the TV series Modern Toss, was featured in I Want Candy as Mr. Dulberg, a quirky university professor; and voiced Rolli Bobbler in the English version of an animated film from Finland called Quest for a Heart (original Finnish name Röllin Sydän). He also performed a duet with Ricky Gervais in the 2007 Concert for Diana.

Crook played the leading role of Paul Callow in the comedy film Three and Out, released on 25 April 2008. On 10 May 2008 he appeared in an episode of the BBC1 comedy/drama Love Soup playing the character Marty Cady and appeared in an episode of Andrew Davies' 2008 BBC adaptation of Charles Dickens' Little Dorrit. He also provided his voice and movements to a character in Steven Spielberg's The Adventures of Tintin: The Secret of the Unicorn, which began filming in January 2009 and was released in 2011.

Crook starred in Wyndham Price's drama Abraham's Point as Comet Snape and appeared in City of Ember as Looper, and on TV was featured in the documentary Tattoos: A Scarred History (2009). He also appeared in Big Brother: Celebrity Hijack and the ITV drama Demons (originally titled The Last Van Helsing) as the vampire Gladiolus Hadilus Tradius Thrip. In January 2009, Crook assisted in the second and third episodes of the third series of the E4 teen drama Skins, where he played psychotic Bristol gangster Johnny White. In September 2009, he appeared in Merlin, for the first episode of the second season, as Cedric.

In November 2010, Crook starred in A Reluctant Tragic Hero, a comic play by Anton Chekhov, on the Sky Arts channel, which also starred Johnny Vegas, with whom he also starred in 2004's Sex Lives of the Potato Men, a film about the sexual antics of a group of potato delivery men in Birmingham. Crook played Corporal Buckley, a brutal career soldier, in Jimmy McGovern's Accused, broadcast on BBC One in November 2010. During the 2012 San Diego Comic-Con it was announced that Crook would play the role of Orell in the third season of Game of Thrones.

Crook also wrote, directed and starred in the television comedy series Detectorists, which was first broadcast on BBC Four on 2 October 2014. Filmed in the countryside of Suffolk and the market town of Framlingham, the show is a gently humorous and affectionate portrayal of a pair of metal-detecting enthusiasts, Andy (Crook) and Lance (Toby Jones), and their colleagues in the fictional Danebury Metal Detecting Club. In 2015, Crook won a British Academy Television Craft Award for Best Writing in a Comedy Series for the show, whilst the series won the British Academy Television Award for Best Situation Comedy. A second series was broadcast in the UK in October/November 2015. A Christmas special was broadcast on 23 December 2015. In 2017 the third and final series of Detectorists was broadcast. A final special episode was released for Christmas 2022.

Crook played the role of Nestor of Maddox in the television fantasy-comedy series Yonderland, broadcast on Sky One, which starred and was written by the cast of the educational historical comedy series Horrible Histories. He plays the father of the main character Debbie, played by Martha Howe-Douglas, and appears in three episodes of series 2: episodes 1, 2 and 4.

In 2026, Crook wrote and directed the sitcom Small Prophets, which stars Pearce Quigley (also from Detectorists), Lauren Patel, Michael Palin, and himself.

=== Theatre ===
Crook played Billy Bibbit in the 2004 London West End production of the stage play of One Flew Over the Cuckoo's Nest opposite Christian Slater, and in 2006 he appeared in The Exonerated at the Riverside Studios in Hammersmith.

He starred in director Ian Rickson's production of The Seagull opposite Kristin Scott Thomas, as the troubled writer Konstantin for which he earned a nomination from the Evening Standard Theatre Awards. Starting at the Royal Court Theatre in London in February/March 2007, it transferred to Broadway in September 2008. In December 2008, he finished the Broadway run of The Seagull at the Walter Kerr Theatre.

From 15 July to 15 August 2009, Crook appeared at the Royal Court in Jez Butterworth's Jerusalem. He and the play received positive reviews and it was transferred to the West End's Apollo Theatre in February 2010. In May 2011 he was nominated for the Tony Award for Best Featured Actor in a Play, for his role in the Broadway transfer of the show, and also appeared in the 2011 London revival. Another revival of the play ran in 2022 at the Apollo Theatre, featuring the creative team from the first production as well as Mark Rylance and Crook in their original roles as Johnny "Rooster" Byron and Ginger.

On 18 April 2010, Crook took part in the fund raising event We Are One, a celebration of tribal peoples, in aid of indigenous rights organisation Survival International, at the Apollo Theatre, Shaftesbury Avenue. The evening was a performance of tribal prose and poetry from some of the UK and Hollywood's leading actors and musicians. The event was created and directed by Mark Rylance. Crook appeared as Jasper in The Aliens at the Bush Theatre in October 2010. In early 2012 he played Sergeant Kite in The Recruiting Officer at the Donmar Warehouse.

=== Other work ===
Crook has directed a music video for the London electro band Paw Paw (his sister Zoe is one of the band members). The stop motion animation video accompanies the band's debut single 'Wired OK', released on 16 July 2007 on Albino Recordings.

Crook appeared as a postman in the music video for Paul McCartney's single "Dance Tonight" alongside actress Natalie Portman. The video for the song was directed by Michel Gondry and was posted exclusively on YouTube on 22 May 2007.

Crook has a deal with publisher Faber to illustrate and write a children's book. His first one, The Windvale Sprites, was released in November 2011. It was announced on 8 February 2012, that Crook's book was nominated for the Waterstones Children's Book Prize, in the 5–12-year-old category. The book contains references to a storm in 1987 which hit Dartford and surrounding areas.

On 9 April 2010, it was announced that Crook would star in the music video for Slow Club's new single, "Giving Up on Love", after band member Rebecca Taylor wrote to him.

Crook regularly works in radio, and appeared in the BBC Radio Four show North by Northamptonshire, in 2011 alongside Geoffrey Palmer, Sheila Hancock, Lizzie Roper and Jessica Henwick.

Crook narrated the audiobook version of the novel Charlotte Street by Danny Wallace.

In June 2024, it was announced that Crook would direct the second series of Bridget Christie's Channel 4 comedy-drama about menopause The Change.

Crook has written two children's books: The Windvale Sprites and The Lost Journals of Benjamin Tooth. His first book written for adults, If Nick Drake Came To My House, was set for release in November 2024.

== Personal life ==
Crook is an atheist. He and his wife Lindsay, a former advertising executive, live in Muswell Hill, London. They were married in April 2001 and have a son and a daughter.

== Filmography ==
=== Film ===
Year	Title	Role	Notes
1996	The Man who Fell in Love with a Traffic Cone	The Man	Short film
1998	Still Crazy	Dutch Kid	
2002	Ant Muzak	Gary Tibbs	Short film
2003	Pirates of the Caribbean: The Curse of the Black Pearl	Ragetti	Nominated – Empire Award for Best Newcomer
2003	The Gathering	The Gathering	
2004	The Merchant of Venice	Launcelot Gobbo	
2004	Sex Lives of the Potato Men	Ferris	
2004	The Life and Death of Peter Sellers	Car Salesman	
2004	Churchill: The Hollywood Years	Jimmy Charoo	
2004	Finding Neverland	Mr. Jaspers	
2004	Blake's Junction 7	Servalan	Short film
2005	Spider-Plant Man	Scientist	Short film
2005	The Brothers Grimm	Hidlick	
2006	Land of the Blind	Editor	
2006	Pirates of the Caribbean: Dead Man's Chest	Ragetti	
2006	World of Wrestling	Glorious George	Short film
2007	Quest for a Heart (Original title: Röllin sydän)	Rölli (voice)	English language version of Finnish original
2007	I Could Never Be Your Woman	Producer	
2007	Pirates of the Caribbean: At World's End	Ragetti	
2007	I Want Candy	Dulberg	
2008	Three and Out	Paul Callow	
2008	City of Ember	Looper	
2009	Solomon Kane	Father Michael	
2010	Sex & Drugs & Rock & Roll	Russell Hardy	
2011	Ironclad	Daniel Marks	
2011	The Adventures of Tintin: The Secret of the Unicorn	Tom (voice)	
2012	Cheerful Weather for the Wedding	David Dakin	
2012	I am Tom Moody	Tom Moody (voice)	
2013	In Secret	Grivet	
2013	One Chance	Braddon	
2014	Muppets Most Wanted	Silent Guard at Prado Museum	
2017	Eat Locals	Larousse	
2018	Christopher Robin	Newspaper Seller	
2019	Tales from the Lodge	Joe	

=== Television ===
Year	Title	Role	Notes
1998	The 11 O'Clock Show	Himself	
2001–2003	The Office	Gareth Keenan	14 episodes Nominated – British Comedy Award for Best Comedy Newcomer
2003	Spine Chillers	Grishnack	Episode: "Goths"
2005	Monkey Trousers	Various characters	
2006	Popetown	Various roles	Voice only Also writer
2006	Modern Toss	Various roles	Voice only
2008	Little Dorrit	Harris	1 episode
2008	Love Soup	Marty Cady	Episode: "Human Error"
2009	Merlin	Cedric	Episode: "The Curse of Cornelius Sigan"
2009	Demons	Gladiolus Thrip	2 episodes
2009	Skins	Johnny White	2 episodes
2010	Chekhov Comedy Shorts	Murashkin	Episode: "A Reluctant Tragic Hero"
2010	Accused	Lance Corporal Alan Buckley	Episode: "Frankie's Story"
2013	Disney Infinity	Ragetti (voice)	Video game
2013	Game of Thrones	Orell	6 episodes Nominated – Screen Actors Guild Award for Outstanding Performance by an Ensemble in a Drama Series
2013	Almost Human	Rudy Lom	
2013	The Cafe	Dave	2 episodes
2014–2022	Detectorists	Andy Stone	20 episodes; Writer and director BAFTA Television Craft Award for Best Writing in a Comedy Series; BAFTA Television Award for Best Situation Comedy
2015	Ordinary Lies	'Paracetamol' Pete	6 episodes
2015	Yonderland	Nester of Maddox	3 episodes
2018–2021	Britannia	Veran/Harka	
2018	Watership Down	Hawkbit	TV miniseries
2019–2021	Worzel Gummidge	Worzel	6 episodes Writer and director
2021	Lake	The Detectorist (voice)	Video game
2025	The Wayfinders	Goran	Season 1
2026	Small Prophets	Gordon	6 episodes: Creator, writer and executive producer
