= Gareth Keenan =

Fictional character from The Office (British TV series)

- First appearance: 'Downsize' (2001)
- Last appearance: Concert for Diana (2007)
- Created by: Ricky Gervais; Stephen Merchant
- Portrayed by: Mackenzie Crook

In-universe information
- Title(s): Lieutenant (Territorial Army)
- Occupation: Assistant 'to the' Regional Manager; Team Leader (TL)
- Nationality: British

Gareth Keenan (born 17 April 1971) is a fictional paper salesman from the BBC sitcom The Office, portrayed by Mackenzie Crook. Gareth is a self-important team leader proud of his alleged Lieutenant status in the Territorial Army. He spends his days annoying his co-workers at Wernham Hogg with his rigid enforcement of the rules and sycophantic attitude towards his manager, David Brent, whom he views as a friend.

Gareth describes his job title as "Assistant Regional Manager", but Brent often corrects this to "Assistant to the Regional Manager". His counterpart on the American series is Dwight Schrute. Keenan was originally meant to be a tough military character but, after Crook's audition, Ricky Gervais and Stephen Merchant decided to reinterpret the character.

In a 2021 interview, Crook expressed mixed feelings about the character, saying: "He was a bit of a monster."

== Characteristics ==
Gareth flaunts his "team leader" status, despite his desk mate, Tim Canterbury, highlighting that it is a meaningless title simply entailing more responsibility for the same pay. Nonetheless, Gareth takes the job very seriously. His attempts to throw his inflated sense of authority around the office rarely work, and it is clear that no one pays any attention to him. He does display certain concerns for his workers, mostly regarding health and safety matters.

Tim plays numerous pranks on Gareth, such as hiding his computer, putting his stapler in jelly (a prank that was reprised in several other versions of The Office, including the American version), gluing his phone so that the receiver cannot be picked up and then calling him. Tim plays on Gareth's naïveté by discussing warfare with language which could be interpreted as being homosexual in nature, e.g. "the enemy has discovered your camp...and they've all entered your hole", "taking a man from behind" or "could you give a man a lethal blow?". In the Christmas Special, Gareth has become manager, but Tim still plays practical jokes on him by stealing his keys and then locking him in his office.

Gareth constantly displays naivety and, like Brent, can be unintentionally discriminatory. For example, Gareth attempts to disprove accusations of homophobia by mentioning that his CD collection includes George Michael, Pet Shop Boys and Queen, remarking that "they're all bummers". Queen features prominently among his favourite music. His favourite band of all time is Mike + The Mechanics, which is mentioned derisively by Tim in the bonus features of the series 2 DVD.

Wherever possible, Gareth constantly boasts about his military skills and how they might come in useful in an office environment, such as how to kill a man with a single blow. Despite his experience in the Territorial Army, he exhibits a selfish, egotistical nature and seems to be physically weak. It is quite probable Gareth inherited his love for the military life from his father, who was involved in the army some years ago.

Keenan enjoys kung-fu films, and he drives a Triumph TR3 which he bought for £1,200 and restored. The vehicle is now believed by Gareth to be worth around £3,000. Gareth is shown to have very little self-awareness, believing that his unthoughtful comments and occasional macho bravado are completely appropriate and will earn him the respect of his co-workers. His lack of self-awareness is also displayed when Tim and Dawn repeatedly insinuate homosexuality through questions about his military service without his understanding.

Despite the sturdy personality he displays, Gareth is surprisingly fragile and insecure underneath the surface. For example, when Brent announces he is leaving Wernham Hogg, Gareth breaks down in tears. Evidently, Gareth admires Brent and is eager to follow his lead. However, in the two episodes comprising the Christmas special he expresses strong disapproval of Brent's laid-back, comical approach to management.

Frequently comparing the mundane events that take place at Wernham Hogg with equivalent situations likely to occur on the battlefield, Gareth stresses the need for a shrewd, austere style of leadership. When impugning Brent's injection of comedy into the workplace, he ridiculously attempts to justify his argument by suggesting that "in a battle situation" soldiers would be more likely to be inspired by a "decisive, uncompromising leader" than one who offered them jokes before their advance towards the enemy.

Following Brent's departure, Gareth is made regional manager of the branch, although he still seems to command little respect – Tim's latest prank is to lock Gareth in his office, requiring a desperate phone call to the receptionist's desk to secure his release. Through his office window, Gareth tells Oliver that "he's locked me in again", suggesting to the audience that this is not the first time that Tim has played this prank on him.

On the social side, Gareth portrays himself as someone who can handle many pints and as somewhat of a ladies' man and does enjoy some success with women, often in the local nightclub "Chasers", but in contrast to Tim's interest in Dawn, Gareth's "success" with women is sexual in nature rather than romantic. His attempts to woo female co-workers are never successful. Generally, he is disliked in most quarters, due largely to his annoying, inappropriate behaviour and his arrogance.

He does have several close friends, some of whom include "Jimmy the Perv" (who lives up to his name by repeatedly paying Dawn for kisses for Comic Relief, with increasing lasciviousness each time), "The Oggmonster" (a very tall figure with astigmatism, played by The Office co-creator Stephen Merchant) and unseen characters known only by the nicknames "Fish Fingers" and "Gobbler". At certain points, Tim and Gareth appear to be friendly with each other. Those instances are quickly overshadowed by more practical jokes thrown at Gareth by Tim and Dawn.

== See also ==
- Dwight Schrute – Gareth's equivalent in the American version of The Office.
