= The Office (British TV series) =

British mockumentary television sitcom (2001–2003)

- Genre: Mockumentary; Workplace comedy; Comedy verite; Cringe comedy; Sitcom
- Created by: Ricky Gervais; Stephen Merchant
- Written by: Ricky Gervais; Stephen Merchant
- Directed by: Ricky Gervais; Stephen Merchant
- Starring: Ricky Gervais; Martin Freeman; Mackenzie Crook; Lucy Davis; Stirling Gallacher; Oliver Chris; Ralph Ineson; Patrick Baladi; Stacey Roca; Elizabeth Berrington
- Opening theme: "Handbags and Gladrags" performed by Big George
- Country of origin: United Kingdom
- Original language: English
- No. of series: 2
- No. of episodes: 14 (list of episodes)

Production
- Executive producers: Anil Gupta; Jon Plowman
- Producer: Ash Atalla
- Cinematography: Andy Hollis
- Editor: Nigel Williams
- Running time: approx. 30 minutes
- Production companies: Capital United Nations Entertainment; The Identity Company

Original release
- Network: BBC Two (2001–2002); BBC One (2003)
- Release: 9 July 2001 – 27 December 2003

Related
- The Office (American TV series); Le Bureau; HaMisrad; La Job; Os Aspones; Stromberg; The Office (Indian TV series); The Office (Australian TV series); La oficina (TV series)

The Office is a British mockumentary television sitcom first broadcast in the United Kingdom on BBC Two on 9 July 2001. Created, written, and directed by Ricky Gervais and Stephen Merchant, it follows the day-to-day lives of office employees in the Slough branch of the fictional Wernham Hogg paper company. Gervais also starred in the series as the central character, David Brent.

When it first aired on BBC Two, ratings were relatively low, but it has since become one of the most successful British comedy exports. As well as being aired internationally on BBC Worldwide and channels such as BBC Prime, BBC America, and BBC Canada, it has been sold to broadcasters in over 80 countries, including ABC1 in Australia, The Comedy Network in Canada, TVNZ in New Zealand, and the pan-Asian satellite channel Star World, based in Hong Kong. It was aired in the United States on BBC America from 2001 to 2016, and later on Cartoon Network's late night programming block Adult Swim from 2009 to 2011.

Two six-episode series were made, followed by a two-part Christmas special. The series addresses themes of social clumsiness, the trivialities of human behaviour, self-importance, conceit, frustration, desperation, and fame. The Office is considered to be one of the best television series of the 21st century and of all time.

== Premise ==
The series is a mockumentary based in a branch of fictional British paper company Wernham Hogg (where "life is stationery") located in the Slough Trading Estate. The branch is headed by general manager David Brent (Ricky Gervais), aided by his team leader and Assistant to the Regional Manager Gareth Keenan (Mackenzie Crook). Much of the series's comedic success stems from Brent, who frequently makes attempts to win favour with his employees and peers with embarrassing or disastrous results.

Brent's character flaws are used to comic effect, including numerous verbal gaffes, inadvertent racism and sexism, and other social faux pas. The other main plot line of the series concerns the unassuming Tim Canterbury (Martin Freeman) and his relationship with bored receptionist Dawn Tinsley (Lucy Davis). Their flirtation soon builds to a mutual romantic attraction, despite her engagement to dour and controlling warehouse worker Lee (Joel Beckett).

== Cast and characters ==
=== Main ===
- Ricky Gervais as David Brent, the general manager of the Slough branch of Wernham Hogg paper merchants. Immature and arrogant, he believes he is a lovable rogue in the business world and a Renaissance man, talented in philosophy, music and comedy. Although he thinks he is funny, caring, and respected, others perceive him as annoying, insensitive, and embarrassing. His lack of awareness regarding his ineptitude, lack of trust from colleagues, constant need of approval, and his constant shenanigans that land him in trouble are the driving plot points of the series.
- Martin Freeman as Tim Canterbury, a sales representative at Wernham Hogg. Unlike David, Tim is friendly and has a good sense of humour. His antics and charm make him one of the most likeable employees in the office, but at 30 he still lives with his parents and is unhappy with his life. During Series One and Two, he also fails to further pursue a relationship with Dawn. Chosen as David's successor at the end of Series Two, he declines and lets Gareth take the position.
- Mackenzie Crook as Gareth Keenan, Tim's vindictive desk mate and enemy. Gareth is a cold-hearted jobsworth. He takes pride in being "Team Leader", not realising his title is meaningless, and he imposes the little authority he has on his co-workers. A former member of the Territorial Army, his lack of humour makes him the target of Tim and Dawn's practical jokes. After David is fired in the Series Two finale, Gareth assumes the role of regional manager.
- Lucy Davis as Dawn Tinsley, the company's receptionist and Brent's dogsbody. She frequently has to put up with his attempts at humour and social interaction. Like her friend and co-worker Tim, she is aware of the miserable state of her life – she has been in an unhappy engagement with her fiancé Lee, a boorish warehouse worker at Wernham Hogg, and gave up illustrating children's books to continue working in this job at the same company with Lee. During the Christmas special, Dawn and Lee return from their illegally prolonged US vacation. She finally leaves Lee for Tim, after he encourages her to hold on to her dream of being a children's book illustrator, an ambition which Lee sought to put down at every opportunity.

=== Recurring ===
==== Introduced in Series 1 ====
- Stirling Gallacher as Jennifer Taylor-Clarke, previously Brent's immediate superior in Series one. At the end of series one, she is made a partner in the firm, with Neil Godwin becoming David's immediate superior in series two.
- Oliver Chris as Ricky Howard, introduced as Brent's new temp in the pilot, and a recent graduate. He was prominently featured in episode three, where he and Tim form a team for trivia night. The two end up winning, successfully answering a tie-breaker question on Shakespeare against Finch.
- Ralph Ineson as Chris "Finchy" Finch, a boorish and bullying sales representative. David describes him as his "best friend" but his attempts to impress Finch are invariably repaid with mockery and insults. In the Christmas Special, David finally stands up to Chris.
- Ewen MacIntosh as Keith Bishop: Keith works in the accounts department. Utterly indifferent to his job, Keith rarely speaks with other staff members and when he does, his comments can be cutting and sometimes disturbing.
- Joel Beckett as Lee, Dawn's fiancé who works in the company's warehouse. She met him in school and they have been together ever since. Lee is humourless, dull, and controlling. He often undermines and embarrasses Dawn, and is dismissive of her ideas of being an illustrator. His idea of a romantic proposal was a four-word notice in the newspaper — "Lee love Dawn. Marriage?" It is clear from an early stage that she stays with him out of a fear of loneliness rather than real love.
- David Schaal as Glynn, also known as Taffy, the misogynistic, sexist warehouse manager at the company and Lee's supervisor.
- Robin Hooper as Malcolm: An older staff member, he is worried about the prospect of redundancies and often challenges Brent's handling of the situation. David alternates between bothering him with heavy-handed attempts at "humour" and coldly dismissing him.
- Sally Bretton as Donna, introduced in Series 1, episode 2 as the daughter of Brent's friends Ron and Elaine, who has come to work at the office. She soon starts a relationship with Ricky.
- Nicola Cotter as Karen Roper, Brent's personal secretary. He hired her because he insists that he needs an assistant, even though the branch is facing downsizing and redundancies.

==== Introduced in Series 2 ====
- Patrick Baladi as Neil Godwin, Brent's counterpart at the Swindon branch and eventually his immediate superior. He is young, suave, handsome and hard-working, a more successful manager than Brent, and respected by his staff.
- Rachel Isaac as Trudy, first introduced in Series Two as one of several of the new intake from the Swindon branch.
- Howard Saddler as Oliver, the only black person working in the office. He is the target for David's misguided attempts to show what a politically correct and racially tolerant man he is.
- Julie Fernandez as Brenda, a wheelchair user who suffers from David's attempts to portray himself as a tolerant and progressive person.
- Stacey Roca as Rachel, Tim's new love interest.

== Episodes ==
Series	Episodes	Originally released		
Series	Episodes	First released	Last released	Network
1	6	9 July 2001	20 August 2001	BBC Two
2	6	30 September 2002	4 November 2002	BBC Two
Christmas	2	26 December 2003		BBC One
Revisited		15 March 2013		BBC One

== Production ==
In June 1998, Merchant and Gervais made Seedy Boss, a 20-minute film starring Gervais, as part of Merchant's TV producer training for the BBC. The pair met when Merchant was hired as Gervais' assistant at radio station Xfm; neither had any previous TV experience. Gervais's character was based on one he performed to amuse staff at the radio station.

Ash Atalla showed the tape to BBC Two head Jane Root, who commissioned a series based on it. Filming took place in an office at Teddington Studios.

Unlike most British sitcoms, The Office used a single-camera setup (where multiple-camera setups were traditional) and no laughter track. The style influenced subsequent comedies such as Peep Show, Twenty Twelve, Fleabag, and Motherland.

=== Music ===
The show's theme song is "Handbags and Gladrags", performed by Big George, based on the Rod Stewart arrangement, and originally written in the 1960s by Mike d'Abo, former vocalist for the rock group Manfred Mann. Gervais and Merchant also considered "Sitting" by Cat Stevens for the theme.

In Series 1, episode 4, a version of the theme performed by Gervais (in character as Brent) was featured over the end credits. The first series also features Gervais performing "Free Love Freeway", and the Christmas Special includes him performing "If You Don't Know Me By Now".

== Reception ==
=== Critical response ===
The series is considered one of the greatest British sitcoms of all time. Series one currently holds a Metacritic score of 98 out of 100, based on 12 reviews. Series two received similar acclaim, holding a Metacritic score of 93 out of 100, based on 16 reviews. The Office Christmas specials were also well received, and hold a Metacritic score of 98 out of 100, based on 19 reviews. The Office, overall, scores 97 out of 100 on Metacritic based on 47 critic reviews and is labelled a "Metacritic-Must Watch".

=== Accolades ===
At the 2001 British Comedy Awards, The Office won for Best New TV Comedy. In 2002, it won the Best TV Comedy Award, and Gervais was named the Best TV Comedy Actor.

In 2003 the series won a Peabody Award. In 2004, the series won the Golden Globe Award for Best Television Series – Musical or Comedy, the first British comedy in 25 years to be nominated for a Golden Globe, and the first ever to win one. Gervais also received the Golden Globe Award for Best Actor – Television Series Musical or Comedy.

== Legacy ==
The Office's success led to a number of localised adaptations based on its basic story and themes, produced for the television markets of other nations, creating an international The Office franchise, including the successful and Primetime Emmy Award-winning American remake on NBC starring Steve Carell as David Brent's counterpart, Michael Scott, and on which Gervais and Merchant acted as executive producers. Several direct follow-ups to the original British series were also released, including the 2016 film David Brent: Life on the Road.

The Telegraph names it one of the ten best TV sitcoms of all time. In 2013 the Writers Guild of America ranked The Office as the 51st best written series of all time, 16 slots higher than the American remake. In 2019, The Guardian ranked the series at #6 on its list of the 100 best TV shows of the 21st century. In 2022, The Rolling Stone placed the series at #53 its 'Greatest TV Shows of All Time' list. Similarly, in a 2021 poll conducted by BBC Culture, the series was ranked as the 9th greatest of all time.

== Home video releases ==
=== VHS ===
Title	Release date	Episodes	BBFC rating
The Office: The Complete Series One	14 October 2002 (BBCV 7299)	"Downsize", "Work Experience", "The Quiz", "Training", "New Girl", and "Judgement"	15
The Office: The Complete Series Two	27 October 2003 (BBCV 7437)	"Merger", "Appraisals", "Party", Motivation", "Charity", and "Interview"	15
The Office: The Christmas Specials	25 October 2004 (BBCV 7555)	Christmas Special: Part 1 and Part 2	15

=== DVD ===
DVD name	Region 1	Region 2	Region 4	Ep #	Additional information
Series One	7 October 2003	14 October 2002	1 July 2004	6	This double disc DVD set includes all six episodes from the first series. Bonus features include the featurette How I Made The Office, deleted scenes, Wernham Hogg News, Slough slang glossary, and Wernham Hogg personnel file.
Series Two	20 April 2004	20 October 2003	1 July 2025	6	This one disc DVD set includes all six episodes from the second series. Bonus features include a video diary, deleted scenes, out-takes, and a Slough slang glossary.
Christmas Special	16 November 2004	25 October 2004	7 October 2004	2	This one disc DVD set includes both hours of the Christmas Special. Bonus features include a documentary on the making of the specials, the full uncut music video of David Brent's cover of "If You Don't Know Me by Now", a featurette on the making of "Freelove Freeway", and a Golden Globes featurette.
Complete Collection	16 November 2004	22 November 2005	TBA	14	This four disc DVD set includes all 12 episodes from the first and second series, and both parts of the Christmas special. Bonus features include the How I Made The Office documentary, a documentary on the making of the specials titled The Office: Closed for Business, a commentary on the second part of the Christmas special, deleted scenes, out-takes, a video diary, the full uncut music video of David Brent's cover of "If You Don't Know Me by Now", a featurette on the making of "Freelove Freeway", and a Golden Globes featurette.
10th Anniversary Special Edition	22 November 2011	24 October 2011	14 November 2012	14	This four disc DVD set includes all 12 episodes from the first and second series, and both parts of the Christmas special. Bonus features include the How I Made The Office documentary, a documentary on the making of the specials titled The Office: Closed for Business, a commentary on the second part of the Christmas special, deleted scenes, out-takes, a video diary, the full uncut music video of David Brent's cover of "If You Don't Know Me by Now", a featurette on the making of "Freelove Freeway", and a Golden Globes featurette. Exclusive to this box set is the never-seen-before 20-minute pre-pilot, Comedy Connections featurette, broadcast wraparounds and celebrity interviews (including Hugh Jackman, Matthew Perry, Richard Curtis and Ben Stiller).

== Follow-ups ==
=== Television short ===
A Comic Relief charity short was made in 2013 entitled The Return of Brent (also known as The Office Revisited).

=== YouTube shorts ===
In 2013, Gervais developed a series of videos and released them on his YouTube channel entitled "Learn Guitar with David Brent". Within three months, the series had collected over 2 million views.

=== Film ===
The Brent character also featured in the 2016 film David Brent: Life on the Road, this time with the contributions of Gervais but not Merchant.

== Other media ==
In 2004, Microsoft UK commissioned two 20-minute corporate videos, entitled "The Office Values" and "Realising Potential", featuring David Brent being interviewed by Jeff, played by Stephen Merchant, a Microsoft employee who becomes increasingly exasperated by Brent's antics. Brent is obviously resentful of the company's success. He believes he has what it takes to become the next managing director of Microsoft and continually drops hints to that effect.

While not on general release, the videos emerged on the Internet in 2006. The clips also appeared on certain peer-to-peer networks. Microsoft was unhappy with the leak, stating that the videos "were never intended to be viewed by the public". During the first video, Brent plays the guitar, the lyrics advocating his ideas in opposition to Microsoft and technology.

David Brent has also appeared in two Season 7 episodes of The Office US. In "The Seminar", David meets Michael and asks if he has any open jobs at the moment. In "Search Committee", David sends in an online application as regional manager of Dunder-Mifflin.

== See also ==
- British sitcom
