= Ben Bailey Smith =

English actor, comedian, rapper, screenwriter (born 1977)

Doc Brown
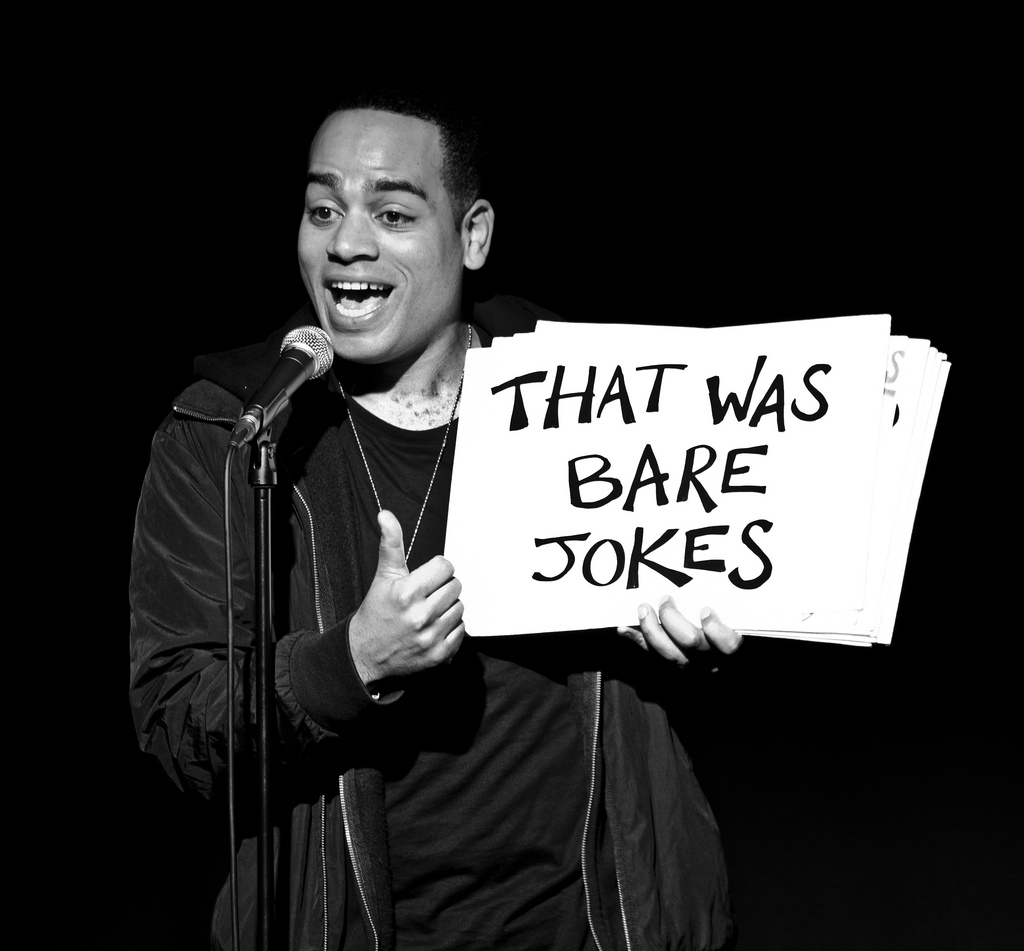
- Brown in 2011

Background information
- Born: Benjamin Harvey Bailey Smith; London, England
- Genres: Comedy; hip hop
- Occupations: Actor; comedian; rapper; screenwriter; songwriter; producer; voiceover artist
- Years active: 2000–present
- Member of: Poisonous Poets
- Website: docbrown.co.uk

Benjamin Harvey Bailey Smith, professionally known as Doc Brown, is an English actor, comedian, rapper, screenwriter, songwriter, producer, and voiceover artist. He portrayed DS Joe Hawkins in the television series Law & Order: UK. He is also known for portraying Nathan Carter in the CBBC television series 4 O'Clock Club from 2012 to 2015, and Imperial Security Bureau agent Lieutenant Supervisor Blevin in Andor. He also voiced a number of episodes of the show Funny Animals: Unleashed, aired via 4MUSIC.

== Early life and education ==
Doc Brown was born Benjamin Harvey Bailey Smith, son of a Jamaican-born British woman, Yvonne Bailey, and an Englishman, Harvey Smith, who was 30 years his wife's senior. Raised in the Willesden area of north-west London, Smith is the younger brother of novelist and essayist Zadie Smith. They also have a younger brother Luke, who performs as a professional rapper under the name Luc Skyz.

Smith attended Hampstead School. He has said that he acquired the nickname "Doc Brown" at school, after the scientist in the 1985 film Back to the Future, because he was "gangly and geeky". When he started doing rap battles as a teenager, it became his hip-hop handle.

== Career ==
=== Music ===
Doc Brown began performing as a battle rapper in 2000, appearing at the Dingwalls nightclub in Camden Lock, and later at the "Jump Off" competition in Soho. He released his debut album Citizen Smith Volume 1 in 2004. This was followed by The Document and Citizen Smith: Volume 2: Nothing to Lose, released in 2005 and 2006 respectively, before he went on a hiatus in his solo musical career.

He formed the British hip-hop group Poisonous Poets alongside rappers Lowkey, Stylah, DJ Snips, Therapist, and Tony D, releasing a mixtape in 2005.

In 2015, he released Empty Threats, his first album in a decade, this time solely based on comedy rap, a first in his discography. He returned to his original rapping style on his fifth album, Stemma, released in 2017. During this time he also collaborated with Ricky Gervais on the soundtrack to the 2016 film David Brent: Life on the Road, performing alongside Gervais as David Brent on the tracks "Lonely Cowboy", "Equality Street", "Ain't No Trouble", and on his solo track "Cards We're Dealt.”

Since then, Doc Brown has released collaboration material with Andy Burrows, The Jazz Defenders, Verb T, and Romesh Ranganathan.

=== Film and television ===
Smith appeared in the BBC series Rev and a 2009 episode of Miranda, as well as Channel 4's The Inbetweeners, and the CBBC series Big Babies. In 2013, he guest starred in the Channel 4 comedy-drama series Derek as a young man sentenced to community service in a nursing home.

He appeared in Ben Miller's film Huge, and co-starred in Other Side of the Game. He wrote music for the 2011 Joe Cornish film Attack the Block.

Smith co-created a teen comedy-drama for the BBC called 4 O'Clock Club.

He starred in the 2012 Frank Spotnitz television show Hunted, a thriller for Cinemax, and went on to shoot an episode of Midsomer Murders. In 2014, he played DS Joe Hawkins in the final series of ITV's Law & Order: UK.

In 2013, he appeared as a guest musician in The Horne Section.

In 2016, he guest-starred on the BBC One television film Damilola, Our Loved Boy as a taxi driver.

In February 2017, he appeared on Dave's Crackanory, reading "Devil's Haircut" by Sarah Morgan. That October, he was a guest on Episode 100 of The Gaffer Tapes: Fantasy Football Podcast. In late 2017, he played DS Evans in Sky One's Bounty Hunters.

In 2018, he appeared in the Doctor Who episode "The Tsuranga Conundrum".

In 2020, he played Richie Hansen, an abusive husband, in the second series of BBC TV drama The Split.

In 2022, he played Lieutenant Supervisor Blevin in five episodes of the first series of the Star Wars TV series Andor.

In 2023, he played Simon Blake in a four-part series of BBC TV drama The Sixth Commandment. His song “Smash That” featured in episode 3.

=== Radio and podcasts ===
Smith has been a guest presenter several times on the BBC Radio 5 Live film review show hosted by Simon Mayo and Mark Kermode.

He has co-hosted the podcast Shrink The Box with Nemone.

In April 2024, he appeared on the football trivia podcast Career We Go and, in October 2024, appeared on the Football Cliches podcast.

== Other work ==
Smith's children's picture book, I Am Bear, illustrated by Sav Akyüz, has been described as "a rap-style read-aloud story". It was published by Walker Books in February 2016.

== Personal life ==
Smith is a supporter of Crystal Palace. He has three daughters.

== Discography ==
Year	Title	Label
2004	Citizen Smith: Volume One	Bust-A-Gut Productions
2005	The Document	Janomi
2005	Poisonous Poetry (with Poisonous Poets)	Self-released
2006	Citizen Smith: Volume Two: Nothing to Lose	Hiptones
2008	Another Way (unreleased)	Unreleased
2015	Empty Threats	
2017	Stemma	Bust-A-Gut Productions

== Filmography ==
Year	Show	Role	Notes
2007	Never Mind the Full Stops	Panel member	Game show
2009	Miranda	Hotel Receptionist	1 episode
2010	Big Babies	Budge	13 episodes
2010	Rev	Ikon	1 episode
2010	The Inbetweeners	Drug dealer	1 episode
2011	Little Howard's Big Question	Plithy Nondeploom	1 episode
2012–2015	4 O'Clock Club	Nathan Carter	23 episodes; also creator, writer and songwriter
2012	Hunted	Tyrone	7 episodes
2013	Derek	Deon	1 episode
2013	Imagine	Himself	Credited as Ben Bailey Smith
2013–2014	Strange Hill High	Mitchell Tanner	26 episodes
2014	Midsomer Murders	Zach	Credited as Ben Bailey Smith, 1 episode
2014	Law & Order: UK	DS Joe Hawkins	Credited as Ben Bailey Smith, 8 episodes
2014	The Football's On	Himself	Guest panelist
2014	Live at the Apollo	Himself	Performer, Series 10 Episode 2
2014	Give Out Girls	Andy	6 episodes
2014	Jack and Dean	Pedestrian	Episode: "Freaky Mouth Pizza"
2014-2017	British Academy Children's Awards	Presenter	Four ceremonies
2015	Ghost Fighting Corporation	Detective Stoker	Pilot of unreleased series
2015	The John Bishop Show	Himself	Performer, 1 episode
2015-2016	Drunk History	Leonard "Nipper" Read / Bruce Ismay	Episode: S01E01 & S02E02
2016	David Brent: Life on the Road	Dom Johnson	
2016	Fleabag	Workshop Leader	1 episode
2016	Taskmaster	Himself	5 episodes
2016	Brief Encounters	Johnny	6 episodes
2016	Film 2016	Host	1 episode
2017	Bounty Hunters	DS Evans	5 episodes
2018-2020	Thunderbirds Are Go	Jensen Hunt (voice)	1 episode
2018-2020	101 Dalmatian Street	Sid Squirrel, Spencer Sausage Dog (voice)	Recurring role
2018	Doctor Who	Durkas Cicero	Episode: "The Tsuranga Conundrum"
2019	Cleaning Up	Blake	6 episodes
2019	Britannia	Rufus	3 episodes
2019	Teddles	Blocks	Episode: "Tidy Up Time"
2020	Silent Witness	Lt Col Ben Carmichael	2 episodes S23 Ep9 & 10 "The Greater Good"
2020	The Split	Richie Hansen	6 episodes
2020	Des	DC Brian Lodge	3 episodes
2021	Cinderella	Town Crier	
2022	Persuasion	Charles Musgrove	
2022	Andor	Lieutenant Supervisor Blevin	5 episodes
2023	The Sixth Commandment	Simon Blake	4 episodes
2023	Boiling Point	Darren	1 episode
2023	Significant Other	Damien	
2025	Richard Osman's House of Games	Himself	5 episodes
2025	Black Mirror	Gabe	Episode: "Bête Noire"
2025	Little Disasters	Nick	Post-production
