= Criminal Minds season 2 =

Season of television series, 2006–2007

Criminal Minds
- Season 2
- Season 2 U.S. DVD cover
- Starring: Mandy Patinkin; Thomas Gibson; Lola Glaudini; Paget Brewster; Shemar Moore; Matthew Gray Gubler; A. J. Cook; Kirsten Vangsness
- No. of episodes: 23

Release
- Original network: CBS
- Original release: September 20, 2006 – May 16, 2007

Season chronology
- ← Previous; Season 1 Next → Season 3

The second season of Criminal Minds premiered on CBS on September 20, 2006, and ended on May 16, 2007. Lola Glaudini left the show after six episodes and was replaced by Paget Brewster three episodes later while Kirsten Vangsness was promoted to the official main cast after previously being listed as also starring in season 1.

== Cast ==
=== Main ===
- Mandy Patinkin as Supervisory Special Agent Jason Gideon (BAU Senior Agent)
- Thomas Gibson as Supervisory Special Agent Aaron "Hotch" Hotchner (BAU Unit Chief)
- Lola Glaudini as Supervisory Special Agent Elle Greenaway (BAU Agent) Ep. 1–6
- Paget Brewster as Supervisory Special Agent Emily Prentiss (BAU Agent) Ep. 9–23
- Shemar Moore as Supervisory Special Agent Derek Morgan (BAU Agent)
- Matthew Gray Gubler as Supervisory Special Agent Dr. Spencer Reid (BAU Agent)
- A. J. Cook as Supervisory Special Agent Jennifer "JJ" Jareau (BAU Communications Liaison)
- Kirsten Vangsness as Special Agent Penelope Garcia (BAU Technical Analyst)

=== Special guest star ===
- Jobeth Williams as Ursula Kent
- Keith Carradine as Frank Breitkopf
- James Van Der Beek as Tobias Hankel
- Kate Jackson as Ambassador Elizabeth Prentiss

=== Recurring ===
- Meredith Monroe as Haley Hotchner
- Jane Lynch as Diana Reid
- Josh Stewart as William "Will" LaMontagne Jr.
- Jayne Atkinson as Supervisory Special Agent Erin Strauss (BAU Section Chief)
- Skipp Sudduth as Stan Gordinski

== Guest stars ==
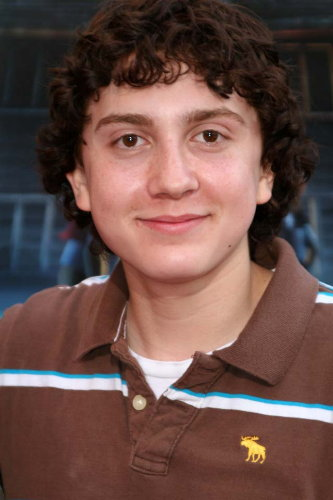
Daryl Sabara appears in the episode "P911" as Kevin Rose.

In the season premiere "The Fisher King (Part II)", Jeff Marchelletta guest-starred as Elle Greenaway's deceased father, Robert, in a dream sequence while Elle is in surgery. In the episode "P911", Mary Page Keller guest-starred as Supervisory Special Agent Katherine Cole, a former BAU Agent who is now the Unit Chief of the Crimes Against Children Unit, and is investigating a young boy who is at risk of being sold to a pedophile in an online auction. John Rubinstein guest-starred as Principal Hayden Rawlings, a pedophile and one of the bidders for the auction, despite claiming that he tried to rescue the boy from his captor. In the episode "The Perfect Storm", Nicki Aycox guest-starred as Amber Canardo, a rape victim who abducts and murders women. Her partner in crime is her husband, Tony Canardo, played by Brad Rowe.

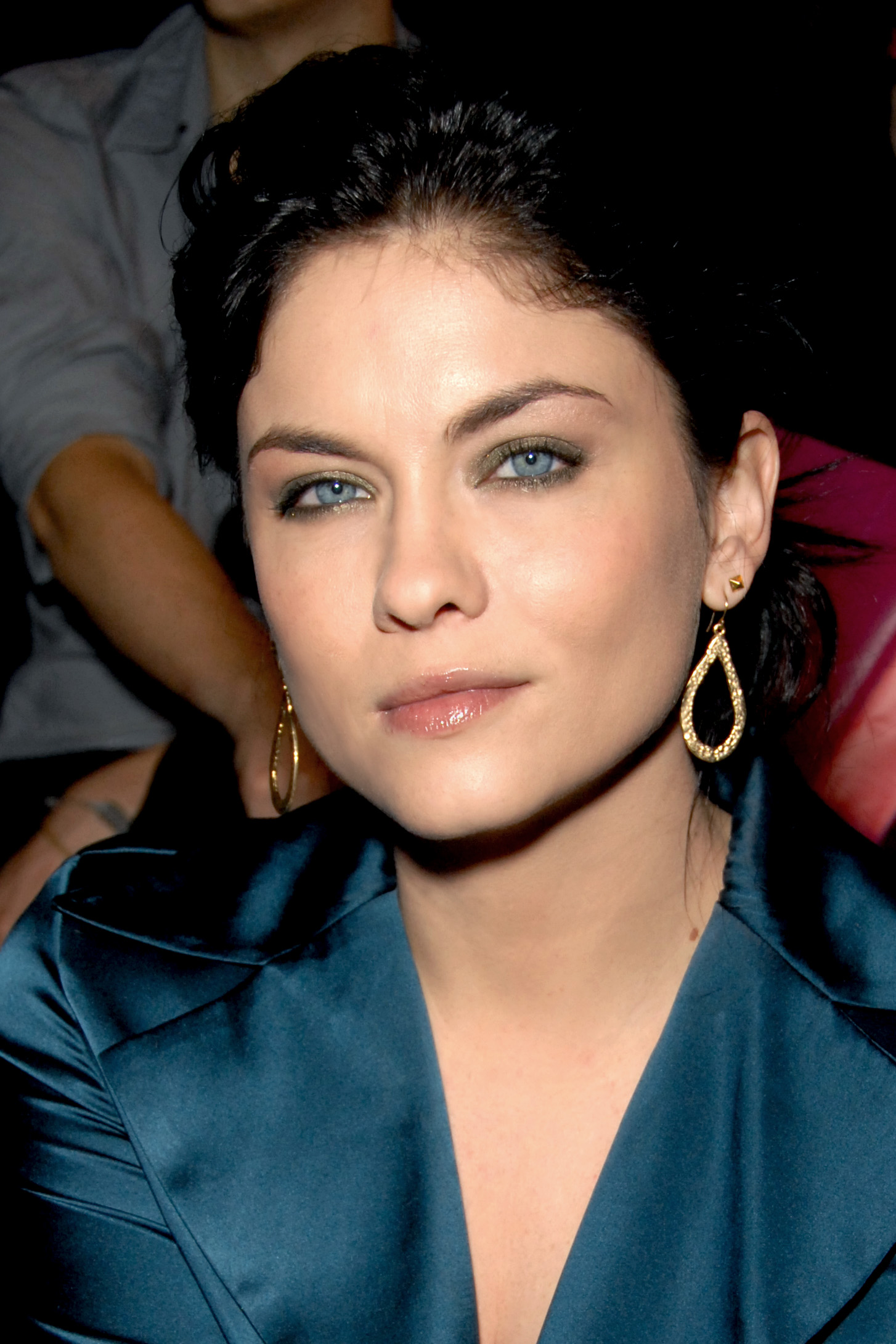
Jodi Lyn O'Keefe appears in the episode "P911" as Agent Amanda Gilroy.

In the episode "Psychodrama", Jason Wiles guest-starred as Caleb Dale Sheppard, aka "The Stripping Bandit", a meth-addicted bank robber who forces bystanders to strip naked. In the episode "Aftermath", Jason London guest-starred as William Lee, a serial rapist who impregnates his victims, and is later murdered by Elle Greenaway. Dahlia Salem guest-starred as Detective Maggie Callahan, who leads the investigation of the rapes. In the episode "The Boogeyman", Elle Fanning guest-starred as Tracy Belle, an elementary school student who is nearly murdered by child killer Jeffrey Charles, played by Cameron Monaghan. Sean Bridgers guest-starred as Jeffrey's father, James, who was the prime suspect in the murders.

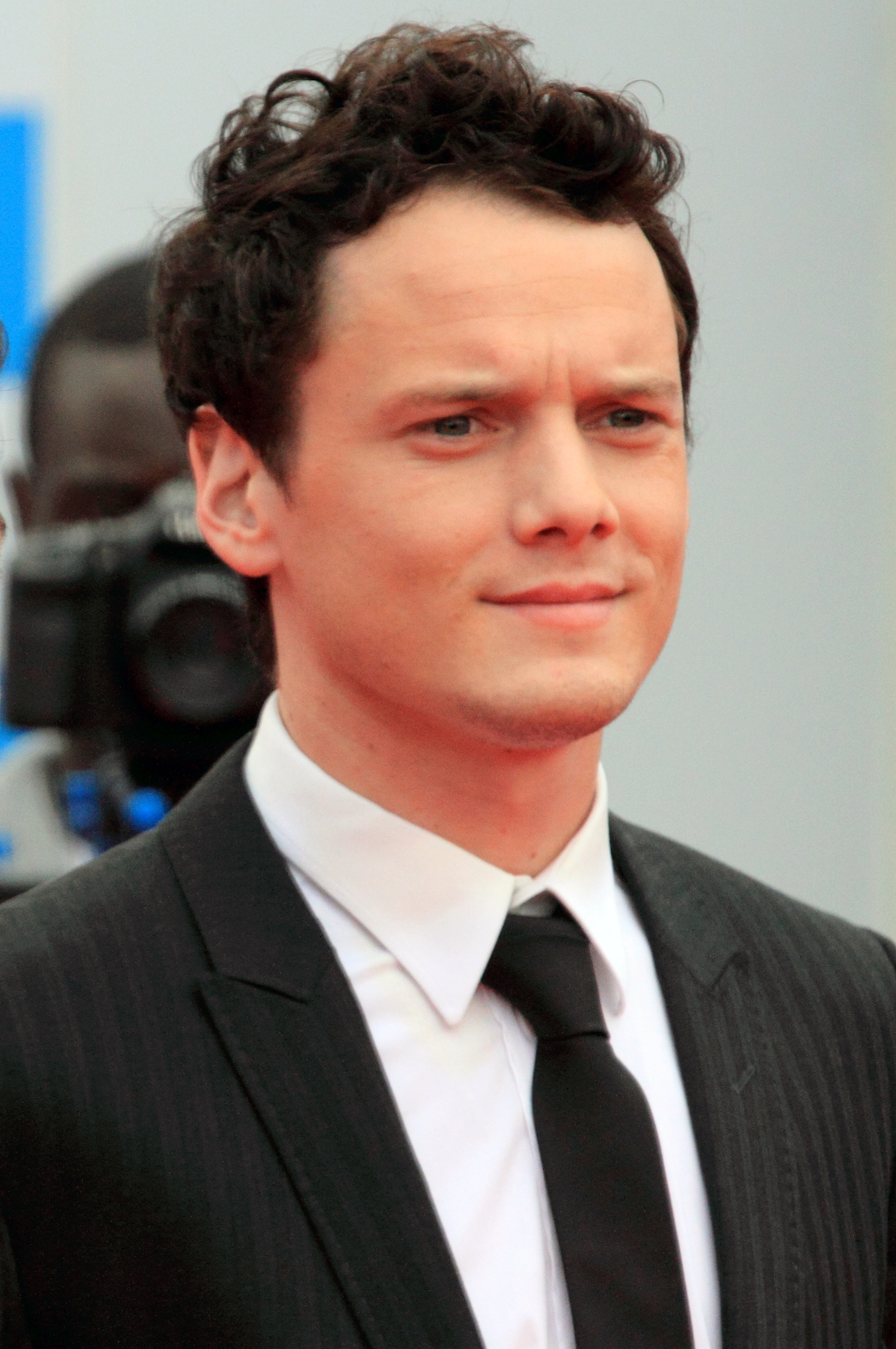
Anton Yelchin appears in the episode "Sex, Birth, Death" as Nathan Harris.

In the episode "North Mammon", Mimi Michaels guest-starred as Brooke Chambers, a soccer jock who, along with her two best friends, is abducted, and are forced to choose which one of them will be murdered. Kelly Kruger guest-starred as Kelly Seymour, the one who eventually dies. In the episode "Empty Planet", Jamie Elman guest-starred as Kenneth Roberts, a serial bomber who goes by the alias of "Allegro", the main character from his favorite science fiction novel. JoBeth Williams guest-starred as Ursula Kent, a Professor who is held hostage by Kenneth. In the episode "The Last Word", Jason O'Mara guest-starred as The Mill Creek Killer, a serial killer competing against The Hollow Man for recognition for their crimes.

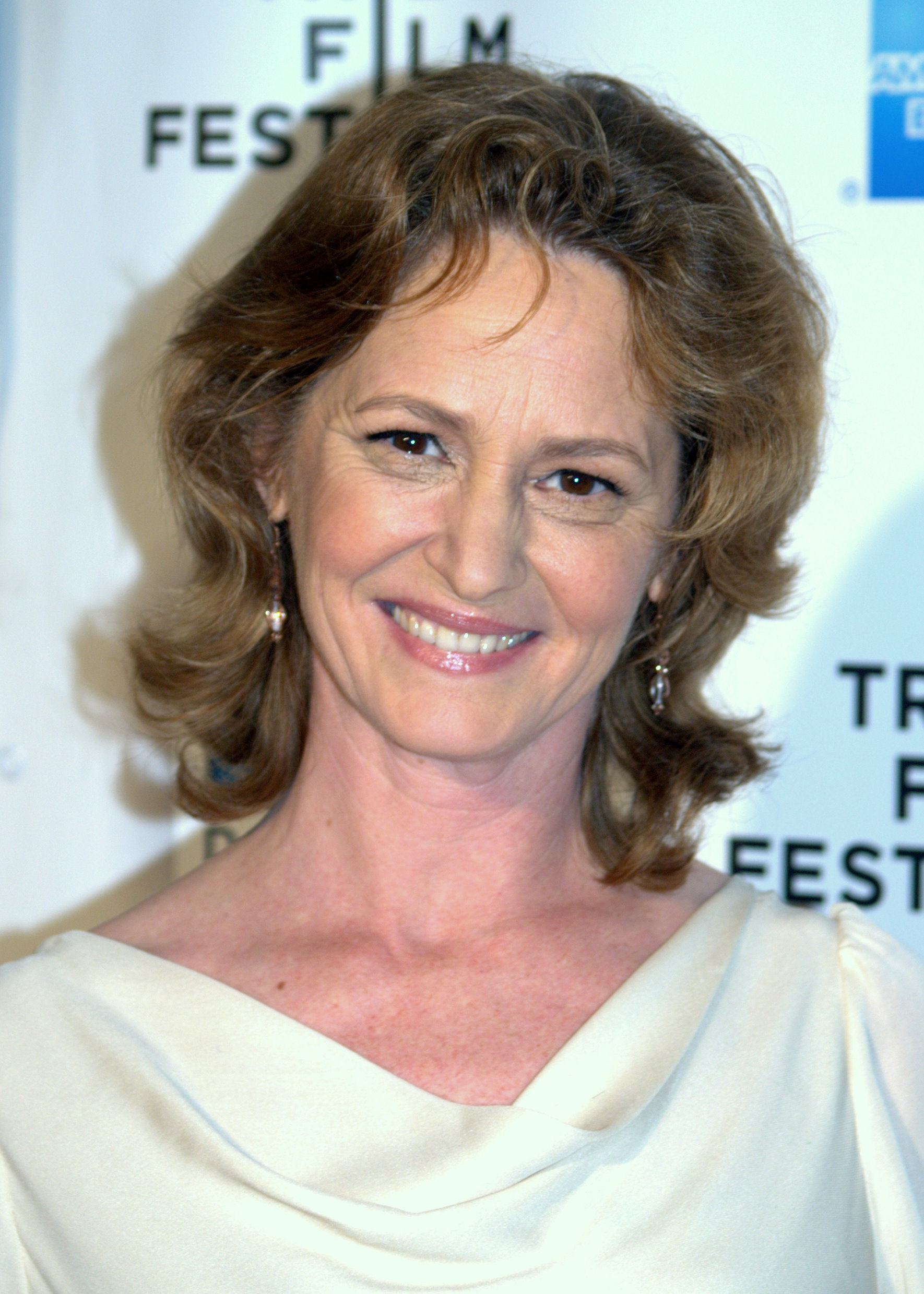
Melissa Leo appears in the episode "No Way Out" as Georgia Davis.

In the episode "Lessons Learned" Anthony Azizi guest-starred as Jamal Abaza, a Guantanamo Bay inmate who is a member of a terrorist organization called "Militant Islamic Society." Kevin Chapman guest-starred as FBI Agent Andrew Bingham, who aids the BAU in preventing an attempted bombing at a newly opened mall. In the episode "Sex, Birth, Death", Jessica Tuck guest-starred as Dr. Sarah Harris, a doctor who is desperate to help stop her son's homicidal urges and fantasies. In the episode "Profiler, Profiled", Erica Gimpel guest-starred as Sarah Morgan, Derek Morgan's elder sister.

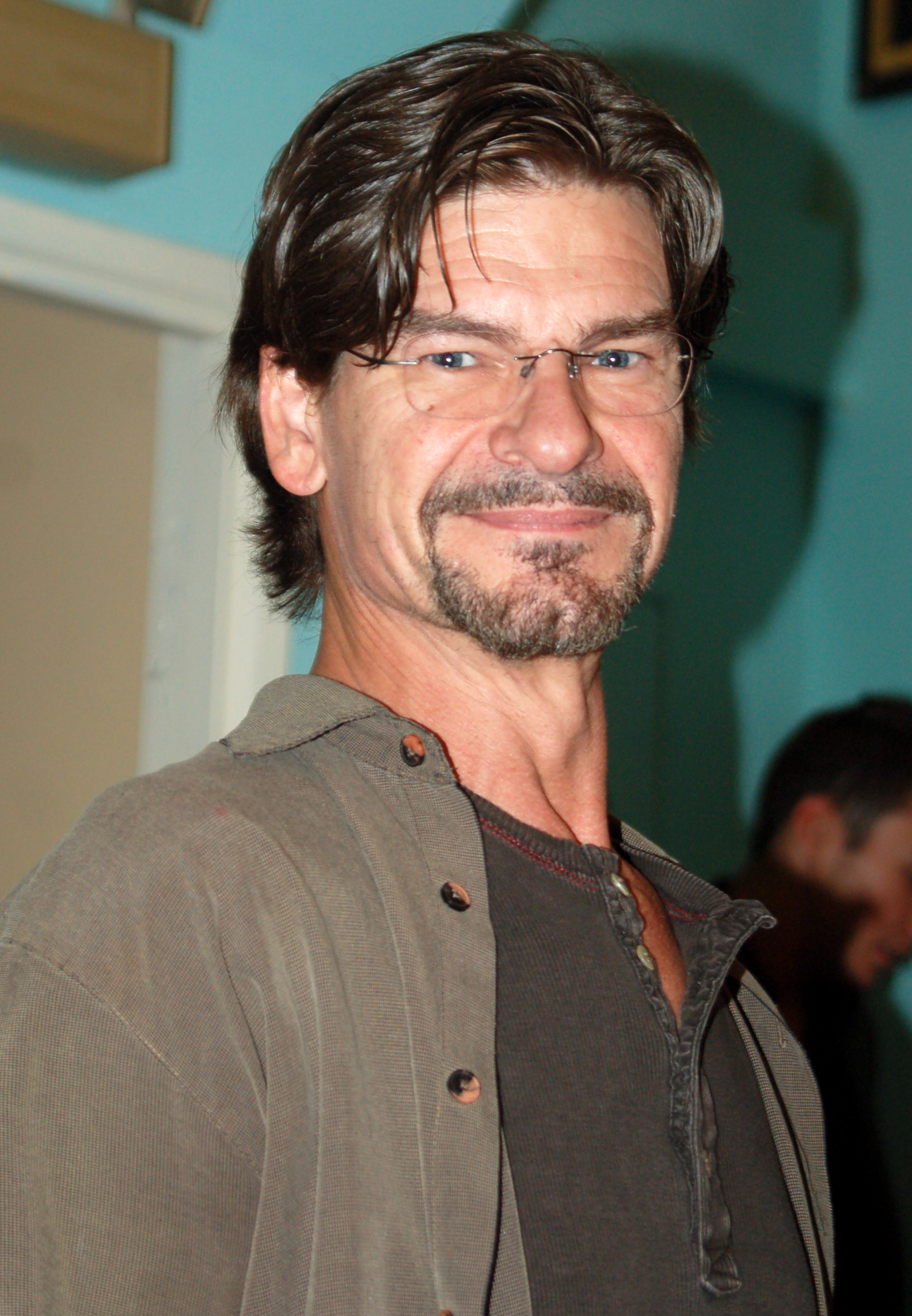
Don Swayze appears in the episodes "The Big Game" and "Revelations" as Charles Hankel.

In the episode "No Way Out", Keith Carradine guest-starred as one of the series most notorious criminals, Frank Breitkopf. Amy Madigan guest-starred as Frank's love interest, Jane Hanratty. In the episodes "The Big Game" and "Revelations", James Van Der Beek guest-starred as Tobias Hankel, a delusional serial killer who is following in the footsteps of his father Charles. Cullen Douglas guest-starred as Dr. Tony Wilson. In the episode "Distress", Holt McCallany guest-starred as Roy Woodridge, a former U.S. Army Ranger who suffers delusional visions of people who appear to him as Somali soldiers. Nick Chinlund guest-starred as Max Weston. In the episode "Jones", Simone Kessell guest-starred as Sarah Danlin, a Jack the Ripper copycat who was once helped by William LaMontagne, Jr.'s father before she became a killer.

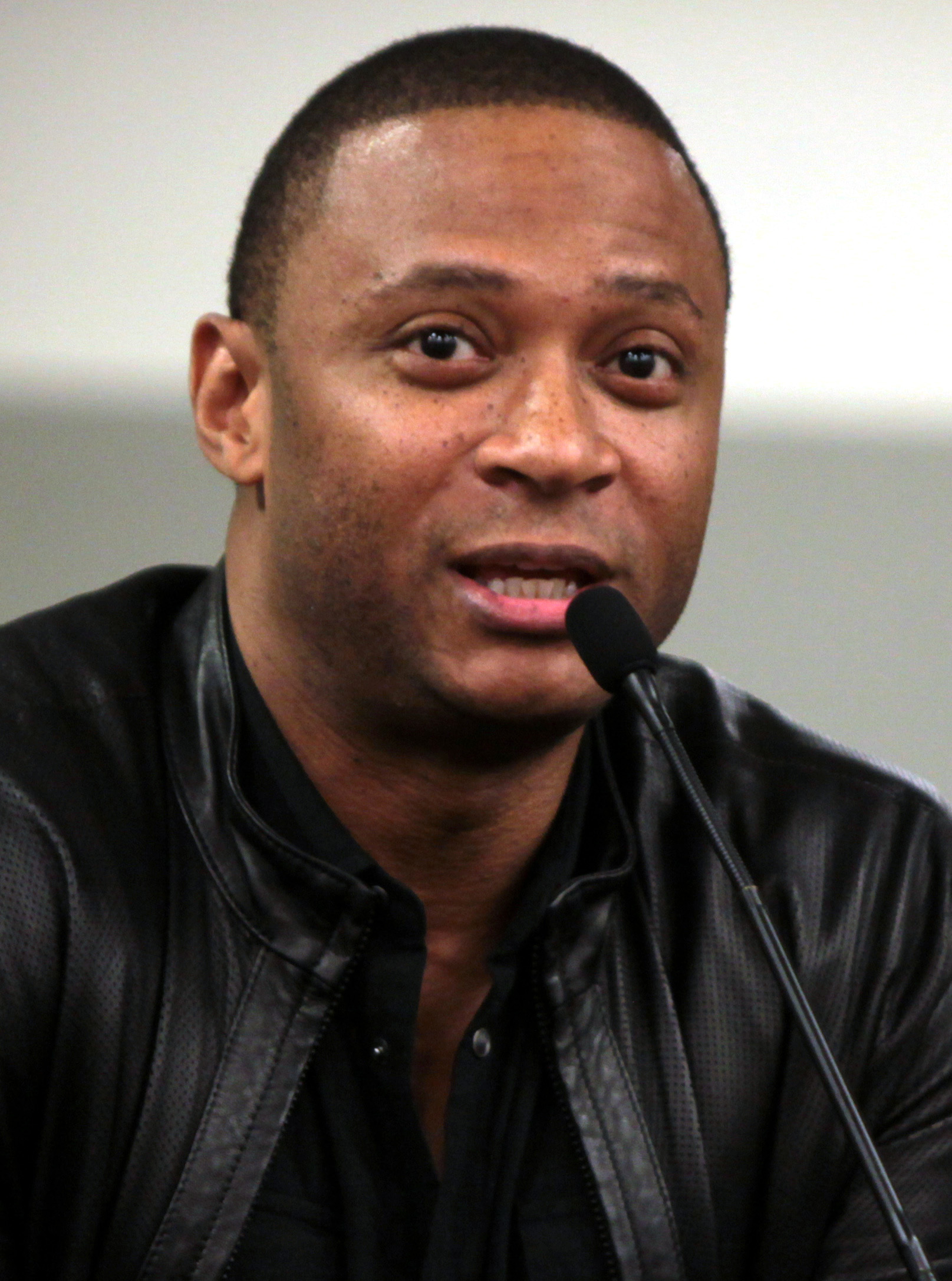
Arrow star David Ramsey appears in the episode "Fear and Loathing" as Terrence Wakeland

In the episode "Honor Among Thieves", Kate Jackson guest-starred as Emily Prentiss' mother, Elizabeth, who aids the BAU in searching for a missing Russian immigrant. In the episode "Open Season", Jim Parrack and Jake Richardson guest-starred as Paul and Johnny Mulford, a pair of brothers who kidnap and hunt several people in the woods. Laura Allen guest-starred as Bobbi Baird, a woman who is abducted and hunted by the Mulford brothers. In the season finale "No Way Out II: The Evilution of Frank", Keith Carradine and Amy Madigan reprise as Frank Breitkopf and Jane Hanratty, respectively. Elle Fanning reprises as Tracy Belle, who is abducted by Frank.

== Episodes ==
No. overall	No. in season	Title	Directed by	Written by	Original release date	Prod. code	U.S. viewers (millions)
23	1	"The Fisher King: Part 2"	Gloria Muzio	Edward Allen Bernero	September 20, 2006	201	15.65
As the BAU continues to decipher the clues left behind by psychopathic killer Randall Garner (Charles Haid), Reid uncovers a personal connection that could solve the case. Elle finds herself fighting for her life after being shot in her own home.
24	2	"P911"	Adam Davidson	Simon Mirren	September 27, 2006	203	16.54
When former profiler Katherine Cole (Mary Page Keller) and the FBI's Crimes Against Children Unit intercept live footage of an online auction involving the sale of a seven-year-old boy, whom they discovered and lost sight of the previous year, they work with the BAU to identify the seller and the boy before the auction closes. Hotch and Reid grow increasingly concerned about Elle when she returns from medical leave.
25	3	"The Perfect Storm"	Félix Alcalá	Debra J. Fisher & Erica Messer	October 4, 2006	202	15.19
When a series of murders in Jacksonville, Florida escalate to include psychological attacks on the victim's families, the BAU suspects the crimes were committed by two people working together as a team.
26	4	"Psychodrama"	Guy Norman Bee	Aaron Zelman	October 11, 2006	204	16.73
When a Los Angeles, California bank robber escalates from making his victims undress to putting their lives on the line, the BAU sets out to catch him before he strikes again. Hotch's relationship with Haley grows increasingly tense.
27	5	"The Aftermath"	Tim Matheson	Chris Mundy	October 18, 2006	205	16.20
When a Dayton, Ohio serial rapist resumes his spree following a six-week hiatus, the BAU works with local authorities to implement an elaborate strategy to catch him. Elle makes a decision that promises to send shockwaves through the team.
28	6	"The Boogeyman"	Steve Boyum	Andi Bushell	October 25, 2006	206	16.77
With Elle placed on psychological evaluation and Hotch keeping an eye on her, the remaining members of the BAU set out to Ozona, Texas to identify a serial killer responsible for the violent deaths of three young children.
29	7	"North Mammon"	Matt Earl Beesley	Andrew Wilder	November 1, 2006	207	16.97
When three teenage Pennsylvania girls are abducted on the night of a pep rally, the BAU finds themselves forced to profile an entire town. JJ struggles with personal demons and the team continues to reel from Elle's abrupt departure.
30	8	"Empty Planet"	Elodie Keene	Ed Napier	November 8, 2006	208	17.57
When a bomber targets technologically advanced institutions throughout Seattle, Washington, the BAU sets out to determine whether he is acting alone and what his ulterior motives are.
31	9	"The Last Word"	Gloria Muzio	Debra J. Fisher & Erica Messer	November 15, 2006	209	16.48
When several women are found dead in St. Louis, Missouri, the BAU searches for two serial killers who have never met but are attempting to outdo each other for media attention. Hotch grows suspicious of Emily Prentiss (Paget Brewster), a prospective new team member eager to prove that she deserves a place on the team.
32	10	"Lessons Learned"	Guy Norman Bee	Jim Clemente	November 22, 2006	210	16.56
When a DEA team discovers a chemical bomb while raiding an empty Virginia house, Gideon, Reid, and Prentiss travel to Guantanamo Bay detention camp to interrogate the leader of a sleeper cell while the remaining members of the BAU set out to prevent an attack on U.S. soil.
33	11	"Sex, Birth, Death"	Gwyneth Horder-Payton	Chris Mundy	November 29, 2006	211	17.92
When two Washington, D.C. prostitutes are found dead, Reid suspects a troubled high school student (Anton Yelchin) is responsible for the heinous crimes. Hotch enters the world of dirty politics after a political heavyweight (Mel Harris) forces him to keep the case quiet.
34	12	"Profiler, Profiled"	Glenn Kershaw	Edward Allen Bernero	December 13, 2006	212	16.06
While visiting his family in Chicago, Illinois, Morgan is labeled the prime suspect in the recent death of a young boy, as well as the deaths of two unidentified boys dating as far back as 15 years. The BAU is tasked with clearing his name and convincing a headstrong detective (Skipp Sudduth), who has had multiple run-ins with Morgan during the latter's childhood. During the case, Hotch unearths a secret that makes him question everything he thought he knew about Morgan's past.
35	13	"No Way Out"	John Gallagher	Simon Mirren	January 17, 2007	213	12.99
Investigating a series of murders in Golconda, Nevada, the BAU must find out both why a mysterious man (Keith Carradine) keeps coming back every year and where his latest victims are.
36	14	"The Big Game"	Gloria Muzio	Edward Allen Bernero	February 4, 2007	215	26.31
When a suburban Atlanta, Georgia couple is slashed to death in their home on the night of the Super Bowl, the BAU sets out to track down a religious killing team, only for one of their own to face a life-threatening situation.
37	15	"Revelations"	Guy Norman Bee	Chris Mundy	February 7, 2007	216	16.27
When multiple personality disorder-suffering serial killer Tobias Hankel (James Van Der Beek) abducts Reid, the BAU juggles rescuing their colleague and preventing Tobias from taking another life. Meanwhile, Reid finds himself flashing back to his troubled childhood.
38	16	"Fear and Loathing"	Rob Spera	Aaron Zelman	February 14, 2007	214	15.16
When three teenage African-American girls and a teenage Caucasian boy are found dead outside New York City, the BAU unearths a sinister motive. Meanwhile, Reid struggles to overcome his addiction to Dilaudid as he relives his encounter with Tobias Hankel.
39	17	"Distress"	John F. Showalter	Oanh Ly	February 21, 2007	217	13.71
When three Houston, Texas men are murdered, the BAU suspects they are dealing with a homeless man who is against gentrification. Prentiss notices a sudden change in Reid's behavior.
40	18	"Jones"	Steve Shill	Andi Bushell	February 28, 2007	218	14.50
When a New Orleans, Louisiana serial killer believed to have died in Hurricane Katrina two years earlier resumes his crime spree, the BAU works with NOPD detective William LaMontagne Jr. (Josh Stewart) to decipher the only clue they have to solve the case. Meanwhile, Reid continues to struggle with the aftermath of being taken hostage by Tobias.
41	19	"Ashes and Dust"	John Gallagher	Andrew Wilder	March 21, 2007	219	15.19
When two San Francisco, California families are burned to death while they sleep, the BAU determines both sets of victims are linked through a radical environmentalist group that uses fire to spread their message.
42	20	"Honor Among Thieves"	Jesús Treviño	Aaron Zelman	April 11, 2007	220	12.80
When a Russian immigrant is abducted from his Baltimore, Maryland home and held for a $500,000 ransom, the BAU works with Prentiss' estranged mother, Ambassador Elizabeth Prentiss (Kate Jackson), to determine the kidnapper's identity.
43	21	"Open Season"	Félix Alcalá	Debra J. Fisher & Erica Messer	May 2, 2007	222	13.28
When three people are found dead in Idaho's Boise National Forest, the BAU sets out to profile and track down a pair of brothers who hunt their victims for sport.
44	22	"Legacy"	Glenn Kershaw	Edward Allen Bernero	May 9, 2007	223	12.92
When a Kansas City, Kansas police detective contacts the BAU with information concerning a series of mysterious disappearances, the team sets out to catch a mission-oriented killer who believes he is doing the world a service by killing homeless people.
45	23	"No Way Out, Part II: The Evilution of Frank"	Edward Allen Bernero	Simon Mirren	May 16, 2007	224	13.21
When prolific serial killer Frank Breitkopf (Keith Carradine) breaks into Gideon's apartment and kills his girlfriend, the BAU finds themselves forced to profile both men as they circumvent local authorities and spearhead their own investigation. BAU Section Chief Erin Strauss (Jayne Atkinson) blackmails an agent into providing inside information on Hotch's methods.

== Home media ==
The Complete Second Season
Set details		Special features
23 episodes; 6-disc set; Aspect Ratio: 2.35:1; Subtitles: English; English: Dolby Digital 5.1		Profilers, Profiled; The Physical Evidence; Behavioral Science: Real-Life Criminal Minds; Meet Kirsten Vangsness; Gag Reel; Deleted Scenes
DVD release date
Region 1	Region 2	Region 4
October 2, 2007	May 5, 2008	April 1, 2008
