= The Football's On =

Television series

- Also known as: The Football's Not On
- Genre: Comedy
- Presented by: Ian Stone
- Starring: Doc Brown
- Country of origin: United Kingdom
- Original language: English
- No. of series: 4
- No. of episodes: 85

Original release
- Network: BT Sport
- Release: 9 May 2014 – present

The Football's On is a British television panel show broadcast on BT Sport and presented by Ian Stone with Doc Brown among others as a regular panelist.
