= An Insomniac's Nightmare =

- Directed by: Tess Nanavati
- Written by: Tess Nanavati
- Produced by: Tess Nanavati
- Starring: Dominic Monaghan; Daniel Burke; Ellen Sachs; Alex Scelso
- Cinematography: Tess Nanavati
- Music by: Robert Solberg
- Release date: 2003
- Running time: 31 mins
- Country: United States
- Language: English

An Insomniac's Nightmare is a 2003 film that stars Dominic Monaghan and was created and released by Jagged Edge Films.

Monaghan plays Jack, an insomniac in the city, fading in and out of reality through his own thoughts. He suffers many hallucinations including visions of the dead, in particular his best friend. He continually tells himself to wake up, but Jack is not asleep. He kills himself only to find that it is another hallucination, and only once morning comes do things stabilize even marginally, still creeping into insanity.
