= The Gaffer Tapes =

'The Gaffer Tapes: Fantasy Football Podcast'
- Left to Right: Hosts Ash Kernsworth, Craig Hazell and Tom Holmes. Front: Actor Dominic Monaghan in 2017
- Genre: Comedy Football Show
- Language: English

Cast and voices
- Hosted by: Tom Holmes, Craig Hazell, Ash Kernsworth

Production
- Production: Ash Kernsworth
- Length: Variable (60–100 minutes)

Technical specifications
- Audio format: Podcast (via streaming or download)

Publication
- No. of seasons: 5
- No. of episodes: 139
- Original release: June 2014 – December 2018
- Updates: Season one: 2014/15; Season two: 2015/16; Season three: 2016/17; Season four: 2017/18; Season five: 2018

Reception
- Cited for: 2016 Football Content Award

Related
- Website: Audioboom

The Gaffer Tapes are a comedy fantasy football brand, group of authors and a podcast.

== History of The Gaffer Tapes ==
In 2014 Fantasy Football expert Ash Kernsworth, writer and broadcaster Craig Hazell, and comedian Tom Holmes began recording podcasts during the 2014 FIFA World Cup. In August of the same year, they accompanied the mini-league on the official Premier League fantasy football website. While the content of the podcast consisted of general fantasy football discussion, specifics such as prices of players and league positions were specific to the Fantasy Premier League game.

In July 2017, The Gaffer Tapes appeared on former Everton goalkeeper Asmir Begović's Season of Sports podcast to talk Fantasy Sports.

On 3 July 2017, The Gaffer Tapes announced that they were recording a live podcast at The Phoenix Artist Club in Central London which was recorded on 24 October 2017.

On 31 July 2017 Craig appeared as a guest on Talksport radio to talk about Fantasy Football. On 7 December 2017, Ash also appeared as a guest. Craig appeared again in August 2019 to talk about the release of 'The A-Z of Fantasy Football'.

In May 2018 The Gaffer Tapes released a song for the England national team's 2018 FIFA World Cup campaign.

Tom and Craig wrote for the television show 'Football's 47 Best Worst Songs' in 2018, which was produced by Goalhanger Films and broadcast on UKTV Play, hosted by Bob Mortimer.

The Gaffers were asked to be Judges for the Professional Footballers' Association 'Player of the Month' award for September 2018.

On 5 March 2019 The Gaffers announced that they had stopped recording podcasts. In total there were 139 episodes recorded between June 2014 and December 2018.

Tom appeared on the Hawksbee and Jacobs Show on talkSPORT on 12 December 2019, to talk about chess grandmaster Magnus Carlsen and his rise to prominence in fantasy football.

In July 2021 Tom was interviewed in FourFourTwo Magazine about Fantasy Football.

In November 2021 Tom did an interview with British Comedy Guide where it was announced that The Gaffer Tapes "should return from hiatus soon".

In June 2025 Tom and Craig's script "Baeliffs" came runner-up in the Sitcom Mission 2025, in association with British Comedy Guide, in September 2025 it was longlisted in the Shortcom TV Sitcom Competition 2025, and in May 2026 it was longlisted in the David Nobbs Memorial Trust New Comedy Writing Competition, before being shortlisted in June 2026.

== Award ==
The Gaffer Tapes were nominated as 'Best Football Podcast' at the Football Blogging Awards (now called the Football Content Awards) in both 2015 and 2016, winning the Judge's Award at the 2016 event, held at Old Trafford.

== The A–Z of Fantasy Football ==
It was announced in October 2018 that The Gaffers had signed a book deal with Pitch Publishing for a Comedy Fantasy Football book. The book was released on 1 July 2019. The book is a guide to fantasy football, with anecdotes and advice. It features conversations with Dominic Monaghan, Helen Chamberlain, and Asmir Begović amongst others. The foreword is written by comedian Joel Dommett.

== Guests and Listeners to the Podcast ==
Actor Dominic Monaghan was a listener of the podcast and has appeared as a guest in both April and November 2016 and May 2018, as well as submitting several audio questions which were played on the podcast. While appearing as a guest, Monaghan stated:

It’s the best fantasy football podcast out there.

Other notable listeners include comedian and actor Tom Davis.

In April 2017, television comedian Dane Baptiste appeared as a guest.

In early October 2017, comedian, impressionist, and star of Murder in Successville Luke Kempner appeared as a guest.

On 18 October 2017, The Gaffer Tapes released their 100th podcast, with actor, comedian, and rapper Doc Brown appearing as a guest.

== Regular Features on The Gaffer Tapes Podcast ==
- The Gaffer Gambler

Hazell offered tips and odds on betting opportunities. This feature was brought back sporadically, with odds being provided by The Odds Bible.

– Tweets for my Tweet

The hosts read out tweets that were sent to them during the week. The title of the feature was sung by the hosts to the tune of Sweets for My Sweet by The Drifters.

– Mental Email of the Week

The hosts began receiving emails that were often not related to football content whatsoever.

– Where's Wallerz?

A weekly update on the social media whereabouts of former Leicester City footballer Marcin Wasilewski, who is referred to as "Wallerz".

– Tom's Lee Sharpe Anecdote

On the final podcast of every season, Holmes told an anecdote about when he met former professional footballer Lee Sharpe at Elland Road as a child.

– The Diary of Little Timmy Tinker

From the beginning of the 2018–19 season until the final podcast in December 2018, Holmes began reading excerpts from the fictional diary of a nine-year-old footballer called Timmy Tinker.

– Any Other Business

The hosts read out social media interactions that usually consisted of listeners pointing out incorrect statements and facts that appeared in the previous week's show.

– The Weekly Quiz

Every season, one of the hosts acted as Quiz Master and the remaining two competed in weekly quizzes with the loser being given a forfeit at the end of the season. In the inaugural 2014–15 season, Hazell hosted the quiz and Kernsworth defeated Holmes. In 2015–16 Kernsworth hosted the quiz and Hazell defeated Holmes. In 2016–17 Holmes hosted the quiz and Hazell defeated Kernsworth. In 2017–18 Hazell hosted the quiz again and Holmes defeated Kernsworth. In 2018–19 Kernsworth hosted the quiz again and Holmes took on Hazell with no winner being determined before the podcast finished.
