= David Brent: Life on the Road =

2016 British comedy film by Ricky Gervais

- Directed by: Ricky Gervais
- Written by: Ricky Gervais
- Produced by: Ricky Gervais; Charlie Hanson
- Starring: Ricky Gervais; Ben Bailey Smith
- Cinematography: Remi Adefarasin
- Edited by: Gary Dollner
- Production companies: Entertainment One; BBC Films
- Distributed by: Entertainment One (United Kingdom, Ireland, Australia and New Zealand); Netflix (International)
- Release date: 19 August 2016 (United Kingdom)
- Running time: 96 minutes
- Country: United Kingdom
- Language: English
- Box office: $5.2 million

David Brent: Life on the Road (titled on-screen simply as Life on the Road) is a 2016 British mockumentary comedy film written, directed, and produced by Ricky Gervais and released by Entertainment One. The film stars Gervais as David Brent, a character he played in the BBC television comedy series The Office, who has a film crew that shadows him as he travels up and down the country living his dream of being a rock star. Gervais said, "This film delves much more into his private life than The Office ever did and we really get to peel back the layers of this extraordinary, ordinary man." He has emphasised that it is "not an Office film".

The film was released on 19 August 2016 in the UK by Entertainment One to mixed reviews and was a box-office bomb.

== Plot ==
Fifteen years after his appearance in the BBC2 "documentary" series The Office, David Brent is a sales rep for bathroom supply firm Lavichem. His colleagues include his nemesis, Jezza, who cannot stand Brent or his jokes; however, he gets a more sympathetic response from colleague Pauline and receptionist Karen, and shares a sense of humour with fellow sales rep Nigel.

Desperate to resume his music career and sign a record deal, Brent takes a month of unpaid leave and uses money from his pension to pay his fellow band members (Foregone Conclusion), his rapper friend Dom, Dan the sound engineer (to whom he boldly offers double what he earns at the studio), a PR consultant, and many other costs, to arrange a tour of venues around Berkshire.

As the tour wears on, the band and crew refuse to socialise with Brent (unless he pays them to do so), and even make him drive behind the tour bus claiming there is no room for him. When Brent finally manages to convince a record company rep to attend a show, they are more interested in Dom's rapping than Brent's music. As the costs of the tour spiral out of control, sound engineer Dan comforts a dejected Brent, informing him that he does not need to pay people to like him, and to stop wasting his pension money. The band play one final show, and then genuinely join Brent for a drink.

Brent returns to Lavichem to the delight of Pauline, Karen and Nigel, while Dom achieves a solo record deal and the rest of the band join up with Peter Andre. Pauline asks him to take her out for a coffee and she takes his hand as they head out.

== David Brent's characterisation ==
Having lost much of his status since The Office, David Brent is now the victim of workplace bullying from colleagues and unlike in The Office where Brent largely enjoys his working life and the status it gives him, he is openly unhappy in his job. However, as Henry Barnes writes, "All of this relies on the audience liking, or even loving, David Brent as much as they once did, on giving him as many chances as Gervais has."

== Cast ==
- Ricky Gervais as David Brent
- Ben Bailey Smith as Dom Johnson, Brent's bandmate. Smith sang with Gervais on his music tours and in 2013, they both wrote and performed a spoof reggae song, "Equality Street", for the charity Comic Relief.
- Tom Basden as Dan Harvey, the sound engineer
- Jo Hartley as Pauline, Brent's sympathetic colleague at Lavichem
- Tom Bennett as Nigel
- Andrew Brooke as Jezza, Brent's nemesis at Lavichem
- Mandeep Dhillon as Karen Parashar, Lavichem receptionist
- Miles Chapman as Andy Chapman
- Abbie Murphy as Serena Wilson
- Rebecca Gethings as Miriam, Lavichem's HR Manager
- Nina Sosanya as Brent's therapist
- Diane Morgan as Briony Jones, PR
- Kevin Bishop as DJ at Tadley FM

Andy Burrows, Stuart Wilkinson, Steve Clarke, and Michael Clarke portray the band Foregone Conclusion, while Peter Andre appears as himself.

== Music ==
Gervais announced that he would release the film's soundtrack album under Brent's recording label Juxtaposition Records. He finished writing the songs for the film in November 2014.

Chris Martin of Coldplay, who guest starred in Extras with Gervais, recorded music for the soundtrack together with him. Andy Burrows plays the drummer for Foregone Conclusion, and wrote some original songs with Gervais. They both have written several original songs for the film, including "Please Don't Make Fun of the Disableds" and "Native American".

On 20 October 2015, Gervais published an exclusive photo of Brent on the set of his music video shoot for his song "Lady Gypsy". The soundtrack album was released together with the film.

In May 2016, Gervais announced that Brent would be releasing a single in July ahead of the film release, and on 8 July 2016, Gervais released Brent's single "Lady Gypsy". The David Brent Songbook was released by Blink Publishing on 11 August 2016 eight days before the premiere of Life on the Road. Included are introductions by the character, exclusive images and the tracks arranged for piano, voice and guitar. Gervais said: "This book is a dream come true for Brent...Even though this is clearly a humour book, the sheet music is real and the songs are insanely catchy and easy to play. Go and get the guitar." Gervais revealed that the album has 15 tracks, with the vinyl edition containing 2 LPs.

=== Soundtrack ===
1. "Ooh La La"
2. "Native American"
3. "Lonely Cowboy"
4. "Free Love Freeway"
5. "Life on the Road"
6. "Slough"
7. "Thank Fuck It's Friday"
8. "Lady Gypsy"
9. "Please Don't Make Fun of the Disableds"
10. "Paris Nights"
11. "Don't Cry It's Christmas"
12. "Spaceman"
13. "Equality Street"
14. "Ain't No Trouble"
15. "Electricity"

==== Charts ====
Chart (2016)	Peak position
Australian Albums (ARIA)	31
Belgian Albums (Ultratop Flanders)	103
Irish Albums (IRMA)	21
UK Albums (Official Charts)	3

== Production ==
The film was first revealed in August 2013. Gervais said that he was excited to show the world what David Brent is up to now. Stephen Merchant, co-creator of The Office, was not involved in the film's production.

Principal photography began in November 2015, with Gervais directing as well as starring. Filming ran through 18 December 2015, and was shot in locations in London and Slough.

== Release ==
Entertainment One and BBC Films co-financed the film. Entertainment One distributed the film in the UK, Australia and New Zealand. Open Road Films was set to distribute the film in the United States; however, Netflix later acquired distribution rights to the film in all territories excluding the UK, Ireland, Australia and New Zealand.

On 15 March 2016 Gervais released the first posters of the film, both featuring Gervais as Brent. The film received its first official release on 19 August 2016 in the United Kingdom. On 7 April 2016, Gervais released the first teaser trailer of the movie. It showed Brent in his office interacting with his co-workers.

== Reception ==
David Brent: Life on the Road grossed $5.2 million worldwide, against a $10 million budget. The film holds a Rotten Tomatoes score of 58% based on 79 reviews, with an average rating of 6.1/10. The site's critics consensus reads, "David Brent: Life on the Road has its moments, but this further exploration of an established character suffers in comparison to what came before." Metacritic, which uses a weighted average, assigned the film a score of 54 out of 100, based on 12 critics, indicating "mixed or average" reviews.
