= Free Love Freeway =

Song written by Ricky Gervais

"Freelove Freeway" is a song written by Ricky Gervais who starred in the British comedy series The Office. Gervais first performed the song as David Brent in Series 1, Episode 4 (titled Training) of the show. From 2018, "Freelove Freeway" also appears in Freeview adverts in the United Kingdom.

== Versions ==
The first version of "Freelove Freeway" was played by Brent during an employee training seminar. He went home to get his guitar and entertained his employees with his original songs he used to sing with his rock band Foregone Conclusion.

In 2004, singer-songwriter and musician Noel Gallagher, whilst still in Oasis, recorded the song with Gervais. The full band recording, which has an added verse, was available as a special feature on the DVD of The Office Christmas Specials. A longer, one-take version of the song was also available as an easter egg on the series one DVD.

Gervais and Mackenzie Crook (as Gareth Keenan) performed the song at the Concert for Diana at Wembley Stadium in 2007.

In January 2009, Gervais was a guest on BravoTV Inside the Actors Studio season 15 with James Lipton, where at one point of the interview he answered Lipton's question as David Brent. Then Brent obliged the audience by singing his latest song "Freelove Freeway" with a guitar supplied to him by Lipton.

In 2013, Gervais brought back his famous character Brent on his YouTube channel in a web series, "Learn Guitar with David Brent". He plays guitar, gives some tips on how to play and answers fan questions. Among the songs he played are "Freelove Freeway", "Spaceman Came Down", "Ooh, La La" and "Life on the Road".

Gervais recorded another version of the song as David Brent for the 2016 film David Brent: Life on the Road. It was released on the film's soundtrack along with 14 other original songs.
