= Criminal Minds season 3 =

Season of television series Criminal Minds

Criminal Minds
- Season 3
- Season 3 U.S. DVD cover
- Starring: Mandy Patinkin; Joe Mantegna; Paget Brewster; Shemar Moore; Matthew Gray Gubler; A. J. Cook; Kirsten Vangsness; Thomas Gibson
- No. of episodes: 20

Release
- Original network: CBS
- Original release: September 26, 2007 – May 21, 2008

Season chronology
- ← Previous; Season 2 Next → Season 4

The third season of Criminal Minds premiered on CBS on September 26, 2007 and ended May 21, 2008. The third season was originally to have featured 25 episodes; however, only 13 were completed before the Writers Guild of America strike (2007–08). Seven more episodes were produced after the strike, bringing the total number of episodes to 20 for the third season. Mandy Patinkin wanted to leave the series, since he loathed the violent nature of it. He was replaced by Joe Mantegna several episodes later.

== Cast ==
=== Main ===
- Mandy Patinkin as Supervisory Special Agent Jason Gideon (BAU Senior Agent) Ep. 1–2
- Joe Mantegna as Supervisory Special Agent David Rossi (BAU Senior Agent) Ep. 6–20
- Paget Brewster as Supervisory Special Agent Emily Prentiss (BAU Agent)
- Shemar Moore as Supervisory Special Agent Derek Morgan (BAU Agent)
- Matthew Gray Gubler as Supervisory Special Agent Dr. Spencer Reid (BAU Agent)
- A. J. Cook as Supervisory Special Agent Jennifer "JJ" Jareau (BAU Communications Liaison)
- Kirsten Vangsness as Special Agent Penelope Garcia (BAU Technical Analyst)
- Thomas Gibson as Supervisory Special Agent Aaron "Hotch" Hotchner (BAU Unit Chief)

=== Special guest stars ===
- Frankie Muniz as Jonny McHale
- Fredric Lehne as Jack Vaughan
- Haley Pullos as Merecdes Gibbons

=== Recurring ===
- Jayne Atkinson as Supervisory Special Agent Erin Strauss (BAU Section Chief)
- Nicholas Brendon as Kevin Lynch
- Meredith Monroe as Haley Hotchner
- Cade Owens as Jack Hotchner
- Josh Stewart as William "Will" LaMontagne Jr.

== Guest stars ==
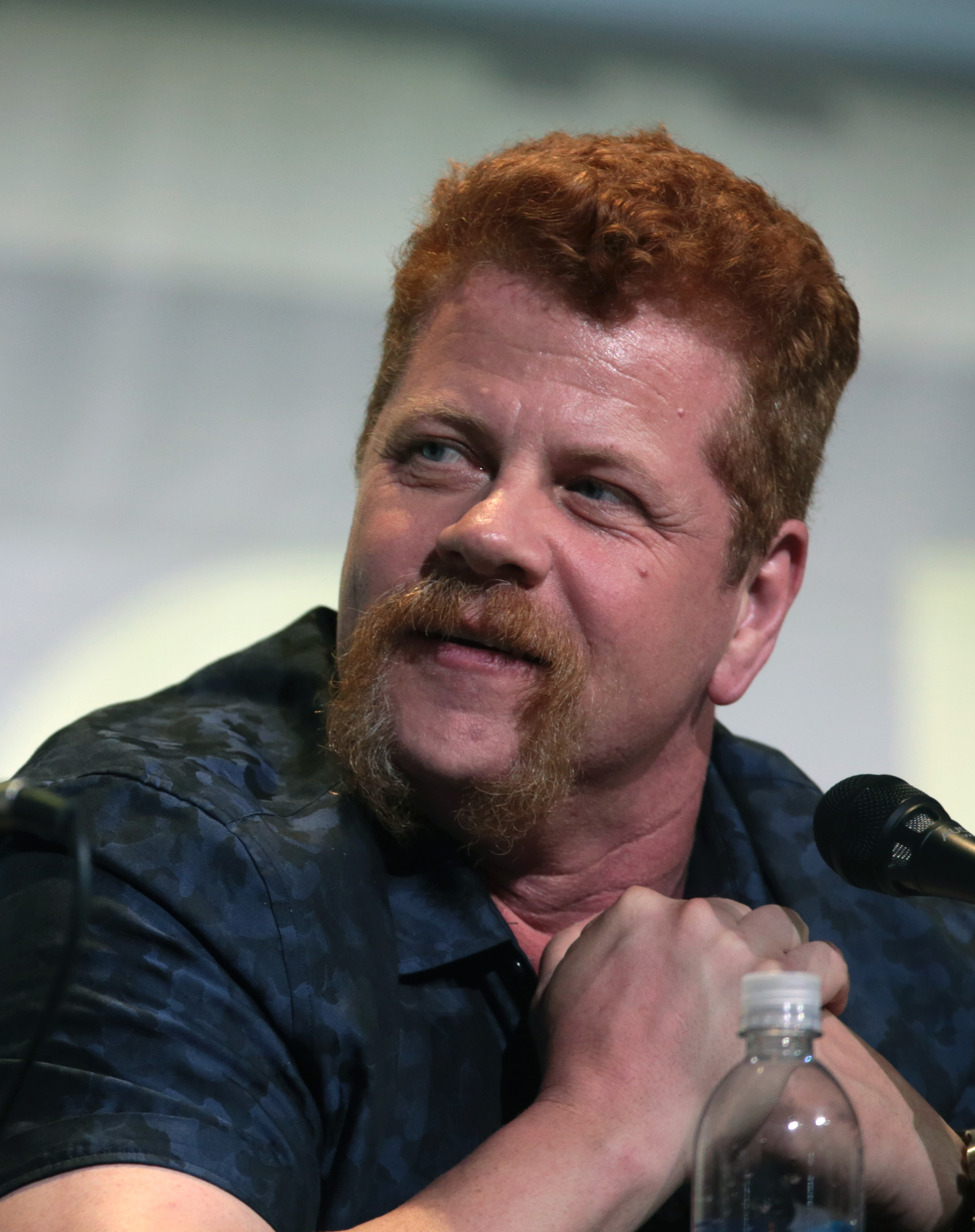
The Walking Dead star Michael Cudlitz appears in the episode "Identity" as Francis Goehring.

In the season premiere "Doubt", Shelly Cole guest-starred as Anna Begley, a suicidal college student who copied the crimes of Nathan Tubbs, aka "The Campus Killer". Alexa Alemanni guest-starred as Amy Deckerman, Anna Begley's first murder victim. In the episode "In Name and Blood", Eddie Cibrian guest-starred as Joe Smith, a serial killer who uses his son to lure women and murder them. Gordon Clapp guest-starred as Detective Victor Wolynski, who leads the investigation of the murders. In the episode "Scared to Death", Michael O'Keefe guest-starred as Dr. Stanley Howard, a psychiatrist who uses his patients' worst fears to murder them.

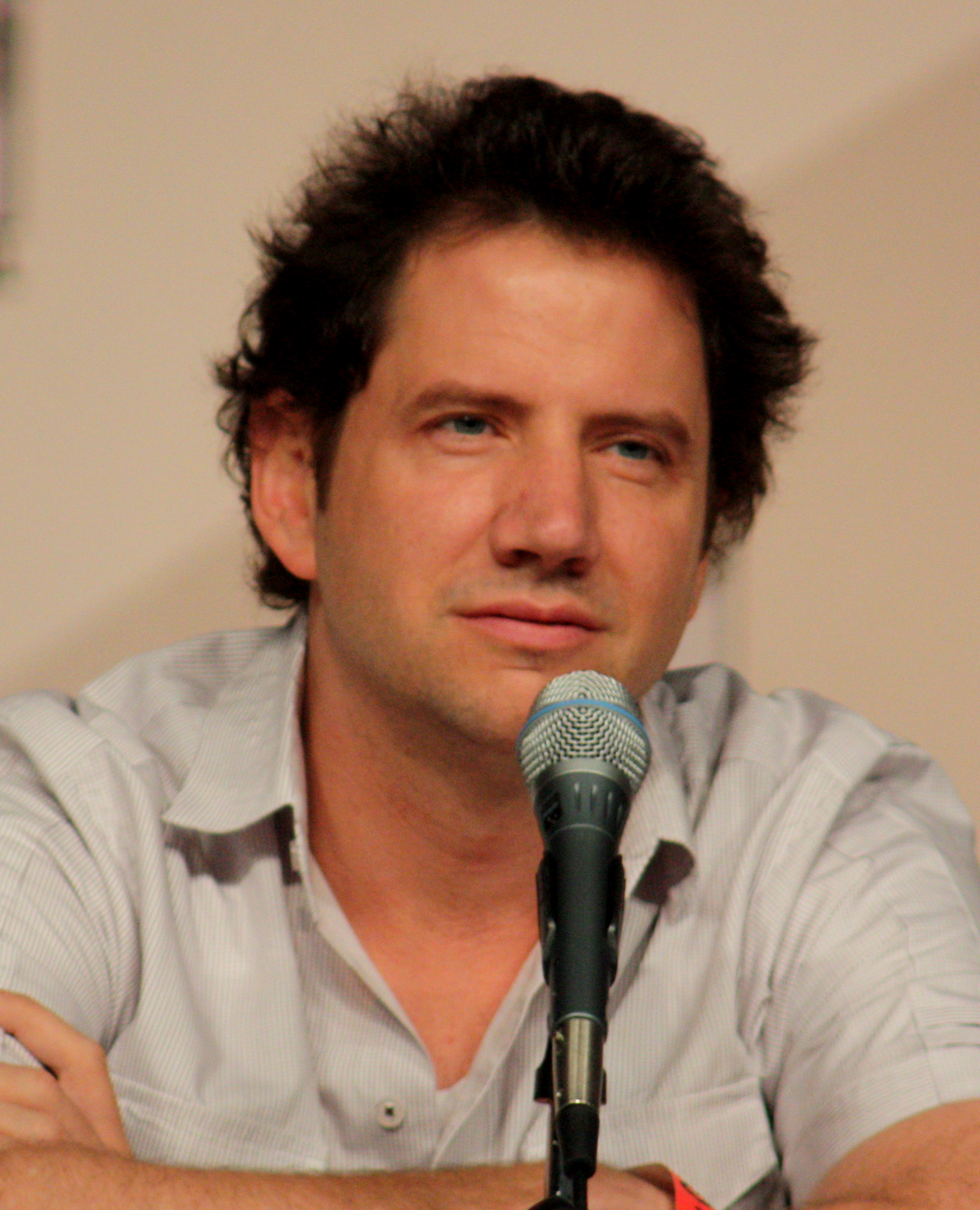
Jamie Kennedy appears in the episode "Lucky" as Floyd Feylinn Ferrell.

In the episode "Children of the Dark", Francis Capra guest-starred as Ervin Robles, a serial killer who was abused by a strict foster family. William Lee Scott guest-starred as Robles' foster brother and accomplice Gary, and Christine Healy guest-starred as Mrs. Manwaring, an abusive foster mother. In the episode "Seven Seconds", Ariel Winter guest-starred as Katie Jacobs, a young girl who is kidnapped at a shopping mall. Suzanne Cryer guest-starred as Susan Jacobs, Katie Jacobs' aunt who might be involved in her disappearance. Paula Malcomson guest-starred as Katie's mother, Beth, and Alexander Gould guest-starred as Susan's son, Jeremy.

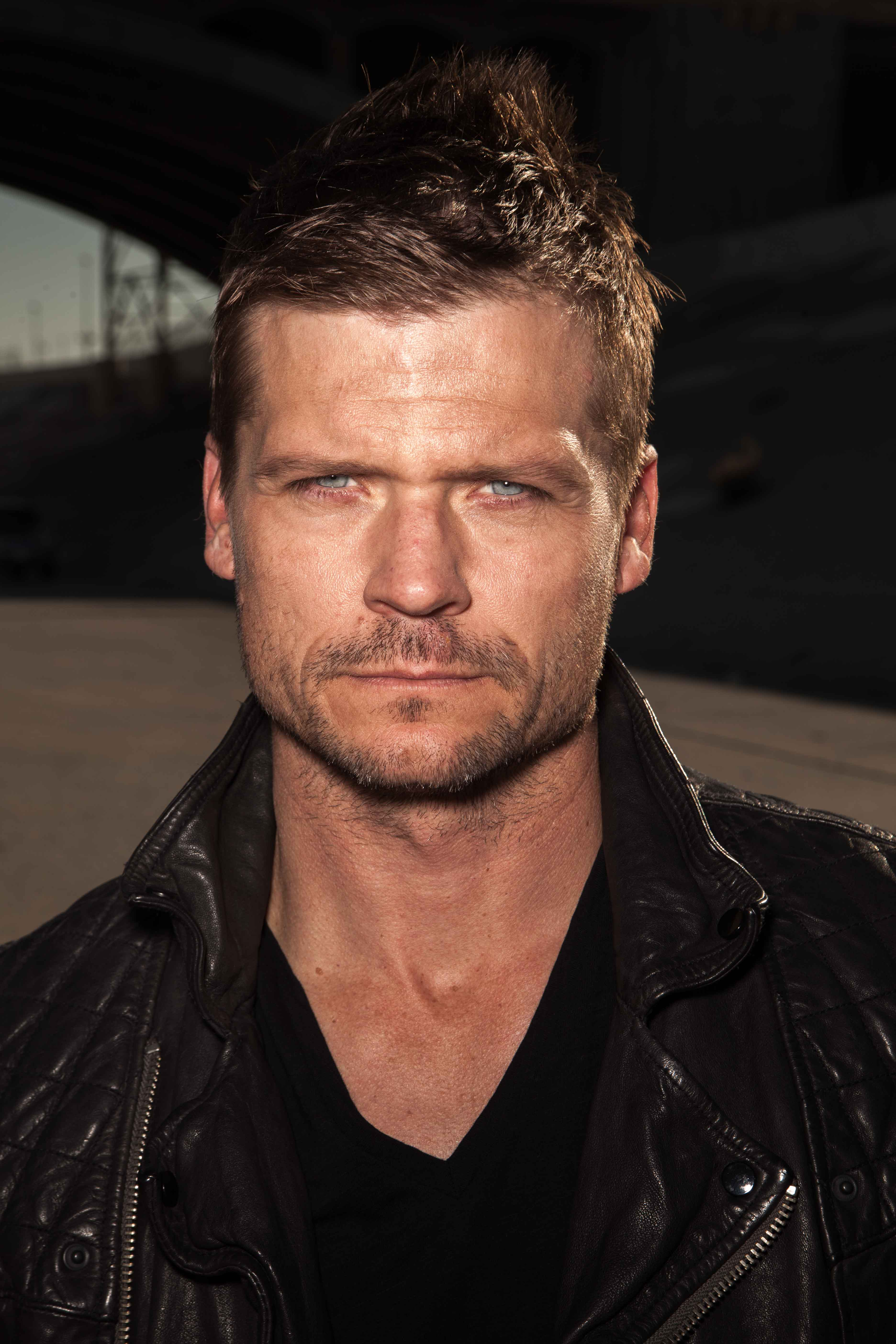
Bailey Chase appears in the episodes "Lucky" and "Penelope" as Jason Clark Battle.

In the episode "About Face", Andrew Kavovit guest-starred as Max Poole, aka "The Have You Seen Me Murderer". Michael O'Neill guest-starred as Detective Frank Yarborough, who investigates the murder of his wife's friend. In the episode "Identity", Kaj-Erik Eriksen guest-starred as Henry Frost, a serial killer who assumed the identity of his partner in crime and idol, Francis Goehring, who committed suicide. Pat Skipper guest-starred as Harris Townsend, a retired U.S. Special Forces sniper who reluctantly assists the BAU during a standoff. In the episode "Lucky", Michael Beach guest-starred as Father Marks, and Nick Searcy guest-starred as Detective Jordan. In the episode "True Night", Frankie Muniz guest-starred as Johnny McHale, a famous comic book artist whose recent works have striking resemblances to murders he might have committed.

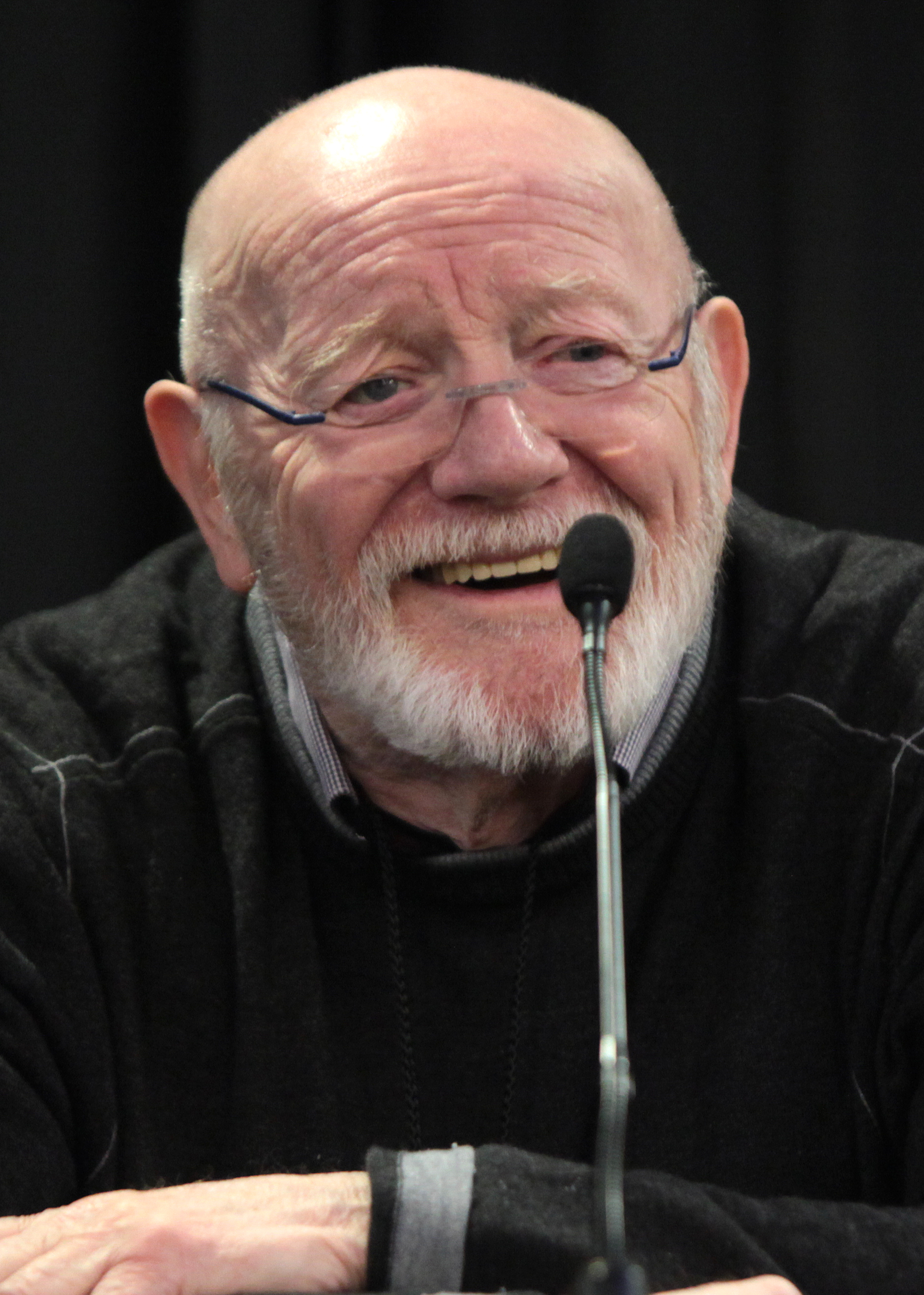
W. Morgan Sheppard appears in the episode "Birthright" as John Caulfield.

In the episode "3rd Life", Riley Smith guest-starred as Ryan Phillips, a thrill killer who leads a trio of abductors. Gia Mantegna (daughter of series star Joe Mantegna) guest-starred as Lindsey Vaughan, a teenage girl who is kidnapped by Ryan's gang, Hayley McFarland guest-starred as Katie Owens, the first victim raped and murdered by Ryan's Gang, Fredric Lehne guest-starred as Jack Vaughan, a former hitman and Lindsey's father, and Michael Harney guest-starred as U.S. Marshal Pat Mannan.

In the episode "Limelight", Andrea Roth guest-starred as Jill Morris, an FBI Agent whose lust for fame and less concern for eventual collateral damage becomes more apparent to the BAU. In the episode "Damaged", Dennis Christopher guest-starred as Abner Merriman, a prison warden who allows Hotch and Reid to interview Chester Hardwick, an inmate on death row.

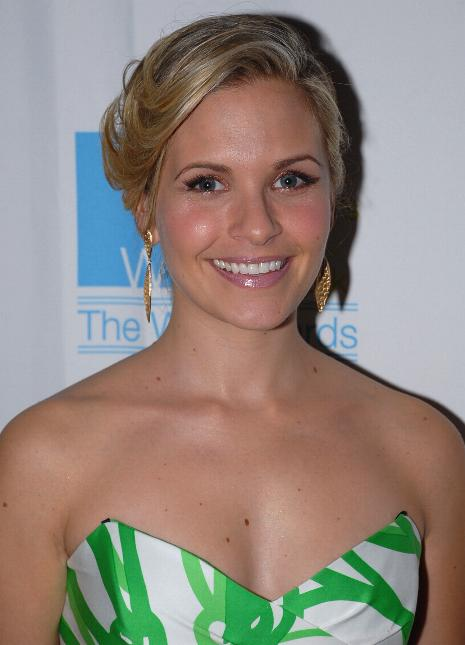
Sally Pressman appears in the episode "Birthright" as Chrissy Wilkinson.

In the episode "A Higher Power", Jennifer Aspen guest-starred as Laurie Ann Morris, a depressed woman who was convinced by Peter Redding to commit suicide. Renee O'Connor guest-starred as Pam Baleman, the wife of Paul Baleman, one of the apparent suicides, and sister-in-law of Detective Ronnie Baleman, who is investigating. In the episode "Elephant's Memory", Cody Kasch guest-starred as Owen Savage, a spree killer who is going after those who have wronged him during his childhood. Lindsey Haun guest-starred as Jordan Norris, Owen's girlfriend, and Alexandra Krosney guest-starred as Eileen Bechtold, Jordan's friend. In the episode "In Heat", Michael Graziadei guest-starred as Steven Fitzgerald, a serial killer confused about his sexual orientation. Tia Texada guest-starred as Detective Tina Lopez, who leads the investigation of the murders.

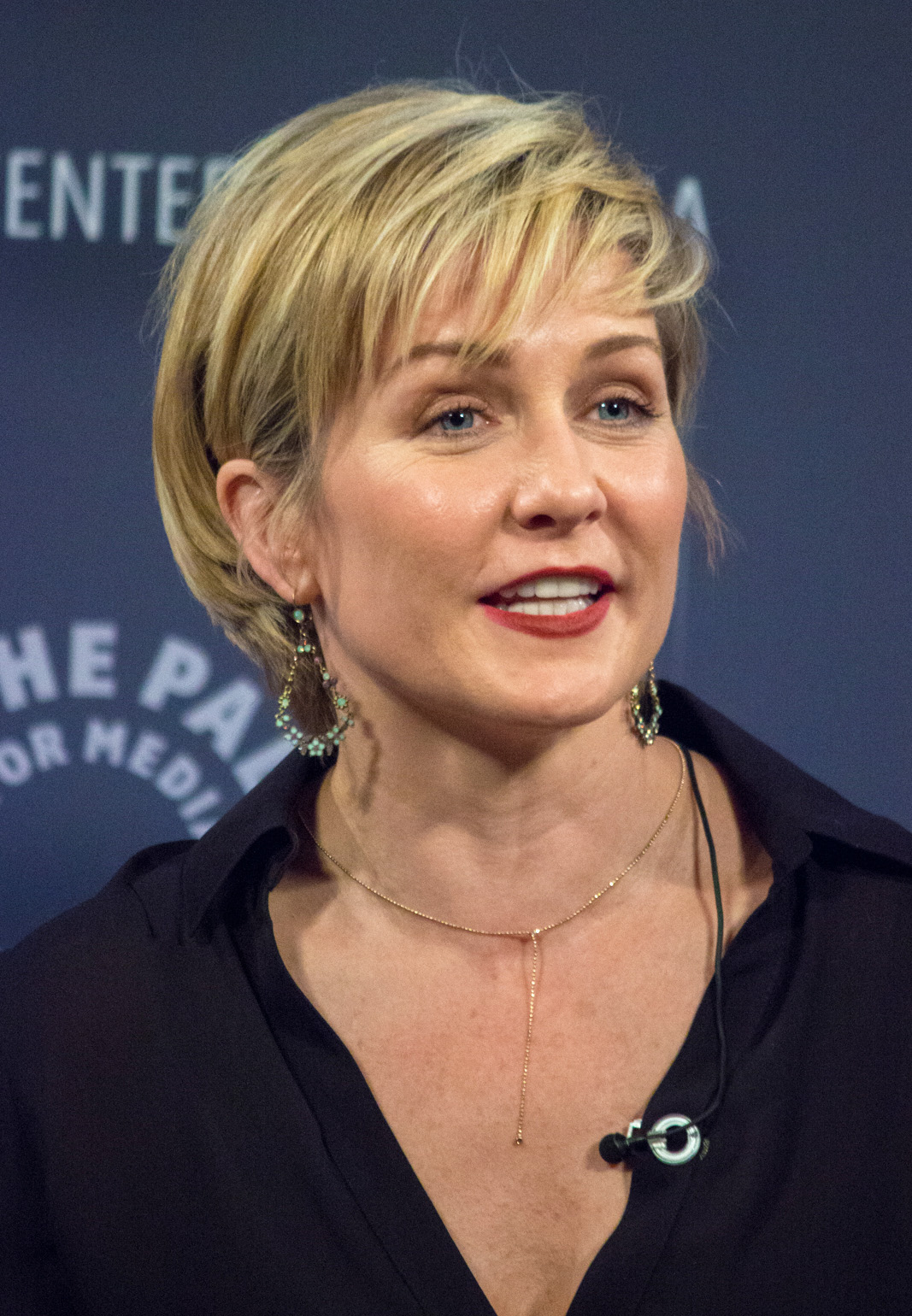
Blue Bloods star Amy Carlson appears in the episode "Tabula Rasa" as Cece Hillenbrand.

In the episode "The Crossing", Scott Lowell guest-starred as Michael Hicks, a delusional stalker who obsesses over a woman named Keri Derzmond, played by Bonnie Root. Mary-Margaret Humes guest-starred as Audrey Sawyer-Henson, a battered housewife and mother who murdered her husband. In the episode "Tabula Rasa", Eric Lange guest-starred as Brian Matloff, aka "The Blue Ridge Strangler", a serial killer who suffers from amnesia after he attempted to evade the BAU by jumping off a building. In the season finale "Lo-Fi", Sienna Guillory guest-starred as Supervisory Special Agent Kate Joyner, an FBI Agent who aids the BAU in arresting members of the New York Terrorist Cell. Erik Palladino guest-starred as Detective Cooper, an NYPD officer who is shot in the line of duty by a member of the NYC terrorist cell.

== Episodes ==
No. overall	No. in season	Title	Directed by	Written by	Original release date	Prod. code	U.S. viewers (millions)
46	1	"Doubt"	Gloria Muzio	Chris Mundy	September 26, 2007	221	12.66
When three female students at a Flagstaff, Arizona university are stabbed to death, the BAU sets their sights on a campus security guard, only to find themselves doubting their profiling skills when a fourth woman is murdered while their prime suspect is in custody.
47	2	"In Name and Blood"	Edward Allen Bernero	Chris Mundy	October 3, 2007	301	14.56
With Gideon missing, Hotch transferring, and Prentiss resigning, Strauss and the remaining members of the BAU set out to track down a Milwaukee, Wisconsin spree killer who cuts women's hearts out with a chisel.
48	3	"Scared to Death"	Félix Alcalá	Debra J. Fisher & Erica Messer	October 10, 2007	302	14.55
When four bodies are found in a mass grave in Portland, Oregon, the BAU determines the victims all died at the hands of a serial killer who uses people's greatest fears to his advantage. The team struggles to come to terms with Gideon's departure.
49	4	"Children of the Dark"	Guy Norman Bee	Dan Dworkin & Jay Beattie	October 17, 2007	303	15.03
When three suburban Denver, Colorado families are murdered in their homes, with the parents bludgeoned to death and the children euthanized, the BAU sets out to identify a pair of family annihilators with a sinister ulterior motive.
50	5	"Seven Seconds"	John Gallagher	Andi Bushell	October 24, 2007	304	15.05
When a six-year-old Virginia girl disappears from the Potomac Mills Mall one week after another girl is abducted from a different mall and murdered, the BAU juggles searching for the missing girl and identifying her kidnapper.
51	6	"About Face"	Skipp Sudduth	Charles Murray	October 31, 2007	305	14.94
When a Carrollton, Texas woman disappears after finding a missing persons photo of herself taped to her front door, the BAU searches for a serial killer with a mysterious motive. The team welcomes veteran profiler David Rossi (Joe Mantegna), returning full-time to the FBI after a period of semi-retirement.
52	7	"Identity"	Gwyneth Horder-Payton	Oanh Ly	November 7, 2007	306	14.65
When a Great Falls, Montana woman disappears and one half of a serial-killing duo commits suicide after getting caught by local police on the same day, the BAU juggles connecting the woman's disappearance with three other missing women, identifying the second killer, and rescuing the duo's latest victim. The team speculates on the reasons why Rossi came out of retirement.
53	8	"Lucky"	Steve Boyum	Andrew Wilder	November 14, 2007	307	15.73
When a Florida woman is found dead with several fingers cut off, the BAU sets out to track down a cannibalistic serial killer. Meanwhile, Morgan struggles with a crisis of faith and Garcia finds herself in a life-threatening situation.
54	9	"Penelope"	Félix Alcalá	Chris Mundy	November 21, 2007	308	15.88
With Garcia fighting for her life, the BAU determines her attacker is someone close to the investigation. After Hotch assigns analyst Kevin Lynch (Nicholas Brendon) to search Garcia's computer, Kevin unearths a file that could jeopardize Garcia's career with the FBI.
55	10	"True Night"	Edward Allen Bernero	Edward Allen Bernero	November 28, 2007	309	16.23
When the latest in a series of gang-related killings takes place in Los Angeles, California, the BAU gradually suspects the crime scenes mirror drawings by a graphic novelist suffering from severe PTSD.
56	11	"Birthright"	John Gallagher	Debra J. Fisher & Erica Messer	December 12, 2007	310	14.18
When two Fredericksburg, Virginia women are found mutilated and a third is reported missing, the BAU determines the murders mimic a series of crimes that occurred 27 years earlier. They must interview the only known survivor of the original killing spree in order to identify the unsub and rescue his latest victims.
57	12	"3rd Life"	Anthony Hemingway	Simon Mirren	January 9, 2008	311	14.30
When a teenage Chula Vista, California girl is found dead and her best friend is reported missing, the BAU launches an intense manhunt and attempts to connect the missing girl's disappearance to a crime her father witnessed 10 years earlier.
58	13	"Limelight"	Glenn Kershaw	Dan Dworkin & Jay Beattie	January 23, 2008	312	12.67
When the contents of a Philadelphia, Pennsylvania self-storage unit are sold at auction and reveal evidence of a misogynistic serial killer, the BAU works with an FBI agent bent on making a name for herself to profile and track down the killer.
59	14	"Damaged"	Edward Allen Bernero	Edward Allen Bernero	April 2, 2008	313	12.81
While Hotch and Reid interview a prolific death row inmate in Connecticut, the rest of the BAU travels to Indianapolis, Indiana to investigate an unsolved double homicide that has plagued Rossi for 20 years.
60	15	"A Higher Power"	Félix Alcalá	Michael Udesky	April 9, 2008	314	13.33
When a Pittsburgh, Pennsylvania neighborhood experiences an unusually high suicide rate, the BAU suspects the crimes are being committed by a serial killer who sees himself as an Angel of Death. Hotch takes personal time off after Haley presents him with divorce papers.
61	16	"Elephant's Memory"	Bobby Roth	Andrew S. Wilder	April 16, 2008	315	12.98
When a Texas man is killed in a house fire and two police officers investigating the incident are gunned down, the BAU sets out to track down a teenager (Cody Kasch) with ties to one of the officers and the man's daughter. Reid becomes emotionally involved with the case after empathizing with the prime suspect.
62	17	"In Heat"	John Gallagher	Andi Bushell	April 30, 2008	316	13.03
When a Miami, Florida serial killer claims a vacationing New Orleans, Louisiana police detective as his next victim and steals his gun, the BAU works with Detective Will LaMontagne, Jr. (Josh Stewart) to apprehend the killer before he strikes again. Meanwhile, JJ attempts to keep a secret that may be catching up with her.
63	18	"The Crossing"	Guy Norman Bee	Debra J. Fisher & Erica Messer	May 7, 2008	317	12.88
While Hotch and Rossi interview a Boston, Massachusetts woman claiming to suffer from battered woman syndrome after confessing to the recent murder of her husband, the remaining members of the BAU set out to protect a Silver Spring, Maryland woman from a man who has been stalking her for the last two years.
64	19	"Tabula Rasa"	Steve Boyum	Dan Dworkin & Jay Beattie	May 14, 2008	318	12.88
When a Roanoke, Virginia man wanted for the murders of three women wakes up from a four-year coma after narrowly surviving a fall from a building while trying to evade the authorities, he insists of not remembering the crimes that were committed by him or even his own identity. The BAU relies on brain fingerprinting to determine if his claims are true.
65	20	"Lo-Fi"	Glenn Kershaw	Chris Mundy	May 21, 2008	319	13.15
When the latest in a series of shootings takes place in New York City, the BAU sets out to determine if the crimes are the work of one killer or a team. Hotch endures a tense reunion with an old acquaintance and JJ makes a surprising announcement.

== Home media ==
The Complete Third Season
Set details		Special features
20 episodes; 5-disc set; Aspect Ratio: 2.35:1; Subtitles: English; English: Dolby Digital 5.1		Profile: Rossi/ Mantegna; Shemar Moore: Criminal Minds’ Wild Ride; From Script To Screen: “True Night”; Killer Roles; The Criminal Element: The Making of Criminal Minds, Season 3; Gag Reel; Deleted Scenes
DVD release date
Region 1	Region 2	Region 4
September 16, 2008	April 6, 2009	March 18, 2009
