= Ringers: Lord of the Fans =

- Directed by: Carlene Cordova
- Written by: Cliff Broadway; Carlene Cordova
- Produced by: Cliff Broadway; Carlene Cordova; Jeff Marchelletta; Tom DeSanto
- Starring: The cast of the Jackson films and various fans
- Narrated by: Dominic Monaghan
- Cinematography: Josh Mandel
- Edited by: Arnaud Gerardy, John Welch
- Music by: Robin DiMaggio
- Distributed by: Stormcrow Entertainment, Previous: Sony Pictures Home Entertainment
- Release date: 2005
- Running time: 97 minutes
- Country: United States
- Language: English

Ringers: Lord of the Fans is a 2005 documentary film investigating the growth of the Tolkien fandom all the way from the release of The Hobbit book by J. R. R. Tolkien in 1937 to Peter Jackson's The Lord of the Rings trilogy (2001–2003).

The film tells about the early days of the Tolkien fandom when it was part of the hippie culture and influenced many people in the pop world, some of whom became famous and are interviewed, including David Carradine, and Lemmy of Motörhead. Ringers includes Leonard Nimoy (Spock in Star Trek) performing "The Ballad of Bilbo Baggins."

The Mythopoeic Society and the Tolkien Society are mentioned. The film also tells the story of the cartoon version of The Hobbit and The Lord of the Rings animated films. The success of the Peter Jackson films is described through interviews with Jackson and the stars of the trilogy.

The film is narrated by Dominic Monaghan.

== Awards ==
Ringers: Lord of the Fans won the award for Outstanding Achievement in a Documentary at the 2005 Newport Beach Film Festival and was nominated for Best DVD Release at the 2006 Saturn Awards.
