= I Sell the Dead =

I Sell The Dead
- Theatrical release poster
- Directed by: Glenn McQuaid
- Written by: Glenn McQuaid
- Produced by: Larry Fessenden; Peter Phok
- Starring: Dominic Monaghan; Larry Fessenden; Angus Scrimm; Ron Perlman
- Cinematography: Richard V. Lopez
- Edited by: Glenn McQuaid
- Music by: Jeff Grace
- Production company: Glass Eye Pix
- Distributed by: IFC Films
- Release dates: October 10, 2008 (Sitges Film Festival); August 7, 2009 (United States)
- Running time: 85 minutes
- Country: United States
- Language: English
- Budget: $450,000
- Box office: $8,050 (US)

I Sell the Dead is a 2008 American horror comedy period film about grave robbing, starring Dominic Monaghan, Ron Perlman, Larry Fessenden, and Angus Scrimm. It is the feature film debut from Irish director Glenn McQuaid.

== Plot ==
While awaiting his execution for murder and grave robbery, Arthur Blake (Dominic Monaghan) is visited by Father Duffy (Ron Perlman), who wishes to obtain a statement from the condemned to be used as a cautionary tale. Arthur denies that he is a murderer, a crime for which his former partner, Willie Grimes (Larry Fessenden), has already been executed by guillotine. However, Arthur freely admits to being a grave robber, and begins to recount his career with Willie.

Arthur became Willie's apprentice following the death of Arthur's father, forcing the young man to find a job to support his family. Willie quickly taught him the skills necessary to steal corpses, both from graves as well as more risky locations, such as wakes. The job proved profitable on its face, but both Arthur and Willie's ability to make money was severely hampered by the interference of Doctor Quint (Angus Scrimm), who frequently blackmailed the two into obtaining corpses for free under threat of notifying the police of their activities. This blackmail continued for many years.

Willie and Arthur's career changed abruptly when procuring another corpse for Quint. Digging up a corpse buried at a cross-roads, the two were confused when they found a garlic wreath around the body's neck and a wooden stake in its chest. Arthur dismissed these things as superstition, and removed them against Willie's protests. Moments later, while the two were clearing their cart, the dead woman rose and walked away. Willie and Arthur attempted to flee, but came across the undead woman, who attacked Arthur. Willie was able to fend her off briefly with a shovel, and when she attacked him he managed to plunge the stake back into her chest, causing her to go immediately limp. Willie and Arthur delivered the staked body to Doctor Quint and departed quickly. The doctor removed the stake, awakening the undead woman, who killed him.

Freed of their blackmailer and now aware of a new market for their skills, Arthur and Willie shifted their career towards the supernatural side of grave robbing. During one such job (retrieving a body resembling a Grey alien) they were stopped by Cornelius Murphy, main spokesperson for the House of Murphy, an infamous and vicious band of grave robbers led by Cornelius' unseen father, Samuel. Cornelius demanded the body at knifepoint; though Willie advised him to cooperate, Arthur refused, and the three scuffled over the body until it vanished in a burst of light.

At this point in Arthur's narrative, Father Duffy asks him if he had any further encounters with the House of Murphy. Arthur is reluctant to speak of the matter, but finally relents, discussing the next—and last—time he encountered the Murphys.

Drinking at a local pub with their new apprentice (and Arthur's girlfriend) Fanny, Arthur and Willie received word from pub owner Ronnie about a possible job: a local mortuary had been reported as receiving crated shipments of the undead. However, their most recent shipment was incomplete, two of the crates lost in a shipwreck and believed to be located on a nearby island. The catch was that the mortuary had already hired someone to retrieve the missing undead: The House of Murphy. Willie and Arthur initially turned down the job, not wishing to cross paths with the Murphys, but at Fanny's insistence the two reluctantly agreed.

On the island the crates, are guarded by Bulger, House of Murphy's enforcer. Fanny slit his throat (to Arthur and Willie's surprise), then the three rounded up one of the undead, Willie suffering a bite during the effort. Before they could get to the second, Fanny was killed by a knife thrown by Cornelius, who then tied the remaining two to the cage containing the captured undead. The two were only saved from death when the captured undead tore free of its cage and attacked Valentine, Murphy's disfigured female assassin. Cornelius attempted to save Valentine, only to be attacked by the second undead. Willie and Arthur freed themselves, then escaped in the confusion. Afterward, the two argued bitterly over the botched job, resulting in the end of their partnership, and friendship. A week later, the two were arrested.

At the conclusion of the tale, Father Duffy asks whether it was Arthur or Willie who murdered Cornelius, but Arthur reiterates that the two simply left him to his fate. When Father Duffy expresses a surprising amount of anger at this, as well as the sentiment that Willie was "lucky" to have been killed before Duffy could meet him, Arthur realizes the priest's true identity: Samuel Murphy. The elder Murphy then attempts to kill Arthur with a mace, but, before he can, he is struck down by an unseen rescuer. When he is able to look up, Arthur is surprised to discover his rescuer is Willie—more accurately, the decapitated body of Willie. Holding his head in one hand, Willie explains that the bite he suffered on the island seems to have rendered him undead following his execution. As the two make their way out of the prison cell, Willie remarks that being undead is the best thing that ever happened to him, and even suggests that Arthur himself get bitten. When Arthur rejects the idea, Willie claims he's starting to feel "ravenous", and jokingly chases after Arthur as they leave the prison.

Unknown to them, Cornelius rises from his underwater grave.

== Cast ==
- Dominic Monaghan as Arthur Blake
- Larry Fessenden as Willie Grimes
- Ron Perlman as Father Duffy
- Brenda Cooney as Fanny Briers (spelled "Bryers" in some captions for the hearing impaired)
- John Speredakos as Cornelius Murphy
- Heather Bullock as Valentine
- Alisdair Stewart as Bulger
- Angus Scrimm as Doctor Quint
- Joel Garland as Ronnie
- Aidan Redmond as Jack Flood
- Jonathan M. Parisen as Towns Folk #1

== Production ==
The film was based on McQuaid's 2005 short film The Resurrection Apprentice, which also starred Fessenden. After a muted response to the more serious and dramatic tone of the short, McQuaid reworked the idea to be more comedic. Scrimm was cast when McQuaid met him on the set of another Fessenden project. When Scrimm mentioned to Fessenden's son that he could play the violin, McQuaid added a scene to showcase this talent. Perlman had worked with McQuaid and Fessenden previously on The Last Winter. Perlman's role was expanded after he pointed out that it was light. Monaghan was approached by producer Peter Phok. Shooting took place in Staten Island, New York City. Production was halted for five months while co-star Perlman starred in Hellboy II: The Golden Army.

== Release ==
In 2009, the film was picked up for distribution by IFC (US), Anchor Bay (Canada, UK and Australia) and Screen Media (foreign sales). The Blu-ray Disc was released on March 30, 2010 in the United States.

== Critical reception ==
I Sell The Dead has received primarily positive reviews. As of October 2026, it holds a 72% approval rating on review aggregator Rotten Tomatoes, based on 46 reviews with an average rating of 5.80/10. The site's consensus reads: "A horror comedy that's almost as chilling as it is funny, I Sell the Dead relies on its dark humor and offbeat charm to overcome its low budget shortcomings." Online critic Maitland McDonagh stated, "A fresh, darkly funny blend of crime [graverobbing, to be precise] and supernatural hijinks ... that delivers an offbeat but carefully balanced mix of shocks, homages and uneasy chuckles." Dennis Harvey of Variety wrote that the film "doesn't build much narrative steam" but will entertain horror fans. Manohla Dargis of The New York Times wrote that although the jokes and setup wear thin, the filmmakers' enthusiasm carries the film. In a negative review, Michael Ordona of the Los Angeles Times wrote that the film lacks both scares and humor. Nicolas Rapold of The Village Voice called the premise "snack food for horror hobbyists" but said the film's editing focuses on the wrong scenes. Jeannette Catsoulis of NPR wrote that the film is "more slapstick than horror" but has "genuinely chilling moments". Noel Murray of The A.V. Club rated it a letter grade of B and wrote that the veteran cast carries the film. Andrew Kasch of Dread Central rated it 4/5 stars and wrote, "[T]his is a film made by horror fans for horror fans with enough fun to please almost any crowd."

I Sell the Dead won the 2009 Slamdance Award.

== Comic ==
Image Comics released a comic book adaptation of the movie on 7 October 2009.

== Soundtrack ==
In the summer of 2015, Deep Focus Records released the official soundtrack on vinyl.

== Sequel ==
Scareflix planned a sequel for 2011, which has not, as yet, been made.
