= Dominic Monaghan =

British actor (born 1977)

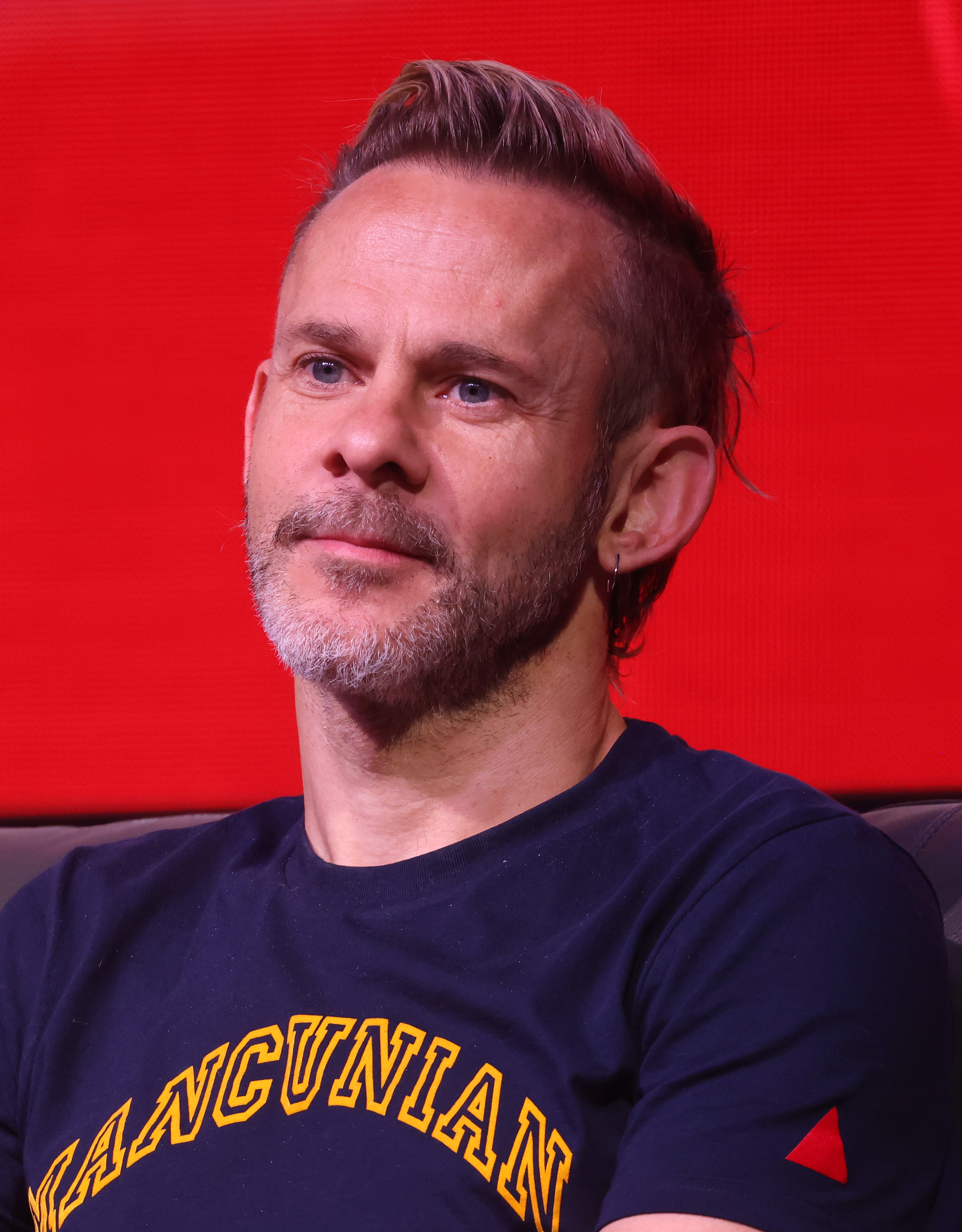
- Monaghan in 2024
- Born: Dominic Bernard Patrick Luke Monaghan; 8 December 1976 (age 49); West Berlin, West Germany
- Occupation: Actor
- Years active: 1994–present
- Partner(s): Evangeline Lilly (2004–2007)

Dominic Bernard Patrick Luke Monaghan (born 8 December 1976) is a British actor. He is best known for playing Meriadoc "Merry" Brandybuck in Peter Jackson's film trilogy The Lord of the Rings (2001–2003), and Charlie Pace on the ABC television drama Lost (2004–2010).

Monaghan first gained fame as Hetty Wainthropp's sidekick Geoffrey in Hetty Wainthropp Investigates (1996–1998). His first film role was as Sasha in the television film Hostile Waters (1997) based on the true story of a Soviet and a US submarine colliding in the Cold War. His other film roles include playing the young mutant Chris Bradley formerly known as Bolt in the superhero film X-Men Origins: Wolverine (2009) and playing Beaumont Kin in Star Wars: The Rise of Skywalker (2019), reuniting with J.J. Abrams, the co-creator of Lost. He has also hosted the nature programme Wild Things with Dominic Monaghan (2012–2016), which earned him an Emmy Award nomination for Outstanding Unstructured Reality Program.

== Early life ==
Monaghan was born in West Berlin, West Germany, to British parents: Maureen, a nurse, and Austin Monaghan, a science teacher of Irish descent. Monaghan's family lived in Berlin, Düsseldorf, Stuttgart and Münster, moving about every four years. When he was about 11 years old, his family moved to Heaton Moor in Stockport, England. In Stockport, he attended St Anne's Roman Catholic High School (where his uncle taught and later became head teacher) and Aquinas College, where he studied English literature, drama and geography.

== Career ==
Although Monaghan held many occupations when he was younger, he long wanted to be an actor. After his second year at St Anne's, Monaghan became a regular in school plays such as Oliver Twist, A Christmas Carol and Bugsy Malone before joining the Manchester Youth Theatre. There, he was scouted for Hetty Wainthropp Investigates, in which he starred alongside Patricia Routledge and Derek Benfield as Hetty's under-aged sidekick, Geoffrey Shawcross, for four series. Monaghan has since credited Routledge as "an amazing teacher" who taught him some "very valuable lessons" that have influenced his acting career. He made his feature-film debut as Russian sailor Sasha in the TV film Hostile Waters.

Monaghan later starred in The Lord of the Rings film trilogy as Meriadoc Brandybuck, for which he achieved international acclaim and success. Monaghan narrated Ringers: Lord of the Fans, a documentary about The Lord of the Rings fandom. He also provided the narration for The Discovery Channel's documentary Devil's Bible in 2008. He also appeared in Soldiers of Fortune alongside Sean Bean and Christian Slater. He was a regular cast member on the ABC series Lost from 2004 to 2007, playing English former rockstar and drug addict Charlie Pace. Monaghan returned to the series as a special guest star after departing from the main cast.

In 2009, Monaghan starred as Chris Bradley / Bolt in X-Men Origins: Wolverine. On 15 July 2009, it was confirmed that he would join the cast of ABC Studios' science-fiction television series FlashForward as the character Simon. The series premiered on 24 September 2009. It was cancelled after its first season.

On 18 March 2010, Monaghan was spotted at the Universal Sheraton filming a short titled Gloria. It was part of a programme titled REESES Puff's Extraordinary Cinema (where the teenagers replace the pros). He played the part of Caleb Reese.

In 2010, Monaghan and US actress Megan Fox made an appearance as a couple in an abusive relationship in the music video for Rihanna and Eminem's song "Love the Way You Lie". Scenes include the celebrities on top of a liquor store. Fox and Monaghan also filmed inside the store and "at a seedy dive bar next door" to the store.

In November 2012, a new show on Channel 5 titled Wild Things with Dominic Monaghan started airing in the United Kingdom. The documentary shows Monaghan travelling to different locations such as Venezuela and Ecuador to film and interact with the exotic and often dangerous local wildlife.

During the summer of 2013, Monaghan appeared in various live-action teasers for 2K Marin's science-fiction video game The Bureau: XCOM Declassified.

Monaghan is a fan of The Gaffer Tapes: Fantasy Football Podcast and has appeared as a guest between April–November 2016, as well as May 2018, and submitted several audio questions which are played on the podcast. While appearing as a guest, Monaghan said "It's the best fantasy football podcast out there".

Monaghan is a contributing writer for the music and culture magazine Paste, primarily writing articles about Premier League football.

Monaghan is the voice of Sightseeing Manchester's bus tour, recorded in March 2016.

In 2018, he played a serial killer in Channel 9 Australia's murder-mystery/drama TV series Bite Club, filmed in and around Sydney.

He was named as part of the cast for the last film in the sequel trilogy which is Star Wars: The Rise of Skywalker, reuniting with J.J. Abrams, a co-creator of Lost. He appeared as Beaumont.

In May 2020, Monaghan joined with fellow Lord of the Rings castmates, along with writer Philippa Boyens and director Peter Jackson, to appear on Josh Gad's YouTube series Reunited Apart, which reunites the cast of popular films through video-conferencing, and promotes donations to non-profit charities. Monaghan and castmate Billy Boyd started the podcast The Friendship Onion, where they talk about their time filming The Lord of the Rings.

He made his stage debut in 2024 with Lord of the Rings castmate Boyd in the Canadian production of Tom Stoppard's Rosencrantz and Guildenstern Are Dead.

== Personal life ==
Monaghan is a nature-lover and has been active in planting trees and cacti. He bought a mango-tree forest in India. Monaghan has loved insects and reptiles since his childhood and has kept an exotic assortment of pets, including a leaf-mantis named Gizmo, a black widow spider named Witchitar, and an albino snake named Blink. The species of spider Ctenus monaghani is named after him.

An avid outdoorsman, Monaghan enjoys activities such as surfing, kayaking, snowboarding, football, basketball, and hiking. He has also explained that he likes hunting for insects and reptiles outdoors. He learned karate as a child, used to practise yoga, and often goes to the gym for strength and weight training. He has been a fan of Manchester United since his childhood.

Monaghan loves playing all games and has hosted game nights for fellow cast members and is also fond of The New York Times' crossword puzzle. He enjoys playing League of Legends with fellow Lord of the Rings cast member Billy Boyd. He is fluent in German.

On his right arm he has a tattoo of the English word "nine" written in the artificial script of Tengwar, a reference to his involvement in The Lord of the Rings and the fact that his character was one of the nine members of the Fellowship of the Ring. Seven other cast members and John Rhys-Davies' stunt double also got matching tattoos during the film's production, at Monaghan's instigation. Below that tattoo is another that reads, "Life imitates art", an Oscar Wilde quote. On his left arm is a tattoo, "Living is easy with eyes closed", a line from The Beatles' "Strawberry Fields Forever". He also has two stars tattooed on his left foot: one black, and one white. In 2010, Monaghan got two more tattoos, one on the upper side of the back ("Love you take is equal to the love you make", taken from the song "The End" by The Beatles). The other, done by Kat Von D on the reality TV series LA Ink, is located on his lower right arm and reads "Luminous beings are we, not this crude matter", a quote from Yoda.

He resides in Los Angeles, California. In 2008, Monaghan held a photographic exhibition in Los Angeles in which he sold prints of his own works. A portion of the proceeds from the exhibition were given to an orangutan rescue organisation.

Monaghan was in a relationship with his Lost co-star Evangeline Lilly from 2004 until 2007. In June 2008, Monaghan travelled to Argentina with Lilly to film the pilot of the US version of CQC.

Monaghan provided the inspiration for the naming of Billy Boyd's band Beecake after he sent his friend a picture of a cake covered in bees.

In 2024, Monaghan announced he had obtained Irish citizenship.

== Filmography ==
=== Film ===
Year	Title	Role	Notes
2001	The Lord of the Rings: The Fellowship of the Ring	Meriadoc Brandybuck	Phoenix Film Critics Society Award for Best Cast; Nominated—Empire Award for Best Newcomer; Nominated—Screen Actors Guild Award for Outstanding Performance by a Cast in a Motion Picture
2002	The Lord of the Rings: The Two Towers	Meriadoc Brandybuck	Phoenix Film Critics Society Award for Best Cast; Nominated—Screen Actors Guild Award for Outstanding Performance by a Cast in a Motion Picture
2003	The Lord of the Rings: The Return of the King	Meriadoc Brandybuck	Critics' Choice Movie Award for Best Acting Ensemble; National Board of Review Award for Best Cast; Online Film Critics Society Award for Best Cast; Screen Actors Guild Award for Outstanding Performance by a Cast in a Motion Picture; Nominated—Phoenix Film Critics Society Award for Best Cast
2003	An Insomniac's Nightmare	Jack	Short film
2004	Spivs	Goat	
2004	The Purifiers	Sol	
2005	Ringers: Lord of the Fans	Narrator	Voice
2005	Shooting Livien	Owen Scott	
2008	I Sell the Dead	Arthur Blake	
2009	X-Men Origins: Wolverine	Chris Bradley	Nominated—People's Choice Award for Favorite On-Screen Team
2011	The Day	Rick	
2012	The Millionaire Tour	Casper	
2012	Soldiers of Fortune	Tommy Sin	
2015	Molly Moon and the Incredible Book of Hypnotism	Nockman	
2016	Pet	Seth	
2017	Atomica	Robinson Scott	
2018	Mute	Oswald	
2018	Waterlily Jaguar	Bill	
2019	Radioflash	Chris	
2019	Star Wars: The Rise of Skywalker	Beaumont Kin	
2021	Edge of the World	Colonel Arthur Crookshank	
2022	Last Looks	Warren Gomes	
2024	The Lord of the Rings: The War of the Rohirrim	Wrot	Voice
2025	Long Shadows	Ned Duxbury	

=== Television ===
Key
†	Denotes television productions that have not yet been released

Year	Title	Role	Notes
1996–1998	Hetty Wainthropp Investigates	Geoffrey Shawcross	27 episodes
1997	Hostile Waters	Sasha	Television film
2000	This Is Personal: The Hunt for the Yorkshire Ripper	Jimmy Furey	Television film
2000	Monsignor Renard	Etienne Pierre Rollinger	3 episodes
2004	I Love the '90s	Himself	Commentator
2004–2010	Lost	Charlie Pace	65 episodes Screen Actors Guild Award for Outstanding Performance by an Ensemble in a Drama Series; Nominated—Monte-Carlo Television Festival Award for Outstanding Actor – Drama Series; Nominated—Prism Award for Performance in a Drama Series; Nominated—Saturn Award for Best Supporting Actor on Television
2005	I Love the '90s: Part Deux	Himself	Commentator
2008	MADtv	Himself	2 episodes
2008	Caiga Quien Caiga	Himself	Episode: "#12.15"
2009	Chuck	Tyler Martin	Episode: "Chuck Versus the Third Dimension"
2009–2010	FlashForward	Dr. Simon Campos	15 episodes
2010	Top Gear	Himself	2 episodes
2012	The Unknown	Mark Nickel	6 episodes
2012	Children's Hospital	Dr. Owen Maestro	"British Hospital"
2012–2016	Wild Things with Dominic Monaghan	Himself	30 episodes Nominated—Canadian Screen Award for Best Science or Nature Documentary Program/Series; Nominated—Critics' Choice Television Award for Best Reality Series; Nominated—OFTA Award for Best Host or Panelist in a Non-Fiction Program; Nominated—Primetime Emmy Award for Outstanding Unstructured Reality Program
2013	Ridiculousness	Himself	"Dominic Monaghan"
2013	The Eric Andre Show	Himself	"Krysten Ritter/Dominic Monaghan"
2015	100 Code	Tommy Conley	12 episodes
2017	Sofia the First	Fig	Voice; "The Crown of Blossoms"
2017	A Midsummer's Nightmare	Mike Puck	Television film
2018	Bite Club	Senior Constable Stephen Langley	Premiered 15 August, Nine Network, Australia
2022	The Legend of Vox Machina	Archibald Desnay	Voice; 3 episodes
2022	Moonhaven	Paul Serno	TV show
2024	Angry Birds Mystery Island	Hamylton	Voice; 16 episodes
2025–present	The Librarians: The Next Chapter	Merlin	Guest (season 1), recurring (season 2)
2025	Billy and Dom Eat the World	Himself	8 episodes
2027	The Traitors †	Contestant	Season 6

=== Theatre ===
Year	Title	Role	Venue	Notes
2024	Rosencrantz and Guildenstern Are Dead	Rosencrantz	Neptune Theatre	
2024	Rosencrantz and Guildenstern Are Dead	Rosencrantz	CAA Theatre	

=== Music videos ===
Year	Artist	Title	Role
2010	Eminem featuring Rihanna	"Love the Way You Lie"	The Boyfriend

=== Video games ===
Year	Title	Voice role	Notes
2003	The Lord of the Rings: The Return of the King	Meriadoc "Merry" Brandybuck	Based on the film of the same name
2003	The Lord of the Rings: The Battle for Middle-earth	Meriadoc "Merry" Brandybuck	
2012	Lego The Lord of the Rings	Meriadoc "Merry" Brandybuck	Archive audio
2016	Quantum Break	William "Will" Joyce	Also motion capture
2021	Call of Duty: Vanguard	Jannick Richter	Also motion capture

=== Audio dramas ===
Year	Title	Role	Notes
1999	Stockport, So Good They Named It Once	Jason Conroy	BBC Radio sitcom, Series 1 only
2022	Moriarty: The Devil's Game	Professor James Moriarty	Audible Original
2023	Moriarty: The Silent Order, Book 2	Professor James Moriarty	Audible Original
