= Ian Stone =

British comedian

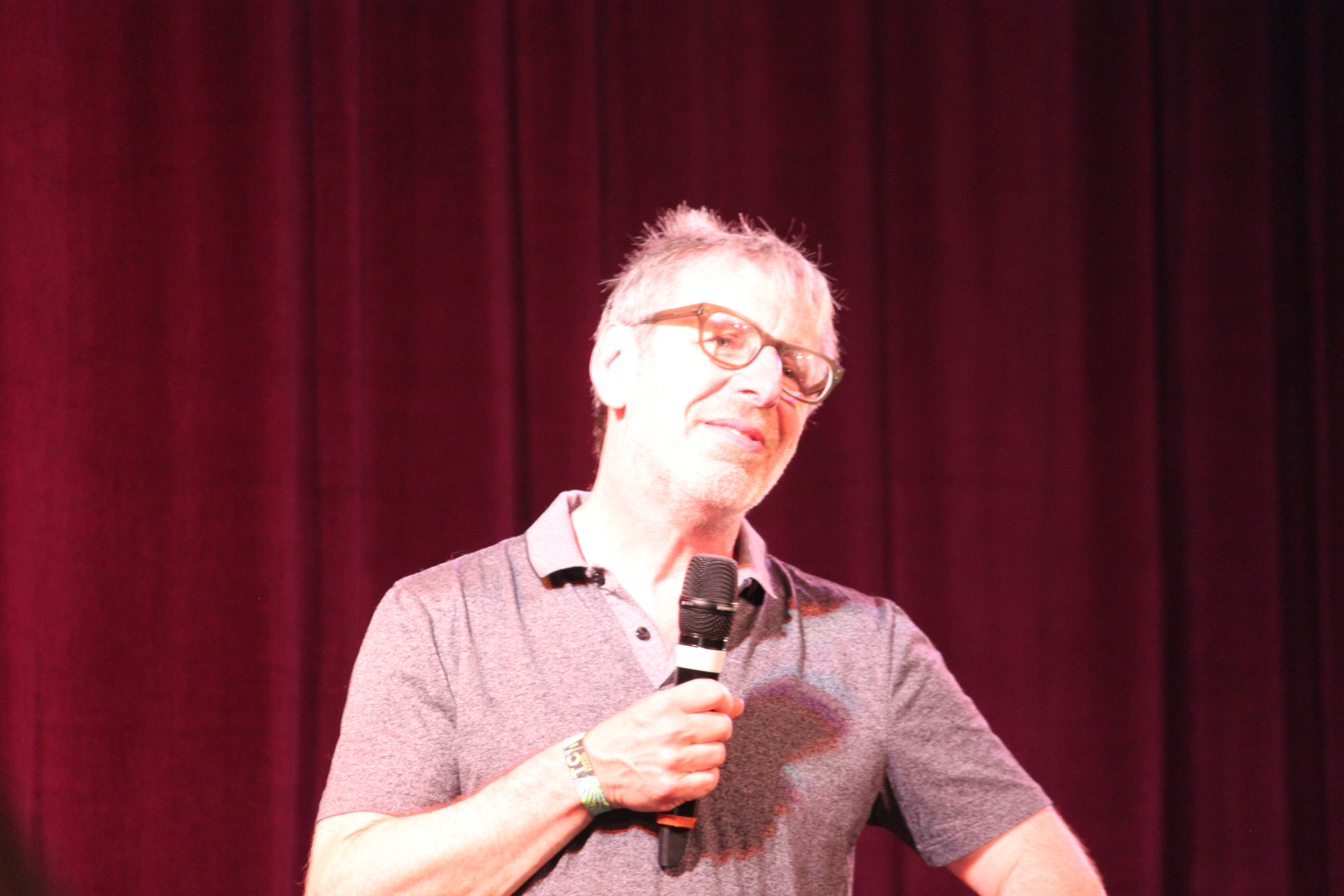
Ian Stone in the Cabaret Tent at Glastonbury Festival 2019

Ian Stone is a British stand-up comedian, broadcaster and writer notable for appearing as a guest on shows such as the comedy panel show Mock the Week. Stone was also a regular guest on BBC Radio 5's Fighting Talk. His book about following The Jam and growing up in London in the late 1970s was published by Unbound in June 2020.

== Career ==
Stone began his career as a stand-up comedian in 1991. He first performed at the Edinburgh Festival in 1996, in a tour controversially called, A Little Piece of Kike.

Stone later appeared on several television shows, including The 11 O'Clock Show, The Late Edition, Never Mind The Buzzcocks and Mock the Week.

In 2013 Stone began presenting 'Off the Ball' a weekly comedy football show on ESPN with Bob Mills. This format was transferred to BT Sport in time for the 2014 World Cup and renamed The Football's On.

Stone was also co-host on 'Rock and Roll Football' on Absolute Radio with Ian Wright for five years. The show won a Sony silver award for best sports programme in 2012.

Stone currently presents a regular weekday breakfast radio show from 6.30am until 10.30am on Love Sport Radio in London. He is also a regular contributor to the recently relaunched Arsenal F.C. podcast(AFTV), The Tuesday Club, alongside host Alan Davies and the Handbrake Off podcast for The Athletic.
