= Dane Baptiste =

British stand-up comedian and writer

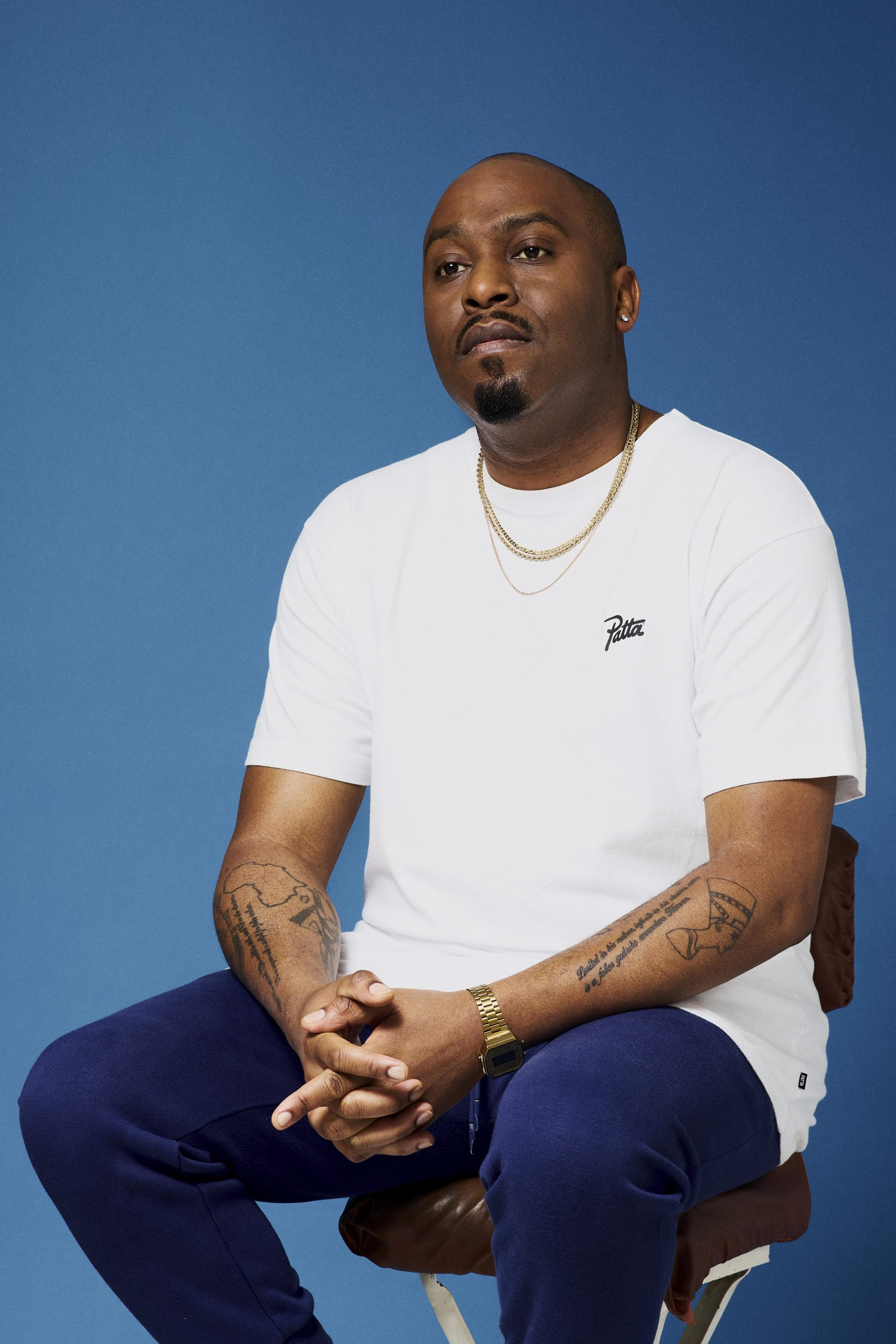
- Dane Baptiste, 2024
- Born: Hither Green, London, England
- Occupations: Stand-up comedian, writer, and presenter

Dane Baptiste (born 3 September 1981) is a British stand-up comedian, writer and presenter. He was the first Black British act to be nominated for the "Best Newcomer" award at 2014's Edinburgh Comedy Awards and his comedy series Sunny D premiered on BBC Three in Spring 2016. He has made numerous TV and radio appearances, and hosts his own podcast Dane Baptiste Questions Everything. In January 2021, Baptiste's comedy pilot Bamous launched on BBC Three / BBC One.

== Early life ==
Baptiste is from Hither Green, South East London. He attended Haberdashers' Hatcham College in New Cross, and then achieved a degree in business at Bradford University. He worked in media sales before becoming a comedian.

== Stand up career ==
Baptiste started performing stand-up comedy in 2012.

Baptiste was the first Black Briton to be nominated for the 2014 “Best Newcomer” Edinburgh Comedy Award. After the success of his debut stand up-show “Citizen Dane”, he completed two sold-out runs at London's Soho Theatre (with additional dates added to accommodate demand)

He was nominated for a Chortle award in 2015.

His second stand-up show “Reasonable Doubts” at the 2015 Edinburgh Fringe Festival, sold out and was met with critical acclaim with his first nationwide solo tour following in 2016.

In 2018, Baptiste set out on a world tour, including Australia and New Zealand, with his smash-hit stand-up hour G.O.D. (Gold. Oil. Drugs.) about the worldwide pursuit of wealth, power and pleasure.

In 2021, Baptiste launched a new show and international tour, The Chocolate Chip.

== Television career ==
Baptiste has made various television appearances on Sweat the Small Stuff, Virtually Famous, Celebrity Squares, Safeword, Live at the Apollo, Live from the BBC, Alan Davies: As Yet Untitled, Mock the Week, 8 Out of 10 Cats Does Countdown, Pants of Fire, Stand Up Sketch Show, Pointless, Comedy Central's Roast Battle, Comedians Giving Lectures, Comedians Solving World Problems, Gagging Order, Elevenish, CelebAbility, Black, British and Funny, Frankie Boyle's New World Order, and Alan Davies: As Yet Untitled.

He has hosted Live At The Apollo (BBC Two), Live from the Comedy Store (Comedy Central) and Tonight at the London Palladium (ITV1).

In December 2018 he won a week-long series in the BBC's Richard Osman's House of Games.

In 2016 Baptiste created, wrote and starred in sitcom Sunny D, which was then purchased for an American remake in 2018 by Lionsgate Pictures.

During the 2020 lockdown Baptiste performed on The Big Night In for Children in Need and Comic Relief.

In January 2021, Baptiste's BBC pilot Bamous premiered on BBC Three / BBC One.

== Writing career ==
In 2016 Baptiste wrote his first sitcom Sunny D which was the first commissioned pilot written by a Black British comedian on the BBC in 20 years.

In 2020, Baptiste created and wrote BBC pilot Bamous.

Baptiste hosted his own podcast Dane Baptiste Questions Everything, is a member of comedy collective Quotas Full and is currently working on numerous scripted projects for both the UK and US. He is now host of a new podcast Citizen Dane and co-host of the Mind Your Business podcast.

Baptiste wrote for Idris Elba at the 2018 FIFA Awards.

He has also appeared on other podcasts including Evil Genius with Russell Kane, West: Word - The Westworld podcast for Sky TV, Geoff Lloyd's Hometown Glory on Union Jack Radio, FRANK with Olivia Lee and Maria Shehat, The Gaffer Tapes: Fantasy Football Podcast, and Mo Money, Mo Problems with Mo Gilligan.

He has been a guest on several episodes of BBC Radio 4's Just A Minute and The News Quiz.

== Controversy ==
On 1 May 2024, Baptiste issued a statement on social media to an unnamed female comic, whom he described as a "Zionist" and a "dumb woman". Baptiste said he wanted the recipient of the message to "sit down with your husband and kids and imagine what their lives will be without you... I'll sit in prison while your family sit in the cemetery".

His post was condemned by other comedians while his agents, Gag Reflex and Insanity Group, dropped Baptiste the following day. Baptiste later described the post as "a massive error of judgment" and apologised to the Jewish community, colleagues and fans.
