= Foregone Conclusion =

Fictional rock band

Foregone Conclusion is a fictional rock band fronted by the comedian Ricky Gervais as his character David Brent from UK comedy television series The Office. The band's lineup consists of Brent/Gervais (vocals and rhythm guitar), Andy Burrows (of Razorlight) on drums, Steve Clarke (formerly DumDums) on bass, Stuart Wilkinson (formerly DumDums) on guitar, and Michael Clarke (formerly Clarksville) on keyboards.

== Background ==
Established as part of David Brent's backstory in The Office, Foregone Conclusion is a band he formed in Slough before he began his career in the paper industry. His ex-bandmates are identified as Reggie Mental, and Craig "Mammogram" Monkford. Brent was the lead singer/songwriter, and was credited with songs including "Spaceman Came Down", "The Serpent that Guards the Gates of Hell", "Free Love Freeway", "Paris Nights (Goodnight My Sweet Princess)" and political reggae song "Equality Street". Brent claims that Foregone Conclusion were once supported by "little-known Scottish outfit" Texas.

== Career ==
Gervais introduced the band in the film David Brent: Life on the Road, with the new lineup of Burrows, Steve and Michael Clarke, and Wilkinson as Monkford's nephew Stuart.

On 18 September 2013, it was announced on Gervais's Twitter that Foregone Conclusion would be reforming and appearing for two shows at the Bloomsbury Theatre, London, UK. Tickets went on sale on 1 October 2013, selling out in under one minute. This was followed in May 2014 by a UK tour, including two sold-out nights at Hammersmith Apollo.
