= David Brent =

Character from The Office

- First appearance: 'Downsize' (2001)
- Last appearance: David Brent: Life on the Road (2016)
- Created by: Ricky Gervais; Stephen Merchant
- Portrayed by: Ricky Gervais

In-universe information
- Occupation: General manager Travelling salesman Singer-songwriter
- Affiliation: Wernham Hogg; Foregone Conclusion
- Nationality: British

David Brent is a fictional character in the BBC television mockumentary The Office, portrayed by the show's co-creator, co-writer, and co-director Ricky Gervais. Brent is a white-collar office middle-manager and the principal character of the series. He is the general manager of the Slough branch of Wernham Hogg paper merchants and the boss of most other characters in the series. Much of the comedy of the series centres on Brent's many idiosyncrasies, hypocrisies, self-delusions, and overt self-promotion.

== Character ==
Gervais came up with the basic idea of Brent several years before The Office's debut in 2001. "David Brent was like a Frankenstein of all the people I'd met in my adult life. He was just a guy who wanted to be loved." Gervais based the filming format on reality-television series such as Airport. He had also worked in an office environment for almost ten years.

Brent is presented as an employer who wholeheartedly believes that his staff love him, whereas in fact, apart from Gareth Keenan, they actually resent him. In the Series 1 finale Brent betrays his staff by accepting a promotion to higher management, saving himself from the downsizing that will befall the Slough branch. Brent is later forced to turn the position down after failing a medical examination, but he insists to his staff that he failed it on purpose to save the branch.

Despite being the manager, Brent avoids confrontation. Brent's inability to stand up for himself or his staff often results in him lashing out at them, pointing out their weight or age if his own is brought to ridicule.

In the second series, Neil Godwin, manager of the Swindon branch, is given Brent's promotion. Neil is shown to be everything that Brent is not, which provokes Brent's insecurity and jealousy. Neil effortlessly bonds with Brent's staff and earns their trust, essentially going over Brent's head. Brent's dismissive attitude to key issues such as this culminates in a later confrontation with Neil and Jennifer when Brent fails to produce a report he promised to do.

When given an official warning, Brent recklessly challenges Neil in an effort motivated by his hurt pride, stating that his removal from managing the Slough branch would result in a staff uprising. This proves to be baseless and his staff are shown to be completely unconcerned and even relieved by the announcement that Brent will be made redundant.

Despite his unlikeable nature, Brent is shown as an increasingly tragic figure: a lonely man without any friends, goals or achievements who would rather please everybody around him even if it is met at his own expense.

In the Christmas special, Brent is working as a travelling salesman following his dismissal from Wernham Hogg, but he remains emotionally attached to his old workplace and constantly visits the office during working hours, eventually resulting in Neil banning him from the premises. He earns additional income on the side from Z-list celebrity appearances at various club nights trading on the minor fame the documentary series has given him, but he is frequently met with heckles and abuse from the crowds and gradually hits an emotional low.

He is allowed to attend the Wernham Hogg Christmas party that ends the special, at which he meets a blind date who genuinely enjoys his company and says she would go out with him again. In higher spirits, Brent is later shown bonding with his former colleagues and finally succeeds in making them laugh when they take a group photo together.

== Appearances outside The Office ==
In 2002, Gervais wrote an in-character piece for the BBC website on "what makes a winner" of the FA Cup. He said, "Managing a Premiership football team is a bit like running a successful paper merchant. There's a lot of similarities. I have to pick the right team, I have to lead by example, I have to instil trust and discipline."

In 2004, Gervais and Stephen Merchant, who co-created the show and the Brent character, recorded two videos for Microsoft in the UK entitled The Office Values, in which David Brent is brought in as a motivational speaker. In the videos, Brent repeatedly shows a deep hatred for Bill Gates, at one point calling him a litterbug. Brent plays a guitar song about the ills of technology versus the human condition, elaborates upon his desire for a comedy show (such as by impersonating Max Wall) and repeatedly makes fun of Jeff (Merchant's character), calling him a dweeb and a nerd for using the word "erroneous". This culminates in an appraisal in which Jeff repeatedly insults Brent, calling him an idiot, ill-informed, ill-educated and a shaved baboon in a suit, among others.

Intended as internal training videos, the two videos were leaked online in August 2006. Microsoft was reportedly unhappy about the leak.

At Wembley Stadium on 1 July 2007, Ricky Gervais performed as David Brent at the Concert for Diana. Alongside Mackenzie Crook as Gareth, Gervais performed a rendition of the song "Freelove Freeway" from episode four of The Office.

In 2009, Ricky Gervais appeared on Inside the Actors Studio, in which the host James Lipton asked if he could interview Gervais in character as David Brent for a brief period in the show. Gervais went on to perform a shortened version of the song "Freelove Freeway".

Brent made two brief appearances in the American version of The Office. In the season 7 episode "The Seminar", he meets his American counterpart Michael Scott (Steve Carell) while coming out of a lift Michael Scott is waiting for. Unsurprisingly, the two develop an instant rapport. David learns that Michael manages the Scranton branch of Dunder Mifflin, the paper company that is the equivalent of Wernham Hogg in the British series, and asks if there are any jobs available there, but is told there are no openings at the moment.

In the final episode of the same season, "Search Committee", Brent appears, via pre-recorded video résumé, as an interviewee for the Scranton manager's job, following Michael Scott's departure from the show several episodes earlier. Gervais also contributed to the script.

In March 2013, the BBC broadcast a mini-episode called "The Office Revisited" for Comic Relief 2013, a charity fund-raising event.

In August 2014, it was announced that Gervais would reprise the role of Brent for a film titled David Brent: Life on the Road, which features the character as he tours the UK with his band Foregone Conclusion. The film was released in August 2016.

In 2015, Gervais revived the character for his YouTube channel in the web series "Learn Guitar with David Brent." In each episode he plays the guitar, gives tips on how to play and answers fan questions. Among the songs he has played are "Freelove Freeway", "Spaceman", "Ooh La La" and "Life on the Road".

In August 2016, David Brent and Foregone Conclusion released the album Life on the Road. On 13 August 2016, Gervais appeared on the Dermot O'Leary show on BBC Radio 2 to publicise this album. Gervais was initially interviewed as himself and then after a short music interlude, O'Leary interviewed David Brent about the album release, and gave a stripped back acoustic session, playing the tracks "Life on the Road" and "Slough".

== See also ==
- Michael Scott – Brent's equivalent in the American version of The Office.
