= Jeff Marchelletta =

American actor, and film producer

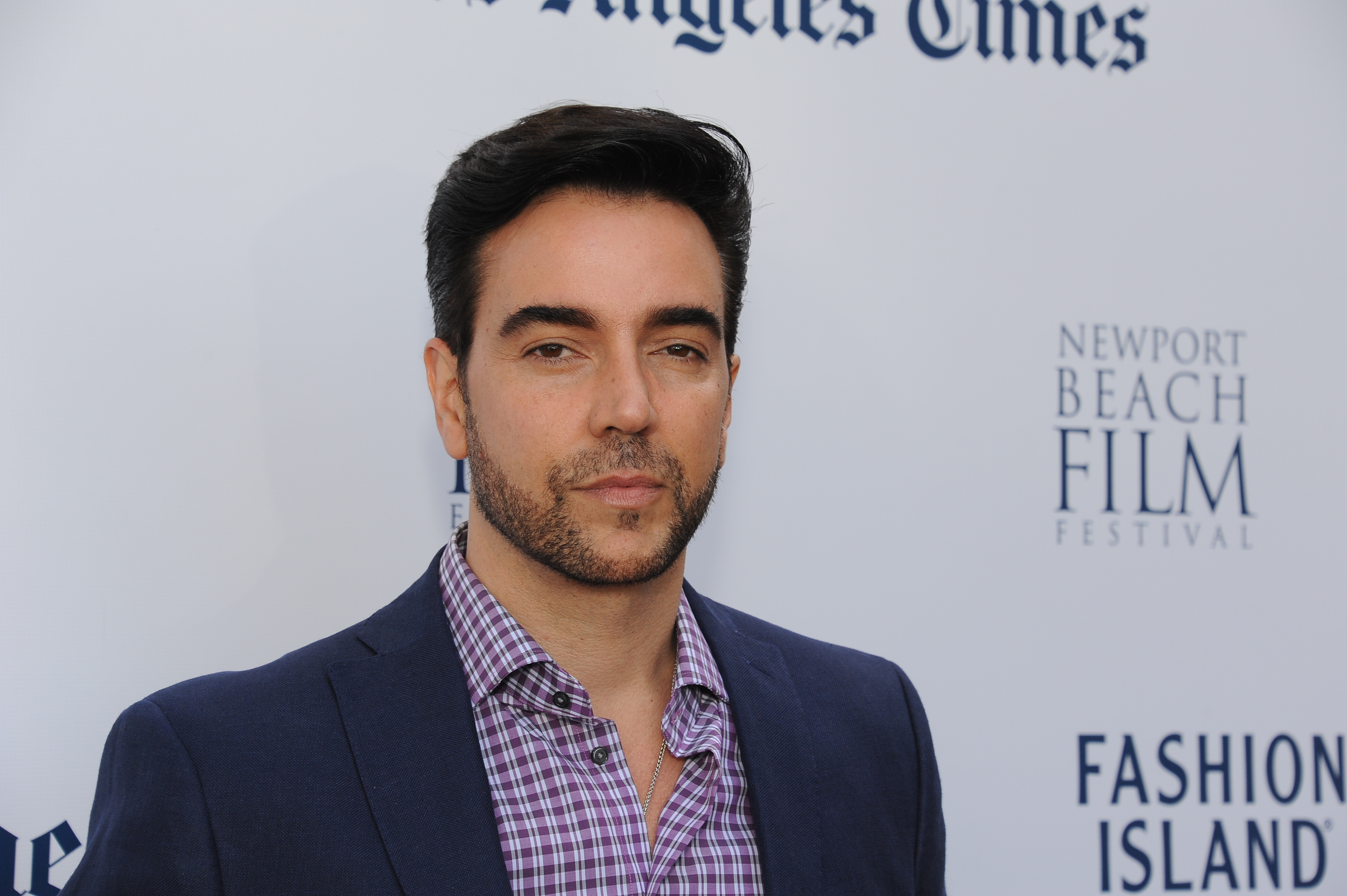
- Marchelletta at the 2014 Newport Beach Film Festival premiere of The Last Lonely Place
- Occupation: Actor/Producer
- Website: jeffmarchelletta.com

Jeff Marchelletta is an American actor, and film producer.

== Biography ==
Jeff Marchelletta was born and raised in Long Island, NY. Before becoming an actor, Marchelletta was an executive at one of the USA's largest building contractors. After a modeling stint with Gianni Versace Marchelletta studied acting in NYC and LA and landed his first acting role as a recurring character on the American soap opera All My Children.

In 2002, Marchelletta received a Best Actor Nomination at the 2002 Modesto Film Festival for the film Hollywood Vampyr. Marchelletta produced Ringers: Lord of the Fans. The documentary received a 2006 Saturn Award nomination, and won the "Outstanding Achievement Award in Filmmaking" award at the 2005 Newport Beach Film Festival.

== Filmography ==
=== Film ===
| Year | Film titles | Role |
|---|---|---|
| 2023 | A Mother's Intuition | Dr. Ken Zarada |
| 2022 | 8 Days To Hell | The Count |
| 2021 | Biased | Joffrey |
| 2021 | Robot Apocalypse AI takeover | Dr. Abel Lopez |
| 2020 | To The Flame | Steve |
| 2019 | The United States of Tomorrow | Father |
| 2018 | Duke | Joseph Peters |
| 2018 | Union | Doc Cobb |
| 2018 | The White Orchid | Tony |
| 2017 | Blindness | Charles Lockridge |
| 2017 | Forgotten Evil | Dr. Evan Michaels |
| 2016 | Domestic Seduction | Det. Hastings |
| 2014 | Such Good People | Ward Rodriguez-Levine |
| 2013 | This Last Lonely Place | Cameron Kane |
| 2007 | Out at the Wedding | DJ |
| 2006 | The Suicide | Officer Notolli |
| 2005 | 20 Minutes | Scott |
| 2004 | The Good Fight | Officer Steve Cooley |
| 2003 | Exorcism | Gene |
| 2003 | Mind Forest | Michael |
| 2002 | Hollywood Vampyr | Tom Weidder |
| 2002 | Demon's Kiss | Paul Hanley |
| 2001 | Supersleuth aka The Hillside Strangler | Kenneth Bianchi |
| 2000 | Betting the Game | Woody |

=== Television ===
| Year | Television Series | Episode | Role |
|---|---|---|---|
| 2022 | Roger Espionager | TV Pilot | Chester |
| 2019 | Unbelievable (miniseries) | Episode 6 | Westminster Police Chief Bilson |
| 2018 | Some Kind of Wonderful | TV Pilot | Tony Morretti |
| 2018 | Mohawk | Homecoming, Stuck in a Rut, Full Circle | Chad Walker |
| 2017 | Sinister Minister | TV movie | John Wells |
| 2017 | Forgotten Evil | TV movie | Dr. Evan Michaels |
| 2016 | BoysTown | Episodes 202, 203, 206 & 207 | Dr. Tim |
| 2014 | The Hotel Barclay | The Duo | Rich |
| 2014 | Drop Dead Diva | No Return | Tom Jessup |
| 2013 | A Snow Globe Christmas | TV movie | Mr. Jenkins |
| 2012 | Ringer | That Woman's Never Been a Victim Her Entire Life | NYPD Gerard |
| 2011 | Slanted | Paying Your Dues | Giulio Mancini |
| 2008 | Hannah Montana | Would I Lie to You, Lilly? | Steve Meyer |
| 2006 | Criminal Minds | The Fisher King: Part 2 | Robert Greenaway |
| 2005 | Las Vegas | Mothwoman | Travis Owens |
| 2004 | NYPD Blue | Bale Out | Officer Russo |
| 2002 | Nikki | My Two Left Feet | Antonio Cortez |
| 2000 | Courage | War Dogs | Frenchy Segool |
| 1999 | VS. | Episode dated Sept 5, 1999 | Brad the stockbroker |
| 1998 | All My Children | Unknown Episodes | Ryan's Guard / Cop |
| 1998 | Law & Order | Flight | Hazmat Technician #2 |

=== Producer ===
Without (film), 2011

Ringers: Lord of the Fans, 2005
