= The Ricky Gervais Show =

British comedy radio show

The Ricky Gervais Show was a comedy radio show in the United Kingdom starring Ricky Gervais, Stephen Merchant, and Karl Pilkington. Although named after Gervais, it came to revolve mostly around the life and ideas of Pilkington.

The trio began the show in August 2001 on London-based radio station XFM, and aired weekly, on Saturdays, for months at a time between August 2001 and July 2005. In November 2005, Guardian Unlimited offered the show as a podcast series of 12 shows. An animated series based on the podcast and adapted for television debuted for HBO in the United States and Channel 4 in the United Kingdom in 2010.

The podcast was one of the most successful shows in the early years of the podcast industry and received a "most downloaded podcast" certification from Guinness World Records in 2006. According to the BBC, by September 2006, the podcasts of the series had been downloaded nearly 18 million times. By March 2011, the podcast had been downloaded over 300 million times. A cult following for the XFM radio shows and podcasts has ensued in the following years since their original airings, maintaining a strong amount of fans.

== Radio shows ==
The Ricky Gervais Show
- Running time: 2 hours
- Country of origin: United Kingdom
- Language: English
- Home station: XFM
- Hosted by: Ricky Gervais (1998–2005); Stephen Merchant (1998–2005); Karl Pilkington (2001–2005)
- Recording studio: 30 Leicester Square, London
- Original release: January 1998 – July 2005

=== Series 0: Early shows as a duo (January–August 1998) ===
Ricky Gervais and Stephen Merchant first worked together in radio on the London-based alternative radio station XFM where Gervais was initially hired as the station's "head of speech" in 1997, soon hiring Merchant as his assistant in the same year.

Their show was broadcast from January to August 1998 from 4–6pm on Sundays, and only featured Gervais and Merchant (before their collaboration on The Office). The show's original format was more interactive, with features, guests, phone-ins, and audience interaction through listeners' letters.

Both Gervais and Merchant left the station later in 1998 following the takeover of XFM by the Capital Radio Group.

=== Series 1: Return to XFM (September 2001–May 2002) ===
Gervais and Merchant returned to XFM in September 2001, following the broadcast of the first series of The Office on BBC Two, with Karl Pilkington brought in as the show's producer. In a 2011 interview with The Independent, Pilkington said:

"Before I joined XFM, Ricky and Steve used to have a show playing music, with a bit of chat and swearing, and phoning up his mum. I remember thinking, how are they getting away with this? I got a job there after they left, in production, and a few years later, in 2001, my boss told me that these two blokes were back and it was my turn to produce them. The Office had been on, but I'd never watched it, so I was pretty nonplussed about it".

The show initially ran from September 2001 to May 2002 from 1–3pm on Saturdays before Gervais and Merchant went on hiatus to film the second series of The Office. Initially, Pilkington's on-air presence was relatively minimal with his presence not acknowledged on posters or other advertisements. Gervais and Merchant only occasionally called for him to weigh in with his thoughts, while the two mostly talked to each other, with the links between songs comprising only about thirty minutes of the show's two-hour run time.

As Pilkington's personality moved to the forefront, the talk portion of the show expanded to roughly an hour per two-hour broadcast, with the show relying largely upon a stream-of-consciousness format. In the same 2011 interview, Karl also said:

"By week three Ricky and Steve had started to involve me in the shows: he said, "Let's just chat like we do off air," and I started chipping in all the time".

At the end of Series 1, the trio won a bronze award at the 2002 Radio Academy Awards for the show.

=== Series 2: Longest stretch of shows (August 2002–August 2003) ===
With the second series of The Office complete, Gervais, Merchant, and Pilkington returned to the air on XFM in August 2002 to resume their 2-hour Saturday afternoon broadcasts. Though Pilkington's name was still not being used in promotional materials, the format mainly centered on his contributions with Gervais and Merchant reacting to his comments, a format that would endure through the remainder of the radio broadcasts and podcasts.

This was the longest stretch of XFM shows, running 51 weeks until August 2003 when Gervais and Merchant again went on hiatus, this time to record The Office Christmas specials.

During the year, Gervais and Merchant began saying on-air that Pilkington had become the star of the show and theorised that most listeners were tuning in to hear his anecdotes and perspectives. Pilkington, however, grew increasingly frustrated with Gervais's antagonism towards him, and over the final few shows, suggested that he did not wish to continue. Gervais and Merchant insisted they would not return if Pilkington did not agree to remain with the show.

=== Series 3: Pre-Extras (November 2003–January 2004) ===
During the hiatus, Pilkington signed on with Gervais and Merchant's talent agent, and negotiated a deal with XFM to get Mondays off in exchange for continuing to do the show on Saturdays. This was a frequent topic of contention during this run with Gervais repeatedly accusing Pilkington of being lazy for demanding an entire day off in exchange for producing the 2-hour Saturday afternoon broadcast.

The show began airing again in November 2003 and broadcast for 12 weeks until January 2004 when Gervais and Merchant went on hiatus to film the first series of their new show, Extras.

=== Series 4: Final series (May–July 2005) ===
Gervais, Merchant, and Pilkington returned to the air on XFM for the final time following the completion of the first series of Extras in May 2005. This time the trio stood in for Adam and Joe, recording only six shows before Gervais and Merchant left XFM for good in July 2005. The show would later continue as a podcast, with no further association with XFM.

=== Radio 2 Holiday Shows (December 2005) ===
Gervais, Merchant and Pilkington broadcast two hour-long holiday specials on BBC Radio 2 during the 2005 holiday season, the first airing on Christmas Eve and the second on New Year's Eve.

=== NME Radio show (June 2008) ===
Gervais, Merchant and Pilkington recorded a two-hour radio show as part of the test transmissions for the new radio station NME Radio. The episode aired on Monday 9 June 2008, 12–2pm.

== Podcasts and audiobooks ==
The Ricky Gervais Show
- Genre: Comedy
- Language: English

Creative team
- Created by: Ricky Gervais; Stephen Merchant; Karl Pilkington

Cast and voices
- Hosted by: Ricky Gervais; Stephen Merchant; Karl Pilkington

Publication
- No. of episodes: 46
- Original release: 5 December 2005 – 6 March 2011

Reception
- Ratings: 3.6/5

=== Creation ===
According to Emily Bell, editor-in-chief of Guardian Unlimited, Gervais and Merchant had approached The Guardian with the idea of the show. Bell said that they had switched to a podcast format for greater control over content and access to a larger audience. The first twelve episodes were released free of charge through the Guardian Unlimited website.

=== Series 1 (December 2005–February 2006) ===
The first series of podcasts began on 5 December 2005, and a new episode was released each Monday for the next twelve weeks. The show relies heavily on the wit and bizarre theories of Pilkington, who was then unemployed, having left his job as radio producer at XFM. The podcast focuses more on Pilkington as a primary figure of humour in the show in various ways, including questions directed at him that have been emailed in, either by fans of the show or by Gervais and Merchant themselves.

=== Series 2 (February–April 2006) ===
The second series of podcasts began on 28 February 2006. It consisted of six episodes with the final one released on 4 April 2006. The formerly free podcast shifted to a pay model and was available on Audible and iTunes as individual episodes. The reason for this addition, according to Ricky on the podcast, is because The Guardian had agreed to pay for the bandwidth for 12 episodes, and any further episodes would have to be paid for out of their personal finances.

=== Series 3 (August–September 2006) ===
The third series of podcasts began on 22 August 2006. The season had the same pricing implementation as season two, although the file quality was increased.

At the end of the sixth episode, Gervais and Merchant agreed to put the show on an indefinite hiatus.

=== Series 4: The Podfather Trilogy (October–December 2006) ===
Towards the end of 2006, three free podcasts were announced. The first was released on 31 October, to coincide with Halloween, the next was on 23 November, coinciding with Thanksgiving, and the last was released on 24 December, to coincide with Christmas.

=== Fame special (2007) ===
A special podcast was made available as a giveaway to people who went to see Gervais' stand-up tour Fame, which played from January to April 2007. It was later released for free to the public in October of the same year.

=== Hour-Long Bonus Podcast (November 2007) ===
On 25 November 2007, Gervais, Merchant and Pilkington released a free podcast. Originally released as an extra on the audio CD release of series 1, it was later made available free through iTunes.

=== Series 5 (September 2008) ===
Four more episodes were released on 15 September 2008 on iTunes. This series was released all at once as an Audiobook, almost two hours in length and split into four half-hour episodes. All episodes were recorded at the same time. There are no contests or any interaction from the listeners as the previous series contained.

=== The Ricky Gervais Guide to... (December 2008–March 2011) ===
==== Series 1 (December 2008–April 2009) ====
A new series, called The Ricky Gervais Guide to... featured the trio discussing various topics in their entirety during 50 minute episodes. The first volume The Ricky Gervais Guide to... Medicine was released on 31 December 2008. This was followed by The Ricky Gervais Guide to... Natural History on 21 January 2009. This in turn was followed by The Ricky Gervais Guide to... The Arts on 18 February 2009. The fourth episode, The Ricky Gervais Guide to... Philosophy aired on 17 March while the fifth and final episode of series 1, The Ricky Gervais Guide to... The English followed on 21 April (2 days prior to St. George's Day).

==== Series 2 (November 2009–March 2011) ====
The first episode of the second series, The Ricky Gervais Guide to... Society, was recorded on 6 September 2009, and released on 3 November 2009. The second episode, The Ricky Gervais Guide to... Law and Order, was released on 1 December 2009. A third entitled The Ricky Gervais Guide to... The Future, was released on 29 December 2009. The fourth, The Ricky Gervais Guide to... The Human Body was released on 26 January 2010. The fifth and final of the second season, The Ricky Gervais Guide to... The Earth was released on 23 February 2010.

On 12 June 2010, a special episode titled, The Ricky Gervais Guide to... The World Cup released to coincide with the 2010 FIFA World Cup.

The Ricky Gervais Guide to... Comic Relief was released as a free podcast on 6 March 2011 in aid of Red Nose Day 2011.

=== A Day in the Life of Karl ===
A special one-off podcast titled A Day in the Life of Karl was released on 28 October 2010.

=== Video podcasts ===
On 24 March 2006, an "irregular run of free video podcasts" was launched through the iTunes podcast directory. The video podcasts do not follow the format of the earlier audio shows and the content varies greatly from podcast to podcast. The first video was a conversation between Pilkington and Gervais, with Gervais enthusing about the idea of Pilkington becoming a human crab or having massive reconstructive surgery. The second podcast served as an advertisement for Pilkington and Gervais's new book, The World of Karl Pilkington (a series of excerpts from the previous podcasts and various musings and drawings produced by Karl). The third on the series was an audio clip from a previous edition of Monkey News, synchronised with a flash animation. The fourth video podcast features a controversial audio advertisement for The Prostate Cancer Charity and Gervais talking about his Aerial Award. The fifth is Gervais and Merchant making Pilkington watch Brokeback Mountain. The sixth podcast was another conversation over Pilkington's book The World of Karl Pilkington. The seventh podcast was about a story Pilkington told in series one, episode one, about his bizarre journey in an abandoned asylum and rehabilitation clinic. The eighth video shows Gervais showing the viewer around the various sets during the filming of the second series of Extras, followed by Pilkington giving his opinion on Gervais's latest book, Flanimals of the Deep. The ninth was Pilkington talking about Gervais's cat; Ollie. The tenth was Gervais, Merchant and Pilkington announcing the new series of the show beginning on 22 August.

In August 2012, Gervais produced a pilot for a new series of video podcasts, titled Learn English with Ricky Gervais. The show features Gervais and Pilkington engaging in English dialogue, and translated captions have been provided in many languages by their fans.

== TV series ==
The Ricky Gervais Show audiobooks were developed into The Ricky Gervais Show, an animated series which premiered on 19 February 2010 on HBO in the United States, and on 23 April 2010 on Channel 4 in the United Kingdom.

The show consists of past audiobooks with animation, drawn in a style similar to classic era Hanna-Barbera cartoons, describing jokes in a literal context. Three series of thirteen episodes each aired between 19 February 2010 and 13 July 2012.
