= Mentalist (disambiguation) =

A mentalist is a performing artist or practitioner who simulates psychic abilities.

Mentalist may refer to:

- Mentalism (psychology), a term for the study of mental perception and thought processes
- The concept of mentalism in artificial intelligence, related to consciousness and mental state
- British derogatory slang used to call a person insane, referring to a diminished state of cognition
- The Mentalist, an American television series starring Simon Baker
- The Mentalists, an English drama by Richard Bean

== See also ==
- Mentalism (disambiguation)
