= Stirling Gallacher =

English actress

- Born: Deborah Ann Stirling Gallacher; 30 November 1970 (age 55); Bowdon, Cheshire, England
- Education: Arts Educational Schools
- Occupation: Actress
- Years active: 1996–present
- Television: Doctors; Coronation Street; Casualty
- Spouses: William Ely (divorced) Seán Gleeson (m. 2009)
- Children: 2
- Awards: British Soap Award for Best On-Screen Partnership

Deborah Ann Stirling Gallacher (born 30 November 1970) is an English actress. She appeared in the BBC soap opera Doctors as George Woodson for six years, which earnt her numerous nominations at the British Soap Awards. Gallacher's other notable roles include Jennifer Taylor-Clarke in the BBC comedy The Office, Paula Martin in the ITV soap opera Coronation Street and Ffion Morgan in the BBC medical drama Casualty.

== Early and personal life ==
Deborah Ann Stirling Gallacher was born on 30 November 1970. She was born and raised in Bowdon, Cheshire. Gallacher gave birth to her first son in January 2004. On 20 June 2009, she married her Doctors co-star and on-screen husband, Seán Gleeson. That same year, Gallacher had another child with Gleeson, who has two other children from a relationship prior to Gallacher.

== Career ==
After minor appearances in films and television series, Gallacher booked a regular role in Meet Ricky Gervais on Channel 4 in 2000. A year later, she was booked in a main role on the BBC sitcom The Office, co-created by Gervais. At the time, Gallacher was working in an IT job for the BBC, who allowed her to continue her office job while simultaneously appearing on the series. Then in 2003, she appeared in Gervais' film Animals. Later that year, Gallacher was cast as George Woodson in the BBC soap opera Doctors, a role she stayed in until 2009. In 2007, she received the accolade for Best On-Screen Partnership at the British Soap Awards alongside Gleeson, who played her husband, Ronnie Woodson. Also from 2003 to 2005, she appeared in Little Britain in various different roles.

In 2017, Gallacher appeared in three episodes of the BBC soap opera EastEnders, portraying the Mayor of Walford, as well as appearing in an episode of the Tracy Beaker spin-off series The Dumping Ground. Gallacher joined the cast of Coronation Street in August 2018 as Paula Martin, a love interest for established character Sophie Webster (Brooke Vincent). In February 2020, it was announced that Gallacher had joined medical drama Casualty as police officer Ffion Morgan, the wife of established character Jan Jenning (Di Botcher). Gallacher confirmed that she would not leave Coronation Street for the new role, but instead would appear in both shows simultaneously. Gallacher made her Casualty debut on 18 July 2020. For her role as Ffion, Gallacher stated that she wanted to appear different to her Coronation Street character, so she wears a wig due to having an allergy to hair dye.

== Filmography ==
Year	Title	Role	Notes
1996, 1999	The Knock	Air Stewardess / Angela Dixon	Recurring role
1997	One Sunday Morning	Newsreader	Short film
1997	London's Burning	Frances	1 episode
2000	Meet Ricky Gervais	Ricky's Producer	Main role
2001–2003	The Office	Jennifer Taylor-Clark	Main role
2001, 2012, 2014	Casualty	Various	3 episodes
2003	Footballer's Wives	Rowena Brookes	Episode: "Go for the Overkill"
2003	Animals	Partner	Film
2003	Comic Relief: The Big Hair Do	Juliet	Blankety Blank segment
2003–2005	Little Britain	Various	Main roles
2003–2009	Doctors	George Woodson	Regular role
2006	Alpha Male	Dr. Bullmore	Film
2008	Small Things	Dr Sophia Norton	Short film
2010	Decade of Doctors	Herself	Interviewed guest
2010	Holby City	Kate Moyles	Guest role
2012	Trollied	Customer Stirling	1 episode
2013	Father Brown	Emily Bennett	Episode: "The Devil's Dust"
2013	Everybody's Going to Die	Jackie	Film
2017	The High Window	Vivian	Film
2017	Midsomer Murders	Cleo Langton	Episode: "Red in Tooth & Claw"
2017	Emmerdale	Defence Barrister	Recurring role
2017	EastEnders	Mayor of Walford	Guest role
2017	The Dumping Ground	Mimi Blunt	Episode: "The Phantom of Ashdene Ridge"
2017–2020	Enterprice	Cynthia	Main role
2018	Holby City	Elizabeth Cartwright	Episode: "No Matter Where You Go, There You Are - Part One"
2018	The Festival	Vivian Taylor	Film
2018	Doctor Who: The Monthly Adventures	Isobel (voice)	Episode: "The Dispossessed"
2018–2020	Coronation Street	Paula Martin	Regular role
2019	White Gold	Patricia Brown	Recurring role
2020–2023	Casualty	Ffion Morgan	Recurring role
2025	One Night in Bath	Catherine	Film

== Awards and nominations ==
Year	Ceremony	Category	Nominated work	Result	Ref.
2005	British Soap Awards	Sexiest Female	Doctors	Nominated	
2006	British Soap Awards	Best Actress	Doctors	Nominated	
2006	British Soap Awards	Best Dramatic Performance	Doctors	Nominated	
2006	British Soap Awards	Sexiest Female	Doctors	Nominated	
2007	British Soap Awards	Best Actress	Doctors	Nominated	
2007	British Soap Awards	Best On-Screen Partnership (with Seán Gleeson)	Doctors	Won	
2007	British Soap Awards	Sexiest Female	Doctors	Nominated	
2008	British Soap Awards	Best Actress	Doctors	Nominated	
2008	British Soap Awards	Sexiest Female	Doctors	Nominated	
