= The World of Karl Pilkington =

2006 book by Karl Pilkington

- First edition
- Author: Karl Pilkington, Stephen Merchant & Ricky Gervais
- Illustrator: Karl Pilkington
- Language: English
- Subject: Memoir
- Genre: Non-fiction
- Publisher: Fourth Estate
- Publication date: 2006
- Publication place: United Kingdom
- Media type: Print (Hardback)
- Pages: 192 pp
- ISBN: 978-1-4013-0342-6
- OCLC: 75551019
- Followed by: Happyslapped by a Jellyfish

The World of Karl Pilkington is the first book written and illustrated by Karl Pilkington, and contains transcripts from The Ricky Gervais Show podcasts and excerpts from his own diary, as well as drawings and some original material illustrated by Pilkington himself. It was published and released in 2006. As stated on The Ricky Gervais Show, Karl put a lot of work into the book and had been illustrating the drawings featured in the book for a considerable amount of time.

== Development ==
As part of The Ricky Gervais Show radio program, host Karl Pilkington began a diary during a vacation to Grand Canaria, which Gervais read on-air for listeners. Ricky Gervais and co-host Stephen Merchant would encourage Pilkington to continue writing, leading to readings of excerpts of the diary becoming a recurring feature: as they often highlighted Pilkington's eccentric worldview, with entries interspersing Pilkington's daily activities with retellings of various anecdotes from his life.

Karl's Diary would prove to be popular amongst listeners, leading Pilkington to combine his ambition to write a book with the existing popularity of the segment.
