= Ricky Gervais: Humanity =

2018 stand-up comedy special

- Directed by: John L. Spencer
- Written by: Ricky Gervais
- Produced by: Charlie Hanson
- Starring: Ricky Gervais
- Edited by: Jon Blow
- Music by: Andy Burrows
- Production company: Derek Productions Limited
- Distributed by: Netflix
- Release date: 13 March 2018
- Running time: 79 minutes
- Country: United Kingdom
- Language: English

Ricky Gervais: Humanity is a stand-up comedy tour written and performed by British comedian Ricky Gervais. It was filmed in Hammersmith Apollo and released by the streaming service Netflix.

== Contents ==
The show addresses several subjects including the decision to not have children, comedy and offense taking, Caitlyn Jenner, social media and animal rights.

== Reception ==
Brian Logan of The Guardian gave the special a positive review calling it Gervais's best standup show so far and saying that "even the liberal-baiting is more nuanced". Lucy Mangan of The Guardian gave the special a mixed review, stating that it is a "much better, less fragmented, more controlled show" than Gervais' previous stand-up show Science and that it is "such a pleasure to watch Gervais work". She went on however to criticise Gervais' Caitlyn Jenner routine, stating that it is "the content [of the show], as ever, that divides critical and personal opinion" and that "[Gervais] can anatomise other people’s hypocrisy but refuses to turn attention to his own". The Telegraph gave the show a positive review, saying that it provided "a timely reconfirmation of [Gervais'] rare aptitude as a breeze-shooter: a winning combination of straight-talking pub philosopher, wind-up merchant and incorrigible class-clown". UK comedy website Chortle said that the show is "[Gervais'] most mature yet, not by sacrificing crassness, but by giving it context" and that "where this would once have been unadulterated boorishness coming from Gervais’s mouth, there’s a little more playfulness now – and a smudge of Stewart Lee-style sarcastic repetition"
