= Karl Pilkington =

English comedian and television personality (born 1972)

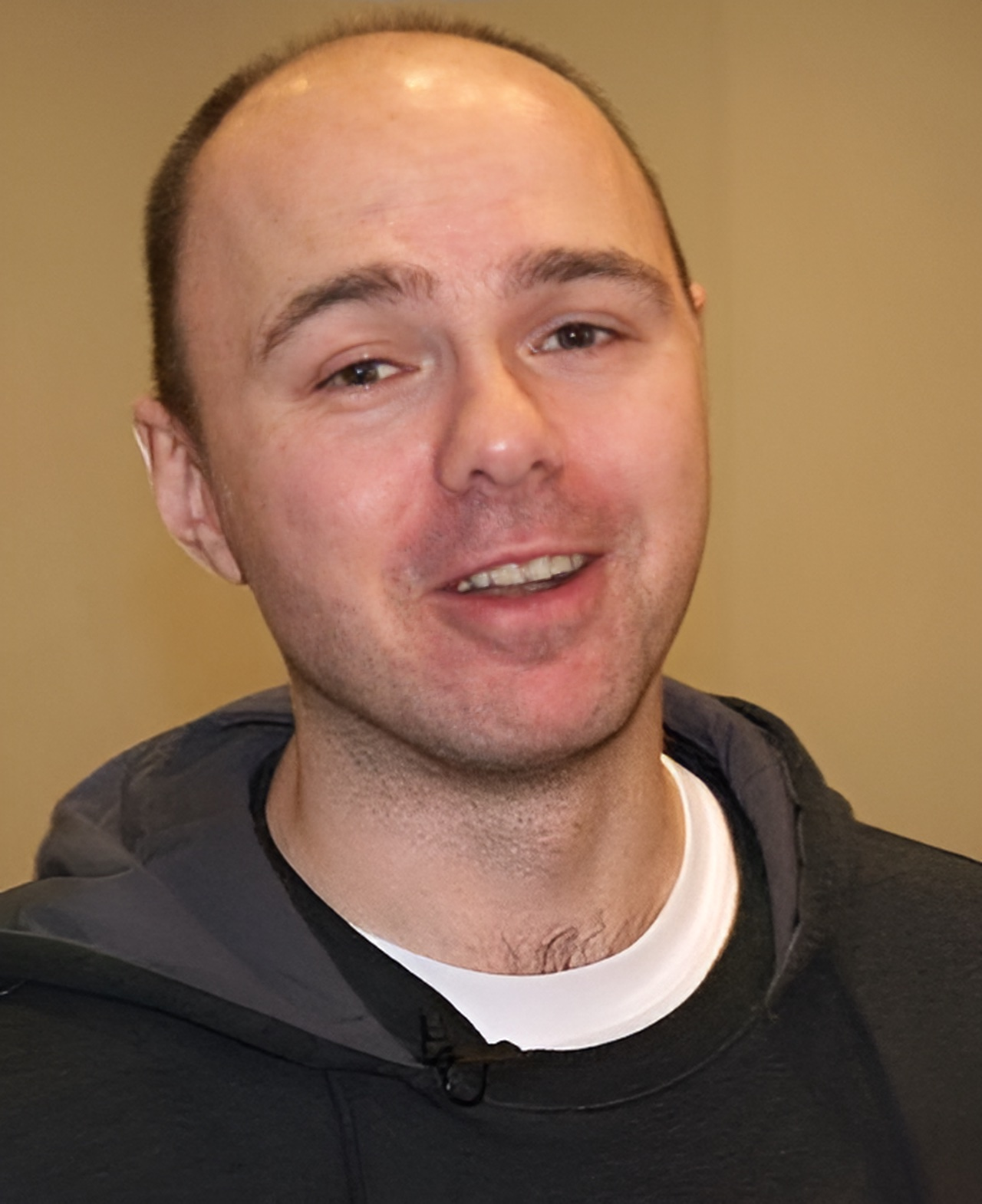
- Pilkington in 2008
- Born: 23 September 1972 (age 54); Sale, Cheshire, England
- Occupations: Presenter; comedian; actor; voice-artist; producer; author
- Years active: 1998–present
- Partner: Suzanne
- Website: karlpilkington.co.uk

Karl Pilkington (born 23 September 1972) is an English presenter, comedian, actor, author, and former radio producer. He first became widely known through his work with Ricky Gervais and Stephen Merchant on The Ricky Gervais Show. Originally the programme's producer at XFM, Pilkington gradually became an on-air contributor and then a main presenter, with his unconventional observations and worldview becoming a prominent part of the programme.

Pilkington later established a television career, starring in the Sky One travel series An Idiot Abroad from 2010 to 2012 and The Moaning of Life from 2013 to 2015. He made his acting debut in the comedy-drama series Derek in 2012, and later co-wrote and starred in the sitcom Sick of It from 2018 to 2020. His subsequent acting work has included roles in The Thief, His Wife and the Canoe, Rain Dogs, and Ludwig. He has also written several books, including works associated with his travel programmes.

== Early life and education ==
Pilkington was born on 23 September 1972 in Sale, Cheshire (now part of Greater Manchester) to Alan and Dorothy Pilkington. He grew up in the Racecourse Estate in Sale, and has an elder sister and brother, Mark (1962-2017) and Jackie.

He was never close to his siblings, which he attributed to being 10 years younger than them; he once said that it had been "years" since he had last talked to them. He attended Ashton-on-Mersey School in Sale. He said that he never liked school and struggled with the system, at some point losing all interest in it.

He has said he attended school only to sell items to his schoolmates, usually video games that he had purchased and made copies of. He said, "I wasn't going to school to learn, I was going to earn." At the age of 15, he dropped out of school to work as a cassette and disk printer through a Youth Training Scheme programme.

== Career ==
=== 2001–2005: Early work ===
Pilkington moved to London to work as a producer at XFM, where he was later promoted to head of production. While there, he caused Gail Porter to leave the station in tears after only one show after criticising her performance, which Pilkington defended as an attempt to encourage improvement.

After several years, he began work on The Ricky Gervais Show. Initially, Pilkington was solely the programme's producer and rarely spoke on air, but as Gervais and Merchant began to frequently invite him to make cameo appearances, Pilkington's eccentric personality and unconventional views came to prominence and his popularity increased. He was eventually included as a main presenter on the broadcasts, with large amounts of airtime devoted to his controversial opinions on various subjects: often due to his misunderstanding of the stories.

Pilkington created many features for the broadcasts, including Monkey News, a segment in which Karl recounted various news stories surrounding chimpanzees or monkeys (who he refers to interchangeably, regardless of species); Rockbusters, a show in which listeners are able to call in to guess bands or artists based on cryptic clues; Educating Ricky, in which Pilkington attempted to educate Gervais about the world, and many others. Rockbusters garnered the most attention, with regular emails being sent to the station by listeners in the hope of winning a prize. These prizes were often mundane and low quality and were often referred to as things Pilkington "picked up from around the office". In December 2005, Pilkington stood in on two BBC Radio 6 Music shows for Nemone, co-presenting with Russell Brand.

=== 2005–2019: Celebrity ===
Pilkington's presence on The Ricky Gervais Show podcasts significantly increased his fame. He has often been mentioned in interviews given by Gervais and is often the victim of Gervais's pranks and insults directed towards the spherical appearance of his bald head, which has often been compared to an orange. During the podcast, Pilkington would often discuss his bizarre upbringing and worldview, alongside absurd news stories.

In describing a challenge from I'm a Celebrity...Get Me Out of Here! in which contestants consumed a kangaroo penis, Pilkington claimed the challenge was more difficult than presented due to contestants' consuming of the kangaroo penis on an empty stomach. Pilkington reasoned that he could perform the challenge should it occur later in the day, surmising "I could eat a knob at night". In response to Pilkington's claim, Gervais encouraged his listeners to sample the humorous sound bite and remix it into dance music. The phrase spawned several dance music mixes, T-shirts and other merchandise. Many of Pilkington's quotes have since gained publicity, particularly on the Internet. Reuters described Pilkington as a "phenomenon" who had made "Internet history".

On 23 November 2010, while appearing live on Richard Bacon's Radio 5 Live afternoon show, Gervais surprised Pilkington with an on-air phone call. This led to a conversation in which Pilkington, who claimed to have been interrupted while grouting his kitchen, claimed that he had not yet been paid for his work on An Idiot Abroad and concluded the interview with an improvised link into the hourly news.

Pilkington has worked independently of Gervais and Merchant on several projects. He appeared as a guest on the shows Flipside TV and The Culture Show, and appeared in several short films as part of the Channel 4 project 3 Minute Wonders.

Merchant and Gervais have repeatedly denied claims that Pilkington's persona is their creation. In an on-air response to similar claims made by Chris Campling during a broadcast on Xfm, Merchant stated that he would be "ashamed" if the radio show had been scripted, adding that "I would not have squandered a character that good on this poxy radio station." Gervais concurred, pointing out that writing a single series's worth of six half-hour episodes of shows such as The Office and Extras consumed as long as a full year of their time. An interviewer for The Daily Telegraph concluded that Pilkington's behaviour is genuine.

In 2019, a species of velvet ant from the family Mutillidae was named Traumatomutilla pilkingtoni after a recurring gag on the Ricky Gervais Show, in which Gervais would compare the rounded shape of Pilkington's head to an orange.

=== 2004–present: Television and DVD ===
Pilkington appeared in an interview titled Meet Karl Pilkington on Gervais's live standup comedy DVD Politics (2004). The DVD of Gervais's film The Invention of Lying (2009) contains a special feature also called Meet Karl Pilkington that documents his participation in the film as a non-speaking caveman in another special feature, The Dawn of Lying. He was given a small role in the final episode of Extras.

In September 2010, Pilkington starred in An Idiot Abroad, a light-hearted Sky One travel documentary series produced by Gervais and Merchant in which he visits the New 7 Wonders of the World while participating in various activities along the way. The destinations Pilkington visits throughout the series include the Taj Mahal, the Great Wall of China, the Dead Sea and Jerusalem’s old city and the Great Pyramids of Giza. He wrote a book to accompany the series.

The second series, subtitled The Bucket List, debuted on 23 September 2011 on Sky One and features Pilkington partaking in ultimate experiences from a list selected for him. In June 2011, he won the Best Presenter award for An Idiot Abroad at the Factual Entertainment Awards. The third series of the show, An Idiot Abroad: The Short Way Round, premiered in November 2012 and showed Pilkington and Warwick Davis travelling the Marco Polo route.

Pilkington made his acting debut on 12 April 2012 in the Channel 4 comedy-drama Derek, portraying caretaker and bus driver Dougie. He left the show after the first episode of the second series. From 2013 to 2015, he starred in a two-series Sky One documentary called The Moaning of Life. From 2018 to 2020, he co-wrote and starred in a Sky One scripted sitcom called Sick of It.

In 2022, Pilkington starred in the ITV drama The Thief, His Wife and the Canoe as DC Phil Bayley. He has also performed voice-over work for clients Sky TV, One Stop Office Shop, Freeview, Vodafone, HMV, PlayStation Portable, WHSmith, Wickes, Unilever and SMARTY.

In 2023, Pilkington appeared in the comedy-drama series Rain Dogs. In 2024 and 2026, he guest starred in the BBC detective dramedy Ludwig.

== Personal life ==
Pilkington resides in Sandbanks, Poole, Dorset. He is in a long-term cohabiting relationship with his partner, Suzanne, whom he frequently mentions in his work.

Pilkington supported Manchester City as a child, but has supported Manchester United since the 1990s. In January 2020, he revealed on Sunday Brunch that he had been attempting to eat fewer animal products and described himself as a flexitarian.

Regarding his experience of other religions during the production of An Idiot Abroad, Pilkington noted that "Religion was never a big part of my life. I wasn't christened." Nevertheless, he commented that "I've always thought of myself as sort of a Buddhist."

=== Charity work ===
In 2014, Pilkington designed and signed his own card for the Thomas Coram Foundation for Children charity. The campaign was launched by crafting company Stampin' Up! UK; his card, along with those designed and signed by other celebrities, was auctioned on eBay in May 2014.

== Filmography ==
=== Film ===
Key
†	Denotes films that have not yet been released

Year	Title	Role	Notes
2009	The Invention of Lying	Caveman	Cameo, cut from final release
2010	Cemetery Junction	Extra	
2012	Chingari	English Reporter	
2026	Bury Your Nephew	Toby	Short film
2026	Merry Christmas Aubrey Flint	Colin Barrow	

=== Television ===
Year	Title	Role	Notes
2003	Flipside TV	Himself	
2006	3 Minute Wonder	Himself	Segment: "Some Thoughts by Karl Pilkington"
2007	Comedy Lab	Himself	Episode: "Karl Pilkington: Satisfied Fool"
2007	Extras	Autograph Hunter	1 episode; "2007 Christmas Special"
2007	Monkey Lovers (documentary)	Himself	Voice
2010–2012	The Ricky Gervais Show	Himself	Voice
2010–2012	An Idiot Abroad	Himself	21 episodes
2012–2014	Derek	Dougie	8 episodes
2013–2015	The Moaning of Life	Himself	11 episodes
2018–2020	Sick of It	Karl	12 episodes; also creator and writer
2022	The Thief, His Wife and the Canoe	DC Phil Bayley	2 episodes
2023	Rain Dogs	Simon	2 episodes; series 1 episodes 7 & 8
2024, 2026	Ludwig	DI Matt Neville	Series 1 and 2 guest
2026	Smarty Mobile advert	Himself	Voice

=== Radio ===
Year	Title	Role
2001–2011	The Ricky Gervais Show	Himself

== Bibliography ==
Year	Title	ISBN
2006	The World of Karl Pilkington	978-0007240272
2007	Happyslapped by a Jellyfish	978-1405328470
2008	Karlology: What I've Learnt So Far	978-1405333351
2010	An Idiot Abroad: The Travel Diaries of Karl Pilkington	978-1847679260
2012	The Further Adventures of An Idiot Abroad	978-0857867490
2013	The Moaning of Life: The Worldly Wisdom of Karl Pilkington	978-1782111511
2016	More Moaning: The Enlightened One Returns	978-1782117315
