= Bitter Heart =

1983 single by Seona Dancing

Single by Seona Dancing
- Released: September 1983
- Genre: New wave, synthpop
- Length: 3:58 (7"), 6:36 (12")
- Label: London Records
- Songwriters: Ricky Gervais, Bill Macrae
- Producer: Phil Thornalley

Seona Dancing singles chronology
"More to Lose" (1983)	"Bitter Heart" (1983)

"Bitter Heart" is a song by British new wave duo Seona Dancing, released as a single in 1983. It is a David Bowie-style new wave pop song, sung by a then-unknown Ricky Gervais with synthesizers provided by Bill Macrae. The song peaked at No. 79 on the UK Singles Chart, and remained in the top 100 for 3 weeks.

== Music video ==
A video was made in 1983. It has had considerable play in recent years on talk shows interviewing Gervais and has been played on "'80s flashback" shows. The plot of the video is a girl in a wedding dress who was about to get married and has just had her husband leave her, after which she becomes angry and destroys most of the objects in the room.

== Cover versions ==
In August 2012, British band Super 8 Cynics released a cover of the song through Manchester record label Longevity Records. In September 2023, Los Angeles band Sacred Skin released a cover of the song via Artoffact Records.
