= Golden Years (Comedy Lab) =

- Comedy Lab episode
- Gervais in character impersonating David Bowie
- Episode no.: Series 2 Episode 6
- Directed by: Blake Bedford
- Written by: Ricky Gervais; Stephen Merchant
- Cinematography by: Alastair Meux
- Editing by: Richard Halladey
- Original air date: 8 September 1999
- Running time: 23 minutes

Episode chronology
← Previous "Vent"	Next → "The Entertainer"

"Golden Years" is the sixth episode of the second series of the British comedy anthology series Comedy Lab. It first aired on 8 September 1999 on Channel 4. Written by Ricky Gervais and Stephen Merchant, it stars Gervais as the co-owner of a video rental company who has a David Bowie obsession. The episode follows him as he prepares for his appearance on the talent show Stars In Their Eyes.

== Production ==
"Golden Years" is filmed in a mockumentary style. Certain scenes feature "talking head" interview segments with Gervais's character, interviewed by Merchant off-screen, which is a format similar to that used in The Office.

== Plot ==
Gervais plays Clive Meadows, the main character who has a David Bowie obsession. Clive Meadows is the 32 (or 37, he is somewhat unclear) year old co-owner of 'Video Zone', a video rental company based in Reading. The show follows Clive as he prepares for his appearance on the ITV talent show Stars In Their Eyes.

== Reception ==
Vulture's Ramsey Ess wrote that the episode is "mostly uneven" in its humour, feeling like a demo tape for Gervais and Merchant's later series, The Office. Ess noted that Gervais's character has no redeeming qualities, which makes sympathising with him when he reaches his lowest point a difficult task. He concluded by writing that, "Without this show, there probably wouldn’t have been an Office, so in that regard, it’s a good thing that it was made. But beyond that, Golden Years offers only the spark of what Gervais and Merchant would create together."

== Legacy ==
The documentary style of the show and in particular the behaviour of Gervais's character present like prototypes for The Office and its lead character David Brent.
