= More Flanimals =

Book by Ricky Gervais

- More Flanimals book cover
- Author: Ricky Gervais
- Illustrator: Rob Steen
- Cover artist: Rob Steen
- Language: English
- Series: Flanimals Series
- Subject: Creatures
- Genre: Humour
- Publisher: Faber and Faber
- Publication date: 2005
- Publication place: England
- ISBN: 0-399-24605-3
- OCLC: 61864048
- LC Class: PZ7.G3265 Mor 2006
- Preceded by: Flanimals
- Followed by: Flanimals of the Deep

More Flanimals is the sequel to Ricky Gervais' book Flanimals.

Like Flanimals, the book features around 30 species of Flanimal, illustrated by Rob Steen, which make up their own imaginary ecosystem.

Some notable Flanimals in this book include the Squat, the Psquirm and the Mung Ungler.

== List of Flanimals ==
- Skwunt – a clam-like Flanimal with its eyes inside its mouth.
- Plappavom – a Flanimal resembling scrambled eggs that dissolves over time.
- Fud Dumpton – a heavily built dopey looking Flanimal.
- Grommomulunt – a caterpillar-like creature with no organs other than a pair of eyes. It is the larval stage of the Munt Fly; the metamorphosis consists of shedding its skin and eyes, causing its insides to leak into the ground.
- Horosi Horasi – the fastest and smallest Flanimal on the planet.
- Edgor – the slowest moving Flanimal on the planet that has been overtaken by some dead flanimals.
- Dweezle Muzzbug – a grasshopper-like Flanimal that sheds its legs.
- Verminal Psquirm and Hordery Psquirm – two supposedly similar Flanimals that are seen only peeping round corners; their body shapes remain unknown.
- Squat – an aggressive spider-like Flanimal.
- Mung Ungler – a bovine-like Flanimal with many udders.
- Pong Flibber – a balloon-like Flanimal that escapes by pumping out its entire gaseous insides.
- Weezy Tong Nambler – an irritating Flanimal whose only defences are to flap and lick.
- Prug Fuggell – a testroprod and snail.
- Gronglet – a trunked Flanimal that cannot find enough food so dies within its first day of its life.
- Spleg – related to the Gronglet but can survive until the day after its birth.
- Swog Monglet – a primitive lazy pond dweller that pulled itself out of the swamps millions of years ago.
- Gumbnumbly Knunk Knunk – not explicitly described in the book, but features in a story at the end; apparently it can read thoughts.
- Plodonklopus – an ancient strain of Blunging that was stronger and faster, but nonetheless became extinct.
- Splorn - a microscopic organism that later gave rise to all the other Flanimals.

Many other Flanimals are shown on an evolutionary tree but not described:

- Klut - a simple life form similar to a pear.
- Skrag Valve - a slug-like Flanimal that evolved from the Klut.
- Gernloid - an orange Flanimal resembling an anthropomorphic frog that is related to the Psquirms.
- Austrillo Ployb - a small, pink Flanimal that is related to all members of the Ployb family.
- Nurdler Ployb - a scrawny, orange Flanimal that is related to the Print.
- Squabulo Ployb - a Flanimal similar to a Hemel Sprot with arms.
- Grebulond - a green Flanimal with four legs and a long thin nose. It is the ancestor of the Edgor.
- Wig Scrambler- a light blue, centipede-like Flanimal that is the ancestor of the Dweezle Muzzbug.
- Drub Mipe – a minuscule, brown, spider-like Flanimal with no mouth. It is the ancestor of the Horosi-Horasi and the Squat.
- Scrabs – a round, blue Flanimal with spikes on its head.
- Muffid Skrunt – a yellow, spider-like flanimal with a vicious expression.
- Progulant Glob – a lime-green blobby Flanimal that is the ancestor to many Flanimal Vertebrates.
- Nub Sprunt - a small, purple Flanimal that is related to the Flemping Bunt-Himmler.
- Ung Noglet - a small, blue frog-like flanimal that is related to the Grundit.
- Gundulump - a Flanimal resembling a legged version of the Plamglotis. It has a tongue that sticks out and its eyes seem to be close to its tongue.
- Anker - a large, round Flanimal with a small face.
