= Meet Ricky Gervais =

British television comedy talk show

- Genre: Talk show Comedy
- Written by: Ricky Gervais; Jimmy Carr; Robin Ince; Stephen Merchant
- Directed by: Ian Lorimer
- Presented by: Ricky Gervais
- Country of origin: United Kingdom
- Original language: English
- No. of seasons: 1
- No. of episodes: 6

Production
- Executive producer: Peter Fincham
- Producer: Iain Morris
- Running time: 30 minutes (inc. adverts)
- Production company: Talkback

Original release
- Network: Channel 4
- Release: 22 September – 27 October 2000

Meet Ricky Gervais is a British television comedy talk show written and hosted by Ricky Gervais. It was produced by Talkback for Channel 4 in 2000 and ran for one series on Friday nights. It ran for a total of six episodes.

== Overview ==
Guests were supposedly interviewed by Gervais in the original television studio chairs of famous people. Gervais was seated in Michael Aspel's Aspel & Co leather chair and guests seated in Ronnie Corbett's monologue chair, and Grandad from Only Fools and Horses' armchair. Each episode has two celebrity guests, and following the interview segments Gervais would host his version of a classic television panel game, with the guests as contestants.

The show regularly featured darts assistant Tony Green, who would take his place as the general stooge and gameshow assistant. On the first episode, Gervais joked that Green came free with the original Bullseye dartboard, which he supposedly found himself whilst building the rest of the set.

Also, the show did not have a theme tune so at the end of each show, Gervais asked viewers to record and send in their own mixes. Few were received. Two of the episodes used a theme tune co-written and performed by Stewart Ferris and Emma Burgess.

== Episodes ==
1. Tommy Walsh and Jimmy Savile. After interviewing each guest separately, Gervais hosts a game of Call My Bluff in which Walsh and Savile are the contestants.
2. John Virgo and Michael Winner. The guests play Family Fortunes.
3. Penny Smith and Tony Hart. The guests play Play Your Cards Right.
4. Wayne Hemingway and Paul Daniels. The guests play Every Second Counts.
5. Peter Purves and Stefanie Powers. The guests play Child's Play, with dwarves taking the roles of children.
6. Antony Worrall Thompson and Midge Ure. The guests play The Krypton Factor.

== Production notes ==
The series was produced by Iain Morris and co-written by Jimmy Carr and Robin Ince with additional material provided by Stephen Merchant and Stirling Gallacher (VT clock voiceover).

== Reception ==
Gervais admits that this show was an embarrassment and it has since been mocked even by Gervais himself. He was quoted as saying that there was no second series as Channel 4 wanted to see some changes, "ratings mainly". Commenting on the difficulties of securing guests Gervais stated that "either they'd heard of me or they hadn't. Either way it was a problem".
