= Seona Dancing =

1980s British new wave group

- Origin: London, England
- Genres: New wave; synthpop
- Years active: 1982–1984
- Label: London Records
- Past members: Ricky Gervais; Bill Macrae

Seona Dancing (/ˈʃɔːnə/, SHAW-nə) were a 1980s British new wave group, best known for providing comedian Ricky Gervais with his first experiences as a public performer. Although the band experienced little chart success in their home country, their single "More to Lose" went on to become a teen anthem in the Philippines.

== History ==
While studying at University College London, Ricky Gervais and his friend Bill Macrae formed Seona Dancing, with Macrae writing the music and playing keyboards, and Gervais writing and singing the lyrics. After recording a sixteen-song demo tape, they were signed by London Records, which released two of their singles: "More to Lose" and "Bitter Heart". In June 1983, the duo performed their single "More to Lose" on the ITV-syndicated children's television show Razzmatazz. Yet, despite the promotion of "Bitter Heart" through its music video and "More to Lose" by its TV performance, both singles failed to break the top 40, with "More to Lose" charting at number 117 and "Bitter Heart" at number 79 on the UK Singles Chart. After the lacklustre performance of their two singles, the band split up in 1984. Gervais went on to have a successful international career as a comedian and actor.

When Jimmy Kimmel asked about Macrae in a 2014 interview, Gervais answered, "I hope he got fat, too."

== Popularity in the Philippines ==
In 1985, DWRT-FM (then known as 99.5 RT, now 99.5 Play FM), a radio station in Metro Manila, Philippines, started playing a song billed as "Fade" by Medium (also billed as "Medium" by Fade). DWRT-FM deliberately misnamed the artist and song title to prevent anyone from finding the record and playing it themselves. Additionally, to stop other radio stations from recording it and playing it, DWRT-FM inserted a station ID midway through the track. A year later, another radio station, DWXB-102, revealed the true identity of the song as "More to Lose" by Seona Dancing.

The song, which utilises an opening piano riff to convey the sound of falling teardrops, became a major radio and club hit as well as a favourite at high-school dances during the 1980s and beyond. AllMusic critic Michael Sutton wrote that the track was "the theme song of angst-ridden New Wave youths in the Philippines" and "an '80s anthem as ubiquitous as Peter Gabriel's 'In Your Eyes', but with the eternal hipster cool of Joy Division's 'Love Will Tear Us Apart'."

== Discography ==
- 1983: "More to Lose" b/w "You're on My Side" (7", 12" single) – UK No. 117
- 1983: "Bitter Heart" b/w "Tell Her" (7", 12") – UK No. 79

An unofficial CD compiling of all of the band's songs (apart from the 7" versions of "Bitter Heart" and "Tell Her"), titled More to Lose, was released in 2005.
