= Fame (2007 film) =

Video by Ricky Gervais
- Released: 12 November 2007
- Recorded: Hammersmith Apollo, London, United Kingdom
- Genre: Stand-up comedy
- Length: 79 minutes
- Label: Universal Pictures

Ricky Gervais chronology
Politics (2004)	Fame (2007)	Science (2010)

Fame is a performance by British comedian Ricky Gervais, filmed at the Hammersmith Apollo, London, United Kingdom, in 2007.

== Description ==
British Comedy Guide described Fame as tackling "the weird world of fame, blurring the line between the acceptable and the outrageous, with a balancing act that had audiences across the country laughing in what was the fastest-selling live comedy tour in UK history."
