= Rob Steen =

- Born: England
- Occupations: Illustrator, guitarist
- Known for: Book illustration
- Website: https://www.rob-steen.com/

Rob Steen is an English illustrator and guitarist, best known for the books Flanimals, More Flanimals, Flanimals of the Deep, Flanimals: The Day of the Bletchling and Flanimals Pop-Up. His other works include Erf and The Pod. He previously played guitar in the bands Presence and Babacar and in August 2023 released the album Zephyr.
