= Flanimals =

Childrens book series by Ricky Gervais

- Flanimals book cover
- Author: Ricky Gervais
- Illustrator: Rob Steen
- Cover artist: Rob Steen
- Language: English
- Series: Flanimals Series
- Subject: Creatures
- Genre: Humour
- Publisher: Faber and Faber
- Publication date: 2004
- Publication place: England
- ISBN: 0-399-24397-6
- OCLC: 57311839
- Dewey Decimal: [Fic] 22
- LC Class: PZ7.G3265 Fl 2005
- Followed by: More Flanimals United States and The Holy Bible

Flanimals is a book series written by comedian Ricky Gervais and illustrated by Rob Steen. It depicts an assortment of seemingly useless or inadequate fictional animals and their behaviour.

The cover Flanimal is the Grundit. The book is published by Faber and Faber, which has also published the sequels More Flanimals, Flanimals of the Deep and Flanimals: The Day of the Bletchling. Flanimals: Pop Up was published October 2009 by Walker Books in the UK and in March 2010 by Candlewick Press in the US.

== List of Flanimals ==
- Coddleflop: A green mush puddle that absorbs substances and flips over to protect its soft top. However, since its bottom is equally soft, this strategy is never successful.
- Plamglotis: A purple ape-like Flanimal with no legs so it swallows its hands to walk around to find food, which it cannot eat because its mouth is full.
- Mernimbler: A fluffy, pink, round Flanimal that feeds on honey water and soft cloud bits. It transforms into an aggressive, ogre-like adult stage when someone comments on its cuteness. They devour everything and die of chronic indigestion.
- Grundit: A heavily built blue Flanimal with a bump on its head from falling off Puddloflaj. Their small brain protects them though. They bully Gum Spudlets and squash Cuddleflop.
- Puddloflaj: A pink water balloon-like Flanimal often ridden by Grundits for no clear reason. They are very cowardly as their eyes will pop out. It is almost 100% water and can be used as water balloons when young.
- Flemping Bunt-Himmler: A mimic and predator of the baby Mernimbler, only wider and flatter. They often get eaten after the Mernimblers grow up.
- Underblenge: A grey, blobby Flanimal that cannot move from where it was born due to it having extremely strong suction cups (designed for suffocating prey) on its underside.
- Blunging: A yellow dinosaur-like Flanimal that lives in large family groups. They hate seeing their young being devoured by Adult Mernimblers.
- Munty Flumple: A brown humanoid Flanimal that stares and falls in love with every Flanimal it sees. They are apparently the cutest creatures as babies.
- Splunge: A brain-like Flanimal so terrified of everything that it "splunges" at birth, which causes both parents to do so.
- Honk: A small, pink, tapir-like Flanimal that sleeps all day until it randomly wakes up to make a loud honking sound from its nose and then goes back to sleep.
- Hemel Sprot: A green blobby Flanimal that always looks where it has been and never where it is going.
- Sprot Guzzlor: A large blue Flanimal that preys on Hemel Sprots.
- Clunge Ambler: An ape-like Flanimal that hugs everything it sees. It always gets buried and pops back up to hug the Flanimal that buried it.
- Wobboid Mump: A blind eye in jelly that spends its entire life looking for the reason for its existence.
- Sprine Bloat-Trunker: An orange Flanimal that erupts from Sprog and Hemel Sprot recycling plants, and immediately joins the queue to be recycled.
- Print: A humanoid Flanimal that dives off high places but always lands on its head. It dies from ankle sprains and strong wind.
- Gum Spudlet: A Flanimal that resembles a Bumpy Coddleflop, and is eaten by Grundits. They are dipped in Coddleflop by Grundit.
- Sprog: A small, vicious, beetroot-like Flanimal that is angry at its own smell. It’s often chewed and spat out by Grundit.
- Munge Fuddler: A crab-like Flanimal that "fuddles" everything it sees, until it fuddles the wrong thing.
- Frappled Humpdumbler: An octopus-like Flanimal with an eye on one side of its head and a nose on the other.
- Offledermis: A Flanimal born inside out to escape its own smell. It has a heart above its inside out eyeballs and constantly leaks.
- Plumboid Doppler: A round green Flanimal with eyestalks.
- Blimble Sprent: A yellow, fast-moving Flanimal without arms that sprints everywhere, avoiding its destination until it dies of exhaustion at the very spot where it started.
- Glonk: A small green Flanimal that does absolutely nothing then dies.
- Burple Meepnorp: A kidney stone like creature which completes an oddly specific action, illegal in an oddly specific place, and dies of embarrassment after it is caught.
- Glorple Glingus: A peculiarly shaped light brown thing. Often shapeshifts into the punchline of the joke. Reminiscent of Boaz Kidd in its personality and mannerisms.

== Originality dispute ==
In August 2010, Norwich-based writer and artist John Savage issued a High Court writ, claiming that the original Flanimals book was based on his own Captain Pottie's Wildlife Encyclopedia, and that his artistic and literary copyright had been infringed. A spokeswoman for Gervais said that the concept and illustrations existed before Savage's work.

== Adaptations ==
ITV commissioned a television series based on the books, with a planned air date of 2009, but it was later cancelled.

On 28 April 2009, Variety reported that an animated feature film was in production at Illumination Entertainment, known for its 2010 summer blockbuster Despicable Me. It said that Gervais would be the executive producer and would voice the lead character, and that The Simpsons writer Matt Selman would write the script. However, it has since been removed from the development schedule, leaving its future uncertain, and no further details have been released about it since 2009.
