= More to Lose =

Single by Seona Dancing
- Released: April 1983
- Genre: New wave, synth-pop
- Length: 3:48
- Label: London Records
- Songwriter(s): Ricky Gervais; Bill Macrae
- Producer(s): Mike Thorne

Seona Dancing singles chronology
"More to Lose" (1983)	"Bitter Heart" (1983)

"More to Lose" is the debut single by English new wave duo Seona Dancing, released in 1983. It is an uptempo new wave pop song, sung by a then-unknown Ricky Gervais, who was the lyricist and vocalist of the band. Bill Macrae was the band's composer and keyboard player. The song remains virtually unknown in their homeland of the United Kingdom, after only peaking at No. 117 on the UK Singles Chart, but found tremendous success in the Philippines in 1985, a year after the band broke up.

== Success in the Philippines ==
In 1985, DWRT-FM started playing the song, deliberately misnaming it as "Fade" by Medium (also billed as "Medium" by Fade), to prevent other rival stations finding the song and playing it for themselves. To make it impossible for other DJs to record the song and play it on their own station, DWRT-FM even inserted a station ID midway through the track. A year later, radio station DWXB-102 revealed the true identity of the song. "More to Lose" became an instant hit among Filipino teenagers. The song also swept the nation's dance clubs and received endless airplay on Manila FM stations throughout the mid-1980s.
