= Ricky Gervais =

English comedian (born 1961)

- Gervais in 2021
- Born: Ricky Dene Gervais; 25 June 1961 (age 65); Reading, Berkshire, England
- Education: University College London (BA)
- Partner: Jane Fallon (1982–present)

Comedy career
- Years active: 1982–present
- Medium: Stand-up; television; film; music; books
- Genres: Observational comedy; dark comedy; comedy music; musical comedy; satire
- Subjects: Everyday life; pop culture; alcoholism; religion; human nature; social awkwardness; current events; human sexuality
- Ricky Gervais's voice Recorded June 2007 from the BBC Radio 4 programme Desert Island Discs
- Website: rickygervais.com

Ricky Dene Gervais (/dʒərˈveɪz/ jər-VAYZ; born 25 June 1961) is an English comedian, actor, writer, producer and director. He co-created, co-wrote, and starred in the British television sitcoms The Office (2001–2003), Extras (2005–2007), and Life's Too Short (2011–2013) with Stephen Merchant. He also created, wrote, and starred in Derek (2012–2014), After Life (2019–2022) and Alley Cats (2026). Gervais was also executive producer of and had cameos in the American rendition of The Office (2005–2013).

Gervais has received various accolades including seven British Academy Television Awards, five National Comedy Awards, five Golden Globe Awards, two Primetime Emmy Awards, a Satellite Award and the Rose d'Or twice (2006 and 2019). In 2003, The Observer named Gervais one of the 50 funniest performers in British comedy. In 2007, he was placed at No. 11 on Channel 4's 100 Greatest Stand-Ups, and at No. 3 in their 2010 list. In 2010, he was included in the Time 100 list of World's Most Influential People.

Gervais initially worked in the music industry. He attempted a career as a pop star in the 1980s as the singer of the new-wave act Seona Dancing, who were successful in the Philippines with the song "More to Lose", but were dropped by their label, London Records, following their second single, "Bitter Heart", due to a lack of success in the UK singles chart. He also managed the then-unknown band Suede before turning to comedy in the mid-late 1990s. He appeared on The 11 O'Clock Show on Channel 4 between 1998 and 2000, garnering a reputation as an outspoken and sharp-witted social provocateur. In 2000, he was given a Channel 4 spoof talk show, Meet Ricky Gervais. He achieved greater mainstream fame the following year with his BBC television mock documentary series The Office, followed by Extras in 2005. He also wrote the Flanimals book series.

Gervais began his stand-up career in the late 1990s. He has performed five multi-national stand-up comedy tours. Gervais, Stephen Merchant and Karl Pilkington created the podcast The Ricky Gervais Show, which has spawned various spin-offs including An Idiot Abroad (2010–2012), starring Pilkington and produced by Gervais and Merchant. In 2016, he wrote, directed and starred in the comedy film David Brent: Life on the Road. Gervais has also starred in the Hollywood films For Your Consideration (2006), the Night at the Museum film series trilogy (2006–2014), Ghost Town (2008), and Muppets Most Wanted (2014). He wrote, directed, and starred in the 2009 romantic comedy film The Invention of Lying and the 2016 Netflix-released comedy film Special Correspondents. He hosted the Golden Globe Awards five times, in 2010, 2011, 2012, 2016, and 2020.

== Early life and education ==
Gervais was born on 25 June 1961 at Battle Hospital in Reading, Berkshire. Gervais's father was Lawrence Raymond "Jerry" Gervais (1919–2002), a Franco-Ontarian of French Canadian descent who grew up on a farm in Pain Court, Ontario near Chatham. Lawrence immigrated to the UK while on foreign duty during the Second World War. He worked as a labourer and hod carrier before he met Gervais's English mother, Eva Sophia (née House; 1925–2000). They met during a blackout, settled in Whitley, Reading, and had four children. Eva died at age 74 of lung cancer. Ricky was the youngest child; his siblings are: schoolteacher Larry (1945–2019), Marsha, a teacher for special needs children (born 1948), and Bob (born 1950), a painter and decorator. Prompted by Bob, Ricky Gervais began to question the existence of God from about age eight.

Gervais has mentioned in interviews that, as an 11-year-old, he asked why his siblings were so much older than he was; his mother bluntly told him that he "was a mistake". Gervais has spoken of his appreciation for his family's extreme sense of humour. He told BBC Radio 4's Desert Island Discs that he and his brother Bob spent most of their mother's funeral "crying with laughter". They had been asked by the vicar to tell him something about their mother prior to the service, with Gervais saying, "My brother, just winding up the vicar, said, 'She was a keen racist.' And the vicar said, 'I can't say that!' So Bob went, 'Oh, OK then... she liked gardening.'"

Gervais attended Whitley Park Infants and Junior Schools and received his secondary education at Ashmead Comprehensive School. After a gap year, which he spent working as a gardener at the University of Reading, he attended University College London (UCL) in 1980. He intended to study biology but changed to philosophy after two weeks, and was awarded a lower-second class honours degree in the subject from UCL in 1983. During his time there, he met Jane Fallon, with whom he has been in a relationship since 1982.

== Career ==
=== Music ===
For six months in 1983, during his final year as a student at UCL, Gervais and his best friend Bill Macrae formed the new wave pop duo Seona Dancing. They were signed by London Records, which released two of their singles—"More to Lose" and "Bitter Heart". The songs failed to make an impact on the UK Singles Chart. Despite not being successful in the UK, Seona Dancing did manage to score a hit in the Philippines with "More to Lose". Gervais also worked as the manager for Suede before they became successful in the 1990s.

In 2013, Gervais performed a live tour as David Brent along with his band Foregone Conclusion, Brent's fictional band in The Office. He and the band performed songs written under the Brent character, including "Equality Street" and "Free Love Freeway". Gervais also produced a series of YouTube videos, 'Learn Guitar with David Brent', featuring acoustic guitar versions of nine songs. In 2016, as part of the Life on the Road film promotion, Gervais published the David Brent Songbook of 15 songs, which he also recorded for the album Life on the Road as David Brent and Foregone Conclusion.

=== Radio ===
Gervais worked as an assistant events manager for the University of London Union (ULU), then was head of speech at the alternative radio station Xfm. Needing an assistant, he interviewed the first person whose curriculum vitae he read: Stephen Merchant. In 1998 Gervais's position was made redundant when the station was taken over by the Capital Radio group. Around this time he was also a regular contributor to Mary Anne Hobbs's Radio 1 show, performing vox pop interviews in unlikely locations.

After the first series of The Office, Gervais and Merchant returned to Xfm in November 2001 for a Saturday radio show, where they began working with Karl Pilkington, who produced the shows and later collaborated with them on their series of podcasts. In October 2017, Gervais began hosting the weekly radio show Ricky Gervais Is Deadly Sirius on SiriusXM, which ran until 2019.

==== Podcast ====
On 5 December 2005, Guardian Unlimited began offering free weekly podcasts, including The Ricky Gervais Show featuring Gervais, Merchant and Karl Pilkington. Throughout January and February 2006 the podcast was consistently ranked the number 1 podcast in the world. It appeared in the 2007 edition of the Guinness Book of World Records as the world's most-downloaded podcast, with an average 261,670 downloads per episode during its first month. Two more series, each with six podcasts, were released between February and September 2006.

In late 2006, three more free podcasts were released. Together called "The Podfather Trilogy", they debuted individually at Halloween, Thanksgiving and Christmas. These three were known by Gervais and Merchant as "The Fourth Season". In October 2007 another free full-length podcast was released through iTunes, after being originally given out for free during a performance of Gervais's Fame stand-up tour in London. On 25 November 2007 Gervais, Merchant and Pilkington released another free podcast of just over one hour.

In August 2008, Gervais, Merchant and Pilkington recorded their fifth series of audiobooks with four chapters released on 16 September 2008, and described as the Guide To... series. There are 12 'Guides' to Medicine, Natural History, Arts, Philosophy, The English, Society, Law & Order, The Future, The Human Body, The Earth, The World Cup 2010 and Comic Relief. The conversations typically begin on topic and go out on tangents about other subjects. In 2021, Gervais launched a paid-for audio series, Absolutely Mental, of his conversations with philosopher Sam Harris. Season 2 was also launched in 2021, followed by season 3 in March 2022.

=== Television ===
==== Early television appearances ====
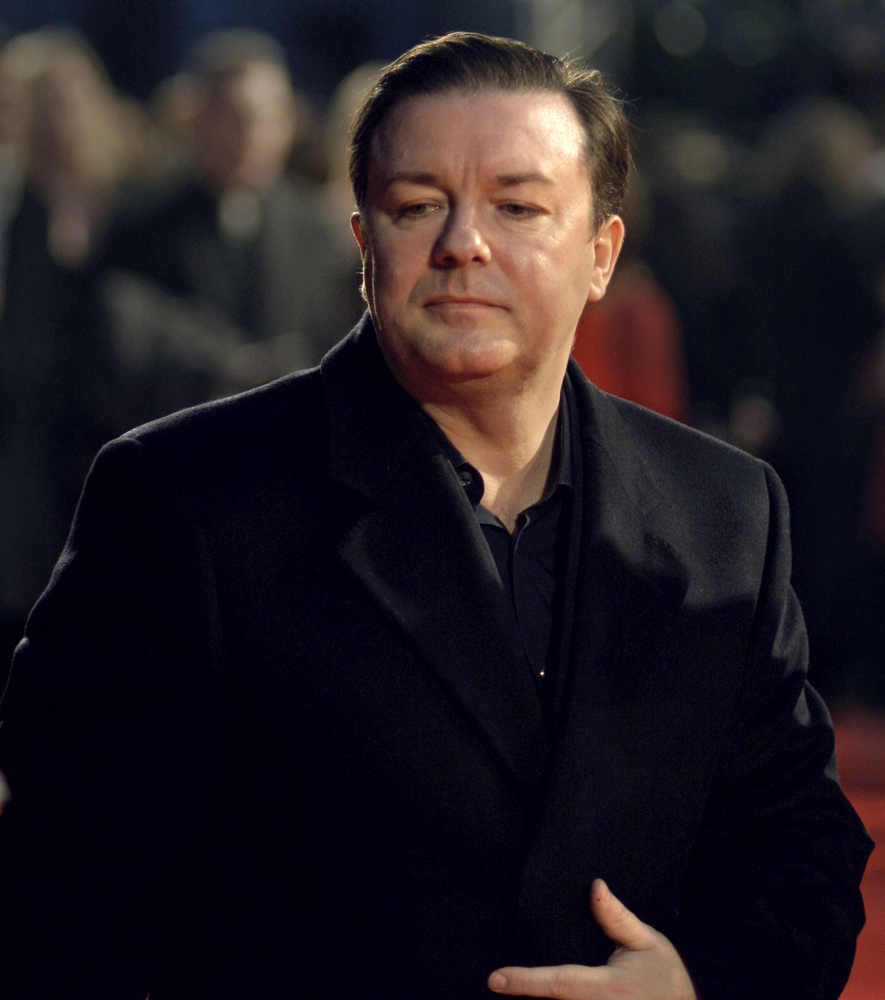
Gervais at the 60th British Academy Film Awards in 2007

Gervais has contributed to the BAFTA-winning The Sketch Show (ITV), penning several sketches. His mainstream-TV on-screen debut came in September 1998 as part of Channel 4's Comedy Lab series of pilots. His one-off show Golden Years focused on a David Bowie-obsessed character called Clive Meadows.

Gervais then came to much wider national attention with an obnoxious, cutting persona featured in a topical slot that replaced Ali G's segments on the satirical Channel 4 comedy programme The 11 O'Clock Show in early 1999, in which his character used as many expletives as was possible and produced an inordinate number of politically incorrect statements. Among the other regular featured comedians on the show was Mackenzie Crook, later a co-star of The Office. Two years later, Gervais went on to present his comedy chat show for Channel 4 called Meet Ricky Gervais, which was poorly received and cancelled after six episodes, and Gervais has since mocked it. Throughout this time, Gervais also wrote for the BBC sketch show Bruiser and The Jim Tavare Show.

==== The Office ====
The Office started when Stephen Merchant had to make his short film while on a BBC production course. In August 1999 he made a docu-soap parody, set in an office, with help from Ash Atalla who was shown a 7-minute video called 'The Seedy Boss'. Thus the character of David Brent was created. Merchant passed this tape on to the BBC's Head of Entertainment Paul Jackson at the Edinburgh Fringe, who then passed it on to Head of Comedy Jon Plowman, who eventually commissioned a full-pilot script from Merchant and Gervais.

The first six-episode series of The Office aired in the UK in July and August 2001 to little fanfare or attention. Word-of-mouth, repeats and DVDs helped spread the word, building up momentum and anticipation for the second series, also comprising six episodes. Following the success of The Office's second series, Gervais was named the most powerful person in TV comedy by Radio Times. In 2004, The Office won the Golden Globe Award for Best Television Series – Musical or Comedy as well as Best Actor – Television Series Musical or Comedy for Gervais, who said in a 2015 BBC interview that the award was the gateway to America for him.

The Office brand has since been remade for audiences in Sweden, France, Germany, Quebec, Brazil, Chile, Czech Republic, Finland, India, Israel, Poland and the United States. Gervais and Merchant are producers of the American version, and they also co-wrote the episode "The Convict" for the show's third season. Gervais has said that the episode "Training" is his favourite, where Brent plays his guitar and sings. In 2021, on the show's 20th anniversary, he suggested the show would not have been produced in 2021 due to cancel culture: "I mean, now it would be cancelled. I'm looking forward to when they pick out one thing and try to cancel it. Someone said they might try to cancel it one day, and I say, 'Good let them cancel it—I've been paid!'" In 2025, Gervais became an executive producer on The Paper, a spinoff of the American version of The Office created by Greg Daniels, who had also created the American adaptation of The Office.

==== Extras ====
Extras had its debut on the BBC on 21 July 2005; directed by Ricky Gervais and Stephen Merchant, the sitcom ran for twelve episodes and starred Gervais as Andy Millman, a background artist. Millman is more self-aware and intentionally humorous than Gervais's The Office character David Brent. Guest stars on the first series of Extras include Ross Kemp, Les Dennis, Patrick Stewart, Vinnie Jones, Samuel L. Jackson, Ben Stiller, Kate Winslet and Francesca Martinez. A second series began on 14 September 2006 in the UK and featured appearances by Daniel Radcliffe, Dame Diana Rigg, Orlando Bloom, Sir Ian McKellen, Chris Martin, Keith Chegwin, Robert Lindsay, Warwick Davis, Ronnie Corbett, Stephen Fry, Richard Briers, Patricia Potter, Sophia Myles, Moira Stuart, David Bowie, Robert De Niro and Jonathan Ross.

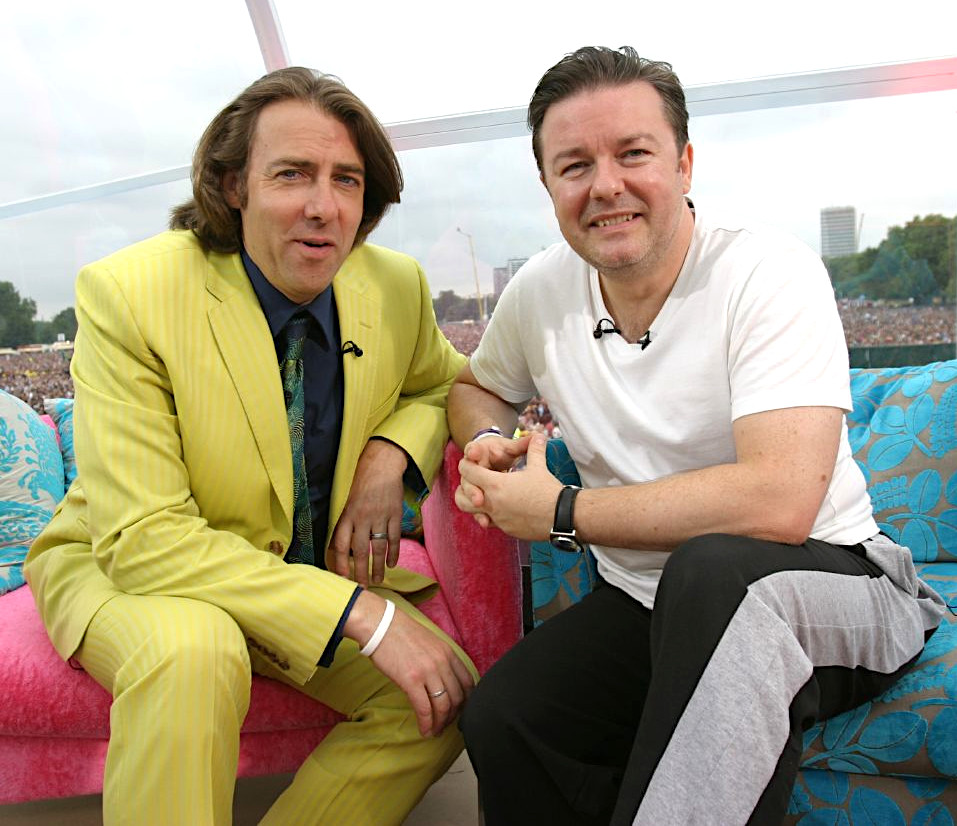
Gervais (right) with Jonathan Ross at Live 8 in Hyde Park, London, July 2005

A Christmas special of Extras aired on 27 December 2007 in the UK and on 16 December 2007 in the US, featuring guest appearances by George Michael, Clive Owen, Gordon Ramsay, Jonathan Ross and David Tennant. A Rolling Stone article remarks that, in making Extras, Gervais was influenced by Larry David's Curb Your Enthusiasm, particularly in the format of celebrities making fools of themselves or subverting their public personas.

In 2007, Gervais won the Primetime Emmy Award for Outstanding Lead Actor in a Comedy Series for his portrayal of Andy Millman in the second series of Extras. As Gervais was not present at the awards ceremony, the trophy was accepted on his behalf by Steve Carell, the actor who starred as regional manager Michael Scott—the counterpart to Gervais's David Brent—on the American adaptation of The Office.

==== The Ricky Gervais Show ====
The Ricky Gervais Show is an animated TV show adapted from the podcast of the same name that debuted on US cable network HBO on 19 February 2010. In the UK, the first series began airing on 23 April 2010 on Channel 4. The show was developed using original podcast recordings from The Ricky Gervais Show starring Gervais, Stephen Merchant, and Karl Pilkington. After receiving an enthusiastic following in the US, HBO recommissioned the show for a second series, which aired in 2011, and a third series in 2012.

==== Life's Too Short ====
Life's Too Short began airing on BBC Two on 10 November 2011. Gervais and Stephen Merchant wrote this sitcom from an idea by Warwick Davis. It is described by Gervais as being about "the life of a showbiz dwarf" and as "a cross between Extras and The Office". The show stars actor Davis playing a fictionalised version of himself, as well as Gervais and Merchant. Premium cable channel HBO, which co-produced the series with the BBC, had the US rights and began airing the series on 19 February 2012.

==== An Idiot Abroad ====
An Idiot Abroad is a travel documentary produced by Gervais and Stephen Merchant in which a reluctant Karl Pilkington travels around the world, with his reactions to people and places recorded. Occasionally, Gervais and Merchant call to surprise him with a new place to visit or task to do. Pilkington reports back mostly complaining about the situation. Gervais says there is no planning; a camera crew follows his friend around filming for many hours, which Gervais edits down to an hour each episode. Two series and a Christmas special have aired; series one involves Pilkington visiting the Seven Wonders of the World. In the second show, he chooses to complete tasks from a bucket list provided by Gervais, and in the special, Warwick Davis joins Pilkington on a journey following Marco Polo's route from Italy to China.

==== Derek ====
In November 2011, Gervais filmed in London a 35-minute pilot episode for a potential comedy-drama series called Derek, which aired on Channel 4 on 12 April 2012. The pilot is solely written and directed by Gervais and features him in the title role of Derek Noakes, a 49-year-old retirement home worker, who "loves animals, Rolf Harris, Jesus, Deal or No Deal, Million Pound Drop, and Britain's Got Talent." The character first appeared in a 2001 Edinburgh Festival Fringe sketch as an aspiring comedian who loves animals and still lives with his mother. Gervais's co-host Karl Pilkington makes his acting debut as Derek's friend and facilities-caretaker Dougie who also works in the retirement home. British comedian Kerry Godliman plays Derek's best friend Hannah and David Earl plays Kev.

Gervais said that the series is about "kindness [being] more important than anything else". He added: "It's about the forgotten—everyone's forgotten. It's all these arbitrary people who didn't know each other, and they're in there now because they're in the last years of their life. And it's about the people who help them, who themselves are losers and have their own problems. It's about a bunch of people with nothing, but making the most of it, and they're together." He chose to set the sitcom in a retirement home after he watched Secret Millionaire—"It was always these people with huge problems who were helping other people. I thought about having Derek help old people because no one cares about old people in this country ... I think it's perfect for now." Channel 4 commissioned a full series of Derek that aired in early 2013. Derek was recommissioned for a second series, which premiered on 23 April 2014. Derek ended with a one-off final special, broadcast on Channel 4 in the UK on 22 December 2014.

==== After Life ====
On 9 May 2018, it was announced that Netflix had given a production order for the first season of the comedy drama After Life. It was created and directed by Gervais, who also starred in it and executive-produced it with Duncan Hayes, with Charlie Hanson as producer; the series premiered on 8 March 2019. On 3 April 2019, Netflix renewed the series for a second season, which launched on 24 April 2020. In May 2020, it was announced that Gervais had signed a new deal with Netflix, including a third season of After Life. Before the announcement Gervais said, "For the first time ever, I would do a series three, because the world's so rich. I love the characters, I love all the actors in it, I love my character, I love the town, I love the themes… I love the dog!"

=== Stand-up comedy ===
Gervais began his stand-up career in the late 1990s. His first successful show was at the Café Royal as part of the 2001 Edinburgh Festival Fringe. Titled Rubbernecker, it also featured Jimmy Carr, Robin Ince and Stephen Merchant. Gervais toured the UK in 2003 with his stand-up show Animals. The Politics tour followed a year later. Both shows were recorded for release on DVD and television broadcast. The third part of the themed live trilogy, Fame, took place in 2007. It started in Glasgow in January and ended in Sheffield in April. Blackpool reported selling out of tickets within 45 minutes of them going on sale. Newsnight Review's panel saw Animals during its Bloomsbury run and covered it in January 2003. They were not favourable, with Private Eye editor Ian Hislop saying it was "cobbled together ... banal ... a bit flat". After this, Gervais closed each show by calling Hislop an "ugly little pug-faced cunt". Fame was the subject of some controversy in January 2007 when Gervais included a routine, ostensibly about how people will do anything to become famous, referring to the murder of prostitutes in Ipswich.

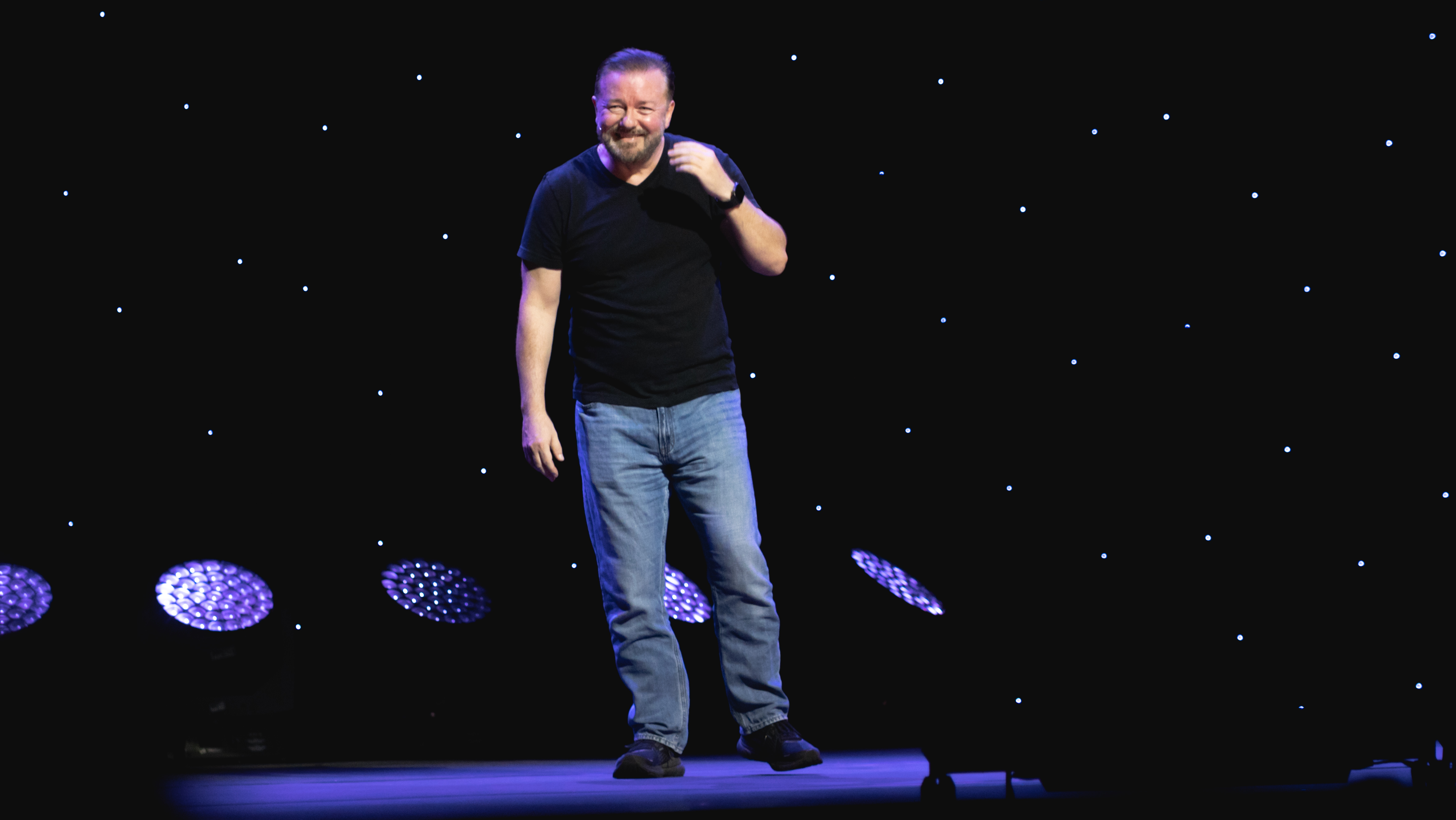
Gervais on stage at the London Palladium in the West End, September 2021

Gervais's fourth show was entitled Science, and commenced with an eleven-date tour in August 2009 at the Scottish Exhibition and Conference Centre in Glasgow. The DVD was released on 15 November 2010. In November 2009, he headlined the sixth annual New York Comedy Festival at Carnegie Hall. In 2013, Gervais announced that his next stand-up show would be called Humanity. In December 2014, he said he was too busy to do the tour due to producing two films. In May 2016, Gervais performed stand-up in London, starting with some low key warm-ups with cast members from Derek. He said: "Finally, I'm going to do some stand-up. The first in about six years if you don't count hosting the Golden Globes".

He continued his Humanity show throughout 2017 and into 2018. He appeared at SF Sketchfest as part of the tour, which devoted a night in honour of him, alongside comedic legend and mentor Christopher Guest. His next tour and Netflix special SuperNature was announced in late 2018, where Gervais warned people not to travel to see "work in progress" as it would be a "shambles". SuperNature shows continued through 2019 and 2020. Following significant cancellations and postponements as a result of the COVID-19 pandemic, the SuperNature tours resumed in August 2021. SuperNature received criticism for jokes about transgender people. It won the Best Stand-Up Show at the National Comedy Awards. In May 2023, in the world-wide tour of his comedy special, Armageddon, he was reported to have an earned £1.41 million for a single stand-up gig, at the Hollywood Bowl, the highest-grossing one-off gig ever by a British comedian. The show was released on Netflix on 25 December 2023 but faced controversy for making a joke about cancer patients. The special later won for "Best Performance in Stand-Up Comedy on Television" at the 81st Golden Globe Awards, but Gervais didn't attend the ceremony.

==== Animation ====
One of the first animations Gervais voiced was the character of Penguin in Robbie the Reindeer's Legend of the Lost Tribe. He had a starring role in Disney's Valiant, with Ewan McGregor, John Cleese and Jim Broadbent, as pigeon Bugsy. Gervais guest-starred in an episode of The Simpsons entitled "Homer Simpson, This Is Your Wife". He is the only British comic to write and star in a Simpsons episode. The episode was the highest-rated in Sky One's history; it revolved around the angle that Gervais was the episode's sole writer (and the first guest star on the show to also receive a writing credit for the episode of his appearance).

Gervais clarified the extent of his input in a joint interview (with Christopher Guest) for Dazed and Confused magazine (January 2006): "No, all I did was put down a load of observations on an email and they made it look like a Simpsons script. I'm going to get the credit, but I think everyone in the industry knows it was a joint effort". Asked in a separate interview about how his idea for the episode (in which Homer swaps Marge on a game show) came about, Gervais replied: "I've always been fascinated with reality game shows but I think it was my girlfriend's idea. We watch Celebrity Big Brother at the moment, we watch I'm a Celebrity, Get Me out of Here... we watch all those reality TV shows—The Office came out of those docu-soaps". Gervais, a longstanding Simpsons fan, presented a segment to mark the show's 20th anniversary on BBC Two's The Culture Show on 16 June 2007.

In 2012, Gervais made a guest appearance on Family Guy in the episode titled "Be Careful What You Fish For". In the episode, Gervais plays a dolphin named Billy Finn who gives Peter Griffin a Mercedes-Benz hood ornament, and Peter half-heartedly promises a favour to him. Soon, Billy moves to Quahog but outstays his welcome at Peter's. Peter tries to reunite Billy with his ex-wife in hopes that he will return to the ocean. The episode also featured Lucy Davis, with whom Gervais starred in The Office.

==== Guest star on television series ====
Gervais had a cameo role in Simon Pegg's and Jessica Hynes's sitcom Spaced as Dave, an estate agent who mistakenly places the advertisement for a property for a couple that turns out to be the premise of the show. Gervais has also guest-starred on Alias (in the third-season episode "Façade") as Daniel Ryan, a former Royal Navy bomb-disposal specialist turned rogue Irish Republican Army bomb-maker. He has also made guest appearances on Sesame Street. Louis C.K. had Gervais play Dr Ben, his doctor, on two episodes of his series Louie. Gervais broke into his trademark hysterical laugh every time his character made Louie the butt of a joke. In early 2015, Gervais guest-starred in Galavant, a four-week comedy mini-series, as Xanax the magician. It aired on ABC and Gervais got to show off his singing skills.

==== Entertainment ====
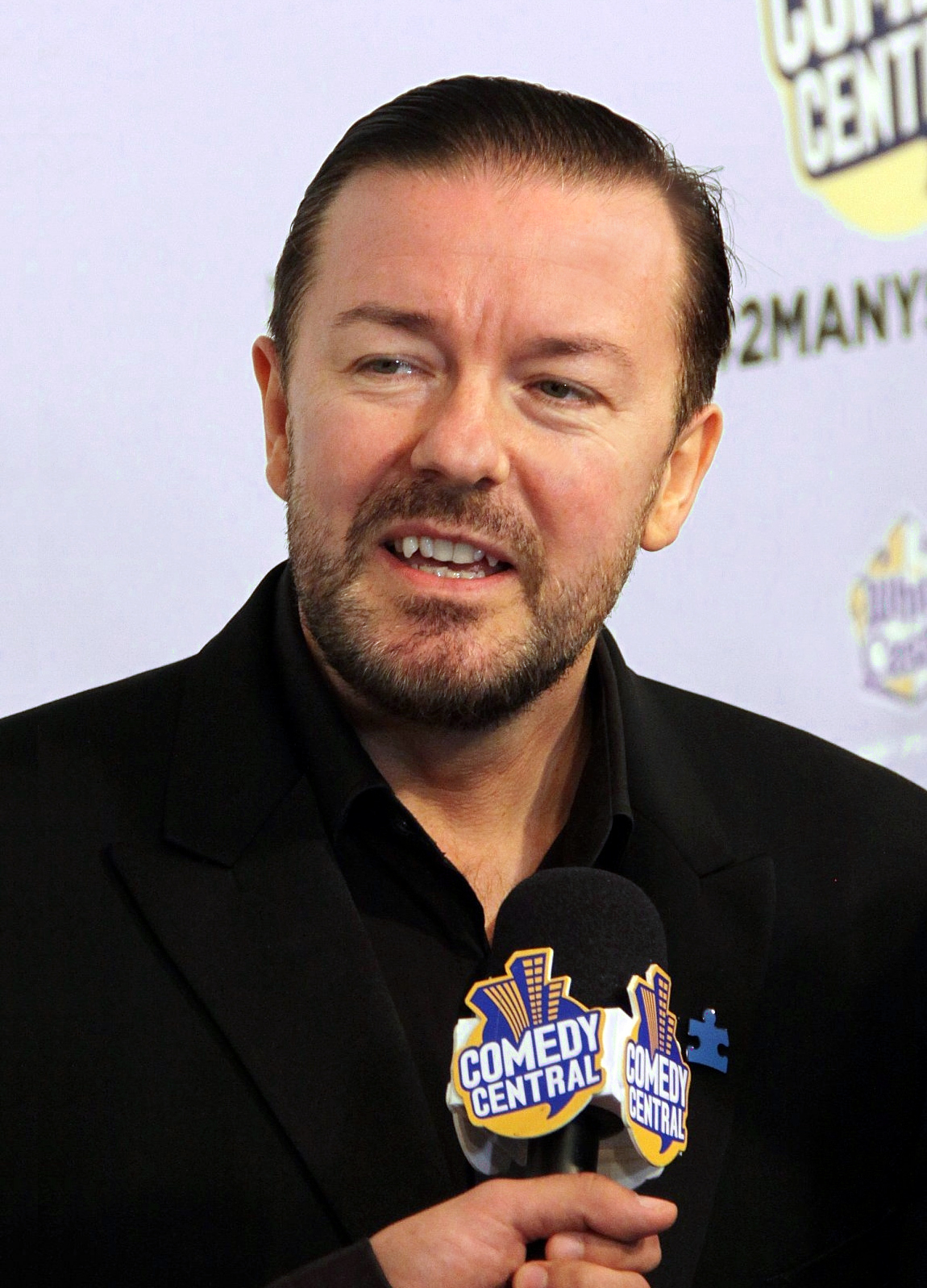
Gervais in 2010

Gervais made a cameo appearance on Saturday Night Live in a Digital Short, during which he joked that The Office was adapted from a Japanese programme of the same name (with Steve Carell reprising his role as Michael Scott). The sketch re-creates scenes from the American and British pilot episode with Japanese elements (although in an exaggerated way). "It's funny", Gervais laughs at the end, "because it's racist".

Gervais hosted the 67th, 68th, 69th, 73rd and 77th Golden Globe Awards. His appearance in 2010 made him the first master of ceremonies since 1995. He stated: "I have resisted many other offers like this, but there are just some things you don't turn down." His performance as host received a mixed response, with positive reviews from the New York Daily News and the Associated Press, but also some negative comments from The Hollywood Reporter. His 2011 hosting of the awards was controversial for his jokes that were at the expense of many of the nominees, similar to the New York Friars Club roast-style jokes. His jibes were described as setting "a corrosive tone" by one critic, though some celebrities were seen crying from laughter, leaving the overall reaction to be 'mixed'. Gervais responded: "They are my friends, but I had to play the outsider." His 2020 hosting performance, particularly the opening monologue, garnered both praise and criticism from the public and press. He later responded to the negative media coverage by tweeting: "I always knew that there were morons in the world that took jokes seriously, but I'm surprised that some journalists do." He also stated several times during the opening monologue that it would be his final appearance as host, though he made a similar declaration during his first hosting performance in 2010.

Gervais was a guest judge on Jerry Seinfeld's NBC show The Marriage Ref alongside Larry David and Madonna. He has also been a regular guest on Seinfeld's Comedians in Cars Getting Coffee. Talking Funny, which first aired on 28 April 2011, starred Gervais and fellow standup comedians Louis C.K., Chris Rock and Jerry Seinfeld having an informal round-table discussion on stand-up comedy. This one off HBO special was well received by critics & audience alike. In 2013, Gervais guest starred in David Blaine: Real or Magic, a television special where Blaine proceeded to run a large needle through his forearm in front of Gervais.

==== Talk shows ====
In January 2006, Gervais interviewed Larry David in a one-off special, Ricky Gervais Meets... Larry David. On 25 and 26 December 2006 he interviewed Christopher Guest and Garry Shandling which aired on Channel 4. There are no plans for further episodes of Meets..., although editions with Monty Python co-founder John Cleese and The Simpsons creator Matt Groening were recorded in 2006 for broadcast in 2007. A source claimed, "The Shandling experience put him off for good". In January 2009, Gervais was a guest on BravoTV Inside the Actors Studio season 15 with James Lipton, where at one point of the interview he answered Lipton's question as David Brent, his character from The Office. Brent obliged the audience by singing his song "Freelove Freeway" with a guitar supplied to him by Lipton.

Gervais has been on The Late Show with David Letterman 26 times. In 2008, he helped Letterman read out the Late Show Top Ten List, Top Ten Stupid Things Americans Say To Brits. In mid-2014, upon hearing that Letterman was up for retirement, Gervais jokingly tried to discourage him by suggesting they go on a road trip where they would spend all their money. Gervais has appeared on the BBC's The Graham Norton Show many times over the years. He has been on Graham Norton's couch with Stephen Merchant, co-creator and co-writer of The Office, to promote Cemetery Junction. Another appearance saw him talk about his series Life's Too Short. Johnny Depp was also there to promote his own film.

=== Video games ===
Gervais is one of two featured comedians (the other being Katt Williams) in the video game Grand Theft Auto IV who performs at the Split Sides comedy club on the virtual stand-up stage and as an interviewee on the in game radio station We Know The Truth. For the stand-up bit a special three-minute act was written, recorded and fully motion-captured.

=== Books ===
==== Flanimals ====
Gervais released a children's book in 2004, Flanimals (illustrated by Rob Steen), which depicted nonsense animals. After the success of this book, he released its sequel More Flanimals in 2005, with Flanimals of the Deep coming the next year. A new Flanimals book, Flanimals: The Day of the Bletchling, was released in October 2007. Flanimals: Pop Up was also published in 2009.

==== Published television scripts ====
The Office scripts have been released in book form, with series one issued in 2002, and the remaining episodes following in 2003. Extras: The Illustrated Scripts: Series 1 & 2 has been released, as well.

==== Other books ====
The World of Karl Pilkington was presented by Gervais and Merchant. These were essentially transcripts of Xfm shows podcasts and featured illustrations by Pilkington.

=== Film ===
Gervais's film career has included supporting roles as the voice of a pigeon, Bugsy, in 2005's Valiant, as a studio executive in 2006's For Your Consideration, as museum director Dr. McPhee in 2006's Night at the Museum and its sequels Night at the Museum: Battle of the Smithsonian and Night at the Museum: Secret of the Tomb, and as "Ferdy the Fence" in the 2007 film Stardust. Gervais starred in Ghost Town (2008) as a dentist who sees spirits, and co-wrote and co-directed (with Matt Robinson) The Invention of Lying (2009), in which he starred alongside Jennifer Garner, Rob Lowe and Louis C.K. Gervais and collaborator Stephen Merchant made a film called Cemetery Junction, set in 1970s Britain, about class, love and fulfilment. The film was released in April 2010. Gervais starred in Muppets Most Wanted (2014) as Dominic Badguy, the partner of the movie's villain, Constantine.

Gervais directed and starred in, Special Correspondents, which began filming in May 2015. The comedy stars Eric Bana as a journalist and Gervais as his assistant. They pretend to report news from a war torn country but in actuality they are safe in New York. The film was released on Netflix. Gervais directed and starred in the 2016 film David Brent: Life on the Road, a mockumentary following David Brent, a character first seen in The Office series, as he lives his dream of being a rockstar. On 5 November 2015 Gervais signed up to play Ika Chu, a villainous cat, in an animated film Paws of Fury: The Legend of Hank, originally known as Blazing Samurai. The movie is about a dog (Hank) played by Michael Cera, who wants to be a warrior and fights with Ika Chu for the town of Kakamucho.

In 2023, the BBC aired 7 Minutes, a short film about two people wanting to commit suicide at the same train station. Directed by Gervais, the film is part of the station's Comedy Shorts series and was released in May 2023. In March 2023, Gervais had teased the project when he tweeted a photograph from the setting.

=== Other appearances ===
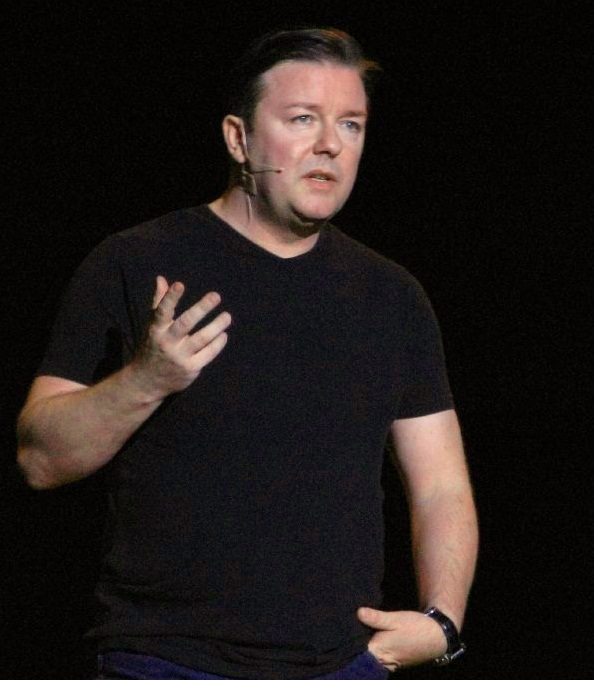
Ricky Gervais performing at Tribeca Performing Arts Center in New York in 2007

On 2 July 2005, Gervais appeared at the Live 8 event held in London's Hyde Park, where he performed his famous dance from The Office.

==== Concert for Diana and Live Earth ====
On 1 July 2007, Gervais performed at the Concert for Diana at Wembley, a music event celebrating the life of Princess Diana 10 years after her death. Towards the end of the event—after a pre-recorded introduction from Ben Stiller—Gervais appeared along with fellow Office star Mackenzie Crook. They performed "Free Love Freeway", a song previously heard in the fourth episode of series one of The Office. Due to a technical problem, Gervais then had to fill time until he was able to re-introduce Elton John to close the show, so he did the David Brent dance, as well as singing the "Little Fat Man" song as performed by David Bowie in episode two of the second series of Extras.

In July 2007, following Gervais's appearance at the memorial concert for the Princess of Wales, The Guardian ran a column by Daily Mirror television critic Jim Shelley entitled "Call Me Crazy... But Has Ricky Gervais Lost It?", where he described Gervais as a "tiresome embarrassment". The following week, The Guardian noted that Gervais had responded with "an exhilaratingly foul-mouthed tirade" on his website, concluding with the sentence "yes I am resting on my fucking laurels you cunt!" In this video, Gervais mocked Jim Shelley typing the words "resting on his laurels", and jokingly lashed out by stating that he was resting on his laurels and that he was not going to make another show for television, quipping: "What's the point? What is there to beat?"

== Personal life ==
Gervais has homes in Hampstead, London, and Marlow, Buckinghamshire. He also has an apartment in the Barbizon 63 building in Manhattan, New York City. He has been in a relationship with producer and author Jane Fallon since 1982, and states they have chosen not to marry because "there's no point in us having an actual ceremony before the eyes of God because there is no God" or have children because they "didn't fancy dedicating 16 years of [their] lives … and there are too many children, of course".

He has been vegan for some time. He is an atheist and a humanist, abandoning religion at the age of eight. In December 2010, he wrote an op-ed for The Wall Street Journal explaining his atheism. He is an honorary associate of the British National Secular Society and a patron of Humanists UK, a British charity that promotes the humanist worldview and campaigns for a secular state and on human rights issues. On 3 September 2019, he received the 2019 Richard Dawkins Award, which recognises people who proclaim "the values of secularism and rationalism, upholding scientific truths wherever it may lead." Gervais received the award during a Centre for Inquiry-sponsored ceremony at London's Troxy Theatre. Richard Dawkins praised Gervais as a "witty hero of atheism and reason".

Gervais is a fan of the UFC and Reading Football Club. He is a music fan and has stated that his hero is David Bowie, with his favourite song being "Letter to Hermione". He has also stated that his first experience of a live music gig was watching Iggy Pop. In 2013, he wrote that Lou Reed was "one of the greatest artists of our time" following Reed's death. Gervais is one of the 100 contributors to the book, Dear NHS: 100 Stories to Say Thank You, of which all proceeds go to NHS Charities Together and The Lullaby Trust. Gervais is a supporter of gay rights and has praised the introduction of same-sex marriage in England and Wales as "a victory for all of us", saying "anything that promotes equality, promotes progress ... You can't take equality 'too far'."

Gervais has attracted criticism for the content of his stage routines and social media posts which have been called transphobic. Despite this, Gervais has stated that he supports trans rights, saying in his Netflix special "I support all human rights, and trans rights are human rights." In June 2017, Gervais endorsed Labour Party leader Jeremy Corbyn in the 2017 UK general election. He tweeted: "OK. I'm not telling you how to vote, but this is a fact. The only vote that will keep Theresa May out is a vote for Jeremy Corbyn. Cheers."

=== Social media ===
Gervais joined Twitter in December 2009 when he first hosted the 66th Golden Globes. After a two-year hiatus, he returned to the platform in September 2011. In 2012, Gervais won a Shorty Award for Lifetime Achievement for his popular presence on social media. In 2014, he was named most influential London Twitter user. As of July 2022, he was followed by 15 million fans whom he refers to as "twonks", a term he had also previously used to describe co-star Karl Pilkington. Gervais uses social media to promote his work to his fans. After ten years, he brought back his character Brent on his YouTube channel in a web series Learn Guitar with David Brent. He also posts contests or questions to his fans as promotion for his series.

Gervais uses social media to raise awareness of animal welfare. He tweets links to petitions to rescue animals from captivity, he highlights animals involved in scientific and biomedical research, and he encourages people to adopt dogs instead of buying them from breeders. He won the Genesis Award from the Humane Society in March 2015 for his contribution to raising awareness for animal welfare on social media.

=== Charity work ===
In 2002, Gervais took part in a charity boxing match against Grant Bovey, for the UK charity telethon Comic Relief. He was trained for the three-round contest by boxing trainer siblings Kellie and Eugene Maloney, at their Fight Factory gymnasium. It was the second televised charity boxing match, the first being Bob Mortimer against Les Dennis. The fight was televised by the BBC, and Gervais came out on top by a split decision verdict. He donated his £5,000 prize money to the training of a Macmillan nurse who specialised in cancer support.

Gervais is a supporter of animal rights and has stated that he will leave his fortune to animal charities. Gervais named an Asian black bear, also known as a moonbear, Derek, after the protagonist from his series Derek. In December 2013, Gervais bought a $1,000 cake shaped like a moonbear to raise funds for Animal Asia. Gervais is active in the prevention of illegal wildlife trade; he supported the handing over of ivory trinkets to the Metropolitan police in London. In 2023, Gervais donated £1 million to animal charities. In 2025, he donated £2.5 million, once again in aid of various animal charities.

In 2015, Gervais donated a signed acoustic guitar to help raise funds for Story Book Farm Primate Sanctuary in Ontario, Canada, with a special call-out to Pockets Warhol. The guitar, which was signed by Gervais, was purchased by Danny Young from the United Kingdom, who has since had the guitar signed by several celebrities in order to raise further funds for the Story Book Farm Primate Sanctuary. Celebrities who signed the guitar include: Brian May, Will Ferrell, Bryan Cranston, Dhani Harrison, Peter Frampton, Ricky Warwick and Steve Cutts.

In 2017, Gervais was awarded the Lord Houghton Award for Service to Animal Welfare from Animal Defenders International. Gervais was also awarded the Humane Society International Cecil Award in 2018 for his frequent social media efforts to end trophy hunting. In 2021, Gervais joined the Rewriting Extinction campaign to fight the climate and biodiversity crisis through comics. Gervais created the comic story "Bullfight" in collaboration with the illustrator Rob Steen. The comic was released in the book The Most Important Comic Book on Earth: Stories to Save the World on 28 October 2021 by DK.

== Influences ==
Gervais has cited Laurel & Hardy, Groucho Marx, Peter Cook and Christopher Guest as significant influences. The decision of John Cleese to stop making his acclaimed 1970s comedy sitcom Fawlty Towers after 12 episodes—when it was at its creative height—inspired Gervais in keeping his own sitcoms (The Office, Extras and Derek) to 12 episodes each. His comedy is observational and satirises everyday life.

== Works ==
=== Films ===
Year	Title	Actor	Director	Writer	Producer	Role	Notes	Ref.
2001	Dog Eat Dog	Yes	No	No	No	Bouncer		
2005	Valiant	Yes	No	No	No	Bugsy	Voice only	
2006	For Your Consideration	Yes	No	No	No	Martin Gibb		
2006	Night at the Museum	Yes	No	No	No	Dr. McPhee		
2007	Stardust	Yes	No	No	No	Ferdy the Fence		
2008	Ghost Town	Yes	No	No	No	Dr. Bertram Pincus		
2009	Night at the Museum: Battle of the Smithsonian	Yes	No	No	No	Dr. McPhee		
2009	The Invention of Lying	Yes	Yes	Yes	Yes	Mark Bellison	Co-written and co-directed with Matthew Robinson	
2010	Cemetery Junction	Yes	Yes	Yes	Executive	Len Taylor	Co-written and co-directed with Stephen Merchant	
2011	Spy Kids: All the Time in the World	Yes	No	No	No	Argonaut	Voice only	
2013	Escape from Planet Earth	Yes	No	No	No	Mr. James Bing	Voice only	
2014	Muppets Most Wanted	Yes	No	No	No	Dominic Badguy		
2014	Night at the Museum: Secret of the Tomb	Yes	No	No	No	Dr. McPhee		
2015	The Little Prince	Yes	No	No	No	The Conceited Man	Voice only	
2016	Special Correspondents	Yes	Yes	Yes	Yes	Ian Finch		
2016	David Brent: Life on the Road	Yes	Yes	Yes	Yes	David Brent		
2020	The Willoughbys	Yes	No	No	Executive	The Cat/Narrator	Voice only	
2021	Save Ralph	Yes	No	No	No	Documentary crew member	Voice only	
2022	Paws of Fury: The Legend of Hank	Yes	No	No	No	Ika Chu	Voice only	
2023	7 Minutes	No	Yes	No	Yes	—N/a	Short film	
2025	Dog Man	Yes	No	No	No	Flippy the fish	Voice only	

=== Television ===
Year	Title	Actor	Director	Writer	Executive Producer	Creator	Role	Notes	Ref.
1999	The Jim Tavaré Show	Yes	No	Yes	No	No	Various	7 episodes	
1999	Comedy Lab	Yes	No	Yes	No	No	Clive Meadows	Episode: "Golden Years"	
2000	The 11 O'Clock Show	Yes	No	No	No	No	Various	20 episodes	
2000	Bruiser	No	No	Yes	No	No	—N/a		
2000	Meet Ricky Gervais	Yes	No	Yes	No	No	Himself (host)	6 episodes	
2001	Spaced	Yes	No	No	No	No	Dave	Episode: "Dissolution"	
2001–2003	The Office	Yes	Yes	Yes	Yes	Yes	David Brent	14 episodes; Co-created, co-written and co-directed with Stephen Merchant	
2002	Robbie the Reindeer in Legend of the Lost Tribe	Yes	No	No	No	No	Penguin	Voice; Television special	
2003	Happiness	Yes	No	No	No	No	Himself	Episode: "Real Dancing"	
2003	Ricky Gervais Live: Animals	Yes	No	Yes	Yes	No	Himself	Stand-up special	
2004	Ricky Gervais Live 2: Politics	Yes	No	Yes	Yes	No	Himself	Stand-up special	
2004	Alias	Yes	No	No	No	No	Daniel Ryan	Episode: "Façade"	
2005–2007	Extras	Yes	Yes	Yes	Yes	Yes	Andy Millman	13 episodes; Co-created, co-written and co-directed with Stephen Merchant	
2005–2013	The Office (U.S.)	Yes	No	Yes	Yes	Yes	David Brent	American remake of his show "The Office" co-created with Stephen Merchant; Appeared in episodes: "The Seminar" and "Search Committee", and co-wrote "The Convict" with Stephen Merchant	
2006, 2011	The Simpsons	Yes	No	Yes	No	No	Charles Heathbar/Himself	Voice; 2 episodes and wrote episode "Homer Simpson, This Is Your Wife"	
2007	Ricky Gervais Live 3: Fame	Yes	No	Yes	Yes	No	Himself	Stand-up special	
2008	Ricky Gervais: Out of England	Yes	No	Yes	Yes	No	Himself	Stand-up special	
2009	Sesame Street	Yes	No	No	No	No	Himself	3 episodes	
2009	SpongeBob SquarePants	Yes	No	No	No	No	Narrator	Voice; Episode: "SpongeBob's Truth or Square"	
2010	67th Golden Globe Awards	Yes	No	No	No	No	Himself (host)	Television special	
2010	Louie	Yes	No	No	No	No	Dr. Ben	2 episodes	
2010	Ricky Gervais: Out of England 2	Yes	No	Yes	Yes	No	Himself	Stand-up special	
2010	Ricky Gervais Live 4: Science	Yes	No	Yes	Yes	No	Himself	Stand-up special	
2010–2012	The Ricky Gervais Show	Yes	No	No	Yes	Yes	Himself	Voice; 39 episodes	
2010–2012	An Idiot Abroad	Yes	No	No	Yes	Yes	Himself	21 episodes	
2011	68th Golden Globe Awards	Yes	No	Yes	No	No	Himself (host)	Television special	
2011	Talking Funny	Yes	No	No	Yes	No	Himself	Television special	
2011	Curb Your Enthusiasm	Yes	No	No	No	No	Himself	Episode: "The Hero"	
2011–2013	Life's Too Short	Yes	Yes	Yes	Yes	Yes	Himself	7 episodes; Co-created with Stephen Merchant and Warwick Davis and co-written and co-directed with Stephen Merchant	
2012	69th Golden Globe Awards	Yes	No	Yes	No	No	Himself (host)	Television special	
2012	Family Guy	Yes	No	No	No	No	Billy Finn	Voice; Episode: "Be Careful What You Fish For"	
2012–2014	Derek	Yes	Yes	Yes	Yes	Yes	Derek Noakes	14 episodes	
2015	Galavant	Yes	No	No	No	No	Xanax	Episode: "Dungeons and Dragon Lady"	
2015	BoJack Horseman	Yes	No	No	No	No	Hedgehog at Orphanage	Voice; Episode: "Out to Sea"	
2016	73rd Golden Globe Awards	Yes	No	Yes	No	No	Himself (host)	Television special	
2018	Child Support	Yes	No	No	Yes	No	Himself		
2018	Ricky Gervais: Humanity	Yes	No	Yes	Yes	No	Himself	Stand-up special	
2019	Scooby-Doo and Guess Who?	Yes	No	No	No	No	Himself	Voice; Episode: "Ollie Ollie In-Come Free!"	
2019–2022	After Life	Yes	Yes	Yes	Yes	Yes	Tony Johnson	18 episodes	
2020	77th Golden Globe Awards	Yes	No	Yes	No	No	Himself (host)	Television special	
2022	Ricky Gervais: SuperNature	Yes	No	Yes	Yes	No	Himself	Stand-up special Also music writer	
2023	Ricky Gervais: Armageddon	Yes	No	Yes	Yes	No	Himself	Stand-up special	
2025–present	The Paper	No	No	No	Yes	No	—N/a	Follow-up and spinoff to the American remake of his show The Office co-created with Stephen Merchant	
2025	Ricky Gervais: Mortality	Yes	No	Yes	Yes	No	Himself	Stand-up special	
2026	Alley Cats	Yes	Yes	No	Yes	Yes	Gus	Voice	

=== Radio ===
Year	Title	Station	Role	Notes	Ref.
1998	The Ricky Gervais Show	XFM	Self, co-host	Presented with Stephen Merchant	
2001–2005	The Ricky Gervais Show	XFM	Self, co-host	Presented with Stephen Merchant and Karl Pilkington	
2017–2019	Ricky Gervais Is Deadly Sirius	SiriusXM	Self, host		

=== Video games ===
Year	Title	Role	Ref.
2006	Scarface: The World Is Yours	Simon Trent	
2008	Grand Theft Auto IV	Himself	
2009	Night at the Museum: Battle of the Smithsonian	Dr. McPhee	

== Bibliography ==
- Gervais, Ricky (March 2005). Flanimals. Putnam Juvenile. ISBN 978-0-39924397-4.
- ——— (March 2006). More Flanimals. Putnam Juvenile. ISBN 978-0-39924605-0.
- ——— (October 2006). Flanimals of the Deep. Faber Children's Books. ISBN 978-0-57123403-5.
- ——— (October 2007). Flanimals: The Day of the Bletchling. Faber Children's Books. ISBN 978-0-57123851-4.
- ——— (December 2007). Flanimals: A Complete Natural History. Faber Children's Books. ISBN 978-0-57123850-7.
- ——— (March 2010). Flanimals Pop-up. Candlewick. ISBN 978-0-39924605-0.
- ———; Merchant, Stephen (November 2006). Extras: The Illustrated Scripts: Series 1 & 2. Little, Brown Book Group. ISBN 978-0-31603039-7.
- ———; ——— (August 2007). The Office: The Scripts Series 1. BBC Books. ISBN 978-0-56348847-7.
- ———; ——— (August 2007). The Office: The Scripts Series 2. BBC Books. ISBN 978-0-56348741-8.
- Pilkington, Karl (September 2006). The World of Karl Pilkington. Hachette Books. ISBN 978-1-40130342-6.

== Awards and recognition ==
Throughout his career, Gervais has won numerous awards, including seven British Academy Television Awards, five National Comedy Awards, two Primetime Emmy Awards, five Golden Globe Awards, and the Rose d'Or twice (2006 and 2019). For his success in television, in 2006, the British public ranked him number 30 in ITV's poll of TV's 50 Greatest Stars. In 2010, he was included in the Time 100 list of World's Most Influential People. On 31 May 2025, Gervais received a star on the Hollywood Walk of Fame. During the ceremony, he described the honour as "humbling" and attributed his success to "luck, persistence, and a little bit of pushing against the tide".

== See also ==
- List of British comedians
- List of British actors
- List of atheists in film, radio, television and theatre
- List of Golden Globe winners
- List of Primetime Emmy Award winners
