= Mentalism (disambiguation) =

Mentalism is an performing art in which the practitioner simulates psychic abilities.

Mentalism may also refer to:

- Mentalism (philosophy), the belief that the mind truly exists
- Mentalism (psychology), those branches of study that concentrate on mental perception and thought processes
- Mentalism (discrimination), a form of discrimination against people labeled as having a mental disorder
- Oriental Mentalism, a spiritual doctrine expounded by Paul Brunton

== See also ==
- Mentalist (disambiguation)
