= Animals (2003 film) =

Video by Ricky Gervais
- Released: 17 November 2003
- Recorded: Bloomsbury Theatre, London, United Kingdom
- Genre: Stand-up comedy
- Length: 73 minutes
- Label: Universal Pictures

Ricky Gervais chronology
Animals (2003)	Politics (2004)

Ricky Gervais Live: Animals is the title of a feature-length programme released in 2003. Featuring British comedian Ricky Gervais, it was filmed at the Bloomsbury Theatre, London, during his first stand-up tour. The show was broadcast on ITV on 27 August 2004.

== Reception ==
A review in The Times said that "Gervais switches between crassness and absurdist brilliance in Animals".
