= Politics (2004 film) =

Video by Ricky Gervais
- Released: 15 November 2004
- Recorded: London, United Kingdom
- Venue: Palace Theatre
- Genre: Stand-up comedy
- Length: 68 minutes
- Label: Universal Pictures

Ricky Gervais chronology
Animals (2003)	Politics (2004)	Fame (2007)

Ricky Gervais Live 2: Politics is the title of a stand-up comedy performance by British comedian Ricky Gervais, directed by Dominic Brigstocke. It was filmed at the Palace Theatre, London, United Kingdom in 2004.
