= Flanimals of the Deep =

Book by Ricky Gervais

- Flanimals of the Deep book cover
- Author: Ricky Gervais
- Illustrator: Rob Steen
- Cover artist: Rob Steen
- Published: 2006 (Faber and Faber)
- Media type: Hardback
- ISBN: 0-571-23403-8
- OCLC: 70881855
- Preceded by: More Flanimals
- Followed by: Flanimals: The Day of the Bletchling

Flanimals of the Deep (ISBN 0571234038) is the third book in the Flanimals series from British comedian Ricky Gervais and illustrator Rob Steen. The book was published by Faber and Faber, London, UK on 5 October 2006 and includes such Flanimals as the Mulgi, Flambols, Bif Uddlers and Mulons.

Flanimals of the Deep won the 'Best Stocking Filler' book of the year in 2006, as voted on Richard and Judy's Christmas Book Reviews. It was also named the "WH Smith Children's Book of the Year" for 2007.

== List of Flanimals ==
- Mulon – an extremely intelligent humanoid Flanimal that once lived on land, but now is adapted to the sea. Believes all life is precious, especially on land. All others sing harmoniously on one’s death. Related to Blungling.
- Groy – a small intelligent aquatic Flanimal that farms Sleeb.
- Sleeb – a slow moving bovine-like Flanimal farmed by the Groy.
- Molf – an aggressive shark-like aquatic Flanimal that only swims and kills.
- Sproy – a many 'noizelled' Flanimal that uses them to attempt to scare off predators. They only question what it’s doing though.
- Plumph – a Flanimal that can pull its eyes into its body for protection but damages its own eyes on its own poison.
- Hungloid – a large fish-like Flanimal that asks if it’s ugly, even if it knows.
- Klug Snipe – a hideous aquatic Flanimal that is actually full of love and wants to do good.
- Roxstrambler – a squid-like predatory Flanimal with crab claws that no Flanimal likes.
- Spryflajer – an aquatic Flanimal with tennis racket shaped fins that it uses to confuse prey. They won’t eat it though.
- Splug – a jellyfish-like Flanimal that hates itself. They seem to be able to propel themselves.
- Blamp – an blob fish-like Flanimal that are always sad and wrinkled. Supposedly it’s against the law to not think this.
- Ungler Water Mungler – an aquatic version of the Mung Ungler (described in More Flanimals) has buoyant utters, that cause it to drown due to them being on its back.
- Flambol – a flat paper thin Flant (Flanimal-plants).
- Weedles - Flanimal equivalents to tube-dwelling anemones.
- Clumbs - Flanimal equivalents to sea anemones.
- Splungi - Flanimal equivalents to coral.
- Lazabranks – a family of primitive shark-like unskulled Flanimals. Include Grelch, Krobler, and Bronk.
- Skellyosts - a family of ugly eel-like Flanimals, with no stomachs.
- Snish – simple fish-like Flanimals.
- Scrownocks – aquatic Flanimals that produce a spine-tingling scream.
- Brones – thin jawed aquatic Flanimals.
- Skrolls – terrifying demon-like aquatic Flanimals that inhabit the brine.

== See also ==
- Flanimals
- More Flanimals
- Flanimals: The Day of the Bletchling
