= Stephen Merchant =

English comedian, writer and actor (born 1974)

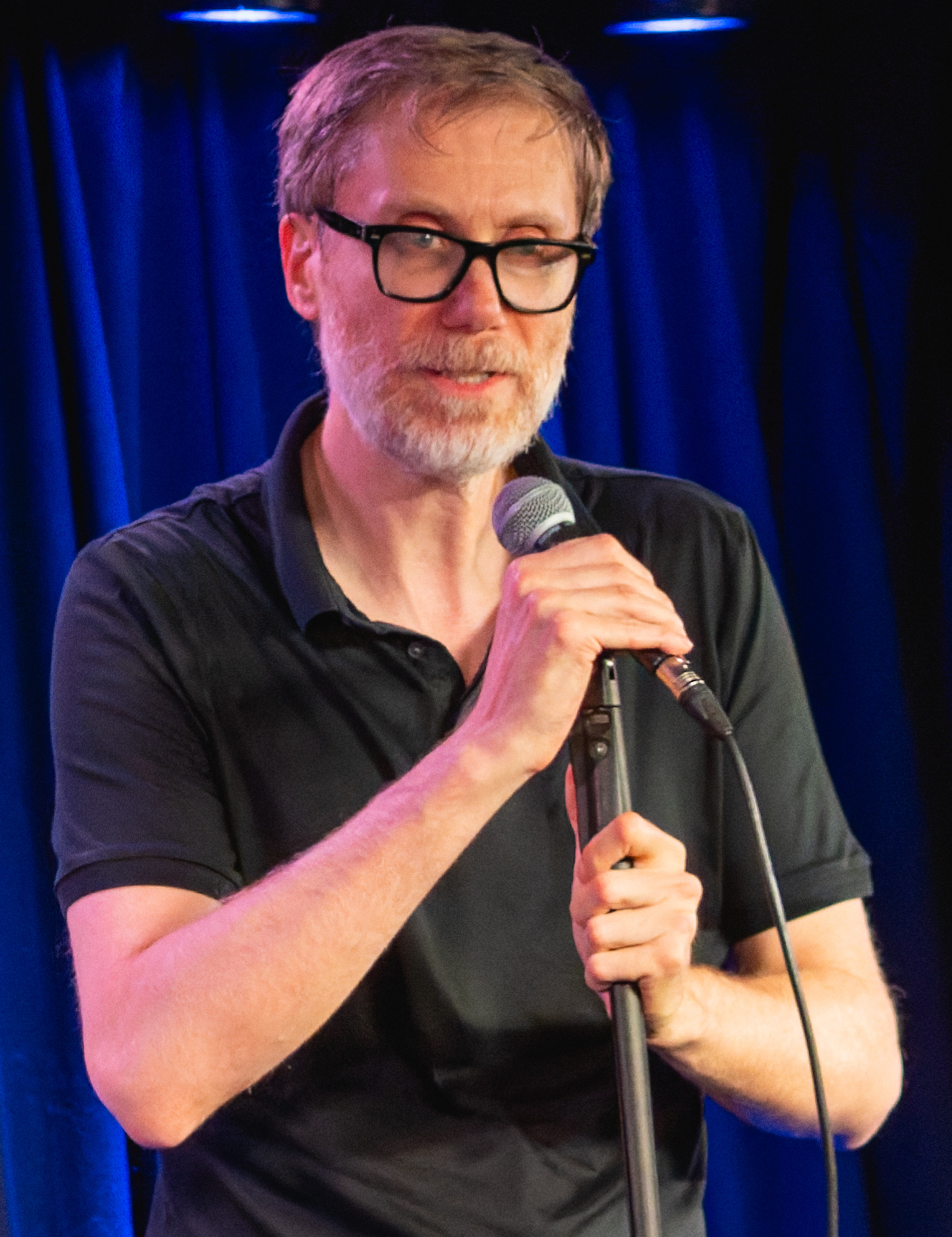
- Merchant in 2025
- Born: Stephen James Merchant; 24 November 1974 (age 51); Hanham, Bristol, England
- Education: University of Warwick (BA)
- Occupations: Comedian; actor; director; writer
- Years active: 1997–present
- Height: 6 ft 7 in (2.01 m)
- Partner: Mircea Monroe (2018–present)
- Website: www.stephenmerchant.com

Stephen James Merchant (born 24 November 1974) is an English comedian, writer, director, and actor. He was the co-creator and co-director of the British TV comedy series The Office (2001–2003), and co-creator, co-director, and co-star of both Extras (2005–2007) and Life's Too Short (2011–2013) alongside Ricky Gervais. With Gervais and Karl Pilkington, he hosted The Ricky Gervais Show in its radio, podcast, audiobook, and television formats; the radio version won a bronze Sony Award. He also provided the voice of the robotic Wheatley in the video games Portal 2 (2011) and Lego Dimensions (2015). Merchant co-developed the Sky One travel documentary series An Idiot Abroad (2010–2012) and co-created Lip Sync Battle (2015–2019).

Merchant has performed as a stand-up comedian, which led to him writing and starring in the HBO series Hello Ladies (2013–2014), based on his stand-up material. He starred in his first play, Richard Bean's The Mentalists, at London's Wyndham's Theatre in 2015. He wrote and directed the film Fighting with My Family in 2019, and starred in, co-wrote, co-produced, and co-directed the comedy crime series The Outlaws (2021–2024). He also appeared as the mutant Caliban in the superhero film Logan (2017), a Nazi Gestapo leader in the comedy-drama film Jojo Rabbit (2019), and as the serial killer Stephen Port in the 2022 television drama Four Lives.

Merchant has received numerous accolades, including a Peabody Award, two Golden Globe Awards, three BAFTA Awards, a Primetime Emmy Award, four British Comedy Awards, and the Rose d'Or.

== Early life and education ==
"I don't remember where I got this grand idea that I could somehow be John Cleese. That was my overriding passion from my mid-teens. John Cleese had grown up in Weston-super-Mare, not far from Bristol, where I grew up, and he was tall and he was very funny and very British and it's almost like I thought, 'Well if they want tall people from the West Country, I can do that.'"

— Merchant in December 2019

Stephen James Merchant was born in the Hanham suburb of Bristol on 24 November 1974, the son of nursery nurse Jane Elaine (née Hibbs) and plumber and builder Ronald John Merchant. He attended Hanham Secondary School and later the University of Warwick in Coventry from 1993 to 1996, where he graduated with a BA in Film and Literature with a 2:1. He worked as a film reviewer on the student radio station Radio Warwick, where he began his broadcasting career. His group there included film critic James King. A number of tapes of The Steve Show were rediscovered and have been published on various Merchant fan sites.

Merchant was inspired to get into comedy by John Cleese. In 2019, he said that he had never met Cleese, but that his parents had recently met him on a cruise and asked him to sign a book for Merchant; they also recorded a voicemail message on the phone in their cabin, which consisted of Cleese saying: "Hello there, Mr and Mrs Merchant, I'd be more than happy to sign your book. I was just wondering is your Stephen Merchant the same Stephen Merchant who collaborated with Ricky Gervais on The Office? Because I'm an enormous fan and please pass on my best regards." On hearing this, Merchant said, "I don't feel I need to meet him now. That's all I needed."

== Career ==
=== Early career ===
Merchant began his career performing stand-up comedy at Bristol's Comedy Box, while he "bummed around for a year or so, temping in a series of tedious day jobs." At the comedy venue, he recalled: "The first week I did really well. The second week I died on my arse. I realised that stand-up was not that easy after all." He also appeared as a contestant on a 1997 episode of the TV game show Blockbusters and worked for a short time as a DJ for Radio Caroline.

Merchant met Ricky Gervais in 1997 when Gervais (in the position of Head of Speech at the radio station XFM London), hired Merchant as his assistant. Gervais later said that he had called Merchant for an interview because it was the first CV handed to him. Merchant and Gervais hosted a Saturday afternoon radio show together from January to August 1998, when both of them left XFM as it was bought by the Capital Radio Group. In the same year, Merchant was a finalist at The Daily Telegraph Open Mic Awards.

Merchant worked for seven months at XFM 104.9. The Saturday show never had a large audience. Gervais said: "It's a tinpot radio station... It's not even the biggest radio station in the building." He created the features 'Hip Hop Hooray', 'Make Ricky Gervais Laugh' and 'Song for the Ladies'. After leaving XFM, Merchant began a production course at the BBC. As part of his coursework, he enlisted Gervais to perform in a 30-minute short film, "Seedy Boss", which became the earliest inspiration for their mock documentary The Office. They collaborated on a sitcom pilot called Golden Years featuring a manager suffering a mid-life crisis. It aired on Channel 4's Comedy Lab series in September 1998, but the show failed to find further success.

=== The Office and return to XFM ===
In mid-2001, BBC Two aired the first series of The Office, co-written and co-directed by Merchant and Gervais and starring the latter as paper sales office manager David Brent; the show initially received low ratings. Beginning in September 2001, Merchant and Gervais returned to XFM as co-hosts of The Ricky Gervais Show, another Saturday afternoon programme, which led to their fruitful relationship with producer Karl Pilkington.

They took a break from the radio show in mid-2002 in order to film the second series of The Office, which aired that year; in addition to writing and directing the show, Merchant made a cameo performance in the episode "Charity" as a friend of Gareth Keenan's character and known by the name Oggy or Oggmonster. Merchant's father also appeared in multiple episodes as an office handyman named Gordon. Merchant also directed a sitcom pilot called The Last Chancers, which aired on Comedy Lab in November 2002 and became a five-part series broadcast in December on E4.

Merchant and Gervais continued to host The Ricky Gervais Show through 2003, taking another break to film The Office Christmas special, which aired that December. The radio show went off the air indefinitely in January 2004. During 2004, Merchant appeared in a recurring role as a chef on Garth Marenghi's Darkplace and in a cameo on Green Wing, and served as a script associate on the Chris Morris and Charlie Brooker sitcom Nathan Barley. The same year, The Office aired in the U.S. to critical acclaim. It went on to win the Golden Globe Award for Best Television Series – Musical or Comedy which both Merchant and Gervais accepted. This was followed in 2005 by a 4th series of the radio show, consisting of six episodes.

=== U.S. series of The Office ===
In March 2005, the American version of The Office premiered, with Merchant and Gervais credited as executive producers. They co-wrote the third-season episode "The Convict", and Merchant directed the fifth-season episode "Customer Survey".

=== Podcast series ===
In December 2005, with sponsorship by The Guardian, Merchant, Gervais, and Pilkington began recording a weekly podcast (also called The Ricky Gervais Show). Throughout its first series (through 20 February 2006), it was consistently ranked the most popular in the world, and was certified as the most-downloaded of all time by Guinness World Records. Two more series and three special installments (the "Podfather Trilogy") were recorded in 2006, with the final episode released on Christmas Eve. In late 2008, they recorded four more podcasts and began a series of audiobooks examining Pilkington's perspective on various subjects.

=== Extras ===
In July 2005, following a brief return of the XFM radio show (filling in for Adam and Joe), Gervais and Merchant's new sitcom Extras premiered on BBC Two. It features Merchant in a supporting role as Darren Lamb, the incompetent agent to struggling actor Andy Millman, played by Gervais. Series 2 of Extras aired in late 2006, followed by a Christmas special in December 2007; all three installments aired on HBO in the United States. Merchant won a 2006 British Comedy Award for Best TV Actor for his performance as Lamb, and the series won a Rose d'Or for Best Sitcom in 2006 and a Golden Globe for Best Television Series – Musical or Comedy in 2008.

=== The Steve Show ===
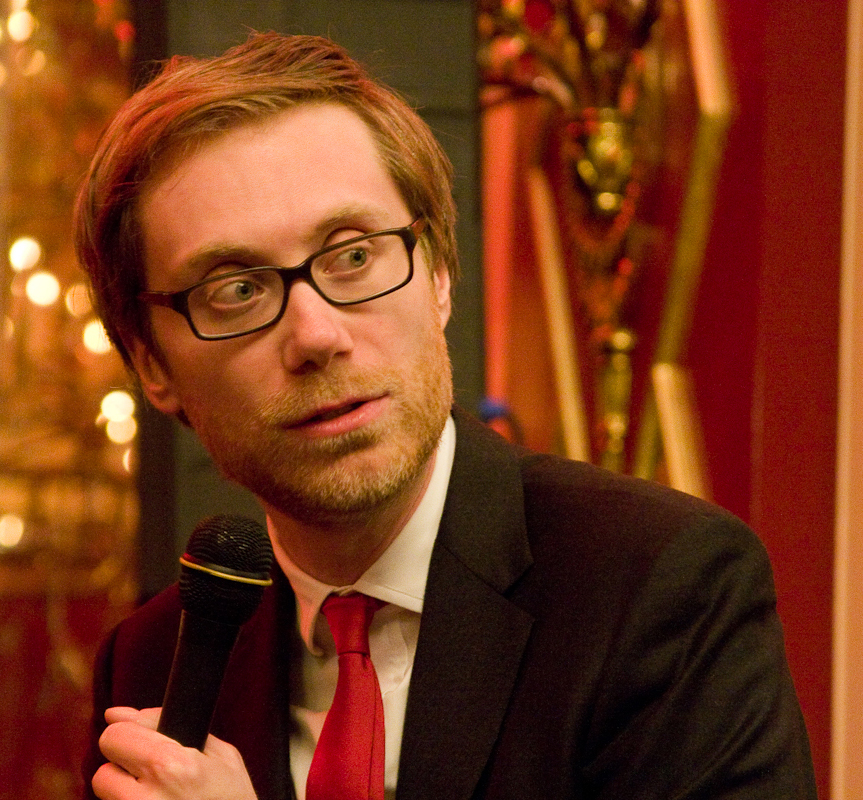
Merchant in January 2011

In January 2007, Merchant began hosting his own radio show on BBC 6 Music, airing weekly on Sunday afternoons. Instead of comedy, The Steve Show focused on toast and music, particularly "new music", defined by Merchant as "music you've not heard before." Many of the songs on the show were suggested by listeners or co-presenters. It also featured several of his friends, including his housemate, his childhood friend, and actor Rufus Gerrard-Wright (who also appeared in an episode of Extras). A spring search for a "she-J" resulted in the addition of former Byker Grove actor Sammy T. Dobson joining the ensemble. "The Steve Show" aired for four series and concluded in May 2009.

=== Stand-up ===
Merchant began performing stand-up comedy in the late 1990s to critical success, though he decided to focus more on his work with writing partner Ricky Gervais after the success of The Office. He appeared in a revue, called Rubbernecker, at the Café Royal, as part of the 2001 Edinburgh Fringe, alongside Ricky Gervais, Jimmy Carr and Robin Ince.

Merchant returned to stand-up with a nationwide tour of the United Kingdom in September 2011, under the title Hello Ladies. The tour, which ended in New York, was later released on DVD. In late 2012, it continued in Australia and New Zealand. Merchant performed his first-ever stand-up tour of Scandinavia in October 2014, performing in 11 different cities as part of a European festival circuit. In an interview with Marc Maron, Merchant listed Eddie Izzard, Stewart Lee, Ross Noble and Jimmy Carr as stand-up comedians he admired and John Cleese as his main comedic influence.

=== Hello Ladies ===
Merchant's sitcom Hello Ladies premiered on 29 September 2013 on HBO, in which he played Stuart Pritchard, a website designer in Los Angeles who unsuccessfully chases beautiful women. It was adapted from his stand-up show of the same name and written by Merchant, Lee Eisenberg and Gene Stupnitsky. After its initial run of eight episodes, HBO did not renew the show for a second season but aired a special movie on 22 November 2014, that served as the series' last episode.

=== Other work ===
Merchant has played small roles in the films Hot Fuzz (2007), Run Fatboy Run (2007), and The Invention of Lying (2009). He has a supporting role in the 2010 film Tooth Fairy. On television, Merchant made a cameo appearance in a non-speaking role on the sixth-season premiere of 24; he also starred as a sports commentator in the unaired pilot No Skillz. In 2009, Merchant and Gervais collaborated on the film Cemetery Junction, set in working-class England in the 1970s, which received mixed reviews on release in 2010.

Later in 2010, Gervais and Merchant wrote, and had cameo roles in, Life's Too Short, a television show starring Warwick Davis. For television, Merchant and Gervais also produced An Idiot Abroad. In 2011, Merchant lent his voice to the CGI film Gnomeo & Juliet and had a role in the Farrelly brothers' comedy Hall Pass. In 2013 he starred in I Give It a Year as the best man.

On 18 October 2013, he hosted an episode of the panel show Have I Got News for You and was featured in Short Poppies. In 2014 he made an appearance in Modern Family's "Las Vegas" episode.

In January 2011, Merchant appeared alongside many other comedians at the 'Free Fringe Benefit' at the Bloomsbury Theatre, London, in a show of stand-up to benefit the Free Fringe at the Edinburgh Comedy Festival.

Merchant is the voice of Wheatley in Valve's 2011 video game Portal 2, a role which earned him widespread acclaim among reviewers. He has stated that while the project was "exhausting", he is also "very pleased by the response people have had to it. What I was really pleased by how people seemed to respond to it in the way they do with a movie they've enjoyed, or a TV show they've enjoyed." In 2013, he reprised this role as the voice of the Ap-Sap in Team Fortress 2, a weapon based on the Wheatley core.

Merchant has provided the voice-over since 2009 of advertisements for Barclays and Waterstones. In 2014, he starred in two commercials for Newcastle Brown Ale and for the Cadillac 2015 ATS Coupe.

He is an executive producer for the Spike show Lip Sync Battle and, in July 2015, Merchant opened his first play, The Mentalists by Richard Bean, alongside Steffan Rhodri in London's West End. He appeared in three episodes of The Big Bang Theory as Dave Gibbs, a guy Amy dates after she breaks up with Sheldon.

He has portrayed George Washington and Abraham Lincoln on the Comedy Central series Drunk History.

He hosted a special celebrity edition of the cult UK game show The Crystal Maze, on Channel 4 on 16 October 2016, in aid of the network's Stand Up to Cancer campaign in partnership with Cancer Research UK.

In 2017, Merchant played Caliban in the X-Men movie Logan. Merchant, along with John Krasinski and Allyson Seeger, are executive producers of Dream Corp, LLC, an animated series created by Daniel Stessen on Adult Swim that ran for three seasons starting in 2016.

On 31 March 2018, Merchant was a guest announcer on Ant & Dec's Saturday Night Takeaway. On Christmas Eve 2018, Merchant appeared with Asim Chaudhry in odd-couple Christmas road-trip comedy Click & Collect on BBC One. Merchant also appeared as Nazi Gestapo leader Captain Deertz in director Taika Waititi's Oscar-winning Jojo Rabbit.

In 2019, Merchant wrote and directed Fighting with My Family, a biographical sports comedy-drama film, based on the 2012 documentary The Wrestlers: Fighting with My Family by Max Fisher. The film depicts the career of English professional wrestler Saraya Bevis as she makes her way up WWE, and starred Florence Pugh and Jack Lowden, as well as Dwayne Johnson (who also served as a co-producer). Fighting with My Family grossed $41.5 million worldwide against a budget of $11 million.

In 2021, Merchant appeared in The Outlaws, a crime thriller comedy drama set in Bristol, which he also co-created, co-wrote, co-produced, and co-directed. A second series aired in 2022 and a third in 2024.

Merchant portrayed serial killer Stephen Port in the 2022 BBC drama Four Lives.

== Personal life ==
Since December 2018 Merchant has been in a relationship with American actress Mircea Monroe. They live in a home previously owned by Ellen DeGeneres in the Nichols Canyon area of Los Angeles. He also owns a home in London.

Standing 6 ft 7 in (2.01 m) tall with a lanky frame, Merchant once had his dance moves likened by Ricky Gervais to an "upright lizard being given electroshock treatment." Gervais also described him as a "stick insect with funny glasses" and Beaker from The Muppet Show. Karl Pilkington described Merchant's dancing as a "bit of weird art" but has since "got used to him", while Russell Brand likened him to a "graceful grasshopper". Merchant has said that he prefers to liken himself to footballer Peter Crouch, who is the same height, and he once impersonated Crouch in a BBC sketch broadcast as part of the pre-match build-up to England's quarter-final game against Portugal at the 2006 World Cup.

Before the 2010 UK general election, Merchant was one of 48 celebrities who signed a letter opposing the Conservative Party's policy on the BBC.

In December 2019, Merchant was the guest for an episode of BBC Radio 4's Desert Island Discs. His book choice was Roger's Profanisaurus by Roger Mellie from Viz, his luxury item was a piano, and his chosen record was "Thunder Road" by Bruce Springsteen.

== Filmography ==
=== Film ===
Key
†	Denotes works that have not yet been released

Year	Title	Actor	Director	Writer	Producer	Role	Notes
2007	Hot Fuzz	Yes	No	No	No	Peter Ian Staker	
2007	Run Fatboy Run	Yes	No	No	No	Man with Broken Leg	
2009	The Invention of Lying	Yes	No	No	No	Man at the Door	
2010	Tooth Fairy	Yes	No	No	No	Tracy	
2010	Cemetery Junction	Yes	Yes	Yes	Executive	Dougie Boden	Co-written and co-directed with Ricky Gervais
2010	Jackboots on Whitehall	Yes	No	No	No	Tom	Voice role
2010	Burke and Hare	Yes	No	No	No	Holyrood Footman	
2011	Gnomeo & Juliet	Yes	No	No	No	Paris	Voice role
2011	Hall Pass	Yes	No	No	No	Gary Putney	
2013	Movie 43	Yes	No	No	No	Donald	Segment: "Truth or Dare"
2013	I Give It a Year	Yes	No	No	No	Danny	
2017	Logan	Yes	No	No	No	Caliban	
2017	Beauty and the Beast	Yes	No	No	No	Monsieur Toilette	Voice role, Deleted scene
2017	Table 19	Yes	No	No	No	Walter Thimble	
2018	Sherlock Gnomes	Yes	No	No	No	Paris	Voice role
2018	The Girl in the Spider's Web	Yes	No	No	No	Frans Balder	
2018	Click & Collect	Yes	No	No	No	Andrew Bennett	
2019	Fighting with My Family	Yes	Yes	Yes	Yes	Hugh	
2019	Good Boys	Yes	No	No	No	Claude	Uncredited cameo
2019	Jojo Rabbit	Yes	No	No	No	Captain Deertz	
2021	Locked Down	Yes	No	No	No	Michael Morgan	
2021	A Boy Called Christmas	Yes	No	No	No	Miika the Mouse	Voice role
2025	Goodbye June	Yes	No	No	No	Jerry	
TBA	Untitled film †	Yes	Yes	Yes	Yes	TBA	Filming
TBA	The Ark and the Aardvark †	Yes	No	No	No	Croc	Voice role; in production

=== Television ===
Year	Title	Actor	Director	Writer	Executive Producer	Creator	Role	Notes
1999	Comedy Lab	Yes	No	Yes	No	No	James (voice)	Episode: "Golden Years"
2000	Meet Ricky Gervais	Yes	No	Yes	No	No	Various roles	Also writer
2001–2003	The Office (UK)	Yes	Yes	Yes	Yes	Yes	Paul Shepherd (voice) / Nathan (aka "The Oggmonster", "Oggy")	14 episodes and appeared in 3 episodes; co-created, co-written and co-directed with Ricky Gervais
2004	Garth Marenghi's Darkplace	Yes	No	No	No	No	Chef	2 episodes
2004	Green Wing	Yes	No	No	No	No	Lab Technician	Episode: "Tests"
2005	Bromwell High	Yes	No	No	No	No	Mr. Phillips (voice)	13 episodes
2005–2007	Extras	Yes	Yes	Yes	Yes	Yes	Darren Lamb	13 episodes and appeared in 11 episodes; Co-created, co-written and co-directed with Ricky Gervais
2005–2013	The Office (US)	No	Yes	Yes	Yes	Yes	—N/a	American remake of his show The Office co-created with Ricky Gervais; directed episode: "Customer Survey" and co-wrote "The Convict" with Ricky Gervais
2007	24	Yes	No	No	No	No	CTU Technician	Episode: "Day 6: 6:00 a.m.-7:00 a.m."
2010–2012	The Ricky Gervais Show	Yes	No	No	Yes	Yes	Himself (voice)	39 episodes; co-created with Ricky Gervais and Karl Pilkington
2010–2011	An Idiot Abroad	Yes	No	No	Yes	No	Himself	16 episodes
2011–2013	Life's Too Short	Yes	Yes	Yes	Yes	Yes	Himself	8 episodes; co-created with Ricky Gervais and Warwick Davis; Co-written and co-directed with Ricky Gervais
2011	Ronnie Corbett's Comedy Britain	Yes	No	No	Yes	No	Himself	
2013	Hello Ladies	Yes	Yes	Yes	Yes	Yes	Stuart Pritchard	8 episodes; co-created and co-written with Lee Eisenberg and Gene Stupnitsky
2013–2015	Drunk History	Yes	No	No	No	No	Abraham Lincoln / George Washington	3 episodes
2014, 2020	Modern Family	Yes	No	No	No	No	Higgins	2 episodes
2014	Robot Chicken	Yes	No	No	No	No	Alfred Pennyworth / 210 Up Narrator / Kirk Fogg (voices)	Episode: "Stone Cold Steve Cold Stone"
2014	Hello Ladies: The Movie	Yes	Yes	Yes	Yes	Yes	Stuart Pritchard	Television film; co-created and co-written with Lee Eisenberg and Gene Stupnitsky
2014	Short Poppies	Yes	No	No	No	No	Insurance Broker	Episode: "Terry Pole"
2015	The Big Bang Theory	Yes	No	No	No	No	Dave Gibbs	3 episodes
2015–2019	Lip Sync Battle	Yes	No	No	Yes	Yes	Himself	Appears in 2 episodes
2016	The Simpsons	Yes	No	No	No	No	Conrad (voice)	Episode: "The Girl Code"
2016	Donald Trump's The Art of the Deal: The Movie	Yes	No	No	No	No	Barron Hilton	Television film
2016	American Dad!	Yes	No	No	No	No	Scientist (voice)	Episode: "The 200"
2016	The Crystal Maze	Yes	No	No	No	No	Himself (host)	Television special
2016–2020	Dream Corp LLC	Yes	No	No	Yes	No	T.E.R.R.Y.	28 episodes
2018	The Good Place	Yes	No	No	No	No	Neil	Episode: "Janet(s)"
2018	Click & Collect	Yes	No	No	No	No	Andrew	Christmas TV special
2020	Home Movie: The Princess Bride	Yes	No	No	No	No	Count Rugen	2 episodes
2021–2024	The Outlaws	Yes	Yes	Yes	Yes	Yes	Greg	17 episodes; directed 3 episodes and wrote 9 episodes
2022	Four Lives	Yes	No	No	No	No	Stephen Port	3 episodes
2022	Big Fat Quiz of the Year	No	No	No	No	No	Panelist	With Richard Ayoade
2024	BAFTA TV Awards	No	No	No	No	No	Guest award announcer	
2025–present	The Paper	No	No	No	Yes	No	—N/a	Follow-up and spinoff to the American remake of his show The Office co-created with Ricky Gervais
2025	The Walking Dead: Daryl Dixon	Yes	No	No	No	No	Julian Chamberlain	Episode: "Costa da Morte"
2026	Ludwig	Yes	No	No	No	No	Danny Sloane	One episode

=== Radio ===
Year	Title	Station	Role	Notes	Ref
1998	The Ricky Gervais Show	XFM	Self, co-host	Presented with Ricky Gervais	
2001–2005	The Ricky Gervais Show	XFM	Self, co-host	Presented with Ricky Gervais and Karl Pilkington	
2007–2009	The Steve Show	BBC Radio 6 Music	Self, host		

=== Podcasts ===
Year	Title	Role	Notes
2013-2023	RHLSTP with Richard Herring	Self	3 episodes
2014	Dish	Self	Episode: "Stephen Merchant, smoked mackerel with spinach baked eggs and a rosé"
2016	Norm Macdonald Live	Self	Episode: "Stephen Merchant"
2019	Armchair Expert with Dax Shepard	Self	Episode: "Stephen Merchant"
2021; 2026	Office Ladies	Self	2 episodes
2022	Conan O'Brien Needs a Friend	Self	Episode: "Stephen Merchant"
2024	Russell Howard's Five Brilliant Things	Self	Episode: "Stephen Merchant"
2025	How to Fail with Elizabeth Day	Self	Episode: "Stephen Merchant: ‘Most famous people are f**cked up’"
2025	Where Everybody Knows Your Name with Ted Danson & Woody Harrelson	Self	Episode: "Stephen Merchant"
2025	The Blocks Podcast with Neal Brennan	Self	Episode: "Stephen Merchant"
2025	The Romesh Ranganathan Show	Self	Episode: "Stephen Merchant: Letting Go Of The Office & Being The Awkward Guy"

=== Video games ===
Year	Title	Voice role
2011	Portal 2	Wheatley
2013	Team Fortress 2 (uncredited)	Wheatley
2015	Lego Dimensions	Wheatley

== Awards ==
Awarding Body/Event	Awarded
Academy of Interactive Arts & Sciences	2011 Outstanding Character Performance - Wheatley (Portal 2)
Banff Television Festival	2006 Best Comedy Program - Extras; 2008 Best Comedy Program - Extras
British Academy Television Awards	2002 Situation Comedy Award - The Office (UK); 2003 Situation Comedy Award - The Office (UK); 2004 Situation Comedy Award - The Office (UK)
British Comedy Awards	2006 Best TV Comedy Actor - Darren Lamb (Extras)
Broadcasting Press Guild Awards	2002 Writer's Award - The Office (UK); 2003 Writer's Award - The Office (UK)
CinEuphoria Awards	2021 Best Ensemble (International Competition) - Jojo Rabbit
Golden Globe Awards	2003 Best Television Series (Musical or Comedy) - The Office (UK); 2007 Best Television Series (Musical or Comedy) - Extras
Hawaii Film Critics Society	2020 Best First Film - Fighting with My Family
Peabody Awards	2004 Peabody Award - The Office (UK)
Primetime Emmy Awards	2006 Outstanding Comedy Series - The Office (U.S.)
Spike Video Game Awards	2011 Best Performance by a Human Male - Wheatley (Portal 2)
Television Critics Association	2004 Individual Achievement in Comedy - The Office (UK)
Writers Guild of America Awards	2007 Comedy Series - The Office (US)
