= The Mentalists =

Play written by Richard Bean

The Mentalists is a play by English playwright Richard Bean. The action takes place in a budget hotel room in Finsbury Park and consists of two long scenes between only two characters.

It premiered at Royal National Theatre in 2002, directed by Sean Holmes, starring Michael Feast as Ted and Duncan Preston as Morrie.

In July 2015, it was revived at Wyndham's Theatre, produced by Old Vic Productions and Steven Harris directed by Abbey Wright, starring Stephen Merchant as Ted and Steffan Rhodri as Morrie.
