= Science (film) =

- Directed by: Dominic Brigstocke
- Written by: Ricky Gervais
- Produced by: Celia Moore
- Starring: Ricky Gervais
- Edited by: Richard Halladey
- Production company: Universal Pictures
- Release date: 22 November 2010
- Running time: 78 minutes
- Country: United Kingdom
- Language: English

Science is a stand-up comedy show by British comedian Ricky Gervais. It was filmed in 2010 at the Hammersmith Apollo, and released on DVD in November that year.

== Reception ==
Science opened to little critical praise. Writing for The Independent, Julian Hall gave the show two stars out of five, stating that it was Gervais's "most disappointing" offering yet.
