= Las muertas =

1977 novel by Jorge Ibargüengoitia

The Dead Girls
- Cover of the first edition
- Author: Jorge Ibargüengoitia
- Original title: Las muertas
- Translator: Asa Zatz
- Cover artist: Joy Laville (1st Spanish ed.)
- Language: Spanish
- Genre: Novel
- Set in: Central Mexico, 1950s/1960s
- Publisher: Joaquín Mortiz (orig.), Chatto & Windus/Avon Books (transl.)
- Publication date: 1977
- Publication place: Mexico City
- English publication date: 1982
- Pages: 156
- ISBN: 968-27-0291-7 (Mortiz)
- Preceded by: Estas ruinas que ves
- Followed by: Dos crímenes

Las muertas is a 1977 novel by Mexican author Jorge Ibargüengoitia, originally published in Spanish by Joaquín Mortiz in Mexico City. Asa Zatz's English translation The Dead Girls was first published in 1982 by Chatto & Windus in the United Kingdom and by Avon Books in the United States and was reprinted by Picador Classics in 2018.

Published between Estas ruinas que ves (1975) and Dos crímenes (1979), it is considered a part of Ibargüengoitia's Plan de Abajo trilogy: three novels set in the fictional state of the same name, which resembles the author's home state of Guanajuato.

Cover art for the first edition was taken from a painting by Joy Laville, Ibargüengoitia's wife.

== Development ==
Ibargüengoitia began work on the novel in 1965, after the 1964 trial of the González Valenzuela sisters – dubbed Las Poquianchis in the scandalous press coverage that ensued – who ran a prostitution and human-trafficking ring in Guanajuato and on whose property scores of bodies were found.

Over the 13 years it took him to write it, the book went through several different versions. The first, titled El libro de las Poquianchis – completed in 1965 but unpublished – was a factual linear chronicle in which Ibargüengoitia sought to challenge the sensationalist and often exaggerated coverage provided by the popular press, particularly the weekly ¡Alarma!, to identify shortcomings in the legal proceedings, and to cast light on the social and economic conditions behind the case. The author described it as 100 pages that were "neither a reportage nor an essay nor a novel" and resolved to rewrite it as a novel. (Note: The published book opens with an epigraph explaining that "Some of the events narrated herein are real. All the characters are imaginary.")

Between 1965 and 1975, he worked intermittently (Note: Estas ruinas que ves was written during one hiatus in 1973–1974.) on the project, fictionalising the locations and characters' names, introducing a non-linear structure, and experimenting alternatively with a first-person autobiographical narrative, using an omniscient fictional narrator, and having each chapter narrated by a different character. The final, published version of Las muertas was written in 1976, completed in the United States while he was attending the University of Iowa's international writing programme.

== Plot ==
Still loosely based on the real-life case of Las Poquianchis, the novel tells the story of the Baladro sisters and the three brothels they run in Plan de Abajo and the neighbouring state of Mezcala during the late 1950s and early 1960s. It opens in December 1963 – towards the end of the story – when Serafina, the youngest sister, in an act of vengeance, opens fire on a bakery owned by Simón Corona, her former lover. Simón reports the attack to the authorities, which triggers the downfall of the sisters' business empire, the story of which is told in a non-linear narrative over 17 chapters. It concludes with the court convicting the guilty parties to lengthy prison terms for a string of crimes and ordering the surrender of their properties to pay due compensation to their nine surviving victims. The appendices include an authentic photograph of the González Valenzuela sisters and some of the prostitutes they employed, their faces erased and replaced with numbers identifying them as the characters in the novel.

== Adaptations ==
An eight-hour radionovela based on the novel, adapted by Carmen Limón and produced by Guadalupe Cortés, was first broadcast on Radio Educación in 1990.

An adaptation for the theatre titled Las muertas de Jorge Ibargüengoitia, written and directed by Guanajuato-born Luis Martín Solís and performed by students of the Universidad Veracruzana, was staged in Xalapa, Veracruz, and Monterrey, Nuevo León, in 2015. Solís's play was performed again in Guanajuato in 2020 and in Coahuila in 2022.

A six-part television adaptation of the novel, directed by Luis Estrada, was released on Netflix in September 2025.

Felipe Cazals's 1976 film Las Poquianchis is not based on Ibargüengoitia's novel, despite occasionally being advertised as such.
