= Rosa Sabater =

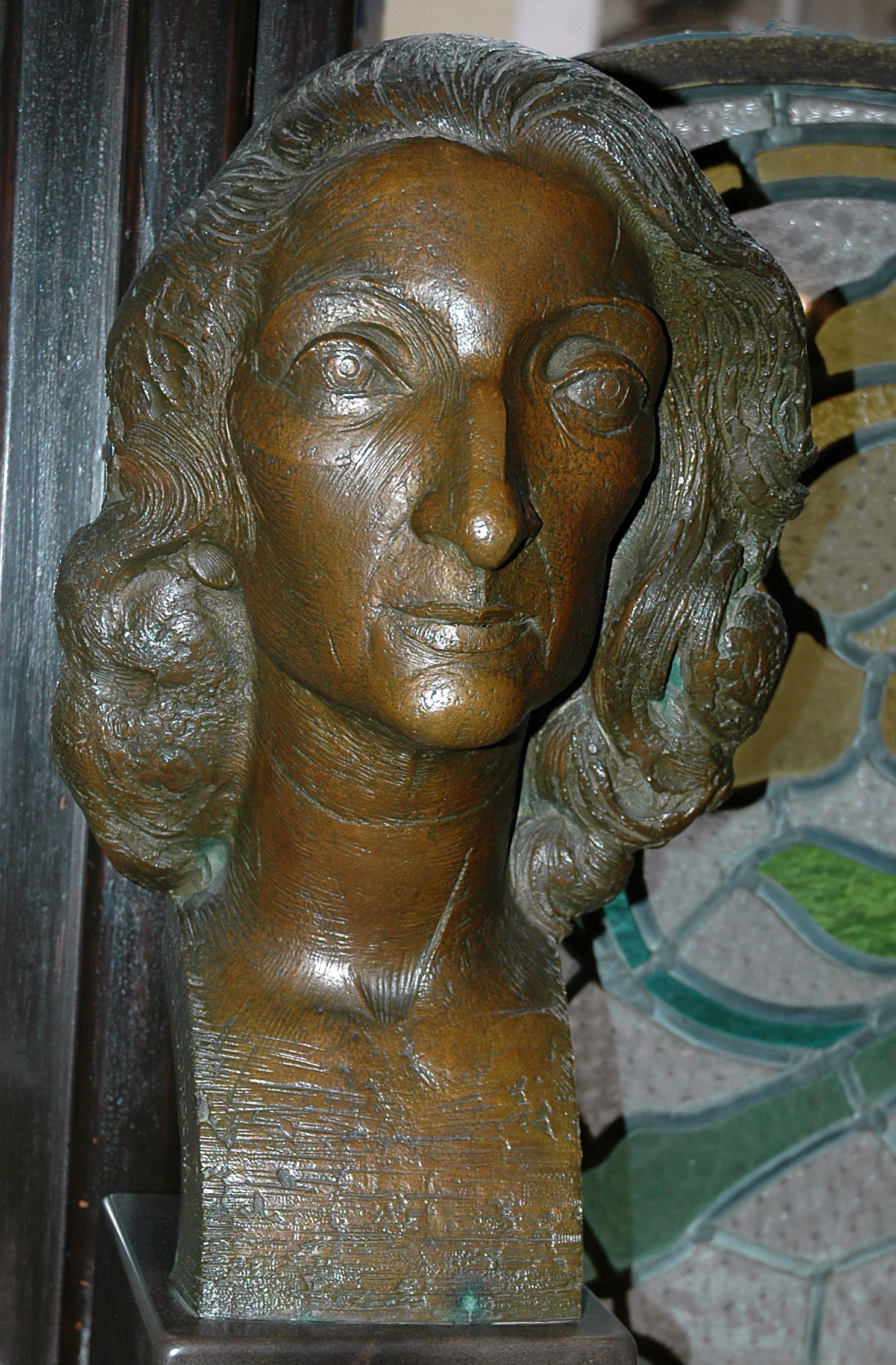
Bust of Rosa Sabater in the Palau de la Música, Barcelona

Rosa Sabater i Parera (Catalan: [ˈrɔzə səβəˈte], Spanish: [ˈrosa saβaˈteɾ]; Barcelona, Spain, 29 August 1929 – Mejorada del Campo, Spain, 27 November 1983) was a Spanish pianist. She was a pupil of Frank Marshall (1883-1959), who headed the Academia Marshall in Barcelona, formerly the Academia Granados.

In 1982 she served on the jury of the Paloma O'Shea Santander International Piano Competition.

Rosa Sabater won the Creu de Sant Jordi Prize in 1983; shortly afterwards, she was killed in the Avianca Flight 011 crash.
