= The Lightning of August =

1964 novel by Jorge Ibargüengoitia

- Cover of the first edition.
- Author: Jorge Ibargüengoitia
- Original title: Los relámpagos de agosto
- Translator: Irene del Corral
- Language: Spanish
- Genre: Political satire
- Publisher: Casa de las Américas (original)
- Publication date: 1964
- Publication place: Mexico
- English publication date: 1986
- OCLC: 341335
- LC Class: PQ7298.19.B3

Los relámpagos de agosto (officially translated as The Lightning of August) is the first novel written by Mexican author Jorge Ibargüengoitia.

Published for the first time in 1964, the text parodies the memories written by veterans of the 1910 Mexican Revolution and the armed revolts that continued to destabilize the country for the next two decades. Since many of those veterans had joined the Institutional Revolutionary Party (PRI) —a political organization that had ruled Mexico by rigging elections and engaging in massive corruption and cronyism for most of the 20th century— the topic was still considered off-limits by the governing regime (and the literary critics that sympathized with it) at the time of its publication.

Critically, the novel went on to receive the 1964 Casa de las Américas annual prize. It has also been distributed among Mexican public schools through the National Reading Program and it was selected by the Guadalajara International Book Fair to celebrate the 2010 World Book Day.

== Plot ==
Fictional Army General José Guadalupe "Lupe" Arroyo, a veteran of the 1910 Mexican Revolution, attempts to dispel all sorts of "defamatory claims" made by his political rivals and tries to explain the plainly incompetent political and military strategies devised by him and his associates.

== Style ==
In the novel, Ibargüengoitia caricaturizes the solemn language and rhetoric frequently found in some autobiographical memoirs of the period. Except in a few instances where the passage at hand is not controversial, most characters, cities, and even states are entirely fictional, as the author tried to avert a direct confrontation with members of the ruling party.

== Publication ==
According to the author, he finished writing the novel in 1963 —some twenty years before his untimely death in a plane accident. The first edition consisted of 10,000 copies printed in May 1964 by Casa de las Américas in Havana, Cuba, celebrating its winning entry for best novel in its annual prize. In Mexico, it was first available until May 1965 through Joaquín Mortiz; a publishing house acquired by Grupo Planeta in 1983. Most covers used by Planeta through both its Joaquín Mortiz and Booket imprints include a painting by his widow, British-born artist Joy Laville.

As for its English edition, Ibargüengoitia negotiated a translation with Dr. Jack Robert in 1970 but, according to Víctor Díaz Arciniega, it was never completed. In 1986, Irene del Corral became the first official translator and her version was published by Bard/Avon Books (New York) under the title The Lightning of August. The same translation was adapted to British English and published in the United Kingdom by Chatto & Windus (1986).

In total, the novel has been translated into seven languages.
