= Jorge Ibargüengoitia =

Mexican novelist and playwright (1928-83)

- Born: Jorge Ibargüengoitia Antillón; 22 January 1928; Guanajuato, Guanajuato, Mexico
- Died: 27 November 1983 (aged 55); Mejorada del Campo, Madrid, Spain
- Education: National Autonomous University of Mexico (UNAM)
- Occupation: Writer
- Spouse: Joy Laville
- Writing career
- Language: Spanish
- Period: 1964–1983
- Genre: Novel
- Notable works: Los relámpagos de agosto (1964), Las muertas (1977)

Jorge Ibargüengoitia Antillón (January 22, 1928 – November 27, 1983) was a Mexican novelist and playwright who achieved great popular and critical success with his satires, three of which have appeared in English: The Dead Girls, Two Crimes, and The Lightning of August. His plays include Susana y los Jóvenes and Ante varias esfinges, both dating from the 1950s. His work also includes short stories and chronicles. He is considered one of the most influential writers in Latin American literature.

Ibargüengoitia was born in Guanajuato, Mexico. In 1955, he received a Rockefeller grant to study in New York City; five years later he received the Mexico City literary award. He died in Avianca Flight 011, which crashed on November 27, 1983, while it attempted to land in Madrid, Spain.

== Biography ==
Jorge Ibargüengoitia was born in 1928 in the city of Guanajuato. His father, Alejandro Ibargüengoitia Cumming, died when he was eight months old. His mother, María de la Luz Antillón, moved with Jorge to Mexico City to be close to her family after losing her husband, so Ibargüengoitia was brought up by his mother and by other women of her family. During his early education, he studied in schools that belonged to the Marist Brothers and was a boy scout. In 1947 he attended the 6th World Scout Jamboree, after which he travelled through France, Italy, Switzerland and England for three months. The painter Manuel Felguérez, a friend who went to the same trip, told years later that both had considered the trip an amazing experience and had decided that they should do something with their lives that allowed them to continue travelling.

Due to family pressure, Ibargüengoitia started studying engineering at National Autonomous University of Mexico (UNAM) in 1945, although he dropped out in 1949 before finishing his studies. He wrote: "I grew up surrounded by women who adored me. They wanted me to be an engineer: they had had money, but had lost it and hoped I would make up for it [...] When I had two years left to finish the engineering degree, I decided to drop out to focus on writing. The women of the house spent 15 years bemoaning that decision [...] Later on they got used to it." After dropping out, he moved back to the state of Guanajuato, where his family still had lands.

During that time, Ibargüengoitia met Salvador Novo, who was mounting a play at the Teatro Juárez in the city of Guanajuato. This meeting caused such an impression on Ibargüengoitia that he decided to return to Mexico City and enrol at the Faculty of Philosophy at UNAM, where he graduated with a specialization in Dramatic Arts. One of his teachers was Rodolfo Usigli.

After he finished his studies, Ibargüengoitia started teaching. He even got his teacher Rodolfo Usigli's position, together with Luisa Josefina Hernández, when Usigli retired. He started to apply for and win scholarships too, including a Rockefeller scholarship for a stay in New York in 1955, to continue with his literary career.

Ibargüengoitia moved to a house in Coyoacán, Mexico City, in 1957 together with his mother and aunt. He met the artist Joy Laville in 1963 or 1964 in a bookstore in San Miguel de Allende, Guanajuato, and got married in 1973 after a few years together. They lived in Coyoacán until the death of Ibargüengoitia's mother, after which they decided to travel around Europe. They settled permanently in Paris in 1980.

== Literary career ==
=== Theatre ===
While he was still a student of Dramatic Arts, in 1953, Ibargüengoitia wrote several plays to moderate acclaim, but which seemed to promise a successful career in theatre, such as Susana y los jóvenes, La lucha con el ángel, Clotilde en su casa, the children's comedy El peluquero del rey, Llegó Margó and Ante varias esfinges. After graduation he continued writing plays, although they had much less success; in 1959 he wrote the comedies El viaje superficial and Pájaro en mano; in 1960 he wrote La conspiración vendida per Salvador Novo's request (even though it never premiered, Ibargüengoitia sent it to a literary contest under a pseudonym and won Mexico City's Prize), Los buenos manejos, La fuga de Nicanor, La farsa del valiente Nicolás and Rigoberto entre las ranas, and from 1961 is El amor de Sarita y el profesor Rocafuerte.

His already debilitated link to the theatre due to the lack of success with his plays got further damaged in the beginning of the 1960s when Rodolfo Usigli was asked in an interview by Elena Poniatowska to name his favourite students and he did not mention Ibargüengoitia. He took the snub to heart, as he was sure he had been one of the most distinguished students of Usigli's class.

Between 1961 and 1964 Ibargüengoitia wrote reviews of theatre plays for the Revista de la Universidad. His reviews were often controversial, as he was not afraid to write negative reviews on playwrights who were considered untouchable. His negative reviews of two plays by Alfonso Reyes caused such controversy in Mexican literary circles that Ibargüengoitia decided to leave the job.

In 1962 he wrote his last play, El atentado, with which he won the Casa de las Américas Prize.

=== Novels ===
During the 1950s, Ibargüengoitia started to read about the Mexican Revolution, particularly the autobiographies of many of the main people that took part in it. While he was doing research for El atentado, Ibargüengoitia got the idea to write a novel about the Mexican Revolution; this is how he came up with Los relámpagos de agosto (1964), a fictional story based on the last phase of the revolution and the forming of the political groups that would dominate Mexican politics for most of the twentieth century. The novel won the Casa de las Américas Prize in 1964, and in it, the style that would characterise most of his further work was already present: taking real-life stories and subjecting them to a whimsical, sardonic treatment.

His next book, La ley de Herodes (1967), is a collection of short stories, most of which are clearly based on details from his own life. He describes, among many other events, the misadventures of getting a mortgage in Mexico and his experiences at Columbia University's International House. Like his novels, these stories combine farce, sexual peccadilloes, and humor. Maten al león (1969), although set on an imaginary island, is a novel mirroring the Latin American dictatorships; its details are comic but the end is dark. Estas ruinas que ves (1975) is a farce based on realistic details of academic life that are still visible in early 21st-century Guanajuato: the clanging of church bells disconcerting a speaker, cutting the ribbon at museum openings, the set of cultural movers and shakers who have known each other since kindergarten.

For Las muertas (1977) he turned to the most outrageous criminals of his native state: the brothel-keepers Delfina and María de Jesús González, whose decade-long careers as serial killers emerged in 1964. Dos crímenes (1979) is a novel about a man who is being prosecuted by the police and runs away to hide in his rich uncle's house, where intrigue, suspicions and relationships unravel among he and his family members. His last novel, Los pasos de López, was published in 1982 and it is a fictional memoir whose characters are based on Miguel Hidalgo and the members of the Querétaro conspiracy of 1810. These three novels are unofficially called the "Plan de Abajo trilogy" because they all take place in the fictional region of Plan de Abajo, which is very similar to Ibargüengoitia's native state of Guanajuato.

Ibargüengoitia died before he finished his seventh novel, which would have been set in the period of the Second Mexican Empire of Maximilian I and Carlota. It was never published.

=== Weekly columns ===
Ibargüengoitia was also known for his weekly columns in the Mexico City newspaper Excélsior, and later on in the magazines Vuelta and Proceso, which have been collected in a half-dozen paperback volumes.

=== Influences and style ===
Ibargüengoitia cited Evelyn Waugh and Louis-Ferdinand Céline as his most influential authors.

He is considered one of the first writers who "demystified the contents of the history of Mexico" and humanised its heroic figures, through his use of irony, farce, humour and even grotesque depictions. The periods that most interested him were the Independence of Mexico and the Mexican Revolution.

Aside from historical periods, Ibargüengoitia often wrote about details, anecdotes and problems of his daily life. His native state of Guanajuato was also frequently used as a set for his stories, although he almost always used fictional names, such as Cuévano, Plan de Abajo, Muérdago or Pedrones, to stand in for it or its cities.

The writer has been quoted as saying he never meant to make anyone laugh, that he thought laughter was useless and a pointless waste of time.

== Death and legacy ==
In 1983, Ibargüengoitia was invited by Gabriel García Márquez to the First Encounter of Hispanic-American Culture in Bogotá, Colombia. Even though he had initially declined to attend, he changed his mind at the last minute and boarded Avianca Flight 011 that departed from Paris and was due to land in Madrid. The plane, a Boeing 747, crashed near the Madrid-Barajas airport as it attempted to land, on November 27, 1983. He perished along with Peruvian poet Manuel Scorza, Uruguayan critic Ángel Rama, Argentinian academic Marta Traba, and 177 others.

He is buried in Antillón Park in Guanajuato, named in honour of his great-grandfather General Florencio Antillón, and where a talavera plaque marks his remains. In translation, it says simply, "Here lies Jorge Ibargüengoitia in the park of his great-grandfather, who fought against the French."

According to his publisher, Ibargüengoitia's books are still well received in libraries and bookstores, and his work has received renewed attention in the past years thanks to the effort of scholars and writers like Juan Villoro and Sergio González Rodríguez. His personal archive is at the Firestone Library of Princeton University.

== Bibliography ==
=== Drama ===
- La lucha con el ángel (1955).
- Clotilde en su casa, also titled Un adulterio exquisito (1955). Published in Teatro mexicano del siglo XX. Mexico City: Fondo de Cultura Económica (1956).
- Ante varias esfinges (1959).
- El viaje superficial (1960). Published in Revista Mexicana de Literatura, June-September, 1960.
- La conspiración vendida (1960).
- El atentado (1963).
- Los buenos manejos (1980).
- Obras de Jorge Ibargüengoitia. Teatro I. Includes: «Susana y los jóvenes», «Clotilde en su casa» and «La lucha con el ángel». Mexico City: Joaquín Mortiz, (1989).
- Obras de Jorge Ibargüengoitia. Teatro II. Includes: «Llegó Margó», «Ante varias esfinges», «El loco amor viene», «El tesoro perdido» and «Dos crímenes». Mexico City: Joaquín Mortiz, (1989).
- Obra de Jorge Ibargüengoitia. Teatro III. Includes: «El viaje superficial», «Pájaro en mano», «Los buenos manejos», «La conspiración vendida» and «El atentado». Mexico City: Joaquín Mortiz, (1990).

=== Novels ===
- Los relámpagos de agosto. Mexico City: Joaquín Mortiz, (1965). (English translation: The Lightning of August, 1986)
- Maten al león. Mexico City: Joaquín Mortiz, (1969).
- Estas ruinas que ves. Mexico City: Novaro, (1974).
- Las muertas. Mexico City: Joaquín Mortiz, (1977). (English translation: The Dead Girls, 2018)
- Dos crímenes. Mexico City: Joaquín Mortiz, (1979). (English translation: Two Crimes, 1984)
- Los pasos de López. Mexico City: Océano, (1982).

=== Short story collections ===
- La ley de Herodes y otros cuentos. Mexico City: Joaquín Mortiz, (1967).
- Piezas y cuentos para niños. Mexico City: Joaquín Mortiz, (1990).
- El ratón del supermercado y... otros cuentos. Mexico City: Fondo de Cultura Económica, (2005).
- El niño Triclinio y la bella Dorotea. Mexico City: Fondo de Cultura Económica, (2008).

=== Essays ===
- Teatro mexicano contemporáneo. Madrid: Aguilar, (1957).
- Sálvese quien pueda. Mexico City: Novaro, (1975).

=== Article collections ===
- Viajes en la América Ignota. Mexico City: Joaquín Mortiz, (1972).
- Autopsias rápidas. Mexico City: Vuelta, (1988).
- Instrucciones para vivir en México. Mexico City: Joaquín Mortiz, (1990).
- La casa de usted y otros viajes. Mexico City: Joaquín Mortiz, (1991).

=== Films and series based on his books ===
- Maten al león (1975), directed by José Estrada
- Estas ruinas que ves (1978), directed by Julián Pastor
- Maten al león (1991), TV film directed by Jorge Alí Triana
- Dos crímenes (1993), directed by Roberto Sneider
- The dead girls (2025), a six-part television adaptation of the novel, directed by Luis Estrada.

== Awards ==
- Theatre Prize Ciudad de México for La conspiración vendida (1960)
- Theatre Prize Casa de las Américas for El atentado (1963)
- Novel Prize Casa de las Américas for Los relámpagos de agosto (1964)
- International Novel Prize México for Estas ruinas que ves (1975)

== See also ==
- Esperpento
- Joy Laville
