= Savage Rhythm =

2022 Colombian television series

- Spanish: Ritmo salvaje
- Genre: Drama
- Created by: Juliana Barrera
- Directed by: Simón Brand
- Starring: Greeicy Rendón; Paulina Dávila
- Country of origin: Colombia
- Original language: Spanish
- No. of seasons: 1
- No. of episodes: 8

Production
- Production company: Caracol Televisión

Original release
- Network: Netflix
- Release: March 2, 2022

Savage Rhythm (Spanish: Ritmo salvaje) is a Colombian television series created by Juliana Barrera and produced by Caracol Televisión for Netflix. It premiered on March 2, 2022 with a total of eight episodes. It stars Greeicy Rendón and Paulina Dávila.

== Premise ==
Two groups of young people from two opposing worlds have two things in common: one, they're passionate about dancing and acting; and two, they're going through a period in which life forces them to define their path.

== Cast ==
- Greeicy Rendón as Karina
- Paulina Dávila as Antonia
- Martina la Peligrosa as Bombita
- Ángela Cano as Ximena
- Sashua López as La Chama
- Juan Manuel Guilera as Mateo
- David Palacio as Checho
- Cristina Warner as Miranda
- Sergio Herrera as Vicente
- Kevin Bury as Alex
- Andrés Juan Hernández as Jacobo
- Alejandro Buitrago as Curro

== Episodes ==
No. overall	No. in season	Title	Directed by	Written by	Original release date
1	1	"To Hell with It"	N/A	Juliana Barrera	2 March 2022
2	2	"The Barrio"	Andres Beltran	Juliana Barrera	2 March 2022
3	3	"The Royal"	Andres Beltran	Juliana Barrera	2 March 2022
4	4	"Intruders"	Andres Beltran	Juliana Barrera, Diego Vivanco	2 March 2022
5	5	"The Chosen One"	Andres Beltran	Juliana Barrera, Valeria Gómez Reyes	2 March 2022
6	6	"Goodbye"	Rafael Martínez Moreno	Juliana Barrera, Diego Vivanco	2 March 2022
7	7	"The Betrayal"	Rafael Martínez Moreno	Juliana Barrera, Diego Vivanco	2 March 2022
8	8	"Sabotage"	N/A	Juliana Barrera, Diego Vivanco	2 March 2022
