= Cathedral of Justo =

Religious building on the outskirts of Madrid, Spain

Coordinates: 40°23′39″N 3°29′19″W

- Catedral de Justo
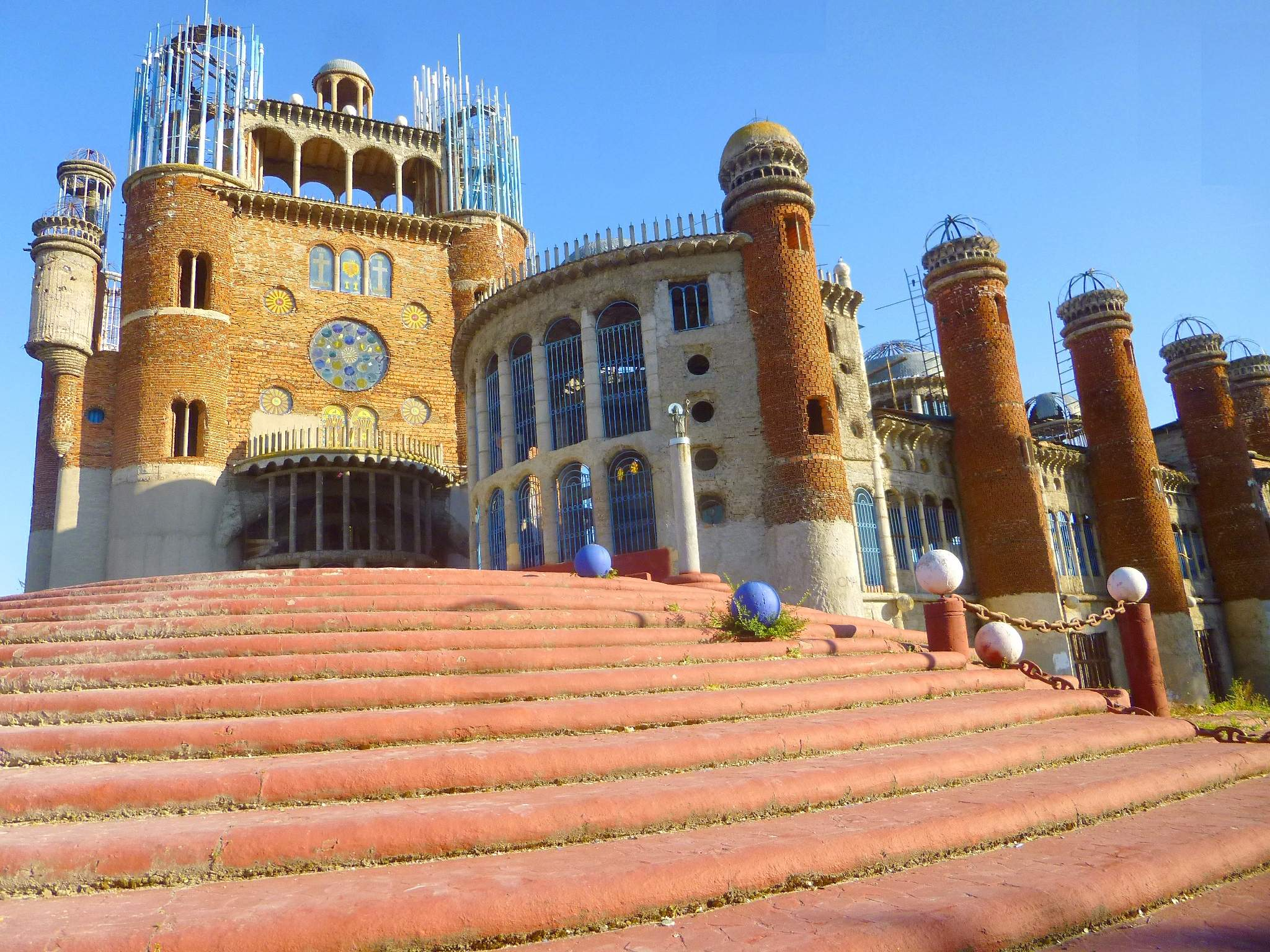
- The Cathedral of Justo in 2021

Religion
- Affiliation: Roman Catholic

Location
- Location: Comunidad de Madrid
- Municipality: Mejorada del Campo
- Country: Spain
- Interactive map of Cathedral of Justo

Architecture
- Founder: Justo Gallego Martínez

The Cathedral of Justo, sometimes also called a "cathedral of faith", is a religious building of grand proportions, much like a cathedral, located in Mejorada del Campo on the outskirts of Madrid, Spain. It is named after Justo Gallego Martínez, who initiated the building and who worked on it almost singlehandedly until his death at the age of 96. The building was donated to the Catholic organisation Mensajeros de la Paz (Messengers of Peace) to complete its construction after his death. Although the building is called a "cathedral", it has no official recognition from the Catholic Church in the Diocese of Alcalá de Henares.

== History ==
Gallego Martínez began construction on a farmland owned by his family on October 12, 1961, after he could not complete his novitiate at the Cistercian monastery Monastery of Santa María de Huerta, due to his tuberculosis.

After his condition improved, he promised to thank God, and the Virgin Mary, by constructing a church building. And, over the course of many years, using family assets, selling his land, as well as private donations, he was able to work on the building.

Gallego dedicated more than 50 years of his life to construct the building until his death. With the exception of some help from others, the near entirety of the "cathedral" has been constructed purely by Gallego, who had no qualifications in any form, his studies having been interrupted during the Spanish Civil War. Gallego constructed the building without any plan, public funding or official building permits.

The inhabitants of Mejorada del Campo know the project as the "Cathedral of Justo", and it is what the town, 20 kilometers from Madrid, is known for. The ground has been used for religious ceremonies, but it has not been consecrated. The project has received various external interest, the Museum of Modern Art in New York City presented photos of it in a temporary exhibition in 2003–2005. In 2005, it was used in a publicity campaign of the Aquarius drink brand, which brought international attention to the project. In July 2016, Great Big Story released a video focusing on Gallego and the cathedral.

Gallego died on 28 November 2021. The building was donated to the Catholic organisation Mensajeros de la Paz (Messengers of Peace) just before his death to allow the construction to be completed.

== Architecture ==
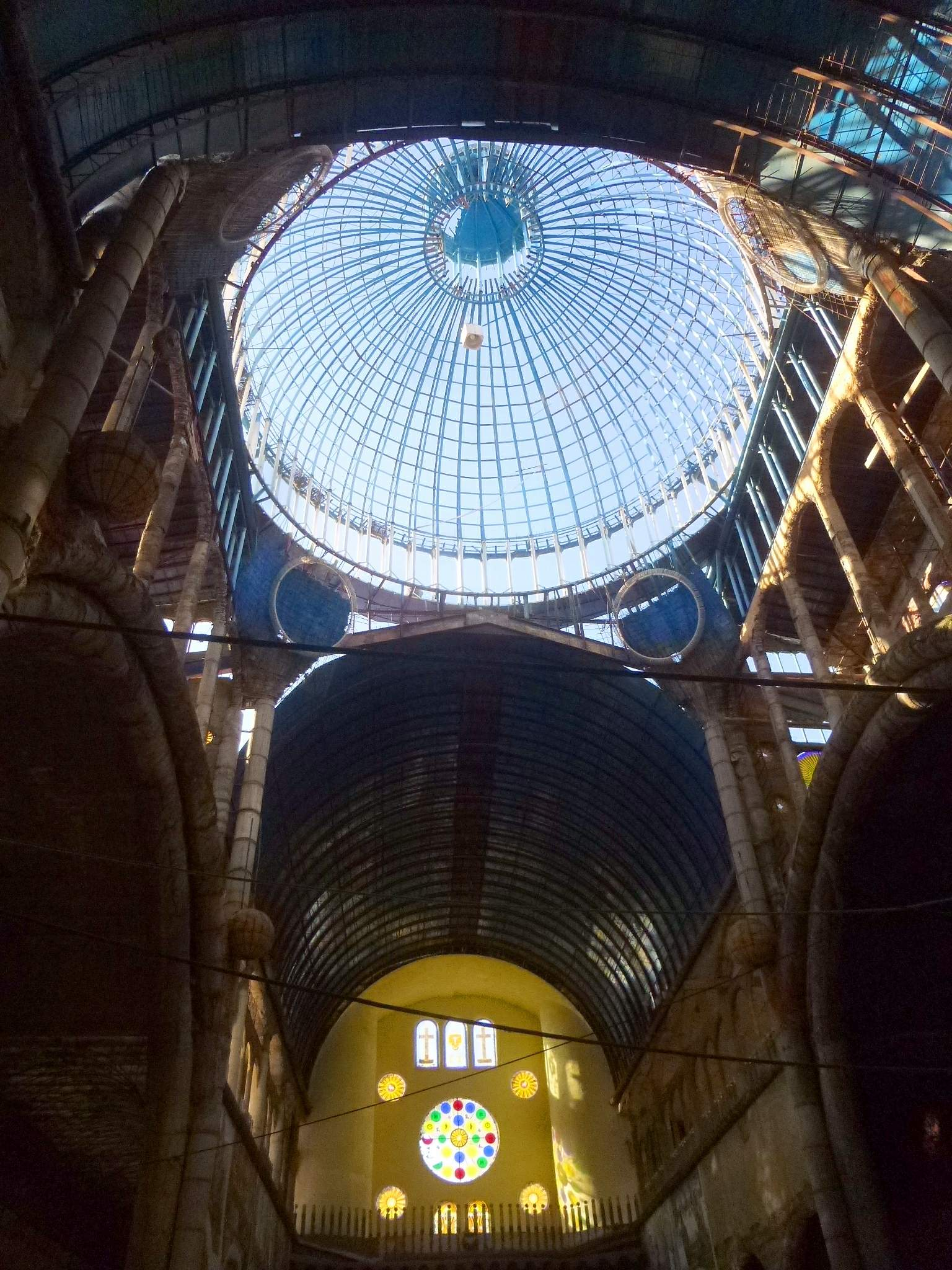
Interior of the cathedral

The cathedral covers an area of 4,700 square metres (51,000 sq ft). It features a dome 35 metres (115 ft) high 10 metres (33 ft) wide, 12 towers, a crypt, and two cloisters. Gallego constructed the cathedral out of bricks, wood, discarded material from building sites, materials recycled from old buildings, as well as various scavenged materials including old car tires and bicycle wheels, and donated materials including concrete, sculptures and decorations. He constructed the pillars using stacked oil drums, and the windows from broken coloured glass. Some of the walls are decorated with murals painted by an artist from Madrid.
