= The Dead Girls =

- Genre: Dark comedy
- Based on: Las muertas (1977) by Jorge Ibargüengoitia
- Directed by: Luis Estrada
- Starring: Paulina Gaitán; Arcelia Ramirez; Joaquín Cosío; Alfonso Herrera
- Country of origin: Mexico
- Original language: Spanish
- No. of episodes: 6

Production
- Executive producers: Luis Estrada; Sandra Solares
- Cinematography: Alberto Anaya Adalid "Mándaro"
- Editor: Mariana Rodríguez
- Running time: 61–79 minutes
- Production company: Mezcala Films

Original release
- Network: Netflix
- Release: September 10, 2025

The Dead Girls (Spanish: Las muertas) is a Mexican limited television series based on the 1977 novel by Jorge Ibargüengoitia, which was inspired by Las Poquianchis. The six-episode limited series, directed by Luis Estrada, debuted September 10, 2025, on Netflix. The work is a Spanish language production that was both set and shot in Mexico.

== Premise ==
The Dead Girls is a series set in 1960s Mexico, which at first seems like a love story, but soon devolves into a historically-based, but fictional crime drama involving sex crimes and other felonies. The series features sisters Arcángela (Arcelia Ramírez), and Serafina Baladro (Paulina Gaitán), who mastermind a brothel empire using unconscionable techniques. The supporting cast includes Alfonso Herrera, Joaquín Cosío, and Mauricio Isaac.

== Summary per episode ==
Episode one

A police officer is called when a dead girl is found in a ravine in Mexico in 1964. Back in 1960, brothel keeper Serafina Baladro and three men travel around town until they find a baker called Simón Corona. They shoot at him and light his bakery on fire. Simón survives and is brought to a hospital, where he is questioned by the police. He tells them that Serafina is his ex-girlfriend, who was driven by revenge after he broke up with her three years earlier. Simón admits that together they dumped the body of a girl, and he is given six years of jail time. Behind bars, he tells the police officer he met up with Serafina again a while back. After spending the night at a hotel, he brings her home to her sister Arcángela by car. Serafina tells Simon her sister needs help getting rid of the body of a girl who was murdered by a client of the brothel they own, and Simon reluctantly agrees to drive to the countryside, where they throw the body into a ravine.

At the same time, Serafina (who is at present also behind bars) tells the police that she first met Simón in 1952, when he was illiterate and had no money. Their relationship was troubled from the start, with the pair of them arguing often about her profession and his unemployment. Simón frequently felt homesick, but on the day he planned to leave and go back to his home town, the police showed up at the house of Juana (the eldest sister) looking for him, and they arrest him just before he can escape the town by bus. Simón is thrown in prison by the captain Bedoya, who was employed by Serafina, as she wanted to teach her partner a lesson. After his release, the couple continue their romance in Veracruz. Simón swears that he will never leave Serafina. She admits to Simón she had him locked up because she didn't want him to leave. He says he forgives her, but that evening he leaves her outside a bar and makes his getaway by car. From that moment onwards, Serafina swears that she will have revenge, and that if she can't have Simón, then no one else can, either.

Episode two

Captain Bedoya finds two local men whom he tortures into giving him the name of a man, after which he has his soldiers murder them. The captain goes to Arcángela and tells her her son Humberto is about to be arrested for drug trafficking; she buys him off. Serafina asks the captain to procure a gun for her, which he does. He takes her to the army barracks and teaches her how to shoot. Oldest sister Eulalia tells the police the story how Arcángela came to inherit a bar, which she turned into a brothel (México Lindo) that later Serafina takes over. Captain Bedoya shows Serafina a property in Concepcion de Ruiz, an army town where she believes she can run a successful brothel. The sisters buy the building and hire an architect for the renovation, but the architect is abducted and murdered, then replaced by a new one.

The opening night of the new club Casino de Danzon is a great spectacle, but soon after, a local politician looking for popular support starts preaching against the proliferation of brothels, and has a new law introduced in the state Plan de Abajo, which makes prostitution illegal. Casino de Danzon is closed down and the girls who work there are sold to brothels out of state. Serafina and Arcángela return to México Lindo, which remains open and thriving for the time being.

Episode three

While behind bars, Arcángela talks about the life and death of her son Humberto, who caused her problems and worries from a young age. After stabbing a fellow student at university, Humberto leaves for Los Angeles, and returns years later asking for money to start a business. In reality, he is a drug dealer, as revealed to Arcángela by captain Bodeya. She talks to her son, but he tells her to mind her own business. Agents have their eye on Humberto because of his criminal dealings. They intend to get rid of him, but he is fatally shot by the brothers of Conchita, the girl he is seeing, before the agents can make their move. When Serafina, Arcángela, and their girls come back from the funeral, an officer awaits them to tell them they have 24 hours to vacate Casa del Molino, as it has been closed down by the authorities. They take all the girls to Casino de Danzon and hire a lawyer to fight the closure of their brothels, but months pass without any legal successes. Serafina and Arcángela decide to sell ten girls and their property Casa del Molino, and invest the money in a ranch they buy from a certain Mister Reyna. Serafina and Arcángela invite their other sister Eulalia and her husband Teofilo over to live with them and the girls. They open the ranch with a small party of people, but three days later disaster strikes when Blanca, one of the prostitutes, dies.

Episode four

Blanca was bought from her parents as a young girl and was one of the most successful prostitutes of the Bardaro sisters. She had her teeth cast with gold to make them look better, as her crooked teeth were her biggest insecurity. She was hospitalised following complications from a botched abortion. Serafina brings Blanca back from the sanatorium when her treatment there proves expensive and fruitless. Juana goes to a local miracle worker, who prescribes a painful cure involving treating Blanca's body with a hot iron. Blanca dies later that day. The sisters bury Blanca at night om the premise of Casino de Danzon. The girls are told they brought her back to the hospital as her condition worsened. When vultures start circling around the place, the sisters dig up the body and douse it in gasoline to burn it. The gold teeth are gone, and Arcángela suspects one of the girls stole them. Indeed, while doing the laundry, Evelia finds out Feliza has Blanca's gold cast teeth in a little bag she was hiding in her clothes. The girls physically fight over the teeth, and in doing so, end up falling off the balustrade of the club, instantly killing them both. They too are buried on the premises in secret. Serafina confides in captain Begoya and tells him of the death and burials of the girls. Begoya remarks the other girls should also die and be buried to relieve them of their problems.

Episode five

Having been locked up at Casino de Danzon for months on end, four of the girls band together and device an escape plan. They leave that night, but find that the ladder that was part of their escape plan has disappeared. They are convinced that another girl called Rosa found out about the plan and told their bosses, so they go back inside and attack her in her sleep. In the morning, Juana finds Rosa crying in her room with injuries all over her body. The four culprits are discovered and captain Begoya punishes them and locks them up in a room away from the others to set an example. Four other girls attack Lupe and push her head-first into the latrines. Arcángela sends these girls to the ranch, where Eulalia and Teofilo are to guard them. However, they descape while out on a toilet break, so Eulalia brings Teofilo's gun and he shoots two of them while they are running off. Both of them die, and Arcángela and Serafina pick up the two surviving girls. They lock up the remaining girls at random at Casino de Danzon, and further anger brews among them. The girls attack Juana while she's cooking, but Serafina finds them and punishes the girls by having them hit each other with the same tool they hit Juana with. Serafina is at the end of her nerves, so captain Bogeya takes her out to a hotel in town. The day after, she has flashbacks to Simón when she sees a man who resembles him. She admits to the captain that she wants revenge, and he promises to help her. They drive around town until they find the bakery Simon works at; they shoot at him and burn his shop, as shown in the first episode.

Episode six

Following the shooting and burning of Simon's bakery, an arrest warrant is made for Serafina. The police inspector tells captain Bedoya of the upcoming arrest of Serafina and the search of Casino de Danzon. The sisters move themselves and all the girls over to the ranch, but Rosa falls ill and dies; she is buried at the ranch. The police inspector finds the sisters at the ranch, but Arcángela bribes him into denying he found them. The police come back later and find the buried corpse of Rosa, then stumble upon the group of girls locked in the shed. Serafina and Arcángela are arrested at the station, and captain Bedoya is also arrested; in total, 19 people end up behind bars awaiting the process. All the girls testify against the sisters, accusing them of abuse, starvation, and murder. A media frenzy unfolds around Concepción de Ruiz as the process takes place. Captain Bedoya is sentenced to 25 years of prison; Juana 20 years; Teofilo 20 years; Eulalia 15 years; and Serafina and Arcangéla both 35 years. It is remains unclear what happened to any of the girls.

== Cast ==
=== Main cast ===
- Paulina Gaitán as Serafina Baladro
- Arcelia Ramírez as Arcángela Baladro
- Alfonso Herrera as Simón Corona
- Joaquín Cosio as Capt. Bedoya
- Mauricio Isaac as La Calavera

=== Supporting cast ===
- Tenoch Huerta as Delfino
- Edwarda Gurrola as Lupe
- Juan Carlos Remolina as Don Mariano
- Patricia Loranca as Evelia
- Krystian Ferrer as Brave Nicholas
- Elias Toscano as Beto Paredes
- Yessica Borroto Perryman as Blanca
- Sofia Espinosa as Maria del Carmen
- Enrique Arreola as Escalera
- Fernanda Rivera as Luis María
- Cecilia de los Santos Vargas as Rosa
- Natalia Quiroz as Gloria
- Renée Sabina as Elvira
- Raúl Méndes as architect Hernández
- Ximena Romo as Conchita Zamora
- Carlos Corona as Sirenio Pantoja
- Salvador Sánchez as Judge Peralta
- Dagoberto Gama as Inspector Cueto
- Fernando Bonilla as Ticho
- Sonia Couoh as Aurora
- Rodrigo Murray as Mr. Sanabria
- Leticia Huijara as Eulalia Baladro
- Jorge Zárate as Captain Zárate
- Carlos Aragón as Teófilo Pinto
- Karen Martí as Socorro
- Mariané Cartas as Herminia
- Dunia Alexandra as Marta
- Kat Rigoni as Felizia
- Emilia Berjón as Ernestina, Helda or Elena

== Production ==
Based on Las muertas (1977) by Jorge Ibargüengoitia, the show is a fictionalized treatment of corruption in the world of human trafficking. Ibargüengoitia's novel was itself based upon the real Mexican crime network of the 1940s through 1960s, led by four sisters known as Las Poquianchis. The show's director, Luis Estrada, had previously been approached by an American company to produce an English language film based on the novel and his response was "...you don't understand anything. I don't know why you're buying the rights to the most Mexican soap opera in history, just to want to make a spoof." Following his success with ¡Que viva México! (2023), Netflix offered him the chance to direct a more faithful version of the novel. By developing the story as a series on Netflix rather than as a theatrical movie, Estrada felt he was able to more comprehensively cover the story, as the format allowed for over seven hours of content.

Filming took place at Estudios Churubusco, as well as locations in Guanajuato, Veracruz, and San Luis Potosí. Production began February 13, 2024. Estrada's father José had previously adapted a work by Ibargüengoitia entitled Maten al león into a film. The work marked Luis Estrada's episodic format directorial debut; he served various other roles. Estrada was director and showrunner; Estrada, Jaime Sampietro and Rodrigo Santos adapted the teleplays from Ibargüengoitia's novel; and Estrada and Sandra Solares were executive producers. Fernando Velázquez arranged the original music.
