= Ella camina sola =

- Genre: Thriller
- Created by: Adriana Pelusi
- Starring: Paulina Dávila; Alicia Jaziz; Christopher von Uckermann; Odiseo Bichir; Ricardo Abarca
- Composers: Andrés Sánchez Maher; Gus Reyes
- Country of origin: Mexico
- Original language: Spanish
- No. of seasons: 1
- No. of episodes: 10

Production
- Executive producers: Gabriela Remirez; Vincenzo Gratteri; Camila Jiménez Villa; Silvana Aguirre; Adriana Pelusi; Inés Barrionuevo
- Producer: Claudia Valdez
- Editor: Fernanda Gascón
- Production company: The Immigrant

Original release
- Network: Vix
- Release: 29 September 2023

Ella camina sola is a Mexican thriller streaming television series created by Adriana Pelusi. The series stars Paulina Dávila, Alicia Jaziz, Christopher von Uckermann, Odiseo Bichir and Ricardo Abarca. It premiered on Vix on 29 September 2023.

== Cast ==
=== Main ===
- Paulina Dávila as Carla
  - Carla Adell as young Carla
- Alicia Jaziz as Daniela
- Christopher von Uckermann as Ricardo
- Odiseo Bichir as José Luis
- Ricardo Abarca as Victor

=== Recurring and guest stars ===
- Sebastián Poza as Sebastián
- Iñaki Casas as Bernardo
- Cecilia Ponce as Elisa
- Macarena Oz as Anya
- Florencia Rios as Aurora
- Camila Calónico as Lorena
- Maite Piña as Ana Pau
- Stephania Lodena as Rebeca
- Paloma Petra as Renata
- Tania Niebla as Irene
- César Acosta as Esteban
- Zury Shasho as Javier
- Giovanna Utrilla as María José
- Fernando Bonilla as Gustavo
- Ari Shasho as Manuel
- Cecilia Cañedo as Natalia
- Val Dorantes as Arantza

== Production ==
On 30 August 2022, it was announced that production had begun on the series under the working title Una noche. On 18 September 2023, it was announced that the series would premiere on 29 September 2023, with the official title being Ella camina sola.

== Episodes ==
No.	Title	Directed by	Written by	Original release date
1	"Una denuncia anónima"	Inés Barrionuevo	Adriana Pelusi	29 September 2023
2	"La alumna problema"	Inés Barrionuevo	Adriana Pelusi	29 September 2023
3	"Lo justo"	Inés Barrionuevo	Adriana Pelusi & Gabriela Guraieb	29 September 2023
4	"Consecuencias"	Inés Barrionuevo	Adriana Pelusi & Joanna Delgado Chiaberto	29 September 2023
5	"Todos vamos a estar bien"	Analeine Cal y Mayor	Adriana Pelusi & Joanna Delgado Chiaberto	29 September 2023
6	"Algo épico"	Analeine Cal y Mayor	Adriana Pelusi & Gabriela Guraieb	29 September 2023
7	"Miedo a todo"	Analeine Cal y Mayor	Adriana Pelusi & Joanna Delgado Chiaberto	29 September 2023
8	"El vacío"	Analeine Cal y Mayor	Adriana Pelusi & Gabriela Guraieb	29 September 2023
9	"Un cuento"	Cris Gris	Adriana Pelusi, Joanna Delgado Chiaberto & Gabriela Guraieb	29 September 2023
10	"Hay días mejores"	Cris Gris	Adriana Pelusi	29 September 2023

== Awards and nominations ==
Year	Award	Category	Nominated	Result	Ref
2024	Produ Awards	Best Lead Actress - Drama Series	Paulina Dávila	Nominated	
2024	Produ Awards	Best Screenplay - Drama Series	Adriana Pelusi	Nominated	
