= Fernando Bonilla (actor) =

Mexican actor (born 1985)

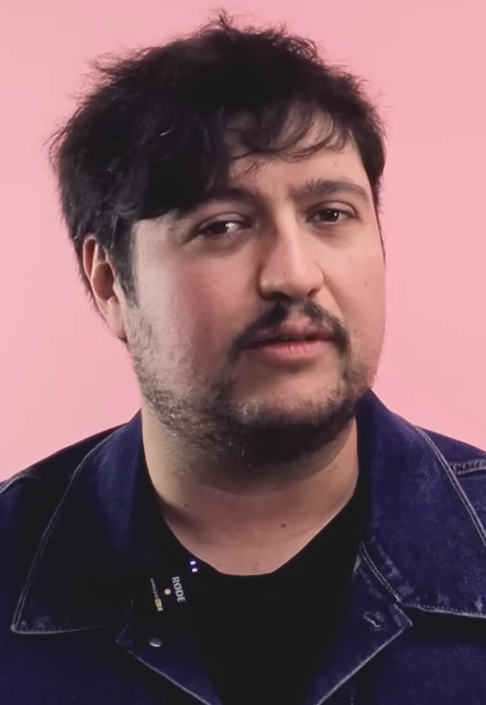
- Bonilla in 2026
- Born: Héctor Fernando Bonilla Calzadilla; 11 October 1985 (age 41); Mexico City, Mexico
- Occupations: Actor; Comedian
- Years active: 1996-present
- Children: Demetrio Bonilla
- Parents: Héctor Bonilla (father); Sofía Álvarez (mother)
- Relatives: Sofía Álvarez (great-grandmother); Leonor Bonilla (half-sister); Sergio Bonilla (half-brother)

Héctor Fernando Bonilla Calzadilla (born 11 October 1985) is a Mexican actor and comedian.

== Life and career ==
Héctor Fernando Bonilla Calzadilla was born on 11 October 1985 in Mexico City, the son of actors Héctor Bonilla and Sofía Álvarez, the grandson of Venezuelan-Mexican director, translator, and voiceover actor Fernando Calzadilla Álvarez, great grandson of Colombian-Mexican actress Sofía Álvarez, y half brother of Leonor and Sergio Bonilla.

Having grown up in a family environment dedicated to entertainment media, he joined the industry, debuting as a child voice actor in 1996, dubbing to spanish the character of Harold Berman in the American animated series Hey Arnold! until 2004. In 2004, he debuted in a supporting film role in Mónica y el profesor. Exploring other professional areas, from 2013 to 2021, he ventured into theater, directing and acting in Almacenados, in which he participated alongside his father Hector and his half-brother Sergio.

After only appearing in supporting roles in several television series, among them Historia de un crimen: La búsqueda (2020), Narcos: México (2021), Un extraño enemigo (2022), and Las muertas (2025), in 2025, he landed the starring role of Jerónimo Ponce III in the comedy series La oficina, a Mexican version of the original British series The Office, heavily influenced by the American series, which premiered 13 March 2026.

== Personal life ==
He has a son, actor Demetrio Bonilla, whose mother is theater director and playwright Valentina Sierra.

== Filmography ==
=== Acting ===
==== Film ====
Year	Title	Role	Notes
2003	Mónica y el profesor	Guardaespaldas	
2009	Los últimos	Vázquez	Short film
2020	Estanislao	Estanislao	
2022	Northern Skies Over Empty Space	Raúl	Nominated – Ariel Award for Best Supporting Actor
2023	Lost in the Night	Rigoberto Duplas	
2024	Mejor viuda que mal acompañada	Rafael Madrigal	
2024	Technoboys	Freddy	

==== Television ====
Year	Title	Role	Notes
2019	Duelo de comediantes	El Diente de Oro	Segunda temporada
2020	Historia de un crimen: La búsqueda	Policía malo	
2021	Narcos: Mexico	Vicente Carrillo Fuentes	
2022	Un extraño enemigo	Mario Moya Palencia	
2022	Marea alta	Mauricio	
2022-2023	Harina	Yayo Scheffer	
2023	Ella camina sola	Gustavo	
2024	Me caigo de risa	El Diente de Oro	Comedic program, guest in season 10
2024-2025	LOL: Last One Laughing (México)	El Diente de Oro	Reality TV show, winner of season 7
2025	Mujeres asesinas	Pachi	Season 3, episode 6: "Nayeli"
2025	Las muertas	Ticho	
2026	La oficina	Jerónimo Ponce III	
2026	La Banda	Andy	

=== Dubbing ===
==== Film ====
Year	Title	Role	Original actor	Notes
2002	Hey Arnold!: The Movie	Harold Berman	Justin Shenkarow	Animated film

==== Television ====
Year	Title	Role	Original actor	Notes
1996-2004	Hey Arnold!	Harold Berman	Justin Shenkarow	Animated series
1999	The Simpsons	Nelson Muntz	Nancy Cartwright	Season 10, episode "Sunday, Cruddy Sunday"
2019	Opa Popa Dupa	Condorcía	Himself	Series for children
