= Chapel of San Fausto =

Cultural property in Mejorada del Campo, Spain

- Capilla de San Fausto (Spanish)
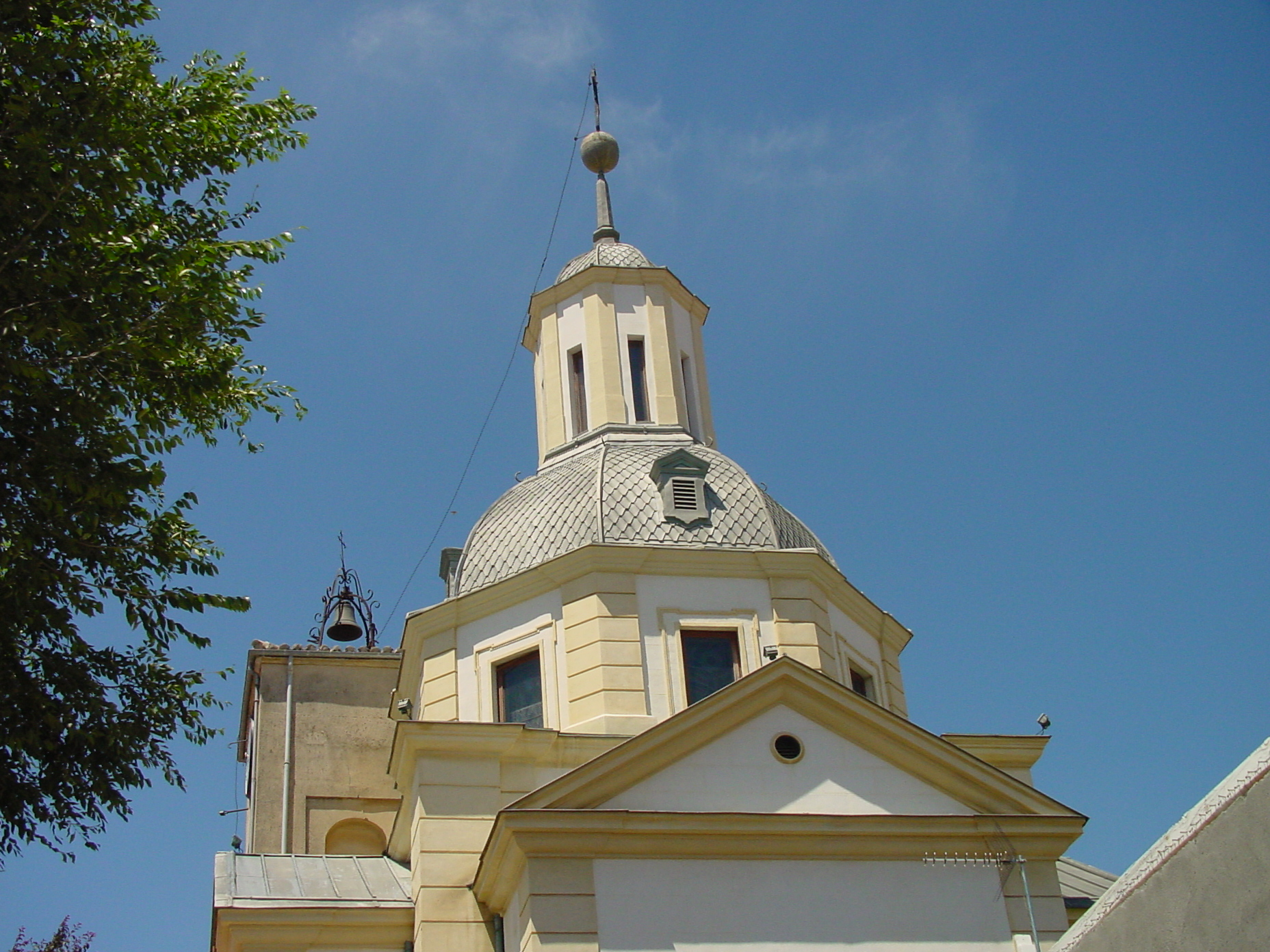

- Location within Spain
- 40.396789°N 3.488476°W
- Location: Mejorada del Campo, Spain

History
- Built: 1687–1691

Site notes
- Architect: Matías Román
- Architectural style: church

Spanish Cultural Heritage
- Official name: Capilla de San Fausto
- Type: Non-movable
- Criteria: Monument
- Designated: 1986
- Reference no.: RI-51-0005279

The Chapel of San Fausto (Spanish: Capilla de San Fausto) is a chapel located in Mejorada del Campo, Spain. It was declared Bien de Interés Cultural in 1986.

Designed by Matías Román, it was constructed between 1687 and 1691.
