= ¡Alarma! (magazine) =

Mexican news magazine

¡Alarma! was a Mexican news magazine published by Publicaciones Llegó. It specialized in graphics and shocking pictures of crime and corpses, including murder victims and traffic accidents, as well as pictures of scantily clad women.

== History and profile ==
Pitched by journalist and writer Carlos Samoaya Lizárraga as a magazine exclusively about crime, ¡Alarma! was launched on April 17, 1963, with an initial print run of 3000 copies per week. The magazine became notorious for publishing graphic images of corpses and using shocking headlines such as "Raptola, violola y matola con una pistola" ("He kidnapped her, raped her, and killed her with a gun").

¡Alarma! got an unexpected boost in 1964, when it publicised the case of the González Valenzuela sisters, who forced women into prostitution, killed them, and repeatedly bribed authorities to avoid arrest. The case and the ensuing court process, covered by journalist Jesús Sánches Hermosillo, became a nationwide media circus. After publishing the incident's graphic details, ¡Alarma! increased its print run from 140,000 to 500,000 copies per week.

The magazine enjoyed another sales boost during coverage of the 1985 Mexico City earthquake's aftermath, which increased the magazine's print run to 2-2,5 million copies per week. It was also printed in countries such as the United States, France, the Netherlands, Belgium, and Japan. The magazine was cancelled in 1986 due to a political standoff between Publicaciones Llegó and the Mexican government but returned in 1991 as El nuevo Alarma!.

¡Alarma!'s final issue was published on February 17, 2014, one month before the death of its editor-in-chief Miguel Ángel Rodríguez Vázquez due to a heart attack.

== In popular culture ==
The song Alármala de tos on Botellita de Jerez's eponymous debut album was inspired by the typical kind of violent and macabre stories published by ¡Alarma!.
