= Avianca Flight 011 =

1983 aviation accident in Spain

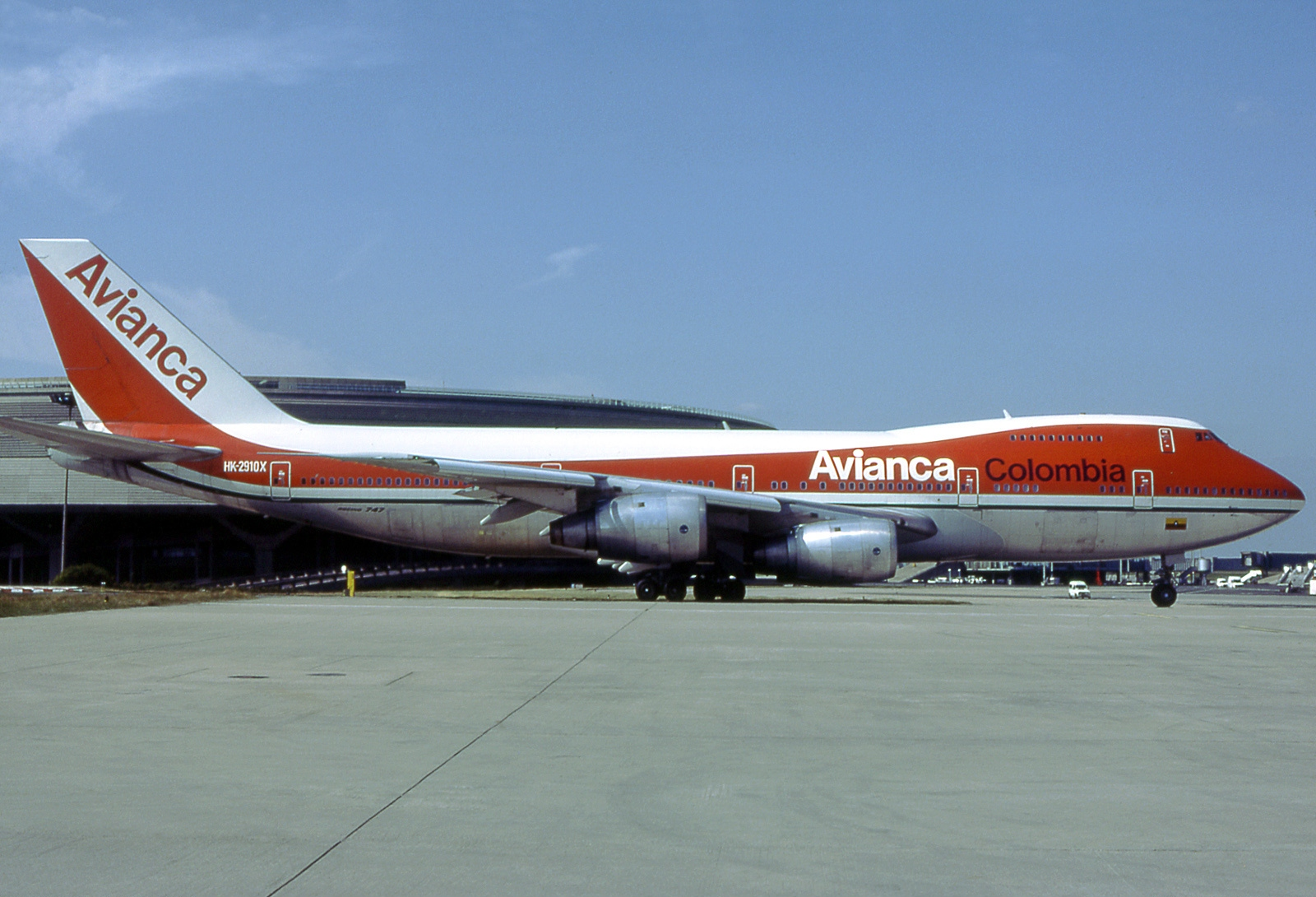
- HK-2910X, the aircraft involved in the accident, photographed in August 1983

Accident
- Date: 27 November 1983
- Summary: Controlled flight into terrain due to pilot error, navigational error, and ATC error
- Site: Mejorada del Campo, near Madrid Barajas International Airport, Madrid, Spain; 40°24′12″N 3°26′57″W

Aircraft
- Aircraft type: Boeing 747-283BM Combi
- Aircraft name: Olafo
- Operator: Avianca
- IATA flight No.: AV011
- ICAO flight No.: AVA011
- Call sign: AVIANCA 011
- Registration: HK-2910X
- Flight origin: Frankfurt Airport, West Germany (Note: The first segment was cancelled for this flight.)
- 1st stopover: Charles de Gaulle Airport, Paris, France
- 2nd stopover: Madrid Barajas International Airport, Madrid, Spain
- Last stopover: Simón Bolívar International Airport, Caracas, Venezuela
- Destination: El Dorado International Airport, Bogotá, Colombia
- Occupants: 192
- Passengers: 169
- Crew: 23
- Fatalities: 181
- Injuries: 11
- Survivors: 11

Avianca Flight 011 was a Boeing 747-200BM Combi on an international scheduled passenger flight from Frankfurt to Bogotá via Paris, Madrid, and Caracas that crashed near Madrid on 27 November 1983. It took off from Charles de Gaulle Airport in Paris at 22:25 on 26 November 1983 for Madrid Barajas Airport; take-off was delayed waiting for additional passengers from a Lufthansa flight due to a cancellation of the Paris-Frankfurt-Paris segment by Avianca for operational reasons.

During the instrument landing system (ILS) approach to runway 33, the 747 crashed on a hill approximately 12 kilometres (7.5 mi) southeast of the airport, killing 181 people, including 19 on-duty and four off-duty crew members. The 11 surviving passengers were seriously injured. The cause of the accident was judged to be pilot error, the captain having incorrectly determined the position of the plane. As of 2026, Avianca Flight 011 remains the second-deadliest aviation accident in Spanish territory (the deadliest being the Tenerife airport disaster), the deadliest accident in mainland Spain, the deadliest crash involving a single aircraft in Spain and the deadliest accident in the history of Avianca.

== Background ==
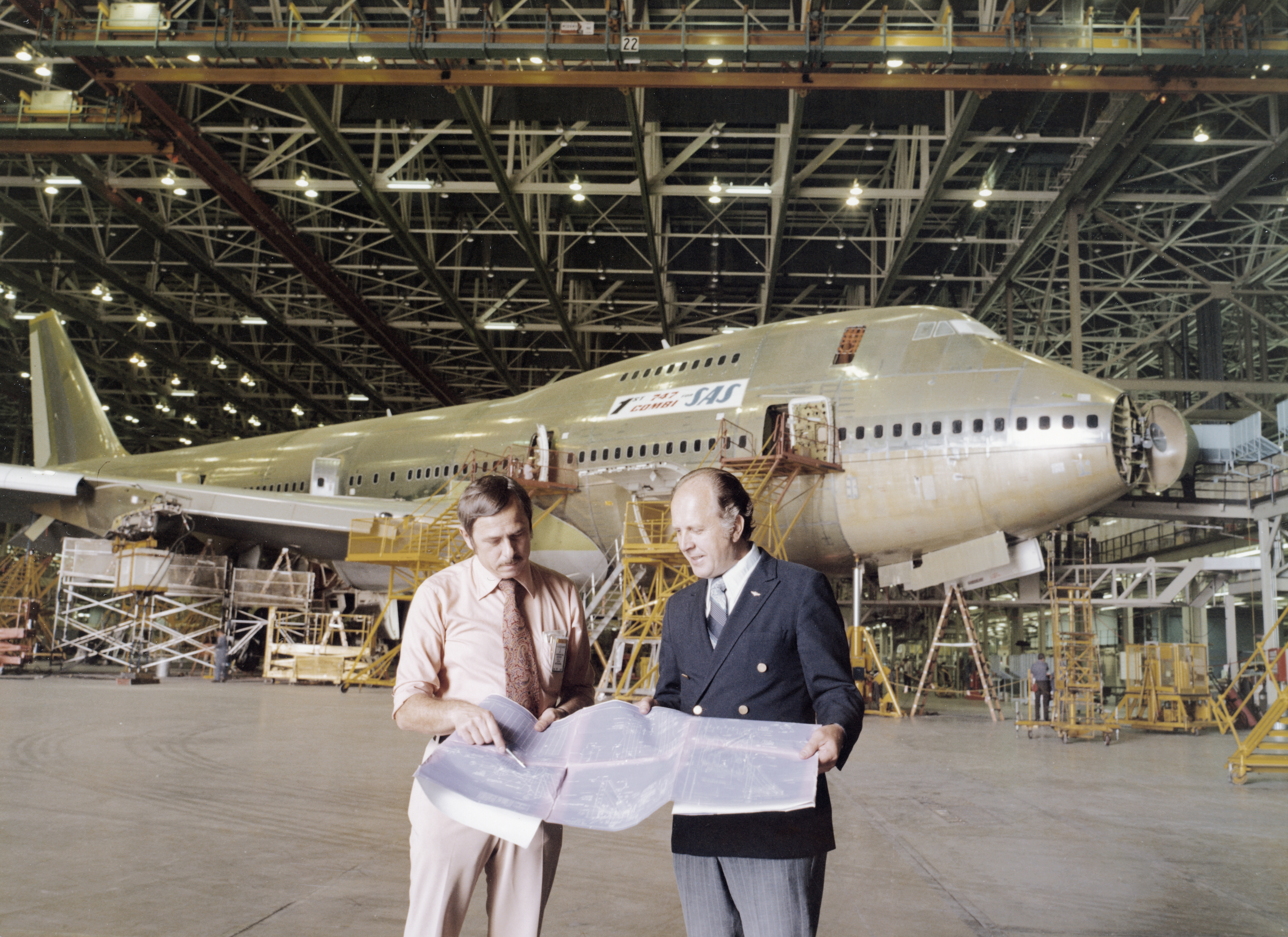
The aircraft involved during its assembly in 1977

The aircraft involved was a Boeing 747-200BM Combi (Note: The M meaning a mixed passenger-cargo (Combi) aircraft) that first flew in 1977 and was delivered to Scandinavian Airlines System the same year. The aircraft was registered as LN-RNA and was named Magnus Viking. It was leased to Avianca in 1982 and re-registered as HK-2910X. The aircraft was nicknamed Olafo by the airline's employees. The aircraft was powered by four Pratt & Whitney JT9D-70A turbofan engines and was 6.3 years old at the time of the accident.

The captain was 58-year-old Tulio Hernández, who was one of Avianca's most experienced pilots, having been with the airline for 32 years. He had logged a total of 23,215 flight hours, including 2,432 hours on the Boeing 747.

The first officer was 36-year-old Eduardo Ramírez, who had been with the airline for 10 years and had 4,384 flight hours, with 875 of them on the Boeing 747.

The flight engineer was 57-year-old Juan Laverde, another one of Avianca's veteran pilots, who had been with the airline for 25 years and had 15,942 flight hours. He was the most experienced on the Boeing 747, having logged 3,676 hours on it. There were also two relief flight engineers on board: Daniel Zota and Julio Florez Camacho.

== Accident ==
It was night at the time of the accident. The meteorological conditions just before the crash consisted of a visibility of 8 kilometres (5 mi), and the wind was calm. About 20 minutes prior to the impact, the aircraft had obtained meteorological information on the weather conditions at Barajas from Avianca. The first contact with Spanish air traffic controllers had taken place at 23:31. At 00:03, the aircraft contacted Barajas again and was cleared to land on runway 33; this was the air traffic controller's last contact with the aircraft. The accident took place in the township of Mejorada del Campo, approximately 12 kilometres (7.5 mi) southeast of the Madrid Airport. The time of the accident was approximately 00:06 on 27 November. The plane hit three different hills on its way down during the crash, with a final impact on the third hill. The debris of the airplane was widely scattered as a consequence of the impacts. The crash killed 158 passengers, 19 crew members, and four off-duty crew members. Eleven passengers (six women and five men) survived but were seriously injured. Of the injured, nine were ejected from the airplane, a few of them still in their seats, and two claimed to have exited the aircraft by themselves. The aircraft was destroyed by the impact and ensuing fire. The airplane was equipped with a digital flight data recorder and a cockpit voice recorder, both of which were recovered on the day of the accident in good condition.

== Investigation ==
The crash was investigated by the Spanish Civil Aviation Accident and Incident Investigation Commission (CIAIAC).

PROBABLE CAUSE: "The pilot-in-command, without having any precise knowledge of his position, set out to intercept the instrument landing system (ILS) on an incorrect track without initiating the published instrument approach maneuver; in so doing, he descended below the sector minima until he collided with the ground. Contributory factors were:

- a) Inaccurate navigation by the crew, which placed them in an incorrect position for initiating the approach maneuver;
- b) Failure of the crew to take corrective action in accordance with the operating instructions of the ground proximity warning system;
- c) Deficient teamwork on the flight deck;
- d) Imprecise position information supplied to the aircraft by APP;
- e) The APP controller, in failing to inform the aircraft that radar service had terminated, did not maintain a proper watch on the radar scope."

— (CIAIAC)

There was no evidence of any anomalies in Paris prior to this flight. The crew had stayed in the city 72 hours after arriving on flight AV010 on the first day, 24 November 1983. The investigation also determined that the pilot-in-command and crew were properly licensed and qualified, as were the air traffic controllers. The aircraft carried a valid certificate of airworthiness, as well as a registration and maintenance certificate. The airplane was maintained in accordance with the prescribed maintenance program, and the navigation and approach aids were checked and found to be functioning correctly. In addition, there was no record of malfunctions in the controllers' communications or radar equipment, and no evidence was discovered of defects in the aircraft engines or systems.

== Notable people killed ==
Victims include several notable people invited to the Colombian Government's First meeting on Hispanoamerican culture (Spanish: Primer Encuentro de la Cultura Hispanoamericana). Other notable victims were named in the New York Times.

- Jorge Ibargüengoitia – Mexican novelist
- Ángel Rama – Uruguayan writer, academic, and literary critic
- Rosa Sabater – Spanish pianist
- Manuel Scorza – Peruvian novelist, poet, and political activist
- Marta Traba – Argentine writer and art critic (Ángel Rama was her husband)
- Ana Sixta Gonzalez de Cuadros – Colombian senator
- John Buckle – General Secretary of the Revolutionary Communist Party of Britain (Marxist-Leninist)

== See also ==
- Korean Air Flight 801
- American Airlines Flight 965
- Air Inter Flight 148
- Prinair Flight 277
- Madrid runway disaster – another Spanish Aviation incident that occurred only 10 days later
