= Justo Gallego Martínez =

Spanish church builder (1925–2021)

Coordinates: 40°23′39″N 3°29′18″W

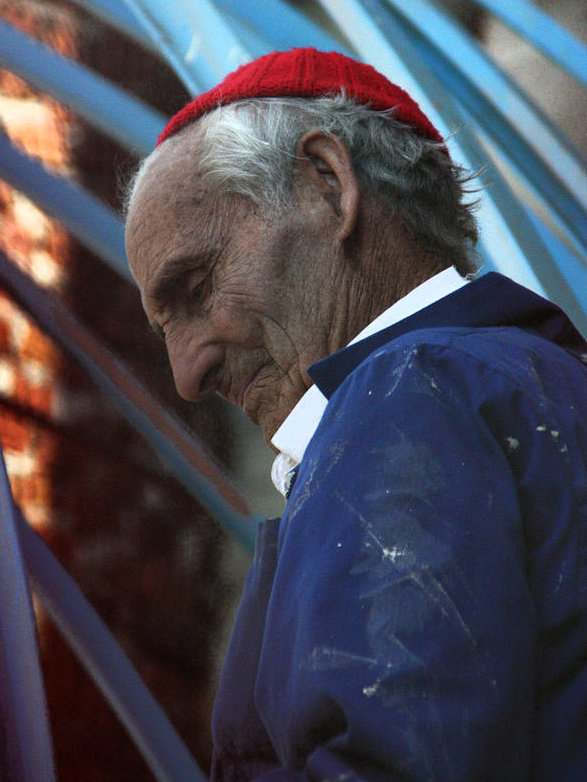
- Justo in 2010
- Born: 20 September 1925; Mejorada del Campo, Madrid, Spain
- Died: 28 November 2021 (aged 96); Mejorada del Campo, Madrid, Spain
- Other name: Don Justo
- Occupations: Church builder, former Trappist monk
- Notable work: Cathedral of Justo

Justo Gallego Martínez (20 September 1925 – 28 November 2021); also known by his honorific byname Don Justo, was a Spanish amateur architect and builder who was known for constructing a church building in the dimensions of a cathedral on his own in the town of Mejorada del Campo from 1961 until his death. Most of the construction materials used were recycled or made from "junk". Don Justo dedicated the building to Our Lady of the Pillar (Spanish: Nuestra Señora del Pilar).

== Early life and inspiration ==
Justo Gallego Martínez grew up as a farmer. His mother, who was very pious, instilled in him a strong Catholic faith. According to his own words he loved the Church and "put everything on this". Justo's school education was interrupted by the Spanish Civil War. At the age of ten he witnessed communist forces, who were fighting Francisco Franco, shooting priests and ransacking the church in Mejorada del Campo; the events left him with little respect for the town's socialist administration.

As a young man, he entered a Trappist monastery as a novice. In 1961, he had to leave prior to making his final vows, when he contracted tuberculosis and his health deteriorated because of the ascetic way of life of the Trappists. Justo believed that he was forced to leave the monastery due to his tuberculosis, although fellow monk Severino San Juan stated that it was actually because of his confrontational personality.

== Cathedral of Justo ==
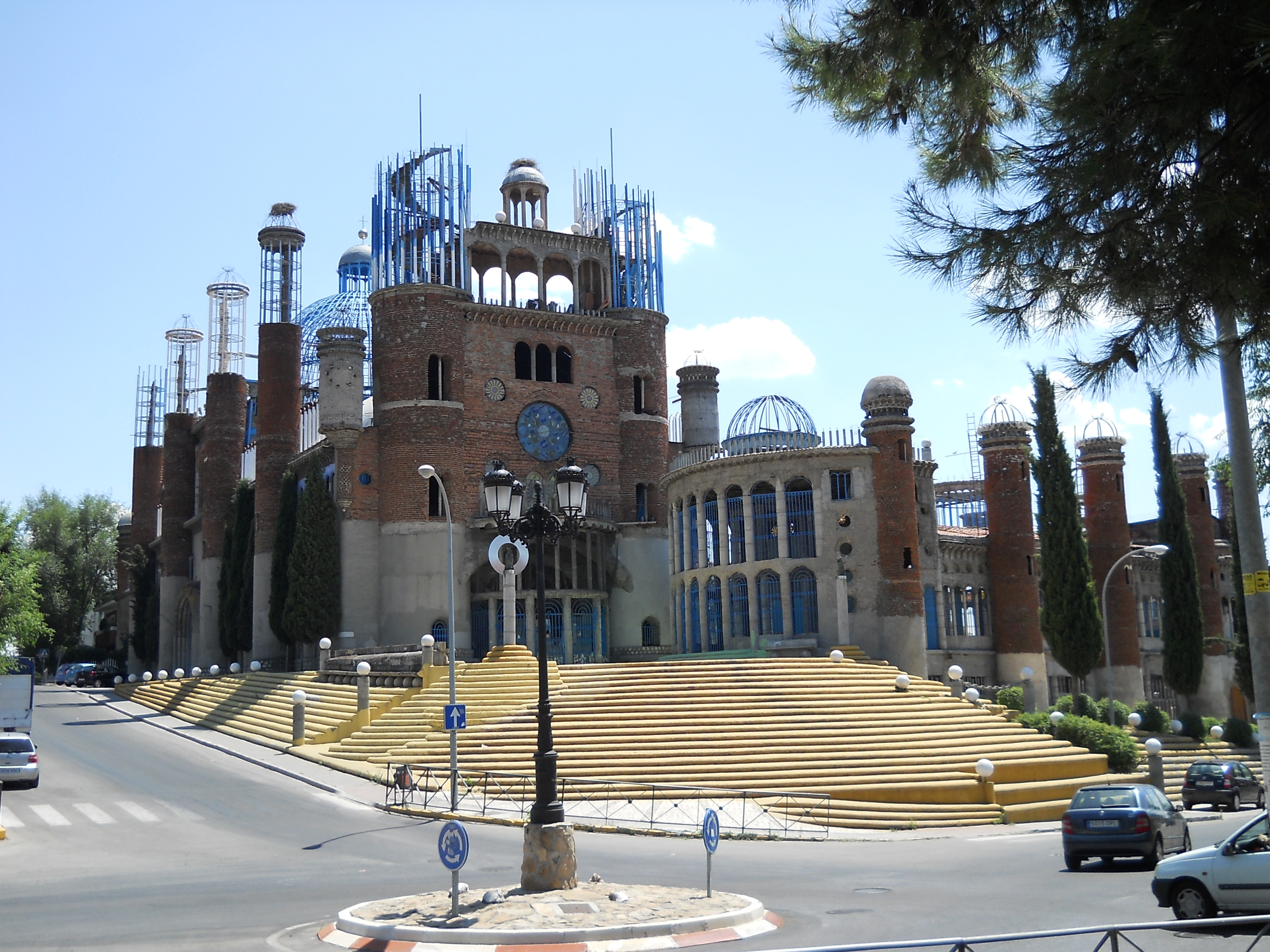
The Cathedral of Justo in 2011

Justo had promised that if he recovered from the tuberculosis which had struck him down, he would build a shrine in honour of Our Lady of the Pillar, to whom he had prayed. So, he began to build on a plot of land he had inherited from his parents. On 12 October 1961 (the feast of the Our Lady of the Pillar), Gallego commenced building the Cathedral of Justo. There never were formal plans for the building, which locally was called "the cathedral from junk". Justo initially just levelled the ground and mapped out the groundworks on-site. The building has evolved over time in response to opportunity and inspiration. Design inspirations have included St. Peter's Basilica in the Vatican City, the White House in the U.S., and various castles and churches in Spain.

The outer dimensions of the main building are 20 by 50 metres (66 by 164 ft), with a total built-up area of about 8,000 square metres (86,000 ft^{2}). Below the main building there is a crypt and adjacent there is a complex of minor chapels, cloisters, lodgings and a library. The dome of the main building (modelled on St. Peter's Basilica) is about 40 metres (130 ft) in height, about 12 metres (39 ft) in diameter.

Most of the building materials and tools used for construction are recycled. This includes everyday objects and excess construction materials donated by construction companies and a nearby brick factory. For instance, the columns have been moulded with old petrol drums. The building work has been carried out without any crane. Gallego usually began his workday at 6:00 AM and worked for ten hours a day, except on Sundays. Eusebio Sanchez Dominges, the parish priest, described Justo as a devout man who attended Mass every Sunday.

=== Support and finance ===
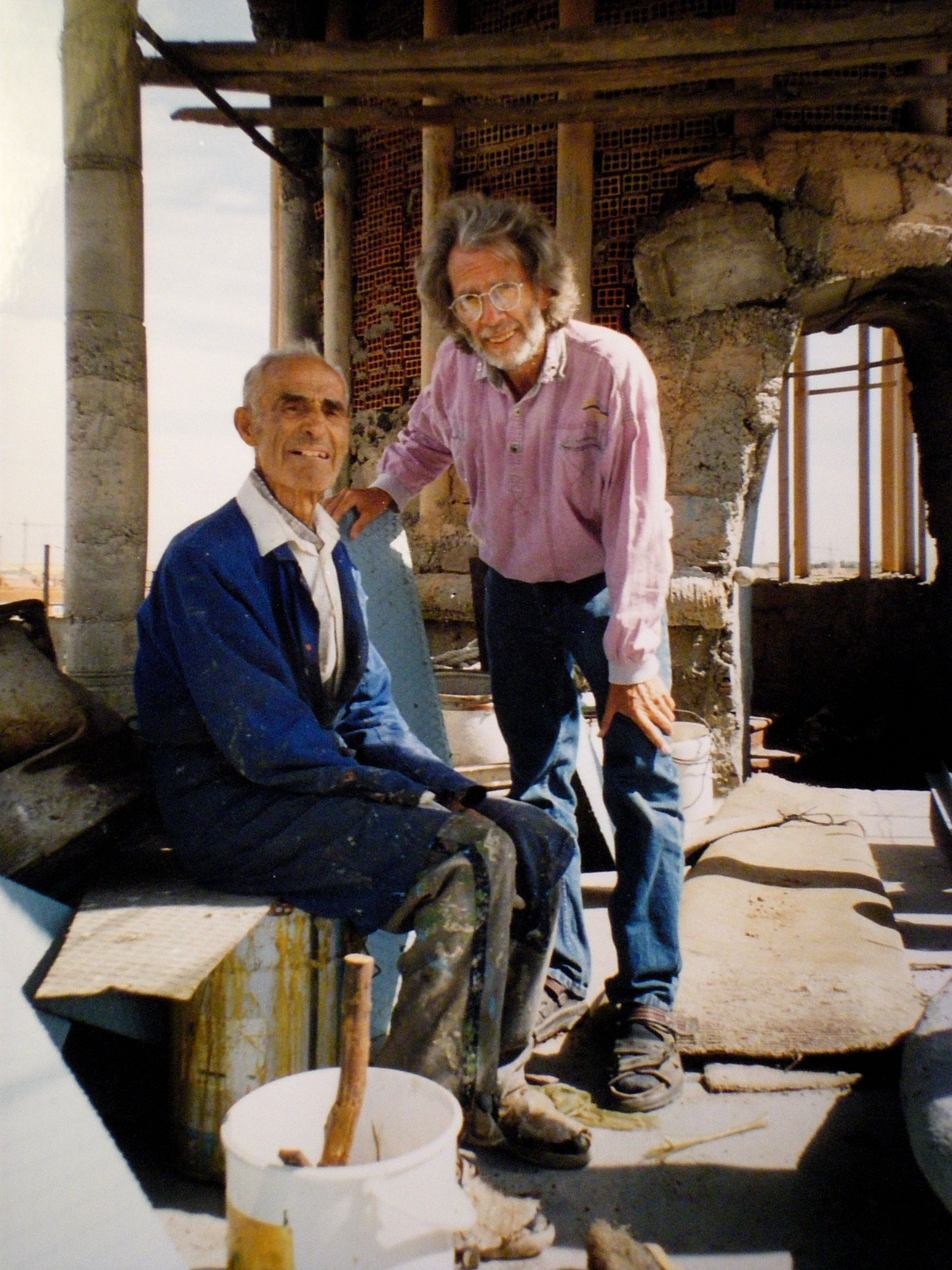
Justo Gallego Martinez with German artist Ulrich Brinkhoff in 2011

Although Justo Gallego worked mainly alone for nearly 60 years, he was assisted by a local named Ángel López Sánchez. He had also been supported by his six nephews (who, for example, helped placing the girders for the dome) and by occasional volunteers. Occasionally, he consulted an expert at his own expense. In 2005, an advertising campaign for the Aquarius soft drink gave him and his cathedral nationwide exposure in Spain. Shortly before his death, Don Justo bequeathed his enormous building to the non-governmental organization Messengers of Peace (Spanish: Mensajeros de la Paz), which committed itself to completing his life's work.

=== Construction permits ===
A certified architect offered pro bono services to aid in legalizing the building. The building does not have formal planning permission or building permits from the authorities of Mejorada del Campo or support of the Roman Catholic Church. The town authorities, however, have named the street on which the project has been rising "Calle Antonio Gaudí", after the architect behind another famous unfinished church, the Sagrada Família.

== Death ==
Gallego Martínez died in Madrid on 28 November 2021, at the age of 96. He had died within the Cathedral and had requested that he be buried in its crypt, but was buried instead in Mejorada del Campo’s cemetery after local government officials found that the crypt did not meet Spanish sanitation rules.

== Reception and legacy ==
A brief documentary on Don Gallego's work was produced in 2006 by the Latin American version of Discovery Channel, in which Gallego explained his vision. The work has also been noted in the Museum of Modern Art in New York City. In 2016, he was featured in a two-minute video published by Great Big Story. Another documentary film titled The Cathedral was directed by Denis Dobrovoda and released in 2023.

During his life, Don Justo was described by Catholics as a "fool for Christ" owing to his eccentricity and dedication to the construction of his cathedral.

== See also ==
- Outsider art
