= Ulrich Brinkhoff =

German photographer and writer

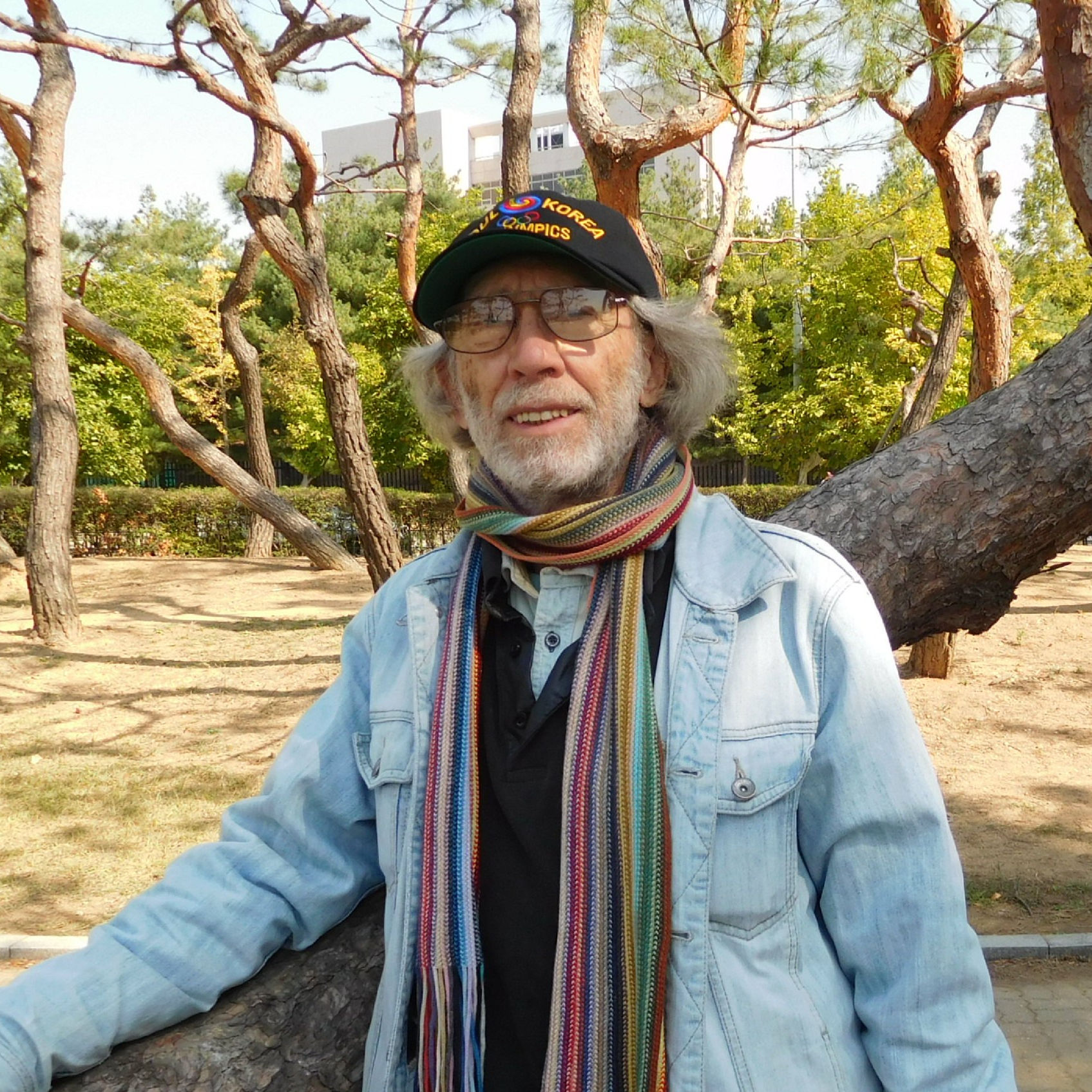
Brinkhoff in 2015 in Korea

Ulrich Brinkhoff (born 1940) is a German photographer and writer. He was born in Holzminden/Weser, Germany.

== Life and work ==
Brinkhoff was born at the beginning of World War II, his father an Air Force pilot and his mother a bookseller. He was primarily raised by his grandparents after his parents' divorce in 1947. In 1949 his stepfather joined the family, but Brinkhoff ran away shortly after and lived with an uncle in Stadtoldendorf, 15 kilometres (9.3 mi) away from Holzminden, where his school was.

In 1952 he took part in a photography competition and won a prize, the money with which he bought a more professional camera. Until then he had been using his mother's old AGFA Box camera.

In 1960 he finished his apprenticeship as an insurance salesman. From 1961 until 1972 he worked for the German Foreign Ministry as diplomat and served at German embassies in Sierra Leone, South-Korea, South-Vietnam and Bolivia. In October of 1965 he married Soo Ryun Hyung-Sook Kim in Seoul, who later died in 1975 in a car accident.

In 1968, during the Vietnam War in Saigon he saved the life of Ambassador Ulrich Scheske. German President Heinrich Luebke honoured this by conferring him with the Bundesverdienstmedaille (Federal Merit medal).

After his return to Germany in 1972, he worked as an export manager for several German companies until 1988. Since 1989 he has worked as a fine art photographer, as well as a freelancer and writer. As photographer he opts not to use digital manipulation in any of his photos. He uses small digital cameras only, saying that a good photo depends on a good eye, not on cameras.

Since 2007 his main interests have been street art and street theatre, which has led to him traveling to visit festivals all over the world, including in Spain, France, Hong Kong (which he visits every year), and South Korea, specifically the Hi-Seoul-Festival and the Goyang Lake Park Art Festival.

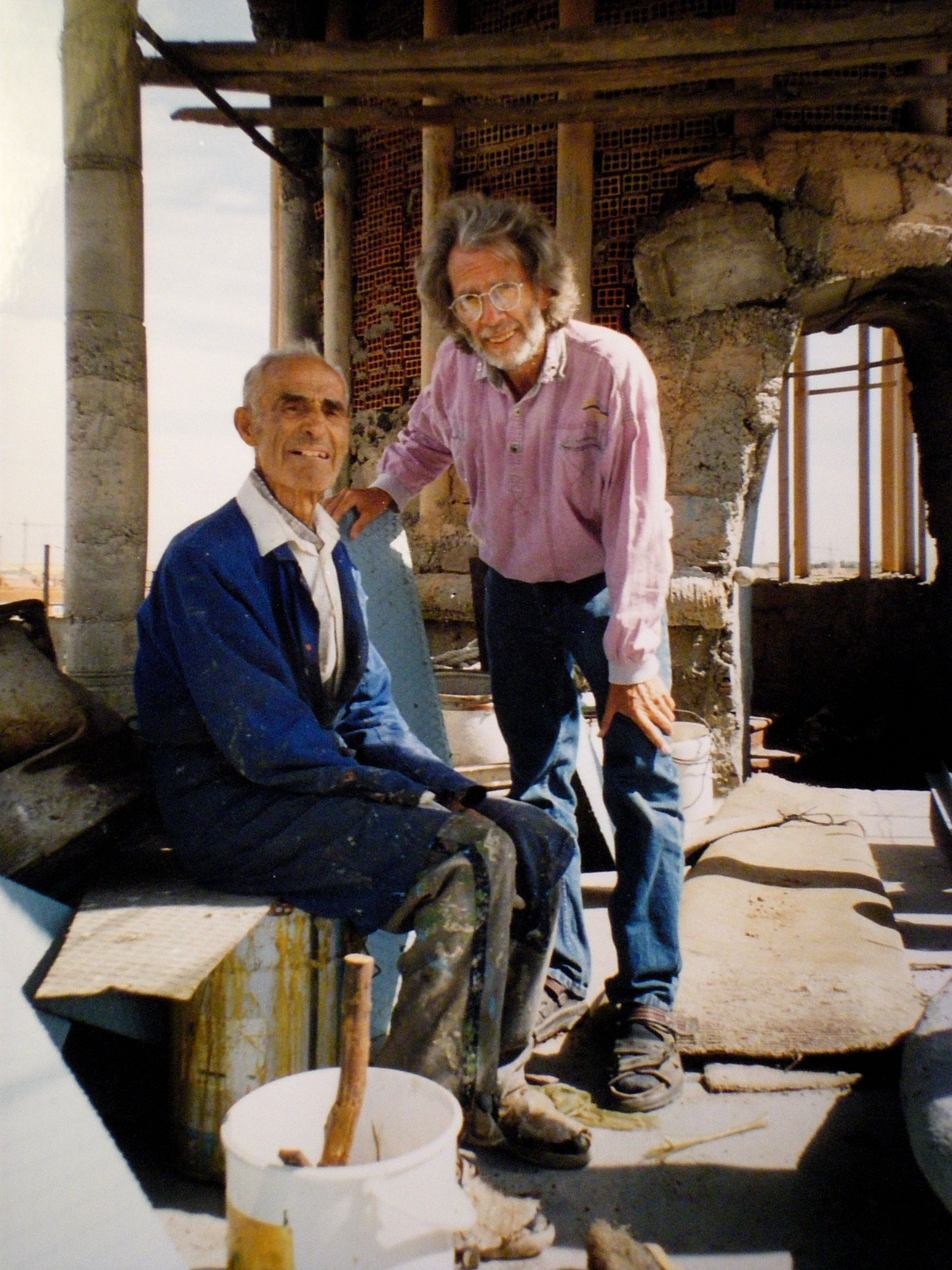
Don Justo Gallego Martínez on the roof of his cathedral together with German artist Ulrich Brinkhoff

In September 2013, his first book was published, a combination of prose and photography, about his life in South Korea from 1964 to 1965, translated as Dreams in the Morning Calm. In May 2014 he published a sequel with the translated title Nightmares along the Saigon River. The trilogy was completed January 2016 with Carnival at Lake Titicaca. The trilogy narrates his private and official life as a diplomat at German embassies. It also describes his wife's life as well, starting as a housewife, thereafter as model, and finally stewardess for Lufthansa before her death at 28.

From 1989 until 1992, Brinkhoff was a member of the town council of Greven (North-Rhine-Westfalia), where he has been living and working since 1987. Brinkhoff is married and has two adult children.

== Honours and awards ==
- 1999: Gold medal with "Hasselblad Austrian Super Circuit" for "Verbindung"
- 2005: Gold medal with "1st World of Images Circuit"
- 2005: Gold medal with "Trierenberg Super Circuit" (ex Hasselblad A.S.C.{Austrian Super Circuit}) for "Hinter Glas"
- 1968: "Bundesverdienstmedaille" (Federal Merit medal).[1]
