= Paulina Dávila =

Colombian actress

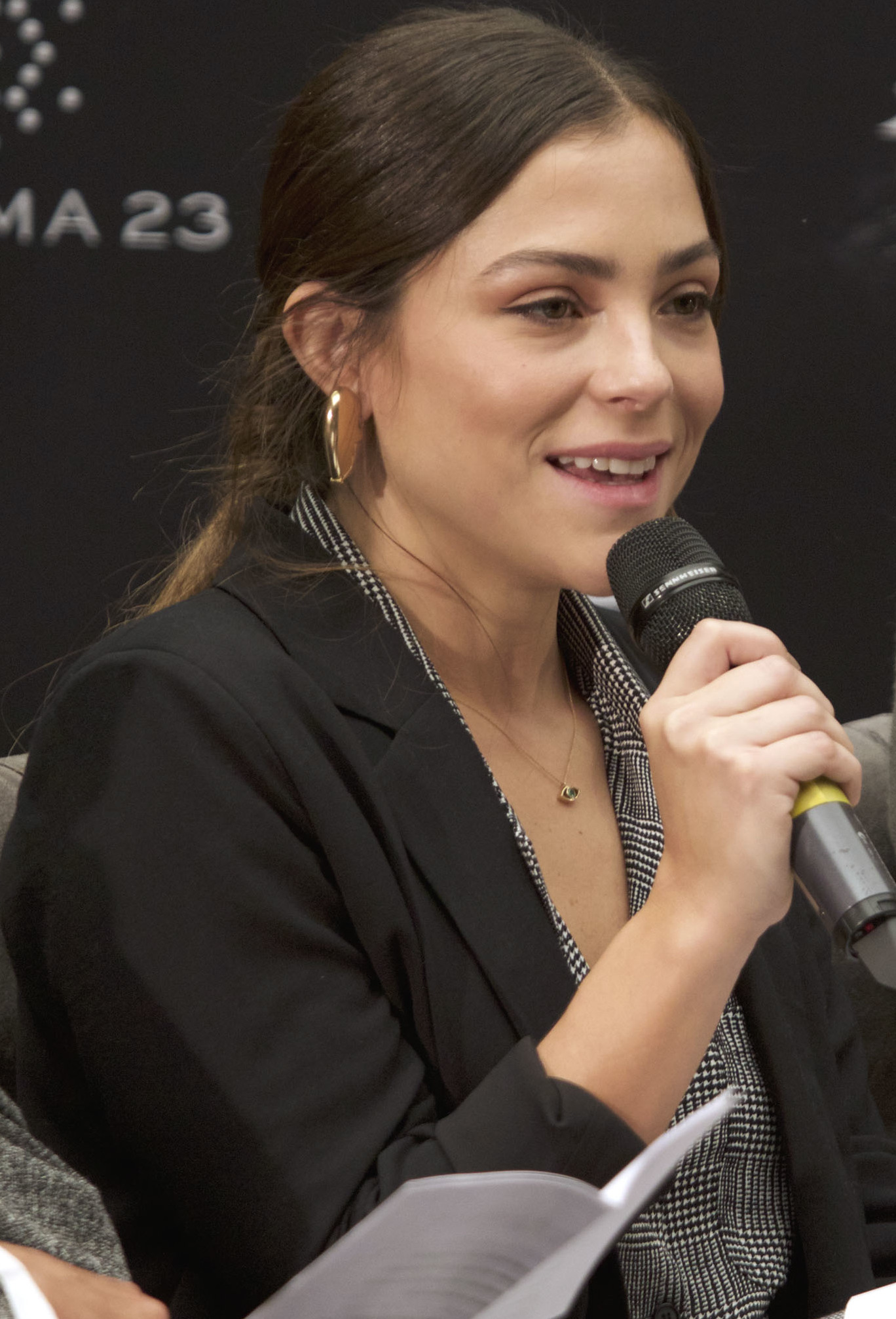
- Dávila in 2018
- Born: Maria Paulina Dávila; 18 December 1988 (age 37); Medellín, Antioquia, Colombia
- Education: Pontifical Xavierian University
- Occupation: Actress
- Years active: 2011–present

Paulina Dávila (born December 18, 1988) is a Colombian actress known for her work in both Colombian and Mexican cinema. She made her feature film debut in Fernando Frías's Rezeta and subsequently appeared as a protagonist in the 2014 series Amor sin reserva. She gained more recognition for her lead role in the 2015 film adaptation of ¡Que viva la música!, which earned her a Best Actress nomination at the 2016 Macondo Awards. Her other notable film credits include Carroña (2016) and 3 Idiotas (2017). She is also the cousin of actress Sofía Vergara.

== Early life and education ==
Paulina was born on December 18, 1988 in Medellín and grew up in Santa Marta. Her interest in acting started when she was thirteen years old when she appeared in a short film that was produced by Isabella Santodomingo in Miami She then moved to Bogotá to obtain her Visual Arts degree from the Pontificia Universidad Javeriana.

== Career ==
Her career began when she was cast by Mexican director Fernando Frías in his debut movie, Rezeta. After spending two months working on the film in Mexico, she returned to Bogotá. There, she worked in production for a year to save money for a five-month trip through Southeast Asia and India. Upon her return, she was offered the lead role in ¡Que viva la música! in 2015, a film directed by Carlos Moreno, adapted from the novel of the same name by Andrés Caicedo.

Before this movie, she starred as one of the protagonists in Amor sin reserva in 2014. In 2016, she starred in Carroña, a movie that was directed by Mexican director, Sebastián Hiriart. Then, in 2017, she starred in 3 Idiotas which is a movie adapted from 3 idiots.

== Nomination ==
She was nominated in Macondo Awards 2016 as one of the best actress in ¡Que viva la música! .

== Personal life ==
She is a cousin of Sofia Vergara. They appeared together at the 76th Primetime Emmy Awards.

== Filmography ==
Film
Year	Title	Role	Notes
2012	Rezeta	Melissa Rojas	
2015	¡Que viva la música!	María del Carmen	
2017	3 idiotas	Diana	

Television roles
Year	Title	Role	Notes
2013	Mujeres al limite	Angélica	Episode: "Hijos ajenos"
2013	Tres Caínes	Keni	
2013	Alguien más	Elena	Episode: "Trauma superado"
2014	Las trampas del deseo	Johana / Andrea	
2014	Amor sin reserva	Julia Estévez	
2016	La Hermandad	Andrea Chávez	Episode: "El regreso"
2017	El Comandante	Isabela Manrique	102 episodes
2017	Venganza	Emilia Rivera / Amanda Santana	Episode: "Emilia y Amanda se encuentran frente a frente"
2017	Las 13 esposas de Wilson Fernández	Camila	Episode: "Camila"
2018	Luis Miguel	Mariana Yazbek	Main cast (season 1); 4 episodes
2022	Ritmo Salvaje	Antonia	Main cast
2023	Ella camina sola	Carla	Main cast
2024	Griselda	Isabel	Recurring role
2024	Sin querer queriendo	Graciela Fernández	Main cast
