= Sofía Álvarez (actress, born 1958) =

Mexican actress

- Born: Sofía Calzadilla Bichara; April 29, 1958 (age 68); Mexico
- Occupations: Actress; writer
- Years active: 1963–present
- Spouse: Héctor Bonilla
- Children: Fernando Bonilla

Sofía Álvarez (born Sofía Calzadilla Bichara on April 29, 1958) is a Mexican actress and writer. She is known better for Cuenta con Sofía (1978), Sofiando (1984) and Ladies Night (2003).

== Biography ==
Álvarez was born on April 29, 1958, in Mexico. She is the daughter of dubbing director Fernando Calzadilla Álvarez. She took her stage name from her paternal grandmother, the Colombian-born actress and singer Sofía Álvarez. Her debut career started in 1963 at 5 years old, dubbing several films like The third secret. She also lent her voice to several television series. In 1978, she joined Canal 11 in Mexico, where she presented the program Cuenta con Sofía. In 1979 she played in the film Maria de mi corazón in which she met Héctor Bonilla and the director Jaime Humberto Hermosillo.

Animated by Héctor Bonilla, Sofia switched to the television Televisa, in which both shared credits in the telenovela Atrapada, at the end of this production in 1992, Bonilla is vetoed from the television station and next to Sofía are again integrated into the ranks of TvAzteca. In 1994, Sophia starred in the episode "Andamos brujas" of the series of television Entre vivos y muertos. In 2003 she appeared in the film Ladies night. In 2005 she appeared to the cast of the telenovela La otra mitad del sol.

In 2014 she appeared in the cast telenovela Amor sin reserva and in 2015 played in the film Refugio.

Álvarez was married to actor Héctor Bonilla until his death in 2022. Their son, Fernando Bonilla, is also an actor.

== Filmography ==
Television, Telenovelas, Films, Producer, Writer
Year	Title	Role	Notes
1964	The third secret	Catherine Whitset	Dubbing Mexican version
1978-1984	Cuenta con Sofía		Writer/Various characters
1979	María de mi corazón		Film
1983	El corazón de la noche		Film
1984/1990	Sofiando		Writer/Various characters
1989	El cuento para no bañarse		Writer
1990	Rojo Amanecer		Producer
1991/92	Atrapada	Alicia Montero	Supporting role
1994	Entre vivos y muertos	Águeda Meléndez	1 Episode: "Andamos brujas"
1994	Fantas unido jamás será vencido		Short film
2000	Crónica de un desayuno		Producer
2003	Ladies night		Film
2005	La otra mitad del sol	Margarita	Supporting role
2006	Almacenados		Theater producer
2006	Ataque de pánico		Theater producer
2006	López Velarde, la noche del poeta		Theater producer
2007	Conspiración		Theater producer
2007	La lucha se hace		Theater producer
2007	El día que me quieras		Theater producer
2007	Aquel tiempo de campeones		Theater producer
2009	Cuenta con Sofía		Various characters
2014	Amor sin reserva	Miranda	Special Appearance
2015	Refugio		Film
2015	Specter		Film
2016	Un Cuento de Circo & A Love Song		Film
2016	Finding Dory	Jenny	Dubbing Mexican version
2017	Ana y Bruno	Black widow	Animated Film

== Theatre ==
- Cuenta con Sofía
- Emociones encontradas
- En retirada
- Tríptico de guerra
- Los monólogos de la vagina
- Cabos sueltos
- El extranjero
- Magnolias de acero
- Amor y crimen en la casa de Dios
- Menoclownsia (2014-2015) - Menoclownsia

== Discography ==
- "Cuento de navidad" (1983)
