= Las Poquianchis =

Mexican family of serial killers

María Delfina González Valenzuela (1912 – 17 October 1968), María del Carmen González Valenzuela (1918–1949), María Luisa González Valenzuela (1920 – 19 November 1984) and María de Jesús González Valenzuela (1924–1990), known as Las Poquianchis, were four sisters from the western Mexican state of Jalisco. From 1950 until 1964, the sisters ran "Rancho El Ángel", the locus of their large-scale prostitution ring and the site of the murder of at least 91 people, but it is believed that the four sisters killed more than 150 people or even more than 200 people. Guinness World Records called them the "most prolific murder partnership".

== Biography ==
The sisters were born in the rural town of El Salto de Juanacatlán, Jalisco, to Isidro Torres, a policeman, and his wife, Bernardina Valenzuela. Their father was reportedly a strict man who expected his daughters to not wear makeup or interact with boys. If they broke his rules, the sisters were punished by beatings or confinement in the very jail cells where he interrogated prisoners. Contemporary and later accounts report that their father was a policeman with a reputation for brutality and alcoholism.

Following an incident where Isidro Torres shot and killed a man with his service pistol during a heated argument, the family had to relocate to the village of San Francisco del Rincón, Guanajuato, where they had to change their surname. The resulting loss of income and isolation caused them to sink into deep poverty.

With their father's abuse worsening, the sisters pooled their money to open a bar to support themselves financially. The bar was unsuccessful, and in desperation the sisters allowed local prostitutes to illegally use their backroom for servicing clients. This proved to be much more lucrative, and the sisters quickly moved into working as brothel keepers, converting their bar and opening additional establishments throughout Jalisco, Guanajuato and Querétaro.

The police picked up a woman named Josefina Gutiérrez, a procuress, on suspicion of kidnapping young girls in the Guanajuato city area, and during questioning, she implicated the González sisters. Police officers searched the sisters' property near San Francisco del Rincón and found the bodies of eighty women, eleven men, and several fetuses. Investigations revealed that the sisters' criminal operation recruited prostitutes through deceptive help-wanted ads for housemaids. Many of the girls were force-fed heroin or cocaine until they became addicted and thus more willing to prostitute themselves. The sisters killed the prostitutes when they became too ill, damaged by repeated sexual activity, lost their looks, or stopped pleasing the customers.

They also murdered several customers who were known to have large sums of money on them. When asked for an explanation for the deaths, one of the sisters reportedly said, "The food didn't sit well with them." Tried in 1964, the González sisters were each sentenced to forty years in prison. In prison, Delfina died due to an accident where a construction worker heard her and tried to catch a glimpse at the serial murderer before accidentally dumping cement on her head. María de Jésus finished her sentence and dropped out of sight after her release. Although they are often cited as the killers, there were two other sisters who helped in their crimes: Carmen and María Luisa. Carmen died of cancer whilst still in prison; María Luisa went mad because she feared that she would be killed by angry protesters.

== Origin of Las Poquianchis ==
Before the nickname was given to the González Valenzuela sisters, and the sensational media coverage that followed their gruesome crimes, las poquianchis did not have the notorious meaning it carries in Mexico today. The term la poquianchi in Mexican Spanish carries a layered and rather dark cultural history. It is a diminutive, with the prefix poqu- meaning tiny. Allegedly, it was a regional slang term for male homosexual transvestites and that during the investigations into the González Valenzuela sisters’ crimes, it emerged that the owner of a nightclub, which the sisters bought, was nicknamed la Poquianchi. Alternatively, in central Mexico there were vague regional words such as poquianchi that refer to the underworld cleaner.

== Popular culture ==
The sisters and their crimes were dramatized in the Felipe Cazals film Las Poquianchis (1976) and the Jorge Ibargüengoitia novel Las muertas (1977).

Netflix premiered a miniseries based on Jorge Ibargüengoitia's novel on 10 September 2025.

== See also ==
- List of serial killers by country
- Most prolific murderers by number of victims

== Bibliography ==
- Peter Vronsky: Female Serial Killers: How and Why Women Become Monsters, Berkley Books, New York (2007), p. 440
