= Mejorada del Campo =

- Municipality
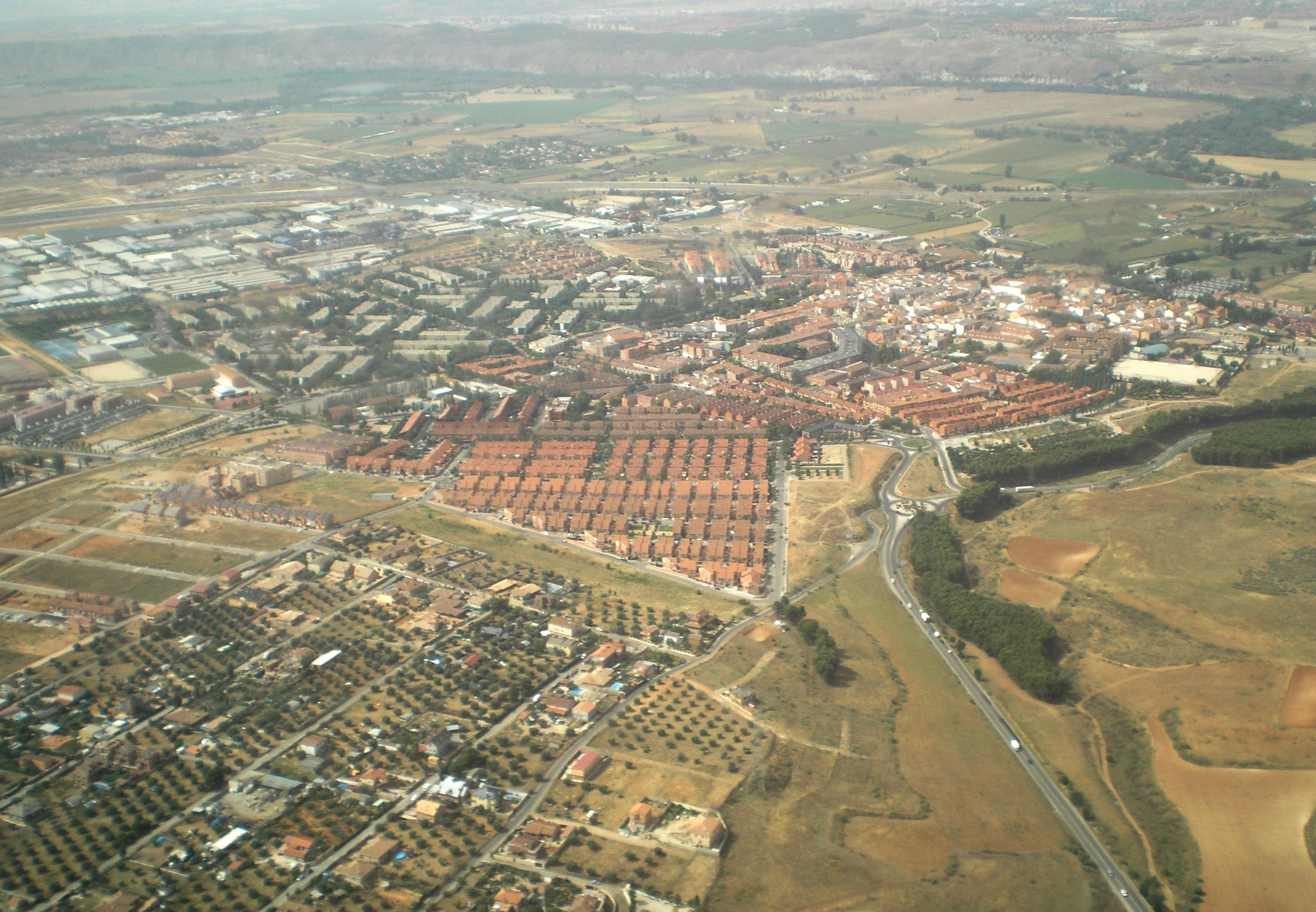
- Aerial view

- Seal

- Location within Spain
- Coordinates: 40°23′48″N 3°23′9″W
- Country: Spain
- Autonomous community: Community of Madrid

Area
  - Total: 17.21 km^{2} (6.64 sq mi)

Population (2025-01-01)
  - Total: 25,049
- Time zone: UTC+1 (CET)
  - Summer (DST): UTC+2 (CEST)

Mejorada del Campo is a municipality of Spain belonging to the Community of Madrid.

== History ==
Mejorada del Campo is first mentioned in a 1247 document, as one of the several places belonging to the personal lordship of the Bishops of Segovia south of the Sistema Central. Mejorada was incorporated to the Crown's dominions and properties in 1574.

== Architecture ==
The town is known for its Cathedral of Justo. It is the magnum opus of former monk, Justo Gallego Martínez, who begun its construction on 12 October 1961. The historic Chapel of San Fausto also stands in the town.

== See also ==
- Avianca Flight 011, a Colombian airliner that crashed in this town.
