= Joy Laville =

English painter

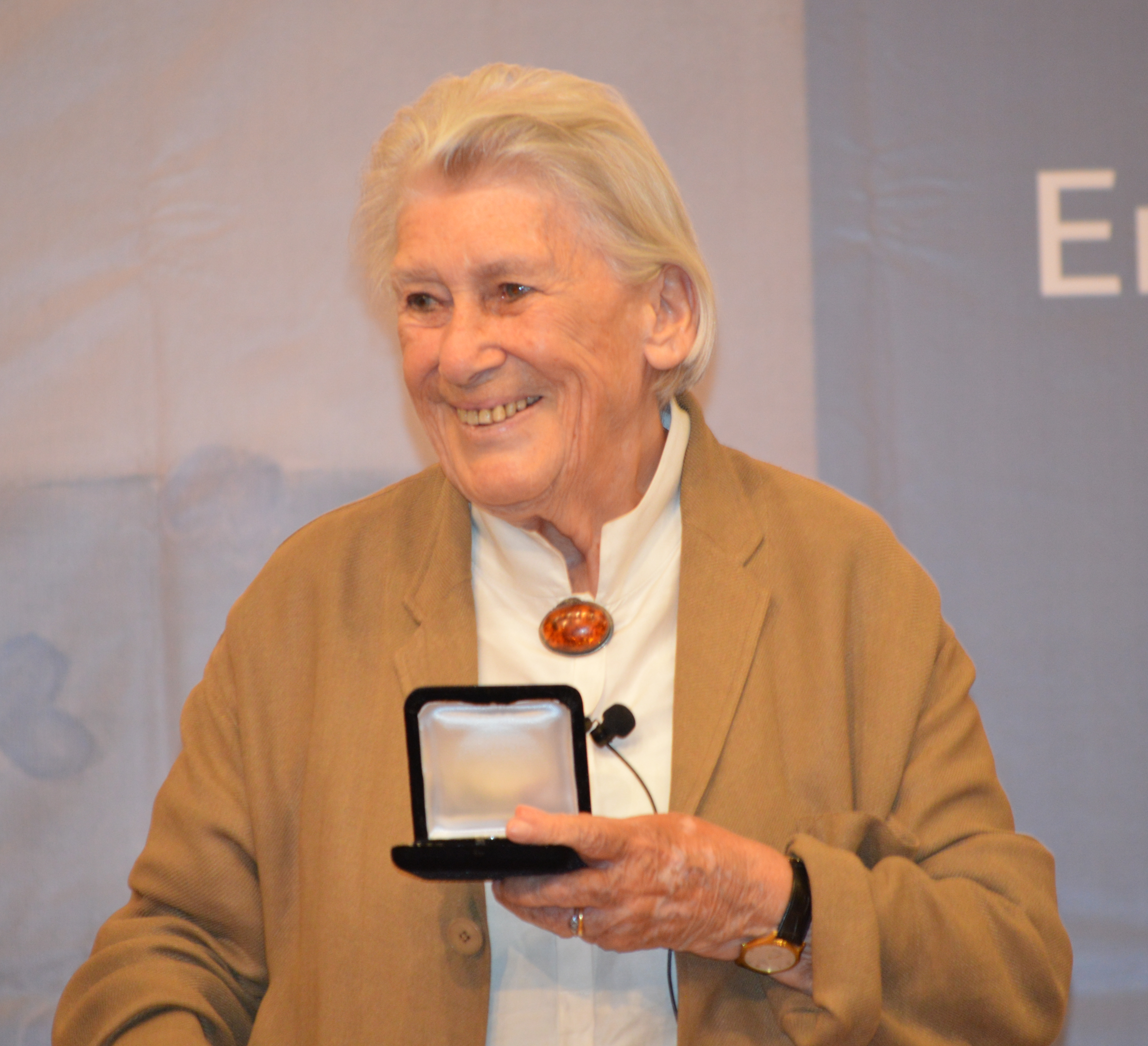
Joy Laville receiving the Bellas Artes Medal in 2012

Joy Laville (September 8, 1923 – April 13, 2018) was an English/Mexican artist whose art career began and mostly developed in Mexico when she came to the country to take art classes in San Miguel de Allende. While there she met Mexican writer Jorge Ibargüengoitia, whom she married in 1973. During this time her art career developed mostly in pastels with a reflective quality. In 1983, Ibargüengoitia died in a plane crash in Spain and Laville's painting changed dramatically. Since that time, her work has focused on the loss of her husband, directly or indirectly with themes of finality, eternity and wondering what more is there. Her work has been exhibited in Mexico and abroad including the Palacio de Bellas Artes and the Museo de Arte Moderno. In 2012, she received the Bellas Artes Medal for her life's work.

== Life ==
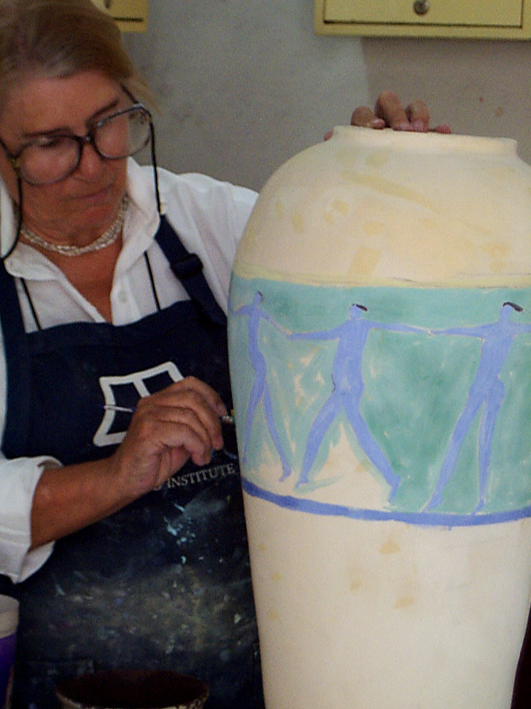
Laville working on a ceramic piece at the Uriarte Talavera workshop in Puebla

Joy Laville was born in Ryde on the Isle of Wight . Her father was Francis Laville, a captain in the Indian Army of the Seventh Rajput Regiment. Her mother was Vera Elizabeth Perren. While Joy was conceived in India, her mother decided to go to England to give birth because she lost her first pregnancy. Her parents divorced shortly after her younger sister, Rosemarie, was born and Joy was five. Her mother remarried shortly after and her father died in 1939 from tuberculosis .

Joy describes herself as a child as quiet and sensitive but happy, near the ocean with her talent for drawing appearing early. As a child she took ballet and piano classes. One frequent drawing was that of ballerinas.

When the Second World War began, Joy and her sister had to leave school and stay home. Bored, she demanded art classes and her mother sent her to an art school in the south of England. Due to the needs of the war, Joy soon joined the Observer Corps in Yorkshire, where she worked to detect and map the movement of Allied and Axis planes as they flew over England. The war took its toll and she learned that life was fragile. This made her rebellious and libertine in young adulthood. At age 17 she fell in love with a Jewish refugee named Julius Taussky but her mother and stepfather would not let her marry because of her age.

Later, Joy met Kenneth Rowe, an artilleryman with the Royal Canadian Air Force which whom she married at age 21 and went to live in Canada. She says the marriage was a mistake, more to run away from England than anything, living in Canada from 1947 to 1956. In Canada, her husband obtained a permit to log in the forests of British Columbia, which led the couple to live in very remote locations. She said she loved the vast forest but it was a lonely existence, far from civilization. She began to read anything she could get to pass the time. Later, in 1951, her only son, Trevor, was born in Prince George, as she worked as a secretary and took painting classes. However, she became increasingly dissatisfied with the marriage, feeling “petrified” and not only decided to leave her husband, but also Canada. Like her own mother, she left Trevor's father when Trevor was five and decided to move to Mexico to make a clean break.

Of Mexico, all she knew that it was cheap to live there from books such as Under the Volcano by Malcolm Lowry . She wrote to the Mexican consulate in Vancouver asking where to live with her five-year-old son and study art. They suggested San Miguel de Allende. She arrived in 1956, not knowing any Spanish and began her social live with other foreigners. She rented a house and began to take classes. She lived in San Miguel de Allende for twelve years. From 1956 to 1958, she studied at the Instituto Allende, which would be her only formal art training. Afterwards, she experimented with a number of artistic styles from the 20th century including Cubism and Abstract Expressionism. Eventually she established her own style and this is when galleries began to be interested in her work. To live, she worked at the Institute in the mornings and painted during the rest of the day. Her first paintings at this time were signed with her first married name H. J. Rowe.

In 1959, she met painter Roger von Gunten with whom she has been friends and colleagues since. At the beginning of the 1970s, Von Gunten moved in with her and helped her develop as an artist for two years until he decided to return to Mexico City.

After leaving the Instituto Allende, she began working in a bookstore called El Colibrí. She met Jorge Ibargüengoitia in the summer of 1964, but they did not start dating until the following year. She moved to Mexico City in 1968 after she sent her son off to college in Vancouver. They first lived in an apartment that Jorge built on his mother's property. They married on November 10, 1973. When his mother died, the couple decided to live in Europe, spending time in London, Greece and Spain before settling in Paris in 1980. Ibargüengoitia called her “la mujer lila” or the “lily woman” and sometimes referred to her as “Cleo” in his writings.

Ibargüengoita died in an airplane crash on November 27, 1983, in Spain, while Laville was at their home in Paris. She continued to live in Paris until 1985 when she returned to Mexico because, she said, she felt at home there. She then went to live near Cuernavaca, bringing Jorge's private library with her as well as his ashes. She kept them for fifteen years until she was convinced to inter them at the Parque Antillon in front of the house where he was born.

She later lived in the town of Jiutepec, near Cuernavaca, still painting for several hours per day. True to her English roots, she likes whiskey but likes tequila as well. She occasionally travelled to the UK for periods of time. Her house was filled with books which cover tables and chairs, as well as her paintings, which could be found even in the bathrooms. There were also many photos of her son Trevor, her granddaughter Isabella, and her husband Jorge.

== Career ==
After finishing at the Instituto Allende she experimented, establishing her own style. She had her first exhibition in Mexico City in 1964 and two years later her work appeared at the Confrontación 66 event at the Palacio de Bellas Artes, winning an acquisition prize. That show led to an invitation to exhibit with Inés Amor at the Galería de Arte Mexicano, in which she exhibited regularly afterwards.

Jorge Ibargüengoita later urged Laville to keep a log of her paintings and he photographed each one. He also brought her work to the attention of Inés Amor, the owner of the largest and most prestigious gallery in Mexico City. For her first individual exhibition at this museum, Ibargüengoitia wrote about one of the images in the catalog. After that she exhibited her work in various cities in Mexico as well as New York, New Orleans, Dallas, Washington, Toronto, Paris, London and Barcelona . Her major exhibitions include those in 1966, 1968 and 1985 at the Palacio de Bellas Artes as well as two in 1974 and 2004 at the Museo de Arte Moderno . The 2004 exhibit at the Museo de Arte Moderno was a major retrospective of her work in 2004 with 94 pieces.

Her work has been featured on the covers of books written by her husband and has been an artist in residence for the Universidad de la Américas. Her work can be found in the collections of the Dallas Museum, the National Museum for Women in the Arts in Washington, the Museo de Arte Moderno and the collections of the Banco Nacional de México, BBVA Bancomer and Esso Oil of Canada.

Her work individually and collectively has earned her a number of recognitions. In 1966 she received the Acquisition Prize from the Palacio de Bellas Artes during the Confrontación 66 event. She was received by the Mexican Senate in 2011 as a candidate for the Premio Nacional de Ciencias y Artes . In 2012, she was awarded the Bellas Artes Medal in 2012 for her life's work. She is a member of the Sistema Nacional de Creadores in Mexico.

== Artistry ==
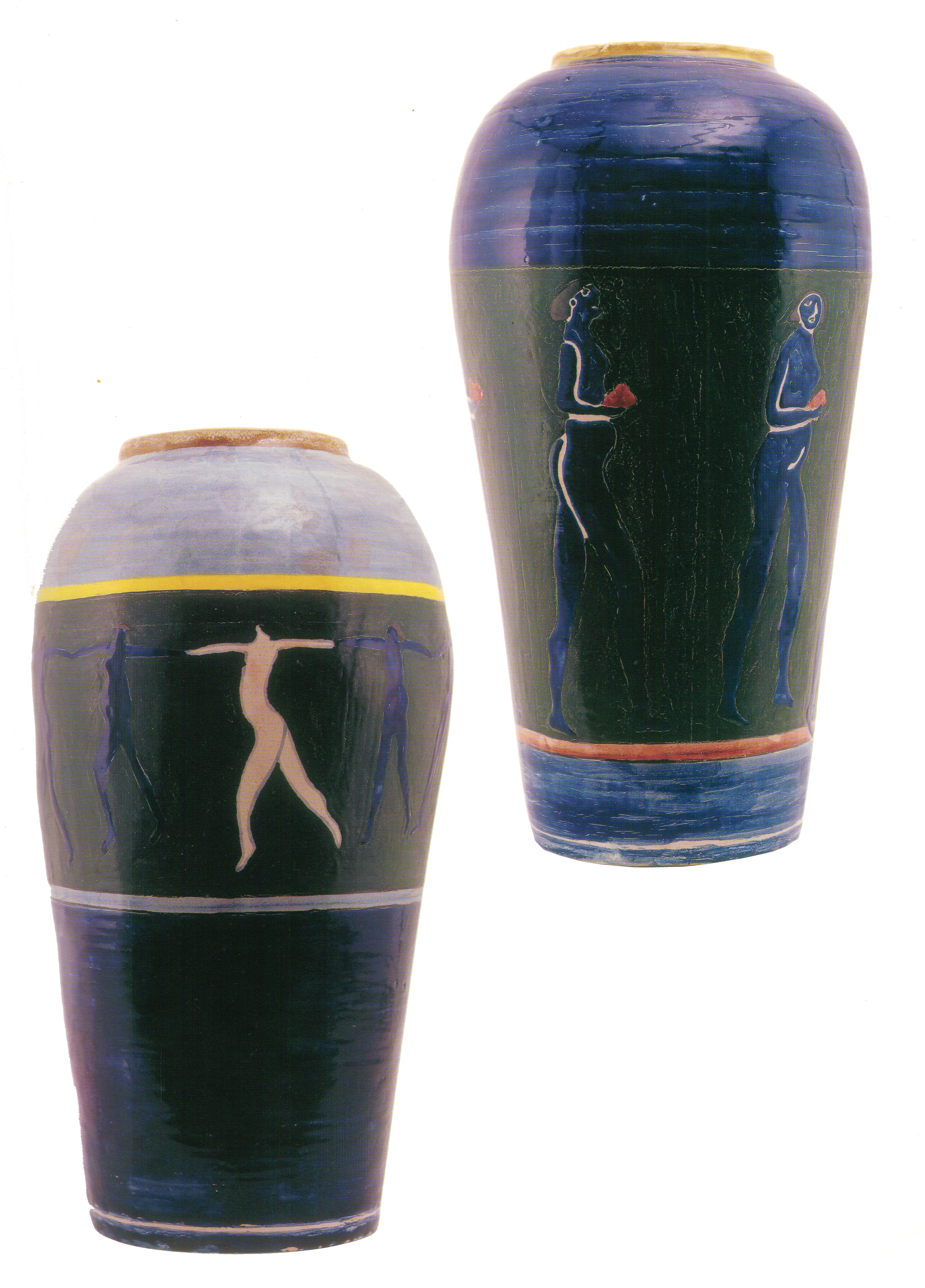
Two ceramic pieces painted by the artist for Uriarte Talavera

Although best known for painting (oils and acrylics), Laville has done a number of projects including graphics, pastels and sculpture. She created prints with the Tamarind Institute in Los Angeles. One of her bronze sculptures called Libertad de bronce was unveiled on Paseo de la Reforma in 2000.

Laville has been classed as part of the Generación de la Ruptura in Mexico.(arthistory) Generationally, she is between the Mexican muralism school and the Ruptura. While she never followed the tenets of the muralism movement, she did not work to challenge it, like the Generación de la Ruptura did. She has stated that she is part of no artistic movement or idealism; she simply paints in her own way. However, she has always called herself a Mexican painter, as she began her art career in the country as well as did most of her artistic work, denying that her childhood in England or stay in Canada have any influence in her work. Art critic Santiago Espinosa de los Monteros has said that her work would be inexplicable without Mexico as a context.

She says that her first influence on her art was James Pinto but the most important is that of Roger von Gunten. She has admired the work of Lilia Carrillo and Francisco Corzas . Her work shows well integrated influences from artists such as Matisse (composition with flowers), Marie Laurencin (use of faceless female figures), and David Hockney (use of flat surfaces to bring order to a composition). Her work has been compared to that of Milton Avery as both use wide, monochromatic spaces to convey a sense of suspended time as well as pastel colors and figures with fuzzy boundaries. However, Laville's work is more reflective and more sensuous.

There are two main phases to Laville's work, separated by the untimely death of her husband in 1983. The first covers her development as an artist through her marriage. Until her husband's death, Laville's art mostly reflected the everyday in life with a contemplative quality, with self-portraits and landscapes dominating. However, during this time there is significant change. In the 1960s she generally used darker colors. Starting in the 1970s, she began to use pastels, focusing on blues, pinks and light purples. Her most evolved works were leitmotifs and self-portraits. Before her marriage, she painted herself and small, dark and shy, but during her marriage, her image of herself became larger and more defined. Ibargüengoitia described her paintings as neither symbolic, allegorical nor realistic, rather “they are a window into a mysteriously familiar world. They are enigmas which are not necessary to resolve, but it is interesting to perceive them.” Oddly, just before the accident in 1982, she painted a scene similar to those she would afterwards: a woman with no eyes sitting along in a desert of pinks and other colors. She now calls that painting “Annuciation.”

After Ibargüengoitia's death in a plane crash in November 1983, Laville stopped painting completely until March 1984. At that time she went to Mexico City to settle her husband's estate and visit the places she and Ibargüengoitia lived and spent time. Nothing looked the same but the experience pushed her to paint again. After that, it became an evolving diary of her grief and how her loss reshaped how she saw the world. Most of these works do not show pleasure but rather pain, and often with anger and depression. The colors in her work became sharper and stiff. Cracks and wedges in walls became common as a symbol of pent up frustration. Her first works from this time are four gouache paintings which mark the transition of her work. One of these paintings shows a woman with one eye with an airplane in the background falling and breaking up. It also refers to the place where Laville has to identify Ibargüengoitia's body. These paintings were followed by a series called Landfalls and Departures which explored the inevitable loss after forming attachments based on the dreams she has after her husband's death. Elements such as airplanes and missing body parts still appear in her work.

Her grief turned to acceptance of her loss to some extent and a wonder about what happens after death. The earliest of this kind of paintings is Man Jumping Off a Rock (1986) and Man Leaving a Boat (1986). Starting with these, the sea and the horizon become metaphors for death but the image is tranquil. She work emphasizes blues, greens and whites for similar reasons, symbols of water and of peace. She remains interested in the end, infinity, death, apocalypse, paradise, eternity and immortality, with the idea of trying to name the unnamable. Figures are often small in front of vast expanses of space. The horizon appears as a limit to knowledge, as an arrival but not a destination and a juncture between heaven and earth. In much of her work, the horizon is meant to symbolize another realm. Her paintings evoke tranquility, and solace but also solitude. She died in Cuernavaca.
