= List of Criminal Minds episodes =

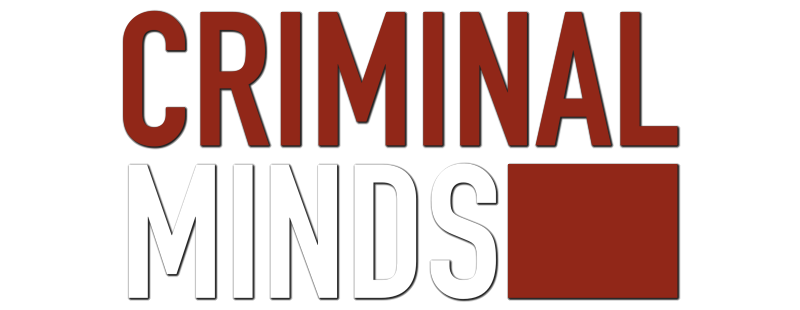

Criminal Minds is an American police procedural drama television series that premiered on CBS on September 22, 2005. It follows a team of profilers from the FBI's Behavioral Analysis Unit (BAU) based in Quantico, Virginia. The BAU is part of the FBI National Center for the Analysis of Violent Crime. The show differs from many procedural dramas by focusing on profiling the criminal, called the unsub or "unknown subject", rather than the crime itself.

The BAU consists of special agents Dr. Spencer Reid, Jennifer "JJ" Jareau, Penelope Garcia, Emily Prentiss, David Rossi, Dr. Tara Lewis, Luke Alvez, and Matt Simmons as they try to profile the Unknown Subject (UnSub). Other former characters are Elle Greenaway, Jason Gideon, Jordan Todd, Ashley Seaver, Dr. Alex Blake, Kate Callahan, Derek Morgan, Aaron "Hotch" Hotchner and Stephen Walker.

In January 2019, CBS renewed the series for a fifteenth and final season, which would air from January 8 to February 19, 2020. Two years later, the series was revived on Paramount+ as Criminal Minds: Evolution. Its first season, which was later dubbed the sixteenth season overall, premiered on November 24, 2022.

As of July 23, 2026, 364 episodes of Criminal Minds have been released, concluding the nineteenth season. In March 2025, Criminal Minds was renewed for a nineteenth season, which premiered on May 28, 2026. In March 2026, Criminal Minds was renewed for a twentieth season.

== Series overview ==
Season	Episodes	Originally released		
Season	Episodes	First released	Last released	Network
Criminal Minds
1	22	September 22, 2005	May 10, 2006	CBS
2	23	September 20, 2006	May 16, 2007	CBS
3	20	September 26, 2007	May 21, 2008	CBS
4	26	September 24, 2008	May 20, 2009	CBS
5	23	September 23, 2009	May 26, 2010	CBS
6	24	September 22, 2010	May 18, 2011	CBS
7	24	September 21, 2011	May 16, 2012	CBS
8	24	September 26, 2012	May 22, 2013	CBS
9	24	September 25, 2013	May 14, 2014	CBS
10	23	October 1, 2014	May 6, 2015	CBS
11	22	September 30, 2015	May 4, 2016	CBS
12	22	September 28, 2016	May 10, 2017	CBS
13	22	September 27, 2017	April 18, 2018	CBS
14	15	October 3, 2018	February 6, 2019	CBS
15	10	January 8, 2020	February 19, 2020	CBS
Criminal Minds: Evolution
16	10	November 24, 2022	February 9, 2023	Paramount+
17	10	June 6, 2024	August 1, 2024	Paramount+
18	10	May 8, 2025	July 10, 2025	Paramount+
19	10	May 28, 2026	July 23, 2026	Paramount+

== Criminal Minds episodes ==
=== Season 1 (2005–06) ===
No. overall	No. in season	Title	Directed by	Written by	Original release date	Prod. code	U.S. viewers (millions)
1	1	"Extreme Aggressor"	Richard Shepard	Jeff Davis	September 22, 2005	101	19.57
2	2	"Compulsion"	Charles Haid	Jeff Davis	September 28, 2005	102	10.57
3	3	"Won't Get Fooled Again"	Kevin Bray	Aaron Zelman	October 5, 2005	103	11.98
4	4	"Plain Sight"	Matt Earl Beesley	Edward Allen Bernero	October 12, 2005	104	13.76
5	5	"Broken Mirror"	Guy Norman Bee	Judith McCreary	October 19, 2005	105	12.79
6	6	"L.D.S.K."	Ernest Dickerson	Andrew Wilder	November 2, 2005	106	16.22
7	7	"The Fox"	Guy Norman Bee	Simon Mirren	November 9, 2005	107	15.09
8	8	"Natural Born Killer"	Peter Ellis	Debra J. Fisher & Erica Messer	November 16, 2005	109	14.36
9	9	"Derailed"	Félix Alcalá	Jeff Davis	November 23, 2005	108	12.83
10	10	"The Popular Kids"	Andy Wolk	Edward Allen Bernero	November 30, 2005	110	15.56
11	11	"Blood Hungry"	Charles Haid	Ed Napier	December 14, 2005	111	15.23
12	12	"What Fresh Hell?"	Adam Davidson	Judith McCreary	January 11, 2006	112	15.92
13	13	"Poison"	Thomas J. Wright	Aaron Zelman	January 18, 2006	113	14.10
14	14	"Riding the Lightning"	Chris Long	Simon Mirren	January 25, 2006	114	14.65
15	15	"Unfinished Business"	J. Miller Tobin	Debra J. Fisher & Erica Messer	March 1, 2006	115	11.72
16	16	"The Tribe"	Matt Earl Beesley	Andrew Wilder	March 8, 2006	116	15.27
17	17	"A Real Rain"	Gloria Muzio	Chris Mundy	March 22, 2006	117	12.10
18	18	"Somebody's Watching"	Paul Shapiro	Ed Napier	March 29, 2006	118	12.54
19	19	"Machismo"	Guy Norman Bee	Aaron Zelman	April 12, 2006	119	11.76
20	20	"Charm and Harm"	Félix Alcalá	Debra J. Fisher & Erica Messer	April 19, 2006	120	13.53
21	21	"Secrets and Lies"	Matt Earl Beesley	Simon Mirren	May 3, 2006	121	12.17
22	22	"The Fisher King: Part 1"	Edward Allen Bernero	Edward Allen Bernero	May 10, 2006	122	12.67

=== Season 2 (2006–07) ===
No. overall	No. in season	Title	Directed by	Written by	Original release date	Prod. code	U.S. viewers (millions)
23	1	"The Fisher King: Part 2"	Gloria Muzio	Edward Allen Bernero	September 20, 2006	201	15.65
24	2	"P911"	Adam Davidson	Simon Mirren	September 27, 2006	203	16.54
25	3	"The Perfect Storm"	Félix Alcalá	Debra J. Fisher & Erica Messer	October 4, 2006	202	15.19
26	4	"Psychodrama"	Guy Norman Bee	Aaron Zelman	October 11, 2006	204	16.73
27	5	"The Aftermath"	Tim Matheson	Chris Mundy	October 18, 2006	205	16.20
28	6	"The Boogeyman"	Steve Boyum	Andi Bushell	October 25, 2006	206	16.77
29	7	"North Mammon"	Matt Earl Beesley	Andrew Wilder	November 1, 2006	207	16.97
30	8	"Empty Planet"	Elodie Keene	Ed Napier	November 8, 2006	208	17.57
31	9	"The Last Word"	Gloria Muzio	Debra J. Fisher & Erica Messer	November 15, 2006	209	16.48
32	10	"Lessons Learned"	Guy Norman Bee	Jim Clemente	November 22, 2006	210	16.56
33	11	"Sex, Birth, Death"	Gwyneth Horder-Payton	Chris Mundy	November 29, 2006	211	17.92
34	12	"Profiler, Profiled"	Glenn Kershaw	Edward Allen Bernero	December 13, 2006	212	16.06
35	13	"No Way Out"	John Gallagher	Simon Mirren	January 17, 2007	213	12.99
36	14	"The Big Game"	Gloria Muzio	Edward Allen Bernero	February 4, 2007	215	26.31
37	15	"Revelations"	Guy Norman Bee	Chris Mundy	February 7, 2007	216	16.27
38	16	"Fear and Loathing"	Rob Spera	Aaron Zelman	February 14, 2007	214	15.16
39	17	"Distress"	John F. Showalter	Oanh Ly	February 21, 2007	217	13.71
40	18	"Jones"	Steve Shill	Andi Bushell	February 28, 2007	218	14.50
41	19	"Ashes and Dust"	John Gallagher	Andrew Wilder	March 21, 2007	219	15.19
42	20	"Honor Among Thieves"	Jesús Treviño	Aaron Zelman	April 11, 2007	220	12.80
43	21	"Open Season"	Félix Alcalá	Debra J. Fisher & Erica Messer	May 2, 2007	222	13.28
44	22	"Legacy"	Glenn Kershaw	Edward Allen Bernero	May 9, 2007	223	12.92
45	23	"No Way Out, Part II: The Evilution of Frank"	Edward Allen Bernero	Simon Mirren	May 16, 2007	224	13.21

=== Season 3 (2007–08) ===
No. overall	No. in season	Title	Directed by	Written by	Original release date	Prod. code	U.S. viewers (millions)
46	1	"Doubt"	Gloria Muzio	Chris Mundy	September 26, 2007	221	12.66
47	2	"In Name and Blood"	Edward Allen Bernero	Chris Mundy	October 3, 2007	301	14.56
48	3	"Scared to Death"	Félix Alcalá	Debra J. Fisher & Erica Messer	October 10, 2007	302	14.55
49	4	"Children of the Dark"	Guy Norman Bee	Dan Dworkin & Jay Beattie	October 17, 2007	303	15.03
50	5	"Seven Seconds"	John Gallagher	Andi Bushell	October 24, 2007	304	15.05
51	6	"About Face"	Skipp Sudduth	Charles Murray	October 31, 2007	305	14.94
52	7	"Identity"	Gwyneth Horder-Payton	Oanh Ly	November 7, 2007	306	14.65
53	8	"Lucky"	Steve Boyum	Andrew Wilder	November 14, 2007	307	15.73
54	9	"Penelope"	Félix Alcalá	Chris Mundy	November 21, 2007	308	15.88
55	10	"True Night"	Edward Allen Bernero	Edward Allen Bernero	November 28, 2007	309	16.23
56	11	"Birthright"	John Gallagher	Debra J. Fisher & Erica Messer	December 12, 2007	310	14.18
57	12	"3rd Life"	Anthony Hemingway	Simon Mirren	January 9, 2008	311	14.30
58	13	"Limelight"	Glenn Kershaw	Dan Dworkin & Jay Beattie	January 23, 2008	312	12.67
59	14	"Damaged"	Edward Allen Bernero	Edward Allen Bernero	April 2, 2008	313	12.81
60	15	"A Higher Power"	Félix Alcalá	Michael Udesky	April 9, 2008	314	13.33
61	16	"Elephant's Memory"	Bobby Roth	Andrew S. Wilder	April 16, 2008	315	12.98
62	17	"In Heat"	John Gallagher	Andi Bushell	April 30, 2008	316	13.03
63	18	"The Crossing"	Guy Norman Bee	Debra J. Fisher & Erica Messer	May 7, 2008	317	12.88
64	19	"Tabula Rasa"	Steve Boyum	Dan Dworkin & Jay Beattie	May 14, 2008	318	12.88
65	20	"Lo-Fi"	Glenn Kershaw	Chris Mundy	May 21, 2008	319	13.15

=== Season 4 (2008–09) ===
No. overall	No. in season	Title	Directed by	Written by	Original release date	Prod. code	U.S. viewers (millions)
66	1	"Mayhem"	Edward Allen Bernero	Simon Mirren	September 24, 2008	401	17.01
67	2	"The Angel Maker"	Glenn Kershaw	Dan Dworkin & Jay Beattie	October 1, 2008	402	14.78
68	3	"Minimal Loss"	Félix Alcalá	Andrew Wilder	October 8, 2008	403	16.19
69	4	"Paradise"	John Gallagher	Debra J. Fisher & Erica Messer	October 22, 2008	404	15.01
70	5	"Catching Out"	Charles Haid	Oanh Ly	October 29, 2008	406	13.97
71	6	"The Instincts"	Rob Spera	Chris Mundy	November 5, 2008	405	14.30
72	7	"Memoriam"	Guy Norman Bee	Dan Dworkin & Jay Beattie	November 12, 2008	407	14.83
73	8	"Masterpiece"	Paul Michael Glaser	Edward Allen Bernero	November 19, 2008	408	16.33
74	9	"52 Pickup"	Bobby Roth	Breen Frazier	November 26, 2008	409	14.11
75	10	"Brothers in Arms"	Glenn Kershaw	Holly Harold	December 10, 2008	410	14.68
76	11	"Normal"	Steve Boyum	Andrew S. Wilder	December 17, 2008	411	15.16
77	12	"Soul Mates"	John Gallagher	Debra J. Fisher & Erica Messer	January 14, 2009	412	13.78
78	13	"Bloodline"	Tim Matheson	Mark Linehan Bruner	January 21, 2009	413	13.82
79	14	"Cold Comfort"	Anna J. Foerster	Dan Dworkin & Jay Beattie	February 11, 2009	414	12.48
80	15	"Zoe's Reprise"	Charles S. Carroll	Oanh Ly	February 18, 2009	415	14.54
81	16	"Pleasure Is My Business"	Gwyneth Horder-Payton	Breen Frazier	February 25, 2009	416	13.93
82	17	"Demonology"	Edward Allen Bernero	Chris Mundy	March 11, 2009	417	14.34
83	18	"Omnivore"	Nelson McCormick	Andrew S. Wilder	March 18, 2009	418	13.74
84	19	"House on Fire"	Félix Alcalá	Holly Harold	March 25, 2009	419	14.36
85	20	"Conflicted"	Jason Alexander	Rick Dunkle	April 8, 2009	420	13.61
86	21	"A Shade of Gray"	Karen Gaviola	Debra J. Fisher & Erica Messer	April 22, 2009	421	13.72
87	22	"The Big Wheel"	Rob Hardy	Simon Mirren	April 29, 2009	422	13.61
88	23	"Roadkill"	Steve Boyum	Dan Dworkin & Jay Beattie	May 6, 2009	423	14.13
89	24	"Amplification"	John Gallagher	Oanh Ly	May 13, 2009	424	13.37
90	25	"To Hell…"	Charles Haid	Chris Mundy	May 20, 2009	425	13.99
91	26	"…and Back"	Edward Allen Bernero	Edward Allen Bernero	May 20, 2009	426	13.99

=== Season 5 (2009–10) ===
No. overall	No. in season	Title	Directed by	Written by	Original release date	Prod. code	U.S. viewers (millions)
92	1	"Nameless, Faceless"	Charles S. Carroll	Chris Mundy	September 23, 2009	501	15.84
93	2	"Haunted"	Jon Cassar	Erica Messer	September 30, 2009	502	14.24
94	3	"Reckoner"	Karen Gaviola	Dan Dworkin & Jay Beattie	October 7, 2009	503	14.05
95	4	"Hopeless"	Félix Alcalá	Chris Mundy	October 14, 2009	504	13.92
96	5	"Cradle to Grave"	Rob Spera	Breen Frazier	October 21, 2009	505	14.27
97	6	"The Eyes Have It"	Glenn Kershaw	Oanh Ly	November 4, 2009	506	12.55
98	7	"The Performer"	John Badham	Holly Harold	November 11, 2009	507	12.77
99	8	"Outfoxed"	John Gallagher	Simon Mirren	November 18, 2009	508	13.70
100	9	"100"	Edward Allen Bernero	Bo Crese (Note: 'Bo Crese' is a pseudonym used in the credits of "100". It is an acronym formed with the first letter of the name of every writer who contributed to the script: Breen Frazier, Oanh Ly, Chris Mundy, Rick Dunkle, Erica Messer, Simon Mirren and Edward Allen Bernero.)	November 25, 2009	509	13.61
101	10	"The Slave of Duty"	Charles Haid	Rick Dunkle	December 9, 2009	510	14.43
102	11	"Retaliation"	Félix Alcalá	Erica Messer	December 16, 2009	511	14.68
103	12	"The Uncanny Valley"	Anna J. Foerster	Breen Frazier	January 13, 2010	512	13.90
104	13	"Risky Business"	Rob Spera	Jim Clemente	January 20, 2010	513	14.91
105	14	"Parasite"	Charles S. Carroll	Oanh Ly	February 3, 2010	514	14.75
106	15	"Public Enemy"	Nelson McCormick	Jess Prenter Prosser	February 10, 2010	515	14.33
107	16	"Mosley Lane"	Matthew Gray Gubler	Simon Mirren & Erica Messer	March 3, 2010	516	13.00
108	17	"Solitary Man"	Rob Hardy	Kimberly Ann Harrison & Ryan Gibson	March 10, 2010	517	13.29
109	18	"The Fight"	Richard Shepard	Teleplay by : Chris Mundy; Story by : Chris Mundy & Edward Allen Bernero	April 7, 2010	518	12.70
110	19	"A Rite of Passage"	John Gallagher	Victor De Jesus	April 14, 2010	519	12.44
111	20	"…A Thousand Words"	Rosemary Rodriguez	Edward Allen Bernero	May 5, 2010	520	12.39
112	21	"Exit Wounds"	Charles S. Carroll	Rick Dunkle	May 12, 2010	521	13.07
113	22	"The Internet Is Forever"	Glenn Kershaw	Breen Frazier	May 19, 2010	522	13.25
114	23	"Our Darkest Hour"	Edward Allen Bernero	Erica Messer	May 26, 2010	523	12.97

=== Season 6 (2010–11) ===
No. overall	No. in season	Title	Directed by	Written by	Original release date	Prod. code	U.S. viewers (millions)
115	1	"The Longest Night"	Edward Allen Bernero	Edward Allen Bernero	September 22, 2010	601	14.13
116	2	"J.J."	Charles S. Carroll	Erica Messer	September 29, 2010	602	14.57
117	3	"Remembrance of Things Past"	Glenn Kershaw	Janine Sherman Barrois	October 6, 2010	604	13.87
118	4	"Compromising Positions"	Guy Norman Bee	Breen Frazier	October 13, 2010	603	14.00
119	5	"Safe Haven"	Andy Wolk	Alicia Kirk	October 20, 2010	605	14.46
120	6	"Devil's Night"	Charlie Haid	Randy Huggins	October 27, 2010	606	13.94
121	7	"Middle Man"	Rob Spera	Rick Dunkle	November 3, 2010	607	14.58
122	8	"Reflection of Desire"	Anna J. Foerster	Simon Mirren	November 10, 2010	608	12.56
123	9	"Into the Woods"	Glenn Kershaw	Kimberly Ann Harrison	November 17, 2010	609	14.39
124	10	"What Happens at Home"	Jan Eliasberg	Edward Allen Bernero	December 8, 2010	610	14.23
125	11	"25 to Life"	Charles S. Carroll	Erica Messer	December 15, 2010	611	13.77
126	12	"Corazón"	John Gallagher	Katarina Wittich	January 19, 2011	612	12.02
127	13	"The Thirteenth Step"	Doug Aarniokoski	Janine Sherman Barrois	January 26, 2011	613	12.77
128	14	"Sense Memory"	Rob Spera	Randy Huggins	February 9, 2011	614	13.67
129	15	"Today I Do"	Ali Selim	Alicia Kirk	February 16, 2011	615	12.85
130	16	"Coda"	Rob Hardy	Rick Dunkle	February 23, 2011	616	13.15
131	17	"Valhalla"	Charles S. Carroll	Simon Mirren & Erica Messer	March 2, 2011	617	14.37
132	18	"Lauren"	Matthew Gray Gubler	Breen Frazier	March 16, 2011	618	13.73
133	19	"With Friends Like These..."	Anna J. Foerster	Janine Sherman Barrois	March 30, 2011	619	13.05
134	20	"Hanley Waters"	Jesse Warn	Alicia Kirk & Randy Huggins	April 6, 2011	620	14.08
135	21	"The Stranger"	Nelson McCormick	Kimberly Ann Harrison & Rick Dunkle	April 13, 2011	621	13.59
136	22	"Out of the Light"	Doug Aarniokoski	Roger Hedden	May 4, 2011	622	12.90
137	23	"Big Sea"	Glenn Kershaw	Jim Clemente & Breen Frazier	May 11, 2011	623	13.29
138	24	"Supply and Demand"	Charles S. Carroll	Erica Messer	May 18, 2011	624	12.84

=== Season 7 (2011–12) ===
No. overall	No. in season	Title	Directed by	Written by	Original release date	Prod. code	U.S. viewers (millions)
139	1	"It Takes a Village"	Glenn Kershaw	Erica Messer	September 21, 2011	701	14.14
140	2	"Proof"	Karen Gaviola	Janine Sherman Barrois	September 28, 2011	702	12.58
141	3	"Dorado Falls"	Félix Alcalá	Sharon Lee Watson	October 5, 2011	703	13.43
142	4	"Painless"	Larry Teng	Breen Frazier	October 12, 2011	704	12.87
143	5	"From Childhood's Hour"	Anna J. Foerster	Bruce Zimmerman	October 19, 2011	705	13.15
144	6	"Epilogue"	Guy Ferland	Rick Dunkle	November 2, 2011	706	12.94
145	7	"There's No Place Like Home"	Rob Spera	Virgil Williams	November 9, 2011	707	11.36
146	8	"Hope"	Michael Watkins	Kimberly Ann Harrison	November 16, 2011	708	12.72
147	9	"Self-Fulfilling Prophecy"	Charlie Haid	Erica Messer	December 7, 2011	709	12.41
148	10	"The Bittersweet Science"	Rob Hardy	Janine Sherman Barrois	December 14, 2011	710	12.88
149	11	"True Genius"	Glenn Kershaw	Sharon Lee Watson	January 18, 2012	711	13.00
150	12	"Unknown Subject"	Michael Lange	Breen Frazier	January 25, 2012	712	13.82
151	13	"Snake Eyes"	Doug Aarniokoski	Bruce Zimmerman	February 8, 2012	713	13.31
152	14	"Closing Time"	Jesse Warn	Rick Dunkle	February 15, 2012	714	12.19
153	15	"A Thin Line"	Michael Watkins	Virgil Williams	February 22, 2012	715	12.78
154	16	"A Family Affair"	Rob Spera	Kimberly Ann Harrison	February 29, 2012	716	12.54
155	17	"I Love You, Tommy Brown"	John Terlesky	Janine Sherman Barrois	March 14, 2012	718	11.43
156	18	"Foundation"	Dermott Downs	Jim Clemente	March 21, 2012	717	12.09
157	19	"Heathridge Manor"	Matthew Gray Gubler	Sharon Lee Watson	April 4, 2012	719	11.34
158	20	"The Company"	Nelson McCormick	Breen Frazier	April 11, 2012	720	11.81
159	21	"Divining Rod"	Doug Aarniokoski	Bruce Zimmerman	May 2, 2012	721	11.47
160	22	"Profiling 101"	Félix Alcalá	Virgil Williams	May 9, 2012	722	11.62
161	23	"Hit"	Michael Lange	Rick Dunkle	May 16, 2012	723	13.68
162	24	"Run"	Glenn Kershaw	Erica Messer	May 16, 2012	724	13.68

=== Season 8 (2012–13) ===
No. overall	No. in season	Title	Directed by	Written by	Original release date	Prod. code	U.S. viewers (millions)
163	1	"The Silencer"	Glenn Kershaw	Erica Messer	September 26, 2012	801	11.73
164	2	"The Pact"	Karen Gaviola	Janine Sherman Barrois	October 10, 2012	802	11.49
165	3	"Through the Looking Glass"	Dermott Downs	Sharon Lee Watson	October 17, 2012	803	11.81
166	4	"God Complex"	Larry Teng	Breen Frazier	October 24, 2012	804	11.61
167	5	"The Good Earth"	John Terlesky	Bruce Zimmerman	October 31, 2012	805	11.99
168	6	"The Apprenticeship"	Rob Bailey	Virgil Williams	November 7, 2012	806	12.09
169	7	"The Fallen"	Doug Aarniokoski	Teleplay by : Rick Dunkle; Story by : Rick Dunkle & Danny Ramm	November 14, 2012	807	12.20
170	8	"The Wheels on the Bus"	Rob Hardy	Kimberly Ann Harrison	November 21, 2012	808	11.53
171	9	"Magnificent Light"	John T. Kretchmer	Sharon Lee Watson	November 28, 2012	809	12.37
172	10	"The Lesson"	Matthew Gray Gubler	Janine Sherman Barrois	December 5, 2012	810	11.33
173	11	"Perennials"	Michael Lange	Bruce Zimmerman	December 12, 2012	811	12.01
174	12	"Zugzwang"	Jesse Warn	Breen Frazier	January 16, 2013	812	12.64
175	13	"Magnum Opus"	Glenn Kershaw	Jason J. Bernero	January 23, 2013	813	11.84
176	14	"All That Remains"	Thomas Gibson	Erica Messer	February 6, 2013	815	11.98
177	15	"Broken"	Larry Teng	Rick Dunkle	February 20, 2013	814	10.69
178	16	"Carbon Copy"	Rob Hardy	Virgil Williams	February 27, 2013	816	10.33
179	17	"The Gathering"	Michael Lange	Kimberly Ann Harrison	March 20, 2013	817	11.58
180	18	"Restoration"	Félix Alcalá	Jim Clemente & Janine Sherman Barrois	April 3, 2013	818	10.79
181	19	"Pay It Forward"	John Terlesky	Bruce Zimmerman	April 10, 2013	819	11.47
182	20	"Alchemy"	Matthew Gray Gubler	Sharon Lee Watson	May 1, 2013	820	10.13
183	21	"Nanny Dearest"	Doug Aarniokoski	Virgil Williams	May 8, 2013	821	10.08
184	22	"#6"	Karen Gaviola	Breen Frazier	May 15, 2013	822	10.56
185	23	"Brothers Hotchner"	Rob Bailey	Rick Dunkle	May 22, 2013	823	11.01
186	24	"The Replicator"	Glenn Kershaw	Erica Messer	May 22, 2013	824	11.01

=== Season 9 (2013–14) ===
No. overall	No. in season	Title	Directed by	Written by	Original release date	Prod. code	U.S. viewers (millions)
187	1	"The Inspiration"	Glenn Kershaw	Janine Sherman Barrois	September 25, 2013	901	11.27
188	2	"The Inspired"	Larry Teng	Breen Frazier	October 2, 2013	902	11.12
189	3	"Final Shot"	Bethany Rooney	Sharon Lee Watson	October 9, 2013	904	10.98
190	4	"To Bear Witness"	Rob Bailey	Erica Messer	October 16, 2013	903	11.06
191	5	"Route 66"	Doug Aarniokoski	Virgil Williams	October 23, 2013	905	11.55
192	6	"In the Blood"	Michael Lange	Bruce Zimmerman	October 30, 2013	906	10.64
193	7	"Gatekeeper"	Matthew Gray Gubler	Rick Dunkle	November 6, 2013	907	9.70
194	8	"The Return"	John Terlesky	Kimberly Ann Harrison	November 13, 2013	908	11.63
195	9	"Strange Fruit"	Constantine Makris	Janine Sherman Barrois	November 20, 2013	909	12.40
196	10	"The Caller"	Rob Bailey	Sharon Lee Watson	November 27, 2013	910	11.10
197	11	"Bully"	Glenn Kershaw	Virgil Williams	December 11, 2013	911	11.19
198	12	"The Black Queen"	Tawnia McKiernan	Breen Frazier	January 15, 2014	912	10.35
199	13	"The Road Home"	Joe Mantegna	Bruce Zimmerman	January 22, 2014	913	10.35
200	14	"200"	Larry Teng	Rick Dunkle	February 5, 2014	914	12.92
201	15	"Mr. & Mrs. Anderson"	Félix Alcalá	Kimberly Ann Harrison	February 19, 2014	915	10.06
202	16	"Gabby"	Thomas Gibson	Jim Clemente & Erica Messer	February 26, 2014	916	9.42
203	17	"Persuasion"	Rob Lieberman	Sharon Lee Watson	March 5, 2014	917	11.42
204	18	"Rabid"	Doug Aarniokoski	Virgil Williams	March 12, 2014	918	10.74
205	19	"The Edge of Winter"	Hanelle Culpepper	Janine Sherman Barrois	March 19, 2014	919	10.14
206	20	"Blood Relations"	Matthew Gray Gubler	Breen Frazier	April 2, 2014	920	10.47
207	21	"What Happens in Mecklinburg"	Rob Hardy	Ticona S. Joy	April 9, 2014	921	9.85
208	22	"Fatal"	Larry Teng	Bruce Zimmerman	April 30, 2014	922	10.30
209	23	"Angels"	Rob Bailey	Rick Dunkle, Breen Frazier & Janine Sherman Barrois	May 7, 2014	923	10.52
210	24	"Demons"	Glenn Kershaw	Erica Messer	May 14, 2014	924	12.03

=== Season 10 (2014–15) ===
No. overall	No. in season	Title	Directed by	Written by	Original release date	Prod. code	U.S. viewers (millions)
211	1	"X"	Glenn Kershaw	Erica Messer	October 1, 2014	1001	11.74
212	2	"Burn"	Karen Gaviola	Janine Sherman Barrois	October 8, 2014	1002	10.57
213	3	"A Thousand Suns"	Rob Bailey	Sharon Lee Watson	October 15, 2014	1003	10.89
214	4	"The Itch"	Larry Teng	Breen Frazier	October 22, 2014	1004	9.92
215	5	"Boxed In"	Thomas Gibson	Virgil Williams	October 29, 2014	1006	10.48
216	6	"If the Shoe Fits"	Bethany Rooney	Bruce Zimmerman	November 5, 2014	1005	9.78
217	7	"Hashtag"	Constantine Makris	Rick Dunkle	November 12, 2014	1007	10.35
218	8	"The Boys of Sudworth Place"	Laura Belsey	Kimberly Ann Harrison	November 19, 2014	1008	10.68
219	9	"Fate"	Rob Bailey	Janine Sherman Barrois	November 26, 2014	1009	11.00
220	10	"Amelia Porter"	Alrick Riley	Sharon Lee Watson	December 10, 2014	1010	10.12
221	11	"The Forever People"	Tawnia McKiernan	Breen Frazier	January 14, 2015	1011	10.31
222	12	"Anonymous"	Joe Mantegna	Teleplay by : Bruce Zimmerman; Story by : Danny Ramm & Bruce Zimmerman	January 21, 2015	1012	10.29
223	13	"Nelson's Sparrow"	Glenn Kershaw	Kirsten Vangsness & Erica Messer	January 28, 2015	1013	10.70
224	14	"Hero Worship"	Larry Teng	Rick Dunkle	February 4, 2015	1014	10.48
225	15	"Scream"	Hanelle Culpepper	Kimberly Ann Harrison	February 11, 2015	1015	9.89
226	16	"Lockdown"	Thomas Gibson	Virgil Williams	March 4, 2015	1016	10.37
227	17	"Breath Play"	Hanelle Culpepper	Erik Stiller	March 11, 2015	1017	10.32
228	18	"Rock Creek Park"	Félix Alcalá	Sharon Lee Watson	March 25, 2015	1018	10.08
229	19	"Beyond Borders"	Glenn Kershaw	Erica Messer	April 8, 2015	1019	10.39
230	20	"A Place at the Table"	Laura Belsey	Bruce Zimmerman	April 15, 2015	1020	10.37
231	21	"Mr. Scratch"	Matthew Gray Gubler	Breen Frazier	April 22, 2015	1021	10.06
232	22	"Protection"	Tawnia McKiernan	Virgil Williams	April 29, 2015	1022	8.72
233	23	"The Hunt"	Glenn Kershaw	Jim Clemente & Janine Sherman Barrois	May 6, 2015	1023	9.61

=== Season 11 (2015–16) ===
No. overall	No. in season	Title	Directed by	Written by	Original release date	Prod. code	U.S. viewers (millions)
234	1	"The Job"	Glenn Kershaw	Breen Frazier	September 30, 2015	1101	10.08
235	2	"The Witness"	John Terlesky	Sharon Lee Watson	October 7, 2015	1102	9.08
236	3	"'Til Death Do Us Part"	Joe Mantegna	Karen Maser	October 14, 2015	1103	9.08
237	4	"Outlaw"	Larry Teng	Virgil Williams	October 21, 2015	1104	8.47
238	5	"The Night Watch"	Thomas Gibson	Bruce Zimmerman	October 28, 2015	1105	7.64
239	6	"Pariahville"	Félix Enríquez Alcalá	Erik Stiller	November 4, 2015	1106	7.79
240	7	"Target Rich"	Glenn Kershaw	Jim Clemente	November 11, 2015	1107	8.51
241	8	"Awake"	Christoph Schrewe	Kimberly Ann Harrison	November 18, 2015	1108	8.14
242	9	"Internal Affairs"	Diana C. Valentine	Sharon Lee Watson	December 2, 2015	1109	8.75
243	10	"Future Perfect"	Laura Belsey	Bruce Zimmerman	December 9, 2015	1110	9.27
244	11	"Entropy"	Heather Cappiello	Breen Frazier	January 13, 2016	1111	9.33
245	12	"Drive"	Tawnia McKiernan	Karen Maser	January 20, 2016	1112	9.25
246	13	"The Bond"	Hanelle M. Culpepper	Kimberly Ann Harrison	January 27, 2016	1113	9.22
247	14	"Hostage"	Bethany Rooney	Virgil Williams	February 10, 2016	1114	8.97
248	15	"A Badge and a Gun"	Rob Bailey	Jim Clemente	February 24, 2016	1115	8.64
249	16	"Derek"	Thomas Gibson	Breen Frazier	March 2, 2016	1116	9.32
250	17	"The Sandman"	Joe Mantegna	Bruce Zimmerman	March 16, 2016	1117	9.80
251	18	"A Beautiful Disaster"	Matthew Gray Gubler	Kirsten Vangsness & Erica Messer	March 23, 2016	1118	10.94
252	19	"Tribute"	Tawnia McKiernan	Virgil Williams	March 30, 2016	1119	9.17
253	20	"Inner Beauty"	Alec Smight	Haben Merker	April 13, 2016	1120	8.81
254	21	"Devil's Backbone"	Félix Enríquez Alcalá	Sharon Lee Watson	April 20, 2016	1121	9.14
255	22	"The Storm"	Glenn Kershaw	Erica Messer & Breen Frazier	May 4, 2016	1122	8.84

=== Season 12 (2016–17) ===
No. overall	No. in season	Title	Directed by	Written by	Original release date	Prod. code	U.S. viewers (millions)
256	1	"The Crimson King"	Glenn Kershaw	Breen Frazier	September 28, 2016	1201	8.92
257	2	"Sick Day"	Larry Teng	Virgil Williams	October 5, 2016	1202	7.62
258	3	"Taboo"	Alec Smight	Karen Maser	October 12, 2016	1203	8.40
259	4	"Keeper"	Sharat Raju	Bruce Zimmerman	October 26, 2016	1204	7.66
260	5	"The Anti-Terrorism Squad"	Tawnia McKiernan	Stephanie SenGupta	November 9, 2016	1205	7.37
261	6	"Elliott's Pond"	Matthew Gray Gubler	Erica Messer	November 16, 2016	1206	7.62
262	7	"Mirror Image"	Joe Mantegna	Breen Frazier	November 30, 2016	1207	7.44
263	8	"Scarecrow"	Christoph Schrewe	Karen Maser	December 7, 2016	1208	7.77
264	9	"Profiling 202"	Rob Bailey	Virgil Williams	January 4, 2017	1209	7.27
265	10	"Seek and Destroy"	Diana C. Valentine	Erik Stiller	January 11, 2017	1210	7.54
266	11	"Surface Tension"	Oz Scott	Bruce Zimmerman	February 1, 2017	1211	7.45
267	12	"A Good Husband"	Laura Belsey	Jim Clemente	February 8, 2017	1212	6.70
268	13	"Spencer"	Glenn Kershaw	Kirsten Vangsness & Erica Messer	February 15, 2017	1213	7.34
269	14	"Collision Course"	Alec Smight	Stephanie SenGupta	February 22, 2017	1214	7.33
270	15	"Alpha Male"	Rob Bailey	Karen Maser	March 1, 2017	1215	6.54
271	16	"Assistance Is Futile"	Leon Ichaso	Virgil Williams	March 15, 2017	1216	7.50
272	17	"In the Dark"	Diana C. Valentine	Dania Bennett	March 22, 2017	1217	7.46
273	18	"Hell's Kitchen"	Simon Mirren	Erica Messer	March 29, 2017	1218	6.88
274	19	"True North"	Joe Mantegna	Bruce Zimmerman	April 5, 2017	1219	7.04
275	20	"Unforgettable"	Carlos Bernard	Stephanie SenGupta	April 26, 2017	1220	6.91
276	21	"Green Light"	Alec Smight	Erik Stiller	May 3, 2017	1221	7.37
277	22	"Red Light"	Glenn Kershaw	Breen Frazier	May 10, 2017	1222	8.12

=== Season 13 (2017–18) ===
No. overall	No. in season	Title	Directed by	Written by	Original release date	Prod. code	U.S. viewers (millions)
278	1	"Wheels Up"	Glenn Kershaw	Breen Frazier	September 27, 2017	1301	7.00
279	2	"To a Better Place"	Diana C. Valentine	Bruce Zimmerman	October 4, 2017	1302	6.17
280	3	"Blue Angel"	Sharat Raju	Christopher Barbour	October 11, 2017	1304	5.87
281	4	"Killer App"	Alec Smight	Stephanie Sengupta	October 18, 2017	1303	5.94
282	5	"Lucky Strikes"	Tawnia McKiernan	Jim Clemente	October 25, 2017	1306	5.91
283	6	"The Bunker"	Aisha Tyler	Karen Maser	November 8, 2017	1305	5.50
284	7	"Dust and Bones"	Marcus Stokes	Erica Meredith	November 15, 2017	1307	5.64
285	8	"Neon Terror"	Bethany Rooney	Erik Stiller	November 22, 2017	1308	6.31
286	9	"False Flag"	Joe Mantegna	Breen Frazier	December 6, 2017	1309	5.34
287	10	"Submerged"	Rob Bailey	Bruce Zimmerman	January 3, 2018	1310	5.41
288	11	"Full-Tilt Boogie"	Simon Mirren	Erica Messer & Kirsten Vangsness	January 10, 2018	1311	5.70
289	12	"Bad Moon on the Rise"	Christoph Schrewe	Karen Maser	January 17, 2018	1312	5.63
290	13	"Cure"	Glenn Kershaw	Christopher Barbour	January 24, 2018	1313	5.30
291	14	"Miasma"	Leon Ichaso	Erica Meredith	January 31, 2018	1314	5.42
292	15	"Annihilator"	Rob Bailey	Erik Stiller	March 7, 2018	1315	5.04
293	16	"Last Gasp"	Adam Rodriguez	Stephanie Sengupta	March 14, 2018	1316	5.69
294	17	"The Capilanos"	Matthew Gray Gubler	Erica Messer	March 21, 2018	1317	5.26
295	18	"The Dance of Love"	Joe Mantegna	Bruce Zimmerman	March 28, 2018	1318	6.59
296	19	"Ex Parte"	Lily Mariye	Christopher Barbour	April 4, 2018	1319	5.90
297	20	"All You Can Eat"	Diana C. Valentine	Karen Maser	April 11, 2018	1320	5.20
298	21	"Mixed Signals"	Alec Smight	Erica Meredith & Erik Stiller	April 18, 2018	1321	5.92
299	22	"Believer"	Glenn Kershaw	Breen Frazier	April 18, 2018	1322	5.39

=== Season 14 (2018–19) ===
No. overall	No. in season	Title	Directed by	Written by	Original release date	Prod. code	U.S. viewers (millions)
300	1	"300"	Glenn Kershaw	Erica Messer	October 3, 2018	1401	4.45
301	2	"Starter Home"	Diana C. Valentine	Bruce Zimmerman	October 10, 2018	1402	4.65
302	3	"Rule 34"	Alec Smight	Christopher Barbour	October 17, 2018	1403	4.42
303	4	"Innocence"	Lily Mariye	Stephanie Sengupta	October 24, 2018	1405	4.29
304	5	"The Tall Man"	Matthew Gray Gubler	Breen Frazier	October 31, 2018	1404	4.41
305	6	"Luke"	Joe Mantegna	Erik Stiller	November 7, 2018	1406	4.56
306	7	"Twenty Seven"	Sharat Raju	Erica Meredith	November 14, 2018	1407	4.52
307	8	"Ashley"	Adam Rodriguez	Stephanie Birkitt	November 21, 2018	1408	5.50
308	9	"Broken Wing"	Aisha Tyler	Jim Clemente	December 5, 2018	1409	4.50
309	10	"Flesh and Blood"	Glenn Kershaw	Christopher Barbour	December 12, 2018	1410	5.43
310	11	"Night Lights"	Nelson McCormick	Heather Nöel Aldridge	January 2, 2019	1411	4.92
311	12	"Hamelin"	Simon Mirren	Bruce Zimmerman	January 9, 2019	1412	4.55
312	13	"Chameleon"	A. J. Cook	Charles Dewey & Breen Frazier	January 23, 2019	1413	4.45
313	14	"Sick and Evil"	Rob Bailey	Erik Stiller	January 30, 2019	1414	4.73
314	15	"Truth or Dare"	Glenn Kershaw	Erica Meredith	February 6, 2019	1415	4.72

=== Season 15 (2020) ===
No. overall	No. in season	Title	Directed by	Written by	Original release date	Prod. code	U.S. viewers (millions)
315	1	"Under the Skin"	Nelson McCormick	Christopher Barbour	January 8, 2020	1416	4.82
316	2	"Awakenings"	Alec Smight	Stephanie Sengupta	January 8, 2020	1417	4.49
317	3	"Spectator Slowing"	Kevin Berlandi	Bruce Zimmerman	January 15, 2020	1418	4.58
318	4	"Saturday"	Edward Allen Bernero	Stephanie Birkitt & Breen Frazier	January 22, 2020	1419	4.49
319	5	"Ghost"	Diana Valentine	Bobby Chacon & Jim Clemente	January 29, 2020	1421	5.88
320	6	"Date Night"	Marcus Stokes	Breen Frazier	February 5, 2020	1420	4.35
321	7	"Rusty"	Rachel Feldman	Erica Meredith & Erik Stiller	February 5, 2020	1422	3.74
322	8	"Family Tree"	Alec Smight	Bruce Zimmerman	February 12, 2020	1423	3.94
323	9	"Face Off"	Sharat Raju	Christopher Barbour	February 19, 2020	1424	5.46
324	10	"And in the End..."	Glenn Kershaw	Erica Messer & Kirsten Vangsness	February 19, 2020	1425	5.36

== Criminal Minds: Evolution episodes ==
=== Season 16 (2022–23) ===
No. overall	No. in season	Title	Directed by	Written by	Original release date
325	1	"Just Getting Started"	Nelson McCormick	Erica Messer	November 24, 2022
326	2	"Sicarius"	Nelson McCormick	Breen Frazier	November 24, 2022
327	3	"Moose"	Joe Mantegna	Matthew Lau	December 1, 2022
328	4	"Pay-Per-View"	Adam Rodriguez	Christopher Barbour	December 8, 2022
329	5	"Oedipus Wrecks"	Sharat Raju	Jayne A. Archer	December 15, 2022
330	6	"True Conviction"	Bethany Rooney	Chikodili Agwuna	January 12, 2023
331	7	"What Doesn't Kill Us"	Aisha Tyler	Sullivan Fitzgerald	January 19, 2023
332	8	"Forget Me Knots"	A. J. Cook	Carlton Gillespie	January 26, 2023
333	9	"Memento Mori"	Doug Aarniokoski	Breen Frazier	February 2, 2023
334	10	"Dead End"	Glenn Kershaw	Christopher Barbour	February 9, 2023

=== Season 17 (2024) ===
No. overall	No. in season	Title	Directed by	Written by	Original release date
335	1	"Gold Star"	Doug Aarniokoski	Erica Messer	June 6, 2024
336	2	"Contagion"	A. J. Cook	Matthew Lau	June 6, 2024
337	3	"Homesick"	Adam Rodriguez	Sullivan Fitzgerald & Carlton Gillespie	June 13, 2024
338	4	"Kingdom of the Blind"	Joe Mantegna	Chikodili Agwuna & Jayne A. Archer	June 20, 2024
339	5	"Conspiracy vs. Theory"	Sharat Raju	Breen Frazier	June 27, 2024
340	6	"Message in a Bottle"	Nelson McCormick	Carlton Gillespie & Sullivan Fitzgerald	July 4, 2024
341	7	"Piranha"	Aisha Tyler	Chikodili Agwuna & Jayne A. Archer	July 11, 2024
342	8	"North Star"	Zach Gilford	Charles Dewey & Christopher Barbour	July 18, 2024
343	9	"Stars & Stripes"	Bethany Rooney	Christopher Barbour	July 25, 2024
344	10	"Save the Children"	Glenn Kershaw	Breen Frazier	August 1, 2024

=== Season 18 (2025) ===
No. overall	No. in season	Title	Directed by	Written by	Original release date
345	1	"Swimmer's Calculus"	Bethany Rooney	Breen Frazier	May 8, 2025
346	2	"The Zookeeper"	Aisha Tyler	Christopher Barbour	May 15, 2025
347	3	"Time to Say Goodbye"	Joe Mantegna	Erica Messer	May 22, 2025
348	4	"I'm Fine, It's Fine. Everything Is Fine"	Anthony Vietro	Jayne A. Archer	May 29, 2025
349	5	"The Brutal Man"	Nelson McCormick	Sullivan Fitzgerald	June 5, 2025
350	6	"Hell Is Empty..."	Jackeline Tejada	Charles Dewey	June 12, 2025
351	7	"...All the Devils Are Here"	A. J. Cook	Carlton William Gillespie	June 19, 2025
352	8	"Tara"	Sharat Raju	Chikodili Agwuna	June 26, 2025
353	9	"Col1ateRal"	Doug Aarniokoski	Breen Frazier	July 3, 2025
354	10	"The Disciple"	Glenn Kershaw	Christopher Barbour	July 10, 2025

=== Season 19 (2026) ===
No. overall	No. in season	Title	Directed by	Written by	Original release date
355	1	"Now and Then"	Doug Aarniokoski	Erica Messer	May 28, 2026
356	2	"Cluster"	Anthony Vietro	Breen Frazier	May 28, 2026
357	3	"Body Count"	Jackeline Tejada	Christopher Barbour	June 4, 2026
358	4	"The Witching Hour"	Adam Rodriguez	Carlton William Gillespie	June 11, 2026
359	5	"Friendly Fire"	Nelson McCormick	Sullivan Fitzgerald	June 18, 2026
360	6	"Proxy"	Sharat Raju	Chikodili Agwuna	June 25, 2026
361	7	"The Furies"	Zach Gilford	Jayne A. Archer	July 2, 2026
362	8	"Requiem"	James Takata	Charles Dewey	July 9, 2026
363	9	"Special Agent Garrity"	Bethany Rooney	Ryan McGonnigal & Breen Frazier	July 16, 2026
364	10	"Bad Blood"	Glenn Kershaw	Christopher Barbour	July 23, 2026

== Home video releases ==
Season	Episodes	DVD release dates		
Season	Episodes	Region 1	Region 2	Region 4
1	22	November 28, 2006	February 12, 2007	November 3, 2007
2	23	October 2, 2007	May 5, 2008	April 1, 2008
3	20	September 16, 2008	April 6, 2009	March 18, 2009
4	26	September 8, 2009	March 1, 2010	March 9, 2010
5	23	September 7, 2010	February 28, 2011	March 2, 2011
6	24	September 6, 2011	November 28, 2011	November 30, 2011
7	24	September 4, 2012	November 26, 2012	November 7, 2012
8	24	September 3, 2013	December 9, 2013	December 4, 2013
9	24	August 26, 2014	December 8, 2014	December 3, 2014
10	23	August 25, 2015	December 7, 2015	December 2, 2015
11	22	August 30, 2016	December 5, 2016	December 7, 2016
12	22	September 5, 2017	December 4, 2017	December 6, 2017
13	22	August 28, 2018	December 3, 2018	December 12, 2018
14	15	July 16, 2019	October 21, 2019	November 13, 2019
15	10	April 14, 2020	November 30, 2020	November 25, 2020
16	10	June 20, 2023	TBA	TBA
17	10	November 12, 2024	TBA	TBA
