= Criminal Minds season 12 =

Season of television series Criminal Minds

Criminal Minds
- Season 12
- Season 12 U.S. DVD cover
- Starring: Joe Mantegna; Matthew Gray Gubler; A. J. Cook; Kirsten Vangsness; Damon Gupton; Aisha Tyler; Adam Rodriguez; Thomas Gibson; Paget Brewster
- No. of episodes: 22

Release
- Original network: CBS
- Original release: September 28, 2016 – May 10, 2017

Season chronology
- ← Previous; Season 11 Next → Season 13

The twelfth season of Criminal Minds was ordered on May 6, 2016, by CBS with an order of 22 episodes. The season premiered on September 28, 2016, and ended on May 10, 2017.

== Cast ==
=== Main ===
- Joe Mantegna as Supervisory Special Agent David Rossi (BAU Senior Agent)
- Matthew Gray Gubler as Supervisory Special Agent Dr. Spencer Reid (BAU Agent)
- A. J. Cook as Supervisory Special Agent Jennifer "JJ" Jareau (BAU Agent)
- Kirsten Vangsness as Special Agent Penelope Garcia (BAU Technical Analyst & Co-Communications Liaison)
- Damon Gupton as Supervisory Special Agent Stephen Walker (BAU Agent)
- Aisha Tyler as Supervisory Special Agent Dr. Tara Lewis (BAU Agent)
- Adam Rodriguez as Supervisory Special Agent Luke Alvez (FBI Fugitive Task Force & BAU Agent)
- Thomas Gibson as Supervisory Special Agent Aaron Hotchner (BAU Unit Chief & Co-Communications Liaison) (Ep. 1–2)
- Paget Brewster as Supervisory Special Agent Emily Prentiss (BAU Unit Chief & Co-Communications Liaison) (Ep. 3–22)

=== Special guest star ===
- Jane Lynch as Diana Reid
- Alana de la Garza as Clara Seger
- Daniel Henney as Supervisory Special Agent Matt Simmons (BAU Agent)
- Shemar Moore as Derek Morgan

=== Recurring ===
- Bodhi Elfman as Peter Lewis / Mr. Scratch
- Angela Robinson Witherspoon as Cassie Campbell
- Jeananne Goossen as Fiona Duncan
- Harold Perrineau as Calvin Shaw
- Richard T. Jones as Officer Lionel Wilkins
- Gia Mantegna as Lindsey Vaughn
- Aubrey Plaza as Cat Adams
- Josh Stewart as William "Will" LaMontagne Jr.
- Mekhai Andersen as Henry LaMontagne

=== Guest ===
- Sherilyn Fenn as Gloria Barker
- Pooch Hall as FBI Trainee Clark
- Tatum O'Neal as Miranda White
- David Otunga as Dwayne Jerrard
- Beth Riesgraf as Maeve Donovan
- Tracie Thoms as Monica Walker

== Production ==
=== Development ===
Criminal Minds was renewed for a twelfth season with an episode order of 22 episodes on May 6, 2016. The season began on September 28, 2016. The entire main cast returned for the season, except Shemar Moore (Derek Morgan), who left the show during the eleventh season.

=== Casting ===
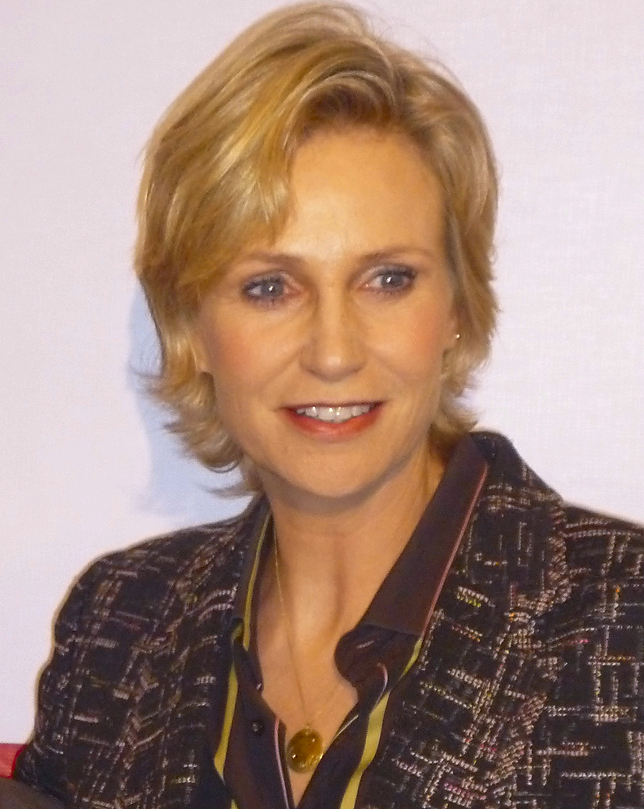
Jane Lynch returned in Season 12 as Diana Reid.

After Shemar Moore's departure in the previous season, former CSI: Miami star Adam Rodriguez was cast to fill his void in the twelfth season. He played Luke Alvez, a new recruit to the BAU from the FBI's Fugitive Task Force, tasked with helping to capture an escaped killer from last season. On July 21, Kirsten Vangsness confirmed that Paget Brewster would reprise her role as SSA Emily Prentiss for multiple episodes. On August 10, 2016, Aisha Tyler, who joined the show in the previous season as Dr. Tara Lewis, was promoted to a series regular.

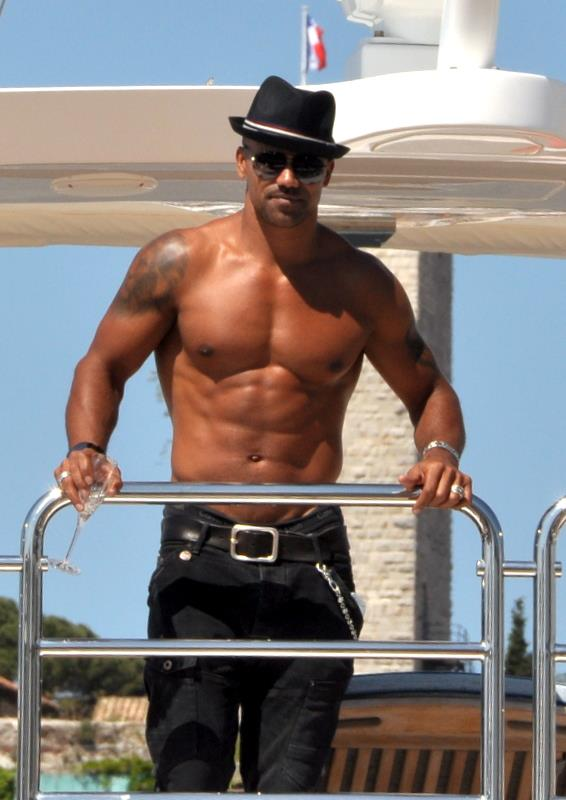
Shemar Moore reprised his role as Derek Morgan in the season finale.

On August 30, 2016, Brewster was promoted to series regular, following Thomas Gibson's firing. Jane Lynch reprised her role as Dr. Diana Reid, Spencer Reid's schizophrenic mother after eight years. She appeared in the second half of the season in a multi-episode arc.

To fill the void after Gibson's firing, Damon Gupton was cast in the series regular role of Special Agent Stephen Walker, a profiler from the Behavioral Analysis Program in the FBI. He made his first appearance in the eighth episode.

Shemar Moore reprised his role as Derek Morgan in the season finale as his character tried to help catch Mr. Scratch after bringing the BAU a lead in the case against him.

During April 2017, it was revealed that Gia Mantegna would reprise her role as Lindsay Vaughn in the final 3 episodes of the season. It was also revealed that Beth Riesgraf would reprise her role as Maeve Donovan in the season finale.

==== Gibson's suspension and exit ====
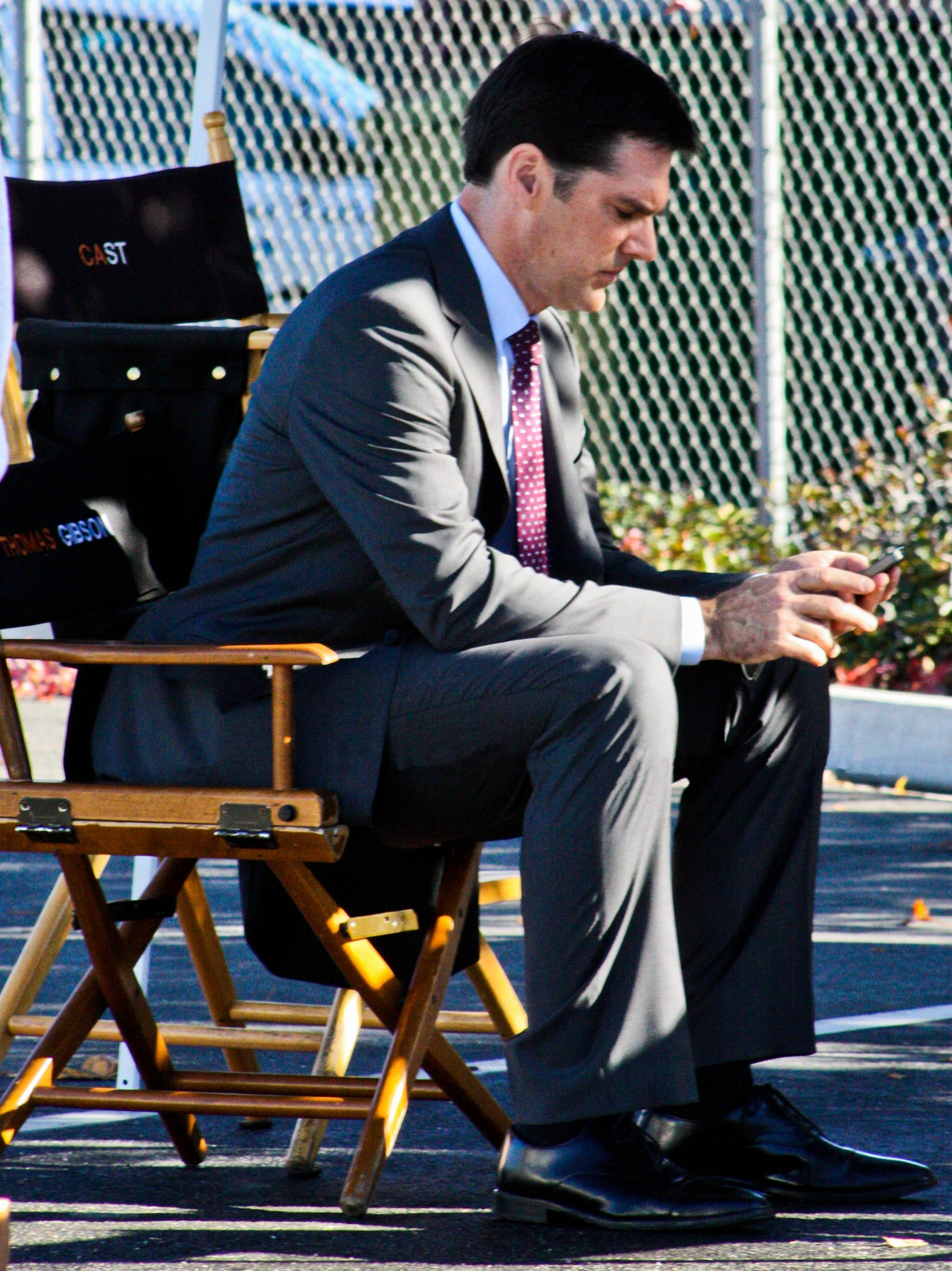
Producers denied rumors that Aaron Hotchner's written out was because of Thomas Gibson's behavior during an on-set altercation.

On August 11, 2016, Deadline reported that Thomas Gibson had been suspended and therefore written out from two episodes due to an on-set altercation with one of the producers. He was also cut from directing one of the episodes. The following day, Gibson was fired following the on-set altercation. A joint statement from ABC Studios and CBS Television Studios read, "Thomas Gibson has been dismissed from Criminal Minds."

Gibson's character's exit was explained in the sixth episode of the season, "Elliot's Pond", when it was revealed that his character retired and went into witness protection because of Mr. Scratch stalking his son. Gibson would not appear in episode three to twenty-two. Paget Brewster was hired to replace him in the following episode as Emily Prentiss.

== Episodes ==
No. overall	No. in season	Title	Directed by	Written by	Original release date	Prod. code	U.S. viewers (millions)
256	1	"The Crimson King"	Glenn Kershaw	Breen Frazier	September 28, 2016	1201	8.92
When a Tempe, Arizona man is found wandering the Sonoran Desert with the initials "BAU" carved into his stomach and the crime is connected to an injustice collector who recently escaped from prison with 12 other criminals, the team works with new member Luke Alvez (Adam Rodriguez) to track down the killer, only to find themselves facing a criminal (Bodhi Elfman) they previously put away over a year earlier.
257	2	"Sick Day"	Larry Teng	Virgil Williams	October 5, 2016	1202	7.62
After concluding a case in Los Angeles, California, JJ breaks down in front of Will and recounts the events surrounding the BAU's attempt to apprehend a serial arsonist responsible for abducting four children and burning them alive over the course of two years.
258	3	"Taboo"	Alec Smight	Karen Maser	October 12, 2016	1203	8.40
With Hotch on TDY, Lewis on assignment, and former SSA Emily Prentiss (Paget Brewster) filling in for them, the BAU travels to Boynton Beach, Florida to investigate the murders of two single mothers who were drowned in drums of concrete.
259	4	"Keeper"	Sharat Raju	Bruce Zimmerman	October 26, 2016	1204	7.66
When a Virginia state trooper discovers a bag of dismembered body parts in a homeless man's campsite, the BAU searches the Appalachian Trail for a serial killer with a bizarre motive. Meanwhile, Reid is faced with a dilemma after his mother is selected to participate in an upcoming study on Alzheimer's disease.
260	5	"The Anti-Terrorism Squad"	Tawnia McKiernan	Stephanie SenGupta	November 9, 2016	1205	7.37
When a teenage Winona, Minnesota girl reports that her parents and younger brother were gunned down in their sleep, the BAU sets out to determine whether she was involved in the murders or deliberately spared. Meanwhile, Garcia attempts to find the perfect gift for Alvez's dog.
261	6	"Elliott's Pond"	Matthew Gray Gubler	Erica Messer	November 16, 2016	1206	7.62
When three teenage Clayton, Delaware boys are reported missing and their last known location is revealed to be the same area where twin siblings disappeared 33 years earlier, the BAU sets out to establish a connection between the two cases. Meanwhile, the team receives a shocking update on Hotch's absence that leaves Prentiss contemplating accepting a special request.
262	7	"Mirror Image"	Joe Mantegna	Breen Frazier	November 30, 2016	1207	7.44
When Lewis encounters a complete stranger claiming to be her estranged younger brother, Gabriel, the BAU brings the man in for questioning and attempts to uncover his true identity only to find themselves playing a high-stakes cat-and-mouse game against serial killer Peter Lewis.
263	8	"Scarecrow"	Christoph Schrewe	Karen Maser	December 7, 2016	1208	7.77
When Yakima, Washington authorities receive multiple 911 calls about a woman screaming for help before being abducted and two sets of female remains are later discovered in a creek bed, the BAU searches for a serial killer driven by a twisted sense of morality. Meanwhile, Reid receives an upsetting phone call from his mother and the team welcomes profiler Stephen Walker (Damon Gupton) into the fold.
264	9	"Profiling 202"	Rob Bailey	Virgil Williams	January 4, 2017	1209	7.27
When Rossi receives a chilling birthday phone call from prolific serial killer Thomas Yates, who is listed as one of the remaining escapees from the mass prison break, and a woman is subsequently found dead in Virginia's George Washington and Jefferson National Forests, the BAU works with a team of up-and-coming FBI profilers to stop Yates from embarking on another spree.
265	10	"Seek and Destroy"	Diana C. Valentine	Erik Stiller	January 11, 2017	1210	7.54
When three wealthy San Diego, California residents are gunned down while their homes are robbed and vandalized, the BAU suspects the crimes were committed by a gang of thrill-seekers.
266	11	"Surface Tension"	Oz Scott	Bruce Zimmerman	February 1, 2017	1211	7.45
When authorities from Tampa, Florida discover a mysterious symbol on the bodies of two residents who previously committed suicide, the BAU sets out to apprehend a killer who believes his crimes to be religious sacrifices. Meanwhile, Reid helps his mother adapt to new surroundings after choosing to take her out of the clinical study.
267	12	"A Good Husband"	Laura Belsey	Jim Clemente	February 8, 2017	1212	6.70
When two dismembered male torsos are discovered in Palm Springs, California, the BAU juggles identifying both victims and establishing a connection. Meanwhile, Reid juggles returning to work and caring for his mother.
268	13	"Spencer"	Glenn Kershaw	Kirsten Vangsness & Erica Messer	February 15, 2017	1213	7.34
When Reid is arrested and charged with drug possession by Mexican authorities, the BAU works with International Response Team members Clara Seger (Alana de la Garza) and Matt Simmons (Daniel Henney) to prove his innocence in the death of a Mexican-American doctor.
269	14	"Collision Course"	Alec Smight	Stephanie SenGupta	February 22, 2017	1214	7.33
When drivers and pedestrians from Bradenton, Florida are critically injured in a series of car accidents, the BAU suspects the accidents were engineered by a hacker. Meanwhile, Prentiss and defense attorney Fiona Duncan (Jeananne Goossen) juggle preventing Reid from being indicted and sorting through a mountain of incriminating evidence.
270	15	"Alpha Male"	Rob Bailey	Karen Maser	March 1, 2017	1215	6.54
When four Philadelphia civilians are disfigured in planned attacks, the BAU sets out to catch a budding serial killer who wants to make his victims feel as ugly as he does. Meanwhile, Reid is sent to the general population by a guard with a grudge and makes a friend in former federal agent Calvin Shaw (Harold Perrineau).
271	16	"Assistance Is Futile"	Leon Ichaso	Virgil Williams	March 15, 2017	1216	7.50
When three New York City women are tortured to death and found with their bones crushed, the BAU works with a single mother (Tatum O'Neal) who claims her son is behind the heinous crimes. Meanwhile, Reid faces a difficult decision after a fellow inmate is threatened.
272	17	"In the Dark"	Diana C. Valentine	Dania Bennett	March 22, 2017	1217	7.46
When two radically different killing sprees take place in Burlington, Vermont, the BAU sets out to determine if two different serial killers are working in concert or if a lone serial killer is behind both sprees. Meanwhile, Alvez presents Shaw with an ultimatum after Reid is assaulted.
273	18	"Hell's Kitchen"	Simon Mirren	Erica Messer	March 29, 2017	1218	6.88
The BAU returns to New York City to identify a killer with an unquenchable thirst after a sixteen-year-old girl disappears from the Hell's Kitchen neighborhood and the investigation is connected to two cold cases. Meanwhile, Reid makes a bold decision that threatens to place his well-being in jeopardy.
274	19	"True North"	Joe Mantegna	Bruce Zimmerman	April 5, 2017	1219	7.04
When three decomposing bodies are found tied to wooden stakes outside Tucson, Arizona, the BAU determines the victims are pawns in a sinister vendetta. Meanwhile, Lewis convinces Reid to undergo a cognitive interview.
275	20	"Unforgettable"	Carlos Bernard	Stephanie SenGupta	April 26, 2017	1220	6.91
When one of Walker's former colleagues is hospitalized after being injected with a radioactive toxin, the BAU suspects the incident is connected to the deaths of several government employees. Meanwhile, Reid receives an unexpected visit in the form of his mother and a ghost from his past.
276	21	"Green Light"	Alec Smight	Erik Stiller	May 3, 2017	1221	7.37
When Prentiss discovers that Reid's mother has been abducted by former victim Lindsey Vaughn (Gia Mantegna), the BAU sets out to rescue her only to question everything they thought they knew when the person responsible for framing him is unmasked.
277	22	"Red Light"	Glenn Kershaw	Breen Frazier	May 10, 2017	1222	8.12
As the BAU continues searching for Reid's mother, Reid finds himself forced to participate in a high-stakes game of wits with hitwoman Cat Adams (Aubrey Plaza). Meanwhile, former SSA Derek Morgan (Shemar Moore) provides the team with a possible lead on Peter Lewis.

== Ratings ==
=== Live + SD ratings ===
No. in series	No. in season	Episode	Air date	Time slot (EST)	Rating/Share (18–49)	Viewers (m)	18–49 Rank	Viewership rank	Drama rank
256	1	"The Crimson King"	September 28, 2016	Wednesday; 9:00 P.M.	1.9/6	8.92	22	23	7
257	2	"Sick Day"	October 5, 2016	Wednesday; 9:00 P.M.	1.4/5	7.62	—N/a	22	—N/a
258	3	"Taboo"	October 12, 2016	Wednesday; 9:00 P.M.	1.7/6	8.40	25	21	7
259	4	"Keeper"	October 26, 2016	Wednesday; 9:00 P.M.	1.6/6	7.66	30	—N/a	7
260	5	"The Anti-Terror Squad"	November 9, 2016	Wednesday; 9:00 P.M.	1.3/4	7.37	—N/a	21	—N/a
261	6	"Elliott's Pond"	November 16, 2016	Wednesday; 9:00 P.M.	1.4/5	7.62	—N/a	25	—N/a
262	7	"Mirror Image"	November 30, 2016	Wednesday; 9:00 P.M.	1.4/5	7.44	—N/a	20	—N/a
263	8	"Scarecrow"	December 7, 2016	Wednesday; 9:00 P.M.	1.3/5	7.77	—N/a	20	—N/a
264	9	"Profiling 202"	January 4, 2017	Wednesday; 9:00 P.M.	1.4/5	7.27	—N/a	22	—N/a
265	10	"Seek and Destroy"	January 11, 2017	Wednesday; 9:00 P.M.	1.4/5	7.54	21	13	10
266	11	"Surface Tension"	February 1, 2017	Wednesday; 9:00 P.M.	1.3/5	7.45	11	10	7
267	12	"A Good Husband"	February 8, 2017	Wednesday; 9:00 P.M.	1.2/4	6.70	—N/a	23	—N/a
268	13	"Spencer"	February 15, 2017	Wednesday; 9:00 P.M.	1.3/5	7.34	26	15	12
269	14	"Collision Course"	February 22, 2017	Wednesday; 9:00 P.M.	1.3/5	7.33	29	15	8
270	15	"Alpha Male"	March 1, 2017	Wednesday; 9:00 P.M.	1.3/5	6.54	20	—N/a	4
271	16	"Assistance is Futile"	March 15, 2017	Wednesday; 9:00 P.M.	1.3/5	7.50	27	15	9
272	17	"In The Dark"	March 22, 2017	Wednesday; 9:00 P.M.	1.3/5	7.46	17	13	10
273	18	"Hell's Kitchen"	March 29, 2017	Wednesday; 9:00 P.M.	1.2/5	6.88	23	19	11
274	19	"True North"	April 5, 2017	Wednesday; 9:00 P.M.	1.3/5	7.04	24	19	10
275	20	"Unforgettable"	April 26, 2017	Wednesday; 9:00 P.M.	1.3/5	6.91	13	16	4
276	21	"Green Light"	May 3, 2017	Wednesday; 9:00 P.M.	1.5/5	7.37	13	17	6
277	22	"Red Light"	May 10, 2017	Wednesday; 9:00 P.M.	1.6/6	8.12	9	14	4

=== Live + 7 Day (DVR) ratings ===
No. in series	No. in season	Episode	Air date	Time slot (EST)	18–49 rating increase	Viewers (millions) increase	Total 18–49	Total viewers (millions)	Ref
256	1	"The Crimson King"	September 28, 2016	Wednesday; 9:00 P.M.	1.1	3.83	3.0	12.41	
257	2	"Sick Day"	October 5, 2016	Wednesday; 9:00 P.M.	1.1	3.76	2.5	11.32	
258	3	"Taboo"	October 12, 2016	Wednesday; 9:00 P.M.	1.1	3.41	2.8	11.81	
259	4	"Keeper"	October 26, 2016	Wednesday; 9:00 P.M.	1.1	3.81	2.7	11.48	
260	5	"The Anti-Terror Squad"	November 9, 2016	Wednesday; 9:00 P.M.	0.7	2.38	2.0	9.76	
261	6	"Elliott's Pond"	November 16, 2016	Wednesday; 9:00 P.M.	1.1	3.57	2.5	11.20	
262	7	"Mirror Image"	November 30, 2016	Wednesday; 9:00 P.M.	1.1	3.71	2.5	11.15	
263	8	"Scarecrow"	December 7, 2016	Wednesday; 9:00 P.M.	1.2	3.67	2.5	11.44	
264	9	"Profiling 202"	January 4, 2017	Wednesday; 9:00 P.M.	1.1	3.84	2.5	11.11	
265	10	"Seek and Destroy"	January 11, 2017	Wednesday; 9:00 P.M.	1.1	3.43	2.5	10.97	
266	11	"Surface Tension"	February 1, 2017	Wednesday; 9:00 P.M.	1.0	3.49	2.3	10.94	
267	12	"A Good Husband"	February 8, 2017	Wednesday; 9:00 P.M.	0.9	3.42	2.1	10.12	
268	13	"Spencer"	February 15, 2017	Wednesday; 9:00 P.M.	0.9	3.43	2.2	10.78	
269	14	"Collision Course"	February 22, 2017	Wednesday; 9:00 P.M.	0.9	3.34	2.2	10.67	
270	15	"Alpha Male"	March 1, 2017	Wednesday; 9:00 P.M.	0.7	2.93	2.0	9.54	^{1}
271	16	"Assistance is Futile"	March 15, 2017	Wednesday; 9:00 P.M.	1.0	3.38	2.3	10.90	
272	17	"In The Dark"	March 22, 2017	Wednesday; 9:00 P.M.	1.1	3.40	2.4	10.86	
273	18	"Hell's Kitchen"	March 29, 2017	Wednesday; 9:00 P.M.	1.0	3.26	2.2	10.16	
274	19	"True North"	April 5, 2017	Wednesday; 9:00 P.M.	0.9	3.11	2.2	10.15	
275	20	"Unforgettable"	April 26, 2017	Wednesday; 9:00 P.M.	0.7	2.42	2.0	9.33	^{1}
276	21	"Green Light"	May 3, 2017	Wednesday; 9:00 P.M.	0.9	3.30	2.4	10.51	
277	22	"Red Light"	May 10, 2017	Wednesday; 9:00 P.M.	0.9	3.20	2.5	11.31	

^1 Live +7 ratings were not available, so Live +3 ratings have been used instead.

== Home media ==
The Complete Twelfth Season
Set details		Special features
22 episodes; 6-disc set (Region 1); 5-disc set (Region 2 & 4); Aspect Ratio: 1.78:1; Subtitles: English; English: Dolby Digital 5.1		The Family Unit; Director's Chair; Victimology; The Prisoner; 4th Life; Gag Reel; Deleted Scenes
DVD release date
Region 1	Region 2	Region 4
September 5, 2017	December 4, 2017	TBA
