= Criminal Minds season 11 =

Season of television series Criminal Minds

Criminal Minds
- Season 11
- Season 11 U.S. DVD cover
- Starring: Joe Mantegna; Shemar Moore; Matthew Gray Gubler; A. J. Cook; Kirsten Vangsness; Thomas Gibson; Aisha Tyler
- No. of episodes: 22

Release
- Original network: CBS
- Original release: September 30, 2015 – May 4, 2016

Season chronology
- ← Previous; Season 10 Next → Season 12

The eleventh season of Criminal Minds was ordered on May 11, 2015 by CBS. It premiered on September 30, 2015 on CBS and ended on May 4, 2016. The season consisted of 22 episodes.

== Cast ==
The entire main cast returned for the season, except Jennifer Love Hewitt (Kate Callahan), who left the show in the season ten finale. On June 22, 2015, it was announced that Aisha Tyler (coincidentally Hewitt's co-star during Season 1 of Ghost Whisperer) would replace Hewitt in a recurring role as Dr. Tara Lewis, a psychologist with an eye on forensic psychology and its application toward the criminal justice system.

=== Main ===
- Joe Mantegna as Supervisory Special Agent David Rossi (BAU Senior Agent)
- Shemar Moore as Supervisory Special Agent Derek Morgan (BAU Agent) (Ep. 1–18)
- Matthew Gray Gubler as Supervisory Special Agent Dr. Spencer Reid (BAU Agent)
- A. J. Cook as Supervisory Special Agent Jennifer "JJ" Jareau (BAU Agent)
- Kirsten Vangsness as Special Agent Penelope Garcia (BAU Technical Analyst & Co-Communications Liaison)
- Thomas Gibson as Supervisory Special Agent Aaron Hotchner (BAU Unit Chief & Co-Communications Liaison)

=== Also starring ===
- Aisha Tyler as Tara Lewis

=== Special guest star ===
- Paget Brewster as Agent Emily Prentiss (Chief of Interpol-London Office) (Episode 19)

=== Recurring ===
- Rochelle Aytes as Savannah Hayes
- Amber Stevens as Joy Struthers
- Cade Owens as Jack Hotchner
- Josh Stewart as William "Will" LaMontagne Jr.
- Mekhai Andersen as Henry LaMontagne
- Phoenix Andersen as Michael LaMontagne
- Marisol Nichols as Agent Natalie Colfax
- Frances Fisher as Antonia Slade
- Sheryl Lee Ralph as Hayden Montgomery
- Bodhi Elfman as Peter Lewis / Mr. Scratch
- Aubrey Plaza as Cat Adams

== Production ==
Jennifer Love Hewitt left the show because of her pregnancy, and her character Kate Callahan handed in her resignation at the end of the season ten finale, due to her pregnancy and decision to devote the next year to her baby. It was announced that Aisha Tyler would replace Hewitt in a recurring role as Dr. Tara Lewis. A.J. Cook revealed herself to be pregnant, and it was later revealed in the tenth-season finale that her character Jennifer "JJ" Jareau was also pregnant. She did not appear in the first six episodes (except the season premiere). Showrunner Erica Messer expressed her desire about bringing back old characters from previous seasons, including Spencer Reid's mother played by Jane Lynch. Cook appeared in the first episode "The Job" holding her sleeping baby Michael, played by Phoenix Andersen, her child in real life.

Matthew Gray Gubler directed episode 18, "A Beautiful Disaster", in which Shemar Moore left the main cast (Moore went on to star as Hondo Harrelson in the CBS remake of SWAT). On February 10, 2016, it was announced that Paget Brewster would return as Emily Prentiss for one episode later in season 11 episode 19, titled "Tribute". The season ended on May 4, 2016, with the show's first cliffhanger finale since the fifth season. Messer said she felt it was time for another cliffhanger and thought that it served as a "really fun launch pad" into the twelfth season, which was officially ordered two days later.

=== Guest stars ===
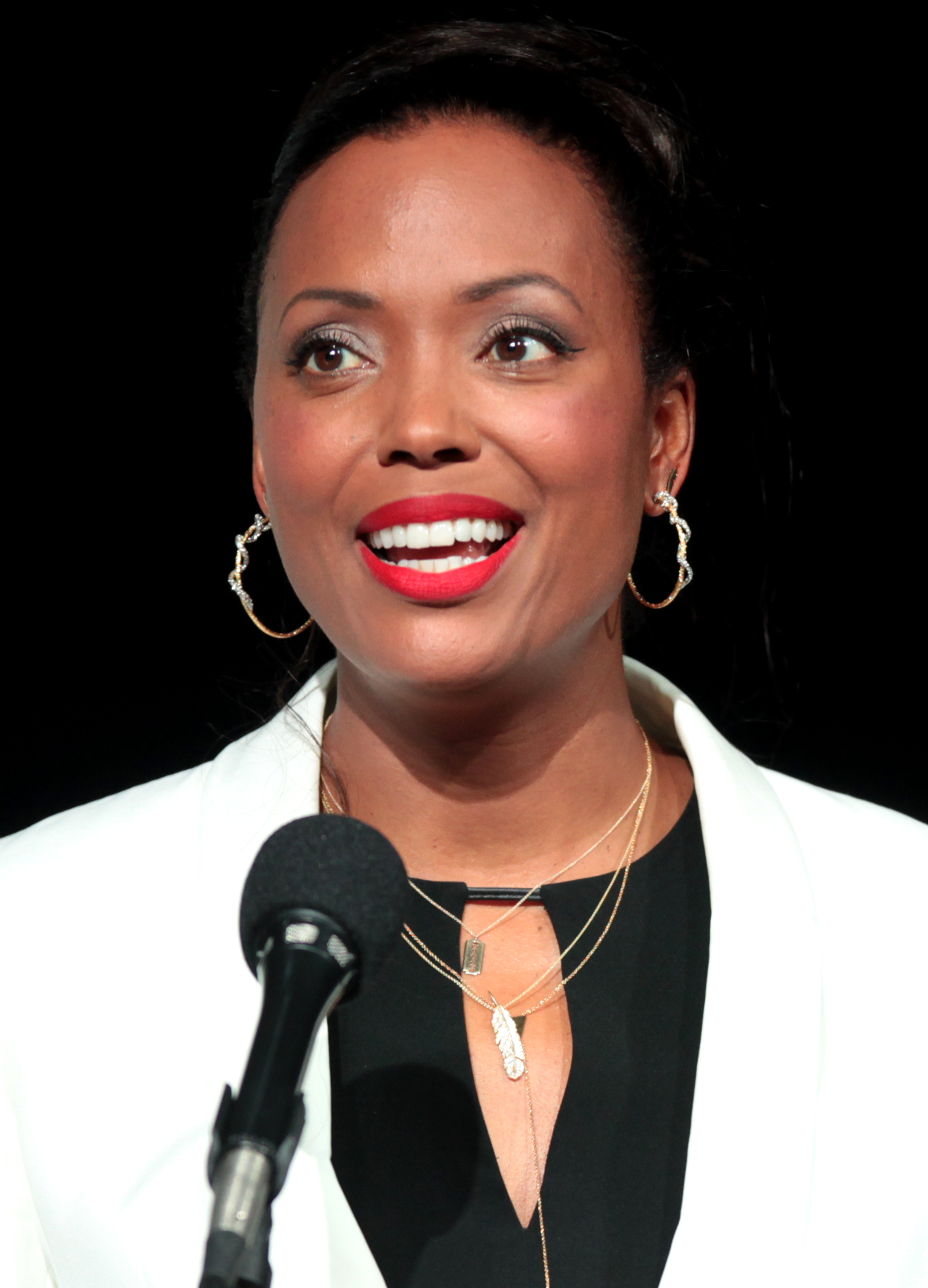
Aisha Tyler played a recurring role as Dr. Tara Lewis.

A. J. Cook announced her pregnancy, a fact that was carried over to her character Jennifer "JJ" Jareau as well. Showrunner Erica Messer stated in an interview that Cook's character JJ would not appear for the first five episodes of the season as Cook was on maternity leave. Messer continued talking about a guest star to replace Cook during her absence from the show as she said, "My hope is we could have a fun guest star when A.J.'s on maternity leave. It will be different because JJ won't be there. There is no replacing her as we know, but there's an opportunity there to have fun for a few episodes."

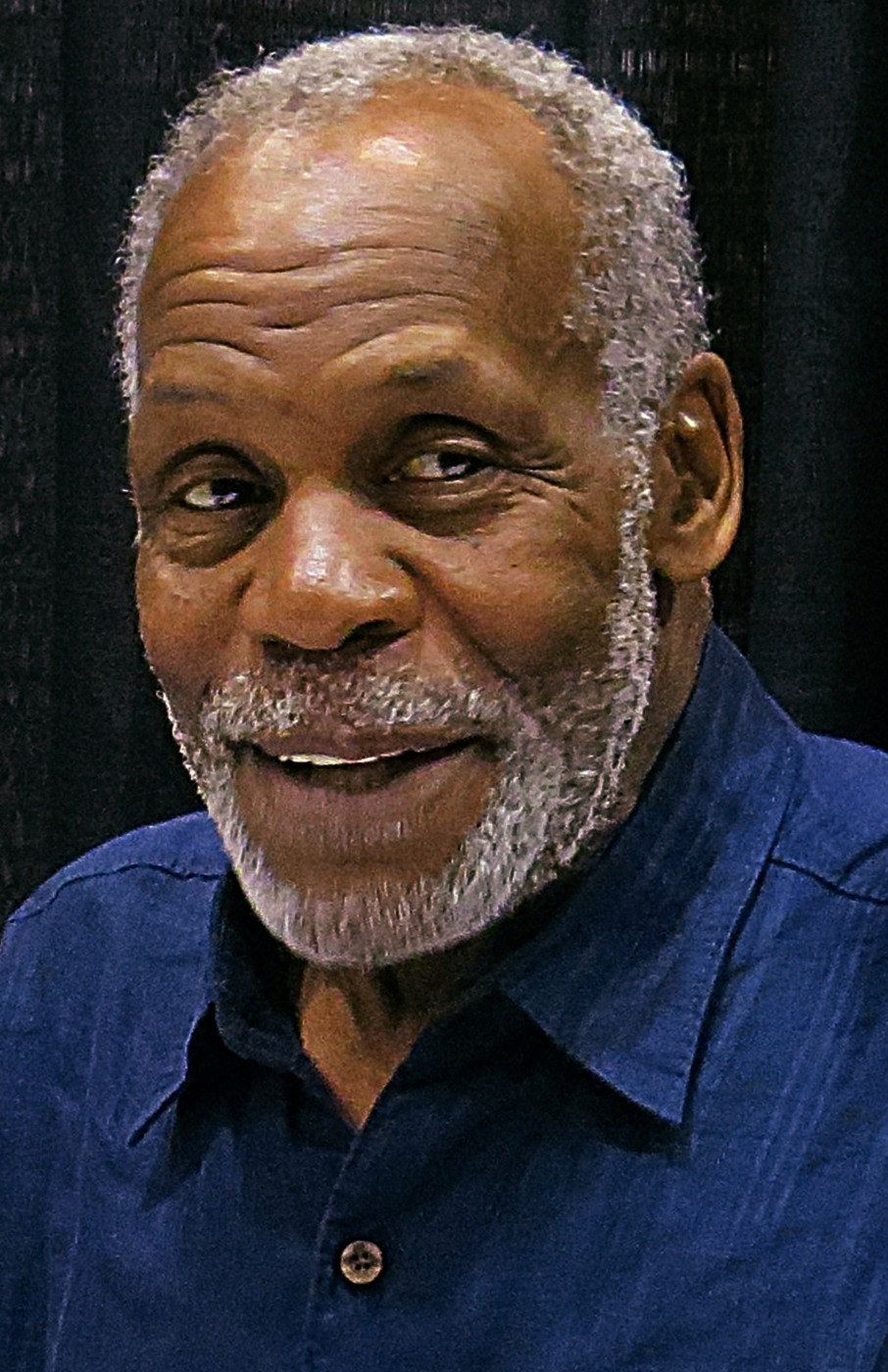
Danny Glover appears as Derek Morgan's father.

Aisha Tyler joined the cast in the wake of Hewitt's exit, and played a recurring role as Dr. Tara Lewis, a forensic psychologist who always wanted to study psychopaths up close, to understand the human being behind the evil acts. Her previous job was to interview serial killers and determine whether they were fit to stand trial. It was announced that Tim Kang would guest-star on the show in the second episode of the season, "The Witness". while Marisol Nichols is set to make an appearance. It was announced on August 5, 2015, that an alum from Glee, Ashley Fink, would guest star in the third episode of the season, "'Til Death Do Us Part". Amber Stevens returned as Rossi's daughter, Joy Struthers, in episode seven, "Target Rich". Aubrey Plaza also had a guest role in episode eleven, "Entropy".

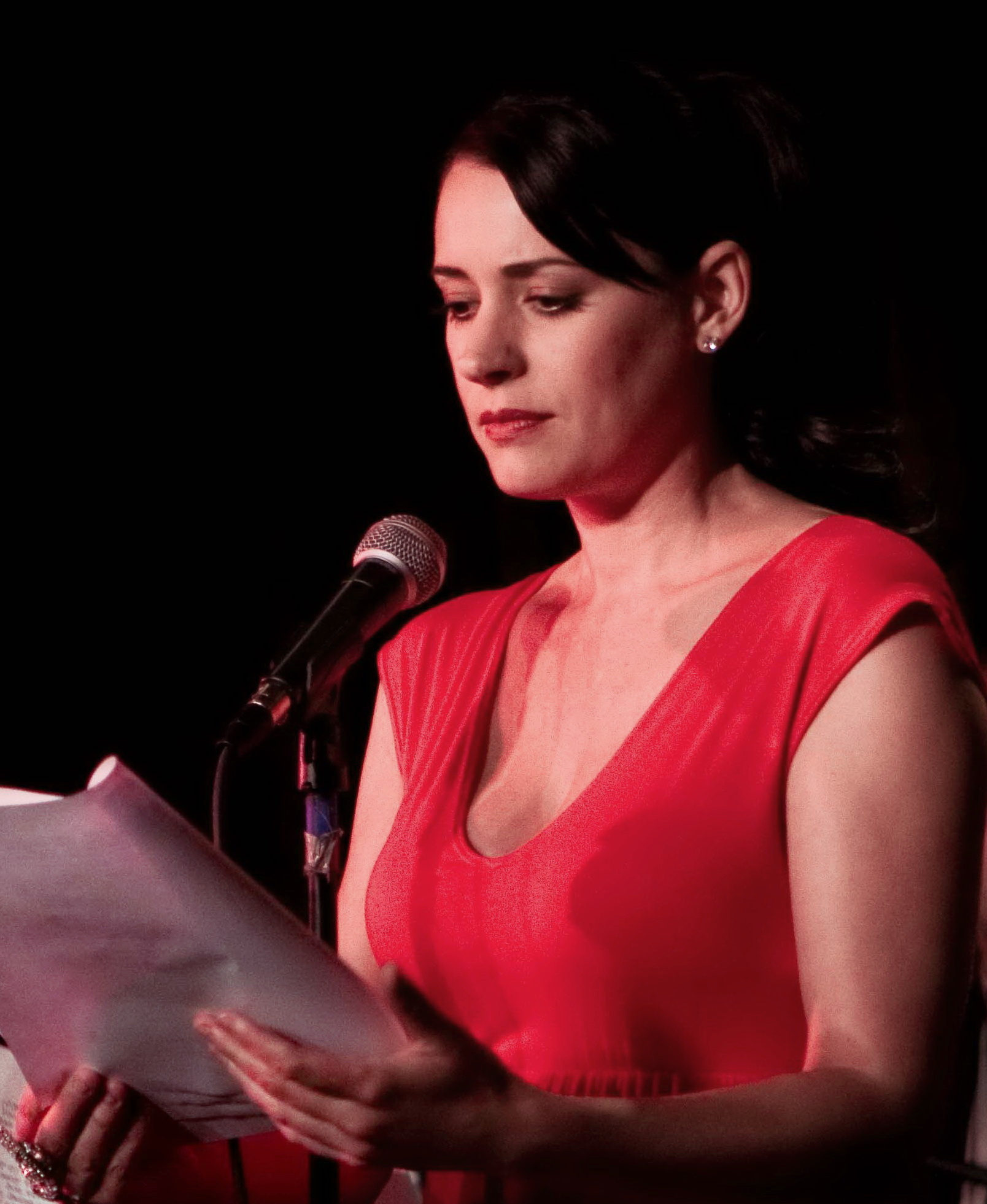
Paget Brewster returns as Emily Prentiss for one episode this season.

On January 14, 2016, CBS announced that actor Danny Glover would guest-star as Derek Morgan's deceased father in the episode "Derek".

On February 10, 2016, CBS announced that actor Paget Brewster would guest star in one episode in the latter part of the season, reprising her role as Emily Prentiss.

In an interview with TVGuide, Erica Messer expressed her interest about bringing back characters from previous seasons instead of adding a new character to replace Hewitt permanently on the show. She explained, "I feel like when you look at 10 years of people we could bring back, it would be fun to do that." Messer added that bringing back old characters would allow the show to focus on the team without having to service a new regular character.

== Episodes ==
No. overall	No. in season	Title	Directed by	Written by	Original release date	Prod. code	U.S. viewers (millions)
234	1	"The Job"	Glenn Kershaw	Breen Frazier	September 30, 2015	1101	10.08
When two men — one in Albany, New York and the other in Seattle, Washington — are found dead with a distinctive mask painted on their faces, the BAU sets out to track down a highly skilled hitman targeting his former clients. Meanwhile, with JJ on maternity leave following the birth of her second son, Michael, and Kate resigning from the team, Hotch asks forensic psychologist and potential new team member Dr. Tara Lewis (Aisha Tyler) to assist in the investigation.
235	2	"The Witness"	John Terlesky	Sharon Lee Watson	October 7, 2015	1102	9.08
When a sarin gas attack on a Los Angeles, California commuter bus claims the lives of 10 people, the BAU works with the local FBI field office to determine whether the attack was a deliberate act of terrorism or aimed at a specific target.
236	3	"'Til Death Do Us Part"	Joe Mantegna	Karen Maser	October 14, 2015	1103	9.08
When two out-of-state brides-to-be are found dead in Savannah, Georgia and a third is reported missing, the BAU suspects the crimes were committed by a mentally disturbed female killer suffering from severe rejection. Meanwhile, Garcia grows increasingly concerned as she attempts to identify the potential targets on incarcerated hitman Giuseppe Montolo's hit list, "The Dirty Dozen."
237	4	"Outlaw"	Larry Teng	Virgil Williams	October 21, 2015	1104	8.47
When three employees at a Las Vegas, New Mexico diner are gunned down in an aggravated robbery-arson and the investigation is linked to an eerily similar case at another restaurant across town in which four teenagers were killed six years earlier, the BAU sets out to apprehend a pair of outlaw bikers before they strike again.
238	5	"The Night Watch"	Thomas Gibson	Bruce Zimmerman	October 28, 2015	1105	7.64
When a Detroit, Michigan community activist's corpse is incorporated into a grisly piece of graffiti art and an eight-month-old Grosse Pointe girl is abducted, the BAU juggles tracking down the missing baby and identifying an infamous street artist who has been active around the country for the last eight years. Meanwhile, Lewis' fiancé, Doug, reaches his breaking point with her conducting several interviews with an incarcerated psychopath and announces he is breaking up with her.
239	6	"Pariahville"	Félix Enríquez Alcalá	Erik Stiller	November 4, 2015	1106	7.79
When a registered Florida sex offender is stabbed to death in her home and found wearing a cheerleader's uniform, the BAU finds themselves faced with the daunting task of interrogating nearly 2,000 residents of a community designed to house paroled criminals with non-violent pasts. Meanwhile, Lewis contemplates accepting a major job promotion that threatens to take her away from the team.
240	7	"Target Rich"	Glenn Kershaw	Jim Clemente	November 11, 2015	1107	8.51
When Rossi's daughter, Joy (Amber Stevens), discovers a pattern of four missing female college students along the East Coast from over the last nine years and reports that a fifth disappeared from an Alexandria, Virginia university the night before, the BAU sets out to track down the latest victim and determine if all five cases are related. Meanwhile, Morgan receives a cryptic warning about "The Dirty Dozen" from Giuseppe Montolo right before the latter unexpectedly dies, JJ returns from her maternity leave, and Reid becomes concerned about his mother's well-being.
241	8	"Awake"	Christoph Schrewe	Kimberly Ann Harrison	November 18, 2015	1108	8.14
When two Phoenix, Arizona men are abducted and one is found dead, the BAU sets out to track down a killer who tortures his victims by depriving them of sleep. Meanwhile, JJ deals with the stress of raising two children and Hotch takes desperate measures to protect Garcia from Montolo's hitman network.
242	9	"Internal Affairs"	Diana C. Valentine	Sharon Lee Watson	December 2, 2015	1109	8.75
When three undercover DEA agents disappear while investigating an underground drug cartel in El Paso, Texas and one of the agents is found dead in Juárez, Mexico with a crudely removed face covering his own, the NSA calls in the BAU to track down the two missing agents and identify a mole with ties to the cartel. Meanwhile, Hotch uses the investigation as an opportunity to bring the team closer to tracking down Montolo's followers.
243	10	"Future Perfect"	Laura Belsey	Bruce Zimmerman	December 9, 2015	1110	9.27
When two bodies are found in a swamp outside St. Augustine, Florida, the BAU sets out to profile a killer who uses his victims as test subjects for gruesome medical experiments. Meanwhile, Garcia grows anxious as the team begins to zero in on the identities of Montolo's followers.
244	11	"Entropy"	Heather Cappiello	Breen Frazier	January 13, 2016	1111	9.33
As the BAU draws up an elaborate plan to shut down Montolo's hitman network, Reid is given the task of engaging in a high-stakes game of wits against a narcissistic psychopath (Aubrey Plaza) determined to learn why he took a leave of absence.
245	12	"Drive"	Tawnia McKiernan	Karen Maser	January 20, 2016	1112	9.25
When three Boston, Massachusetts women are abducted, decapitated, and dumped in various public locations, the BAU suspects the killer and his victims are connected to a local ride-share service.
246	13	"The Bond"	Hanelle M. Culpepper	Kimberly Ann Harrison	January 27, 2016	1113	9.22
When two elderly people are stabbed to death and posed in different truck stop restrooms — one in Birmingham, Alabama and the other in Chattanooga, Tennessee — the BAU works with the Atlanta, Georgia FBI field office to identify a killer acting on orders from someone determined to exact revenge against the people who wronged them.
247	14	"Hostage"	Bethany Rooney	Virgil Williams	February 10, 2016	1114	8.97
When a teenage St. Louis, Missouri foster girl, who had been missing for the last 10 years, escapes her kidnapper and leads local authorities to a house where she claims she was held against her will with two other girls, one of whom subsequently dies in the hospital, the BAU juggles tracking down the abductor and rescuing his third victim.
248	15	"A Badge and a Gun"	Rob Bailey	Jim Clemente	February 24, 2016	1115	8.64
When three single Los Angeles, California women are fatally suffocated in their homes and security footage shows the latest victim inviting a man in moments before her death, the BAU works with the local FBI field office to identify the killer and determine whether or not he is one of their own. Meanwhile, Morgan suspects Savannah wants to end their relationship after receiving a cryptic text message.
249	16	"Derek"	Thomas Gibson	Breen Frazier	March 2, 2016	1116	9.32
When Morgan is abducted by a team of international mercenaries, the BAU sets out to rescue their missing colleague. Meanwhile, Morgan hallucinates reuniting with his late father, Hank (Danny Glover), as he disassociates his mind from the pain his kidnappers inflict on him.
250	17	"The Sandman"	Joe Mantegna	Bruce Zimmerman	March 16, 2016	1117	9.80
When a Wichita, Kansas couple is found dead in their home with sand and glue in their eyes and their son is abducted, the BAU sets out to profile an escalating family annihilator before he strikes again. Meanwhile, Morgan returns from a six-month leave of absence and juggles identifying the mastermind behind his abduction and preparing for the birth of his first child.
251	18	"A Beautiful Disaster"	Matthew Gray Gubler	Kirsten Vangsness & Erica Messer	March 23, 2016	1118	10.94
As Savannah prepares to go into labor, a sniper non-lethally guns her down. With Morgan's wife and baby's fates hanging in the balance, the BAU prepares for a final showdown against the hitman network's last known remaining follower (Lance Henriksen). Meanwhile, after being denied access to the case due to witnessing the shooting, Morgan makes a decision that promises to forever change the course of the team.
252	19	"Tribute"	Tawnia McKiernan	Virgil Williams	March 30, 2016	1119	9.17
When former SSA Emily Prentiss (Paget Brewster) connects a copycat killing in New York City to an international killer who has emulated a series of high-profile murders in Russia and England over the last two years, the BAU sets out to determine his next move before he strikes again. Meanwhile, the team continues to deal with the fallout of Morgan's departure.
253	20	"Inner Beauty"	Alec Smight	Haben Merker	April 13, 2016	1120	8.81
When two unidentified women are found dead with their faces disfigured in the basement of a Sacramento, California apartment building, the BAU attempts to profile a killer who molds his victims into his vision of the ideal woman. Meanwhile, Rossi finds himself in an awkward reunion with his second wife, Hayden (Sheryl Lee Ralph).
254	21	"Devil's Backbone"	Félix Enríquez Alcalá	Sharon Lee Watson	April 20, 2016	1121	9.14
When guards at a Troy, Virginia prison intercept a package containing clothes stained with blood, the BAU deduces they belong to two boys who have been missing for the last two years. The team questions the package's intended recipient, a serial killer (Frances Fisher) convicted of the murders of nine teenagers 15 years earlier, to determine whether or not she was involved in the boys' disappearances.
255	22	"The Storm"	Glenn Kershaw	Erica Messer & Breen Frazier	May 4, 2016	1122	8.84
When Hotch is falsely accused of conspiracy to commit a terrorist attack by the Department of Justice, the remaining members of the BAU juggle clearing his name and identifying the people responsible for framing him.

== Ratings ==
=== Live + SD ratings ===
No. in series	No. in season	Episode	Air date	Time slot (EST)	Rating/Share (18–49)	Viewers (m)	18–49 Rank	Viewership rank	Drama rank
234	1	"The Job"	September 30, 2015	Wednesday; 9:00 P.M.	2.0/6	10.08	21	15	7
235	2	"The Witness"	October 7, 2015	Wednesday; 9:00 P.M.	1.7/5	9.08	24	15	9
236	3	"'Til Death Do Us Part"	October 14, 2015	Wednesday; 9:00 P.M.	1.7/5	9.08	23	15	8
237	4	"Outlaw"	October 21, 2015	Wednesday; 9:00 P.M.	1.6/5	8.47	—N/a	21	—N/a
238	5	"The Night Watch"	October 28, 2015	Wednesday; 9:00 P.M.	1.6/5	7.64	—N/a	—N/a	—N/a
239	6	"Pariahville"	November 4, 2015	Wednesday; 9:00 P.M.	1.5/4	7.79	—N/a	—N/a	—N/a
240	7	"Target Rich"	November 11, 2015	Wednesday; 9:00 P.M.	1.6/5	8.51	—N/a	15	—N/a
241	8	"Awake"	November 18, 2015	Wednesday; 9:00 P.M.	1.5/5	8.14	—N/a	22	—N/a
242	9	"Internal Affairs"	December 2, 2015	Wednesday; 9:00 P.M.	1.6/4	8.75	24	15	5
243	10	"Future Perfect"	December 9, 2015	Wednesday; 9:00 P.M.	1.9/6	9.27	16	17	4
244	11	"Entropy"	January 13, 2016	Wednesday; 9:00 P.M.	2.0/6	9.33	9	10	2
245	12	"Drive"	January 20, 2016	Wednesday; 9:00 P.M.	2.0/6	9.25	10	13	4
246	13	"The Bond"	January 27, 2016	Wednesday; 9:00 P.M.	2.0/6	9.22	8	10	2
247	14	"Hostage"	February 10, 2016	Wednesday; 9:00 P.M.	1.8/6	8.97	16	12	6
248	15	"A Badge and a Gun"	February 24, 2016	Wednesday; 9:00 P.M.	1.8/6	8.64	19	15	7
249	16	"Derek"	March 2, 2016	Wednesday; 9:00 P.M.	1.9/6	9.32	10	8	6
250	17	"The Sandman"	March 16, 2016	Wednesday; 9:00 P.M.	1.9/7	9.80	11	7	4
251	18	"A Beautiful Disaster"	March 23, 2016	Wednesday; 9:00 P.M.	2.2/7	10.94	8	6	4
252	19	"Tribute"	March 30, 2016	Wednesday; 9:00 P.M.	1.8/6	9.17	10	11	6
253	20	"Inner Beauty"	April 13, 2016	Wednesday; 9:00 P.M.	1.7/6	8.81	11	13	7
254	21	"Devil's Backbone"	April 20, 2016	Wednesday; 9:00 P.M.	1.7/6	9.14	10	11	7
255	22	"The Storm"	May 4, 2016	Wednesday; 9:00 P.M.	1.8/6	8.84	12	12	9

=== Live + 7 Day (DVR) ratings ===
No. in series	No. in season	Episode	Air date	Time slot (EST)	18–49 rating increase	Viewers (millions) increase	Total 18-49	Total viewers (millions)	Ref
234	1	"The Job"	September 30, 2015	Wednesday; 9:00 P.M.	1.3	3.93	3.3	14.01	
235	2	"The Witness"	October 7, 2015	Wednesday; 9:00 P.M.	1.3	3.88	3.0	12.96	
236	3	"'Til Death Do Us Part"	October 14, 2015	Wednesday; 9:00 P.M.	1.2	3.66	2.9	12.74	
237	4	"Outlaw"	October 21, 2015	Wednesday; 9:00 P.M.	1.3	3.67	2.9	12.14	
238	5	"The Night Watch"	October 28, 2015	Wednesday; 9:00 P.M.	1.4	4.18	3.0	11.82	
239	6	"Pariahville"	November 4, 2015	Wednesday; 9:00 P.M.	1.5	3.80	2.8	11.59	
240	7	"Target Rich"	November 11, 2015	Wednesday; 9:00 P.M.	1.3	3.77	2.9	12.28	
241	8	"Awake"	November 18, 2015	Wednesday; 9:00 P.M.	1.1	3.55	2.6	11.69	
242	9	"Internal Affairs"	December 2, 2015	Wednesday; 9:00 P.M.	1.1	3.63	2.7	12.38	
243	10	"Future Perfect"	December 9, 2015	Wednesday; 9:00 P.M.	1.3	3.66	3.2	12.93	
244	11	"Entropy"	January 13, 2016	Wednesday; 9:00 P.M.	1.3	3.92	3.3	13.25	
245	12	"Drive"	January 20, 2016	Wednesday; 9:00 P.M.	1.3	3.72	3.3	12.97	
246	13	"The Bond"	January 27, 2016	Wednesday; 9:00 P.M.	1.2	3.64	3.2	12.88	
247	14	"Hostage"	February 10, 2016	Wednesday; 9:00 P.M.	1.2	3.68	3.0	12.65	
248	15	"A Badge and a Gun"	February 24, 2016	Wednesday; 9:00 P.M.	1.2	3.75	3.0	12.43	
249	16	"Derek"	March 2, 2016	Wednesday; 9:00 P.M.	1.3	3.77	3.2	13.09	
250	17	"The Sandman"	March 16, 2016	Wednesday; 9:00 P.M.	1.4	3.99	3.3	13.79	
251	18	"A Beautiful Disaster"	March 23, 2016	Wednesday; 9:00 P.M.	1.3	4.24	3.5	15.19	
252	19	"Tribute"	March 30, 2016	Wednesday; 9:00 P.M.	1.1	3.66	2.9	12.84	
253	20	"Inner Beauty"	April 13, 2016	Wednesday; 9:00 P.M.	1.0	3.37	2.7	12.18	
254	21	"Devil's Backbone"	April 20, 2016	Wednesday; 9:00 P.M.	1.1	3.31	2.8	12.45	
255	22	"The Storm"	May 4, 2016	Wednesday; 9:00 P.M.	1.1	3.60	2.9	12.41	

== Home media ==
The Complete Eleventh Season
Set details		Special features
22 episodes; 6-disc set (Region 1); 5-disc set (Region 2 & 4); Aspect Ratio: 1.78:1; Subtitles: English; English: Dolby Digital 5.1		The Dirty Eleven; To Derek, With Love; The Good Doctor; Criminology; Gag Reel; Deleted Scenes
DVD release date
Region 1	Region 2	Region 4
August 30, 2016	December 5, 2016	December 7, 2016
