= Criminal Minds season 8 =

Season of television series Criminal Minds

Criminal Minds
- Season 8
- Season 8 U.S. DVD cover
- Starring: Joe Mantegna; Shemar Moore; Matthew Gray Gubler; A. J. Cook; Kirsten Vangsness; Jeanne Tripplehorn; Thomas Gibson
- No. of episodes: 24

Release
- Original network: CBS
- Original release: September 26, 2012 – May 22, 2013

Season chronology
- ← Previous; Season 7 Next → Season 9

The eighth season of Criminal Minds premiered on CBS on September 26, 2012. The series was renewed on March 14, 2012.

In Canada, season eight aired one day earlier on CTV than on CBS in the United States.

== Cast ==
On February 15, 2012, Deadline Hollywood reported that Paget Brewster (Emily Prentiss) would leave the show once season seven was over. All other main cast members had secured deals for the season. On June 13, 2012, CBS announced that Jeanne Tripplehorn would join the cast of the show.

=== Main ===
- Joe Mantegna as Supervisory Special Agent David Rossi (BAU Senior Agent)
- Shemar Moore as Supervisory Special Agent Derek Morgan (BAU Agent)
- Matthew Gray Gubler as Supervisory Special Agent Dr. Spencer Reid (BAU Agent)
- A. J. Cook as Supervisory Special Agent Jennifer "JJ" Jareau (BAU Agent)
- Kirsten Vangsness as Technical Analyst Penelope Garcia (BAU Technical Analyst & Co-Communications Liaison)
- Jeanne Tripplehorn as Supervisory Special Agent Dr. Alex Blake (BAU Agent)
- Thomas Gibson as Supervisory Special Agent Aaron "Hotch" Hotchner (BAU Unit Chief & Co-Communications Liaison)

=== Recurring ===
- Jayne Atkinson as Supervisory Special Agent Erin Strauss (BAU Section Chief)
- Beth Riesgraf as Maeve Donovan
- Mekhai Andersen as Henry LaMontagne
- Nicholas Brendon as Kevin Lynch
- Cade Owens as Jack Hotchner
- Bellamy Young as Beth Clemmons
- Josh Stewart as William "Will" LaMontagne Jr.
- Skipp Sudduth as Stan Gordinski
- Mark Hamill as John Curtis / The Replicator

== Episodes ==
No. overall	No. in season	Title	Directed by	Written by	Original release date	Prod. code	U.S. viewers (millions)
163	1	"The Silencer"	Glenn Kershaw	Erica Messer	September 26, 2012	801	11.73
When an ambulance transporting an Abilene, Texas inmate crashes and three men are found dead inside the vehicle, including a prison guard with his mouth sewn shut, the BAU works with the U.S. Marshals Service to determine whether or not a still unidentified serial killer known as "The Silencer", who murdered three women in a similar manner eight years earlier, has resurfaced. Meanwhile, with Prentiss accepting a leadership position at Interpol, the team welcomes their newest member, linguistics expert Alex Blake (Jeanne Tripplehorn), into the fold.
164	2	"The Pact"	Karen Gaviola	Janine Sherman Barrois	October 10, 2012	802	11.49
When two Southern California residents — a San Diego woman and a Los Angeles man — are killed within hours of each other, the BAU suspects two vigilantes are working in concert to deliver their own brand of justice against paroled criminals. Meanwhile, Rossi comes up with a unique way to spend his accumulating vacation days without taking any time off.
165	3	"Through the Looking Glass"	Dermott Downs	Sharon Lee Watson	October 17, 2012	803	11.81
When three members of a missing Kansas City, Kansas family of four are found shot to death in an alleged murder-suicide, with one of the two children still missing, and another family of four subsequently disappears from Lenexa, the BAU sets out to track down a family annihilator who stalks his victims and forces them to confess their wrongdoings to each other. Meanwhile, Hotch receives surprising news that threatens to test his relationship with Beth.
166	4	"God Complex"	Larry Teng	Breen Frazier	October 24, 2012	804	11.61
When a legless corpse is found in Juárez, Mexico and a man wakes up in a New Mexico motel with his right foot removed, the BAU sets out to profile an unqualified surgeon (Ray Wise) who thinks he can defy human biology. Meanwhile, Reid's secret phone conversations with a mysterious woman (Beth Riesgraf) leave the rest of the team intrigued.
167	5	"The Good Earth"	John Terlesky	Bruce Zimmerman	October 31, 2012	805	11.99
When four La Grande, Oregon men disappear and a puddle of vomit found at the scene of the latest victim's last-known sighting reveals he had elevated levels of melatonin in his system, the BAU attempts to find a common link between the victims. Meanwhile, JJ grows worried after learning Henry is adamant about not celebrating Halloween.
168	6	"The Apprenticeship"	Rob Bailey	Virgil Williams	November 7, 2012	806	12.09
When a Miami, Florida prostitute is murdered in a manner similar to a recent series of dog killings, the BAU sets out to profile an escalating duo consisting of a middle-aged, experienced criminal and an aspiring teenage killer who idolizes him. Meanwhile, Morgan attempts to convince Reid to join the bureau softball team and Hotch receives an unnerving phone call.
169	7	"The Fallen"	Doug Aarniokoski	Teleplay by : Rick Dunkle; Story by : Rick Dunkle & Danny Ramm	November 14, 2012	807	12.20
When three people in Santa Monica, California are abducted, burned beyond recognition, and found near the city's famous pier, the BAU sets out to catch a mission-oriented killer who views his victims as viruses to the community. Meanwhile, Rossi reflects on his days as a Marine fighting in the Vietnam War when he unexpectedly reunites with his former sergeant (Meshach Taylor).
170	8	"The Wheels on the Bus"	Rob Hardy	Kimberly Ann Harrison	November 21, 2012	808	11.53
When a school bus transporting 24 Fredericksburg, Virginia high school students disappears, the BAU determines the crime was committed by two brothers with an extreme gaming addiction, who are looking to replicate their favorite violent video game.
171	9	"Magnificent Light"	John T. Kretchmer	Sharon Lee Watson	November 28, 2012	809	12.37
When two Seattle, Washington residents are stabbed to death in their homes, the BAU suspects a popular motivational speaker is behind the murders. Meanwhile, Garcia becomes concerned when Morgan declines an invitation to give a speech honoring an old family friend at a gala hosted by the British Embassy.
172	10	"The Lesson"	Matthew Gray Gubler	Janine Sherman Barrois	December 5, 2012	810	11.33
When two Winslow, Arizona men are found dead in coffin-like boxes with marked changes in their appearances and the second victim's girlfriend is reported missing, the BAU sets out to track down a "collector"-type killer (Brad Dourif) with an unusual obsession. Meanwhile, Reid grows increasingly anxious after his mystery woman, Maeve, proposes a face-to-face meeting.
173	11	"Perennials"	Michael Lange	Bruce Zimmerman	December 12, 2012	811	12.01
When a Gulfport, Mississippi man and a Citronelle, Alabama woman are hammered to death through a chisel in the back of the head, the BAU launches an intense manhunt for a killer whose signature matches that of another who murdered eight prostitutes over a 20-year period. Meanwhile, Hotch realizes that someone is deliberately replicating crimes the team recently solved.
174	12	"Zugzwang"	Jesse Warn	Breen Frazier	January 16, 2013	812	12.64
When Reid receives a cryptic phone call that leads him to conclude Maeve's stalker has abducted her, the BAU juggles tracking down Maeve and her kidnapper and preventing one of their own from suffering a mental breakdown.
175	13	"Magnum Opus"	Glenn Kershaw	Jason J. Bernero	January 23, 2013	813	11.84
With Reid taking time off to seclude himself in the wake of Maeve's death, the remaining members of the BAU travel to San Francisco, California to investigate the murders of two people who were both exsanguinated and wrapped in plastic postmortem.
176	14	"All That Remains"	Thomas Gibson	Erica Messer	February 6, 2013	815	11.98
When two teenage Salisbury, Maryland sisters are reported missing on the anniversary of their mother's mysterious disappearance, the BAU juggles tracking down the girls and determining whether or not their father is a suspect in both cases.
177	15	"Broken"	Larry Teng	Rick Dunkle	February 20, 2013	814	10.69
When three Austin, Texas residents are savagely beaten to death and found with watches set to a specific time, the BAU attempts to profile a killer suffering from a severe identity crisis.
178	16	"Carbon Copy"	Rob Hardy	Virgil Williams	February 27, 2013	816	10.33
When two Philadelphia, Pennsylvania women are found exsanguinated with their eyelids removed, the BAU suspects the crimes were committed by "The Replicator" and sets out to prevent him from striking again. Meanwhile, Blake struggles with her personal demons after Strauss asks to make amends for her past actions.
179	17	"The Gathering"	Michael Lange	Kimberly Ann Harrison	March 20, 2013	817	11.58
With the Replicator case declared inactive, the BAU travels to Saint Paul, Minnesota to investigate the murders of two women, who both had their tongues removed, and track down a serial killer targeting women who document their personal lives and inner fantasies on social media sites. Meanwhile, Garcia suspects Kevin is jealous of her new love interest after introducing them to each other.
180	18	"Restoration"	Félix Alcalá	Jim Clemente & Janine Sherman Barrois	April 3, 2013	818	10.79
When two Chicago, Illinois men are found beaten to death with their pants pulled down to their legs, the BAU attempts to identify a spree killer who sees his victims as child molestors. Meanwhile, Morgan becomes personally involved in the case after a major revelation forces him to confront his childhood abuser.
181	19	"Pay It Forward"	John Terlesky	Bruce Zimmerman	April 10, 2013	819	11.47
When a severed head is discovered in a Colorado time capsule that was buried 25 years earlier and a local retired police officer's decapitated corpse is subsequently found, the BAU juggles delving into the victims' personal lives and profiling an escalating vigilante who perceives his victims as hypocrites.
182	20	"Alchemy"	Matthew Gray Gubler	Sharon Lee Watson	May 1, 2013	820	10.13
When two South Dakota men are poisoned, dismembered, and found with ritualistic markings on their bodies, the BAU determines the crimes were committed by a Rapid City hotel owner who suffered a devastating loss. Meanwhile, Reid works with Rossi to determine the cause of his recent bouts of insomnia.
183	21	"Nanny Dearest"	Doug Aarniokoski	Virgil Williams	May 8, 2013	821	10.08
When a California serial killer, who annually abducts nannies and the children they watch on the same day, strikes earlier than usual in Los Angeles, the BAU juggles tracking down the current missing nanny and the two-year-old girl she was hired to watch and convincing the only known survivor to help them identify the killer.
184	22	"#6"	Karen Gaviola	Breen Frazier	May 15, 2013	822	10.56
When two Detroit, Michigan couples are found stabbed to death in their car trunks, the BAU sets out to catch a proxy killer who forces his victims to kill each other for him to fulfill a twisted need. Meanwhile, Blake contemplates her future with the team after her husband, James (D.W. Moffett), returns from overseas with a potentially life-changing proposition.
185	23	"Brothers Hotchner"	Rob Bailey	Rick Dunkle	May 22, 2013	823	11.01
While vacationing in New York City with Beth and Jack, Hotch receives a phone call from his younger brother, Sean (Eric Johnson), who says that a woman died of an ecstasy overdose at a bar Sean works at. When Hotch learns that four other people in the city, including Sean's girlfriend, died of similar causes over the last week, the BAU attempts to profile a sociopathic poisoner attempting to make a statement. Meanwhile, Hotch struggles to keep himself from becoming emotionally involved in the case.
186	24	"The Replicator"	Glenn Kershaw	Erica Messer	May 22, 2013	824	11.01
After "The Replicator" (Mark Hamill) hacks into Garcia's computer system, kills Strauss by breaking into her hotel room and forcing her to drink ecstasy-laced wine at gunpoint, and leaves Hotch a taunting message, the BAU is given 24 hours to identify the motive behind the stalker-turned-serial killer's twisted spree and officially put an end to it.

== Ratings ==
Episode	U.S. ratings				Canada ratings			
Episode	Original air date	Viewers (millions)	Rank		Original air date	Viewers (millions)	Rank	
Episode	Original air date	Viewers (millions)	Night	Week	Original air date	Viewers (millions)	Night	Week
"The Silencer"	September 26, 2012	11.73	2	15	September 25, 2012	1.34	5	25
"The Pact"	October 10, 2012	11.49	3	15	October 9, 2012	1.56	4	17
"Through the Looking Glass"	October 17, 2012	11.81	2	12	October 16, 2012	—N/a	—N/a	—N/a
"God Complex"	October 24, 2012	11.61	3	15	October 23, 2012	2.31	—N/a	7
"The Good Earth"	October 31, 2012	11.99	1	13	October 30, 2012	—N/a	—N/a	—N/a
"The Apprenticeship"	November 7, 2012	12.09	2	7	November 6, 2012	—N/a	—N/a	—N/a
"The Fallen"	November 14, 2012	12.20	1	9	November 13, 2012	—N/a	—N/a	—N/a
"The Wheels on the Bus..."	November 21, 2012	11.53	1	10	November 20, 2012	—N/a	—N/a	—N/a
"Magnificent Light"	November 28, 2012	12.37	1	10	November 27, 2012	—N/a	—N/a	—N/a
"The Lesson"	December 5, 2012	11.33	1	10	December 4, 2012	—N/a	—N/a	—N/a
"Perennials"	December 12, 2012	12.01	1	10	December 11, 2012	—N/a	—N/a	—N/a
"Zugzwang"	January 16, 2013	12.64	2	8	January 15, 2013	—N/a	—N/a	—N/a
"Magnum Opus"	January 23, 2013	11.84	1	6	January 22, 2013	—N/a	—N/a	—N/a
"All That Remains"	February 6, 2013	11.98	2	9	February 5, 2013	—N/a	—N/a	—N/a
"Broken"	February 20, 2013	10.69	2	14	February 19, 2013	—N/a	—N/a	—N/a
"Carbon Copy"	February 27, 2013	10.33	3	11	February 26, 2013	—N/a	—N/a	—N/a
"The Gathering"	March 20, 2013	11.58	2	6	March 19, 2013	—N/a	—N/a	—N/a
"Restoration"	April 3, 2013	10.79	3	17	April 2, 2013	—N/a	—N/a	—N/a
"Pay It Forward"	April 10, 2013	11.47	2	12	April 9, 2013	—N/a	—N/a	—N/a
"Alchemy"	May 1, 2013	10.13	2	14	April 30, 2013	—N/a	—N/a	—N/a
"Nanny Dearest"	May 8, 2013	10.08	2	16	May 7, 2013	—N/a	—N/a	—N/a
"#6"	May 15, 2013	10.56	2	11	May 15, 2013	—N/a	—N/a	—N/a
"Brothers Hotchner"	May 22, 2013	11.01	1	3	May 22, 2013	—N/a	—N/a	—N/a
"The Replicator"	May 22, 2013	11.01	1	3	May 22, 2013	—N/a	—N/a	—N/a

== Home media ==
The Complete Eighth Season
Set details		Special features
24 episodes; 6-disc set (Region 1); 5-disc set (Region 2 & 4); Aspect Ratio: 1.78:1; Subtitles: English; English: Dolby Digital 5.1		Beautiful Minds; Gag Reel; Deleted Scenes
DVD release date
Region 1	Region 2	Region 4
September 3, 2013	December 9, 2013	December 4, 2013
