= List of Alias episodes =

Alias is an American action, drama, thriller, and science fiction television series which debuted on September 30, 2001, on ABC. The series follows Jennifer Garner as Sydney Bristow, a double agent for the CIA working inside of the counter-government agency SD-6. The main theme of the series explores Sydney's obligation to conceal her true career from her friends and family, even as she assumes multiple aliases to carry out her missions. These themes are most prevalent in the first two seasons of the show. A major plotline of the series is the search for and recovery of artifacts created by Milo Rambaldi, a Renaissance-era character with similarities to both Leonardo da Vinci and Nostradamus. On May 22, 2006 the series completed its run, airing a total of 105 episodes over five seasons. An animated short was included on the DVD release of season 3. In addition to the individual season sets, the complete series was released on DVD with a bonus disc and a book that reveals the deepest secrets of the series, packaged in a "Rambaldi artifact box".

== Series overview ==
Season	Episodes	Originally released	
Season	Episodes	First released	Last released
1	22	September 30, 2001	May 12, 2002
2	22	September 29, 2002	May 4, 2003
3	22	September 28, 2003	May 23, 2004
4	22	January 5, 2005	May 25, 2005
5	17	September 29, 2005	May 22, 2006

== Episodes ==
=== Season 1 (2001–02) ===
No. overall	No. in season	Title	Directed by	Written by	Original release date	US viewers (millions)
1	1	"Truth Be Told"	J. J. Abrams	J. J. Abrams	September 30, 2001	15.05
2	2	"So It Begins"	Ken Olin	J. J. Abrams	October 7, 2001	10.74
3	3	"Parity"	Mikael Salomon	Alex Kurtzman & Roberto Orci	October 14, 2001	11.34
4	4	"A Broken Heart"	Harry Winer	Vanessa Taylor	October 21, 2001	10.76
5	5	"Doppelgänger"	Ken Olin	Daniel Arkin	October 28, 2001	10.03
6	6	"Reckoning"	Dan Attias	Jesse Alexander	November 18, 2001	9.21
7	7	"Color Blind"	Jack Bender	Roberto Orci & Alex Kurtzman	November 25, 2001	9.65
8	8	"Time Will Tell"	Perry Lang	Jeff Pinkner	December 2, 2001	11.12
9	9	"Mea Culpa"	Ken Olin	Debra J. Fisher & Erica Messer	December 9, 2001	10.01
10	10	"Spirit"	Jack Bender	J. J. Abrams & Vanessa Taylor	December 16, 2001	9.99
11	11	"The Confession"	Harry Winer	J. J. Abrams & Daniel Arkin	January 6, 2002	10.70
12	12	"The Box (Part 1)"	Jack Bender	Jesse Alexander & John Eisendrath	January 20, 2002	9.38
13	13	"The Box (Part 2)"	Jack Bender	Jesse Alexander & John Eisendrath	February 10, 2002	9.85
14	14	"The Coup"	Thomas J. Wright	Alex Kurtzman & Roberto Orci	February 24, 2002	8.83
15	15	"Page 47"	Ken Olin	J. J. Abrams & Jeff Pinkner	March 3, 2002	10.36
16	16	"The Prophecy"	Davis Guggenheim	John Eisendrath	March 10, 2002	8.39
17	17	"Q & A"	Ken Olin	J. J. Abrams	March 17, 2002	10.74
18	18	"Masquerade"	Craig Zisk	Alex Kurtzman & Roberto Orci	April 7, 2002	10.53
19	19	"Snowman"	Barnet Kellman	Jesse Alexander & Jeff Pinkner	April 14, 2002	7.80
20	20	"The Solution"	Dan Attias	John Eisendrath	April 21, 2002	8.90
21	21	"Rendezvous"	Ken Olin	Debra J. Fisher & Erica Messer	May 5, 2002	8.08
22	22	"Almost Thirty Years"	J. J. Abrams	J. J. Abrams	May 12, 2002	11.25

=== Season 2 (2002–03) ===
No. overall	No. in season	Title	Directed by	Written by	Original release date	US viewers (millions)
23	1	"The Enemy Walks In"	Ken Olin	J. J. Abrams	September 29, 2002	11.31
24	2	"Trust Me"	Craig Zisk	John Eisendrath	October 6, 2002	9.73
25	3	"Cipher"	Dan Attias	Alex Kurtzman & Roberto Orci	October 13, 2002	9.44
26	4	"Dead Drop"	Guy Bee	Jesse Alexander	October 20, 2002	10.08
27	5	"The Indicator"	Ken Olin	Jeff Pinkner	November 3, 2002	10.60
28	6	"Salvation"	Perry Lang	Alex Kurtzman & Roberto Orci	November 10, 2002	9.33
29	7	"The Counteragent"	Dan Attias	John Eisendrath	November 17, 2002	9.65
30	8	"Passage (Part 1)"	Ken Olin	Debra J. Fisher & Erica Messer	December 1, 2002	9.10
31	9	"Passage (Part 2)"	Ken Olin	Crystal Nix-Hines	December 8, 2002	9.21
32	10	"The Abduction"	Nelson McCormick	Alex Kurtzman & Roberto Orci	December 15, 2002	9.59
33	11	"A Higher Echelon"	Guy Bee	John Eisendrath	January 5, 2003	9.66
34	12	"The Getaway"	Lawrence Trilling	Jeff Pinkner	January 12, 2003	9.42
35	13	"Phase One"	Jack Bender	J. J. Abrams	January 26, 2003	17.36
36	14	"Double Agent"	Ken Olin	Alex Kurtzman & Roberto Orci	February 2, 2003	11.39
37	15	"A Free Agent"	Alex Kurtzman	Alex Kurtzman & Roberto Orci	February 9, 2003	10.28
38	16	"Firebomb"	Craig Zisk	John Eisendrath	February 23, 2003	8.61
39	17	"A Dark Turn"	Ken Olin	Jesse Alexander	March 2, 2003	10.69
40	18	"Truth Takes Time"	Nelson McCormick	J. R. Orci	March 16, 2003	9.66
41	19	"Endgame"	Perry Lang	Sean Gerace	March 30, 2003	9.89
42	20	"Countdown"	Lawrence Trilling	R. P. Gaborno & Jeff Pinkner	April 27, 2003	8.03
43	21	"Second Double"	Ken Olin	Story by : Breen Frazier; Teleplay by : Crystal Nix-Hines	May 4, 2003	10.10
44	22	"The Telling"	J. J. Abrams	J. J. Abrams	May 4, 2003	10.10

=== The Animated Alias: Tribunal (2004) ===
Jennifer Garner reprises her television role of CIA agent Sydney Bristow in this story that takes place between the second and third seasons of the live-action series. It is considered a "missing adventure" during a period Sydney later erases from her memory in which she works undercover as an assassin named "Julia Thorne." Despite how it was promoted in the teaser, the episode does not reveal anything that explains Sydney's missing time. It's merely a mission she undertook, and contains no background, or much information (not even about the mission portrayed). The events of this short are considered canonical with the live-action Alias series. This short film was originally produced for the DVD release of the third season as bonus feature.

=== Season 3 (2003–04) ===
No. overall	No. in season	Title	Directed by	Written by	Original release date	US viewers (millions)
45	1	"The Two"	Ken Olin	J. J. Abrams	September 28, 2003	9.73
46	2	"Succession"	Dan Attias	Alex Kurtzman & Roberto Orci	October 5, 2003	9.40
47	3	"Reunion"	Jack Bender	Jeff Pinkner	October 12, 2003	8.93
48	4	"A Missing Link"	Lawrence Trilling	Monica Breen & Alison Schapker	October 19, 2003	9.45
49	5	"Repercussions"	Ken Olin	Jesse Alexander	October 26, 2003	9.45
50	6	"The Nemesis"	Lawrence Trilling	Crystal Nix-Hines	November 2, 2003	8.92
51	7	"Prelude"	Jack Bender	J. R. Orci	November 9, 2003	9.26
52	8	"Breaking Point"	Dan Attias	Breen Frazier	November 23, 2003	8.48
53	9	"Conscious"	Ken Olin	Josh Appelbaum & André Nemec	November 30, 2003	9.16
54	10	"Remnants"	Jack Bender	Jeff Pinkner	December 7, 2003	8.61
55	11	"Full Disclosure"	Lawrence Trilling	Jesse Alexander	January 11, 2004	9.05
56	12	"Crossings"	Ken Olin	Josh Appelbaum & André Nemec	January 18, 2004	7.58
57	13	"After Six"	Maryann Brandon	Monica Breen & Alison Schapker	February 15, 2004	9.54
58	14	"Blowback"	Lawrence Trilling	Laurence Andries	March 7, 2004	7.39
59	15	"Façade"	Jack Bender	R. P. Gaborno and Christopher Hollier	March 14, 2004	7.43
60	16	"Taken"	Lawrence Trilling	J. R. Orci	March 21, 2004	7.93
61	17	"The Frame"	Max Mayer	Crystal Nix-Hines	March 28, 2004	8.80
62	18	"Unveiled"	Jack Bender	Monica Breen & Alison Schapker	April 11, 2004	8.47
63	19	"Hourglass"	Ken Olin	Josh Appelbaum & André Nemec	April 18, 2004	7.96
64	20	"Blood Ties"	Jack Bender	Story by : Monica Breen & Alison Schapker; Teleplay by : J. R. Orci	April 25, 2004	8.25
65	21	"Legacy"	Lawrence Trilling	Jesse Alexander	May 2, 2004	8.27
66	22	"Resurrection"	Ken Olin	Jeff Pinkner	May 23, 2004	7.65

=== Season 4 (2005) ===
No. overall	No. in season	Title	Directed by	Written by	Original release date	US viewers (millions)
67	1	"Authorized Personnel Only (Part 1)"	Ken Olin	J. J. Abrams & Jeff Melvoin	January 5, 2005	15.76
68	2	"Authorized Personnel Only (Part 2)"	Ken Olin	J. J. Abrams & Jeff Melvoin	January 5, 2005	15.76
69	3	"The Awful Truth"	Lawrence Trilling	Jesse Alexander	January 12, 2005	13.90
70	4	"Ice"	Jeffrey Bell	Jeffrey Bell	January 19, 2005	13.21
71	5	"Welcome to Liberty Village"	Kevin Hooks	Drew Goddard	January 26, 2005	11.68
72	6	"Nocturne"	Lawrence Trilling	Jeff Pinkner	February 9, 2005	10.80
73	7	"Détente"	Craig Zisk	Monica Breen & Alison Schapker	February 16, 2005	9.60
74	8	"Echoes"	Dan Attias	André Nemec & Josh Appelbaum	February 23, 2005	9.74
75	9	"A Man of His Word"	Marita Grabiak	Breen Frazier	March 2, 2005	9.69
76	10	"The Index"	Lawrence Trilling	J. R. Orci & Alison Schapker	March 9, 2005	9.80
77	11	"The Road Home"	Maryann Brandon	André Nemec & Josh Appelbaum	March 16, 2005	8.50
78	12	"The Orphan"	Ken Olin	Jeffrey Bell & Monica Breen	March 23, 2005	6.76
79	13	"Tuesday"	Frederick E. O. Toye	Drew Goddard & Breen Frazier	March 30, 2005	10.83
80	14	"Nightingale"	Lawrence Trilling	Breen Frazier	April 6, 2005	9.33
81	15	"Pandora"	Kevin Hooks	J. R. Orci & Jeff Pinkner	April 13, 2005	7.44
82	16	"Another Mister Sloane"	Greg Yaitanes	Luke McMullen	April 20, 2005	8.08
83	17	"A Clean Conscience"	Lawrence Trilling	J. R. Orci	April 27, 2005	8.19
84	18	"Mirage"	Brad Turner	Steven Kane	May 4, 2005	9.16
85	19	"In Dreams..."	Jennifer Garner	Jon Robin Baitz	May 11, 2005	9.84
86	20	"The Descent"	Jeffrey Bell	Jeffrey Bell	May 18, 2005	8.86
87	21	"Search and Rescue"	Lawrence Trilling	Monica Breen & Alison Schapker	May 18, 2005	8.86
88	22	"Before the Flood"	Lawrence Trilling	Josh Appelbaum & André Nemec	May 25, 2005	10.08

=== Season 5 (2005–06) ===
No. overall	No. in season	Title	Directed by	Written by	Original release date	US viewers (millions)
89	1	"Prophet Five"	Ken Olin	Alison Schapker & Monica Breen	September 29, 2005	8.21
90	2	"...1..."	Frederick E. O. Toye	J. R. Orci	October 6, 2005	7.39
91	3	"The Shed"	Tucker Gates	Breen Frazier	October 13, 2005	7.20
92	4	"Mockingbird"	Frederick E. O. Toye	Drew Goddard	October 20, 2005	6.78
93	5	"Out of the Box"	Jay Torres	Jesse Alexander	October 27, 2005	6.55
94	6	"Solo"	Jeffrey Bell	Jeffrey Bell	November 10, 2005	6.43
95	7	"Fait Accompli"	Richard Coad	Andi Bushell	November 17, 2005	6.48
96	8	"Bob"	Donald Thorin, Jr.	Monica Breen & Alison Schapker	December 7, 2005	6.40
97	9	"The Horizon"	Tucker Gates	Josh Appelbaum & André Nemec	December 14, 2005	5.64
98	10	"S.O.S."	Karen Gaviola	J. R. Orci	April 19, 2006	7.49
99	11	"Maternal Instinct"	Tucker Gates	Breen Frazier	April 19, 2006	7.49
100	12	"There's Only One Sydney Bristow"	Robert M. Williams, Jr.	Drew Goddard	April 26, 2006	6.43
101	13	"30 Seconds"	Frederick E. O. Toye	Alison Schapker & Monica Breen	May 3, 2006	5.33
102	14	"I See Dead People"	Jamie Babbit	Andi Bushell & J. R. Orci	May 10, 2006	6.08
103	15	"No Hard Feelings"	Tucker Gates	Sam Humphrey	May 17, 2006	5.43
104	16	"Reprisal"	Frederick E. O. Toye	Monica Breen & Alison Schapker	May 22, 2006	6.68
105	17	"All the Time in the World"	Tucker Gates	Drew Goddard & Jeff Pinkner	May 22, 2006	6.68
