= John E. Gallagher =

American television director (1958–2019)

- Born: February 15, 1958
- Died: March 2, 2019 (aged 61)
- Other names: John Gallagher; John E. Gallagher III
- Occupation: Television director
- Years active: 1986–2019

John E. Gallagher (February 15, 1958 - March 2, 2019; sometimes credited as John Gallagher and John E. Gallagher III) was an American television director. His credits include Third Watch, ER, The Good Wife, Criminal Minds and The Blacklist. Prior to working in television, he worked as an assistant director and production assistant on the films Friday the 13th Part VIII: Jason Takes Manhattan, Born on the Fourth of July, The Hard Way, Out for Justice, Stone Cold, Passenger 57 and other films.
