= Andrew S. Wilder =

Andrew S. Wilder is an American television writer and producer. He has written and co-produced several episodes of the TV show Criminal Minds. He is the writer and director of the film The Orphan King.

== Life ==
Wilder was born in New York City, New York. In 1996 USC Film School awarded him the Jack Nickelson Award for excellence in screen writing. He wrote six feature scripts for the major studios before turning to television writing.

Wilder was a writer for the 44 episodes during the first two seasons of Criminal Minds, and a writer/producer of 44 episodes in seasons three and four. He was the sole credited writer on nine episodes over the four seasons he was worked on the series. Andrew also wrote two TV pilots for Paramount Television Studios and CBS prior to joining Criminal Minds before the series debut in 2004. He has been an expert guest panelist and guest speaker with an active duty FBI profiler at The Cyril Wecht School for Forensic Science at Duquesne University in Pittsburgh, Boston College School of Forensic Nursing, and the Entertainment Industries Council in Washington D.C.
