= Simon Mirren =

British television writer and producer

Simon Mirren is a British television writer and producer. He is a nephew of the actress Helen Mirren.

== Career ==
Simon Mirren began his career writing for British series like medical drama Casualty, spy thriller Spooks and Waking the Dead. He then moved on to writing and producing for American series Without a Trace and Third Watch. He then became a producer and writer for the procedural Criminal Minds.

Mirren co-wrote and produced the television series Versailles, dramatising the life of Louis XIV of France. The first season of Versailles received mixed to positive reviews from critics. On 17 April 2018, Variety reported that the third season of Versailles would be its last. Mirren’s only full length written work feature film is the partially biographical G:MT – Greenwich Mean Time, which was released in 1999. As well as its soundtrack, the movie is notable for its cast of acclaimed actors early in their careers including Chiwetel Ejiofor, Steve John Shepherd and Alec Newman.
