= Alec Smight =

American film editor and television director

- Born: Alexander D. Smight; August 30, 1959 (age 65); New York City, New York, USA
- Occupation: Television Director & Film Editor
- Years active: 1987–present
- Parent: Jack Smight (father)
- Website: www.alecsmight.com

Alec Dow Smight is an American film editor and television director born on August 30, 1959, in New York City. He was a producer and director on the successful series CSI: Crime Scene Investigation and has directed two episodes of its spin-off CSI: Cyber. Son of the well-known television and film director Jack Smight, his editing work includes Chicago Hope, numerous television pilots, Northern Exposure, and L.A. Law.

== Career ==
In 2006 Smight segued into directing which also acted as his "CSI" debut with "The Unusual Suspect" which premiered on March 30, 2006. His second CSI episode "Burn Out" aired November 2, 2006. In July 2013 it was confirmed that he would direct the 300th episode of CSI titled "Frame by Frame" which aired on October 23, 2013.

During CSI's run Smight directed forty-two episodes of CSI, with his last being Season 15's "The End Game”". He directed two episodes in the second season of CSI: Cyber and an episode in the first season of Criminal Minds: Beyond Borders which stars former CSI: NY actor Gary Sinise.

== Filmography ==
| Year | Title | Notes |
|---|---|---|
| 2006–2015 | CSI: Crime Scene Investigation | 42 episodes |
| 2016 | CSI: Cyber | 2 episodes |
| 2016–2017 | Criminal Minds: Beyond Borders | 2 episodes |
| 2016–present | Criminal Minds | 4 episodes |

== Personal life ==
Born in New York City, Smight is the son of television director Jack Smight and actress Joyce Smight. Smight currently lives in California with his wife and three children.

== Awards ==
Smight has been nominated for three prime time Emmys, and three A.C.E. awards.
