= Breen Frazier =

American screenwriter

Breen Frazier is a freelance writer best known for his work on the television series Alias, which he began writing for during its second season. Additionally Frazier wrote an Alias prequel novel entitled Infiltration, as well as the animated short, Animated Alias: Tribunal, a story set between seasons two and three of Alias. Frazier also wrote the story for the 2004 video game, Alias.

Frazier was a writer and an executive producer for Criminal Minds.

== TV credits ==
=== Roswell ===
- 1.08 Blood Brother — November 24, 1999
- 2.11 To Serve and Protect — January 22, 2001
- 2.14 How the Other Half Lives — February 19, 2001

=== Alias ===
- 2.21 Second Double — May 4, 2003
- 3.08 Breaking Point — November 23, 2003
- 4.09 A Man of His Word — March 2, 2005
- 4.13 Tuesday March 30, 2005
- 4.14 Nightingale — April 6, 2005
- 5.03 The Shed — October 13, 2005
- 5.11 Maternal Instinct — April 19, 2006

=== Criminal Minds ===
- 4.09 52 Pickup – November 26, 2008
- 4.16 Pleasure Is My Business – February 25, 2009
- 5.05 Cradle to Grave – October 21, 2009
- 5.12 The Uncanny Valley – January 13, 2010
- 5.22 The Internet Is Forever – May 19, 2010
- 6.04 Compromising Positions – October 13, 2010
- 6.18 Lauren (Part 2) – March 16, 2011
- 6.23 Big Sea – May 11, 2011
- 7.04 Painless – October 12, 2011
- 7.12 Unknown Subject – January 25, 2012
- 7.20 The Company – April 11, 2012
- 8.04 God Complex – October 24, 2012
- 8.12 Zugzwang – January 16, 2013
- 8.22 #6 – May 15, 2013
- 9.02 The Inspired (Part 2) – October 2, 2013
- 9.12 The Black Queen – January 15, 2014
- 9.20 Blood Relations – April 2, 2014
- 9.23 Angels (Part 1) – May 7, 2014
- 10.04 The Itch – October 22, 2014
- 10.11 The Forever People – January 14, 2015
- 10.21 Mr. Scratch – April 22, 2015
- 11.01 The Job – September 30, 2015
- 11.11 Entropy – January 13, 2016
- 11.16 Derek – March 2, 2016
- 11.22 The Storm – May 4, 2016
- 12.01 The Crimson King – September 28, 2016
- 12.07 Mirror Image – November 16, 2016
- 12.22 Red Light (Part 2) – May 10, 2017
- 13.01 Wheels Up (Part 3) – September 27, 2017
- 13.09 False Flag – December 6, 2017
- 13.22 Believer (Part 1) – April 18, 2018
- 14.04 The Tall Man – October 31, 2018
- 14.13 Chameleon – January 23, 2019
- 15.04 Saturday – January 22, 2020
- 15.06 Date Night – February 5, 2020
- 16.02 Sicarius – November 24, 2022
- 16.09 Memento Mori – February 2, 2023
- 17.05 Conspiracy vs. Theory – June 27, 2024
- 17.10 Save the Children – August 1, 2024
- 18.01 Swimmer's Calculus – May 8, 2025
- 18.09 CollateRal – July 3, 2025
- 19.02 Cluster – May 28, 2026
- 19.09 Badder Blood – July 16, 2026

== Other credits ==
- Animated Alias: Tribunal — (2003)
- Infiltration: Alias prequel 9 — (2004)
- Alias - The video game (2004)
