= Glenn Kershaw =

American television writer, director, and producer

Glenn Kershaw is an American television writer, director, and producer known for his directorial works on American Television series, including Third Watch, Criminal Minds, and Army Wives.

== Filmography ==
=== As producer ===
- Somewhere, Tomorrow (1983)
- Twisted (1986)
- The Night Train to Kathmandu (1988)
- Third Watch (2001-2005)
- Criminal Minds (2006 - 2020)
- Home Burial (2013)
- 98% Human (2017)

=== As director ===
==== Army Wives ====
- Rules of Engagement (2007)
- First Response (2009)
- Hearts & Minds (2010)
- Handicap (2012)

==== Criminal Minds ====
- 2.12 Profiler, Profiled - December 13, 2006
- 2.22 Legacy - May 9, 2007
- 3.13 Limelight - January 23, 2008
- 3.20 Lo-Fi - May 21, 2008
- 4.02 The Angel Maker - October 1, 2008
- 4.10 Brothers in Arms - December 10, 2008
- 5.06 The Eyes Have It - November 4, 2009
- 5.22 The Internet Is Forever - May 19, 2010
- 6.03 Remembrance of Things Past - October 6, 2010
- 6.09 Into the Woods - November 17, 2010
- 6.23 Big Sea - May 11, 2011
- 7.01 It Takes a Village - September 21, 2011
- 7.11 True Genius - January 18, 2012
- 7.24 Run - May 16, 2012
- 8.01 The Silencer - September 26, 2012
- 8.13 Magnum Opus - January 23, 2013
- 8.24 The Replicator - May 22, 2013
- 9.01 The Inspiration - September 25, 2013
- 9.11 Bully - December 11, 2013
- 9.24 Demons - May 14, 2014
- 10.01 X - October 1, 2014
- 10.13 Nelson's Sparrow - January 28, 2015
- 10.19 Beyond Borders - April 8, 2015
- 10.23 The Hunt - May 6, 2015
- 11.01 The Job - September 30, 2015
- 11.07 Target Rich - November 11, 2015
- 11.22 The Storm - May 4, 2016
- 12.01 The Crimson King - September 28, 2016
- 12.13 Spencer - February 15, 2017
- 12.22 Red Light - May 10, 2017
- 13.01 Wheels Up - September 27, 2017
- 13.13 Cure - January 24, 2018
- 13.22 Believer - April 18, 2018
- 14.01 300 - October 3, 2018
- 14.10 Flesh and Blood - December 12, 2018
- 14.15 Truth or Dare - February 6, 2019
- 15.10 And in the End - February 19, 2020

=== As director of photography ===
- Somewhere, Tomorrow (1983)
- Anna to the Infinite Power (1983)
- The Night Train to Kathmandu (1988)
- Fatal Skies (1990)
- Almost Pregnant (1992)
- Death Ring (1992)
- The Last Job (1993)
- Body of Influence (1993)
- Shootfighter: Fight to the Death (1993)
- Sins of the Night (1993)
- Working Stiffs (1994)
- Horses and Champions (1994)
- A Kiss Goodnight (1994)
- Two Guys Talkin' About Girls (1996)
- Exiled (1998)

==== Oz (1998) - 8 episodes ====
- The Tip
- Ancient Tribes
- Great Men
- Losing Your Appeal
- Family Bizness
- Strange Bedfellows
- Animal Farm
- Escape from Oz

==== Trinity (1998 - 1999) - 9 episodes ====
- Pilot (1998)
- In a Yellow Wood (1998)
- No Secrets (1998)
- In Loco Parentis (1998)
- ...To Forgive, Divine (1998)
- Hang Man Down (1998)
- Having Trouble with the Language (1999)
- Breaking In, Breaking Out, Breaking Up, Breaking Down (1999)
- Patron Saint of Impossible Causes (1999)

==== New York Undercover (1996 - 1999) - 44 episodes ====
- Catharsis (1999)
- The Troubles (1998)
- Going Native (1998)
- Sign o' the Times (1998)
- The Unusual Suspects (1998)
- Capital Punishment (1998)
- Quid Pro Quo (1998)
- Rat Trap (1998)
- Mob Street (1998)
- Spare Parts (1998)
- Pipeline (1998)
- Drop Dead Gorgeous (1998)
- Change, Change, Change (1998)
- The Last Hurrah (1997)
- No Place Like Hell (1997)
- Hubris (1997)
- Descell (1997)
- The Promised Land (1997)
- Outrage (1997)
- School's Out (1997)
- The Solomon Papers (1997)
- Fade Out (1997)
- Grim Reaper (1997)
- Brown Like Me (1996)
- Going Platinum (1996)
- Without Mercy (1996)
- Don't Blink (1996)
- Smack Is Back (1996)
- Kill the Noise (1996)
- Rule of Engagement (1996)
- Blue Boy (1996)
- Tough Love (1996)
- A Time of Faith: Part 2 (1996)
- A Time of Faith: Part 1 (1996)
- If This World Were Mine (1996)
- Deep Cover (1996)
- No Greater Love (1996)
- Andre's Choice (1996)
- The Enforcers (1996)
- The Reckoning (1996)
- Unis (1996)
- Checkmate (1996)
- Sympathy for the Devil (1996)
- Toy Soldiers (1996)

==== Criminal Minds (2005 - 2010) - 24 episodes ====
- 1.02 Compulsion - September 28, 2005
- 1.03 Won't Get Fooled Again - October 5, 2005
- 1.04 Plain Sight - October 12, 2005
- 1.05 Broken Mirror - October 19, 2005
- 1.06 L.D.S.K. - November 2, 2005
- 1.07 The Fox - November 9, 2005
- 1.08 Natural Born Killer - November 16, 2005
- 1.09 Derailed - November 23, 2005
- 1.10 The Popular Kids - November 30, 2005
- 1.11 Blood Hungry - December 14, 2005
- 1.12 What Fresh Hell? - January 11, 2006
- 1.13 Poison - January 18, 2006
- 1.14 Riding the Lightning - January 25, 2006
- 1.15 Unfinished Business - March 1, 2006
- 1.16 The Tribe - March 8, 2006
- 1.17 A Real Rain - March 22, 2006
- 1.18 Somebody's Watching - March 29, 2006
- 1.19 Machismo - April 12, 2006
- 1.20 Charm and Harm - April 19, 2006
- 1.21 Secrets and Lies - May 3, 2006
- 1.22 The Fisher King: Part 1 - May 10, 2006
- 2.01 The Fisher King: Part 2 - September 20, 2006
- 5.17 Solitary Man - March 10, 2010
- 5.19 Rite of Passage - April 14, 2010

==== QuickBites (2011) - 1 episode ====
- Sack Lunch (2011)
