= Bruce Zimmerman =

American novelist (born 1952)

Bruce Zimmerman (born 11 June 1952) is an American novelist, screenwriter, and television producer. Among the television series he has worked on are Criminal Minds, Desperate Housewives, CSI: NY, K-Ville, The District, Judging Amy, Reunion, So Weird, Street Time and Deputy. He has also written a number of movies for television, including the two "Inspectors" movies for Showtime.

Born in Sacramento, California, Zimmerman began his writing career while living in San Miguel de Allende, Guanajuato, a small colonial town in the mountains of Central Mexico. He published four suspense novels featuring Quinn Parker, a therapist who specializes in treating phobias: Blood Under the Bridge (1989), Thicker Than Water (1991), Full-Bodied Red (1993) and Crimson Green (1994).

In 2011, he joined the writing staff of Criminal Minds, for which he has written eleven episodes so far, and now holds the rank of a co-executive producer.
