= Rob Bailey (director) =

American television director

Rob Bailey is an English television director. He has directed episodes of The Wire, CSI: Crime Scene Investigation, Criminal Minds and Without a Trace. He is a producer and regular director for CSI: NY. For The Wire he directed the tenth episode of the second season, "Storm Warnings", in 2003. He returned in 2004 to direct the third episode of the third season, "Dead Soldiers".

== Filmography ==
- The Right Stuff (2020)
  - Episode 1.05 "The Kona Kai Seance"
- Prodigal Son (2019)
  - Episode 1.03 "Fear Response"
- Pennyworth (2019–20)
  - Episode 1.05 “Shirley Bassey”
  - Episode 1.09 “Alma Cogan“
  - Episode 2.03 "The Belt and Welt"
  - Episode 2.04 "The Hunted Fox"
  - Episode 2.09 "Paradise Lost"
  - Episode 2.10 "The Lion and Lamb"
- Whiskey Cavalier (2019)
  - Episode 1.11 "College Confidential"
- Gotham (2014–19)
  - Episode 5.12 "The Beginning"
  - Episode 5.03 "Penguin, Our Hero"
  - Episode 4.21 "One Bad Guy"
  - Episode 4.08 "Stop Hitting Yourself"
  - Episode 3.22 "Heavydirtysoul"
  - Episode 3.08 "Blood Rush"
  - Episode 3.03 "Look Into My Eyes"
  - Episode 2.21 "A Legion of Horribles"
  - Episode 2.10 "The Son of Gotham"
  - Episode 2.02 "Knock, Knock"
  - Episode 1.07 "Penguin's Umbrella"
- Grimm (2012–15)
  - Episode 1.15 "Island of Dreams"
  - Episode 2.06 "Over My Dead Body"
  - Episode 3.12 "The Wild Hunt"
  - Episode 4.16 "Heartbreaker"
- Ringer (2011)
  - Episode 1.01 "She's Ruining Everything"
- Treme (2011)
  - Episode 2.05 "Slip Away"
- CSI: NY
- The Wire (2002)
  - Episode 2.10 "Storm Warnings" (2003)
  - Episode 3.03 "Dead Soldiers" (2004)
- CSI: Crime Scene Investigation
- Criminal Minds
  - Episode 8.06 "The Apprenticeship"
  - Episode 8.23 "Brothers Hotchner"
  - Episode 9.04 "To Bear Witness"
  - Episode 9.10 "The Caller"
  - Episode 9.23 "Angels"
  - Episode 10.03 "A Thousand Suns"
  - Episode 10.09 "Fate"
  - Episode 11.15 "A Badge and a Gun"
  - Episode 12.09 "Profiling 202"
  - Episode 12.15 "Alpha Male"
  - Episode 13.10 "Submerged"
  - Episode 13.15 "Annihilator"
  - Episode 14.14 "Sick and Evil"
- Criminal Minds: Beyond Borders (2016)
  - Episode 1.02 "Harvested"
