= Criminal Minds season 18 =

Season of television series Criminal Minds

Criminal Minds: Evolution
- Season 18
- Starring: Joe Mantegna; A. J. Cook; Kirsten Vangsness; Aisha Tyler; Zach Gilford; RJ Hatanaka; Adam Rodriguez; Paget Brewster
- No. of episodes: 10

Release
- Original network: Paramount+
- Original release: May 8 – July 10, 2025

Season chronology
- ← Previous; Season 17 Next → Season 19

The eighteenth season of the American police procedural crime drama television series Criminal Minds, now subtitled Evolution, follows members of the Behavioral Analysis Unit (BAU) as they are faced with a network of serial killers built during the COVID-19 pandemic. The season serves as a third season revival of the series after its original run on CBS ended five years earlier.

The season premiered on May 8, 2025 on Paramount+ in the U.S. and on Disney+ in other regions on June 10, 2025.

== Cast ==
The eighteenth season of Criminal Minds will see the return of every main character from the seventeenth season, including the multi-season suspect Elias Voit.

In January 2024, Josh Stewart announced that he would not return to the show after first appearing as William LaMontagne Jr. in the second season of the show in 2007. Showrunner Erica Messer revealed that the final scene featuring Stewart's character was shot "several seasons ago, long before Stewart's decision to exit the show." Stewart was not credited in episodes 2 and 3 for his appearances.

Many fans have been anticipating and pushing for the return of Spencer Reid, an original character of the series played by Matthew Gray Gubler who last appeared in the fifteenth season. The showrunner, Erica Messer, along with Gubler have both emphasized a willingness for Spencer Reid to return, yet it is unclear if and when that may occur due to scheduling conflicts. He was confirmed to reprise his role in one episode of this season, and returned in the third episode, "Time to Say Goodbye". Aimee Garcia recurred throughout the season as Dr. Julia Ochoa.

=== Main ===
- Joe Mantegna as David Rossi
- A. J. Cook as Jennifer "JJ" Jareau
- Kirsten Vangsness as Penelope Garcia
- Aisha Tyler as Dr. Tara Lewis
- RJ Hatanaka as Tyler Green
- Zach Gilford as Elias Voit
- Adam Rodriguez as Luke Alvez
- Paget Brewster as Emily Prentiss

=== Recurring ===
- Nicole Pacent as Rebecca Wilson
- Aimee Garcia as Dr. Julia Ochoa
- Geoff Stults as Evan Delray
- Ariel Jackson as Nurse Monica Luna

=== Guest ===
- Josh Stewart as Will LaMontagne Jr. (uncredited)
- Matthew Gray Gubler as Dr. Spencer Reid
- Linda Lavin as Connie LaMontagne
- Candy Clark as Sandy Jareau
- Kerry Knuppe as Ramona Havener
- LaTanya Richardson Jackson as Caroline Lewis
- Silas Weir Mitchell as Cyrus Lebrun
- Aaron Stanford as Kyle Mackey
- Mekhai Allan Andersen as Henry LaMontagne
- Phoenix Andersen as Michael LaMontagne

== Episodes ==
No. overall	No. in season	Title	Directed by	Written by	Original release date
345	1	"Swimmer's Calculus"	Bethany Rooney	Breen Frazier	May 8, 2025
When a body washes up on shore in Ocean City, Maryland, the BAU investigates it and four other drowning murders on the East Shore. Rossi is questioned over the prison attack that left Voit comatose.
346	2	"The Zookeeper"	Aisha Tyler	Christopher Barbour	May 15, 2025
Voit wakes up from his coma, seemingly with severe amnesia. A dormant member of the Sicarius network, known by "The Zookeeper", reappears with another victim held captive.
347	3	"Time to Say Goodbye"	Joe Mantegna	Erica Messer	May 22, 2025
The team mourns LaMontagne following his death from an aneurysm. Alvez and Green visit Ramona Havener, Voit's only known survivor, to see if they can find a way to unlock his memory.
348	4	"I'm Fine, It's Fine. Everything Is Fine"	Anthony Vietro	Jayne A. Archer	May 29, 2025
The team investigates a pair of murders in Tucson, Arizona believed to be connected to organ trafficking. JJ discovers a video posted on the former BAU-gate website that shows a masked member of Voit's network.
349	5	"The Brutal Man"	Nelson McCormick	Sullivan Fitzgerald	June 5, 2025
JJ assists Dr. Ochoa in helping Voit deal with his troubled past, and informs him that a follower received a message from an unknown person who seems to be uniting the surviving members of Voit's killer network.
350	6	"Hell Is Empty..."	Jackeline Tejada	Charles Dewey	June 12, 2025
The BAU enlists Voit's help to find a Warrenton, Virginia member of the Sicarius network who buries his victims alive. Federal prosecutor and Rebecca's ex Evan Delray arrives to investigate another unsub's suicide.
351	7	"...All the Devils Are Here"	A. J. Cook	Carlton William Gillespie	June 19, 2025
Voit works with the BAU to stop a pair of network unsubs who are killing victims and attempting to get Voit to revert to his murderous ways. The team also learns Evan Delray has been appointed as Voit's liaison.
352	8	"Tara"	Sharat Raju	Chikodili Agwuna	June 26, 2025
Having been shot the previous episode, Tara experiences visions of her late mother while undergoing surgery. The other members of the BAU search for her shooter and the network's new head, dubbed The Disciple.
353	9	"Col1ateRal"	Doug Aarniokoski	Breen Frazier	July 3, 2025
A network unsub, the Engineer, kidnaps a young boy and sends him to the BAU with a message. Voit's behavior puts the investigation at risk of failure, but both he and the BAU are unaware the Engineer is working at the hospital Voit is in.
354	10	"The Disciple"	Glenn Kershaw	Christopher Barbour	July 10, 2025
The Disciple and the Engineer kidnap Voit and Ochoa and attempt to have Voit return to his murderous ways. The BAU works to locate and apprehend them as well as shut the Sicarius network down for good.

== Release ==
The season premiered on May 8, 2025, and consisted of ten episodes.
