= Criminal Minds season 17 =

Season of television series Criminal Minds

Criminal Minds: Evolution
- Season 17
- Season 17 U.S. DVD cover
- Starring: Joe Mantegna; A. J. Cook; Kirsten Vangsness; Aisha Tyler; Zach Gilford; Ryan-James Hatanaka; Adam Rodriguez; Paget Brewster
- No. of episodes: 10

Release
- Original network: Paramount+
- Original release: June 6 – August 1, 2024

Season chronology
- ← Previous; Season 16 Next → Season 18

The seventeenth season of the American police procedural crime drama television series Criminal Minds, now subtitled Evolution, follows members of the Behavioral Analysis Unit (BAU) as they are faced with a network of serial killers built during the COVID-19 pandemic. The season serves as a second season revival of the series after its original run on CBS ended four years earlier.

The season premiered on June 5, 2024 on Paramount+ in the U.S. and on Disney+ in other regions on June 7, 2024. The season's story arc follows members of the Behavioral Analysis Unit (BAU) as they investigate the mystery of "Gold Star", however, they are forced to work with Elias Voit when he "negotiates a deal that transfers him to federal custody, in the BAU's own backyard".

One day prior to the premiere of season seventeen, Criminal Minds: Evolution was renewed for an eighteenth season.

== Cast ==
=== Main ===
- Joe Mantegna as David Rossi
- A. J. Cook as Jennifer "JJ" Jareau
- Kirsten Vangsness as Penelope Garcia
- Aisha Tyler as Dr. Tara Lewis
- Zach Gilford as Elias Voit
- Ryan-James Hatanaka as Tyler Green
- Adam Rodriguez as Luke Alvez
- Paget Brewster as Emily Prentiss

=== Recurring ===
- Nicole Pacent as Rebecca Wilson
- Brian J. White as Vincent Orlov
- Paul F. Tompkins as Brian Garrity
- Kiele Sanchez as Sydney Voit
- Liana Liberato as Jade Waters
- David Garelik as Damien Booth
- Felicity Huffman as Dr. Jill Gideon

=== Guest ===
- Clark Gregg as FBI Director Ray Madison
- Tuc Watkins as Frank Church
- Nicholas D'Agosto as Deputy Director Doug Bailey
- Alex Saxon as Pete Bailey

== Episodes ==
| No. overall | No. in season | Title | Directed by | Written by | Original release date |
|---|---|---|---|---|---|
| 335 | 1 | "Gold Star" | Doug Aarniokoski | Erica Messer | June 6, 2024 |
Two weeks after the events of last season's finale, a Bristow, Virginia police officer's wife is murdered. The BAU connects the case to Gold Star, an unsub who removes their victim's eyes and leaves bullets with star markings on them. They discover the DOJ has been consulting with Elias Voit. After the police officer commits suicide during questioning, the BAU calls Tyler Green to help them with the case.
| 336 | 2 | "Contagion" | A. J. Cook | Matthew Lau | June 6, 2024 |
Forced to work with Voit, JJ attempts to trick him into incriminating himself as Sicarius. Rossi and Prentiss investigate after two teachers in Provo, Utah are killed with a similar MO to Gold Star. Lewis and Tyler perform a stake-out but are joined by Tara's DOJ ex-girlfriend Rebecca.
| 337 | 3 | "Homesick" | Adam Rodriguez | Sullivan Fitzgerald & Carlton Gillespie | June 13, 2024 |
The BAU has become the subject of conspiracy theories due to Doug Bailey's death the previous season. While JJ and Alvez attempt to convince Voit's wife to speak with him, Rossi and Lewis investigate a serial killer in Houston, Texas who has been dubbed "The Moving Day Killer".
| 338 | 4 | "Kingdom of the Blind" | Joe Mantegna | Chikodili Agwuna & Jayne A. Archer | June 20, 2024 |
The BAU is faced with more Gold Star killing with the same gruesome M.O. in Jackpot, Nevada. Elias Voit says goodbye to his family. Prentiss wrestles with the fallout of her run-in with Brian Garrity. Garcia hacks the cloned phone brought in by Tyler Green.
| 339 | 5 | "Conspiracy vs. Theory" | Sharat Raju | Breen Frazier | June 27, 2024 |
Using Elias Voit, the BAU arranges a meeting with Gold Star in Davenport, Iowa, but the situation turns for the worse when they send a hostage with a bomb strapped to him.
| 340 | 6 | "Message in a Bottle" | Nelson McCormick | Carlton Gillespie & Sullivan Fitzgerald | July 4, 2024 |
Alvez and Garcia profile who might be targeting Tyler's ex-girlfriend. JJ helps Prentiss work through an existential hangover. When Rossi's Voit delusions reach a breaking point, Rossi confronts Voit and unpack what has truly been haunting him.
| 341 | 7 | "Piranha" | Aisha Tyler | Chikodili Agwuna & Jayne A. Archer | July 11, 2024 |
The BAU pursues an UnSub in Bethesda, Maryland who kills his victims with acid. Prentiss and Rossi dive into the BAU's history to find connections to Gold Star. Prentiss reaches out to Jason Gideon's ex-wife Jill. Voit utilizes his lawyer to reach out to Damien.
| 342 | 8 | "North Star" | Zach Gilford | Charles Dewey & Christopher Barbour | July 18, 2024 |
The BAU tries to get ahead of the two UnSubs, Jade Waters and Damien Booth, who are on a killing spree. Rossi must confront Jill to unpack the secrets behind the Gold Star program. Tyler and Rebecca attempt to gain leverage over Elias Voit's lawyer.
| 343 | 9 | "Stars & Stripes" | Bethany Rooney | Christopher Barbour | July 25, 2024 |
With Jade on the run, the BAU continues to assemble the pieces connecting Gold Star victims to Aida Limited. Jade and Dana follow Voit’s breadcrumbs to the heart of the “conspiracy.” A search warrant execution by the BAU has deadly consequences.
| 344 | 10 | "Save the Children" | Glenn Kershaw | Breen Frazier | August 1, 2024 |
When the identity of the last Gold Star member is revealed, the pieces of the puzzle click together. Prentiss, now in mortal danger, must confront Jade and her accomplice to expose the truth behind the “conspiracy” before time runs out for the BAU.

== Production ==
=== Development ===
The seventeenth season of Criminal Minds was announced on January 12, 2023. It is marketed by Paramount+ as the "second season" of Criminal Minds: Evolution; which was originally announced as a revival series.

The first two episodes of the new season was released on June 6, followed by weekly releases. The new season premiered on June 7, 2024 on Disney+ in Canada.

=== Casting ===
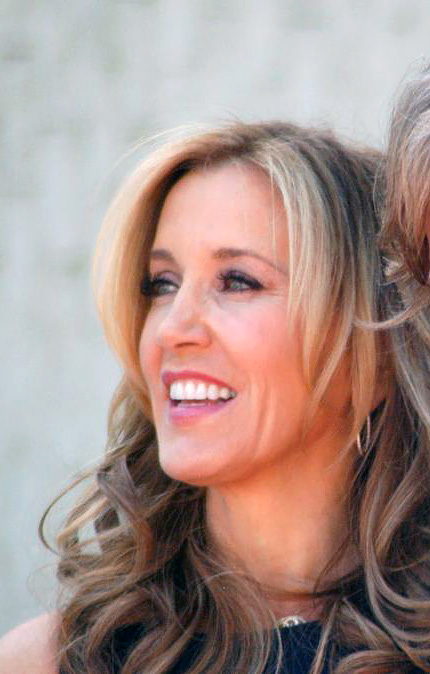
Felicity Huffman will guest star as Dr. Jill Gideon (the ex-wife of Jason Gideon) this season

The entire main cast from the previous season will return, with the additions of Ryan-James Hatanaka as Tyler Green and Zach Gilford as Elias Voit who were promoted to series regulars this season, after recurring in the previous season.

On January 17, 2024, Josh Stewart revealed that after 16 years, he will not reprise his role as Will LaMontagne Jr. this season, stating that his "days of playing Will LaMontagne Jr. are over."

Fans have speculated that Matthew Gray Gubler, the actor of Spencer Reid, may be returning to the show, having not been present in the previous season due to scheduling conflicts. On September 29, 2023, Gubler expressed his willingness to return.

In April, it was announced that Felicity Huffman would guest-star as Dr. Jill Gideon, the ex-wife of Jason Gideon. On May 10, 2024, it was announced that Clark Gregg, Brian J. White and Tuc Watkins will be recurring throughout the season as FBI Director Ray Madison, Vincent Orlov and Frank Church, respectively. Paul F. Tompkins will reprise his role from season 15 as Brian Garrity.

=== Filming ===
Filming and production for the seventeenth season of Criminal Minds officially commenced on January 18, 2024. Filming wrapped on May 10, 2024. Cast members Joe Mantegna, Aisha Tyler, A. J. Cook, Adam Rodriguez and Zach Gilford will be directing episodes this season
