= David Rossi =

Character in American television series Criminal Minds

- Criminal Minds character
- Joe Mantegna as David Rossi
- First appearance: "About Face"; 3x06, October 31, 2007 (on Criminal Minds) "The Harmful One"; 1x01, March 16, 2016 (on Criminal Minds: Beyond Borders)
- Created by: Edward Allen Bernero
- Portrayed by: Joe Mantegna (Original); Robert Dunne (Young)
- Other appearances: Criminal Minds: Beyond Borders

In-universe information
- Nicknames: Rossi, Dave, The Italian, Papa Pasta, Papa Rossi, Stallion the Italian
- Gender: Male
- Title(s): FBI BAU Supervisory Special Agent; FBI BAU Former Unit Chief (replaced)
- Occupation: FBI Special Agent; USMC Sergeant Major (retired)
- Family: Sal (uncle; deceased); Rosie (aunt; deceased); Kai Struthers (grandson); Shawn Struthers (son-in-law) Joy Rossi (daughter)
- Spouses: Krystall Richards (wife; deceased); Hayden Montgomery (ex-wife; 1 daughter and 1 grandson); Carolyn Rossi (ex-wife; 1 son; deceased)
- Children: James David Rossi (son, with Carolyn; deceased); Joy Struthers (daughter, with Hayden); Portia Richards (stepdaughter)
- Nationality: Italian-American
- Seasons: 3, 4, 5, 6, 7, 8, 9, 10, 11, 12, 13, 14, 15, 16, 17, 18, 19

David Stephen Rossi is a fictional character in the CBS crime drama Criminal Minds, portrayed by Joe Mantegna. He is a Supervisory Special Agent in the FBI's Behavioral Analysis Unit, and has appeared from the episode "About Face", which was originally broadcast on October 31, 2007, during the show's third season. He is also portrayed as a younger man by Robert Dunne, in flashbacks as a Marine infantry private in Vietnam in 1969 and in his earlier years with the BAU in 1978.

Rossi begins the series returning to the FBI after a lengthy period of being semi-retired, with his return due to "unfinished business". He is shown to be a close friend and colleague of Aaron Hotchner (Thomas Gibson), as they worked together during the early days of the Behavioral Analysis Unit. Rossi is also a writer and one of the team's senior and most decorated profilers. He replaced Jason Gideon, who was written out following Mandy Patinkin's abrupt departure from the series.

Mantegna has stated in an interview that the character was named after one of the policemen who had testified at the O. J. Simpson trial. Rossi's middle name, Stephen, is revealed in a flashback near the end of the tenth season episode, "Nelson's Sparrow".

== Storylines ==
=== Backstory ===
Rossi was born and raised on Long Island, New York, in the town of Commack.^{E503} As a child, he was friends with a young Emma Taylor, whom he refers to as the "one who got away". He was also close with Ray Finnegan (William Sadler), who eventually grew up to be a prominent local mobster. Rossi, however, avoided the lure of organized crime, and enlisted in the Marine Corps. He also admits in season 9, while interrogating a suspect, that when he was a teenager, he stuffed a Black teammate on his baseball team into a locker and urinated on him because of peer pressure from his other, white teammates. He says he has felt ashamed of it ever since, and that he considers it the worst thing he ever did.

Details of his military service are sketchy, as Rossi rarely talks about it. He served in the Vietnam War and rose to the rank of sergeant major before retiring from the Marine Corps; based on the backstory timelines, specifically the time in service required to rise to the rank of sergeant major and retire, he presumably served in the Marine Corps Reserve after joining the FBI.^{E703} In the Season 8 episode "The Fallen", Rossi encounters his old unit commander, Sgt. Harrison Scott (Meshach Taylor), who has since become a homeless alcoholic living on the streets of Santa Monica, California. Through flashbacks, it is shown that Scott had saved Rossi's life in Vietnam when Rossi froze at an oncoming Viet Cong soldier. It is implied that they both served in the 1st Marine Division.

After being discharged from active duty, he was recruited by the FBI. He subsequently cut most ties with his former life, not even returning to Commack for Emma's funeral in early 2009. Rossi has had an illustrious FBI career and enjoys a sterling reputation, even outside the BAU confines. He claims to have "written the book" on hostage negotiation, and in one episode steps in as a negotiator when his fellow agents Spencer Reid (Matthew Gray Gubler) and Emily Prentiss (Paget Brewster) are being held hostage.^{E403} He takes an annual leave to do cross-country lecture and book-signing tours, which apparently attract a lot of female fans, "if Barry Manilow isn't in town."^{E402}^{E415} He had worked with Hotchner prior to his initial retirement from the Bureau. To date Rossi has been married three times, but he has said the only people he knows how to make happy are "divorce lawyers".^{E318}

In season seven, he reconnects with his first wife, Carolyn (Isabella Hofmann), who tells him she is dying of amyotrophic lateral sclerosis and asks him to help her end her suffering. After some deliberation, he tells her he cannot bring himself to help her commit suicide, only to find that she has already taken an overdose of her medication. As she dies in his arms, she asks, "Do you think he'll be there?" Rossi replies, "I know he will." At the end of the episode, the "he" in question is revealed to be their son James, who died moments after being born, and whom Rossi buries her next to.

In season 9, it is revealed that his second wife, Hayden Montgomery (Sheryl Lee Ralph), is African American, and later in season 10 he discovers she was pregnant when they divorced, and that he has a daughter, Joy (Amber Stevens), and a grandson.

Rossi has a romantic relationship with BAU Bureau Chief Erin Strauss (Jayne Atkinson), hinted at throughout the series starting late in season 7. The full details of the affair are never disclosed, but he reveals his feelings for her when she is murdered by serial killer John Curtis (Mark Hamill), aka "The Replicator"; upon learning of her death, the usually unflappable Rossi becomes deeply emotional. At the end of the season, he kills Curtis to save his fellow agents' lives, thus avenging Strauss' murder.

Despite growing up on Long Island, Rossi is apparently a Chicago Cubs fan, judging by the Cubs gear in his Quantico office.^{E319}

It is hinted that he plays video games, as BAU Technical Analyst Penelope Garcia (Kirsten Vangsness) mentions a report of an abducted child named "Niko Bellic", who Rossi points out to be a character from Grand Theft Auto IV. Also, in a season 8 episode, Rossi shows familiarity with the game "Gods of Combat", a fictionalized PC game which corrupts the minds of several young murder suspects.

=== Personality ===
In contrast to Hotchner and Gideon, Rossi is decisively extroverted, abrasive, and much less cerebral, though still highly intelligent and disciplined. In one episode, Prentiss describes him as a "fussy, anal-retentive neat-freak who never leaves anything out of place", even color-coding his notes (blue pen for evidentiary items, red pen for supposition and theory).^{E314} He seems to favor less polished, more traditional police methods in profiling and interrogation - for example, he has no idea what a PDA is.^{E314} Nevertheless, he, Reid, and Gideon are the only characters who are known for being prolific writers. In later episodes, it is implied that he is more technically savvy than he was when first seen - in "Epilogue", he attributes his tiredness to a long session of Rock Band and not enough coffee the night before, but he also claims to have "wiped the floor" with Ringo Starr in the process, apparently on a high difficulty level.

Rossi is apparently something of a playboy, judging by what Agent Jennifer "JJ" Jareau (A.J. Cook) says to Garcia: "From what I hear, Rossi is the reason most of these fraternization rules even exist." On one occasion he has come into a team meeting late and with an undone tie, leading colleague Derek Morgan (Shemar Moore) to ask if he is "working on wife number four". Rossi responds "I see you people way too much."

It is implied that Rossi is quite wealthy. At times, he has deliberately flaunted his financial security to his superiors - for example, mentioning to Strauss during an interrogation session his grievances about how the price of gold is going up, and having to figure out when to sell. His wealth is also indicated by Rossi's favorite type of shoe (Italian suede), and an Italian Renaissance artwork he has in his office. In one episode, he also gives a young Catholic girl a check for $500 when she takes her First Holy Communion. In "Zoe's Reprise", he secretly pays for a young girl's funeral who was a fan of his books and was murdered the night she met Rossi. Also in season seven, Rossi makes his wealth apparent when the team coerces him to bankroll a sting at a poker tournament rather than going through FBI channels for funding. In another episode, Rossi believes that a suspect's monogrammed shirt is a clue to his real name; he states that such shirts are expensive, adding "trust me." At the end of season 7, Rossi hosts a lavish party at his house, where he later hosts Jareau and William LaMontagne, Jr.'s (Josh Stewart) wedding.

=== On the job ===
Rossi was in early retirement until his voluntary return to the BAU in 2007, replacing Jason Gideon (Mandy Patinkin). Rossi had retired in order to write books and go on lecture tours, but he returned to "settle some unfinished business". As he had served in an early form of the BAU, it was initially hard for Rossi to acclimate to the current team structure, but he eventually adjusted.

Rossi revealed to a local sheriff his reason for returning to the BAU, holding out a charm bracelet with the names of three children from one of his first cases.^{E314} The children had found their parents bludgeoned to death in the family home with an axe. After going unsolved for 20 years, the case found that a mentally disabled carny clown had committed the murders accidentally when he broke into the house to play with the oldest daughter. The father had surprised the man in the parents' bedroom and triggered the resulting attacks.^{E314} After the murders, Rossi had purchased the family's home to assist the children's grandmother, who was raising them following their parents' death. Rossi returned the house to the children, with the request that they use the proceeds to better their lives.

In "Hanley Waters", as he is being interviewed about Prentiss' "apparent death" by Hotchner instead of Strauss, he reveals that he feels more married to his job than to his three ex-wives. He even proposes a toast with Hotchner, to commemorate Prentiss and Hotchner's deceased wife Haley (Meredith Monroe).

In the season six finale, he is almost shot in the face by a suspect pretending to be a victim of human trafficking; however, Morgan's quick reaction saves his life. Later he meets Jareau in his office after solving the case. She meets him to let him know that she is returning to the team.

In season seven, Rossi is just as surprised as the others to learn that Prentiss is alive. However, in "Proof", he mentions to Hotchner that he had an inkling that Prentiss wasn't dead. As he has no children from his previous marriages, Rossi has adopted the BAU team as his own family and invites them to his house for dinner.^{E702}

In "Profiling 101", convicted serial killer Tommy Yates (Adam Nelson) boasts to Rossi about killing and mutilating a total of 101 women and gives him a list of 40 victims' names. Yates makes a deal with Rossi and the FBI to avoid the death penalty in exchange for revealing one additional name per year on a "special day", which proves to be Rossi's birthday.

In "Annihilator" he is forced into retirement when assistant director of National Security Linda Barnes (Kim Rhodes) reassigns the BAU. However, he is reinstated by the end of the next episode.

Rossi carries a Springfield Professional Model 1911-A1 .45 ACP pistol as his duty sidearm. Only active or former members of the FBI's Hostage Rescue Team and Regional SWAT teams are authorized to carry that pistol. Although never mentioned this would seem to indicate that Rossi served on one or both of these elite FBI tactical units at one time during his FBI career.

== Awards and decorations ==
In "Anonymous", Rossi's military awards and decorations can be clearly seen in a shadowbox hanging on his office wall. The following are the medals and service awards fictionally worn by Sgt. Maj. Rossi.

Personal decorations
Purple Heart
Meritorious Service Medal
Navy and Marine Corps Commendation Medal with two award stars and V Device
Navy and Marine Corps Achievement Medal with V Device
Combat Action Ribbon
Unit awards
Navy Presidential Unit Citation
Navy Unit Commendation
Meritorious Unit Commendation with one service star
Service Awards
Marine Corps Good Conduct Medal
Selected Marine Corps Reserve Medal with two service stars
Campaign and service medals
National Defense Service Medal
Armed Forces Expeditionary Medal
Vietnam Service Medal with three service stars
Service and training awards
Navy Sea Service Deployment Ribbon
Foreign awards
Vietnam Gallantry Cross
Vietnam Presidential Unit Citation
Vietnam Gallantry Cross Unit Citation
Vietnam Civil Actions Unit Citation
Vietnam Campaign Medal

Other accoutrements
Marine Corps Expert Rifle Badge
Marine Corps Expert Pistol Badge
