= Criminal Minds season 19 =

Season of television series Criminal Minds

Criminal Minds: Evolution
- Season 19
- Starring: Joe Mantegna; A. J. Cook; Kirsten Vangsness; Aisha Tyler; Zach Gilford; RJ Hatanaka; Adam Rodriguez; Paget Brewster
- No. of episodes: 10

Release
- Original network: Paramount+
- Original release: May 28 – July 23, 2026

Season chronology
- ← Previous; Season 18

The nineteenth season of the American police procedural crime drama television series Criminal Minds, now subtitled Evolution, follows members of the Behavioral Analysis Unit (BAU) as they are faced with a network of serial killers built during the COVID-19 pandemic. The season serves as a fourth season revival of the series after its original run on CBS ended six years earlier.

The season premiered on May 28, 2026, on Paramount+ in the U.S. and on Disney+ in other regions. In May 2026, Criminal Minds was renewed for a twentieth and final season.

== Cast ==
The nineteenth season of Criminal Minds will see the return of every main character from the eighteenth season, including the multi-season suspect Elias Voit.

=== Main ===
- Joe Mantegna as David Rossi
- A. J. Cook as Jennifer “JJ” Jareau
- Kirsten Vangsness as Penelope Garcia
- Aisha Tyler as Dr. Tara Lewis
- Zach Gilford as Elias Voit
- RJ Hatanaka as Tyler Green
- Adam Rodriguez as Luke Alvez
- Paget Brewster as Emily Prentiss

=== Recurring ===
- Nicole Pacent as Rebecca Wilson
- Mekhai Andersen as Henry LaMontagne
- Phoenix Andersen as Michael LaMontagne
- Paul F. Tompkins as Brian Garrity
- Connor Storrie as Lance Kingston
- Jessi Case as Laura Boyd
- Yvette Nicole Brown as Shelia Watkins
- Justin Kirk as James Crowley

=== Guest ===
- Jeri Ryan as Susan Cartwright
- Tyler Lawrence Gray as Mark Benton
- Robert Morgan as Frank Warner
- Silas Weir Mitchell as Cyrus Lebrun
- Levi Meaden as Noel Warner
- Jamison Jones as Agent Tom Milliken
- Lyndon Smith as Kim Newton
- Richard Cabral as David Graham
- Meredith Salenger as Mrs. Ryan
- Cress Williams as Davonte Faust
- Kofi Siriboe as Tristan Burke
- Rob Yang as DA Emory Joy
- Dash Mihok as Sean Fincher
- Inny Clemons as Brenton Woodrow
- Nicholas Gonzalez as Peter O'Connor
- Molly Burnett as Cora Sault
- Cara Jade Myers as Ruby Russo
- Allison Nordahl as Hollie Voit
- Joseph Cross as Marvin Bancroft
- Clark Gregg as FBI Director Ray Madison

== Episodes ==
No. overall	No. in season	Title	Directed by	Written by	Original release date
355	1	"Now and Then"	Doug Aarniokoski	Erica Messer	May 28, 2026
The BAU investigates the kidnapping of three graduate students near Roanoke, Virginia, and find it may be connected to other kidnappings reaching back 30 years. With Voit in federal prison, Tara asks him to consider meeting with the families of some of his victims who want closure. A new unsub, "The Fan", kills a woman in her dorm room.
356	2	"Cluster"	Anthony Vietro	Breen Frazier	May 28, 2026
An old friend of Alvez's asks the BAU to investigate the death of another veteran, who killed himself and two others in an intentional gas explosion, and the team finds it is connected to an unsub who lobotomizes his victims. Brian Garrity returns, now an influential true crime podcaster who believes the FBI trained Voit as a Manchurian candidate. After learning the mother of one of his victims believes the conspiracy, Voit appears on Garrity's podcast from prison to confront him. Alvez deals with the death of his pet dog.
357	3	"Body Count"	Jackeline Tejada	Christopher Barbour	June 4, 2026
The body of a girl who was kidnapped alongside her mother in 2022 is discovered in Durham County, North Carolina, and the local District Attorney believes Voit is responsible, despite him not having earlier named them as his victims. Voit agrees to show them the mother's body, but only if he can do so in person. Green doubts his abilities as a profiler. JJ moves in with Garcia. Voit receives a letter from The Fan over his podcast appearance.
358	4	"The Witching Hour"	Adam Rodriguez	Carlton William Gillespie	June 11, 2026
The BAU investigates an unsub in Colorado Springs, Colorado who has killed two women with a sledgehammer in front of their husbands, accusing the couples of heresy. Lewis and Voit attempt to profile The Fan, who sends Voit another letter containing photos of a possible victim. JJ hopes to speak with her son Henry over his upcoming choice of college.
359	5	"Friendly Fire"	Nelson McCormick	Sullivan Fitzgerald	June 18, 2026
An FBI instructor for the Hostage Rescue Team is shot with a live round during an exercise, and Alvez and Green interrogate the other trainees to find the truth. Alvez takes a personal interest in the case, as he was friends with the victim. Garrity receives a letter from The Fan that is similar to the one sent to Voit. To get more info on them, Rossi appears on a live episode of Garrity's show with the hopes that The Fan will call in.
360	6	"Proxy"	Sharat Raju	Chikodili Agwuna	June 25, 2026
The BAU investigates the murders of two camgirls, both of whom had money stuffed down their throats, and must determine whether it was The Fan or a different killer. Garcia is asked to work both cases, which takes a toll on her health and sleep. Garrity questions the impact of his podcast after The Fan nearly killed a man while on the live show. After finding out "Lee Duval" contacted his ex-wife, Garrity meets Voit, who has a proposal for him.
361	7	"The Furies"	Zach Gilford	Jayne A. Archer	July 2, 2026
The BAU investigates the brutal murder of two sheriff's deputies in a New Mexico border town and find it may be connected to a gang in the sheriff's office. Garcia and Rossi clash over the former's character testimony supporting Voit during his trial. Voit receives a visitor and suspects he may be The Fan.
362	8	"Requiem"	James Takata	Charles Dewey	July 9, 2026
Several women are found dead in West Virginia with their blood drained and their eyes glued open, leading to the BAU being called in. Voit asks for the BAU to check in on his family in Witness Protection, following a threat from The Fan.
363	9	"Special Agent Garrity"	Bethany Rooney	Ryan McGonnigal & Breen Frazier	July 16, 2026
The Fan, real name James Crowley, kidnaps Brian Garrity's ex-wife Sheila and lures Garrity to the church in Alexandria, Virginia where they were married. After restraining both, Crowley turns himself in to the BAU, but the team has a hard time proving he is The Fan. Meanwhile, Voit begins the final stages of his escape plan.
364	10	"Bad Blood"	Glenn Kershaw	Christopher Barbour	July 23, 2026
Voit escapes prison to find Crowley just as Crowley kidnaps Voit's daughter Holly. The BAU has to juggle rescuing one of Crowley's victims in Philadelphia and capturing Crowley and Voit in Leon County, Florida.
