= Criminal Minds season 16 =

Season of television series Criminal Minds

Criminal Minds: Evolution
- Season 16
- Season 16 U.S. DVD cover
- Starring: Joe Mantegna; A. J. Cook; Kirsten Vangsness; Aisha Tyler; Adam Rodriguez; Paget Brewster
- No. of episodes: 10

Release
- Original network: Paramount+
- Original release: November 24, 2022 – February 9, 2023

Season chronology
- ← Previous; Season 15 Next → Season 17

The sixteenth season of the American police procedural crime drama television series Criminal Minds, now subtitled Evolution, follows members of the Behavioral Analysis Unit (BAU) as they are faced with a network of serial killers built during the COVID-19 pandemic. The season serves as a first season revival of the series after its original run on CBS ended two years earlier.

The season premiered on November 24, 2022 on Paramount+ in the U.S. and on Disney+ in other regions on November 25, 2022. In January 2023, Evolution was renewed for another season.

== Cast ==
=== Main ===
- Joe Mantegna as David Rossi
- A. J. Cook as Jennifer "JJ" Jareau
- Kirsten Vangsness as Penelope Garcia
- Aisha Tyler as Dr. Tara Lewis
- Adam Rodriguez as Luke Alvez
- Paget Brewster as Emily Prentiss

=== Recurring ===
- Zach Gilford as Elias Voit
- Josh Stewart as Will LaMontagne Jr.
- Nicholas D'Agosto as Deputy Director Doug Bailey
- Nicole Pacent as Rebecca Wilson
- Ryan-James Hatanaka as Tyler Green
- Kiele Sanchez as Sydney Voit
- Monnae Michaell as Attorney General Louise Davis

=== Guest ===
- Gail O'Grady as Krystall Rossi
- Luke Benward as Benjamin Reeves
- Beth Broderick as Senator Martha Reeves
- Silas Weir Mitchell as Cyrus Lebrun
- Jonathan Del Arco as Silvio Herrera
- Kerry Knuppe as Ramona Havener

== Episodes ==
No. overall	No. in season	Title	Directed by	Written by	Original release date
325	1	"Just Getting Started"	Nelson McCormick	Erica Messer	November 24, 2022
When a teenage girl is abducted from her Bethesda, Maryland home and her parents are killed, the BAU believes the same perpetrator killed a family of four in Alexandria, Virginia. Meanwhile, Lewis investigates a number of bodies that were found in a Yakima County, Washington storage container, and developments in the abduction case bring former analyst Penelope Garcia back into the fold.
326	2	"Sicarius"	Nelson McCormick	Breen Frazier	November 24, 2022
When two men in the Washington, D.C. area are killed with their spinal cords severed and both men are found to be "bulls" in cuckoldry, the team tries to find the killer. Meanwhile, the team discovers that this case and the last are connected to a serial killer network led by a man dubbed "Sicarius," and Lewis's girlfriend informs the team that the Department of Justice is trying to disband them.
327	3	"Moose"	Joe Mantegna	Matthew Lau	December 1, 2022
As the BAU attempts to find the remaining kill kits, they try to locate a former army specialist who they believe is planning to detonate an incendiary device in a Washington, D.C. park. While trying to find him, the BAU comes into conflict with the FBI's domestic terrorism unit.
328	4	"Pay-Per-View"	Adam Rodriguez	Christopher Barbour	December 8, 2022
Having learned the army specialist, Tyler Green, was not a member of the network, but rather an undercover vigilante trying to find his sister, Lewis and Garcia try to convince him to help them find Sicarius. The team investigates a pair of Germantown, Maryland home invaders who lure security guards to residences with home security systems, before forcing the homeowners to watch their murders over security cameras.
329	5	"Oedipus Wrecks"	Sharat Raju	Jayne A. Archer	December 15, 2022
After two women employed in government jobs in the Washington, D.C. area are found dead with numerous bite marks, the team works to locate the unsub. But after learning their main suspect is the son of a prominent senator, they find the case could have major political implications. Deputy Director Doug Bailey joins the investigation, as one of the victims was a former girlfriend he met on a dating site for government employees. Garcia and Tyler Green come into conflict while looking for clues on Sicarius.
330	6	"True Conviction"	Bethany Rooney	Chikodili Agwuna	January 12, 2023
The aftermath of the explosion threatens to end the Sicarius case unless the team comes up with a legitimate reason to keep it open. The search brings them to a prisoner on death row.
331	7	"What Doesn't Kill Us"	Aisha Tyler	Sullivan Fitzgerald	January 19, 2023
While the team continues to investigate Sicarius, they also must find an unsub in Harpers Ferry, West Virginia who killed one person and kidnapped two others. Prentiss tells Garcia she must break things off with Tyler, and Lewis interviews a woman after her abducted dog Moose is found to have a connection to Sicarius.
332	8	"Forget Me Knots"	A. J. Cook	Carlton Gillespie	January 26, 2023
The team gets closer to finding Sicarius after finding surveillance footage of him at a hardware store, while also investigating how a recently deceased North Carolina man could be involved. The team suspects a missing Indio, California real estate agent Ramona Havener, was kidnapped by Sicarius and a local follower of his.
333	9	"Memento Mori"	Doug Aarniokoski	Breen Frazier	February 2, 2023
Rossi will go to any lengths to prove that Elias Voit is Sicarius. But Voit turns Rossi into his own worst enemy, putting his future at the BAU in jeopardy.
334	10	"Dead End"	Glenn Kershaw	Christopher Barbour	February 9, 2023
With Rossi in Voit’s clutches, he grapples with the limits of his technical know-how and mental strength. As the BAU tightens their grip on Voit, he reveals just how far he’s willing to take his deadly crusade.

== Production ==
=== Development ===
In February 2021, a revival of Criminal Minds was announced to be in early development at Paramount+ with 10 episodes planned. The series was confirmed to be still in development in February 2022. Paramount+ officially gave a series order in July 2022. The official title of the new series was revealed in September 2022.

In May 2023, CBS Home Entertainment announced that Evolution would be released to Blu-ray and DVD on June 20, 2023; with the home release officially dubbing it the "sixteenth season" of the series overall.

=== Casting ===
Most of the main cast of the last season of the previous series returned, with the exception of Matthew Gray Gubler and Daniel Henney. On September 4, 2022, Josh Stewart confirmed he would reprise his role as Will LaMontagne Jr. On September 9, 2022, Zach Gilford was cast in a recurring role.

=== Filming ===
Filming began in August 2022. In September 2022, Joe Mantegna announced that he would be directing an episode this season. Later that month, it was confirmed that A. J. Cook, Aisha Tyler and Adam Rodriguez would also be directing episodes this season.
