= Criminal Minds season 14 =

Season of television series Criminal Minds

Criminal Minds
- Season 14
- Season 14 U.S. DVD cover
- Starring: Joe Mantegna; Matthew Gray Gubler; A. J. Cook; Kirsten Vangsness; Aisha Tyler; Daniel Henney; Adam Rodriguez; Paget Brewster
- No. of episodes: 15

Release
- Original network: CBS
- Original release: October 3, 2018 – February 6, 2019

Season chronology
- ← Previous; Season 13 Next → Season 15

The fourteenth season of Criminal Minds was ordered on May 12, 2018, by CBS with an order of 15 episodes. The season premiered on October 3, 2018, and concluded on February 6, 2019. The season also featured the milestone 300th episode, which served as the season premiere. This is the first season since season 11 not to feature Shemar Moore as Derek Morgan, who was now busy starring in S.W.A.T.

== Cast ==
=== Main ===
- Joe Mantegna as Supervisory Special Agent David Rossi (BAU Senior Agent)
- Matthew Gray Gubler as Supervisory Special Agent Dr. Spencer Reid (BAU Agent)
- A. J. Cook as Supervisory Special Agent Jennifer "JJ" Jareau (BAU Agent)
- Kirsten Vangsness as Special Agent Penelope Garcia (BAU Technical Analyst & Co-Communications Liaison)
- Aisha Tyler as Supervisory Special Agent Dr. Tara Lewis (BAU Agent)
- Daniel Henney as Supervisory Special Agent Matt Simmons (BAU Agent)
- Adam Rodriguez as Supervisory Special Agent Luke Alvez (BAU Agent)
- Paget Brewster as Supervisory Special Agent Emily Prentiss (BAU Unit Chief & Co-Communications Liaison)

=== Recurring ===
- Gail O'Grady as Krystall Richards
- Danielle C. Ryan as Portia Richards
- Kelly Frye as Kristy Simmons
- Declan Whaley as David Simmons
- Josh Stewart as William "Will" LaMontagne Jr.
- Mekhai Andersen as Henry LaMontagne
- Daniella Alonso as Lisa Douglas
- Stephen Bishop as Andrew Mendoza

=== Guest ===
- James Urbaniak as FBI Special Agent Owen Quinn
- Karen David as FBI Special Agent Mary Meadows
- Michael Hogan as Benjamin David Merva
- Sebastian Sozzi as Carlos Garcia
- Corey Reynolds as Former FBI Fugitive task force Agent Phil Brooks
- Gale Harold as Dr. Daryl Wright
- Candy Clark as Sandy Jareau
- Michael Mosley as Everett Lynch
- Sharon Lawrence as Roberta Lynch
- Alex Jennings as Grace Lynch
- Amber Stevens West as Joy Struthers
- Johnny Mathis as himself

== Production ==
=== Development ===
Criminal Minds was renewed for a fourteenth season with an episode order of 15 episodes on May 12, 2018, with the possibility of more episodes being ordered later in the season. On November 27, 2018, it was reported that CBS had declined to order any more episodes for the season.

On June 25, 2018, it was revealed that Matthew Gray Gubler, Joe Mantegna, Aisha Tyler, and Adam Rodriguez would direct episodes this season and that A. J. Cook would make her directorial debut and direct an episode this season.

On September 21, 2018, it was revealed that Kirsten Vangsness and showrunner Erica Messer would be co-writing the fifteenth episode of the season, which also served as the season finale. This would have been the fifth episode they have co-written together. On December 6, 2018, it was revealed Messer and Vangsness would no longer be co-writing the episode and that Erica Meredith would be doing so instead.

=== Casting ===
On October 19, 2018, it was announced that Stephen Bishop had been cast in a recurring role as SSA Andrew Mendoza, who is a love interest for Emily Prentiss.

== Episodes ==
| No. overall | No. in season | Title | Directed by | Written by | Original release date | Prod. code | U.S. viewers (millions) |
|---|---|---|---|---|---|---|---|
| 300 | 1 | "300" | Glenn Kershaw | Erica Messer | October 3, 2018 | 1401 | 4.45 |
When messianic cult leader Benjamin David Merva (Michael Hogan) and his followers take Reid and Garcia hostage, the BAU juggles rescuing their colleagues and stopping Merva from carrying out a sinister agenda.
| 301 | 2 | "Starter Home" | Diana C. Valentine | Bruce Zimmerman | October 10, 2018 | 1402 | 4.65 |
When nine sets of mummified female remains are excavated from a remote South Carolina cabin, the BAU sets out to determine if a two-person killing team was responsible or if the crimes were committed by a lone killer. Meanwhile, Rossi continues to rekindle his relationship with Krystall.
| 302 | 3 | "Rule 34" | Alec Smight | Christopher Barbour | October 17, 2018 | 1403 | 4.42 |
When six women in the Washington metropolitan area receive packages containing male appendages severed by disarticulation, the BAU works to identify the victim and establish a connection between the six recipients. Meanwhile, Simmons and Kristy try to communicate with their son, David, after he is suspended for hitting a classmate.
| 303 | 4 | "Innocence" | Lily Mariye | Stephanie Sengupta | October 24, 2018 | 1405 | 4.29 |
When a woman from Tallahassee, Florida is bludgeoned to death and her husband's alibi rules him out as the prime suspect, the BAU works with local authorities in Tallahassee and Arlington, Virginia to identify the killer. Meanwhile, Prentiss grows increasingly concerned about Garcia's behavior.
| 304 | 5 | "The Tall Man" | Matthew Gray Gubler | Breen Frazier | October 31, 2018 | 1404 | 4.41 |
When three East Allegheny, Pennsylvania teenagers go missing and one resurfaces the following day with limited memories, the BAU juggles locating the other girls and establishing the role a regional urban legend plays in the disappearances. Meanwhile, JJ finds herself flashing back to the events surrounding her sister's suicide.
| 305 | 6 | "Luke" | Joe Mantegna | Erik Stiller | November 7, 2018 | 1406 | 4.56 |
When four people living in various cities along the East Coast are tortured and murdered over a three-day span, the BAU attempts to connect the spree with a DEA-Federal Police manhunt for an infamous Mexican cartel hitman. Meanwhile, Alvez juggles moving in with his girlfriend and becoming emotionally involved in the investigation.
| 306 | 7 | "Twenty Seven" | Sharat Raju | Erica Meredith | November 14, 2018 | 1407 | 4.52 |
When three people in the Washington metropolitan area are hospitalized with life-threatening injuries after being attacked with a machete, the BAU works with the local field office to track down a pair of spree killers driven to take a life every twenty-seven minutes.
| 307 | 8 | "Ashley" | Adam Rodriguez | Stephanie Birkitt | November 21, 2018 | 1408 | 5.50 |
When a couple from Plymouth, New Hampshire is gunned down in their sleep and their eight-year-old daughter is reported missing, the BAU searches for a budding abductor set on recreating a person from his past. Meanwhile, Rossi plans to take the next step in his relationship with Krystall.
| 308 | 9 | "Broken Wing" | Aisha Tyler | Jim Clemente | December 5, 2018 | 1409 | 4.50 |
When seven California drug addicts die from opiate overdoses hours after completing various in-patient treatments, the BAU sets out to profile a budding Angel of Mercy bent on relieving his victims of their suffering. Meanwhile, Lewis finds herself forced to face her past after reconnecting with her ex-husband.
| 309 | 10 | "Flesh and Blood" | Glenn Kershaw | Christopher Barbour | December 12, 2018 | 1410 | 5.43 |
When two local attorneys are abducted, tortured, and found with their hearts crudely cut out of their chests, the BAU attempts to establish a connection between the investigation and a case from their past. Meanwhile, Prentiss juggles wrestling with her inner demons and organizing a romantic date with SSA Andrew Mendoza (Stephen Bishop).
| 310 | 11 | "Night Lights" | Nelson McCormick | Heather Nöel Aldridge | January 2, 2019 | 1411 | 4.92 |
When the mysterious abduction of a man from Portland, Oregon is connected to an unsolved double homicide, the BAU sets out to track down a killer who blinds his victims before forcing them to play a deadly cat and mouse game. Meanwhile, Alvez invites the rest of the team to a housewarming party at his new apartment.
| 311 | 12 | "Hamelin" | Simon Mirren | Bruce Zimmerman | January 9, 2019 | 1412 | 4.55 |
When three Iowa children disappear from their homes on the same night and surveillance cameras in a local park capture the children freely entering their captor's van, the BAU sets out to profile a budding injustice collector with dark motives. Meanwhile, JJ spends personal time with her mother, Sandy (Candy Clark), after renovation jobs force them out of their respective houses.
| 312 | 13 | "Chameleon" | A. J. Cook | Charles Dewey & Breen Frazier | January 23, 2019 | 1413 | 4.45 |
After returning from an investigation in Nashville, Tennessee, Rossi breaks down in front of Krystall and begins to question his actions as he recounts the events surrounding the BAU's attempt to track down a con artist-turned-serial killer with misogynistic attitudes.
| 313 | 14 | "Sick and Evil" | Rob Bailey | Erik Stiller | January 30, 2019 | 1414 | 4.73 |
When four Lewiston, Maine residents are stabbed to death in their homes, the BAU searches for a paranormal-obsessed serial killer who operates on the belief that the residences they target are haunted. Meanwhile, Rossi juggles tracking down wanted killer Everett Lynch and recovering from his near-death experience.
| 314 | 15 | "Truth or Dare" | Glenn Kershaw | Erica Meredith | February 6, 2019 | 1415 | 4.72 |
The BAU returns to Los Angeles to track down a possible spree killer after two people are killed in car accidents-turned-shootings. Meanwhile, Rossi and Krystall prepare for their wedding and an unexpected confession promises to change the course of everyone's lives forever.

== Ratings ==
Viewership and ratings per episode of Criminal Minds season 14
| No. | Title | Air date | Rating/share (18–49) | Viewers (millions) | DVR (18–49) | DVR viewers (millions) | Total (18–49) | Total viewers (millions) |
|---|---|---|---|---|---|---|---|---|
| 1 | "300" | October 3, 2018 | 0.7/3 | 4.45 | 1.0 | 3.92 | 1.7 | 8.37 |
| 2 | "Starter Home" | October 10, 2018 | 0.8/3 | 4.65 | 0.9 | 3.56 | 1.7 | 8.21 |
| 3 | "Rule 34" | October 17, 2018 | 0.7/3 | 4.42 | 0.9 | 3.62 | 1.6 | 8.04 |
| 4 | "Innocence" | October 24, 2018 | 0.7/3 | 4.29 | 1.0 | 3.67 | 1.7 | 7.96 |
| 5 | "The Tall Man" | October 31, 2018 | 0.7/3 | 4.41 | 0.9 | 3.43 | 1.6 | 7.85 |
| 6 | "Luke" | November 7, 2018 | 0.8/3 | 4.56 | 0.9 | 3.51 | 1.7 | 8.07 |
| 7 | "Twenty Seven" | November 14, 2018 | 0.7/3 | 4.52 | 0.9 | 3.30 | 1.6 | 7.83 |
| 8 | "Ashley" | November 21, 2018 | 0.9/4 | 5.50 | 1.0 | 3.56 | 1.9 | 9.06 |
| 9 | "Broken Wing" | December 5, 2018 | 0.7/3 | 4.50 | 0.9 | 3.54 | 1.6 | 8.04 |
| 10 | "Flesh and Blood" | December 12, 2018 | 0.8/3 | 5.43 | 0.9 | 3.40 | 1.7 | 8.84 |
| 11 | "Night Lights" | January 2, 2019 | 0.7/3 | 4.92 | 0.9 | 3.57 | 1.6 | 8.49 |
| 12 | "Hamelin" | January 9, 2019 | 0.8/3 | 4.55 | 0.9 | 3.63 | 1.7 | 8.18 |
| 13 | "Chameleon" | January 23, 2019 | 0.8/4 | 4.45 | 1.0 | 3.92 | 1.8 | 8.38 |
| 14 | "Sick and Evil" | January 30, 2019 | 0.8/4 | 4.73 | 0.9 | 3.53 | 1.7 | 8.26 |
| 15 | "Truth or Dare" | February 6, 2019 | 0.8/4 | 4.72 | 0.9 | 3.79 | 1.7 | 8.52 |
