= Criminal Minds season 9 =

Season of television series Criminal Minds

Criminal Minds
- Season 9
- Season 9 U.S. DVD cover
- Starring: Joe Mantegna; Shemar Moore; Matthew Gray Gubler; A. J. Cook; Kirsten Vangsness; Jeanne Tripplehorn; Thomas Gibson
- No. of episodes: 24

Release
- Original network: CBS
- Original release: September 25, 2013 – May 14, 2014

Season chronology
- ← Previous; Season 8 Next → Season 10

Criminal Minds was officially renewed for a ninth season on May 9, 2013 and premiered on CBS and CTV, on September 25, 2013. The season consists of 24 episodes with the 200th episode being episode 14 of the season, and the finale on 14 May. The season revealed more on the past of Agent Jennifer "JJ" Jareau, with actress A. J. Cook saying, "We're going to use the serendipitous gift of Season 6 to explain with flashbacks what happened when she was working for the Pentagon and why she came back as a much tougher character. I've never had a chance to flex my acting muscles like this on the show!" The season also featured the return of Paget Brewster and Jayne Atkinson for the 200th episode, which aired on February 5, 2014. On May 14, 2014, it was revealed at the end of the season finale that Alex Blake (Jeanne Tripplehorn) would be leaving the show.

== Cast ==
=== Main ===
- Joe Mantegna as Supervisory Special Agent David Rossi (BAU Senior Agent)
- Shemar Moore as Supervisory Special Agent Derek Morgan (BAU Agent)
- Matthew Gray Gubler as Supervisory Special Agent Dr. Spencer Reid (BAU Agent)
- A. J. Cook as Supervisory Special Agent Jennifer "JJ" Jareau (BAU Agent)
- Kirsten Vangsness as Special Agent Penelope Garcia (BAU Technical Analyst & Co-Communications Liaison)
- Jeanne Tripplehorn as Supervisory Special Agent Dr. Alex Blake (BAU Agent)
- Thomas Gibson as Supervisory Special Agent Aaron "Hotch" Hotchner (BAU Unit Chief & Co-Communications Liaison)

=== Special guest star ===
- Paget Brewster as Agent Emily Prentiss (Chief of Interpol-London Office)

=== Recurring ===
- Esai Morales as Supervisory Special Agent Mateo "Matt" Cruz (BAU Section Chief)
- Rochelle Aytes as Savannah Hayes
- Cade Owens as Jack Hotchner
- Mekhai Andersen as Henry LaMontagne
- Nicholas Brendon as Kevin Lynch
- Meredith Monroe as Haley Hotchner
- Josh Stewart as William "Will" LaMontagne Jr.

=== Guest ===
- Jayne Atkinson as Erin Strauss
- C. Thomas Howell as George Foyet / The Reaper
- Eva LaRue as Tanya Mays

== Episodes ==
No. overall	No. in season	Title	Directed by	Written by	Original release date	Prod. code	U.S. viewers (millions)
187	1	"The Inspiration"	Glenn Kershaw	Janine Sherman Barrois	September 25, 2013	901	11.27
When two single Glendale, Arizona women are sexually assaulted, shot in the heart, and left in a praying position, the BAU sets out to apprehend a devolving serial killer (Frederick Koehler) who forces his victims to eat human flesh. Meanwhile, Hotch contemplates filling in for Strauss as the new Section Chief and an unexpected twist promises to change the course of the investigation.
188	2	"The Inspired"	Larry Teng	Breen Frazier	October 2, 2013	902	11.12
After the BAU is informed that a fingerprint comparison has revealed the man they arrested is not Wallace Hines but instead his estranged identical twin brother, the team returns to Glendale and juggles delving into the brothers' respective pasts, convincing their narcissistic biological mother (Camryn Manheim) to cooperate in the investigation, and tracking down Hines before he strikes again.
189	3	"Final Shot"	Bethany Rooney	Sharon Lee Watson	October 9, 2013	904	10.98
When a sniper guns down six people in a Dallas, Texas plaza, the BAU attempts to determine whether the crime was a homegrown terrorist attack inspired by the upcoming 50th anniversary of John F. Kennedy's assassination or a targeted attack that was aimed at a particular individual.
190	4	"To Bear Witness"	Rob Bailey	Erica Messer	October 16, 2013	903	11.06
When an unidentified man is subjected to lobotomy and found wandering the streets of Baltimore, Maryland with a microscopic camera implanted into his right eye, the BAU juggles communicating with the victim and connecting the case to the unsolved death of another man in Germany from earlier in the year. Meanwhile, the team welcomes new Section Chief Mateo Cruz (Esai Morales), who has a secret past relationship with JJ.
191	5	"Route 66"	Doug Aarniokoski	Virgil Williams	October 23, 2013	905	11.55
When a teenage Wichita, Kansas girl is reported missing after she and her boyfriend are attacked, the BAU suspects her estranged ex-convict father is attempting to flee the country with her. During the case's briefing, Hotch collapses due to complications from the stab wounds he received during his war against George Foyet and is rushed to the hospital with Rossi and Garcia accompanying him to obtain word on his prognosis.
192	6	"In the Blood"	Michael Lange	Bruce Zimmerman	October 30, 2013	906	10.64
When a Provo, Utah woman is found buried in a tomb of rocks, the BAU sets out to track down a ritualistic killer obsessed with the Salem Witch Trials. Meanwhile, Garcia prepares to host a Day of the Dead celebration at her apartment and Hotch returns to work after fully recovering from his surgery.
193	7	"Gatekeeper"	Matthew Gray Gubler	Rick Dunkle	November 6, 2013	907	9.70
When three Boston, Massachusetts men are blitz-attacked, mugged, and strangled to death, the BAU sets out to profile a stalker who kills anyone he perceives as a bad influence. Meanwhile, the team rallies behind Rossi after learning his favorite bar is going out of business.
194	8	"The Return"	John Terlesky	Kimberly Ann Harrison	November 13, 2013	908	11.63
When a runaway teenage boy guns down three people at a Chicago, Illinois diner before getting shot to death by an off-duty police officer who happened to be at the diner at the time of the incident, the BAU determines the shooter was manipulated into carrying out the attack and was a member of a homegrown terrorist group. Meanwhile, Morgan discovers his latest romantic interest, Dr. Savannah Hayes (Rochelle Aytes), takes her job just as seriously as he does.
195	9	"Strange Fruit"	Constantine Makris	Janine Sherman Barrois	November 20, 2013	909	12.40
When a water main explosion leads to the discovery of two sets of female skeletal remains in an elderly Virginia couple's backyard, the BAU juggles identifying the victims and delving into the couple's respective pasts, as well as their son's. Meanwhile, JJ and Cruz contemplate telling the rest of the team about their past relationship.
196	10	"The Caller"	Rob Bailey	Sharon Lee Watson	November 27, 2013	910	11.10
When a St. Louis, Missouri couple receives a cryptic phone call before finding their 10-year-old son missing and their front door covered in blood, the BAU suspects the disappearance is linked to the unsolved murder of a nine-year-old Memphis, Tennessee boy from 15 years earlier and attempts to establish a connection between both crimes.
197	11	"Bully"	Glenn Kershaw	Virgil Williams	December 11, 2013	911	11.19
After concluding a case in Los Angeles, California, the BAU travels to Kansas City, Missouri to connect a man's murder to an unsolved double homicide from the previous year. Meanwhile, a tense reunion ensues between Blake, her father, a retired police captain, and her brother, a detective, with whom she must work to find the killer.
198	12	"The Black Queen"	Tawnia McKiernan	Breen Frazier	January 15, 2014	912	10.35
When an online collective hacks the Justice Department and the San Jose Police Department, claiming a San Quentin State Prison death row inmate set to be executed in two weeks for murdering eight prostitutes 10 years earlier is innocent, Garcia attempts to assist the BAU by delving into her past.
199	13	"The Road Home"	Joe Mantegna	Bruce Zimmerman	January 22, 2014	913	10.35
When four petty Cleveland, Ohio criminals are gunned down, the BAU connects the shootings to a robbery-homicide from 10 years earlier and sets out to track down a mission-oriented vigilante. Meanwhile, Rossi travels alone to Los Angeles, California when his former Marine Corps sergeant (Meshach Taylor) is reported missing and JJ's secret about her past relationship with Cruz begins to catch up with her.
200	14	"200"	Larry Teng	Rick Dunkle	February 5, 2014	914	12.92
When JJ and Cruz are abducted and their disappearances are connected to a secret mission in Afghanistan from their time with the State Department three years earlier, the BAU secretly works with former SSA Emily Prentiss (Paget Brewster) to find their missing colleagues.
201	15	"Mr. & Mrs. Anderson"	Félix Alcalá	Kimberly Ann Harrison	February 19, 2014	915	10.06
When two unidentified women in Pittsburgh, Pennsylvania are strangled to death, stripped, and wrapped in shower curtains, the BAU suspects the crimes were committed by a couple with strained marriage issues. Meanwhile, Morgan and Garcia make Valentine's Day plans for their respective significant others and JJ returns from her leave of absence.
202	16	"Gabby"	Thomas Gibson	Jim Clemente & Erica Messer	February 26, 2014	916	9.42
When a four-year-old Hattiesburg, Mississippi girl disappears while temporarily staying with her mother's cousin, the BAU juggles tracking down the missing child, determining whether or not her estranged father was involved in the kidnapping, and identifying the owner of a minivan seen at a local gas station where the incident occurred.
203	17	"Persuasion"	Rob Lieberman	Sharon Lee Watson	March 5, 2014	917	11.42
When two unidentified women are drowned and subsequently found in the desert outside Las Vegas, Nevada, the BAU sets out to profile a homeless serial killer exacting revenge against members of his own community. Meanwhile, Reid grows increasingly anxious after attempting to contact his mother and learning she went on a trip without telling him.
204	18	"Rabid"	Doug Aarniokoski	Virgil Williams	March 12, 2014	918	10.74
When three bodies with bite marks are found in a nature reserve outside Milwaukee, Wisconsin, the BAU attempts to track down a killer who infects his victims with rabies and records them reacting to their symptoms. Meanwhile, Garcia and Reid prepare for an upcoming fitness test, but attempt to keep it a secret from Morgan.
205	19	"The Edge of Winter"	Hanelle Culpepper	Janine Sherman Barrois	March 19, 2014	919	10.14
While helping a traumatized survivor prepare her testimony for an upcoming trial, Morgan reflects on the events surrounding their first encounter and the BAU's investigation of the murders of three people, leading to the team profiling a Hamilton, New York serial killer using his crimes to know about the abuse he suffered as a child.
206	20	"Blood Relations"	Matthew Gray Gubler	Breen Frazier	April 2, 2014	920	10.47
When two Wheeling, West Virginia hunters are killed by traps lined with barbed wire, the BAU juggles identifying a killer with a twisted agenda, investigating a long-standing feud between two local families, and uncovering a secret one woman is determined to keep hidden.
207	21	"What Happens in Mecklinburg"	Rob Hardy	Ticona S. Joy	April 9, 2014	921	9.85
When three people are abducted from parking lots around West Tennessee, the BAU connects the kidnappings to a hazing incident that resulted in the death of a student at a Memphis university from a year earlier and sets out to apprehend a killer bent on revenge. Meanwhile, Morgan's relationship with Savannah is put to the test when she complains about how much travel his job requires.
208	22	"Fatal"	Larry Teng	Bruce Zimmerman	April 30, 2014	922	10.30
When three Long Beach, California residents receive written death threats in their mailboxes and subsequently die from arsenic poisoning, the BAU sets out to profile a serial killer obsessed with Greek mythology. Meanwhile, Hotch contemplates participating in Jack's school's upcoming career day.
209	23	"Angels"	Rob Bailey	Rick Dunkle, Breen Frazier & Janine Sherman Barrois	May 7, 2014	923	10.52
When a Briscoe County, Texas prostitute is tortured and shot execution-style and her death is connected to two unsolved murders with eerily similar circumstances from over the last year, the BAU attempts to determine whether or not the crimes were motivated by religious ideals. Meanwhile, an unexpected series of events puts the lives of Reid and Morgan in jeopardy.
210	24	"Demons"	Glenn Kershaw	Erica Messer	May 14, 2014	924	12.03
With Sheriff Coleman dead and Reid hospitalized following the shootout with now-deceased suspect Justin Mills (Brett Cullen), the remaining members of the BAU set out to take down a corrupt organization preparing to fulfill a sinister agenda. Meanwhile, Garcia inadvertently stumbles into the line of fire and Blake wrestles with a secret from her past.

== Ratings ==
=== U.S. ratings ===
No. in series	No. in season	Episode	Air date	Time slot (EST)	Rating/Share (18–49)	Viewers (m)	18-49 Rank	Viewership rank	Drama rank
187	1	"The Inspiration"	September 25, 2013	Wednesday; 9:00 P.M.	2.8/8	11.27	20	19	7
188	2	"The Inspired"	October 2, 2013	Wednesday; 9:00 P.M.	2.7/8	11.12	21	17	7
189	3	"Final Shot"	October 9, 2013	Wednesday; 9:00 P.M.	2.6/7	10.98	18	12	9
190	4	"To Bear Witness"	October 16, 2013	Wednesday; 9:00 P.M.	2.7/7	11.06	16	13	5
191	5	"Route 66"	October 23, 2013	Wednesday; 9:00 P.M.	2.7/7	11.55	17	14	5
192	6	"In the Blood"	October 30, 2013	Wednesday; 9:00 P.M.	2.4/6	10.64	19	14	6
193	7	"Gatekeeper"	November 6, 2013	Wednesday; 9:00 P.M.	2.3/6	9.70	22	19	8
194	8	"The Return"	November 13, 2013	Wednesday; 9:00 P.M.	2.7/8	11.63	13	13	5
195	9	"Strange Fruit"	November 20, 2013	Wednesday; 9:00 P.M.	2.8/8	12.40	13	19	3
196	10	"The Caller"	November 27, 2013	Wednesday; 9:00 P.M.	2.4/7	11.10	16	12	4
197	11	"Bully"	December 11, 2013	Wednesday; 9:00 P.M.	2.4/7	11.19	18	8	5
198	12	"The Black Queen"	January 15, 2014	Wednesday; 9:00 P.M.	2.4/7	10.35	13	12	5
199	13	"The Road Home"	January 22, 2014	Wednesday; 9:00 P.M.	2.2/6	10.35	14	9	3
200	14	"200"	February 5, 2014	Wednesday; 9:00 P.M.	2.8/7	12.92	13	10	3
201	15	"Mr. & Mrs. Anderson"	February 19, 2014	Wednesday; 9:00 P.M.	2.5/7	10.06	12	10	1
202	16	"Gabby"	February 26, 2014	Wednesday; 10:00 P.M.	2.2/6	9.42	24	18	6
203	17	"Persuasion"	March 5, 2014	Wednesday; 9:00 P.M.	2.6/7	11.42	11	9	4
204	18	"Rabid"	March 12, 2014	Wednesday; 9:00 P.M.	2.3/7	10.74	16	19	5
205	19	"The Edge of Winter"	March 19, 2014	Wednesday; 9:00 P.M.	2.2/6	10.14	12	10	7
206	20	"Blood Relations"	April 2, 2014	Wednesday; 9:00 P.M.	2.6/7	10.47	11	13	4
207	21	"What Happens In Mecklinburg..."	April 9, 2014	Wednesday; 9:00 P.M.	2.3/7	9.85	13	12	5
208	22	"Fatal"	April 30, 2014	Wednesday; 9:00 P.M.	2.2/6	10.30	12	12	3
209	23	"Angels"	May 7, 2014	Wednesday; 9:00 P.M.	2.3/7	10.52	10	8	5
210	24	"Demons"	May 14, 2014	Wednesday; 9:00 P.M.	2.7/8	12.03	5	5	1

=== Live + 7 Day (DVR) ratings ===
No. in series	No. in season	Episode	Air date	Time slot (EST)	18–49 rating increase	Viewers (millions) increase	Total 18-49	Total viewers (millions)	Ref
187	1	"The Inspiration"	September 25, 2013	Wednesday; 9:00 p.m.	1.3	3.60	4.1	14.87	
188	2	"The Inspired"	October 2, 2013	Wednesday; 9:00 p.m.	1.3	3.34	4.0	14.46	
189	3	"Final Shot"	October 9, 2013	Wednesday; 9:00 p.m.	1.3	3.31	3.9	14.28	
190	4	"To Bear Witness"	October 16, 2013	Wednesday; 9:00 p.m.	1.2	3.06	3.9	14.11	
191	5	"Route 66"	October 23, 2013	Wednesday; 9:00 p.m.	1.2	3.13	3.9	14.68	
192	6	"In the Blood"	October 30, 2013	Wednesday; 9:00 p.m.	1.3	3.30	3.7	13.94	
193	7	"Gatekeeper"	November 6, 2013	Wednesday; 9:00 p.m.	1.4	3.41	3.7	13.11	
194	8	"The Return"	November 13, 2013	Wednesday; 9:00 p.m.	1.2	3.25	3.9	14.87	
195	9	"Strange Fruit"	November 20, 2013	Wednesday; 9:00 p.m.	1.4	3.58	4.2	15.98	
196	10	"The Caller"	November 27, 2013	Wednesday; 9:00 p.m.	—N/a	—N/a	—N/a	—N/a	—N/a
197	11	"Bully"	December 11, 2013	Wednesday; 9:00 p.m.	1.4	3.49	3.8	14.69	
198	12	"The Black Queen"	January 15, 2014	Wednesday; 9:00 p.m.	1.5	3.82	3.9	14.21	
199	13	"The Road Home"	January 22, 2014	Wednesday; 9:00 p.m.	1.6	4.10	3.8	14.45	
200	14	"200"	February 5, 2014	Wednesday; 9:00 p.m.	1.2	3.48	4.0	16.39	
201	15	"Mr. & Mrs. Anderson"	February 19, 2014	Wednesday; 9:00 p.m.	1.3	3.59	3.8	13.65	
202	16	"Gabby"	February 26, 2014	Wednesday; 10:00 p.m.	—N/a	—N/a	—N/a	—N/a	—N/a
203	17	"Persuasion"	March 5, 2014	Wednesday; 9:00 p.m.	1.4	3.70	4.0	15.13	
204	18	"Rabid"	March 12, 2014	Wednesday; 9:00 p.m.	1.3	3.22	3.6	13.96	
205	19	"The Edge of Winter"	March 19, 2014	Wednesday; 9:00 p.m.	1.4	3.66	3.6	13.80	
206	20	"Blood Relations"	April 2, 2014	Wednesday; 9:00 p.m.	1.4	3.60	4.0	14.07	
207	21	"What Happens in Mecklinburg..."	April 9, 2014	Wednesday; 9:00 p.m.	1.3	3.32	3.6	13.17	
208	22	"Fatal"	April 30, 2014	Wednesday; 9:00 p.m.	1.4	3.71	3.6	14.01	
209	23	"Angels"	May 7, 2014	Wednesday; 9:00 p.m.	1.3	3.36	3.6	13.89	
210	24	"Demons"	May 14, 2014	Wednesday; 9:00 p.m.	1.2	3.39	3.9	15.42	

== Home media ==
The Complete Ninth Season
Set details		Special features
24 episodes; 6-disc set (Region 1); 5-disc set (Region 2 & 4); Aspect Ratio: 1.78:1; Subtitles: English; English: Dolby Digital 5.1		Eyes Only; Gag Reel; Deleted Scenes
DVD release date
Region 1	Region 2	Region 4
August 26, 2014	December 8, 2014	December 3, 2014
