= List of Criminal Minds characters =

Listing of characters on American television series Criminal Minds

This is a list of characters in the television series Criminal Minds, an American police procedural drama which premiered September 22, 2005, on CBS and concluded its original run on February 19, 2020. It is also shown on A&E and Ion Television in the United States. A nineteenth season of the show began airing on Paramount+ in May 2026.

== Main characters ==
=== Main ===
List indicator

This section includes characters who have appeared in the series as credited cast.

- An empty grey cell indicates the character was not in the season.

Legend
= Main cast (credited)
= Recurring cast (3+)
= Guest cast (1–2)

Actor	Character	Seasons																			
Actor	Character	Criminal Minds															Evolution				
Actor	Character	1	2	3	4	5	6	7	8	9	10	11	12	13	14	15	16	17	18	19	20
Mandy Patinkin	Jason Gideon	M (Note: Mandy Patinking is credited as a series regular through season 3 episode 2.)	M	M							(Note: Mentioned in 10.13, Gideon was murdered off-screen; Mandy Patinkin does not appear.)										
Thomas Gibson	Aaron Hotchner	M (Note: Thomas Gibson is credited as a series regular through season 12 episode 2.)	M	M	M	M	M	M	M	M	M	M	M								
Lola Glaudini	Elle Greenaway	M	M																		
Shemar Moore	Derek Morgan	M (Note: Shemar Moore is credited as a series regular through season 11 episode 18.)	M	M	M	M	M	M	M	M	M	M	SG	SG							
Matthew Gray Gubler	Spencer Reid	M	M	M	M	M	M	M	M	M	M	M	M	M	M	M			G		
A. J. Cook	Jennifer Jareau	M (Note: A.J. Cook only appeared as a member of the main cast in the first two episodes of season 6 and later appeared as a special guest star in two subsequent episodes of the season.)	M	M	M	M	M	M	M	M	M	M	M	M	M	M	M	M	M	M	M
Kirsten Vangsness	Penelope Garcia	Also Starring (Note: Kirsten Vangsness is credited as "Co-Starring" in episode 1 and "Guest Starring" from episodes 2 through 13. From episode 14 through 22 she is credited as "Also Starring")	M	M	M	M	M	M	M	M	M	M	M	M	M	M	M	M	M	M	M
Paget Brewster	Emily Prentiss		M (Note: Paget Brewster is credited as a series regular from season 2 episode 9 through season 6 episode 18 then returns in season 7 she returns as a series regular.)	M	M	M	M	M		SG		SG	M (Note: Paget Brewster is credited as a series regular from season 12 episode 3 onwards.)	M	M	M	M	M	M	M	M
Joe Mantegna	David Rossi			M (Note: Joe Mantegna appears as a series regular starting with season 3 episode 6.)	M	M	M	M	M	M	M	M	M	M	M	M	M	M	M	M	M
Rachel Nichols	Ashley Seaver						M														
Jeanne Tripplehorn	Alex Blake								M	M											
Jennifer Love Hewitt	Kate Callahan										M										
Aisha Tyler	Tara Lewis											R	M	M	M	M	M	M	M	M	M
Adam Rodriguez	Luke Alvez												M	M	M	M	M	M	M	M	M
Damon Gupton	Stephen Walker												M								
Daniel Henney	Matt Simmons										G		G	M	M	M					
RJ Hatanaka	Tyler Green																R	M	M	M	M
Zach Gilford	Elias Voit																R	M	M	M	

=== Current main characters ===
Name	Actor	Seasons	Occupation(s)
Jennifer "JJ" Jareau	A.J. Cook	1, 2, 3, 4, 5, 6, 7, 8, 9, 10, 11, 12, 13, 14, 15, 16, 17, 18, 19	BAU Supervisory Special Agent, Former BAU Communications Liaison
SSA Jennifer "JJ" Jareau originally acted as the team's Communication Liaison with the media and local police agencies and later turned to a full-time agent in the field after returning from the Pentagon. She has two sons with her now husband Detective William LaMontagne Jr. (Josh Stewart), whom she met while the team was working a case in New Orleans in the season two episode "Jones" and married at the end of the season seven two-part finale, "Hit and Run". In the second episode of season six, JJ was forced to take a promotion to the Pentagon and left the team for the rest of the season. When JJ leaves the BAU for a promotion to a position at the Pentagon, Garcia and Hotch take up her responsibilities as media liaison, and Garcia retains this position when JJ returns to the BAU as a profiler. Jennifer returned to the show in the episode entitled "Lauren", in which she receives a call and returns to help the BAU find Emily Prentiss and capture Ian Doyle before it is too late. When Emily is stabbed by Doyle and rushed to a hospital, Jennifer announces she did not survive. However, it is later revealed that Emily is alive and Jennifer meets her at a cafe in Paris, where she provides her with three passports and bank accounts to start a new life in hiding. She returns once again in the season six finale before returning as a main character again in season seven. In the finale of season 14, JJ reveals to Reid that she always loved him during a hostage situation. In season 15, episode 1 "Under the Skin" JJ was shot and rushed to hospital. She recovered after surgery and in episode 2 "Awakenings" JJ and Reid discussed the hostage situation where JJ admitted she loved Reid but she also loved Will and her kids. They both agreed to be friends. In 2015, the actress announced she was expecting her second child, which was written into JJ's storyline. The character's children are portrayed by A.J. Cook's real-life sons, Mekhai and Phoenix Andersen.
Penelope Garcia	Kirsten Vangsness	1, 2, 3, 4, 5, 6, 7, 8, 9, 10, 11, 12, 13, 14, 15, 16, 17, 18, 19	BAU Technical Analyst, BAU Special Agent, BAU Communications Director
SA Penelope Garcia, the BAU's technical analyst, has been present in the series since the first season. She is portrayed as a bubbly and kind character who often comforts her team and shares a playful, flirty, but platonic relationship with SSA Morgan. Penelope's mother remarried into the Garcia family, and she has a brother named Carlos. After losing her parents to a drunk driver, she embraced Mexican traditions from her stepfather's heritage despite being of English descent. Self-taught in hacking after dropping out of college, Garcia became one of the world's top underground hackers. When caught by the FBI, she was offered a choice: prison or working for the BAU as an analyst. In "Penelope," Garcia survives being shot, a pivotal moment in her storyline. After JJ's temporary departure, she briefly takes on the role of media liaison, adopting a new look but quickly realizing the job isn't for her. She resumes her analyst role, though she retains some liaison duties when JJ returns. Her background is explored in episodes like "The Black Queen," where flashbacks show her goth past and the guilt she feels over her hacking days. She even agrees to act as bait to catch her hacker ex-boyfriend, though she vows never to revisit that part of her life.
Emily Prentiss	Paget Brewster	2, 3, 4, 5, 6, 7, 9, 11, 12, 13, 14, 15, 16, 17 ,18, 19	FBI Section Chief, BAU Unit Chief, BAU Supervisory Special Agent, former Chief of London Interpol
SSA Emily Prentiss is the daughter of a U.S. ambassador and diplomat. She joins the BAU unexpectedly after Agent Elle Greenaway's departure, initially catching Hotch and Gideon off guard. Intelligent and fluent in multiple languages, Prentiss gradually becomes a core member of the team. Prentiss experienced many difficulties in her childhood, including social isolation, loneliness, and receiving an abortion at the age of 15. Prentiss's storyline takes a darker turn in Season 6 when her past at Interpol resurfaces. After receiving unsettling warnings and finding her home invaded, she discovers she is being targeted by her nemesis, Ian Doyle. Faking her death with help from Hotch and JJ, she temporarily leaves the team, returning in Season 7 to confront Doyle. By the season's end, she departs again to lead Interpol in London. She makes notable returns in the series, including the 200th episode to rescue SSA Jennifer Jareau and in Season 11 to assist with a serial killer case. After the termination of Thomas Gibson (actor of Aaron Hotchner), Brewster rejoined as a series regular in Season 12, assuming Hotch's previous role of Unit Chief. She was promoted to be the FBI Section Chief with oversight over the BAU at the end of Season 15.
David Rossi	Joe Mantegna	3, 4, 5, 6, 7, 8, 9, 10, 11, 12, 13, 14, 15, 16, 17, 18, 19	BAU Senior Supervisory Special Agent, Former BAU Unit Chief, Former Marine Sergeant Major
Senior SSA David Rossi, a "'founding father' of the BAU", was in early retirement from 1997 until his voluntary return to the BAU in 2007, replacing Jason Gideon, who had abruptly resigned from the BAU. He had retired in order to write books and go on lecture tours, but he returned to settle some unfinished business that was not immediately specified. It was later revealed that the case involved three young children whose parents had been murdered in a possible home-invasion case that had remained unsolved. This case haunted Rossi for twenty years and prompted him to return to the BAU, where he eventually solved it. He served in the Vietnam War and lost a close friend, which was revealed in a series of flashbacks.
Tara Lewis	Aisha Tyler	11, 12, 13, 14, 15, 16, 17, 18, 19	BAU Supervisory Special Agent, Former FBI Forensic Psychologist
SSA Dr. Tara Lewis is a forensic psychologist and Supervisory Special Agent in the BAU, introduced in Season 11 as a recurring character before becoming a series regular in Season 12. A highly intelligent and driven individual, Tara is known for her expertise in interviewing psychopathic criminals to assess their fitness for trial. Her background includes a challenging childhood marked by her father's military service, her mother's death from cancer, and bullying she endured while living in Germany. She shares a complicated relationship with her brother Gabriel, who became estranged after a series of personal conflicts. Tara's personal life is layered with complex relationships, including a brief marriage during her collegiate years, a failed engagement, and a current relationship with Rebecca Wilson from the Department of Justice. Tara is pansexual and openly discusses her past relationships with both men and women. Tara has faced numerous professional challenges, including surviving a near-fatal car crash orchestrated by Peter Lewis, profiling high-profile unsubs, and navigating the dissolution and reformation of the BAU.
Luke Alvez	Adam Rodriguez	12, 13, 14, 15, 16, 17, 18, 19	BAU Supervisory Special Agent, Former FBI Fugitive Task Force Agent, Former U.S. Army Ranger
Played by former CSI: Miami star Adam Rodriguez, Supervisory Special Agent Alvez is a profiler in the BAU who was previously a member of the FBI Fugitive Task Force who partnered with the BAU to catch the serial killers that escaped in the Season 11 finale. In the Season 12 premiere, he works with the BAU to catch the "Crimson King", one of the escapees who attacked Alvez's old partner. The team discovers the real killer is "Mr. Scratch," who taunts the team by turning over the real "Crimson King", who was tortured to the point he no longer remembered who he was. Alvez then decides to join the BAU full-time and was Hotch's last hire. Alvez has a dog named Roxy (whom Garcia thought at first was his human girlfriend) and served in Iraq as an Army Ranger prior to joining the FBI.
Tyler Green	Ryan-James Hatanaka	16, 17, 18, 19	FBI Agent, BAU Consultant, Former U.S. Army Drone Spotter
Tyler Green is a former military intelligence officer turned vigilante. Dishonorably discharged after posting drone strike aftermath videos online, Green's life took a dark turn when his sister, Alison, was murdered by serial killer Elias Voit. Consumed by grief and seeking justice, Green infiltrated Voit's network of serial killers, gathering evidence and attempting to lure Voit into a trap. Green's obsessive quest for revenge brought him into conflict with the BAU, particularly Penelope Garcia (who he also had romantic and sexual encounters with), to whom he anonymously provided information. Despite his defiance and mistrust of authority, Green ultimately collaborated with the team, sharing critical insights into Voit's operations while struggling with PTSD and guilt over his sister's death.
Elias Voit	Zach Gilford	16, 17, 18, 19	Serial-killer, Criminal, Former Network Security Analyst
Elias Jasper Voit, also known as "Sicarius," is the main antagonist of Criminal Minds: Evolution. A prolific and methodical serial killer, Voit operated a vast network of murderers across the U.S., using his expertise in encryption and manipulation to maintain control. Born Lee Duval, Voit endured severe childhood abuse that shaped his violent tendencies. He concealed his crimes behind a family life with an unsuspecting wife and daughters, while storing and torturing victims in hidden locations. During the COVID-19 pandemic, Voit expanded his operations by recruiting killers online, providing "kill kits" and guidance in exchange for financial support. His signature methods included diverse and brutal killings, from dismemberment to poisoning, with a recurring tactic of using spiders as a murder weapon. Driven by his psychopathy and need for control, Voit's intricate schemes brought him into direct conflict with the BAU.

=== Former main characters ===
Name	Actor	Seasons	Occupation(s)
Elle Greenaway	Lola Glaudini	1, 2	Former BAU Supervisory Special Agent
Played by Lola Glaudini, SSA Elle Greenaway was formerly assigned to FBI Field Office in Seattle, Washington, and was assigned to the BAU, being an expert in sexual offense crimes. Her father was a police officer but was killed in the line of duty. She is half Cuban and speaks Spanish. She is shot by an unsub.^{E122} Though she physically recovers, the event leaves her with psychological scars.^{E201} As a result of those scars, Elle begins acting even more harshly in season two, especially during a case involving a serial rapist.^{E205} Ultimately, she kills the suspect before he could even be properly arrested.^{E205} During this episode, she mentions that the unsub wrote on the wall with her blood from the wound.^{E205} She hands in her badge and gun in the episode "The Boogeyman", saying that it is not an admission of guilt.
Jason Gideon	Mandy Patinkin	1, 2, 3	Former BAU Senior Supervisory Special Agent
SSA Jason Gideon, one of the "founding fathers" of the BAU alongside Rossi, is considered having been the BAU's most skilled profiler. He helped Derek Morgan and Spencer Reid through their nightmares. He was shown to have a very close relationship with Reid, having hand-picked him from the FBI Academy for his team, helping Reid through many difficulties (including his implied drug use), and even leaving the good-bye letter for Reid to find. Gideon did not know Garcia well, as expressed through an episode wherein he is placed with her while he is on crutches; after they are placed, Penelope Garcia complains about him, and he doesn't know her name. Through the first two seasons, Gideon was portrayed to be very good at chess, winning against Reid many times (only exception being Reid's birthday^{E104}) and encouraging him to "think outside the box". Prior to the series, he was said to have had a "nervous breakdown" (or "major depressive episode") after he sent six men into a warehouse with a bomb in it; all six agents were killed, and he was heavily criticized about the event. He showed particular dislike for the practice of using religion as a defense or motivation for one's crimes. Gideon participated in some field operations during his time with the BAU and had the rest of his team "think outside the box" as well, as he made a major advance by shouting at the top of his lungs with pleas of mercy and, when questioned by his team, he said that the victims were being threatened to be kept quiet as neighbors would have heard the pleas if they were unrestrained. He blamed himself for the torture Reid received from Tobias Hankel as he had ordered Garcia to add a virus warning to the videos Hankel posted.^{E215} Gideon also had a son named Stephen (James Lentzsch).^{E111} The nature of their relationship has not been directly stated, but it was implied that they have not seen each other very recently. Gideon began to lose confidence in his profiling skills after Frank Breitkopf murdered his girlfriend, Sarah Jacobs. During his final case in Arizona, he further lost faith in his abilities when his decision to release the unsub resulted in the deaths of both the unsub and a young woman. As a result of his actions, Aaron Hotchner was suspended, which was the final straw for Gideon. He then left his cabin shortly afterwards, leaving his gun and badge behind along with a letter for Reid to find as he sought to regain a belief in happy endings. In the season ten episode "Nelson's Sparrow", Gideon was murdered off-screen, having been shot dead at a close range by a serial killer named Donnie Mallick (Arye Gross), which prompts the BAU team to investigate Gideon's murder. During the flashbacks focusing on a young version of him for the episode which show him working at the BAU in 1978, he is played by Ben Savage.
Ashley Seaver	Rachel Nichols	6	Former BAU Special Agent, Domestic Trafficking Task Force Agent
Played by Rachel Nichols, Ashley Seaver is an FBI cadet assigned to the BAU. Her father, Charles Beauchamp, was a horrific serial killer from North Dakota known as "the Redmond Ripper" who killed 25 women over the course of 10 years before Ashley was a teenager. He was caught by David Rossi and Aaron Hotchner. Because North Dakota does not have capital punishment, he was sentenced to life in prison. She has not been to see him. Though he writes to her sometimes, she never reads his letters, though she does keep them and admittedly still finds herself unable to hate him for what he did. In the episode "What Happens at Home", the BAU investigate a series of murders in a gated community and bring Ashley along because of her understanding of the family dynamics of a serial killer. In the end, the suspect commits suicide by cop in front of her. In the next episode, she requests that the rest of her remedial training be done with the BAU and is attached to the team. In the season seven premiere "It Takes a Village", it was revealed that Ashley transferred to the Domestic Trafficking Task Force, which is led by Andi Swann.
Alex Blake	Jeanne Tripplehorn	8, 9	Former BAU Supervisory Special Agent
SSA Dr. Alex Blake is a forensic linguist who joins the BAU in season eight, replacing SSA Emily Prentiss. A former FBI agent, she rejoined in 2012 to restore her reputation after being unfairly blamed for mistakes in the Amerithrax case, for which Section Chief Erin Strauss let her take the fall. Though her arrival was met with mixed reactions, the team came to respect her expertise. Blake and Strauss initially clashed but later reconciled before Strauss's death. Blake faced significant challenges during her tenure, including being targeted by "The Replicator," a serial killer and disgraced former FBI agent connected to her past. The Replicator killed Strauss and nearly the entire team before being stopped. Blake, a Berkeley graduate with a PhD, also teaches forensic linguistics at Georgetown University and speaks American Sign Language.^{E801} Her personal life includes estrangement from her family after the deaths of her older brother Danny, a police officer, and her mother. She reconciles with her father and younger brother, Scott, during a case in Kansas City. Blake's emotional depth is revealed in season nine when Reid saves her from being shot and is critically injured himself. The case stirs painful memories of her late son Ethan, who died at age nine from a neurological disease. At the end of the "Demons", she sits apart from the rest of the group on the plane ride home, and it is implied that she sends a text message to Hotch to hand in her resignation. After taking Reid home, telling him about Ethan, and departing, Reid finds her FBI badge in his bag, and watches her leave, saddened but accepting, from his window.
Kate Callahan	Jennifer Love Hewitt	10	Former BAU Supervisory Special Agent
Played by former Ghost Whisperer star Jennifer Love Hewitt, Kate Callahan has been in the FBI for eight years and has experience as an undercover agent, which has allowed her to establish a prior friendship with members of the BAU. Her sister and brother-in-law were killed in the September 11 attacks, leaving Kate as the legal guardian of their infant daughter, Meg, whom she raised for thirteen years along with her husband, Chris. This tragedy shaped her patriotic attitude. She is described as "smart, charming, and wise for her years" and holds a passion for making the world safer, according to showrunner Erica Messer. In the episode "Breath Play", Kate reveals she is pregnant. In the season ten finale, "The Hunt", Meg is abducted by human traffickers who are connected to a previous case that Kate had researched. Though Meg is eventually brought back safe, Kate decides to take a year off to spend with Meg, Chris, and her soon-to-be-born child. She is succeeded by SSA Dr. Tara Lewis in the next season.
Derek Morgan	Shemar Moore	1, 2, 3, 4, 5, 6, 7, 8, 9, 10, 11, 12, 13	Former BAU Supervisory Special Agent
Played by former The Young and the Restless star Shemar Moore, SSA Derek Morgan is a confident and assertive everyman character, the son of an African-American father and white mother. He went to Northwestern University on a football scholarship, holds a black belt in judo, runs FBI self-defense classes, and served in a bomb squad unit and as a Chicago police officer. In season two it was explained that after the death of his father when he was ten, Derek struggled somewhat: youthful fighting earned him a juvenile offender record. He was taken under the wing of a local youth center coordinator, Carl Buford (Julius Tennon), who acted as a surrogate father to Derek and helped him to obtain a college football scholarship, but also sexually abused him, as revealed in the episode "Profiler, Profiled." In season three, it is revealed that he hates religion and had resentment toward God and the church due to this experience. During this season, he prays for the first time in 20 years. Former Unit Chief Aaron Hotchner promotes him to unit chief in his place, a promotion Derek saw as only temporary until the "Boston Reaper" was captured. Aaron again takes his place as unit chief when he returns after grieving over his ex-wife's murder. In season 10, Derek resigns to care for his family.
Aaron Hotchner	Thomas Gibson	1, 2, 3, 4, 5, 6, 7, 8, 9, 10, 11, 12	Former BAU Unit Chief, Former BAU Supervisory Special Agent
SSA Aaron "Hotch" Hotchner was the Unit Chief of the BAU from Season 1 to Season 12. Before joining the FBI, he worked as a prosecutor and was initially assigned to the Seattle field office. Hotchner eventually rose to lead the BAU, but his tenure was marked by personal and professional challenges. Hotch was married to Haley Brooks, with whom he had a son, Jack. Though their marriage ended in divorce, they remained on amicable terms until Haley was murdered by George Foyet, a Boston-based serial killer known as "The Reaper." This left a substantial strain on Hotch's well-being. When Jennifer "JJ" Jareau briefly left the team for a Pentagon promotion, Hotch and Penelope Garcia stepped in to handle her responsibilities as media liaison, a role Garcia retained upon JJ's return as a profiler. In later seasons, Hotch began a romantic relationship with Beth Clemmons, showcasing his efforts to rebuild his personal life after Haley's death. Throughout the series, Hotch is portrayed as stoic and reserved, rarely smiling except in moments with his son. His departure from the BAU came after serial killer Peter Lewis, known as "Mr. Scratch," began stalking Jack, prompting Hotch to enter witness protection to ensure his son's safety. The character was abruptly written out of the series following Thomas Gibson's dismissal after an on-set physical altercation with one of the show's writers.
Stephen Walker	Damon Gupton	12	Former BAU Supervisory Special Agent
Played by actor and conductor Damon Gupton, Walker is a Supervisory Special Agent with the BAU. Walker was a member of the Behavioral Analysis Program. He was contacted by Emily Prentiss about joining the BAU to assist in the manhunt for Peter Lewis, a.k.a. "Mr. Scratch". Walker is an experienced profiler, with about twenty years under his belt, and a member of the FBI's Behavioral Analysis Program before his transfer to the BAU. He is married to a woman named Monica and has two children with her, Maya and Eli. He met Emily Prentiss, then the chief of Interpol's London office, during his line of work. He was also mentored by David Rossi. Stephen's first case concerned a terrorist cell in Belgium, and three agents were sent undercover to infiltrate it. However, Stephen's profile was wrong, and this resulted in the deaths of the undercover agents. He eventually moved on from the trauma and improved as he went along in his career. He and other BAP agents, including his longtime friend Sam Bower, were sent undercover to investigate corruption in the Russian government. Walker's skills include being fluent in Russian and playing the trombone. In "Wheels Up", Walker dies from injuries during a car accident with a semi-truck by Peter Lewis a.k.a. Mr. Scratch.
Matt Simmons	Daniel Henney	10, 12, 13, 14, 15	Former BAU Supervisory Special Agent
Played by Daniel Henney, SSA Matthew "Matt" Simmons is a Special Operations agent and special agent with the IRT. Simmons is married to his wife Kristy (Kelly Frye) and has a total of four young children, including sons Jake and David and twin daughters Lily and Chloe. Like Garrett, Simmons' full and fulfilling family life was a deliberate choice. Through his job, Simmons has some prior history with Derek Morgan and JJ of the FBI's Behavioral Analysis Unit. He was a former member of a Special Ops unit, and his experience with the unit allowed him to hone his profiling skills.
Spencer Reid	Matthew Gray Gubler	1, 2, 3, 4, 5, 6, 7, 8, 9, 10, 11, 12, 13, 14, 15, 18	BAU Supervisory Special Agent (on sabbatical)
For the American-Samoan football player, see Spencer Reid. SSA Dr. Spencer Reid is a genius who graduated from Las Vegas High School at age 12. Reid's mother, Diana Reid (Jane Lynch), has schizophrenia and was sent to a mental hospital by Spencer himself when he turned 18. He is almost always introduced as Dr. Reid, even though the others are introduced as agents because SSA Jason Gideon understood that people would not otherwise take Spencer seriously because of his young age. After an introduction, he never shakes hands. It has been revealed that he holds Ph.D.s in Mathematics, Chemistry, and Engineering, B.A.s in Psychology and Sociology, and is working on a B.A. in philosophy. Spencer is known for having an IQ of 187 and has an eidetic memory. Around the office, Reid often interrupts others' sentences with facts.^{E408} Matthew Gray Gubler confirmed that Reid is autistic. In many episodes, Dr. Reid can be seen visiting his mother in her Las Vegas Mental Help/Nursing Home. In Season 4, "Memoriam", Reid experiences nightmares of a young boy being murdered, revealed to be based on a real murder case, and that his baseball coach, his mother, and his father were involved, some criminally (his baseball coach), and some not criminally (his parents). Matthew Gray Gubler has been known for his many hairstyles throughout the show. Reid has also said that he was bullied when he was younger. Through the seasons Reid has faced many near-death experiences and even had to be resuscitated while being held captive, tortured, and drugged by Tobias Hankel (unsub from season 2 episode 15). Reid had made some attempts in finding love but only to have his girlfriend killed in front of him by her stalker, and later on to be terrorized by Cat Adam's top hit-woman, who framed Spencer for murder, sending him to prison.

== Recurring ==
Actor/Actress	Character	Seasons																		
Actor/Actress	Character	Criminal Minds															Evolution			
Actor/Actress	Character	1	2	3	4	5	6	7	8	9	10	11	12	13	14	15	16	17	18	19
Meredith Monroe	Haley Hotchner	R	R	R		R				G										
Brian Appel	Agent Grant Anderson	R	R	G		R	R	R		R	G	G			G					
Gonzalo Menendez	Agent Josh Cramer	G	G																	
Jane Lynch	Diana Reid	G	R		R								R			R				
Gina Garcia Sharp	Agent Gina Sharp	G	R		G	R		R		G	G	G				G				
Josh Stewart	William LaMontagne Jr.		G	R	G	R		R	G	G		G	G	G	R	R	R		G	
Jayne Atkinson	Erin Strauss		G	R		R	R	R	R	G						G				
Cade Owens	Jack Hotchner			R	G	R	R	R	R	R	R	G								
Nicholas Brendon	Kevin Lynch			R	R	R	R	R	R	G	G									
Gia Mantegna	Lindsey Vaughn			G									R							
Jamie Kennedy	Floyd Feylinn Ferell			G										G						
Meta Golding	Jordan Todd				R															
C. Thomas Howell	George Foyet/The Reaper				R	R				G						G				
Salli Richardson	Tamara Barnes					R														
Mekhai Andersen	Henry LaMontagne					G		R	R	G	G	G	G		G	G	G		G	R
Tim Curry	Billy Flynn					G	G													
Isabella Murad	Ellie Spicer					G	R													
Sebastian Roché	Clyde Easter						R	R												
Siena Goines	Tsia Mosely						R													
Timothy V. Murphy	Ian Doyle						R	G												
Bellamy Young	Beth Clemmons							R	R											
Candy Clark	Sandy Jareau							G			G				G					
Beth Riesgraf	Maeve Donovan								R				G			G				
Esai Morales	Mateo Cruz									R	G									
Rochelle Aytes	Savannah Morgan									R	R	R								
Hailey Sole	Meg Callahan										R									
Greg Grunberg	Chris Callahan										R									
Taylor Mosby	Markayla Davis										R									
Amber Stevens	Joy Struthers										R	G			G					
Bodhi Elfman	Peter Lewis/Mr.Scratch										G	G	R	G						
Marisol Nichols	Agent Natalie Colfax											R								
Frances Fisher	Antonia Slade											R								
Sheryl Lee Ralph	Hayden Montgomery											R								
Aubrey Plaza	Cat Adams											G	R			G				
Phoenix Andersen	Michael LaMontagne											G			G	G	G		G	R
Angela Robinson Witherspoon	Cassie Campbell												R							
Richard T. Jones	Lionel Wilkins												R							
Jeananne Goossen	Fiona Duncan												R							
Harold Perrineau	Calvin Shaw												R							
Tracie Thoms	Monica Walker												G	G						
Kelly Frye	Kristy Simmons													R	R	R				
Kim Rhodes	Linda Barnes													R						
Daniella Alonso	Lisa Douglas													G	R					
Gail O'Grady	Krystall Rossi													G	R	R	G			
Danielle C. Ryan	Portia Richards													G	R					
Declan Whaley	David Simmons													G	G	G				
James Urbaniak	Owen Quinn													G	G					
Karen David	Mary Meadows													G	G					
Michael Hogan	Benjamin David Merva													G	G					
Stephen Bishop	Andrew Mendoza														R	R				
Michael Mosley	Everett Lynch														G	R				
Sharon Lawrence	Roberta Lynch														G	R				
Alex Jennings	Grace Lynch														G	R				
Rachael Leigh Cook	Maxine Brenner															R				
Joseph C. Phillips	James Barbour															R				
Paul F. Tompkins	Brian Garrity															G		G		R
Nicholas D'Agosto	Deputy Director Doug Bailey																R	G		
Nicole Pacent	Rebecca Wilson																R	R	R	R
Kiele Sanchez	Sydney Voit																R	G		
Liana Liberato	Jade Waters																	R		
David Garelik	Damien Booth																	R		
Brian White	Vincent Orlov																	R		
Aimee Garcia	Dr. Julia Ochoa																		R	
Geoff Stults	Evan Delray																		R	
Connor Storrie	Lance Kingston																			R
Jessi Case	Laura Boyd																			R
Justin Kirk	James Crowley																			R

=== Recurrent ===
==== Agent Grant Anderson ====
Played by Brian Appel, Agent Anderson appears in "Plain Sight" (episode 1.4)", The Fisher King" (1.22 and 2.1), "The Big Game" (2.14), as well as "Honor Among Thieves" (2.20), "The Crossing" (3.18), "100" (5.9), "The Slave of Duty" (5.10), "Hope" (7.8), "Hit" (7.23), "Run" (7.24), "Carbon Copy" (8.16), "The Replicator" (8.24), "To Bear Witness" (9.4), and "200" (9.14). Agent Anderson is told to drive Elle home in "The Fisher King", and he drops her off at her front door and leaves. She was soon shot by The Fisher King, as he had already been there, waiting for her. Hotch scolds Anderson briefly for not doing more, and quickly sends him back to the scene of the crime.

==== Agent Josh Cramer ====
Played by Gonzalo Menendez, Agent Josh Cramer runs the FBI Field Office in Baltimore, Maryland, as well as the Organized Crime division in that city. The two episodes which take place in Baltimore, "Natural Born Killer" (1.8) and "Honor Among Thieves" (2.20) both have him liaising with the BAU.

==== Diana Reid ====
As played by Jane Lynch, Diana Reid is Dr. Spencer Reid's mother. She first appears as a potential target of serial killer Randall Garner, the man who shoots SSA Elle Greenaway.^{E122} Like her son, Diana has a genius level IQ. She was once a university literature professor, but is no longer since her diagnosis of schizophrenia. She currently resides at the Las Vegas-based Bennington Sanitarium, where Spencer committed her when he was eighteen. Her husband, William Reid, left her when Spencer was a child. The reason William left is because he was aware Diana witnessed a murder, as a family friend avenged his own son's murder. He was unable to live with this knowledge though he claims he tried; he said "the weight of knowing what happened was just too much". Much of Diana and Spencer's time while he was growing up was spent with her reading to him. Spencer writes her a letter every single day because he feels guilty about not visiting her. In season 11, Spencer takes some time off from the BAU to visit her. In "Entropy", he reveals she has early signs of dementia and when he first walked in her room, she didn't know who he was for three seconds.

==== Kevin Lynch ====
Played by Nicholas Brendon, Kevin was Penelope Garcia's replacement when she was briefly suspended and hospitalized.^{E309} He is a former hacker like her, but he is far messier. Garcia is denied access to her system during her suspension from the BAU. Kevin takes over in the interim. He is immediately impressed with the system she has set up and her GUI. Garcia attempts to hack into the database under his watch. Kevin is unable to block her. They are each impressed with the other's work, but Garcia establishes dominance. When they finally meet face-to-face, they fall in love instantly. Kevin remains in awe of Garcia. They've developed a dating relationship in spite of Garcia's "special" relationship/mutual admiration with Agent Morgan. This is revealed at the beginning of "Damaged", when Agent Rossi shows up at Garcia's apartment only to find the quirky twosome showering together.^{E314} In the Season 6 finale, "Supply & Demand", they profess their love for each other. Later in the show Penelope brings him in for a case in Season 6.

==== William LaMontagne Jr. ====
Played by Josh Stewart, LaMontagne is the husband of Special Agent Jennifer Jareau. He is a homicide detective who worked for the New Orleans Police Department and is now with the Metro PD. In the season two episode "Jones", it is revealed that his father William Sr. was a detective himself in the NOPD and was killed during Hurricane Katrina as he was working a case in his home and refused to leave during the mass evacuations. The case later resurfaced and LaMontagne enlisted the help of the BAU.^{E218} While they were there, he and JJ became romantically involved, although he wasn't mentioned again until "In Heat". In that episode, he was brought to Miami where the unsub had killed a friend and colleague of his. During the episode, it was revealed that he and JJ had been secretly contacting each other since "Jones". JJ didn't want to reveal their relationship since she believed it would complicate their personal lives, but in the end, they went public with it. At the end of the episode, it is revealed that Prentiss, Morgan and Reid already knew about it. In the episode "The Crossing", JJ discovered she was pregnant and they have a boy named Henry. The actual status of JJ and Will's relationship (engaged, married, etc.) has not been disclosed, though they exchanged rings with Henry's birthstone in season four. In the season three finale, it is revealed that he transferred to Metro to move to Virginia to be with JJ and raise Henry together. To conclude season seven, he and JJ marry in a small ceremony in David Rossi's back yard.

The character was written back in after A.J. Cook told the writers she was pregnant, and as such JJ needed a love interest. In addition, one of the original plans for the season seven finale was to kill off Will. However, this idea was scrapped due to Paget's impending departure.

==== Jack Hotchner ====
Played by Cade Owens, Jack Hotchner is the son of series regular Aaron Hotchner, his first appearance being in "The Fox". His mother, Haley Hotchner, is killed in season five by George Foyet (a.k.a. "The Boston Reaper") but is spared when his father gives him a secret signal to "work the case" (hide in the trunk in Hotch's office). It is shown in season seven's "Painless" that Jack is being bullied. Jack is shown to have become good friends with Beth Clemmons, his father's new girlfriend.

==== Lindsey Vaughan ====
Played by Gia Mantegna (Joe Mantegna's daughter), Lindsey Vaughan is the daughter of a hitman and first appears in the season three episode 3rd Life. The BAU initially believe her to be a victim of "Jack" until they track her to a school and discover that she is a willing accomplice, input under the witness protection program after a hit ordered by Irish mobsters designed to kill her father wound up killing her mother instead. She reappears in season twelve as Diana Reid's nurse using the name Dr. Carol Atkinson. Reid immediately recognises her as Lindsey Vaughan and later remembers that she was Mr. Scratch's accomplice from the hotel in Mexico but is taken back to his cell before he can warn Diana, later being revealed that she is the accomplice, and girlfriend, of Cat Adams.

==== Henry LaMontagne ====
Played by Mekhai Andersen (A.J. Cook's son), Henry LaMontagne is the first son of Jennifer Jareau and William LaMontagne Jr., his first appearance being in "100".

==== Mateo Cruz ====
Played by Esai Morales, Cruz is the new Section Chief of the BAU. All that is known about him is that he worked at the Pentagon prior to season nine and has a past with JJ.

It was revealed in "200" that the two had worked on a task force together in the Middle East. He was the only person to know of her pregnancy and her miscarriage during her time on the task force. In the same episode, they are both kidnapped by Tavin Askari, who was a traitor within the task force. They are both physically and mentally tortured into giving the access codes given to them during the mission. He is shocked to discover that Michael Hastings, one of the men they had worked with on the task force, was the mastermind behind the plan and threatened to rape JJ in order to give him the access codes. He gives in and is later stabbed by Askari, who was quickly killed by Hotch. Cruz is taken to the hospital following the incident and survives. Cruz later appears in the season nine finale "Demons", where he accepts a case from the sheriff who is a personal friend. When the sheriff is killed and Reid is shot, both Cruz and Garcia fly to Texas to meet with the rest of the team. He is next seen in the pilot episode for the upcoming spinoff, entitled Criminal Minds: Beyond Borders, which was the nineteenth episode of season ten. He enlists the BAU to help the international team find a vicious international killer in Barbados.

==== Joy Struthers ====
Played by Amber Stevens West, Joy is Rossi's daughter from his short-lived second marriage to French diplomat Hayden Montgomery. When they divorced, Hayden didn't tell him she was pregnant and Joy thought her father was her mother's second husband, who finally told her the truth before dying from cancer. In the episode "Fate" (10x09), Joy sought Rossi out and they're getting to know each other. Joy is a reporter and true crime writer and is married with a 2-year-old son named Kai.

=== Former ===
==== Erin Strauss ====
Played by Jayne Atkinson, Erin Strauss was the BAU Section Chief, the direct superior to SSA Aaron Hotchner. Her job lies in administration, and she has little field experience. She is an alcoholic, as revealed in the seventh-season episode "Self-Fulfilling Prophecy" when she rants at the commandant of a military academy and Morgan smells alcohol on her breath. At the end of the episode, Hotchner and Morgan arrange for her to check in privately at a treatment facility, thus protecting her from losing her job.

Strauss becomes more prominent in season eight. It is revealed in "The Silencer" that the newest member of the BAU team, Alex Blake, worked with her during the Amerithrax case, during which Strauss left her to take the fall when a linguistics flub led to the arrest of the wrong suspect. As a result, Blake did not get along with her afterwards. At the end of "The Silencer", Strauss tries apologizing to her, but Blake turns Strauss down. In "Carbon Copy", she specifically oversees the investigation into the Replicator, and by the end of the episode, she apologizes to Blake again, and this time, her apology is accepted. In "Brothers Hotchner", she is abducted by the Replicator, later revealed to be a former FBI agent named John Curtis, whom she left to take the blame along with Blake following the Amerithrax case. In "The Replicator", Erin Strauss is killed in the line of duty when Curtis poisons her with spiked wine and leaves her to die. She is found on the streets by Hotch, and she admits that the Replicator forced her at gunpoint to drink again. She dies in Hotch's arms after begging him to stay with her as she does not want to die alone. Strauss indirectly helps defeat Curtis post mortem when Rossi uses her sobriety chip to escape his trap, leaving him to possibly die in an explosion. After her funeral, the team celebrates her life during dinner at Rossi's garden, recalling her expert pistol marksmanship, discussing happy stories of her time with them, and acknowledging her as a good person.

==== Haley Hotchner ====
Played by Meredith Monroe, Haley Hotchner was the wife of Aaron Hotchner. She and Hotchner have a son, Jack.^{E204} They divorced due to Hotch's job and duties. In season three, Aaron Hotchner picks up his home phone when someone calls, but when he answers it, the caller hangs up. Haley's cellphone starts ringing immediately afterward. Hotch looks at Haley, but she does not say anything. It is implied that Haley might be cheating on Aaron, and that is why the person who called the home phone did not speak when a man answered. In the season five premiere episode, after George Foyet (a.k.a. "The Boston Reaper") shoots and stabs Aaron unconscious and puts him in the hospital, it is discovered by him that Foyet knows where Haley and Jack live, and they are placed in witness protection, later revealed to be living in New Jersey. Afterwards, Foyet stalks Sam Kassmeyer, the U.S. Marshall protecting Haley and Jack, somehow gets into his house after he comes home from work, and brutally tortures him to try to get him to reveal their location. In spite of being tortured and nearly dead at the scene (he would die shortly on the way to the hospital), Kassmeyer does not reveal their location. However, Foyet then notices Kassmeyer's work cell phone on a small table next to his living room sofa that he put down after coming in, and guesses correctly that he has phone numbers (not listed as actual phone numbers) on speed dial and dials several asking for "Haley." After several unsuccessful attempts, he finally manages to get Haley's cell number and she answers that it is her. Foyet apologizes for using her real name, then poses as a Marshall, tells her that Kassmeyer has been killed, that her location may have been compromised, that they need to protect her son, and that Aaron is dead. Overwhelmed with fear, Haley then puts her complete trust in him. Foyet further tells her not to call anyone after they're through talking, that her calls may be intercepted, to buy a disposable phone, and call him on it after getting into her vehicle; and that he would give her another number to call him on as well as further instructions on what to do before reassuring her that everything would be fine if she followed his instructions and that he was telling her the truth about Aaron. He later tells her to go to the Hotchner's house before their divorce and before she and her son were placed in protection and that he would meet her there. Despite the highly questionable instructions, Haley follows them completely. She discovers the truth about the situation when Aaron is able to reach her by cell phone with her, Foyet, and Jack in the living room. Jack, as mentioned above, is able to go into hiding and later emerges safely after Aaron talks in code with him over the phone, but after an emotional goodbye Aaron and Haley over it, Foyet shoots and brutally kills her.^{E509} Haley returned in season nine, episode five, in a vision while Hotch was recovering from complications from his stabbing 100 episodes earlier.^{E905} ^{E501}

==== Jordan Todd ====
Played by Meta Golding, Todd is JJ's replacement while she's on maternity leave. She was introduced to the team in Catching Out^{E405} and was mentored and trained by JJ until JJ went into labor.^{E407} Prior to that, she had spent 7 years working for the FBI's counter-terrorism unit. In the end, she announced that she would return there and that JJ would end her maternity leave and return to the team.^{E413}

==== Dr. Savannah Morgan ====
Played by Rochelle Aytes, Savannah Morgan (née Hayes) is Derek Morgan's wife. She works as a doctor at Bethesda General Hospital. Savannah first appeared in Season Nine's "The Return", and it is presumed that Morgan and Savannah started dating prior to Season Nine and first met after she approached him when he was depressed over a case that ended badly. Before they started dating, they used to be neighbors. She was introduced to the show because Shemar Moore, the actor who portrays Morgan, had requested that his character get a romantic partner. She was last seen giving birth to her and Derek's son, Hank Spencer Morgan, after being shot by Chazz Montolo.

==== Peter Lewis ====
Played by Bodhi Elfman, Peter Lewis (AKA Mr. Scratch) is a proxy killer who poisons his victims, causing them to kill people for him. He is first hunted by the BAU in season 10. He escapes from prison in season 11 and continues killing in season 12. He also stalked SSA Aaron Hotchner's son, Jack, forcing them to go into witness protection. In the season 13 premiere, "Wheels Up," he is cornered by the team and falls to his death off the edge of a building.
