= Criminal Minds season 15 =

Season of television series Criminal Minds

Criminal Minds
- Season 15
- Season 15 U.S. DVD cover
- Starring: Joe Mantegna; Matthew Gray Gubler; A. J. Cook; Kirsten Vangsness; Aisha Tyler; Daniel Henney; Adam Rodriguez; Paget Brewster
- No. of episodes: 10

Release
- Original network: CBS
- Original release: January 8 – February 19, 2020

Season chronology
- ← Previous; Season 14 Next → Season 16

The fifteenth season of Criminal Minds was ordered on January 10, 2019, with an order of 10 episodes. The season premiered on January 8, 2020, and concluded on February 19, 2020.

It was the final season to air on CBS, and was intended to be the final season overall. Two years later, Criminal Minds returned for a sixteenth season in 2022 on Paramount+.

== Cast ==
The entire main cast from the previous season returned.

=== Main ===
- Joe Mantegna as Supervisory Special Agent David Rossi (BAU Senior Agent)
- Matthew Gray Gubler as Supervisory Special Agent Dr. Spencer Reid (BAU Agent)
- A. J. Cook as Supervisory Special Agent Jennifer "JJ" Jareau (BAU Agent)
- Kirsten Vangsness as Special Agent Penelope Garcia (BAU Technical Analyst & Co-Communications Liaison)
- Aisha Tyler as Supervisory Special Agent Dr. Tara Lewis (BAU Agent)
- Daniel Henney as Supervisory Special Agent Matt Simmons (BAU Agent)
- Adam Rodriguez as Supervisory Special Agent Luke Alvez (BAU Agent)
- Paget Brewster as Supervisory Special Agent Emily Prentiss (BAU Unit Chief & Co-Communications Liaison)

=== Guest ===
- Jane Lynch as Diana Reid
- Aubrey Plaza as Cat Adams
- Ben Savage as Young Jason Gideon
- Beth Riesgraf as Dr. Maeve Donovan
- Jayne Atkinson as Erin Strauss
- C. Thomas Howell as George Foyet

=== Recurring ===
- Josh Stewart as William "Will" LaMontagne Jr.
- Mekhai Andersen as Henry LaMontagne
- Kelly Frye as Kristy Simmons
- Declan Whaley as David Simmons
- Stephen Bishop as Andrew Mendoza
- Michael Mosley as Everett Lynch
- Sharon Lawrence as Roberta Lynch
- Alex Jennings as Grace Lynch
- Rachael Leigh Cook as Maxine Brenner
- Gail O'Grady as Krystall Rossi
- Joseph C. Phillips as Deputy Director James Barbour

== Production ==
=== Development ===
Criminal Minds was renewed for a fifteenth and final season with an episode order of 10 episodes on January 10, 2019. It was revealed that the final season had been held for mid-season and would premiere on January 8, 2020, in its original time slot with a two-hour season premiere and the season would wrap up with a two-hour series finale.

Production on the final season began in the spring of 2019 as Erica Messer, the showrunner, wanted production on season fourteen and fifteen to be continuous with no break in between.

On April 26, 2019, it was revealed that Kirsten Vangsness and showrunner Erica Messer would be co-writing the series finale, with long-time director and executive producer, Glenn Kershaw directing. This was the fifth episode they co-wrote together. It was also revealed that the episode would be titled "And in the End". The title comes from The Beatles song "The End" ("And in the end… the love you take is equal to the love you make…"). Messer and Vangsness chose that as the title because "those were the final lyrics ever recorded by the Beatles, a group the characters always loved."

Former showrunner, Edward Allen Bernero, directed the fourth episode of the season "Saturday".

=== Casting ===
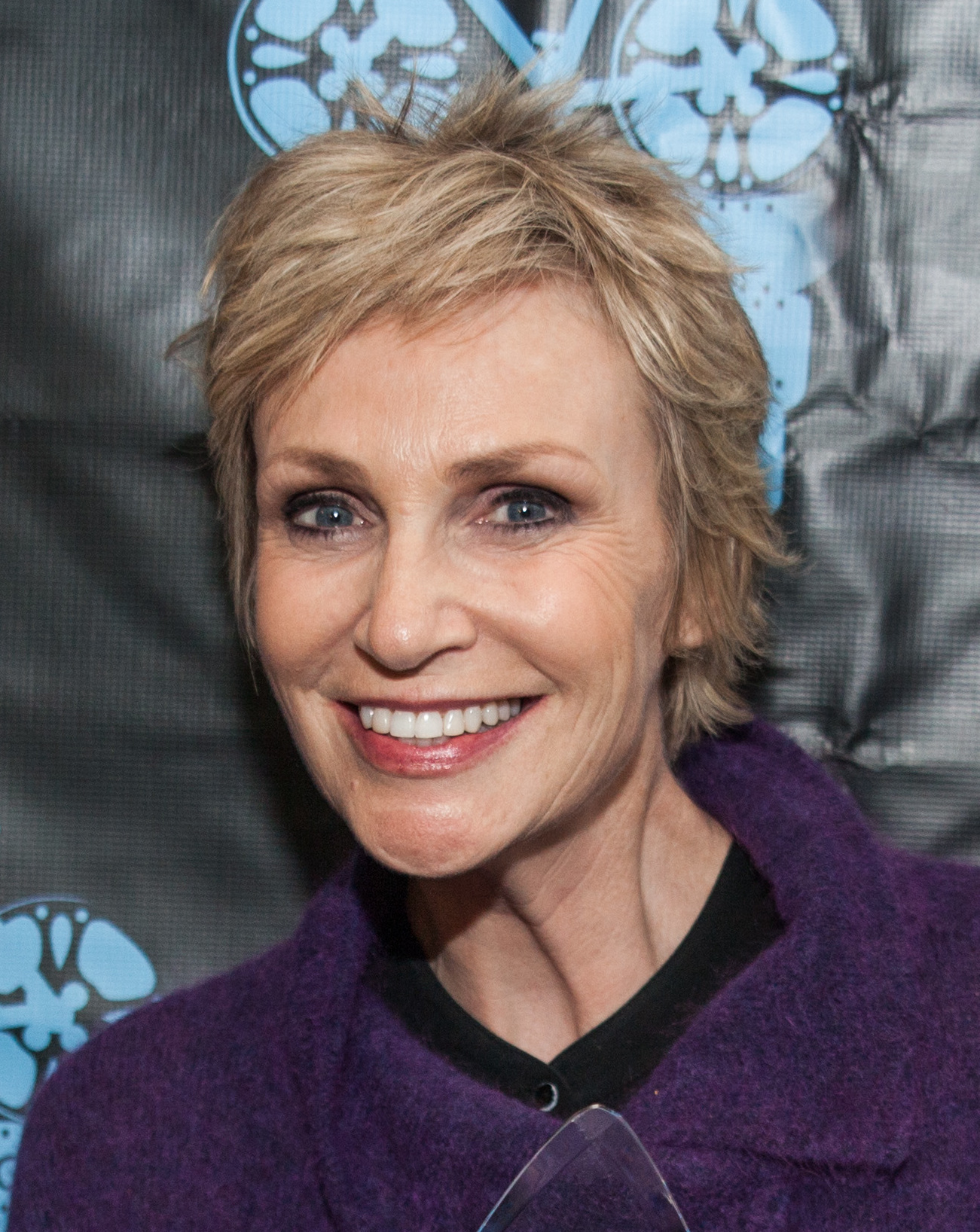
Jane Lynch returned in Season 15 as Diana Reid.

On February 4, 2019, it was announced that Jane Lynch would reprise her role as Diana Reid, the mother of Spencer Reid. Later that month, it was announced that Rachael Leigh Cook had been cast in a recurring role as Max, who is a love interest for Reid. Max is described as "a quirky, kind-hearted, candid woman who strikes up an unusual relationship" with Reid.

Aubrey Plaza reprises her role as Cat Adams in the sixth episode "Date Night".

It was revealed that Jayne Atkinson, C. Thomas Howell and Beth Riesgraf would reprise their roles as Erin Strauss, George Foyet and Maeve Donovan in the series finale. Ben Savage would also reprise his role as young Jason Gideon.

Thomas Gibson, who played Aaron Hotchner, would not be returning for the final season.

Messer revealed that Shemar Moore, who played Derek Morgan, would also not be returning for the final season.

== Episodes ==
No. overall	No. in season	Title	Directed by	Written by	Original release date	Prod. code	U.S. viewers (millions)
315	1	"Under the Skin"	Nelson McCormick	Christopher Barbour	January 8, 2020	1416	4.82
When mutilated bodies appear in the Washington metropolitan area, Rossi becomes convinced they are the work of Everett Lynch (Michael Mosley), otherwise known as "The Chameleon", the serial killer who nearly killed him and then disappeared. Meanwhile, Reid and JJ struggle in dealing with an awkward situation.
316	2	"Awakenings"	Alec Smight	Stephanie Sengupta	January 8, 2020	1417	4.49
With a member of the BAU in the hospital following a confrontation with Everett Lynch, the team continues their manhunt for him and his daughter Grace (Alex Jennings). Meanwhile, Reid, still struggling with recent events, visits his mother Diana (Jane Lynch) as she experiences a moment of lucidity.
317	3	"Spectator Slowing"	Kevin Berlandi	Bruce Zimmerman	January 15, 2020	1418	4.58
When a mother and daughter are hospitalized from a mail bombing in Tennessee, the BAU searches for a serial bomber who appears to be selecting his victims based on a personal grudge.
318	4	"Saturday"	Edward Allen Bernero	Stephanie Birkitt & Breen Frazier	January 22, 2020	1419	4.49
As the team enjoys a Saturday off, Garcia becomes personally involved after a participant in her hacking competition confesses she has a stalker, while Reid meets a woman named Maxine (Rachael Leigh Cook).
319	5	"Ghost"	Diana Valentine	Bobby Chacon & Jim Clemente	January 29, 2020	1421	5.88
When several people are shot in a rash of shootings in Des Plaines, Illinois, the BAU realizes the crimes match those of a sniper they hunted down fifteen years ago, but their assessment of the killings changes drastically when two of their own are kidnapped.
320	6	"Date Night"	Marcus Stokes	Breen Frazier	February 5, 2020	1420	4.35
When a father and daughter are kidnapped in Washington, D.C., Reid is forced into another confrontation with hitwoman Cat Adams (Aubrey Plaza), which threatens his date plans with Maxine.
321	7	"Rusty"	Rachel Feldman	Erica Meredith & Erik Stiller	February 5, 2020	1422	3.74
When three men are brutally killed in Denver, the BAU links the crimes to a psychotic delusion involving false memories and the Schrödinger equation. Meanwhile, Prentiss is forced to evaluate her future with Special Agent Andrew Mendoza (Stephen Bishop), who she is in a long-distance relationship with.
322	8	"Family Tree"	Alec Smight	Bruce Zimmerman	February 12, 2020	1423	3.94
When the bodies of businessmen and prostitutes turn up in Beaumont, Texas, the BAU finds themselves facing a killer with conflicting realities. Meanwhile, Prentiss and J.J. both grapple with decisions they must make on unexpected job offers.
323	9	"Face Off"	Sharat Raju	Christopher Barbour	February 19, 2020	1424	5.46
With one year passing since Rossi's near-death experience, the BAU travels to Reno, Nevada, to follow a lead on Everett Lynch, "The Chameleon", and figure out his new motivations. However, they are forced to contend with Lynch's mother (Sharon Lawrence), who has an agenda of her own that leads to a shocking outcome.
324	10	"And in the End..."	Glenn Kershaw	Erica Messer & Kirsten Vangsness	February 19, 2020	1425	5.36
With Reid in the hospital from a brain injury caused by the BAU's standoff with Lynch, the rest of the team continues their hunt for Lynch, which leads to a violent and climactic final confrontation. Meanwhile, Rossi contemplates retirement, while Garcia makes a life-changing decision that will alter the course of the BAU's future forever.

== Ratings ==
Viewership and ratings per episode of Criminal Minds season 15
No.	Title	Air date	Rating/share (18–49)	Viewers (millions)	DVR (18–49)	DVR viewers (millions)	Total (18–49)	Total viewers (millions)
1	"Under the Skin"	January 8, 2020	0.7/4	4.83	0.7	3.40	1.4	8.23
2	"Awakenings"	January 8, 2020	0.7/4	4.49	0.7	3.38	1.4	7.87
3	"Spectator Slowing"	January 15, 2020	0.7/4	4.59	0.7	3.24	1.4	7.83
4	"Saturday"	January 22, 2020	0.7/3	4.49	0.7	3.32	1.4	7.82
5	"Ghost"	January 29, 2020	0.9/5	5.88	0.7	2.92	1.6	8.80
6	"Date Night"	February 5, 2020	0.6/3	4.35	0.7	3.06	1.3	7.41
7	"Rusty"	February 5, 2020	0.5/3	3.74	0.8	3.57	1.3	7.31
8	"Family Tree"	February 12, 2020	0.6/3	3.94	0.8	3.40	1.4	7.34
9	"Face Off"	February 19, 2020	0.8/4	5.46	0.7	2.90	1.4	8.36
10	"And in the End..."	February 19, 2020	0.8/4	5.36	0.7	3.20	1.5	8.56
