= Emily Prentiss =

Character in American television series Criminal Minds

- Criminal Minds character
- First appearance: "The Last Word"; 2x09, November 15, 2006 (on Criminal Minds)
- Portrayed by: Paget Brewster

In-universe information
- Full name: Emily Elizabeth Prentiss
- Gender: Female
- Title(s): FBI BAU Supervisory Special Agent; FBI BAU Unit Chief; FBI Section Chief
- Occupation: FBI Section Chief
- Family: Elizabeth Prentiss (mother)
- Nationality: American /born in italy
- Born: October 12, 1970
- Seasons: 2, 3, 4, 5, 6, 7, 9, 11, 12, 13, 14, 15, 16, 17, 18, 19

Emily Elizabeth Prentiss is a fictional character in the CBS crime drama Criminal Minds, portrayed by Paget Brewster. A longtime member of the Behavioral Analysis Unit (BAU), Prentiss is characterized by her intelligence, linguistic abilities, leadership, resilience, and diplomatic upbringing as the daughter of an ambassador. Prentiss plays a central role in the series, eventually becoming Unit Chief in Season 12 and later Section Chief, a position she still holds in the series revival, Criminal Minds: Evolution.

Prentiss first appears in Season 2 as a replacement for Agent Elle Greenaway. Initially met with suspicion due to her diplomatic and political background, she proves herself through cultural knowledge, profiling skills, and perseverance. Her storyline is one of the most complex in the series, including her undercover involvement with an international terrorist in season 6. Prentiss leaves the BAU and leads Interpol in London. She makes brief appearances in Season 9 and Season 11 before rejoining the BAU as Unit Chief in Season 12 after Hotch's resignation. Since the end of Season 15, she has served as the FBI Section Chief.

Prentiss's role in the series was affected by Brewster's departure two separate times due to "creative, financial, and personal reasons." Her first exit occurred near the end of Season 6 after being let go following 18 episodes for "budget cuts", but she returned in Season 7 due to overwhelming fan demand. Brewster left again due to other television roles and was absent in Seasons 8 and 10, making brief guest appearances in Seasons 9 and 11. She reprised her role as a main character in Season 12 after actor Thomas Gibson, who portrayed Agent Aaron Hotchner, was fired.

== Character ==
=== Backstory ===
Emily Elizabeth Prentiss was born on October 12, 1970, into a high-profile diplomatic family. Her mother, Ambassador Elizabeth Prentiss, was a prominent U.S. diplomat whose career required frequent relocations to politically sensitive regions, including the Middle East and Europe. As a result, Emily spent much of her childhood living abroad, becoming fluent in multiple languages, including Arabic, Spanish, French, and Italian. Despite her privileged upbringing, Emily experienced emotional isolation, as her mother's demanding career came alongside a lack of family interaction. The strained relationship with her mother became a recurring theme throughout her life.

During her teenage years in Rome, Emily faced significant challenges, including a rebellious phase characterized by a goth persona and a desire to fit in with her peers. At fifteen, she became pregnant and sought advice from her priest, who warned her against abortion. With the help of her friend Matthew Benton, Emily ultimately had an abortion, which left her traumatized and distressed. Prentiss would later reconcile with her faith, gaining empathy and wisdom from her past experiences.

Before joining the BAU, Emily worked for Interpol, where she operated as an undercover agent infiltrating international criminal organizations. Her most significant mission involved Ian Doyle, a dangerous arms dealer and terrorist. Posing as Lauren Reynolds, Prentiss gained Doyle's trust and helped dismantle his network, orchestrating the faked death of his son to protect the child from Doyle's life of violence. After Doyle's arrest and imprisonment, Emily believed the mission was complete, but Doyle later escaped, seeking revenge. This chain of events forced Emily to fake her own death in Season 6, leaving the BAU and her life behind to protect her team. Only two of her colleagues were aware of the plan, and her reappearance in the premiere of Season 7 brought shock, frustration, and confusion to the rest of the team.

=== Personality ===
Emily Prentiss is portrayed as a highly intelligent, composed, and adaptable agent, whose cultural knowledge and diplomatic upbringing instill professionalism and the ability to remain calm under pressure. Her multilingual skills, analytical expertise, empathy, and desire for justice make her an invaluable profiler. Though generally level-headed, Prentiss is not immune to emotional responses, particularly in cases that mirror her own past or involve significant injustice. Her sharp wit and dry humor help her bond with her team and diffuse tense situations. She is regarded as an influential, disciplined, and caring leader who regularly puts her life on the line to protect her colleagues and friends.

== Storyline ==
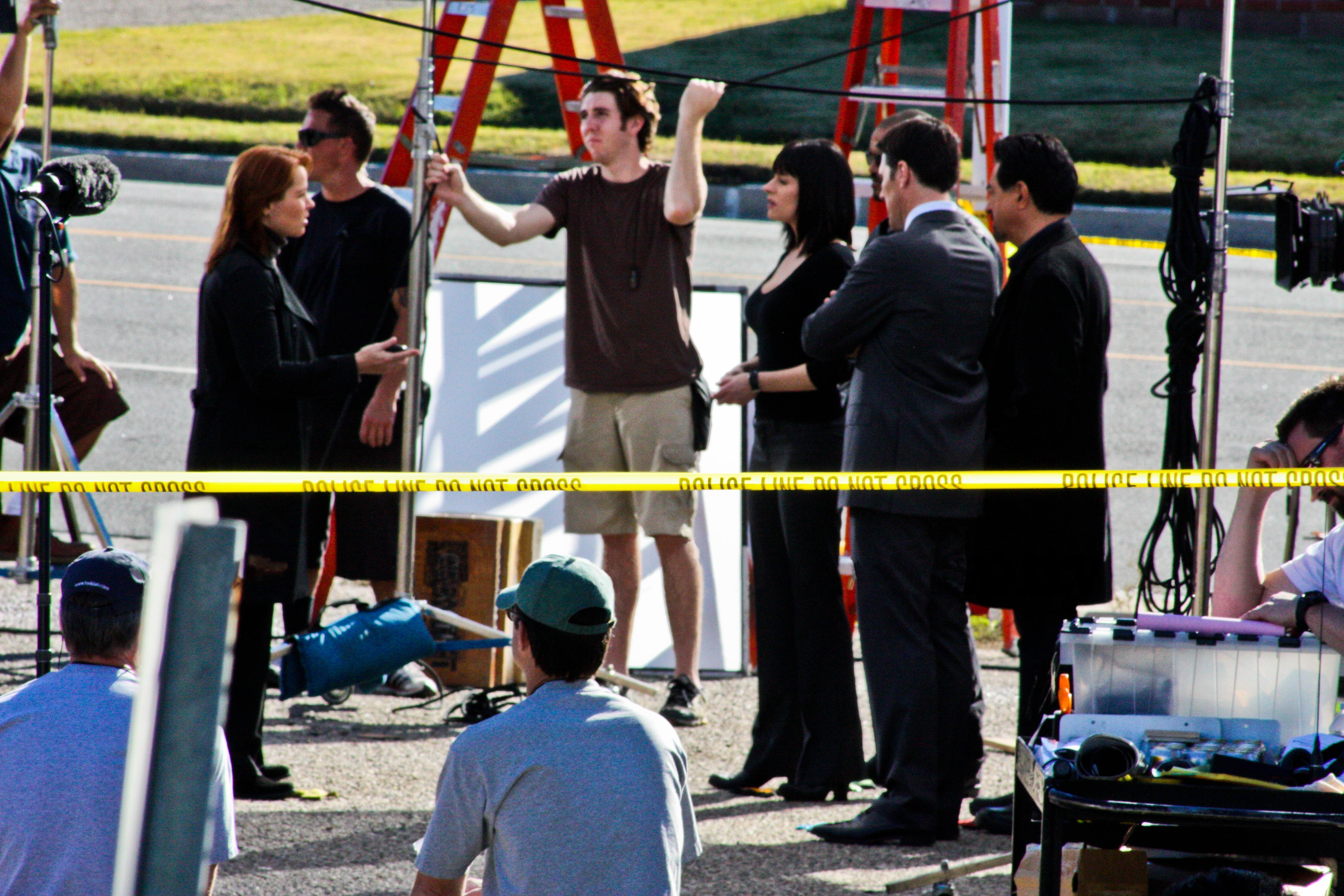
Paget Brewster can be seen here on-set, filming for Criminal Minds Season 6.

=== Early Seasons (Seasons 2 to 7) ===
Emily Prentiss is introduced in Season 2 as a replacement for Agent Elle Greenaway, joining the BAU unexpectedly. Initially met with suspicion due to her diplomatic background and unapproved transfer, Prentiss establishes herself as a valuable member of the team, demonstrating her multilingual abilities, cultural expertise, and strong profiling skills. Over these seasons, elements of her backstory are revealed, including her experience growing up as the daughter of a U.S. ambassador, her difficult childhood, and her time working with Interpol.

Prentiss's past plays a central role in Season 6 when Ian Doyle, a former arms dealer she helped capture during her Interpol tenure, escapes prison and seeks revenge. Posing as "Lauren Reynolds" during her undercover mission, Prentiss had staged Doyle's son's death to protect the child from his father's influence, sparking Doyle's vendetta against her. In "Lauren," Doyle captures and tortures Prentiss, leaving her gravely injured. To protect the BAU, Prentiss fakes her death with the help of Hotch and JJ and goes into hiding. She returns in Season 7, rejoining the team to neutralize Doyle and ensure the safety of his son, Declan. After resolving the conflict, Prentiss decides to leave the BAU at the end of the season, accepting a leadership position at Interpol's London office.

=== Guest Appearances (Seasons 9 and 11) ===
While Prentiss does not appear in Seasons 8 or 10, she makes several guest appearances during Seasons 9 and 11. In Season 9's "200," the series' 200th episode, she assists the BAU in rescuing JJ from a terrorist group, briefly reuniting with her former colleagues. In Season 11's "Tribute," she enlists the team's help in apprehending an international serial killer who has moved from Europe to the United States. During this period, Prentiss is depicted as thriving in her role at Interpol while maintaining her ties to the BAU.

=== Later Seasons (Seasons 12 to 17) ===
Prentiss returns to the BAU in Season 12 following Hotch's departure, stepping into the role of Unit Chief. Her tenure as leader involves managing internal challenges, including conflicts with FBI Assistant Director Linda Barnes, and leading the team through high-profile cases, such as the manhunt for serial killer Peter Lewis. In "Wheels Up," Prentiss is abducted and tortured by Lewis but refuses to compromise her team, highlighting her commitment to the BAU's mission. She later oversees the resolution of Scratch's threat.

Prentiss' leadership is explored further in the later seasons, along with her efforts to balance her professional and personal life. Her romantic relationship with Agent Andrew Mendoza is a recurring subplot. She was nominated to become the FBI Director in Season 15, ultimately deciding to remain with the BAU, reaffirming her commitment to the team. By the end of Season 15, she is promoted to Section Chief, overseeing the BAU and continuing her work within the FBI. Emily Prentiss has continued to appear in the series revival, Criminal Minds: Evolution. She maintains her position as a Section Chief in Seasons 16 and 17, experiencing a major traumatic event at the end of Season 17 during the discovery of the last two suspects relating to "Gold Star".

== Reception ==
paget brewster
(@pagetpaget)
tweeted:

Oh, hi Guys !! This is my first @criminalminds hair and make up from this morning…. I hope you're all excited for a slightly older, sassier, no filters, grey-haired Prentiss. And if you aren't, that's cool, just tell someone else.

August 8, 2022

Emily Prentiss has received significant attention from fans and critics alike, particularly regarding her character's departures and returns, which were closely tied to real-world factors. Paget Brewster was let go near the end of Season 6 (not long after her co-star A. J. Cook was also removed) due to "budget cuts." A.J. Cook returned to the show during Brewster's final episode. Brewster's original departure was met with significant backlash from fans, who expressed frustration over the decision to let her go. This response prompted the show to bring her back in Season 7 to resolve and continue her storyline. Brewster's second departure at the end of Season 7, when she left to pursue other roles, further highlighted the character's popularity, as viewers lamented her absence in subsequent seasons.

The storyline of Prentiss' faked death, while generally well-received, did result in criticism and backlash from some critics. Stephanie Kaloi of The List wrote that the series went too far with the storyline, questioning how the audience was "supposed to believe that Prentiss fooled an entire team of top-level investigators in the first place."

Brewster's decision to embrace her naturally gray hair both in and out of the series in Criminal Minds: Evolution has resulted in widespread acclaim for both Brewster and the character she plays. In earlier seasons of Criminal Minds, she had covered her gray hair with a wig whenever filming an episode. Her decision to embrace her gray hair both in and out of the series sparked cultural conversations about aging and beauty standards in Hollywood, being covered by many mainstream networks.
