= Revival (television) =

TV series that returns for new episodes after being off the air

In television, a revival is a television series that returns to produce new episodes after being off the air for a certain amount of time, particularly due to cancellation.

== Definition ==
Network executives may decide to attempt to revive a television program when they feel that a market once again exists for it. It is one of several programming strategies television networks employ to capitalize further on successful programs; among the other methods are spin-offs, reboots, remakes, cast reunions, television movies and sequels.

Unlike spin-offs, in which a television network creates an entirely new series around an existing character or setting, a revival reintroduces most or many of the original program's storylines, characters, and locales, and usually attempts to resolve story arcs that the original run failed to complete, as opposed to a sequel that may introduce a new storyline with some of the same characters after the previous series' story ended. Revivals usually take place at some point after the original series ends. By contrast, reboots and remakes may feature many of the original characters differently, but are usually played by new cast members and without taking into account events or continuity that occurred during the original series.

== See also ==
- Canon
- Continuation
- List of television spinoffs
- Moratorium
- Remake
- Reboot
- Sequel
- Spin-off

== Bibliography ==
- Brooks, Tim; Marsh, Earle (2003). The Complete Directory to Prime Time Network and Cable TV Shows 1946–Present (8th ed.). New York: Ballantine Books. ISBN 978-0-345-45542-0.
