= Kirsten Vangsness =

American actress and screenwriter (born 1972)

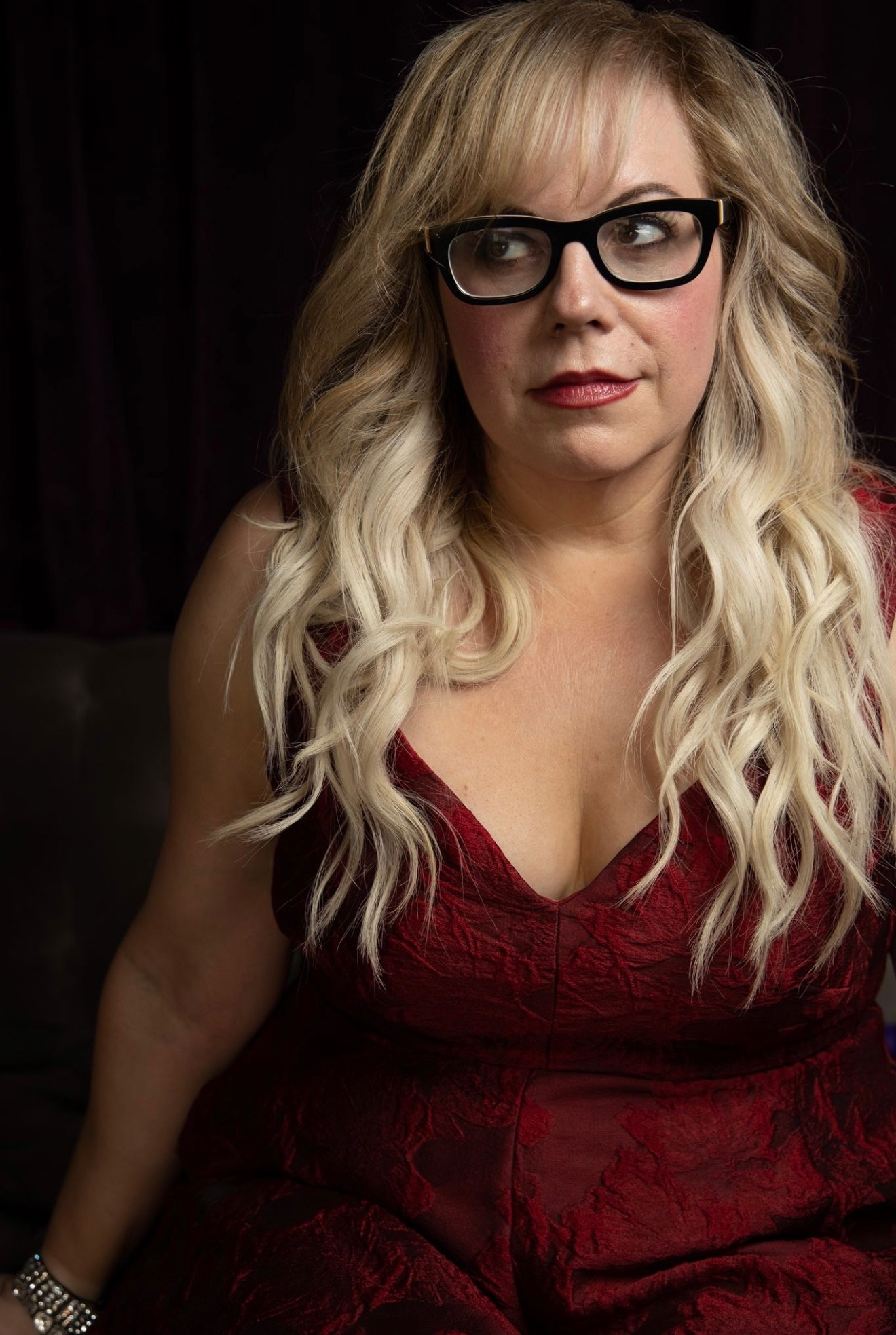
- Vangsness in 2019
- Born: July 7, 1972 (age 54); Pasadena, California, U.S.
- Education: California State University, Fullerton (BA)
- Occupations: Actress; writer
- Years active: 1998–present

Kirsten Vangsness (born July 7, 1972) is an American actress and writer. She is best known for her role as FBI technical analyst Penelope Garcia on CBS's Criminal Minds, as well as the spin-offs Suspect Behavior and Beyond Borders.

== Early life ==
Vangsness was born in Pasadena, California and raised in Porterville, a small town in Northern California where her parents both worked as teachers. She attended Cypress College in Cypress, California. She later graduated from California State University, Fullerton in 1996.

== Career ==
=== Acting ===
Vangsness became involved in acting as a child to help overcome shyness and got her first big break in the theatre, where she won several awards, including the 15 Minutes of Female Best Actress Award, the Los Angeles Drama Critics Award for Best Emerging Comic Actress, and the Golden Betty Award.

She made her television debut with a guest role on the Disney Channel series Phil of the Future in 2004. She also appeared in three episodes of the drama series LAX that year.

In 2005, Vangsness got her big television break on the CBS's crime drama series Criminal Minds where she portrays FBI technical analyst Penelope Garcia. She began the series as a recurring character before being promoted to the main cast in season 2. Criminal Minds became a ratings success for CBS, consistently ranking among the network's most-watched programs and winning the People's Choice Award for Best TV Crime Drama in 2017. The series ended in 2020 with its fifteenth season, however was revived with Criminal Minds: Evolution just two years later. In March 2026, the series was renewed for its twentieth season with Vangsness set to return.

In 2015, she starred in the American historical fiction neo-noir mysteryblack comedy film Kill Me, Deadly alongside Dean Lemont. The film was based on a 2009 play by Bill Robens. Her Criminal Minds co-stars Joe Mantegna and Shemar Moore also appear in the film.

In 2017, Vangness returned to the stage with her one-woman comedy show Mess based on the TED Talk “Making Sense of a Visible Quantum Object”

Vangsness starred in the 2023 Lifetime television film Amish Stud: The Eli Weaver Story. She portrayed Barb Raber, the real life woman that was convicted of aggravated murder of Barbara Weaver, her lover's wife. The following year, she began her recurring role in the Disney Channel sequel series Wizards Beyond Waverly Place as Minister Bigelow McFigglehorn, a wizard. The show is set to air its third and final season in 2026.

=== Writing ===
Vangsness' work has been published in the Los Angeles Times. Since 2014, Vangsness has co-written four episodes of Criminal Minds. In 2014, she co-wrote "Nelson's Sparrow" with executive producer, Erica Messer. In 2015, she co-wrote "A Beautiful Disaster" once again with Messer and in 2016 she co-wrote "Spencer" with Messer. The Criminal Minds series finale (before the revival) was also co-written by Vangsness and Messer.

== Personal life ==
In a 2011 interview, Vangsness described herself "as queer as a purple unicorn singing Madonna". She was in a seven-year relationship with editor Melanie Goldstein, to whom she was engaged, until 2013.

In 2015, she announced her engagement to Keith Hanson. Though at the time, she had been engaged to both a man and a woman, Vangsness says she does not identify as bisexual. "...If I were straight, I would say I was, but I don't totally understand it myself. I don't want to have an answer to something that I don't really have an answer to." Since then however, she has referred to herself as bisexual in social media posts. Since 2020, Vangsness has been involved in a romantic relationship with Los Angeles veterinarian and singer-songwriter Stephen Moffitt.

== Other ventures ==
Vangsness serves as a spokesperson, volunteer and advocate for Alex's Lemonade Stand Foundation, an organization that encourages children to fundraise and spread awareness of pediatric cancer by running their own lemonade stands.

In 2016, Vangsness and two business partners opened Blinking Owl Distillery, the first crafter distillery to open in Orange County.

== Filmography ==
=== Film ===
| Year | Title | Role | Notes |
|---|---|---|---|
| 1998 | Sometimes Santa's Gotta Get Whacked | Tooth Fairy | Short |
| 2006 | A-List | Blue | |
| 2008 | Tranny McGuyver | TV News Reporter | Short |
| 2009 | Scream of the Bikini | Interior Decorator | |
| 2010 | In My Sleep | Madge | |
| 2011 | Sarina's Song | Party Guest | Short |
| 2011 | The Chicago 8 | Sketch Artist | |
| 2012 | Remember to Breathe | Vocals for Young Alice | Short |
| 2015 | Kill Me, Deadly | Mona Livingston | |
| 2016 | Diane & Devine Meet the Apocalypse | Fawn | |
| 2017 | Axis | Heather (voice) | |
| 2017 | Dave Made a Maze | Jane | |

=== Television ===
| Year | Title | Role | Notes |
|---|---|---|---|
| 2004 | Phil of the Future | Veronica | Episode: "Age Before Beauty" |
| 2004 | LAX | Ticket Agent / Stephanie | 3 episodes |
| 2005–present | Criminal Minds | Penelope Garcia | Main role |
| 2010 | Vampire Mob | Laura Anderson | |
| 2010–2012 | Pretty the Series | Meredith Champagne | Recurring role |
| 2011 | Criminal Minds: Suspect Behavior | Penelope Garcia | Main role |
| 2011 | Second City This Week | Herself | 1 episode |
| 2011–2013 | Good Job, Thanks! | Therapist | 2 episodes |
| 2013 | Shelf Life | Freaky Squeaky | 6 episodes, webseries |
| 2016–2017 | Criminal Minds: Beyond Borders | Penelope Garcia | 2 episodes |
| 2023 | Amish Stud: The Eli Weaver Story | Barb Raber | Television film |
| 2024–2025 | Wizards Beyond Waverly Place | Bigelow McFigglehorn | Recurring role |
| 2026 | Scrubs | Pauline | Episode: "My Angel" |
