= Erica Messer =

American television writer, producer, and story editor

Erica Messer is an American television writer, producer, and story editor. Since 2011, she has been the showrunner of Criminal Minds after being one of the main writers since the premiere in 2005. She has written episodes for television such as Alias, The O.C., Charmed, and Criminal Minds. She has also co-produced two shows: Charmed and Criminal Minds, as well as acting as a story editor on Alias and executive story editor on The O.C.

== Career ==
Messer began her career with the television series Alias in 2001 as a screenwriter. In 2002, she was promoted to story editor on Alias. Messer, then in 2003–04, wrote several episodes for The O.C. and serving as executive story editor. She wrote one episode for Charmed in 2004. From 2004 to 2005, Messer was the co-producer of Charmed. From 2005 to the present, she has been with the television series Criminal Minds as a screenwriter, producer, supervising producer, and executive producer. In 2010, Messer was named co-showrunner. In 2011, she was named sole showrunner. In 2013, Messer re-signed her contract with Criminal Minds. In 2014, CBS was looking for a spin-off. In 2015, Messer wrote the backdoor pilot episode "Beyond Borders" in the tenth season of Criminal Minds for which the spin-off Criminal Minds: Beyond Borders was created. Messer has also co-written multiple episodes of Criminal Minds with star Kirsten Vangsness.

== Filmography ==
=== Television credits ===
Year	Work	Role	Notes	Ref.
2001	Alias	Co-screenwriter with Debra J. Fisher	"Mea Culpa" (S 1:Ep 9)	
2002	Alias	Co-screenwriter with Debra J. Fisher	"Rendezvous" (S 1:Ep 21)	
2002	Alias	Co-screenwriter with Debra J. Fisher	"Passage (Part 1)" (S 2:Ep 8)	
2003	The O.C.	Co-screenwriter with Debra J. Fisher	"The Heights" (S 1:Ep 9)	
2003	The O.C.	Co-screenwriter with Debra J. Fisher	"The Links" (S 1:Ep 16)	
2004	Charmed	Co-screenwriter with Debra J. Fisher	"Once in a Blue Moon" (S 7:Ep 6)	
2005	Charmed	Co-screenwriter with Rob Wright & Debra J. Fisher	"Show Ghouls" (S 7:Ep 15)	
2005–2027	Criminal Minds	Staff writer (2005–08); Head screenwriter (2009–2010); Showrunner (2011–present)	Written and/or co-written 75 episodes and counting	
2006	The O.C.	Staff writer	"The Summer Bummer" (S 4:Ep 6)	
2016–17	Criminal Minds: Beyond Borders	Creator; Head writer	Written 3 episodes	

=== Production credits ===
Year	Work	Role	Notes	Ref.
2002–03	Alias	Story editor	22 episodes	
2003–04	The O.C.	Executive story editor	26 episodes	
2004–05	Charmed	Co-producer	20 episodes	
2005–2020	Criminal Minds	Co-producer (2005–06); Producer (2006–07); Supervising producer (2007–08; 2009–10); Co-Executive producer (2008–09); Executive producer (2010–2020)	246 episodes+	
2016–17	Criminal Minds: Beyond Borders	Executive producer (2016–17)		
