= Mall (Abbott Elementary) =

Episodes of the 5th season of Abbott Elementary

- Abbott Elementary episodes
- In a promotional photo for the episode, the faculty and staff of Abbott Elementary meet outside the mall that will serve as a temporary school location.
- Episode nos.: Season 5 Episodes 9–11
- Directed by: Randall Einhorn; Tyler James Williams; Jennifer Celotta
- Written by: Riley Dufurrena; Chad Morton; Rebekka Pesqueira
- Cinematography by: Mike Pepin
- Editing by: Jeff Haul; Richie Edelson
- Production codes: T12.19509; T12.19510; T12.19511
- Original air dates: January 7, 2026; January 14, 2026; January 21, 2026

Guest appearances
- Luke Tennie as Dominic; Matthew Law as O'Shon; Benjamin Norris as Simon; Zack Fox as Tariq; Jerry Minor as Mr. Morton; Raven Goodwin as Krystal; Taylor Garron as Tasha Hoffman; Khandi Alexander as Miss Carrol; Marcella Arguello as Ms. Alomar

Episode chronology
← Previous "Birthday"	Next → "Picture Day"
- Abbott Elementary season 5

The three-part mid-season premiere for the fifth season of Abbott Elementary was broadcast in 2026 on the American Broadcasting Company (ABC). It began with the ninth episode of the season, "Mall", on January 7, continued with episode ten, "Mall Part 2: Questions & Concerns", on January 14, and concluded after the eleventh episode, "Mall Part 3: Heroes", on January 21.

Abbott Elementary is a mockumentary and workplace comedy created by Quinta Brunson that centers around the struggles of teaching at an underprivileged elementary school in Philadelphia, Pennsylvania. The sitcom primarily focuses on five teachers – Janine Teagues (Brunson), Gregory Eddie (Tyler James Williams), Melissa Schemmenti (Lisa Ann Walter), Jacob Hill (Chris Perfetti), and Barbara Howard (Sheryl Lee Ralph) – their principal Ava Coleman (Janelle James), and the custodian, Mr. Johnson (William Stanford Davis).

In the episodes, Abbott Elementary is forced to relocate to a dead mall following significant damage to their regular school building. Spanning the eightieth through eighty-second episodes overall, the story arc was conceived by series creator Quinta Brunson after she learned about Pali High in Los Angeles, California, temporarily moving to an abandoned Sears building following the Palisades Fire a year earlier.

All three episodes were filmed on-location at Westfield Promenade Mall in Woodland Hills, Los Angeles, with filming lasting slightly over a month. Pre-production took place in the two months prior, during which time production designers dressed the mall as one existing in Philadelphia rather than California. The three parts were directed and written by Randall Einhorn and Riley Dufurrena, Williams and Chad Morton, and Jennifer Celotta and Rebekka Pesqueira, respectively.

== Plot ==
=== Part 1 ===
After their usual school building is declared uninhabitable due to a burst water pipe and destroyed furnace, the faculty and staff of Abbott Elementary return from winter break early. They meet at a vacant shopping mall that they plan to transform into temporary learning facilities. A group of teachers, Janine, Gregory, Melissa, Jacob, and Barbara, begin moving desks and other supplies into empty stores which will serve as classrooms. The school principal is indecisive on where she wants her office to be and O'Shon, the district's information technology liaison, sets up internet access in the mall. Janine attempts to make her room similar to those at Abbott, believing that it will make the experience more enjoyable for her students, while Barbara takes a minimalistic approach. Jacob and Melissa briefly argue over a space they both wish to claim as their classroom.

Gregory mentors Dominic, a first-year teacher, to help him adapt to the unusual situation. Chaos erupts on the students' first day in the mall when Ava provides poor entrance instructions to the parents. The teachers struggle with classroom control and face issues during bathroom breaks due to the building design. During lunch, the students are dissatisfied with their meals. Barbara provides bleak but honest advice to the other teachers and Ava on how they can best serve their students. After settling on an office space, Ava discovers clothing stock that was left behind by the stores. As the day goes on, the teachers and students become more comfortable with the situation; together, they create a temporary Abbott sign to hang in the atrium. Ava's secretary Dia chooses to take time off when she is displeased with the environment.

=== Part 2: "Questions & Concerns" ===
Janine struggles to teach effectively after the accidental reactivation of a large head, resembling the appearance of Benjamin Franklin, that plays "Yankee Doodle" and promotes store sales every hour. She and Gregory encounter a plethora of questions from concerned parents about the logistics of student education in the mall and when they will return to their school building. Ava unsuccessfully seeks the answers and solutions to their worries from the school board. Mr. Morton devises a plan to trick Melissa into spending time with his friend group, rather than those she usually socializes with. The Parent-Teacher Association (PTA) requests a meeting with Ava; believing it will not help, she declines, leading Janine and Gregory to take it on themselves. The school's custodian, Mr. Johnson performs double duty as Ava's secretary while Dia is on vacation. Jacob suspects Mr. Morton of attempting to separate Melissa from himself and shares his anxieties with Barbara, who dismisses them.

The PTA is unsatisfied with the responses that Janine and Gregory provide and are unhappy with Ava's avoidance. Mr. Morton invites Melissa to attend a trivia game with himself and other teachers at a bar. Barbara overhears this and enlists Jacob to help her spy on them. Ava uses artificial intelligence to create a chatbot which she uses to address the parents; upon this discovery, the parents become further enraged. She then decides to see the parents personally, but is still unable to resolve the tension. After Mr. Morton belittles Barbara, Gregory, Jacob, and Janine, Melissa becomes angered and reprimands him. The remainder of the teachers, along with Ava, join the others for drinks. On the next day, Ava provides the teachers with new whiteboards using funds she made from selling clothes that were left behind. Mr. Johnson locates what he believes to be a deactivation switch for the Benjamin Franklin head; after pulling it, the head crashes to the floor and shatters with a distorted voice.

=== Part 3: "Heroes" ===
Jacob has trouble teaching gym class when the teachers are forced to take turns covering it because they don't have a physical education instructor. Mr. Johnson determines that the mall is too large to clean himself and Ava agrees to hire a second custodian to assist him. Ava tells the teachers that the district has news that they believe will be about returning to Abbott. There is hostility between Miss Carol, the new janitor, and Mr. Johnson upon her arrival. Simon arrives from the district and informs the school that The Philadelphia Inquirer will be doing a front-page feature story about Abbott and that Scholastic will be donating supplies and a mobile library. The teachers are ecstatic when the newspaper prints, but Gregory is skeptical of the message it sends. Mr. Johnson and Miss Carol bicker about the best way to clean the mall. Ms. Alomar joins Gregory in his skepticism, believing that the story is merely a distraction. She then tells the others that she was told the construction crew was pulled from Abbott to work on another school.

After Miss Carol and Mr. Johnson realize they use the same blend of cleaning chemicals and she gives him tips on how to remove a stain, the two begin flirting with each other. The teachers visit Abbott to find its repairs far from complete and a lone construction worker who confirms Ms. Alomar's story. They decide to go see Simon and figure out why the repairs at Abbott have stopped working. Mr. Johnson and Miss Carol continue to grow closer to one another. When they confront Simon, he tells the teachers that the destruction at Abbott revealed similar problems at other schools, and that the crews were assigned to repair those issues first to prevent another disaster. They convince Simon to reassign the priority to Abbott. Upon sharing this information with the students and other faculty, Mr. Johnson and Miss Carrol agree to break up because she will not be able to transfer to Abbott. The teachers elatedly return to the building; Dia also comes back from her vacation to Crystal River and brings Ava a manatee desk ornament souvenir. Although she acts indifferent and unemotional, Ava admits she is glad Dia has returned.

== Production ==
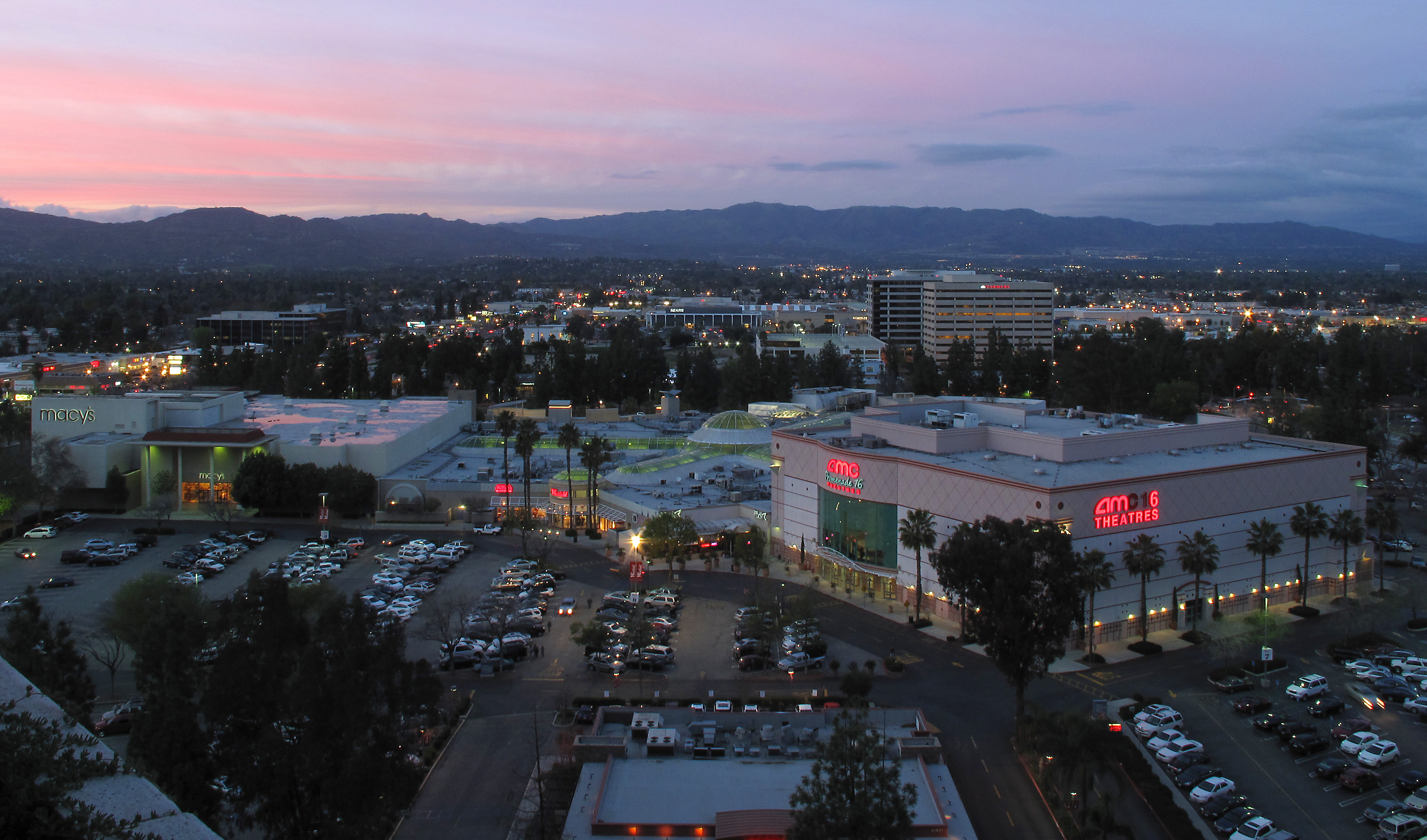
The episodes were filmed at Westfield Promenade Mall (pictured in 2011 prior to its closure and subsequent demolition) in Woodland Hills, Los Angeles.

The idea for the three-episode story arc was conceived by series creator Quinta Brunson, who was influenced by Palisades Charter High School temporarily moving to an abandoned Sears building following the Palisades Fire in 2025. She and her co-showrunners, Justin Halpern and Patrick Schumaker, wanted to tell the story after learning how frequently similar situations happen elsewhere. Prior to writing the episode, teachers and school administrators who had first-hand experiences with comparable circumstances were consulted. This included someone from the Los Angeles Unified School District where Palisades Charter High School is zoned, which allowed the writers to learn how it affected students, instructors, and school boards.

Abbott Elementary's production designer, Michael Whetstone, initially considered building a mall on the Warner Bros. Studios lot, but determined it to be too cost-prohibitive. Instead, David B. Lyons, the location manager, began seeking out a dead mall in the Los Angeles, California, area that could be used. Although he initially faced issues due to the lack of available options in the local real estate market, Lyons ultimately secured a contract to use the recently-abandoned Westfield Promenade Mall in Woodland Hills. Filming of the episodes were the last event to occur at the location before it was demolished for the construction of Rams Village at Warner Center, a headquarters and training center for the Los Angeles Rams, a National Football League (NFL) team.

Pre-production began with Whetstone's production design team two months before filming took place. The first month was spent planning, during which two-dimensional renderings of storefronts were first made in Adobe Photoshop, then placed on a three-dimensional miniature model of the mall. The second month was dedicated to preparing the filming location. One to two of those weeks were used cleansing the mall of shattered glass and removing indoor mold. After the floors were cleaned, they were intentionally soiled again to make the location appear aged. Whetstone recalled that fixtures and counters would sometimes "disappear" between location scouting trips.

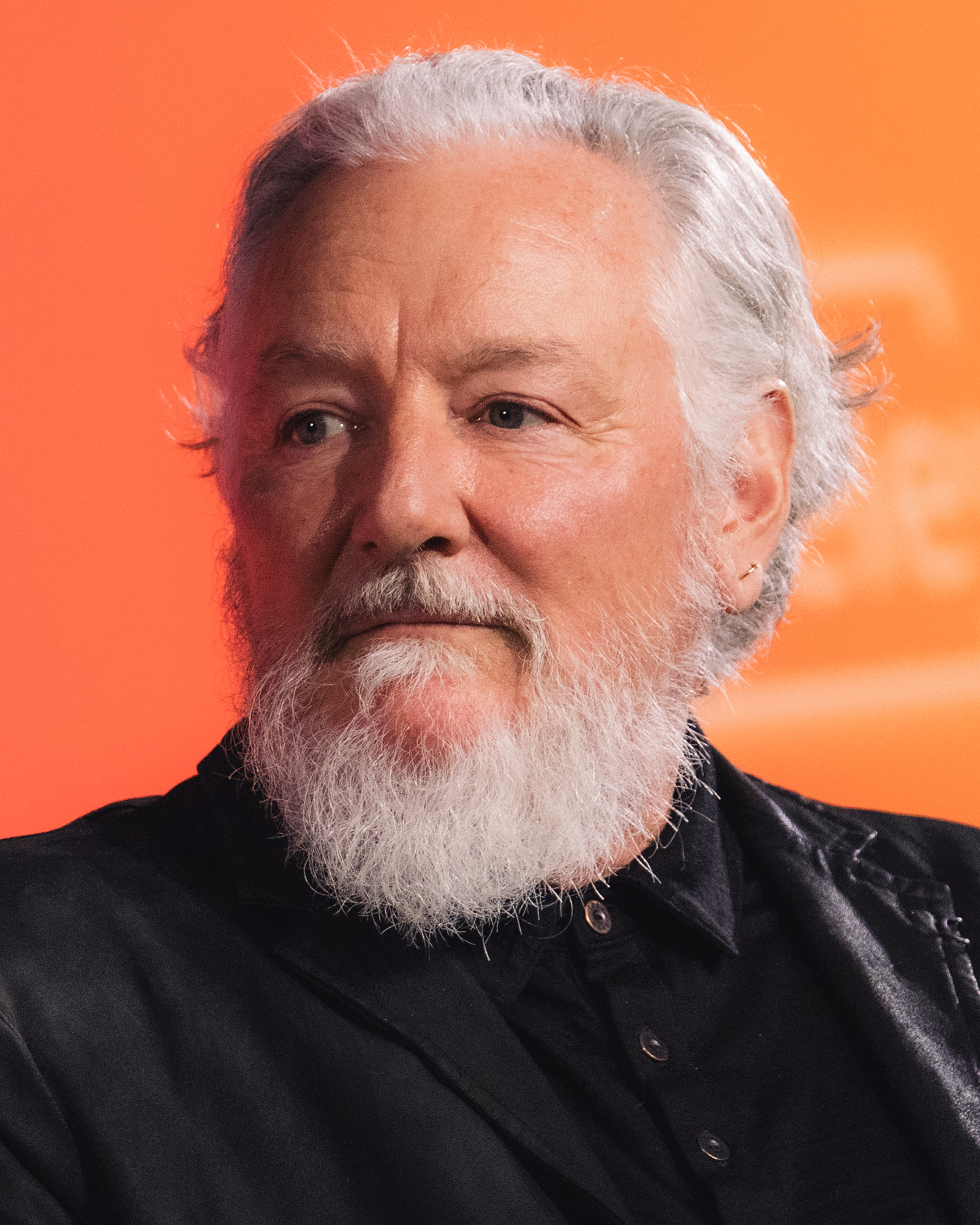
Randall Einhorn (pictured) directed the first of three episodes in the story arc.

The goal of the production team was to make the mall appear as one that closed ten years earlier in Philadelphia, Pennsylvania, where the series is set, rather than a recent closure of one in California. Some signs the team created were deliberately damaged to aid with this. The team were also only permitted to feature businesses that had gone bankrupt and had no internet stores. A mix of regional and national chains were shown, with the show particularly making use of Bailey Banks & Biddle, KB Toys, and Sears. The location of classrooms were moved from Whetstone's initial plan at the request of Randall Einhorn, the director of "Mall". This allowed Gregory and Janine's classes to be located nearer each other for scripting reasons compared to the original idea of placing them on separate floors. The teachers' lounge was constructed in a former Ruby's Diner restaurant.

Filming for the episodes at the mall spanned slightly over a month. Line producer Scott Sites managed the unusually-high budget for the episodes due to increased transportation costs. A filming hiatus was rescheduled to lower spending costs of renting the mall. The three episodes were directed by Randall Einhorn, Tyler James Williams, and Jennifer Celotta, and written by Riley Dufurrena, Chad Morton, Rebekka Pesqueira, respectively. Guest stars in the arc included Luke Tennie as Dominic, Matthew Law as O'Shon, Benjamin Norris as Simon, Zack Fox as Tariq, Jerry Minor as Mr. Morton, Raven Goodwin as Krystal, Taylor Garron as Tasha Hoffman, Khandi Alexander as Miss Carrol, and Marcella Arguello as Ms. Alomar. Pam Trotter also co-starred as Dia.

== Release and reception ==
"Mall" was first broadcast on ABC on January 7, 2026. It is the mid-season premiere of Abbott Elementary's fifth season. "Mall Part 2: Questions & Concerns" aired one week later on January 14. The final episode, "Mall Part 3: Heroes", transmitted on January 21. All three episodes were broadcast at 8:30 p.m. Eastern Time, and each episode also released on Hulu the day after its respective airing. The first part was seen by 2.74 million people and had a share of 0.34/5 among adults aged 18–49. Part two received a slight increase to 2.81 million viewers with a 0.43/6 18–49 share. A further rise was seen during part three, which was watched by 2.83 million Americans, holding an 18–49 share of 0.17/3.

Reviewing "Mall" for Tell-Tale TV, Melody McCune wrote that the change of setting was an enjoyable format change for the series and that it contained some of Abbott Elementary's best comedy. She was more critical of "Questions & Concerns", opining that it was weaker than the prior episode, but still added to the arc. Following "Heroes", McCune was appreciative that the arc had concluded before becoming exhausted and praised the insight into Mr. Johnson's personal life. She also particularly praised the performances of guest stars Luke Tennie, Jerry Minor, and Khandi Alexander.
