= Warner Center, Los Angeles =

Master-planned development in Los Angeles, California

Coordinates: 34.179°N 118.601°W

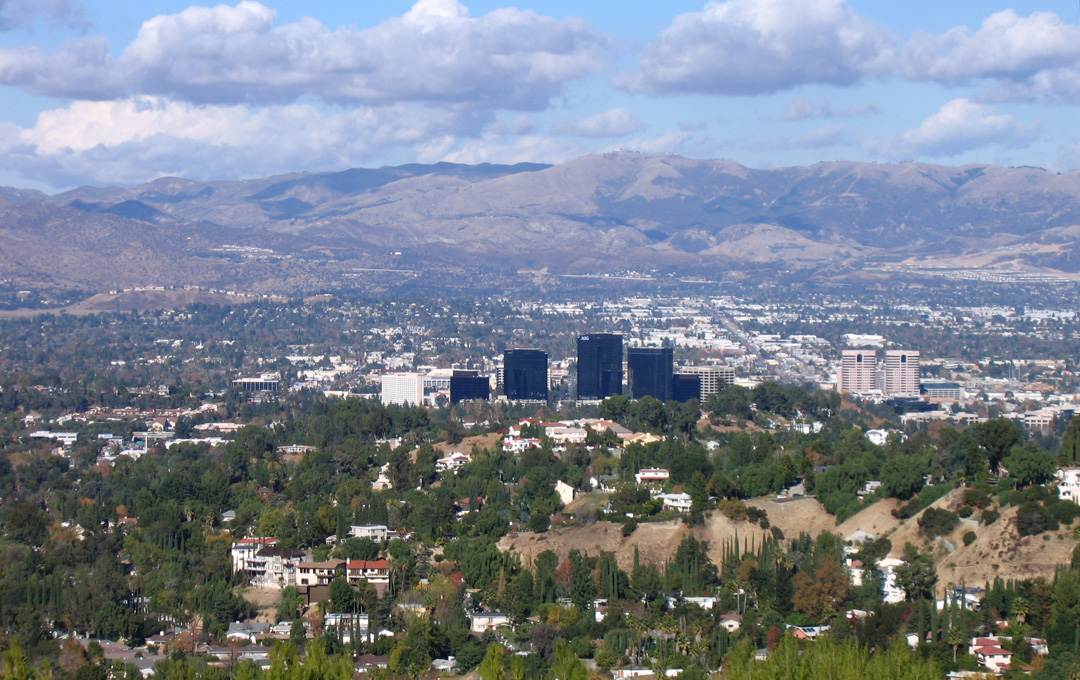
Woodland Hills, Los Angeles in the foreground, including Warner Center.

Warner Center is a master-planned business district in the Woodland Hills and Canoga Park neighborhoods of the San Fernando Valley portion of the city of Los Angeles, California.

Warner Center is generally bounded by Vanowen Street to the north, De Soto Avenue to the east, the Ventura Freeway to the south, and Topanga Canyon Boulevard to the west. The Warner Center 2035 Plan, which was adopted in December 2013, added the area between Vanowen and the LA River to the plan area, which comprises approximately 1,100 acres or 1.7 square miles.

Located in the western San Fernando Valley portion of Los Angeles, Warner Center was planned to help relieve traffic to and from Downtown Los Angeles by becoming a generator of jobs in the San Fernando Valley. It was first envisioned in the late 1960s.

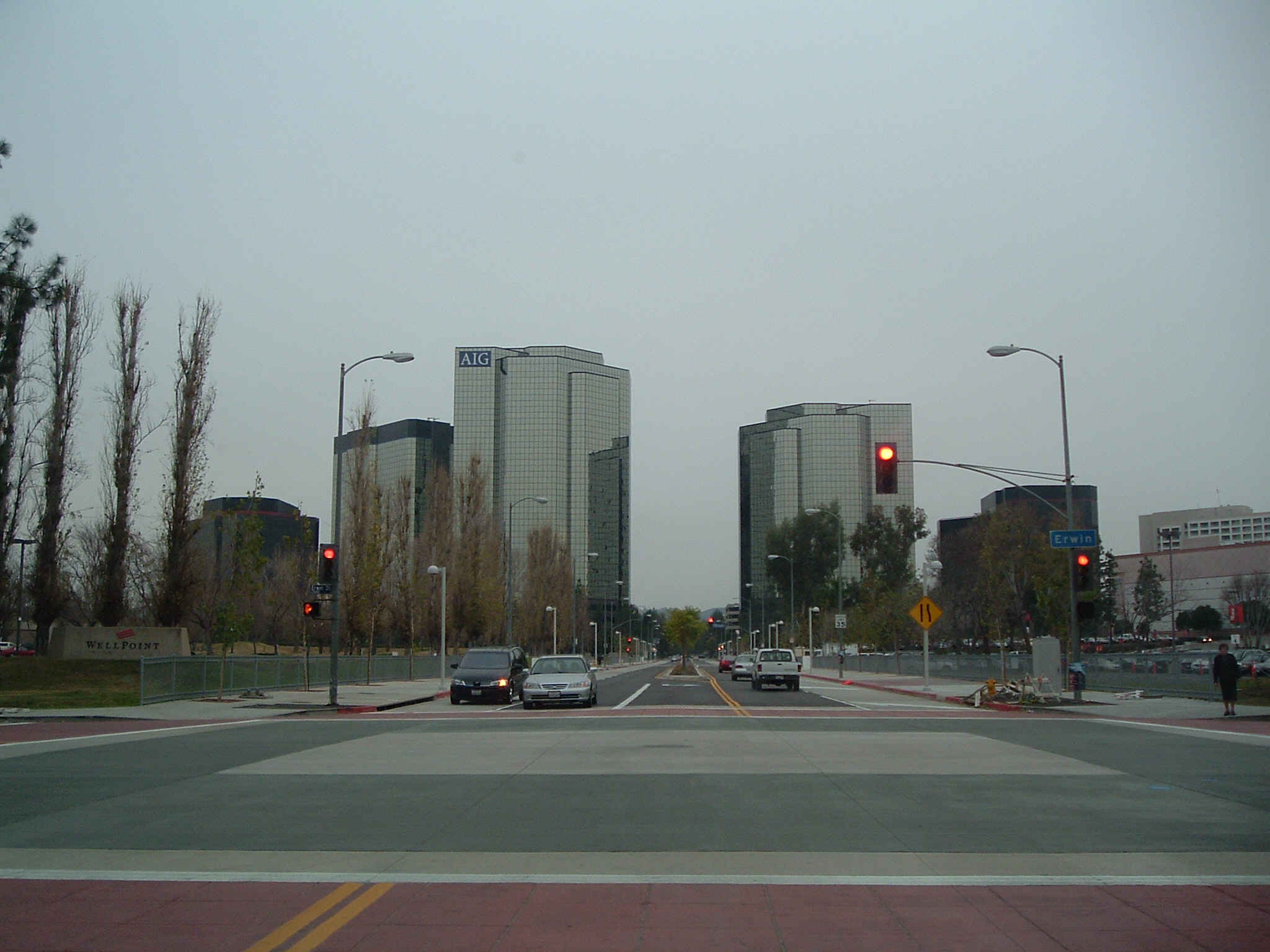
The three tallest buildings of Warner Center, with mid-rise buildings around them. Taken from the corner of Owensmouth and Erwin in December 2004.

== History ==
Warner Center is named for Harry Warner, the eldest of the Warner Brothers, who bought the land in the 1940s, which he used as a horse ranch. His family donated 20 acres (8.1 ha) of land in 1967 that became the Warner Center Park (also known as the Warner Ranch Park), situated east of Topanga Canyon Boulevard between Califa Street and Marylee Street.

In 1968, Robert Allison, then the manager for the San Fernando Valley office of Coldwell Banker, arranged the sale of 630 acres (250 ha) of the land to Aetna Life and Casualty for $30 million. Aetna acquired the land for long-term investment and development purposes, and later brought in Kaiser as a joint venture partner. Allison spearheaded the early land planning, subdivision and development efforts on behalf of Kaiser Aetna.

Initially, large tracts of the Warner Ranch land were developed in the Canoga Park portion, between Victory Boulevard and Vanowen Avenue. Topanga Plaza was first, followed by engineering facilities and headquarter offices for the aerospace companies Rocketdyne and Litton Industries.

With the sale of the land to Aetna, the pace of development in Warner Center accelerated. Kaiser Aetna acted as a master developer, offering land for sale or lease, buildings for sale or lease, and leased buildings built to owner's specifications. Development sites from very small parcels up to 100 or more acres were offered.

In the ensuing 20 years, much of the build-out of Warner Center occurred, including approximately 4,300 multi-family dwelling units, and millions of square feet of commercial and office space. Notable developments include:

- The 34 acres (14 ha) Promenade Mall which opened in 1973.
- Kaiser Permanente Hospital, which opened in 1986.
- The 1.1 million square foot Warner Center Business Park built in the mid to late 1970s, consisting of low and mid-rise office and industrial buildings.
- The 1.8 million square foot Warner Center Plaza built out from the early 1980s to the early 1990s, with its signature high-rise office buildings that feature reflective glass exteriors and give Warner Center its distinct skyline. The complex includes Warner Center Plaza I (constructed in 1980, completed in 1982, and opened in 1983), Warner Center Plaza VI (constructed in 1986, completed in 1988, and opened in 1989), and Warner Center Plaza III (constructed in 1988, completed in 1990, and opened in 1991).
- The Trillium Office Project, featuring twin 17-story towers with a combined area of 600,000 square feet, opened in 1986.

Real estate developer Robert Voit, in partnerships with Robert Allison and New England Life Insurance Company, developed the Warner Center Business Park and Warner Center Plaza. The partnerships were wound down in the early 1990s and since that time the ownership of the properties has become fragmented.

During the 1990s following the completion of the Warner Center Plaza project, relatively little new development occurred. The economic slowdown of the early 1990s, combined with the damage from the 1994 Northridge earthquake, served to put the brakes on new development for the rest of the decade.

The next major project was LNR Warner Center, which was built at the site of the former Prudential Life Insurance Company buildings between 2001 and 2005, totaling over 1.4 million square feet of primarily office space.

Also, in the early 2000s, a flurry of new multifamily housing projects were built. This burst of residential building created concerns in the community about issues such as traffic. In reaction to these concerns, City Councilmember Dennis Zine initiated a restudy of the Warner Center Specific Plan in 2005.

The Warner Center 2035 Plan (WC 2035 Plan) is a development blueprint for Warner Center that emphasizes mixed-use and transit-oriented development, walkability, and sustainability.

A Citizen's Advisory Committee was established in 2005, consisting of members of the local neighborhood councils including the Woodland Hills-Warner Center Neighborhood Council and the Canoga Park Neighborhood Council as well as business and property owners, which worked with city planning staff and its consultants to develop the plan. In December 2013 the plan was adopted by the Los Angeles City Council.

By 2035, the plan anticipates an additional:

- 14 million square feet of nonresidential building area
- 20,000 residential dwelling units
- 49,000 jobs

In 2011, the Los Angeles Daily News quoted City Planner Ken Bernstein as describing a new vision for Warner Center as more "cosmopolitan, 21st century." The paper added: "The plan would allow 40-story skyscrapers. Small retail shops — where locals could walk to buy basics — would be encouraged, in an area now dominated by national chains and big malls. The long superblocks and six-lane thoroughfares would be 'cut up' by adding paseos and crosswalks to create a more intimate feel for pedestrians."

In 2012 the City Council approved the Village at Westfield Topanga - which included a new Costco, as well as a massive retail, dining, and entertainment development that would combine with two existing Westfield Warner Center malls (Westfield Topanga Mall and Westfield Promenade Mall).

The 34-acre vacant shopping mall (14 ha), The Promenade, was sold in March 2022 to sports owner and real estate developer Stan Kroenke for approximately $150 million. A month later, Kroenke bought an adjacent vacant 13-story office building on 31 acres (13 ha) of parking lots and landscaping for $175 million, formerly occupied by health insurer Anthem Inc. The combined property is being developed into a lifestyle and entertainment district called the Rams Village at Warner Center which includes the permanent team headquarters and practice facility for the Los Angeles Rams. The Village shopping center was also purchased by Kroenke in January 2023 for $325-million bringing his total property ownership to 100 acres (40 ha).

== Transit ==
In October 2005, the Orange Line busway was established creating an east–west link across the San Fernando Valley. The route will now link Warner Center with the neighborhood of North Hollywood and the Metro Red Line. In June 2012, the busway route was expanded to include a north–south portion connecting Warner Center with the neighborhood of Chatsworth and the Metrolink system. The G Line (name changed in 2020) no longer serves Warner Center and is replaced with Metro Route 601 which runs between the Canoga station and Warner Center.

== Emergency services ==
=== Fire service ===
Los Angeles Fire Department Station 84 (Woodland Hills) and Station 72 (Canoga Park) serve Warner Center.

=== Police service ===
Security officers employed by Allied Universal Security Services continuously monitor and patrol all buildings, parking structures, and loading docks. Los Angeles Police Department operates the nearby Topanga Community Police Station.

== Hospital ==
Kaiser Permanente Woodland Hills Medical Center is a general medical and surgical hospital in Warner Center. Kaiser Permanente Medical Center consists of a 175-bed hospital and serves 2 million residents of the San Fernando Valley. Kaiser Permanente Woodland Hills Hospital, a non-profit general medical and surgical facility, is operated by Kaiser Foundation Hospital.

The hospital had 12,600 admissions in the latest year for which data are available. It performed 4,055 annual inpatient and 5,197 outpatient surgeries. Its emergency room had 38,131 visits. Kaiser Permanente Woodland Hills Hospital is the highest ranked hospital in the San Fernando Valley, and ranked 13th highest hospital among Los Angeles-area hospitals because of its strength in specialties such as cancer, diabetes, endocrinology, gynecology, orthopedics and urology."
