= Amber Alert (film) =

2024 thriller film

- Promotional release poster
- Directed by: Kerry Bellessa
- Written by: Kerry Bellessa; Joshua Oram
- Produced by: Kerry Bellessa; Summer Bellessa; Tony Stopperan
- Starring: Hayden Panettiere; Tyler James Williams; Kevin Dunn
- Cinematography: Luka Bazeli
- Edited by: Joshua Oram
- Production companies: Hungry Bull Productions; Bluefields Entertainment; Three Point Capital (TPC)
- Distributed by: Hulu; Lionsgate Films
- Release date: September 27, 2024
- Running time: 90 minutes
- Country: United States
- Language: English

Amber Alert is a 2024 American thriller film, written and directed by Kerry Bellessa and Joshua Oram. The film stars Hayden Panettiere and Tyler James Williams as two ordinary people who find themselves caught up in a very dangerous situation as a result of an AMBER alert that has been issued for the abduction of a child. The film also features Saidah Arrika Ekulona and Kevin Dunn.

The film is a remake of Bellessa's 2012 found-footage film of the same name. Unlike the original, the remake abandons the found-footage format in favor of a more traditional film production approach, and expands upon the story by including elements of police work, emergency dispatch services, and general chase scenes.

Amber Alert was released in select theaters and video on demand on September 27, 2024, by Lionsgate.

== Plot ==
In Louisville, Kentucky, seven-year-old Charlotte Bryce is abducted from a park while playing hide-and-seek with her younger brother. Her mother, Monica, captures partial footage of the kidnapping, showing Charlotte being approached by a black Toyota Camry. After contacting 911, Sergeant Phil Casey issues an AMBER Alert despite lacking a license plate number.

Meanwhile, Jacqueline "Jaq" Dana, having missed her taxi ride, convinces off-duty rideshare driver Shane to give her a lift. While en route, they receive the AMBER Alert on their phones and soon spot a vehicle matching the description. At Jaq's urging, Shane agrees to follow the car. At a gas station, Jaq sees a child in the back seat, increasing their suspicion that the car may be involved in the abduction.

The pursuit continues to an isolated field, where they feign car trouble to confront the driver, who identifies himself as Aaron. He claims the child in the car, ‘Olympia’, requires medication for a heart condition, and that the vehicle is mistakenly being pursued. Believing the authorities may have been misled, Jaq and Shane initially let him go. However, Jaq realizes that the child is actually Charlotte and that Aaron has falsified the license plate to avoid detection, prompting them to resume the chase.

Jaq and Shane eventually track Aaron to a secluded property. Despite police warnings to stay back, they investigate the house when Aaron leaves briefly and discover Charlotte held captive in a cage, along with evidence suggesting he previously abducted numerous other children. They manage to free Charlotte, but Aaron returns home, resulting in a confrontation. During the ensuing struggle, Aaron and Shane exchange gunfire, wounding each other. Aaron pursues Jaq and Charlotte, shooting Jaq twice while she shields Charlotte. Sergeant Casey intervenes, fatally shooting Aaron. A bandaged Shane accompanies the more wounded Jaq to an ambulance, while Charlotte is reunited with her mother.

== Cast ==
- Hayden Panettiere as Jaq
- Tyler James Williams as Shane
- Ducky Cash as Charlotte
- Saidah Arrika Ekulona as Cici
- Kurt Oberhaus as Aaron
- Katie McClellan as Monica
- Kevin Dunn as Sgt. Phil Casey

== Production ==
=== Crew ===
- Kerry Bellessa – director, and screenwriter
- Joshua Oram – writer
- Kerry Bellessa – producer
- Summer Bellessa – producer
- Leal Naim – executive producer
- Joseph Restaino – executive producer
- Tony Stopperan – executive producer
- Jessica Kelly – casting
- Stacey Rice – casting
- Sally Jean Wegert – Production Design
- Molly Morgan – Costume Design

=== Development and filming ===
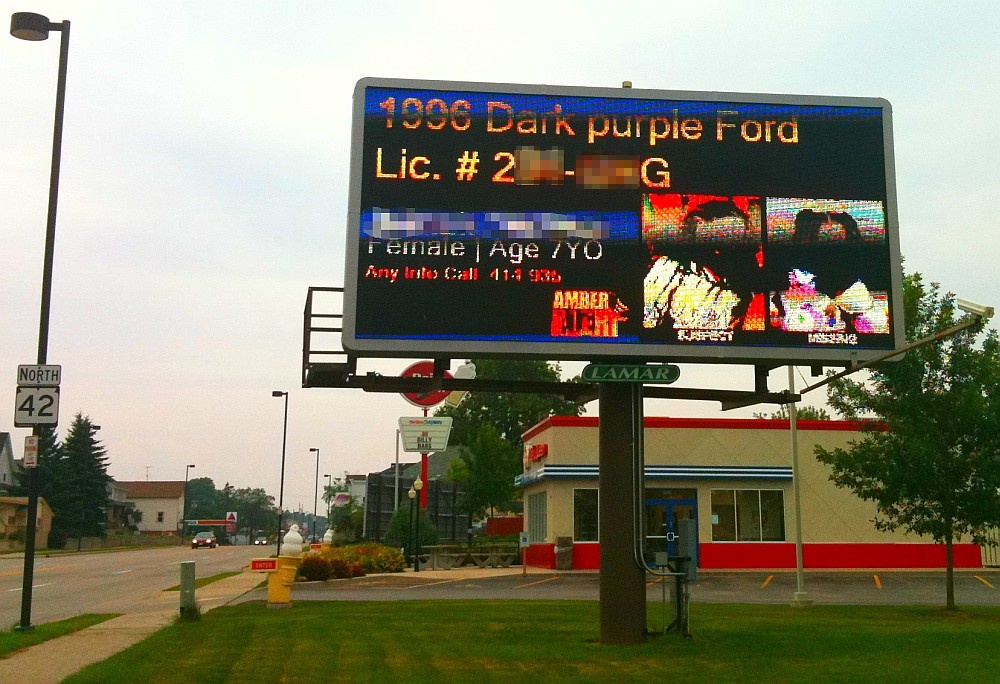
An example of an Amber alert .

Kerry Bellessa, who directed and co-wrote Amber Alert with Joshua Oram, revisited a story he first filmed in 2012 as a low-budget found-footage project; the original version was produced on a budget of approximately US$5,000, while the 2024 remake represents their fully realized vision with a professional cast, crew, and production values. and is a deliberate reworking of that earlier film into a thriller.

"It was January of 2010, and we saw a real-life active Amber Alert. I remember seeing it and saying, 'Summer, we are going to find this car,' and gripped the wheel a little tighter and said, 'We are going to run that car off the road; we are going to save the kid and be heroes."

"I was like, 'Uh, let's take a moment, that does not seem like the smartest thing to do, in case there is a kid involved. Maybe we should call the police and watch from afar.' We kept talking about it for about an hour and a half, about what we would do in different circumstances," Summer Bellessa said.

"I went home and scoured the internet, thinking this is such a great idea, great concept, pretty simple, and no one has done it. I called my buddy Josh, who wrote it with me, and we started working on it."

— Kerry Bellessa, on inspiration behind script of Amber Alert

Bellessa said the idea for the film originated from a real-life experience in 2010, when he and his wife received an AMBER Alert while driving from Los Angeles to Phoenix and discussed how they might respond if they encountered the vehicle described in the alert.

When Bellessa and Oram returned to the material, they intentionally moved away from the restricted viewpoint of the found-footage format. The script was expanded to include scenes showing 911 dispatch, police response, and broader chase sequences, enabling a larger scope of action and more conventional cinematic staging.

Bellessa noted that, although the narrative is fictional and not a dramatization of a single true case, the production sought to explore the ethical and emotional questions ordinary citizens face when confronted with an AMBER Alert, a theme the filmmakers reinforced in the film's final moments with information about the AMBER Alert system. The film was produced under the banners of Hungry Bull Productions, Bluefields Entertainment, and Three Point Capital (TPC), and distributed by Lionsgate Films.

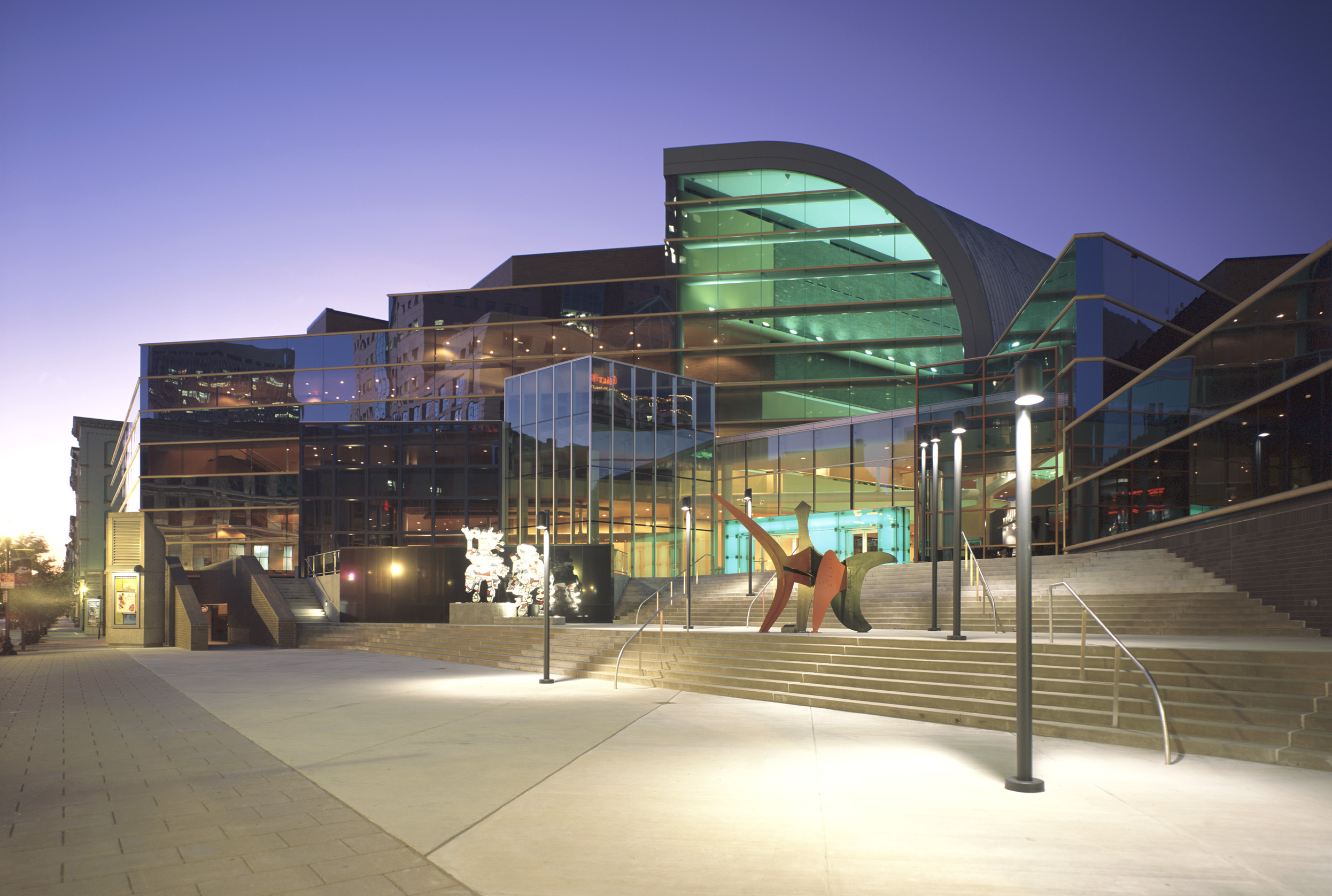
The Kentucky Center in Downtown Louisville

Amber Alert made use of Louisville, Kentucky, as its primary filming location. Several recognizable city landmarks, including the downtown skyline, Spaghetti Junction, the David in front of the 21c Museum Hotel, David Armstrong Extreme Park, KFC Yum! Center, and mentions of Middletown and Hurstbourne, appear in the film's trailer, establishing the city as the backdrop for key sequences. To heighten realism during the film's tense chase and pursuit scenes, the filmmakers combined practical driving with rigged filming vehicles. Director Bellessa expressed interest in collaborating with cinematographer Emmanuel Lubezki on the project, although budget limitations prevented the partnership from materializing at the time. The film was ultimately shot by Cinematographer Luka Bazeli, who used drone shots to emphasize the smallness of the vehicle and the difficulty of the search during the film's pursuit scenes.

The use of drone‑ or stabilized‑camera aerial shots contributed to a grounded visual style rather than a highly stylized or CGI‑heavy aesthetic.

Because much of the film unfolds inside moving vehicles, cast and crew collaborated closely on lighting, blocking, and camera placement to maintain continuity and authenticity. Scenes involving emergency dispatch, police involvement, and public‑alert procedures were also shot on location, lending the narrative procedural realism and embedding the story in a community environment, reinforcing the film's anchor in everyday citizens' potential involvement.

== Music ==
The original score for Amber Alert was composed by Don Miggs, known for his work on films such as 23 Blast and Skyman. Lionsgate Records released the Amber Alert soundtrack album on October 4, 2024, featuring 31 tracks of Miggs's score, which underscore the film's tension and narrative progression. The album was made available digitally through major music services and includes cues such as "Opening," "Abduction," "Where's Charlotte," and "The Reckoning," among others.

== Release ==
Amber Alert premiered as a limited theatrical release in the United States on September 27, 2024, alongside a simultaneous on-demand launch by Lionsgate Films. It later became available for streaming on Hulu.

== Reception ==
On Rotten Tomatoes, it holds a 63% approval rating based on reviews from 16 critics.

Grant Hermanns from Screen Rant noted the film's predictability but praised the lead performances, mentioning, "While the movie may never fully overcome its feeling of familiarity, Panettiere and Williams' performances truly ground us throughout the tense ride." Sheila O'Malley of RogerEbert.com wrote that while the film benefits from stronger production values and a more conventional structure than the 2012 original, it lacks a sustained sense of genuine peril. She criticized the film's reliance on familiar thriller beats but praised the performances of Hayden Panettiere and Tyler James Williams for grounding the story emotionally. JimmyO of JoBlo.com acknowledged the film's earnest performances and moral urgency but criticized the screenplay for its implausible character decisions and reliance on standard genre tropes, which he felt undermined its suspense. Paul Metcalf of Bloody Disgusting described the film as a less demanding but more accessible remake of the 2012 original, praising its straightforward execution while noting its predictability. Heaven of Horror described the film as an effective but modest thriller that works best when viewed as entertainment rather than a realistic procedural drama.

Horror Cult Films noted that while the film contains logical inconsistencies, it remains engaging due to its pacing and performances. Josh Spiegel of Josh at the Movies described the film as tense and effective in moments, particularly due to its lead performances, but noted that questionable narrative logic and predictable developments ultimately limit its impact. Writing for Next Best Picture, Dan Bayer characterized Amber Alert as a competently made but unremarkable thriller, praising Panettiere's performance while criticizing the film's pacing and underdeveloped character arcs. Writing for Punch Drunk Critics, Travis Hopson cited the film's urgency and performances as strengths but criticized its uneven third act and neatly resolved climax. Geek Vibes Nation praised the performances and premise but stated that the film's familiar structure and predictable plotting limited its overall memorability.

Audience reactions varied, with some appreciating the suspense and others finding the plot implausible, particularly the lack of police involvement during the chase.
