= Let It Shine (soundtrack) =

Soundtrack album by Let It Shine cast
- Released: June 12, 2012
- Recorded: 2011–2012
- Genre: R&B; pop rap; pop; gospel
- Length: 35:32
- Label: Walt Disney Records

Singles from Let It Shine
- 1. "Don't Run Away" Released: April 20, 2012; 2. "What I Said" Released: May 22, 2012

The soundtrack of the film Let It Shine features 13 original songs and was released on June 12, 2012. The tracks were written by top songwriters and producers in the pop and R&B business.

The soundtrack debuted at number 29 on the US Billboard 200. It has also charted at number 22 on the US Digital Albums chart 3 on the US Rap Albums chart, number 2 on the US Top Soundtracks chart and topped the US Kid Albums chart. On June 29, 2012, the soundtrack topped the US Top Rap Albums.

== Singles ==
- "Don't Run Away" was the first single released from the soundtrack, performed by Tyler James Williams featuring IM5. The song was released on April 20, 2012. It was written by Armato, James, In-Q, Thomas Sturges and Jon Vella, produced by Tim James and Antonina Armato.
- "What I Said" was the second single released from the soundtrack, performed by Coco Jones. The song was released on May 22, 2012. It was written by Lambert "Stereo" Waldrip, Justin Mobley, Anya Vasilenko, Tocarra Phillips and Steven Jones, produced by Lambert "Stereo" Waldrip

== Critical reception ==
Professional ratings
Review scores
Source	Rating
AllMusic	3/5 stars

Matt Collar of AllMusic gave a review: "The soundtrack to the 2012 Disney musical, Let It Shine features a mix of pop R&B, dance-oriented hip-hop, and contemporary gospel numbers. The film is conceived as a modern hip-hop version of the Cyrano de Bergerac story, and the soundtrack includes cuts by stars Tyler James Williams as Cyrus DeBarge and Coco Jones as Roxanne "Roxie" Andrews, along with others. On the pop end, these are bright, slickly produced tracks that bring to mind a mix of the dance-club sound of Mike Posner, Lupe Fiasco, and Usher. Elsewhere, there are a few passionate, gospel-tinged ballads, including Jones' "Good to Be Home" and the uplifting title track."

== Commercial performance ==
The soundtrack debuted at number 29 then peak at number 12 on the US Billboard 200. It has also charted at number 22 on the US Digital Albums chart 3 on the US Rap Albums chart, number 2 on the US Top Soundtracks chart and topped the US Kid Albums chart. It topped the US Rap Albums on June 29, 2012.

== Track listing ==
No.	Title	Writer(s)	Producer(s)	Length
1.	"Don't Run Away" (Tyler James Williams featuring IM5)	Antonina Armato, Tim James, In-Q, Thomas Sturges, Jon Vella	Tim James, Antonina Armato	2:56
2.	"Guardian Angel" (Tyler James Williams and Coco Jones)	Antonina Armato, Tim James, In-Q, Thomas Sturges, Jon Vella	Tim James, Antonina Armato	3:42
3.	"Me and You" (Tyler James Williams and Coco Jones)	Gad, Robbins, Adam Hicks	Toby Gad	3:36
4.	"What I Said" (Coco Jones)	Lambert "Stereo" Waldrip, Justin Mobley, Anya Vasilenko, Tocarra Phillips, Steven Jones	Lambert "Stereo" Waldrip	3:01
5.	"Who I'm Gonna Be" (Coco Jones)	Adam Watts, Andy Dodd	Adam Watts, Andy Dodd	2:52
6.	"You Belong to Me" (Tyler James Williams)	Antonina Armato, Tim James, In-Q, Thomas Sturges, Jon Vella	Tim James, Antonina Armato	2:36
7.	"Tonight's the Night" (Brandon Mychal Smith, Spencer Lee and Tyler James Williams)	Toby Gad, Lindy Robbins, David Banner, J-Doe	Toby Gad	3:13
8.	"Around the Block" (Let It Shine cast)	Armato, James, In-Q, Thomas Sturges, Jon Vella	Tim James, Antonina Armato	1:25
9.	"Moment of Truth" (Tyler James Williams and Brandon Mychal Smith)	Armato, James, In-Q, Thomas Sturges, Jon Vella	Tim James, Antonina Armato	3:15
10.	"Joyful Noise" (Let It Shine cast)	Dapo Torimiro, Jay L'Oreal	Dapo Torimiro	2:16
11.	"Good to Be Home" (Coco Jones)	Adam Watts, Andy Dodd	Adam Watts, Andy Dodd	3:25
12.	"Let It Shine" (Tyler James Williams and Coco Jones)	(Harry Dixon Loes) Armato, James, In-Q, Thomas Sturges, Jon Vella	Tim James, Antonina Armato	2:53
13.	"Self Defeat" (Tyler James Williams) (bonus track)	Antonina Armato, Tim James, In-Q, Thomas Armato Sturges, Jon Vella	Tim James, Antonina Armato	2:22
Total length:				35:41

== Charts ==
=== Weekly charts ===
Chart (2012)	Peak position
Spanish Albums (PROMUSICAE)	71
US Billboard 200	12
US Kid Albums (Billboard)	1
US Top Rap Albums (Billboard)	1
US Soundtrack Albums (Billboard)	2

=== Year-end charts ===
Chart (2012)	Position
US Soundtrack Albums (Billboard)	17
