= Trevor Jackson (performer) =

American actor and singer (born 1996)

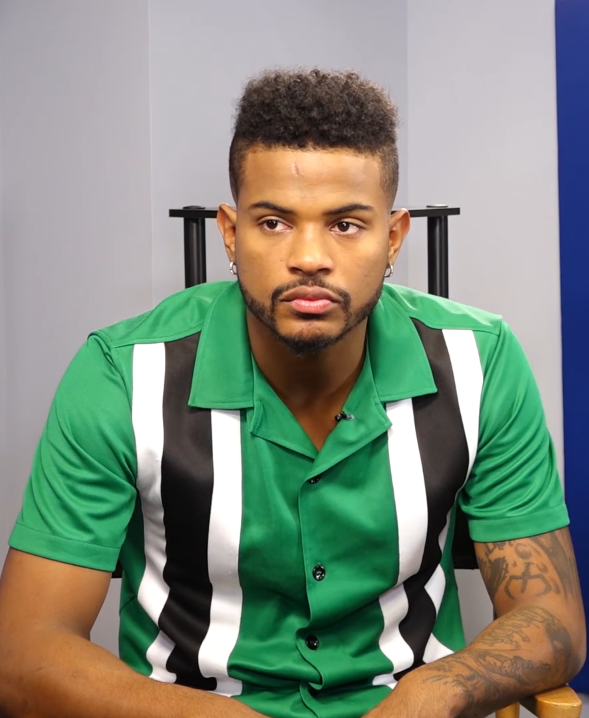
- Jackson in 2018

Background information
- Born: Trevor Howard Lawrence Jackson; August 30, 1996 (age 30); Indianapolis, Indiana, U.S.
- Genres: R&B; hip hop; pop; dance
- Occupations: Actor; rapper; singer; songwriter; dancer
- Years active: 2006–present
- Labels: Born Art; EMPIRE
- Website: officialtrevorjackson.com

Trevor Howard Lawrence Jackson (born August 30, 1996) is an American actor and singer. He is best known for portraying Aaron Jackson on Freeform series Grown-ish, Kevin Blake on Syfy series Eureka, Kris McDuffy on Disney Channel's television film Let It Shine, Kevin LaCroix on American Crime and Dr. Wes Bryant on the ABC medical drama Grey's Anatomy.

Other notable appearances include Broadway musical The Lion King, where he played the Young Simba, and television guest star roles on both Cold Case and Harry's Law. In 2012, he won the Young Artist Award for Best Performance in a TV Series. In 2018, he starred in the crime drama Superfly.

== Early life ==
Jackson was born in Indianapolis, Indiana, the younger of two sons of Cam Baxter and Kelvin Jackson. Although he comes from a family interested in basketball, at age eight he decided that he would rather work in the entertainment industry. He honed his talents at local venues, performing both within his hometown and nationally, including a dance routine on Showtime at the Apollo. In 2004, the eight-year-old Jackson won the role of Young Simba on the national tour of The Lion King musical, with which he remained.

== Career ==
=== 2010–11: Career beginnings and Eureka ===
Following his run with The Lion King, he transitioned from Broadway to the small screen appearing as a guest star in an episode of Cold Case in 2010. From 2010 to 2012 he played Kevin Blake in the final two seasons of Eureka. In early 2011, Jackson joined a "behind the scene" group with several up and coming music artists at the time known as "Before 2012." This didn't last long as success tore the group apart before it ever went mainstream. In August 2011, he continued his run on TV starring in an episode of Harry's Law for which he won the Young Artist Award for Best Performance in a TV Series for his role of Willie Blue. Jackson later appeared as a guest star on the Disney Channel television show Austin & Ally.

=== 2012–13: Let It Shine, musical beginnings, #NewThang EP ===
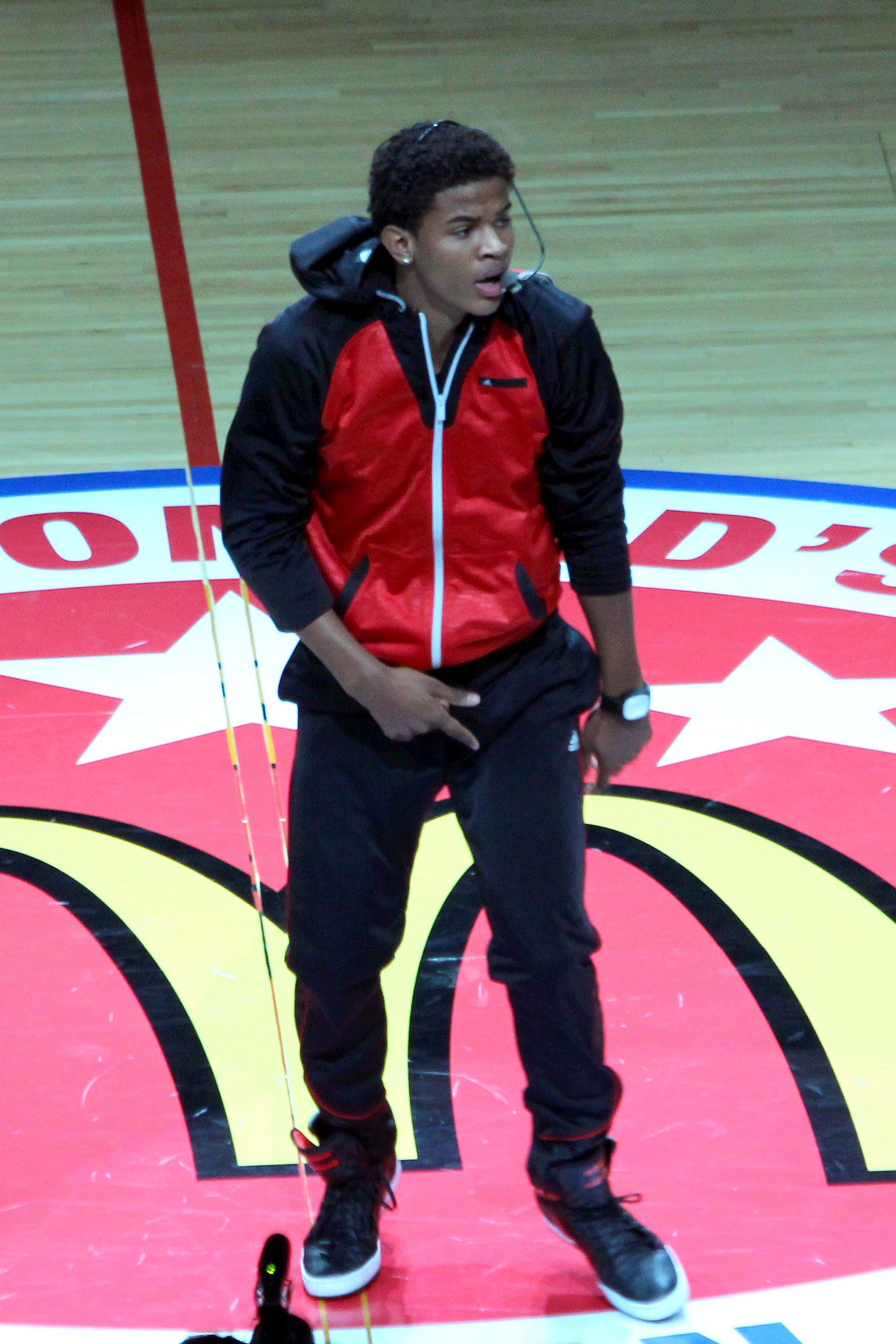
Jackson at the 2013 McDonald's All-American Boys Game halftime show.

In 2012, Jackson expanded his acting career into film, playing the role of Quincy Smith in the film A Beautiful Soul. That same year, Jackson went on to star in the original Disney Channel television movie Let It Shine as Kris McDuffy alongside Tyler James Williams. Jackson portrayed the best friend and confidant of Cyrus (James), an aspiring hip hop musician who enters a songwriting contest and mistakenly wins his best friend's dream. Jackson has completed shooting the film Sons 2 The Grave alongside Darrin Dewitt Henson, Demetria McKinney and Justin Martin.

In 2012, Jackson signed with Atlantic Records continuing on to release his first single "Like We Grown" in February 2013. In the song's music video, Disney Channel actress, Zendaya Coleman, plays his love interest. Due to demand for new music from his fans, Jackson collaborated with producers Eric Hudson, J.R. Rotem and The Underdogs, to create his EP, #NewThang.

In September 2013, Jackson released the #NewThang EP. Jackson followed with his second single "Drop It", which was featured in McDonald's Monopoly Campaign commercial. To promote the #NewThang EP, Jackson toured with fellow Atlantic Records artist Justine Skye in the High School Nation Tour. He also played in a few shows.

=== 2014–present: In My Feelings ===
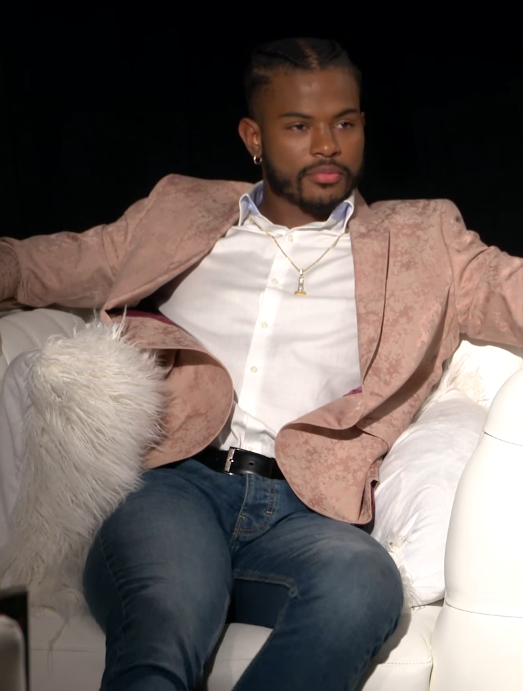
Jackson in 2018

In January 2014, Jackson released "New Thang" followed by a remix to his single "Drop It" featuring rapper B.o.B. In May, Jackson was featured on Diggy Simmons' single "My Girl". in the summer of 2015 Jackson released his debut full-length album. Jackson released the album's first single, "Good Girl, Bad Girl", on June 3, 2014. On July 22, 2014, Jackson posted a lyric video to a track with Kirko Bangz on his official YouTube channel titled "Me Likey" four days before its iTunes release. On August 3, 2014, Jackson partnered with fellow Atlantic Records artist Diggy Simmons on the Who Else But Us Tour. Jackson premiered the video for "I'll Be Who You Love (This Christmas)" on Rap-Up on December 3. Jackson followed with a new single, "Know Your Name", featuring Sage The Gemini on December 15. Jackson appeared as a guest on VINE and vocalist LianeV's new single "Keep Playin".

In early August, Jackson released the tracks on his YouTube channel and SoundCloud for stream with a visual for the song "Simple As This". On August 28, 2015, Jackson released the In My Feelings project on iTunes. In September he released the music video for his song "Bang Bang", which features Kevin Gates.

On December 3, 2015, Jackson released a video of "Like I Do" from In My Feelings on Billboard.

Jackson joined the regular cast of American Crime in its second season, playing the part of Kevin Lacroix. At the 2019 Soul Train Music Awards Jackson won the "Soul Train Certified Award".

From 2018 to 2024 he acted on the Freeform show "Grown-ish" as Aaron Jackson, a classmate and love interest of Zoey Johnson. Also in 2024, Jackson released an EP titled "Heads Up", followed by a full-length album titled "It’s Complicated". Both projects featured OnlyFans content creator and influencer Malaika Terry on the track "All The Way”, on which they addressed their real-life romantic relationship.

Since 2025 he plays Dr. Wes Bryant on Grey's Anatomy.

== Artistry ==
Jackson cites Michael Jackson, Gregory Hines, Donny Hathaway, Brian McKnight, and the Nicholas Brothers as his biggest musical influences.

Jackson aimed for his debut album to serve as a cohesive unit, saying it was his goal to "make an album that is not just a bunch of singles, but an album that can be listened to from top to bottom." Conversely, he also "wanted every song to say something, to be an experience."

== Philanthropy ==
Jackson supported Snoop Dogg's anti-violence "No Guns Allowed" campaign by releasing his own cover of Snoop Lion's single "No Guns Allowed", in March 2013. In April 2013, Jackson volunteered at the Ronald McDonald House Charities in Chicago. Jackson participated in the Strike Out Cystic Fibrosis's Bowling Charity Event on July 29, 2013. Jackson hosted the Duffy's Hope 11th Annual Teen Youth Empowerment Summit in Dover, Delaware on August 3, 2013. The organization helps provide youth with mentoring, health, education and more. Jackson has also worked with NBA Cares and The League of Young Voters Education Fund.

== Discography ==
=== Studio albums ===
List of albums, with selected details
Title	Details
Rough Drafts, Pt. 1	Released: March 22, 2018; Label: Born Art, Empire; Format: Digital download
Rough Drafts, Pt. 2	Released: June 4, 2019; Label: Born Art, Empire; Format: Digital download
The Love Language	Released: March 26, 2021; Label: Born Art, Empire; Format: Digital download

=== Extended plays ===
List of extended plays, with selected details
Title	Details
#NewThang	Released: September 9, 2013; Label:Born Art Music Group Atlantic; Format: Digital download

=== Mixtapes ===
List of mixtape, with selected details
Title	Details
In My Feelings	Released: August 28, 2015; Label: Atlantic; Format: Digital download

=== Singles ===
==== As lead artist ====
List of singles as lead artist, with selected chart positions, showing year released and album name
Title	Year	Peak chart positions	Album
Title	Year	US R&B Airplay	Album
"Like We Grown"	2013	—	#NewThang
"Drop It"	2013	44	Non-album singles
"Good Girl, Bad Girl"	2014	—	Non-album singles
"Me Likey" (featuring Kirko Bangz)	2014	—	Non-album singles
"Know Your Name" (featuring Sage the Gemini)	2014	—	Non-album singles
"Rock wit Me" (featuring Iamsu!)	2016	—	In My Feelings
"B&W (Benz and Wallet)"	2017	-	Non-album single
"Apocalypse"	2018	—	Rough Drafts, Pt. 1
"Good Enough"	2018	—	Non-album single
"Warning"	2019	-	Rough Drafts, Pt. 2
"Spam In a Can"	2019	-	Rough Drafts, Pt. 2
"Puddles"	2019	-	Rough Drafts, Pt. 2
In My Crocs	2019	-	Rough Drafts, Pt. 2
"Tell Me" (featuring Lil Yachty )	2019	-	Rough Drafts, Pt. 2
Tell You the Truth	2019	-	Rough Drafts, Pt. 2
"Why Worry" (featuring Leon Hlabathi)	2020	—	Non-album single
"Just Friends"	2020	—	The Love Language
"River"	2020	—	Non-album single
"Get To You"	2021	—	The Love Language
Your Everything	2021	—	The Love Language
"—" denotes items that did not chart.

==== As featured artist ====
List of singles as featured artist, with selected chart positions, showing year released and album name
Title	Year	Peak chart positions	Album
Title	Year	US R&B Airplay	Album
"My Girl" (Diggy Simmons featuring Trevor Jackson)	2014	48	Non-album single
"Keep Playin" (LianeV featuring Trevor Jackson)	2015	—	Question of Heart
"Broke Us" (Cierra Ramirez featuring Trevor Jackson)	2019	—	Over Your Head
"Don't Cry" (ADÉ featuring Trevor Jackson)	2020	—	Non-album singles
"—" denotes items that did not chart.

== Filmography ==
=== Television ===
Year	Title	Role	Notes
2006	Showtime at the Apollo	Himself	Episode: Episode #19.10
2010	Cold Case	Leon	Episode: "Bombers"
2010–2012	Eureka	Kevin Blake	16 episodes
2011	Harry's Law	Willie Blue	Episode: "In the Ghetto"
2011	Austin & Ally	Trent	Episodes: "Backups & Breakups" and "Crybabies & Cologne"
2011	Dr. Phil	Himself	Episode: "Is My Child a Star?"
2013	Criminal Minds	Tyler Rogers	17 episodes
2015	K.C. Undercover	Lincoln Treadwell	Episode: Pilot
2015	Punk'd	Himself	Episode: "Russell Simmons & Zendaya"
2016	American Crime	Kevin LaCroix	10 episodes
2017	Black-ish	Aaron Jackson	2 episodes
2018–2024	Grown-ish	Aaron Jackson	105 episodes
2018	Wild 'n Out	Himself	Episodes: "Trevor Jackson / D.R.A.M." and "Trevor Jackson / Deon Cole"
2019	Weird City	Chester	Episode: "Go to College"
2019	Ridiculousness	Himself	Guest
2025–present	Grey's Anatomy	Dr. Wes Bryant	Guest (season 21); Main cast (season 22-present)

=== Film ===
Year	Title	Role	Notes
2010	Albert! Or, My Life in the Ocean	Albert	Film
2010	The Way He Makes Them Feel: A Michael Jackson Fan Documentary	Himself	Film
2011	A Moment of Youth	Albert	Film
2011	The Joey & Elise Show	Himself	Film
2012	Let It Shine	Kris McDuffy	Film, main role
2012	A Beautiful Soul	Quincy Smith	Film
2017	Burning Sands	Zurich	Film Lead role
2018	Superfly	Youngblood Priest	Film Lead Role
2024	This Is Me... Now: A Love Story	Husband #3	Musical film

== Awards and nominations ==
Award	Year	Nominated work	Category	Result	Ref.
Young Artist Award	2012	"Himself"	33rd Young Artist Awards #Best Performance in a TV Series - Guest Starring Young Actor 14-17	Won	
Soul Train Music Awards	2019	"Himself"	Soul Train Certified Award	Won	

== See also ==
- Coco Jones
- Jennifer Hudson
- Iggy Azalea
