= Tyler James Williams =

American actor (born 1992)

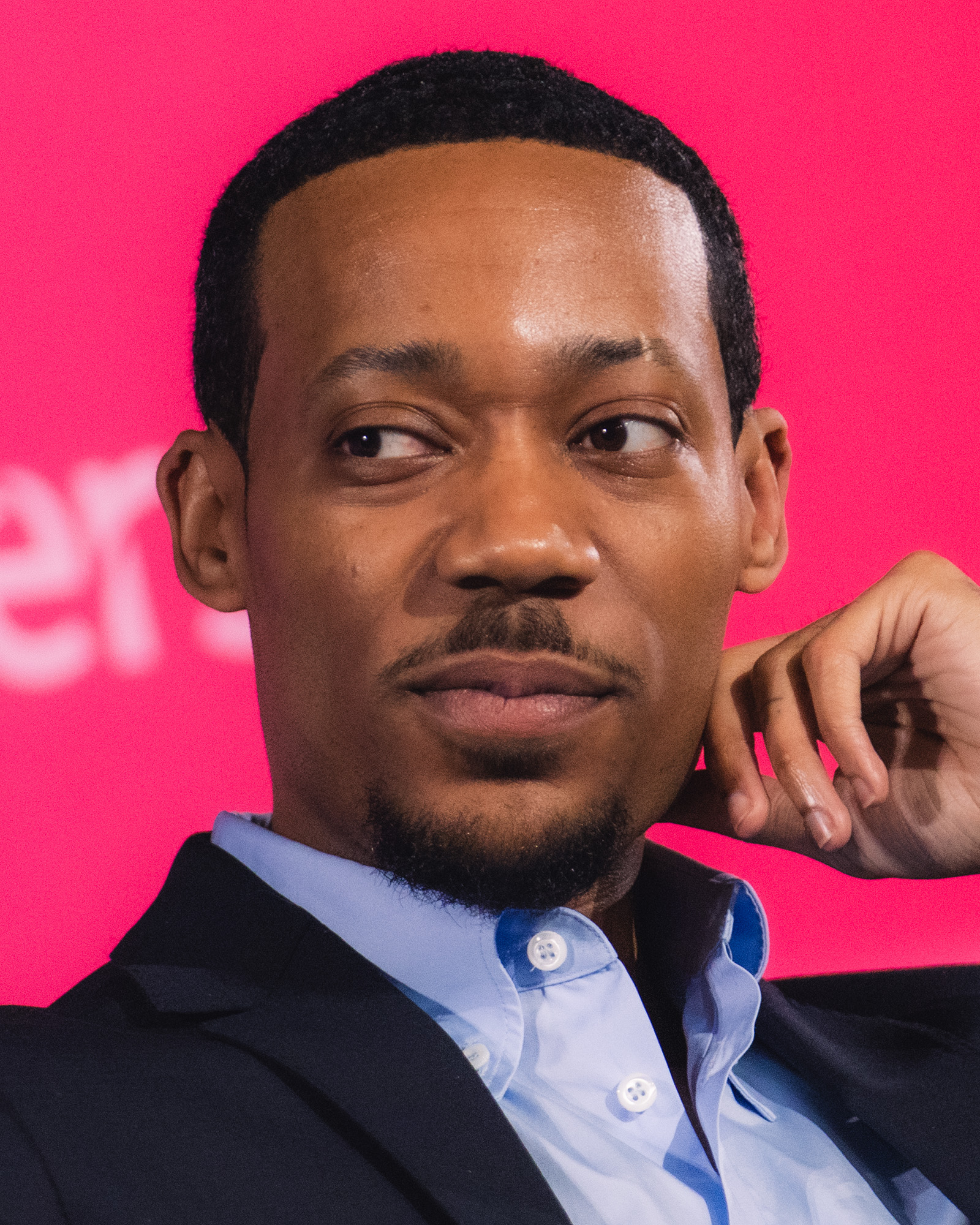
- Williams in 2026
- Born: October 9, 1992 (age 34); Westchester County, New York, U.S.
- Occupations: Actor; rapper; director; writer
- Years active: 1999–present
- Relatives: Tyrel Jackson Williams (brother); Tylen Jacob Williams (brother)

Tyler James Williams (born October 9, 1992) is an American actor and rapper. He began his career as a child actor, making several appearances on Saturday Night Live, Little Bill, and Sesame Street. Williams later rose to prominence for playing the role of Chris Rock on the UPN/CW sitcom Everybody Hates Chris (2005–2009). Following this, he starred as songwriter Cyrus DeBarge in the Disney Channel film Let It Shine (2012), and Noah on the AMC horror drama television series The Walking Dead (2014–15).

Since 2021, he has starred as Gregory Eddie on the ABC sitcom Abbott Elementary, for which he received critical acclaim including a Golden Globe Award, a Screen Actors Guild Award, and four nominations for the Primetime Emmy Award for Outstanding Supporting Actor in a Comedy Series.

In film, Williams has portrayed roles in Unaccompanied Minors (2006), Dear White People (2014), Detroit (2017) and The United States vs. Billie Holiday (2021).

== Early life ==
Williams was born in Westchester County, New York, and grew up in Yonkers, New York. His mother, Angela Williams, is a counselor, and his father, Le'Roy Williams, is a teacher and retired police sergeant. Williams has two younger siblings, both of whom are also actors: Tyrel Jackson Williams (b. 1997) and Tylen Jacob Williams (b. 2001).

== Career ==
Williams began his acting career at age 4. He later starred in Little Bill as the voice of Bobby, briefly replacing Devon Malik Beckford in 2000, and played himself (or an eponymous character, "Tyler") on the PBS series Sesame Street from 2000 to 2005. He rose to fame in September 2005 by playing the title character in the hit series Everybody Hates Chris, which finished in May 2009. He won a Young Artist Award in 2007 for his work on the show. He was also a guest star in Two for the Money, Law & Order: Special Victims Unit, and the show Hi-Jinks. In late 2009, Williams appeared in the second season of True Jackson, VP as True's love interest Justin "Lil' Shakespeare" Weber in the two-part episode "Flirting with Fame." In 2010, Williams voiced Jason Rusch in three episodes of Batman: The Brave and the Bold.

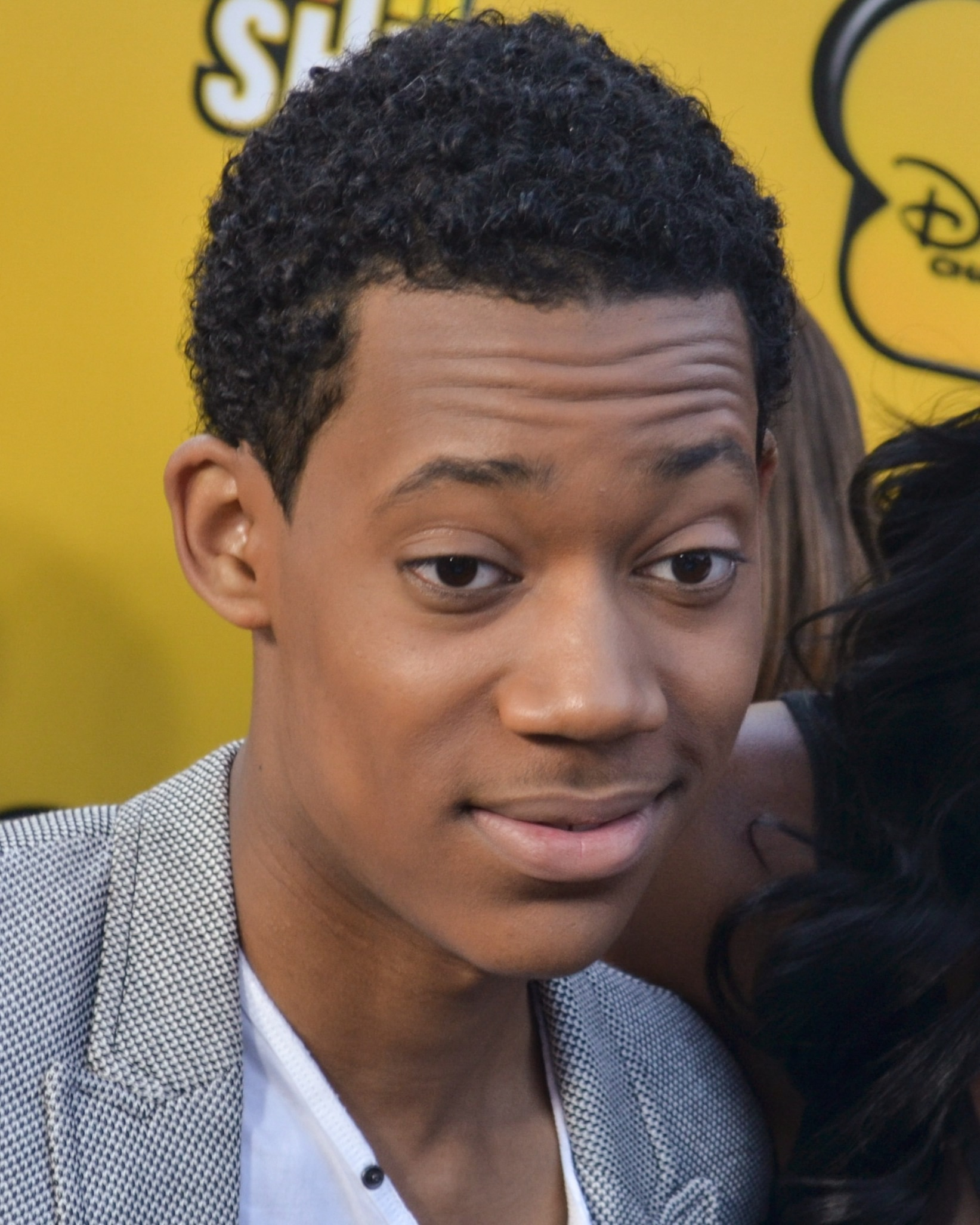
Williams in 2012

In 2012, Williams played the role of Owen in the series Go On. He also played the lead role of Cyrus DeBarge in the Disney Channel film Let It Shine alongside Coco Jones, Trevor Jackson, and Brandon Mychal Smith. Williams was also featured on nine songs on the film's soundtrack, showing off his rapping skills. The film premiered on June 15, 2012, and his songs "Don't Run Away", "Me and You", "Guardian Angel", "Let It Shine", and "Moment of Truth" all received airplay on Radio Disney. The videos were also played frequently on the Disney Channel. Williams also guest starred in the Disney XD series Lab Rats as a future version of Leo, the character played by his younger brother Tyrel Jackson Williams.

In 2014, Williams starred in Justin Simien's independent film Dear White People as Lionel Higgins, and was cast as the recurring character Noah on the television series The Walking Dead. In the same year he portrayed Steve Urkel in the Key & Peele sketch, "'Family Matters'". In 2016, Williams played Russ "Monty" Montgomery in the Criminal Minds spin-off Criminal Minds: Beyond Borders.

In 2019, Williams was cast as Jake in The Wedding Year, a teen romantic comedy film directed by Robert Luketic and starring Sarah Hyland, Jenna Dewan, Matt Shively, and Anna Camp.

In 2020, Williams played the role of Paul in The Argument. In 2021, he began playing the role of Gregory Eddie in the ABC mockumentary sitcom Abbott Elementary. At the 74th Primetime Emmy Awards, Williams earned a nomination for Outstanding Supporting Actor in a Comedy Series for the role.

== Personal life ==
Williams was diagnosed with Crohn's disease in 2017, after experiencing symptoms for three years. Since his diagnosis, he has undergone treatment, including multiple surgeries. His brother Tyrel also has the same condition.

At the time of their coming out in 2023, both his brothers described Williams as a staunch and active ally of the LGBTQ+ community.

== Filmography ==
=== Film ===
Year	Title	Role	Notes
2005	Two for the Money	Guest at Party	Uncredited
2006	The Ant Bully	Blue Teammate #1 (voice)	
2006	Unaccompanied Minors	Charlie Goldfinch	
2013	Tyler Perry Presents Peeples	Simon Peeples	
2014	Dear White People	Lionel Higgins	
2017	Detroit	Leon	
2019	The Wedding Year	Jake Riddick	
2020	The Argument	Paul	
2021	The United States vs. Billie Holiday	Lester Young	
2024	Amber Alert	Shane	

=== Television ===
Year	Title	Role	Notes
1999–2003	Saturday Night Live	Jack Black's adopted son, Young Boy, Entari Shakunte	3 episodes
2000	Sesame Street	Tyler	10 episodes
2000–2002	Little Bill	Bobby (voice)	26 episodes
2004	Judge Mooney	Melvin	
2005	Law & Order: Special Victims Unit	Kyle McGovern	Episode: "Parts"
2005–2009	Everybody Hates Chris	Chris	Lead role; 88 episodes
2009	The Cleaner	Kenji Simon	Episode: "Last American Casualty"
2009	True Jackson, VP	Justin	2 episodes
2010	Batman: The Brave and the Bold	Jason Rusch / Firestorm (voice)	3 episodes
2010	Our Show	Andre	Television film
2011	House	Landon	Episode: "Carrot or Stick"
2012	Lab Rats	Future Leo	Episode: "Back from the Future"
2012	Let It Shine	Cyrus DeBarge / Truth	Television film
2012–2013	Go On	Owen Lewis	Series regular; 19 episodes
2014	Key & Peele	Jaleel White	Episode: "Family Matters"
2014–2015	The Walking Dead	Noah	Recurring role, season 5; 10 episodes
2015	Criminal Minds	Russ "Monty" Montgomery	Episode: "Beyond Borders"
2015	Ballers	Water boy	Episode: "Raise Up"
2015	Instant Mom	Jamal	Episode: "Jamal in the Family"
2015	Comedy Bang! Bang!	Temptation	Episode: "Brie Larson Wears a Billowy Long-Sleeve Shirt and White Saddle Shoes"
2016	RePlay	Nate	Main role, web series; 12 episodes
2016–2017	Criminal Minds: Beyond Borders	Russ "Monty" Montgomery	Main role; 26 episodes
2018	Dear White People	Carson Rhodes	2 episodes
2019	Whiskey Cavalier	Edgar Standish	Main role; 13 episodes
2019	A Black Lady Sketch Show	Rome	Episode: "Where Are My Background Singers?"
2021–present	Abbott Elementary	Gregory Eddie	Main role, 88 episodes; director (episodes: "The Science Fair" and "Mall Part 2: Questions & Concerns")
2023	Harley Quinn	Hawkman (voice)	Episode: "A Very Problematic Valentine's Day Special"
2023	History of the World, Part II	Mason Dixon	3 episodes
2024	Everybody Still Hates Chris	—N/a	Producer; episode: "Everybody Still Hates the GED"
2025	It's Always Sunny in Philadelphia	Gregory Eddie	Episode: "The Gang F***s Up Abbott Elementary"

=== Video games ===
Year	Title	Role	Notes
2003	Little Bill Thinks Big	Bobby	

== Awards and nominations ==
Award	Year	Category	Nominated work	Result
Black Reel Awards	2015	Best Breakthrough Performance	Dear White People	Won
Golden Globe Awards	2023	Best Supporting Actor in a Television Series – Comedy/Musical or Drama	Abbott Elementary	Won
Hollywood Critics Association TV Awards	2022	Best Supporting Actor in a Broadcast Network or Cable Series, Comedy	Abbott Elementary	Nominated
NAACP Image Award	2006	Outstanding Actor in a Comedy Series	Everybody Hates Chris	Nominated
NAACP Image Award	2007	Outstanding Actor in a Comedy Series	Everybody Hates Chris	Won
NAACP Image Award	2008	Outstanding Actor in a Comedy Series	Everybody Hates Chris	Nominated
NAACP Image Award	2009	Outstanding Actor in a Comedy Series	Everybody Hates Chris	Nominated
NAACP Image Award	2010	Outstanding Actor in a Comedy Series	Everybody Hates Chris	Nominated
NAACP Image Award	2018	Outstanding Independent Motion Picture	Detroit	Won
NAACP Image Award	2023	Outstanding Supporting Actor in a Comedy Series	Abbott Elementary	Won
Primetime Emmy Awards	2022	Outstanding Supporting Actor in a Comedy Series	Abbott Elementary	Nominated
Primetime Emmy Awards	2023	Outstanding Supporting Actor in a Comedy Series	Abbott Elementary	Nominated
Primetime Emmy Awards	2024	Outstanding Supporting Actor in a Comedy Series	Abbott Elementary	Nominated
Primetime Emmy Awards	2026	Outstanding Supporting Actor in a Comedy Series	Abbott Elementary	Nominated
Screen Actors Guild Awards	2023	Outstanding Performance by an Ensemble in a Comedy Series	Abbott Elementary	Won
Screen Actors Guild Awards	2024	Outstanding Performance by an Ensemble in a Comedy Series	Abbott Elementary	Nominated
Teen Choice Awards	2006	Choice Actor: Comedy	Everybody Hates Chris	Nominated
Young Artist Awards	2006	Leading Young Actor (Comedy or Drama)	Everybody Hates Chris	Nominated
Young Artist Awards	2008	Best Performance in a TV Series – Leading Young Actor	Everybody Hates Chris	Won
Peabody Award	2022	Entertainment	Abbott Elementary	Won

== Discography ==
Although primarily known as an actor, Tyler James Williams has released music, primarily in connection with television soundtracks and independent singles.

=== Singles ===
Title	Year	Peak chart positions				Certifications	Album
Title	Year	US	US R&B/ HH	US Adult R&B	NZ Hot	Certifications	Album
"Stand Up"	2011	—	—	—	—		Let It Shine
"Holla at the DJ"	2012	—	—	—	—		Let It Shine
"Moment of Truth"	2013	—	—	—	—		Let It Shine
"Me and You"	2013	—	—	—	—		Let It Shine
"Guardian Angel"	2014	—	—	—	—		Let It Shine
"Don't Run Away"	2015	—	—	—	—		Let It Shine
"Me, My Brother, And A Mic"	2015	—	—	—	—		Non-album single
"—" denotes releases that did not chart or were not released in that territory.

=== Soundtrack appearances ===
Title	Year	Project
Let It Shine (with Coco Jones)	2012	Soundtrack album for the Disney Channel Original Movie Let It Shine
