= Let It Shine (film) =

2012 television film directed by Paul Hoen

- Official film poster
- Genre: Musical; Teen drama
- Teleplay by: Eric Daniel; Don D. Scott
- Story by: Eric Daniel
- Directed by: Paul Hoen
- Starring: Tyler James Williams; Coco Jones; Trevor Jackson; Brandon Mychal Smith; Dawnn Lewis; Alex Désert; Nicole Sullivan; Courtney B. Vance
- Music by: Richard Gibbs
- Country of origin: United States
- Original language: English

Production
- Producers: Amy Gibbons; Paul Hoen
- Production location: Atlanta, Georgia
- Cinematography: David A. Makin
- Editor: Girish Bhargava
- Running time: 104 minutes
- Production company: GWAVE Productions

Original release
- Network: Disney Channel
- Release: June 15, 2012

Let It Shine is a 2012 American musical television film that premiered on Disney Channel. It features an ensemble cast of Tyler James Williams, Coco Jones, Trevor Jackson and Brandon Mychal Smith. The film follows a shy, talented rapper and musician who pens romantic hip hop verses only to stand idly by as they're delivered to the girl of his dreams by his best friend, in a retelling of Edmond Rostand's 1897 play Cyrano de Bergerac. The film was directed by Paul Hoen and written by Eric Daniel and Don D. Scott. The Disney Channel Original Movie premiered on June 15, 2012 in the United States and Canada, and July 20, 2012 in the United Kingdom and Ireland.

== Plot ==
In Atlanta, 15-year-old Cyrus DeBarge is a talented musician and choir director who writes rap lyrics under the alias "Truth" because of his father Pastor Jacob's disapproval of hip-hop and his shy demeanor compared to his more outgoing best friend Kris McDuffy. Unbeknownst to Jacob, Cyrus secretly works as a busboy at a club, "Off the Street", where the music label of their childhood friend, teenage singing sensation Roxie Andrews, is sponsoring a songwriting contest. Roxie chooses Truth's song "Don't Run Away" as the winning entry but misidentifies Kris as Truth because the photo Cyrus submitted was of them both. Kris convinces Cyrus to let him keep the credit because he has feelings for Roxie. As Kris uses Cyrus' verses to get closer to both Roxie and his newfound fame, Cyrus begins to resent his friend.

As Cyrus and Roxie get to know each other, she says she can talk to him better than she can talk to Kris. Cyrus invites her to perform with the choir at his church. After their performance, Jacob humiliates Roxie in front of the congregation by condemning people living in "hip-hop-crisy". His wife Gail persuades Jacob to apologize to Roxie at the club, where he catches his son working and learns that Cyrus writes rap lyrics. At first, he's furious and grounds him, but Jacob comes to realize his son's raps carry positive messages and lifts his punishment.

The conflict between Cyrus and Kris comes to a head in a physical altercation. Club owner Levi convinces them not to let their friendship die. During a duet with Roxie, Cyrus takes Kris' place on the stage to sing "Me and You", revealing that he was Truth all along. Cyrus apologizes but Roxie storms from the stage, feeling betrayed and misled. At a rapping challenge, Cyrus calls out the pompous rapper Lord of Da Bling. Cyrus wins the trophy by revealing to the audience that Bling is a fraud, having seen him the previous week working his day job as a taxi driver.

Kris tells Roxie that Cyrus is a great person and only pretended he was not Truth for Kris. He says Cyrus is real and the one she needs to be with. Roxie goes to the church and hugs Cyrus as they sing "Let it Shine".

== Cast ==
- Tyler James Williams as Cyrus DeBarge/Truth. He is shown to be musically talented, but likes hanging back in Kris' shadow.
- Coco Jones as Roxanne "Roxie" Andrews, a famous singer and Cyrus and Kris' friend since kindergarten.
- Trevor Jackson as Kris McDuffy, Cyrus' best friend. He is mistaken for Truth.
- Brandon Mychal Smith as Lord of da Bling, the antagonist of the story who humiliates Cyrus at the club.
- Dawnn Lewis as Gail DeBarge, Cyrus' mother who openly encourages her son to follow his dreams.
- Alex Désert as Levi, club owner
- Nicole Sullivan as Lyla, Roxanne's manager and main stylist.
- Courtney B. Vance as Pastor Jacob DeBarge, Cyrus' father who, throughout most of the movie, believes that rap and hip-hop should be banned from the community. At the end of the movie, after reading Cyrus' lyrics, he accepts his son's love of rap/hip-hop and supports him.
- Algee Smith as Da Boss, another rapper whom Lord of da Bling defeats in order to make it to the Rap Grand Slam.
- Shay Roundtree as Rap Battle Host.
- Hans Daniels as Phantom, a rapper who is defeated in a rap battle by Revelation.
- Courtney Gray as Revelation, a talented rapper who is defeated by the Lord of da Bling in a rap battle.
- Chloe x Halle as Choir Members

== Production ==
The movie's soundtrack features 13 original songs by acclaimed music producers/songwriters/performers Rock Mafia, Toby Gad, David Banner, Andy Dodd, In-Q, Adam Hicks, Lindy Robbins, Dapo Torimiro, Thomas Sturges, Jon Vella and Adam Watts.

The movie was shot in Atlanta and Marietta, Georgia. The DVD was released on August 7, 2012.

== Reception ==
The premiere of Let It Shine garnered 5.7 million viewers, the high cable rating of the day, and obtained an adult 18–49 rating of 0.9, second only to Family Guy. It was the most watched Disney Channel Original Movie to that point of 2012 and was the #1 movie of the year across kids 6–11, tweens and teens. The Rap Battle Edition, which aired on June 30, was watched by 4.54 million people.

== Nominations ==
Year	Award	Category	Recipient	Result	Ref.
2013	Young Artist Award	Best Performance in a TV Movie, Miniseries, Special or Pilot – Leading Young Actor	Trevor Jackson	Nominated	

== Broadcast ==
The movie aired worldwide on Disney Channel. It premiered on June 15, 2012 in United States and Canada, on July 20, 2012 in the United Kingdom and Ireland, on August 3, 2012 in India, and on September 28, 2012 in Australia and New Zealand. In Singapore, Malaysia, and the Philippines it previewed on October 19, 2012 and premiered on November 10, 2012. In the United States, the movie aired following a new episode of Good Luck Charlie, and was itself followed by the series premiere of Gravity Falls.

== Cancelled sequel ==
In a September 2020 video posted to YouTube, Jones revealed a sequel film had been written but was eventually scrapped.

== See also ==
- The Fighting Temptations, 2003 film starring Cuba Gooding, Jr. and Beyoncé Knowles
- Joyful Noise, 2012 film starring Queen Latifah
- Rags, a similar movie released on May 28, 2012 by Nickelodeon.
- Praise This, 2023 film starring Chloe Bailey
