= The Promenade (shopping mall) =

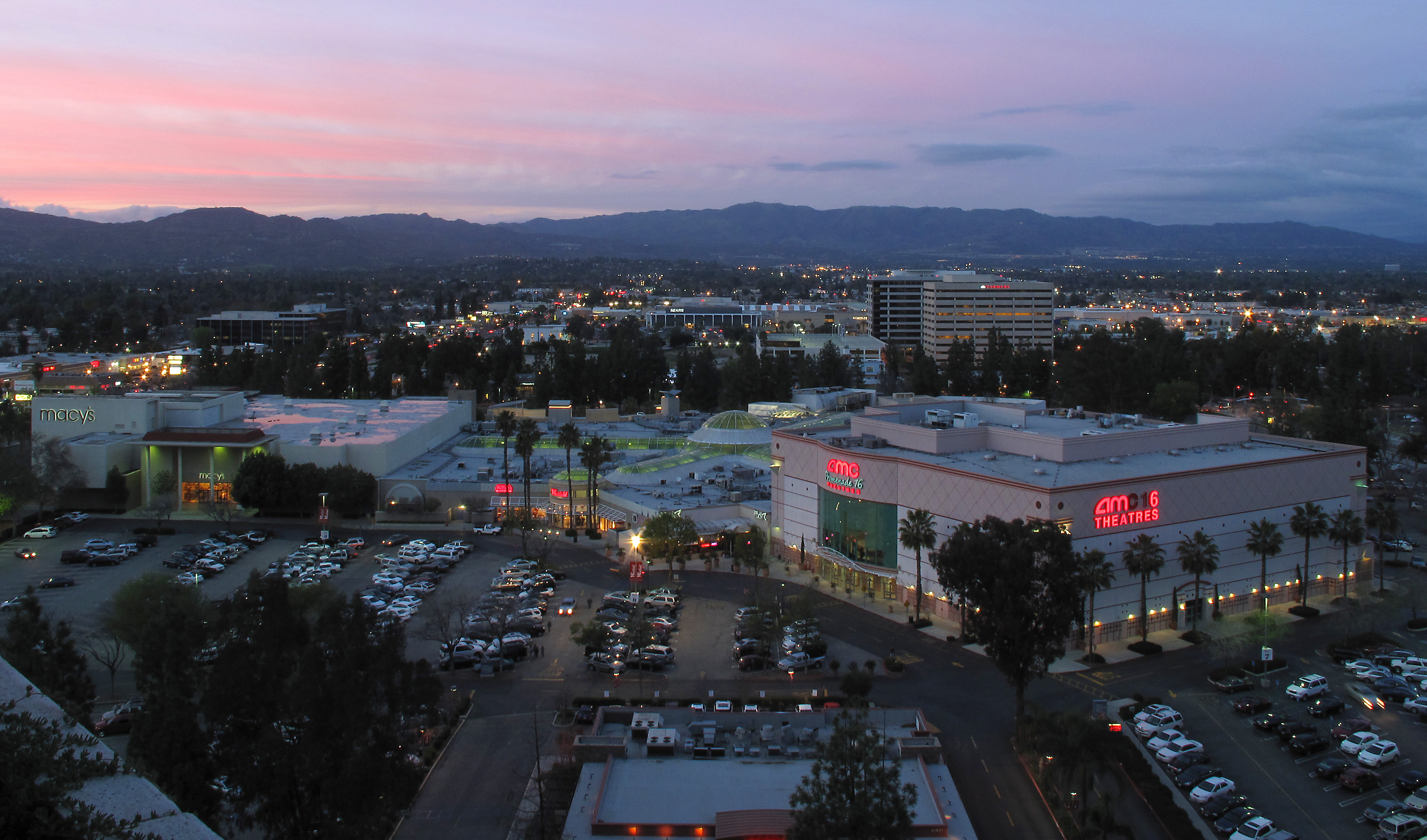
- The Promenade in 2011 before tenants left
- Location: Woodland Hills, Los Angeles, California, U.S.
- Coordinates: 34°10′51″N 118°36′15″W
- Opened: March 1973; 53 years ago
- Closed: April 2025; 1 year ago
- Demolished: 2026
- Previous names: Woodland Hills Promenade (1973–1998); Westfield Shoppingtown Promenade (1998–2005); Westfield Promenade (2005–2015)
- Developer: Coldwell Banker
- Owner: Stan Kroenke
- Num. of stores: Less than 10 (July 2016)
- Num. of anchor tenants: 0 (3 at peak)
- Floor area: 615,400 sq ft (57,170 m^{2})
- Floors: 2 (1 in former Barnes & Noble and 3 in former Macy's)
- Parking: 2,662

The Promenade (formerly known as Westfield Promenade) was a shopping mall in the Woodland Hills neighborhood of Los Angeles, California. Demolition began in January 2026 after having been a dead shopping mall for nearly a decade.

The mall was located two blocks away from the Westfield Topanga Mall, and was owned by a private investment group that includes Los Angeles Rams owner Stan Kroenke's company. Kroenke had also acquired several adjacent properties. The former mall is being replaced by the Rams Village at Warner Center.

== History ==
Opened in 1973 as the Woodland Hills Promenade, the shopping mall was originally a high-fashion center anchored by J. W. Robinson's, Bullocks Wilshire and Saks Fifth Avenue. The Bullocks Wilshire store was renamed I. Magnin in 1990 and in 1995 became a Bullock's Men's store, being renamed Macy's in 1996. The Robinson's store was closed in 1993 and sold to Bullock's, becoming Macy's in 1996 as well. Following the 1994 Northridge earthquake, Saks Fifth Avenue used the opportunity to close their underperforming store and it was demolished in 1994 for the addition of the AMC Theatre, which opened in 1996.

The 34-acre retail development (14 ha) was conceived and developed by Kaiser Aetna as part of their master commercial-retail-residential development plan for their section of the massive former Warner Ranch now known as the Warner Center. Coldwell Banker was the property manager and Ernest W. Hahn, Inc., was the general contractor. A few months before the first store opened, Kaiser Aetna sold their interest in the mall to Continental Illinois Properties for an estimated $15 million. In March 1973, Robinson's was the first anchor store to open. Both Saks and Bullock's Wilshire followed by opening five months later.

In 1989, the center was acquired by the O'Connor Group from Pan American Properties.

The center was briefly acquired by Simon Property Group in 1997, before being sold in 1998 to Westfield America, Inc., a precursor to The Westfield Group. At that time it was renamed "Westfield Shoppingtown Promenade". The "Shoppingtown" name was dropped in June 2005.

The addition of the movie theatre during renovations after the 1994 Northridge earthquake, more recent renovations in 2001 and the addition of several new retailers and restaurants briefly reignited interest in the center. A redevelopment of the Westfield Topanga (which is also owned by Westfield) in the mid-2000s overshadowed the Promenade, causing several tenants such as Barnes & Noble Booksellers to leave. In 2015, Macy's shuttered their two Promenade stores.

By September 2015, Westfield had purchased the properties that it did not own within the mall area, usually owned by anchors, to enable the company to resell the property as an entire package for other uses. Tenants have filed a lawsuit against Westfield for allowing the property to deteriorate. According to a July 2016 Los Angeles Daily News article, Westfield told their tenants that they plan to close the interior of the mall soon. Vacancy rates were estimated to be over 80%. It was also reported that Westfield officials told a Woodland Hills neighborhood council that Westfield was considering replacing the mall with upscale apartments. The Los Angeles Times called the decaying retail property "a drag on the neighborhood" while a Los Angeles City Councilman called it a "blighted site". Around this time in 2016, Westfield removed its logo from all of the malls's signage and renamed the mall The Promenade.

In October 2016, Westfield announced plans to replace the mall with a $1.5 billion mixed-use residential and retail development named Promenade 2035 that would include 1,400 upscale housing units, a grocery/pharmacy, a hotel, an office complex, plus an entertainment and sports center. The housing units would range from studio units to luxury villas. Promenade 2035 would have opened in stages, starting in 2020 and continuing on until 2035. Exterior tenants, such as the AMC Promenade 16, would gradually be moved over to Westfield Topanga's large expansion, The Village at Westfield Topanga, while the interior of the mall was being demolished.

In December 2017, Westfield was acquired by French commercial real estate company Unibail-Rodamco, which would later be renamed Unibail-Rodamco-Westfield.

In 2018, residents of the surrounding area voiced their concerns with Westfield's Promenade 2035 plan, arguing that it would not improve the inadequate existing roads and transportation systems in the surrounding area and would be detrimental to the local community, which would cause delays.

In February 2020, a few weeks prior to the COVID-19 pandemic outbreak, AMC announced its plans to move a few blocks to the nearby Westfield Topanga at the location where Sears once stood. After the pandemic severity decreased, AMC reopened nearly all of its shuttered theaters in March 2021. Since construction at the nearby Topanga was delayed due to the pandemic, AMC Theatres relocation was delayed by almost two years. The AMC Promenade closed permanently on June 1, 2022, and the new multiplex at Westfield Topanga opened the following day.

In December 2020, the Los Angeles City Council officially approved Unibail-Rodamco-Westfield's "Promenade 2035" plan to replace the dead mall with a new development that would include a sports arena, two hotels, a 28-story office tower and more than 1,400 new apartments calling it a "mini-city ... within this larger city".

In 2021, it was reported that Unibail-Rodamco-Westfield would sell its commercial properties in the United States. As part of that divestment, the dead mall was sold in March 2022 to an unnamed investor group that was later confirmed to be sports owner and real estate developer Stan Kroenke, with anticipated plans to convert the property into a mixed use development and practice facility for the Los Angeles Rams.

In February 2022, Ruth's Chris Steak House announced that it would vacate the mall by July and relocate to a nearby Woodland Hills location. After a long delay, Ruth's Chris finally moved in December 2023. Maggiano's Little Italy closed permanently at the end of April 2025. Maggiano's might have been the last business operating inside the mall.

The demolition process formally began in January 2026.

== Rams Village at Warner Center ==
Construction of temporary practice fields at the northeast corner of a nearby former office building parking lot began in November 2023 and was completed in August 2024. In April 2025, the Kroenke Organization announced its development plans and construction timetable, but no timeline was explicitly mentioned when the mall itself will finally be torn down.

== Gallery ==
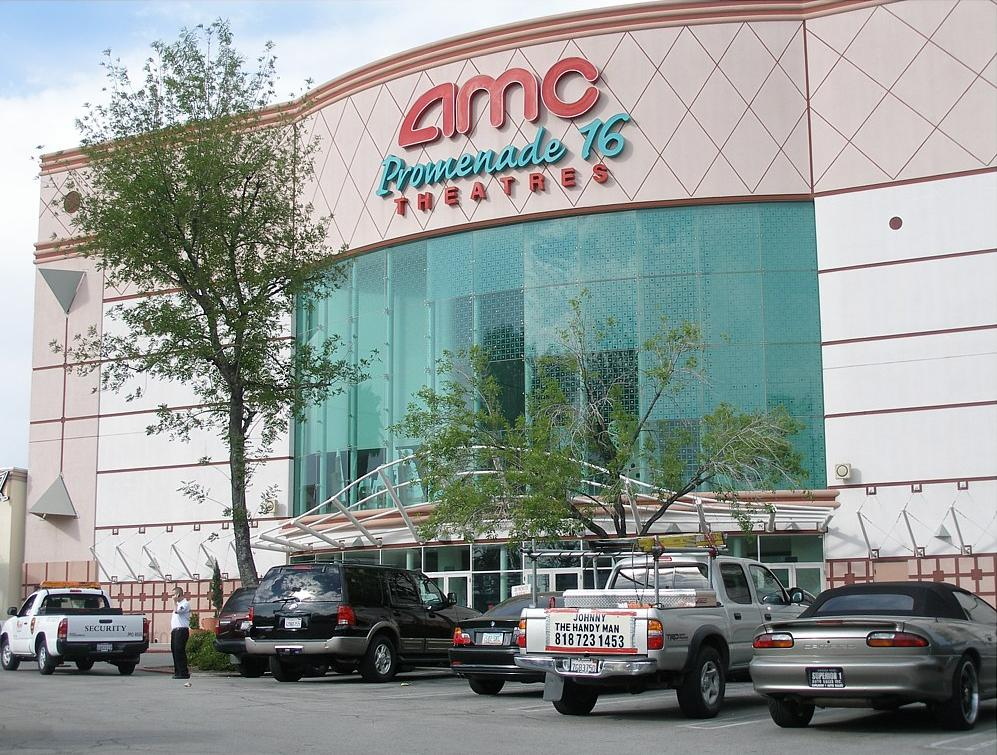
ACM Theatres Promenade 16 in 2006

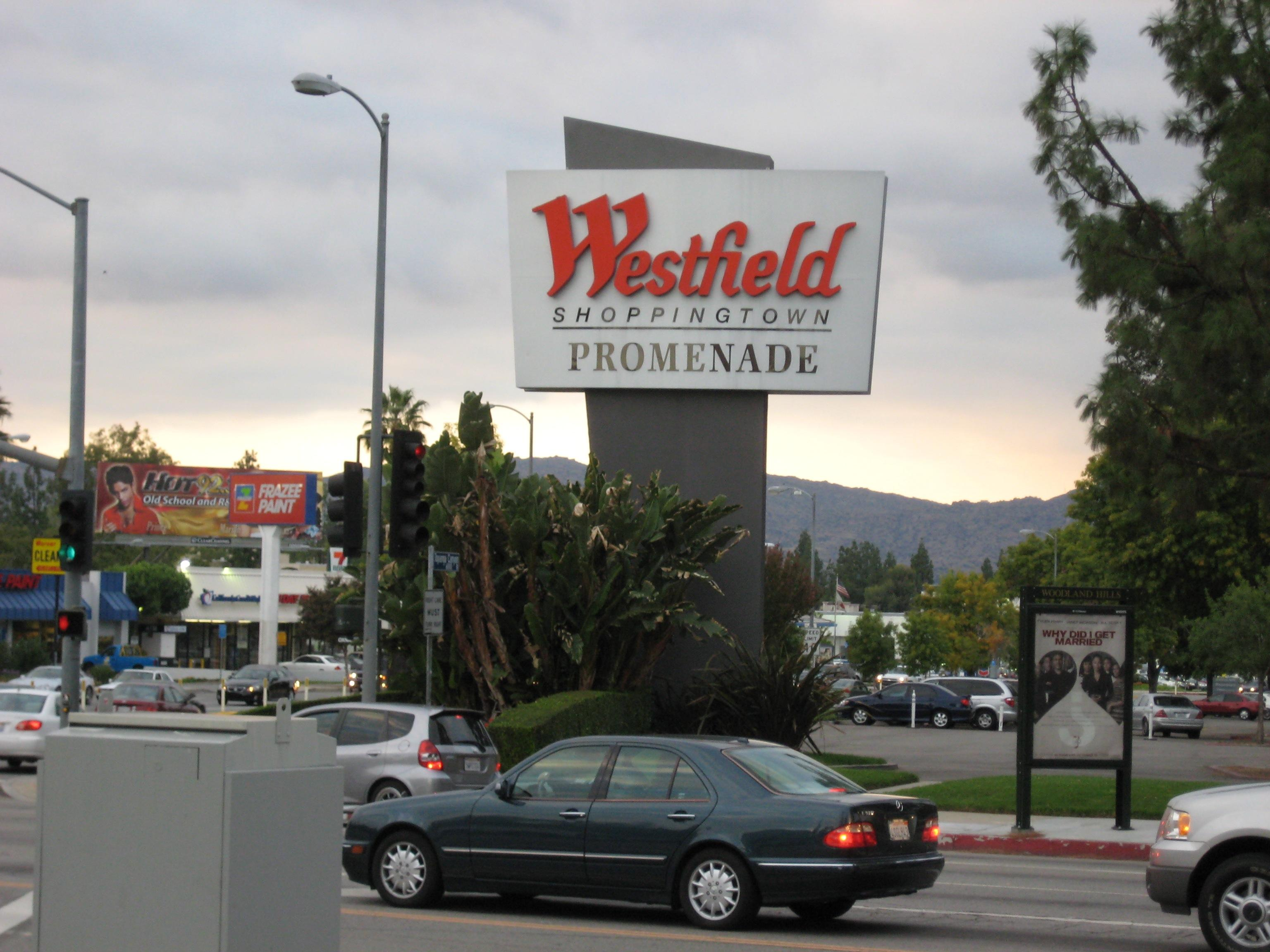
Westfield Shoppingtown Promenade sign in 2008

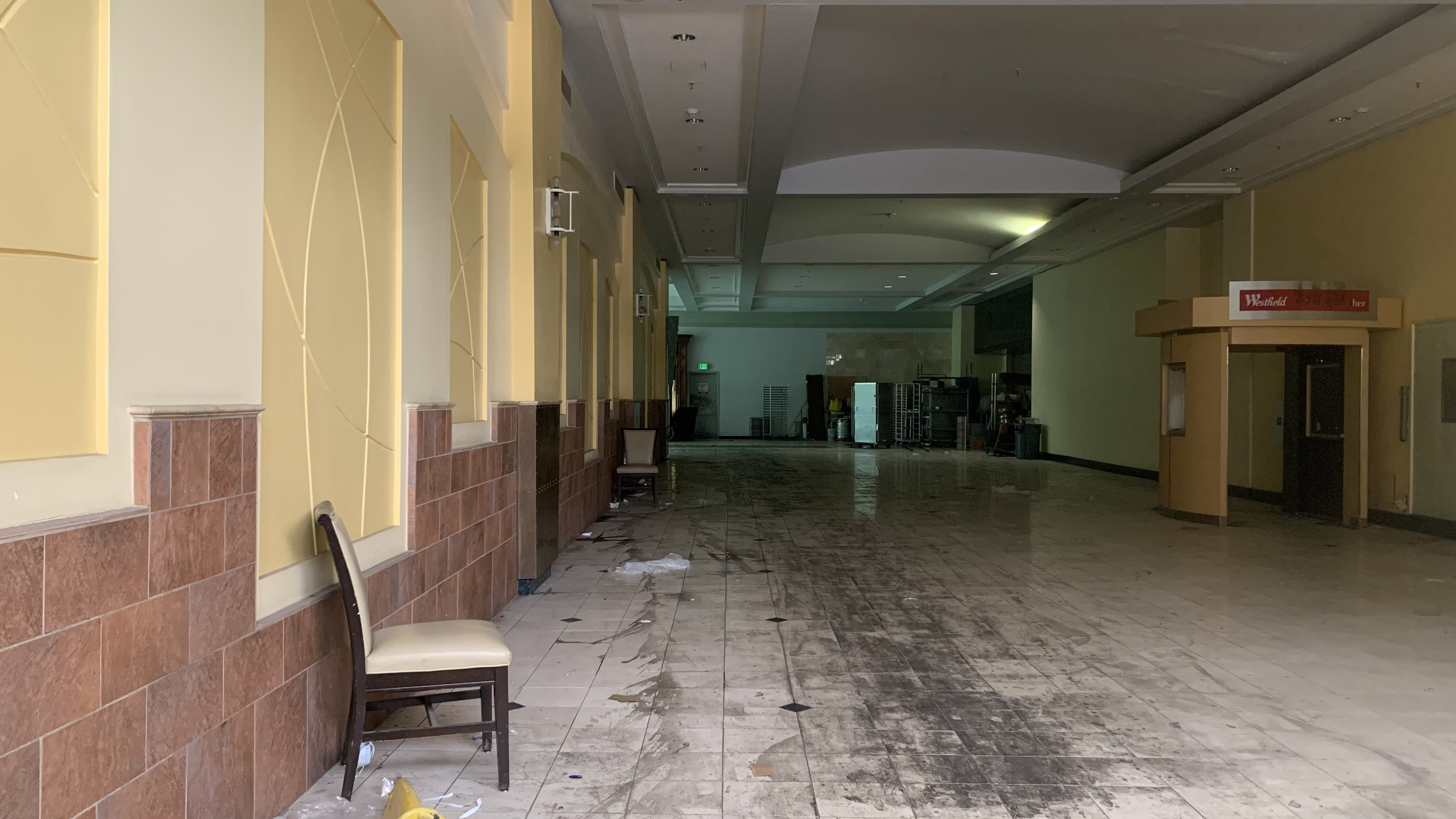
Interior of The Promenade in 2023

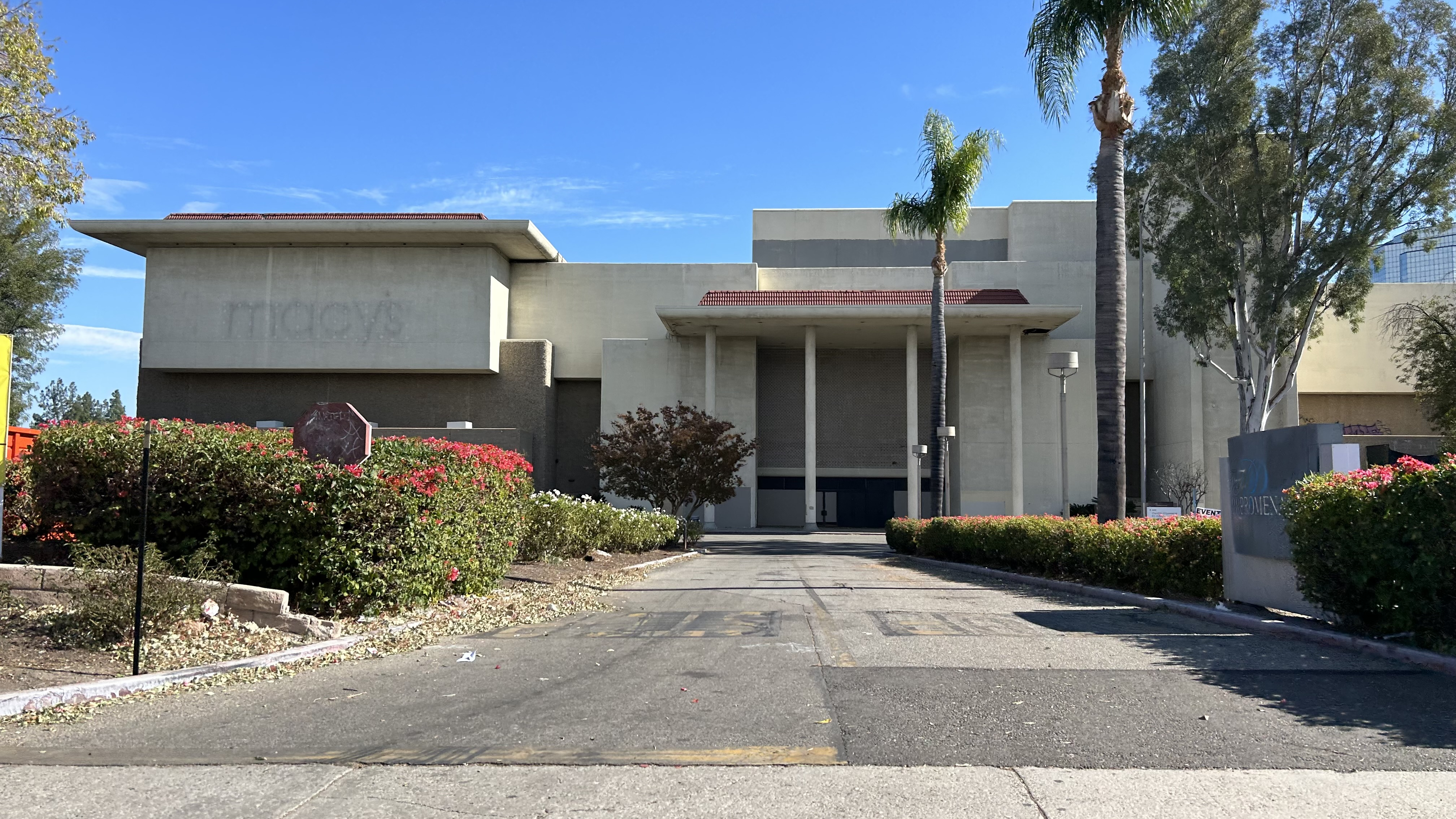
Former Macy's anchor tenant in 2024

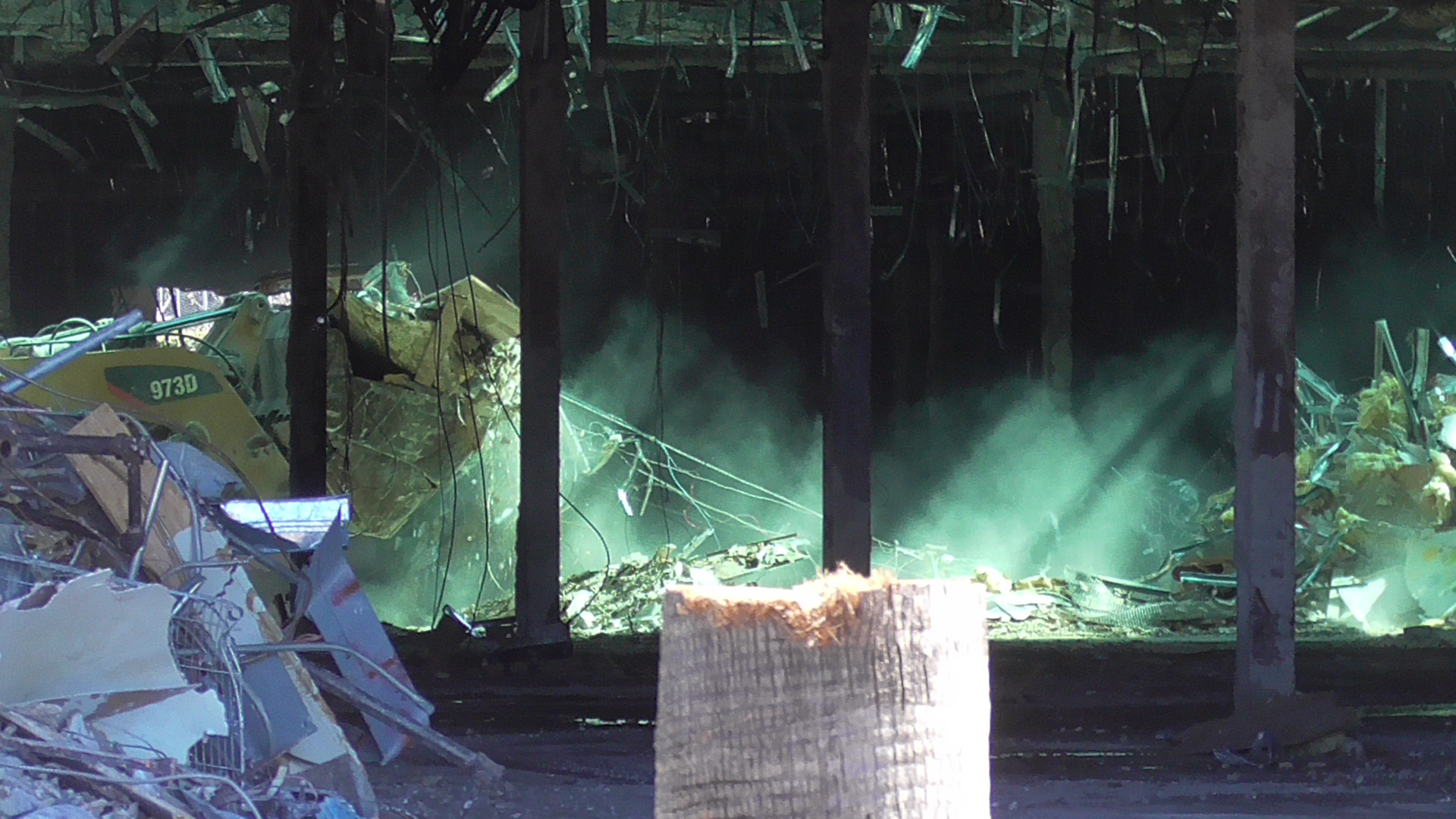
Mall interior demolition in March 2026
