= Rams Village at Warner Center =

Underdevelopment mixed-use complex

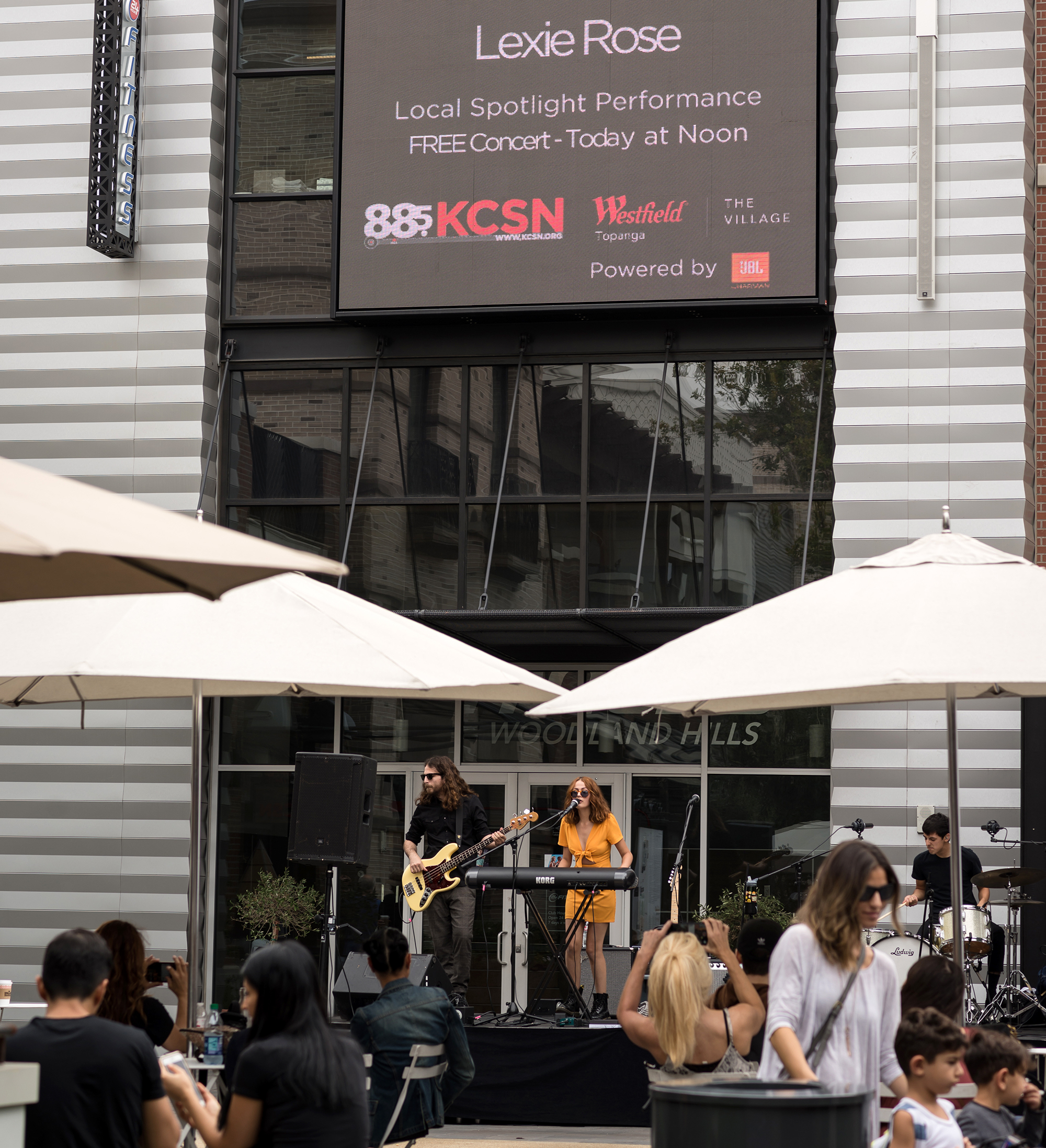
- Interactive map of Rams Village at Warner Center
- Location: Woodland Hills, Los Angeles, California, United States
- Coordinates: 34°10′53″N 118°36′8″W
- Website: Official website

Companies
- Owner: Kroenke Sports & Entertainment

Technical details
- Size: 52 acres (21 ha); 100 acres (40 ha) total with Topanga Village

The Rams Village at Warner Center in the Warner Center section of Woodland Hills neighborhood of Los Angeles, California, United States is a mixed-use complex with the headquarters of the Los Angeles Rams of the National Football League (NFL). Currently the site of a temporary team training facility, a proposed expansion will include restaurants, hotels and residences. The 52-acre complex (21 ha) was assembled from a vacant shopping mall and an abandoned corporate office building. Topanga Village, an adjacent, open-air lifestyle and retail destination, is also included in the 100 total acres (40 ha) under Kroenke ownership.

== History ==
Warner Center is a master-planned neighborhood and business district development in the San Fernando Valley which includes the Warner Center Towers office complex, the Westfield Topanga mall, and Warner Center Marriott Woodland Hills. The neighborhood Specific Plan adopted in 2013 promotes the construction of housing, shops and restaurants which would make Warner Center a more bustling urban environment where people live, work, shop and find entertainment. Thousands of apartments have been gradually added since the adoption of the specific plan. Large-scale mixed-use developments are already in the works such as a proposed $1-billion complex on Warner Center Lane with offices, stores, restaurants, residences and a hotel that would include parks and pedestrian-oriented open space.

The Promenade was a 34-acre retail development (14 ha) that opened in 1973 as part of the Kaiser Aetna master-planned commercial-retail-residential development plan for their section of the massive former Warner Ranch. In September 2015, Westfield opened a major expansion of Westfield Topanga, called The Village, an open-air shopping destination next to the largely-inactive Promenade mall. In December 2017, Westfield was acquired by French commercial real estate company Unibail-Rodamco.

In December 2020, a new development called "Promenade 2035" to replace the dead mall with a sports arena, two hotels, a 28-story office tower and more than 1,400 new apartments was approved by the Los Angeles City Council with the Unibail-Rodamco-Westfield plan being called a "mini-city ... within this larger city". The URW development plan was scrapped when Kroenke acquired the property. Demolition of The Promenade began in January 2026.

== Context ==
News reports surfaced in 2021 that sports owner and real estate developer Stan Kroenke was in discussions with URW about acquiring one of its properties when it was reported that URW would sell its commercial properties in the United States. In March 2022, the 34-acre vacant shopping mall (14 ha), The Promenade, was sold to Kroenke for approximately $150 million. A month later, Kroenke bought an adjacent vacant 13-story office building, officially named the Landmark building, on 31 acres (13 ha) of parking lots and landscaping for $175 million, formerly occupied by health insurer Anthem Inc. The 600,000 square feet (56,000 m^{2}) Westfield shopping center called Topanga Village (The Village at Westfield Topanga) was purchased in January 2023 for $325-million bringing the total property ownership to 100 acres (40 ha). This was the second largest sale of a shopping center in 2022. The Village has continued to operate as an open-air lifestyle and retail destination since then.

In mid-2023, nearby residents were sent a letter explaining that the project would be a year-round practice facility and headquarters for the Los Angeles Rams. The Rams looked to establish a permanent practice and training facility in the western San Fernando Valley. Beginning in 2016 until 2024, they used a temporary facility set up on California Lutheran University’s campus in Thousand Oaks. The Cal Lutheran site was nearly 50 miles (80 km) from SoFi Stadium while Warner Center is about 30 miles (48 km) from the major sports complex in Inglewood. Construction of temporary practice fields at the northeast corner of the former office building parking lot began in November 2023 to be ready for the 2024 NFL season. The facility is not intended for their annual training camp, and Warner Center practice fields are not open to the public. Following the end of the 2024 preseason, the Rams began conducting regular practices at their new permanent facility.

With the development plan previously approved for replacing the mall portion of the property, the company is widely expected to seek approval of similar commercial development unrelated to football along with the team headquarters, practice facility and field on the 65-acre property (26 ha), modeled on type of development of the much larger SoFi sports campus in Inglewood. While some have assumed that the former Anthem building will be torn down, the Kroenke organization could develop the land faster if the building was left intact and used as offices. City officials are encouraging dense mixed-use development for Warner Center so the area can achieve its original purpose of a downtown for the San Fernando Valley.

== Topanga Village ==
The retail portion Rams Village is called Topanga Village, an open-air lifestyle and retail destination that was created in September 2015 when Westfield opened a major expansion of Westfield Topanga, called The Village at Westfield Topanga. The open-air shopping destination is located along Topanga Canyon Boulevard, and sits between the Westfield Topanga and the remnants of the demolished Promenade mall. Kroenke purchased the shopping center in January 2023 for $325 million and renamed Topanga Village. The original 444,744-square-foot shopping center (41,318.1 m^{2}) is anchored by a 165,759-square-foot Costco (15,399.5 m^{2}). The center include a medical clinic operated by UCLA Health. Other major retailers that opened in 2015 included a 30,000-square-foot REI store (2,800 m^{2}), a 22,000-square-foot Crate & Barrel store (2,000 m^{2}), and the high-end Italian restaurant Il Fornaio.
