= Westfield Topanga =

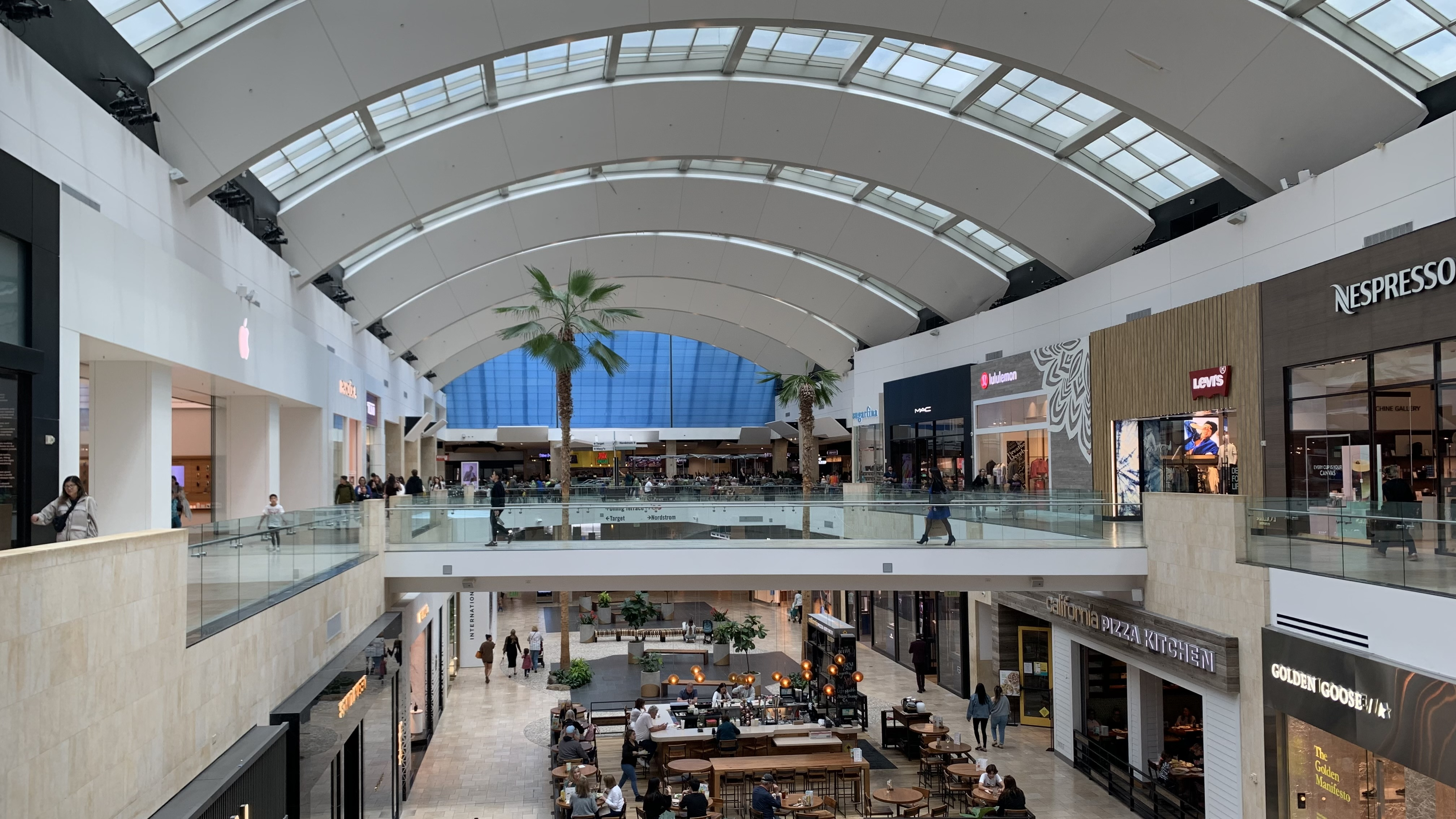
- Topanga in 2024
- Coordinates: 34°11′25″N 118°36′13″W
- Address: 6600 Topanga Canyon Boulevard, Canoga Park, California, United States
- Opened: February 10, 1964; 62 years ago
- Previous names: Topanga Plaza (1964–1999); Westfield Shoppingtown Topanga (1999–2005); Westfield Topanga & The Village (2015–2022)
- Developer: May Centers, Inc.
- Manager: Unibail-Rodamco-Westfield
- Owner: Unibail-Rodamco-Westfield (55%)
- Architect: Victor Gruen Associates
- Num. of stores: 361
- Num. of anchor tenants: 4
- Floor area: 1,588,050 sq ft (147,535 m^{2})
- Floors: 2 (3 in Macy's and Nordstrom, 4-5 in the parking garages)
- Parking: 6,041 spaces
- Website: westfield.com/topanga

Westfield Topanga is a shopping mall in the Canoga Park neighborhood of Los Angeles, California. It has 1,588,050 square feet (147,535 m^{2}) of gross leasable area and is anchored by Nordstrom, Macy's, Target, and AMC Theatres. The mall has been owned by Westfield-affiliated companies since 1993, and has been owned by the present-day Unibail-Rodamco-Westfield since 2018.

== History ==
Opened on February 10, 1964, Topanga Plaza was one of California's first major enclosed shopping malls. The original anchors were May Company, Montgomery Ward, and The Broadway. The "Rain Fountain" on the south end consisted of several circular arrays of vertical monofilament lines stretching from the ceiling to a raised landscaped area on the floor. The effect of the rain was created by droplets of recirculated glycerine slowly descending along the wetted lines.

An indoor ice skating rink, Ice Capades Chalet, was located on the first floor of the southern section of the mall, surrounded by the original food court. The ice skating rink was closed in the late 1970s.

In April 1984, Nordstrom opened as the mall's fourth anchor.

In 1992, the original developer May Centers, Inc., was renamed CenterMark Properties and was sold by parent company May Department Stores in 1993 to a consortium led by Westfield Holdings, Ltd., a predecessor of Westfield Group.

In 1993, the May Company store became Robinsons-May. In 1996, The Broadway closed. Sears opened in the space, relocating from its nearby Fallbrook Center mall.

In 2001, Montgomery Ward shuttered as a result of the chain ending operations.

In 2005, Nordstrom relocated on the Sears side of the mall. Alongside, the Wards store was razed, replacing it with a two-story Target store, which opened a year later on October 6, 2006.

In 2006, Robinsons-May became Macy's, and Target opened.

In 2008, Neiman Marcus opened as its fifth anchor, which replaced the original Nordstrom store.

On January 28, 2015, it was announced that the Sears anchor store would close.

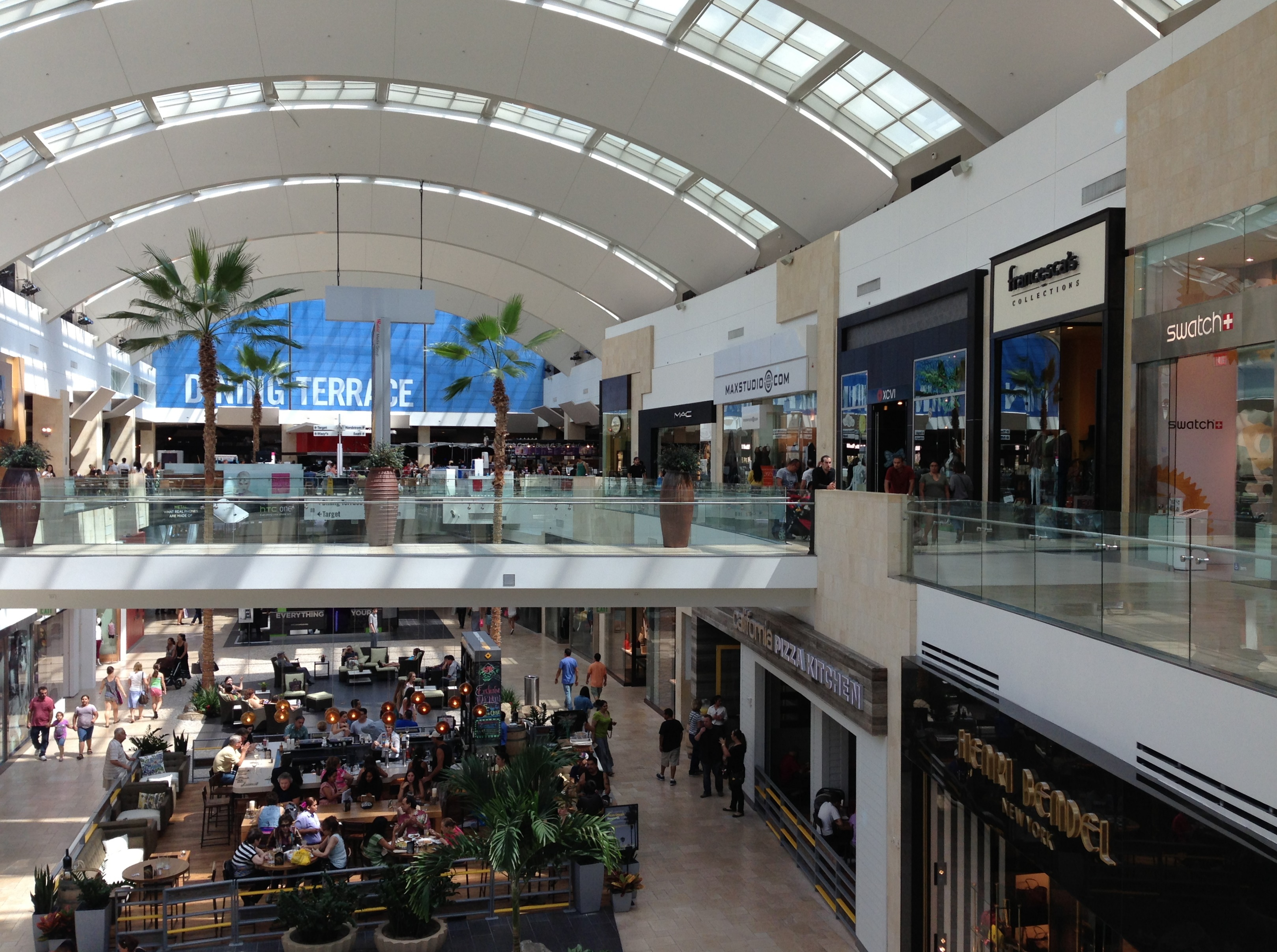
Westfield Topanga in 2013

In September 2015, Westfield opened a major expansion of Westfield Topanga, called The Village at Westfield Topanga. The open-air shopping destination was located along Topanga Canyon Boulevard, and sits between the Westfield Topanga and the largely-inactive Promenade mall. The Village was purchased in January 2023 for $325 million by Rams owner Stan Kroenke, bringing his total property ownership in Warner Center to 100 acres (40 ha). The Village, since renamed Topanga Village, will continue to operate as an open-air lifestyle and retail destination. The Promenade mall and a former Anthem office building are being redeveloped into the Rams Village at Warner Center which is their headquarters and practice facility.

In 2020, the Islands restaurant, which had been located at two different locations of the mall, lost its lease and closed its doors.

Westfield turned the previous Sears anchor store into an entertainment district featuring a new food hall named "Topanga Social," a retail center, and 12-screen AMC Theatre. The theater, dubbed "AMC DINE-IN Topanga 12", opened on June 2, 2022. Some food options include bacon chicken mac & cheese bowl, chicken cobb salad, royal bacon brie burger, chocolate hazelnut churros, and mega milkshakes, which are cooked on the premises and delivered directly to the patron's assigned seating area.

By 2023, after the government lockdown, Westfield Topanga had announced several newest additions, among them are Hermès, Levis, Bottega Veneta, Dior, Saint Laurent, Swatch, Celine, Uniqlo, FYE, and Abercrombie & Fitch.

On March 6, 2026, Saks Global announced the closure of 12 Saks Fifth Avenue and 3 Neiman Marcus locations nationwide, including the Neiman Marcus store at Westfield Topanga. The store closed in May 2026.

== In popular culture ==
- Divorce American Style (1967): Starring Dick Van Dyke, Debbie Reynolds, Jean Simmons, Jason Robards, and Van Johnson, this film features a scene where Barbara Harmon (Reynolds) and Fern Blandsforth (Emmaline Henry) are shopping. They have a conversation next to a pillar (left side of screen) that says Topanga Plaza.
- One Hour Photo (2002) starring Robin Williams, Connie Nielsen, Eriq La Salle and Gary Cole
- Captain America: The Winter Soldier (2014): The scene used in the film was shot in the Apple Store.
- Parks and Recreation (2009). This NBC comedy includes scenes at Westfield Topanga during an episode of the fourth season entitled, "Pawnee Rangers."
- The Last Man On Earth (2015) starring Will Forte and Kristen Schaal
