= Criminal Minds (franchise) =

American media franchise

- Created by: Jeff Davis
- Original work: Criminal Minds
- Owner: CBS Studios (through CBS Entertainment Group) (Skydance)

Films and television
- Television series: Criminal Minds; Criminal Minds: Suspect Behavior; Criminal Minds: Beyond Borders; Criminal Minds: Evolution

Games
- Video game: Criminal Minds

Criminal Minds is a media franchise of American television programs created by Jeff Davis. The police procedural series follow the members of the Behavioral Analysis Unit (BAU) of the FBI.

The inaugural television series aired on CBS from September 22, 2005 to February 19, 2020. In 2022, the series would be revived by Paramount+ under the title Criminal Minds: Evolution.

Two spin-offs have been produced: Criminal Minds: Suspect Behavior on February 16, 2011, and Criminal Minds: Beyond Borders on March 16, 2016. A true crime series, titled The Real Criminal Minds was ordered by Paramount+ in 2021. A video game based on the series was released in April 2012.

Three television series make up the Criminal Minds franchise: Criminal Minds, Suspect Behavior, and Beyond Borders. All series in total amount to 403 episodes across 22 seasons of television.

== Overview ==
=== Criminal Minds ===
The series is set primarily at the BAU based in Quantico, Virginia, and focuses on profiling the criminal, called the unsub (unknown subject), rather than the actual crime itself. The focal point of the series follows a group of FBI profilers who set about catching various criminals through behavioral profiling. The plot focuses on the team working cases and the personal lives of the characters, depicting the hardened life and statutory requirements of a profiler.

==== Criminal Minds: Evolution ====
In February 2021, a revival of the series was in early development at Paramount+, with 10 episodes officially green-lit. It was confirmed to still be in development during the Television Critics Association winter press tour a year later. In July 2022, Paramount+ officially gave the revival a full season order. The main cast of the original series returned, with the absence of Daniel Henney and Matthew Gray Gubler (the latter who has been with the series since the first episode). It began filming in August 2022.

Evolution has since been referred to as a continuation of the CBS series, rather than a separate series entirely. Its "first season" was released by CBS Home Entertainment as the "sixteenth season" of the series overall.

=== Criminal Minds: Suspect Behavior ===
In early 2009, Michael Ausiello from Entertainment Weekly said that he and studios were discussing the possibility of a spin-off of the procedural crime drama Criminal Minds. Studio Producer Ed Bernero confirmed it by disclosing that "it's safe to say there will be something soon." The show had a completely new cast, with the exception of Kirsten Vangsness, who reprised her role as Penelope Garcia. By late 2010, the director had been chosen, and the casting completed. It was announced that Forest Whitaker would star. Whitaker's character, Samuel "Sam" "Coop" Cooper, and his team were introduced in Criminal Minds Season 5. Richard Schiff had a recurring role as FBI Director Jack Fickler.

The series centers on the FBI's Behavioral Analysis Unit Red cell team a hand-picked elite team which operates outside of the Bureaucracy way. The team is led by veteran FBI profiler SSA Sam Cooper and they report only to the Director of the FBI.

=== Criminal Minds: Beyond Borders ===
A proposed new series in the Criminal Minds franchise was announced in January 2015 entitled Criminal Minds: Beyond Borders. Gary Sinise and Anna Gunn had been cast in the lead roles of Jack Garrett and Lily Lambert, with Tyler James Williams and Daniel Henney being cast as Russ "Monty" Montgomery and Matthew "Matt" Simmons, respectively. Criminal Minds: Beyond Borders follows an elite team of FBI agents solving cases that involve American citizens on international soil. CBS aired a backdoor pilot on an episode of Criminal Minds on April 8, 2015, introducing the characters with a crossover episode titled "Beyond Borders".

On May 8, 2015, CBS announced that Criminal Minds: Beyond Borders, has been picked up for the 2015–16 season, however, it was soon announced that Gunn had departed the series, with Alana de la Garza and Annie Funke further being cast as series regulars. The series was originally intended to premiere on March 2, 2016, but was pushed back by two weeks and instead premiered on March 16, 2016, and filled the Wednesday 10:00pm time slot, airing immediately after the original Criminal Minds. On May 16, 2016, CBS renewed the series for a second season. On May 14, 2017, CBS canceled the series after two seasons due to low ratings.

== Series ==
| Series | Television seasons | | | | | | | | | | | | | | | | | | | |
| Series | 2005–06 | 2006–07 | 2007–08 | 2008–09 | 2009–10 | 2010–11 | 2011–12 | 2012–13 | 2013–14 | 2014–15 | 2015–16 | 2016–17 | 2017–18 | 2018–19 | 2019–20 | 2022–23 | 2023–24 | 2024–25 | 2025–26 | Duration |
|---|---|---|---|---|---|---|---|---|---|---|---|---|---|---|---|---|---|---|---|---|
| Criminal Minds | 1 | 2 | 3 | 4 | 5 | 6 | 7 | 8 | 9 | 10 | 11 | 12 | 13 | 14 | 15 | Evolution | | | | 2005–2020; 2022–present |
| Criminal Minds | 1 | 2 | 3 | 4 | 5 | 6 | 7 | 8 | 9 | 10 | 11 | 12 | 13 | 14 | 15 | 16 | 17 | 18 | 19 | 2005–2020; 2022–present |
| Criminal Minds: Suspect Behavior | | | | | Pilot | 1 | | | | | | | | | | | | | | 2010, 2011 |
| Criminal Minds: Beyond Borders | | | | | | | | | | Pilot | 1 | 2 | | | | | | | | 2015, 2016–17 |

== Characters ==
| Character | No. of episode appearances | | | | Actor | First | Last | | | |
| Character | Series | | | | Actor | First | Last | | | |
| Character | Criminal Minds | Suspect Behavior | Beyond Borders | Evolution | Actor | First | Last | | | |
|---|---|---|---|---|---|---|---|---|---|---|
| Character | Jason Gideon | Main | | | Actor | First | Last | Mandy Patinkin | 2005 | 2007 |
| Aaron Hotchner | Main | | | | Thomas Gibson | 2005 | 2016 | | | |
| Elle Greenaway | Main | | | | Lola Glaudini | 2005 | 2006 | | | |
| Derek Morgan | Main | | | | Shemar Moore | 2005 | 2017 | | | |
| Spencer Reid | Main | | | Guest | Matthew Gray Gubler | 2005 | 2020 | | | |
| Jennifer Jareau | Main | | | Main | A. J. Cook | 2005 | present | | | |
| Penelope Garcia (Note: Kirsten Vangsness joined the main cast of Suspect Behavior throughout the series, while also maintaining her original role on Criminal Minds. Vangsness is also the first and only actress to appear in all three series in the franchise.) | Main | Main | Guest | Main | Kirsten Vangsness | 2005 | present | | | |
| Emily Prentiss | Main | | Guest | Main | Paget Brewster | 2006 | present | | | |
| David Rossi | Main | | Guest | Main | Joe Mantegna | 2007 | present | | | |
| Ashley Seaver | Main | | | | Rachel Nichols | 2010 | 2011 | | | |
| Alex Blake | Main | | | | Jeanne Tripplehorn | 2012 | 2014 | | | |
| Kate Callahan | Main | | | | Jennifer Love Hewitt | 2014 | 2015 | | | |
| Tara Lewis | Main | | | Main | Aisha Tyler | 2015 | present | | | |
| Luke Alvez | Main | | | Main | Adam Rodriguez | 2016 | present | | | |
| Stephen Walker | Main | | | | Damon Gupton | 2016 | 2017 | | | |
Suspect Behavior
| Sam Cooper | Guest | Main | | | Forest Whitaker | 2010 | 2011 | | | |
| Beth Griffith | | Main | | | Janeane Garofalo | 2011 | 2011 | | | |
| Johnatan Sims | Guest | Main | | | Michael Kelly | 2010 | 2011 | | | |
| Gina LaSalle | Guest | Main | | | Beau Garrett | 2010 | 2011 | | | |
| Mick Rawson | Guest | Main | | | Matt Ryan | 2010 | 2011 | | | |
Beyond Borders
| Jack Garrett | Guest | | Main | | Gary Sinise | 2015 | 2017 | | | |
| Clara Seger | Guest | | Main | | Alana de la Garza | 2016 | 2017 | | | |
| Matthew Simmons (Note: Daniel Henney joined the main cast of Criminal Minds in the thirteenth season after Criminal Minds: Beyond Borders was cancelled.) | Main | | Main | | Daniel Henney | 2015 | 2020 | | | |
| Russ Montgomery | Guest | | Main | | Tyler James Williams | 2015 | 2017 | | | |
| Mae Jarvis | | | Main | | Annie Funke | 2016 | 2017 | | | |

== Crossovers ==
| Crossover between | | | Episode | Type | Actors crossing over | Date aired |
| Series A | Series B | Series C | Episode | Type | Actors crossing over | Date aired |
|---|---|---|---|---|---|---|
| Criminal Minds | Suspect Behavior | —N/a | "The Fight" (Criminal Minds season 5 episode 18) | Backdoor Pilot | Forest Whitaker as SSA Sam Cooper; Michael Kelly as SSA Jonathan "Prophet" Simms; Matt Ryan as SSA Mick Rawson; Beau Garrett as SSA Gina LaSalle | April 7, 2010 |
The BAU team travels to San Francisco to investigate the murders of several homeless men that occurred over the last three years. They begin working with another team of BAU agents who are investigating the murders of father-daughter duos, also occurring over the last three years, when both cases are connected. This episode launches the spin-off, Criminal Minds: Suspect Behavior.
| Criminal Minds | Beyond Borders | —N/a | "Beyond Borders" (Criminal Minds season 10 episode 19) | Backdoor Pilot | Gary Sinise as SSA Jack Garrett; Daniel Henney as Matthew Simmons; Tyler James Williams as Rusty "Monty" Montgomery | April 8, 2015 |
When a family of four is abducted while on vacation in Barbados and the case is connected to one investigated in Florida the previous year, the BAU works with Jack Garrett and his International Response Team to find out who is behind these crimes.
| Beyond Borders | Criminal Minds | —N/a | "The Harmful One" (Beyond Borders season 1 episode 1) | Guest Appearance | Joe Mantegna as SSA David Rossi | March 16, 2016 |
David Rossi in the opening scene is at the firing range with Jack Garrett.
| Beyond Borders | Criminal Minds | —N/a | "Denial" (Beyond Borders season 1 episode 3) | Guest Appearance | Kirsten Vangsness as Penelope Garcia | March 30, 2016 |
Penelope Garcia in the opening scene looking for her octopus coffee mug that Russ Montgomery took.
| Criminal Minds | Beyond Borders | —N/a | "Spencer" (Criminal Minds season 12 episode 13) | Guest Appearance | Alana de la Garza as Clara Seger; Daniel Henney as Matthew Simmons | February 15, 2017 |
When BAU member Spencer Reid gets in trouble in Mexico, the team enlists the services of the Clara Seger and Matthew Simmons from the International Response Team for their help.
| Beyond Borders | Criminal Minds | —N/a | "Lost Souls" (Beyond Borders season 2 episode 1) | Guest Appearance | Kirsten Vangsness as Penelope Garcia | March 8, 2017 |
Monty asks Garcia for help looking for the next of kin of the 23-member American church group that wenting missing in Tanzania.
| Beyond Borders | Criminal Minds | —N/a | "Il Mostro" (Beyond Borders season 2 episode 2) | Guest Appearance | Joe Mantegna as David Rossi | March 15, 2017 |
When two American couples are gunned down in Florence in Italy, the IRT works with David Rossi (Joe Mantegna) and the Italian authorities to determine whether or not Italy's most infamous serial killer has returned.
| Beyond Borders | Criminal Minds | —N/a | "Type A" (Beyond Borders season 2 episode 10) | Guest Appearance | Paget Brewster as Emily Prentiss | May 3, 2017 |
BAU Unit Chief, Emily Prentiss, brings a case to the IRT about an American that has committed a crime in Taipei that’s similar to an unsolved case in New York.

== Video game ==
CBS announced in October 2009 that Legacy Interactive would develop a video game based on the show. The game would require players to examine crime scenes for clues to help solve murder mysteries. The interactive puzzle game was released in 2012, but the show's cast was not involved with the project so it did not feature any of their voices.
