= Criminal Minds (disambiguation) =

Criminal Minds is a 2005 American police procedural crime drama television series.

Criminal Minds may also refer to:

== Film and television ==
- Criminal Minds (franchise), media franchise of American television programs created by Jeff Davis
  - Criminal Minds (video game), 2012 video game
- Criminal Minds: Suspect Behavior, 2011 American television series
- Criminal Minds: Beyond Borders, 2016 American television series
- Criminal Minds (South Korean TV series), a 2017 South Korean television series

== Music ==
- The Criminal Minds, a British hip-hop group

== See also ==
- Criminal Mind (disambiguation)
