= Criminal Minds: Beyond Borders season 2 =

Season of television series Criminal Minds: Beyond Borders

Criminal Minds: Beyond Borders
- Season 2
- DVD cover
- Starring: Gary Sinise; Alana de la Garza; Daniel Henney; Tyler James Williams; Annie Funke
- No. of episodes: 13

Release
- Original network: CBS
- Original release: March 8 – May 17, 2017

Season chronology
- ← Previous; Season 1

The second and final season of Criminal Minds: Beyond Borders was ordered on May 16, 2016, by CBS. The season premiered on March 8, 2017. The series concluded on May 17, 2017.

== Cast ==
=== Main ===
- Gary Sinise as Unit Chief Jack Garrett
- Alana de la Garza as Senior SSA Clara Seger
- Daniel Henney as SSA Matthew "Matt" Simmons
- Tyler James Williams as Tech Analyst Russ "Monty" Montgomery
- Annie Funke as SSA Mae Jarvis

=== Criminal Minds characters ===
- Kirsten Vangsness as Technical Analyst Penelope Garcia
- Joe Mantegna as Supervisory Special Agent David Rossi
- Paget Brewster as Supervisory Special Agent Emily Prentiss

=== Recurring ===
- Kelly Frye as Kristy Simmons
- Ezra Dewey as Jake Simmons
- Declan Whaley as David Simmons
- Matt Cohen as Special Agent Ryan Garrett
- Sherry Stringfield as Karen Garrett
- Esai Morales as Mateo "Matt" Cruz
- Kim Rhodes as Executive Assistant Director Linda Barnes

== Episodes ==
No. overall	No. in season	Title	Directed by	Written by	Original release date	Prod. code	US viewers (millions)
14	1	"Lost Souls"	Alec Smight	Erica Messer	March 8, 2017	201	5.35
When 23 members of a Texas church group inexplicably disappear from a train in Tanzania, the IRT suspects the group is not what it seems to be. Meanwhile, Monty works with Penelope Garcia (Kirsten Vangsness) to locate the victims' relatives.
15	2	"Il Mostro"	Leon Ichaso	Christopher Barbour	March 15, 2017	204	5.37
When an American couple is gunned down while taking a college course in Florence, Italy, the IRT works with SSA David Rossi (Joe Mantegna) and local authorities to determine whether or not Italy's most infamous serial killer has resurfaced.
16	3	"The Devil's Breath"	Oz Scott	Adam Glass	March 22, 2017	202	4.78
When a New York City man is found dead outside a Bogotá, Colombia hotel and his bank account is revealed to have been cleaned out hours before his death, the IRT sets out to determine whether or not he committed suicide and the reason for abruptly closing his account.
17	4	"Pretty Like Me"	Greg Prange	Daniele Nathanson	March 29, 2017	206	4.97
While vacationing in Seoul, South Korea in an attempt to fulfill his late mother's dying wish of finding his grandmother, Simmons learns that an Indiana English teacher living in the city disappeared from a local nightclub and was found dead with her face disfigured, so the IRT works with the Korean National Police to track down the killer.
18	5	"Made In..."	Jeannot Szwarc	Erica Meredith	April 5, 2017	205	4.61
When a Dhaka, Bangladesh taxi driver and two New York City entrepreneurs (Richard Speight Jr. and Rob Benedict) are abducted by a group of masked men, the IRT believes that the kidnappers are people with whom the entrepreneurs were doing business in the country. Meanwhile, Clara juggles moving into a new home and moving on from her late husband, Brad.
19	6	"Cinderella and the Dragon"	Diana C. Valentine	Matthew Lau	April 12, 2017	203	5.74
When the body of an American flight attendant turns up at the baggage claim at Singapore Changi Airport and security cameras capture her co-worker fleeing the scene covered in blood, the IRT sets out to determine whether or not the prime suspect is innocent and find her before local authorities do, as their justice system against foreigners involves handing down the harshest sentences possible without carefully weighing the evidence.
20	7	"La Huesuda"	Rod Holcomb	Adam Glass	April 12, 2017	207	4.72
When a teenage San Diego, California boy is stabbed to death, painted red from head to toe, and found hanging from a tree in a Tijuana, Mexico square, the IRT attempts to track down a pair of killers obsessed with an ancient Mexican folk tale. Meanwhile, Garrett worries for the safety of his son, Ryan, upon learning he has been secretly going undercover to spy on a drug-dealing biker gang alone.
21	8	"Pankration"	Laura Belsey	Ticona S. Joy	April 19, 2017	208	4.74
When a Queens, New York man is beaten to death while visiting his family in Athens, Greece, the IRT sets out to apprehend a xenophobic proxy killer who forces his victims to fight each other to the death in a brutal ancient Greek combat sport. Meanwhile, Garrett contemplates telling Karen about Ryan's undercover operation.
22	9	"Blowback"	Nina Lopez-Corrado	Christopher Barbour	April 26, 2017	209	4.56
After the investigation of a double homicide in the fictional country of Kurjikistan is interrupted by a gunfight that claims the prime suspect's life, the IRT faces a tense interrogation from FBI Assistant Director Linda Barnes (Kim Rhodes).
23	10	"Type A"	Christoph Schrewe	Tim Clemente	May 3, 2017	210	5.00
When two Taipei, Taiwan women are poisoned and found posed outside office buildings with knives in their hearts and purple orchids in their laps, SSA Emily Prentiss (Paget Brewster) informs the IRT the case may be connected to the unsolved murders of four Brooklyn, New York women from 16 years earlier. The investigation becomes personal for Clara, as one of the Brooklyn victims was a colleague who worked with her and Prentiss.
24	11	"Obey"	Constantine Makris	Daniele Nathanson	May 10, 2017	211	4.85
When a Philadelphia, Pennsylvania hip-hop singer is stabbed to death and exsanguinated while recording an album in Kingston, Jamaica and his cousin is labeled the prime suspect due to his past run-ins with the law, the IRT attempts to determine whether or not he is innocent and identify the motive behind the murder. Meanwhile, Garrett grows anxious about not receiving updates on Ryan's mission in Mexico.
25	12	"Abominable"	Jennifer Lynch	Matthew Lau	May 17, 2017	212	4.87
When an Illinois woman is brutally murdered while on a yoga retreat in Nepal, the IRT works with local authorities to determine whether or not the crime was committed by the mythological Yeti.
26	13	"The Ripper of Riga"	Mikael Salomon	Adam Glass	May 17, 2017	213	4.16
When a teenage Houston, Texas ballerina is abducted in Saint Petersburg, Russia, the IRT suspects some of her co-stars in the upcoming ballet recital are behind her disappearance until the investigation leads Garrett to believe the kidnapper is an accomplice of an ex-KGB agent whom he put in jail years prior. Meanwhile, the stakes are raised when Ryan faces a life-threatening situation, forcing Garrett to make a decision that could potentially jeopardize the team's reputation.

== Ratings ==
Viewership and ratings per episode of Criminal Minds: Beyond Borders season 2
No.	Title	Air date	Rating/share (18–49)	Viewers (millions)	DVR viewers (millions)	Total viewers (millions)
1	"Lost Souls"	March 8, 2017	0.9/3	5.35	2.52	7.90
2	"Il Mostro"	March 15, 2017	0.9/3	5.37	2.37	7.75
3	"The Devil's Breath"	March 22, 2017	0.8/3	4.78	2.26	7.04
4	"Pretty Like Me"	March 29, 2017	0.9/3	4.97	2.21	7.19
5	"Made In..."	April 5, 2017	0.7/3	4.61	TBD	TBD
6	"Cinderella and the Dragon"	April 12, 2017	0.9/3	5.74	1.88	6.81
7	"La Huesuda"	April 12, 2017	0.8/3	4.72	1.88	6.81
8	"Pankration"	April 19, 2017	0.8/3	4.74	2.11	6.86
9	"Blowback"	April 26, 2017	0.8/3	4.56	TBD	TBD
10	"Type A"	May 3, 2017	0.9/4	5.00	TBD	TBD
11	"Obey"	May 10, 2017	0.8/3	4.85	2.03	6.87
12	"Abominable"	May 17, 2017	0.7/3	4.87	2.02	6.18
13	"The Ripper of Riga"	May 17, 2017	0.7/3	4.16	2.02	6.18
