= Criminal Minds: Beyond Borders season 1 =

Season of television series Criminal Minds: Beyond Borders

Criminal Minds: Beyond Borders
- Season 1
- DVD cover
- Starring: Gary Sinise; Alana de la Garza; Daniel Henney; Tyler James Williams; Annie Funke
- No. of episodes: 13

Release
- Original network: CBS
- Original release: March 16 – May 25, 2016

Season chronology
- Next → Season 2

The first season of Criminal Minds: Beyond Borders premiered on CBS on March 16, 2016, and ended May 25, 2016. The season consisted of 13 episodes.

== Cast ==
=== Main ===
- Gary Sinise as Jack Garrett
- Alana de la Garza as Clara Seger
- Daniel Henney as Matthew "Matt" Simmons
- Tyler James Williams as Russ "Monty" Montgomery
- Annie Funke as Mae Jarvis

=== Recurring ===
- Kelly Frye as Kristy Simmons
- Ezra Dewey as Jake Simmons
- Declan Whaley as David Simmons
- Brittany Uomoleale as Josie Garrett
- Sherry Stringfield as Karen Garrett

== Production ==
A proposed new series in the Criminal Minds franchise was announced in January 2015, and was to be named Criminal Minds: Beyond Borders. Gary Sinise and Anna Gunn had been cast in the lead roles of Jack Garrett and Lily Lambert, with Tyler James Williams and Daniel Henney being cast as Russ "Monty" Montgomery and Matthew "Matt" Simmons, respectively.

On May 8, 2015, CBS announced that Criminal Minds: Beyond Borders, has been picked up for the 2015–16 season, however, it was soon announced that Gunn had departed the series, with Alana de la Garza and Annie Funke further being cast as series regulars. The season was originally intended to premiere on March 2, 2016, but was pushed back by two weeks and instead premiered on March 16, 2016, and filled the Wednesday 10:00pm time slot, airing immediately after the original Criminal Minds. The episodes, while produced in a certain order, are not aired in that way.

== Episodes ==
No. overall	No. in season	Title	Directed by	Written by	Original release date	Prod. code	US viewers (millions)
1	1	"The Harmful One"	Colin Bucksey	Erica Messer	March 8, 2011	101	8.88
When three American people disappear while volunteering at a Thailand root farm, the IRT works with former colleague Clara Seger and the Royal Thai Police to track down the kidnapper before a devastating storm washes away the evidence.
2	2	"Harvested"	Rob Bailey	Erica Meredith	March 15, 2011	104	7.78
When an American college student attending a music festival in Mumbai, India is hospitalized after waking up with one of his kidneys removed and his best friend is reported missing, the IRT suspects the killer is doing more with his victims' organs than just selling them on the black market.
3	3	"Denial"	Rod Holcomb	Adam Glass	March 22, 2011	107	7.07
When a U.S. Army veteran living in Cairo, Egypt is killed after getting ambushed in his car with a gas grenade and his friend is reported missing, the IRT juggles connecting the case to a recent suicide and determining whether or not the missing friend is innocent.
4	4	"Whispering Death"	Larry Teng	Adam Glass	March 29, 2011	110	7.44
When three American people in Tokyo, Japan are found dead from apparent suicides over the course of a week, the IRT works with local authorities to track down a serial killer with self-esteem problems. Meanwhile, Mae tries to encourage Clara to spend more time outside of work and enjoy herself.
5	5	"The Lonely Heart"	Constantine Makris	Ticona S. Joy	April 5, 2011	108	6.98
When two American women living in Paris, France are strangled to death in their homes, with the first victim found with timber scribes in her eye sockets and the second found decapitated, the IRT sets out to profile a killer attempting to send a message to his love interest.
6	6	"Love Interrupted"	Paul A. Kaufman	Adam Glass	April 12, 2011	102	7.91
When an American newlywed couple disappears while on their honeymoon in San Pedro, Belize, the IRT attempts to track down a delusional killer who believes he is an ancient Aztec warrior.
7	7	"Citizens of the World"	Alec Smight	Matthew Lau	April 19, 2011	106	7.55
When an elderly Coeur d'Alene, Idaho couple is abducted while visiting Casablanca, Morocco on a cruise and held for a $400,000 ransom, the IRT finds themselves in a race against time to profile the kidnappers and prevent the hostages from meeting a violent end.
8	8	"De Los Inocentes"	Jeannot Szwarc	Christopher Barbour	April 26, 2011	103	6.58
When a Fort Worth, Texas woman is abducted and murdered while vacationing with her family in Mexico and her husband is labeled the prime suspect, the IRT juggles determining whether or not he is innocent and the reason for his wife's death.
9	9	"The Matchmaker"	Matt Earl Beesley	Tim Clemente	May 3, 2011	109	6.82
When an American teenage girl is abducted while attempting to meet her boyfriend in Antalya, Turkey, the IRT uncovers a chain of evidence that leads them to an Iraqi terrorist organization headquartered in Istanbul.
10	10	"Iqiniso"	Laura Belsey	Christopher Barbour	May 10, 2011	111	6.05
When a Roswell, Georgia college student is found mutilated while working at his aunt's Johannesburg, South Africa bar and his older brother is reported missing, the IRT connects the crimes to a Pretoria woman's murder from a month earlier and sets out to determine whether or not a gang is responsible. Meanwhile, Garrett works the case with an old acquaintance who has an unorthodox style of investigation.
11	11	"The Ballad of Nick and Nat"	Jeremiah Chechik	Daniele Nathanson	May 17, 2011	105	5.94
When a Miami, Florida chef is found gunned down outside Camajuaní, Cuba, the IRT sets out to identify a pair of escalating spree killers recreating Che Guevara's liberation of the island.
12	12	"El Toro Bravo"	Tawnia McKiernan	Erica Meredith	May 24, 2011	112	5.74
When a Seattle, Washington lawyer goes missing in Pamplona, Spain while participating in the city's annual running of the bulls festival and his ears are subsequently found in a plaza across town, the IRT connects his disappearance to the unsolved murders of three Australian men from the previous festival and suspects the crimes are politically motivated.
13	13	"Paper Orphans"	Félix Enríquez Alcalá	Erica Messer	May 31, 2011	113	5.19
When an American four-year-old girl is abducted while visiting Port-au-Prince, Haiti with her family to adopt a child, the IRT rushes to track down a kidnapper who suffered a series of devastating losses. Meanwhile, Garrett and his wife, Karen (Sherry Stringfield), prepare to send their daughter, Josie, off to college with a big celebration.

== Ratings ==
=== Live + SD ratings ===
No. in series	No. in season	Episode	Air date	Time slot (EST)	Rating/Share (18–49)	Viewers (m)	18–49 Rank	Viewership rank	Drama rank
1	1	"The Harmful One"	March 16, 2016	Wednesdays; 10:00 P.M.	1.6/6	8.88	25	13	8
2	2	"Harvested"	March 23, 2016	Wednesdays; 10:00 P.M.	1.5/5	7.78	26	16	9
3	3	"Denial"	March 30, 2016	Wednesdays; 10:00 P.M.	1.3/5	7.07	25	23	14
4	4	"Whispering Death"	April 6, 2016	Wednesday; 9:00 P.M.	1.2/4	7.44	—N/a	18	10
5	5	"The Lonely Heart"	April 6, 2016	Wednesdays; 10:00 P.M.	1.2/4	6.98	—N/a	24	13
6	6	"Love Interrupted"	April 13, 2016	Wednesdays; 10:00 P.M.	1.5/5	7.91	18	21	14
7	7	"Citizens of the World"	April 20, 2016	Wednesdays; 10:00 P.M.	1.3/4	7.55	20	22	15
8	8	"De Los Inocentes"	April 27, 2016	Wednesdays; 10:00 P.M.	1.2/4	6.58	—N/a	—N/a	—N/a
9	9	"The Matchmaker"	May 4, 2016	Wednesdays; 10:00 P.M.	1.2/4	6.82	—N/a	—N/a	—N/a
10	10	"Iqiniso"	May 11, 2016	Wednesday; 9:00 P.M.	1.1/4	6.05	—N/a	—N/a	—N/a
11	11	"The Ballad of Nick and Nat"	May 11, 2016	Wednesday; 10:00 P.M.	1.1/4	5.94	—N/a	—N/a	—N/a
12	12	"El Toro Bravo"	May 25, 2016	Wednesday; 9:00 P.M.	1.0/4	5.74	20	16	6
13	13	"Paper Orphans"	May 25, 2016	Wednesday; 10:00 P.M.	1.0/4	5.19	25	21	11

=== Live + 7 Day (DVR) ratings ===
No. in series	No. in season	Episode	Air date	Time slot (EST)	18–49 rating increase	Viewers (millions) increase	Total 18–49	Total viewers (millions)	Ref
1	1	"The Harmful One"	March 16, 2016	Wednesdays; 10:00 p.m.	0.8	3.16	2.4	12.04	
2	2	"Harvested"	March 23, 2016	Wednesdays; 10:00 p.m.	0.8	3.03	2.2	10.81	
3	3	"Denial"	March 30, 2016	Wednesdays; 10:00 p.m.	—N/a	2.62	—N/a	9.70	
4	4	"Whispering Death"	April 6, 2016	Wednesday; 9:00 p.m.	—N/a	2.19	—N/a	9.63	
5	5	"The Lonely Heart"	April 6, 2016	Wednesdays; 10:00 p.m.	—N/a	2.19	—N/a	9.17	
6	6	"Love Interrupted"	April 13, 2016	Wednesdays; 10:00 p.m.	—N/a	2.23	—N/a	10.15	
7	7	"Citizens of the World"	April 20, 2016	Wednesdays; 10:00 p.m.	—N/a	2.11	—N/a	9.66	
8	8	"De Los Inocentes"	April 27, 2016	Wednesdays; 10:00 p.m.	—N/a	2.25	—N/a	8.83	
9	9	"The Matchmaker"	May 4, 2016	Wednesdays; 10:00 p.m.	—N/a	—N/a	—N/a	—N/a	
10	10	"Iqiniso"	May 11, 2016	Wednesday; 9:00 p.m.	—N/a	2.17	—N/a	8.22	
11	11	"The Ballad of Nick and Nat"	May 11, 2016	Wednesday; 10:00 p.m.	—N/a	2.17	—N/a	8.11	
12	12	"El Toro Bravo"	May 25, 2016	Wednesday; 9:00 p.m.	0.6	2.00	1.6	7.74	
13	13	"Paper Orphans"	May 25, 2016	Wednesday; 10:00 p.m.	0.5	2.19	1.5	7.38	

== Home media ==
The Complete First Season
Set details		Special features
13 episodes; 4-disc set; Aspect Ratio: 1.78:1; Subtitles: English; English: Dolby Digital 5.1		Beyond Borders: Departures; Beyond Borders: Destinations; Beyond Borders: The IRT; Gag Reel; Deleted and Extended Scenes; Backdoor-pilot from Criminal Minds Season 10: "Beyond Borders"
DVD release date
Region 1	Region 2	Region 4
September 20, 2016	—N/a	—N/a
