= Criminal Mind =

Criminal Mind may refer to:

- Criminology, and the concepts of mens rea, offender profiling, and forensic psychology
- "Criminal Mind" (song), a 2012 song by Lukas Graham
- Criminal Mind (album), a 1994 album by Gone
- "Criminal Mind", a song on the album The Crack by The Ruts
- Criminal Mind, an album by the band Gone
- "Criminal Mind", a song on the album Blue Streak
- "Criminal Mind", a song on the album The Boyfriend by Danny Wilde
- "A Criminal Mind", a song by Lawrence Gowan
- "A Criminal Mind", an episode of the television show Snoops
- "The Criminal Mind", an episode of the television show Lockup

== See also ==
- Criminal Minds, an American crime drama television show
- Criminal Minds (disambiguation)
