= List of Criminal Minds: Beyond Borders characters =

This is a list of characters in the television series Criminal Minds: Beyond Borders, an American police procedural drama that premiered March 16, 2016, on CBS in the United States.

The FBI's International Response Team. From left to right: Senior SSA Clara Seger, SSA Jack Garrett, SSA Russ "Monty" Montgomery, ME and SSA Mae Jarvis and SSA Matthew "Matt" Simmons.

== Main characters ==
Character	Actor	Position	Seasons	
Character	Actor	Position	1	2
Jack Garrett	Gary Sinise	Unit Chief / Senior Supervisory Special Agent	Main	Main
Clara Seger	Alana de la Garza	Linguistics Specialist / Senior Supervisory Special Agent	Main	Main
Matthew "Matt" Simmons	Daniel Henney	Special Operations Agent / Supervisory Special Agent	Main	Main
Russ "Monty" Montgomery	Tyler James Williams	Technical Analyst	Main	Main
Mae Jarvis	Annie Funke	Medical Examiner / Supervisory Special Agent	Main	Main

=== Jack Garrett ===
Played by Gary Sinise, Unit Chief SSA Jack Garrett is a 20-year veteran agent with the FBI. Jack is the Unit Chief of the International Response Team (IRT), which specializes in solving cases that involve American citizens on international soil. Through his job, he shares personal history with Aaron Hotchner and David Rossi of the FBI's Behavioral Analysis Unit and Clara Seger from his own team. In his personal life, Garrett is married to his wife Karen (Sherry Stringfield) and together they have six children, Ryan, Jack Jr, Josie, R.J., Millie and Emma. His son Ryan recently got into the FBI Academy which concerned him, as Ryan would therefore be putting himself in harm's way as an agent. His daughter Josie recently went away to college. Garrett takes his job seriously and hopes to make the world a safer place for his family to live in.

=== Clara Seger ===
Alana de la Garza as Clara Seger

Played by Alana de la Garza, SSA Clara Seger is a smart, well-traveled and multi-lingual cultural anthropologist and special agent with the IRT. Before rejoining the IRT in 2016, Seger was married to a man named Brad who was a fellow agent and, like her, knew Jack. In 2013, she took a sabbatical from the FBI after her husband Brad died from unknown causes, which Clara struggled to cope with. She later, reluctantly, returned to the IRT in 2016.

The character did not appear in the series' backdoor pilot (Criminal Minds' "Beyond Borders"), but instead replaced Anna Gunn's "law expert and linguist Lily Lambert" in the first episode (March 16, 2016). When de la Garza spoke to Yahoo! in March 2016, she raved about the ease and comfortableness of the character's wardrobe: flat-heeled shoes, cargo pants, and loose-fitting t-shirts.

Seger is a cultural anthropologist, returning to the Federal Bureau of Investigation's International Response Team in the first season after taking a two-year sabbatical following the death of her co-worker and husband. She speaks 13 languages fluently, including French and Thai, a feat that complicated de la Garza's performances: "That was tricky for me, to kind of swallow it and make it sound authentic. […] In Thai, there was a line I had to say that I kept saying like a question but it was actually a statement. I was like, 'This feels awkward.' It's like retraining your brain."

=== Matt Simmons ===
Played by Daniel Henney, SSA Matthew "Matt" Simmons is a Special Operations agent and special agent with the IRT. Simmons is married to his wife Kristy (Kelly Frye) and has a total of four young children, including sons Jake and David and twin daughters. Like Garrett, Simmons' full and fulfilling family life was a deliberate choice. Through his job, Simmons has some prior history with Derek Morgan and JJ of the FBI's Behavioral Analysis Unit. He was a former member of a Special Ops unit, and his experience with the unit allowed him to hone his profiling skills.

=== Russ Montgomery ===
Played by Tyler James Williams, Russ "Monty" Montgomery is a technical analyst with the IRT. Monty has some prior history and friendship with Penelope Garcia, the tech analyst of the FBI's Behavioral Analysis Unit. Much like Garcia, he upholds a positive attitude, though he shows it in a different way. In addition to his job as a technical analyst, he liaises with the families of victims on the American homeland while the rest of his group is away.

=== Mae Jarvis ===
Played by Annie Funke, Mae Jarvis is a medical examiner and special agent with the FBI's International Response Team (IRT). Young and spunky, Mae has a fun-loving big bro-little sis relationship with Simmons and was in the FBI purely as a medical examiner before being brought onto the IRT as a resident medical examiner to bypass the bureaucratic red tape in various countries. Jarvis was briefly engaged to a man but later called off the wedding due to her devotion to her job with the IRT.

== Recurring ==
=== Karen Garrett ===
Played by Sherry Stringfield, Karen Garrett is married to Jack Garrett and the mother of their five children.

=== Josie Garrett ===
Played by Brittany Uomoleale, Josie Garrett is the middle daughter of Jack and Karen Garrett's five children.

=== Kristy Simmons ===
Played by Kelly Frye, Kristy Simmons is married to Matthew Simmons and the mother of their four children.

=== Jake Simmons ===
Played by Ezra Dewey, Jake Simmons is the son of Matthew and Kristy Simmons and David's twin brother.

=== David Simmons ===
Played by Declan Whaley, David Simmons is the son of Matthew and Kristy Simmons and Jakes's twin brother.

=== Ryan Garrett ===
Played by Matt Cohen, Ryan Garrett is Jack's and Karen's oldest son who is currently training at the FBI Academy and following in his father's footsteps.

== Characters from Criminal Minds ==
- David Rossi – portrayed by Joe Mantegna
  Rossi appeared in the first episode of season one "The Harmful One". In the opening scene of the episode, Rossi is at the FBI firing range with Jack Garrett. He later reappeared in the season two episode "Il Mostro", in which he aided the IRT while they were on a case in Florence, Italy.
- Penelope Garcia – portrayed by Kirsten Vangsness
  Garcia appeared in the third episode of season one "Denial". In the opening scene of the episode, Garcia is looking for her octopus coffee mug that Russ Montgomery took. She later returned in the season two premiere "Lost Souls", in which she helped Monty track down victims' families while the IRT were investigating a mass abduction in Tanzania.
- Emily Prentiss – portrayed by Paget Brewster
  Prentiss appeared in the season two episode "Type A", in which she aided the IRT track down an unsub active in New York City and Taiwan.
- Mateo "Matt" Cruz – portrayed by Esai Morales
  Cruz appeared in the season two episode "La Huesuda", in which he called Jack regarding information about his son, Ryan.
