= Adam Glass =

American film producer

Adam Glass is an American comic book writer, screenwriter and television producer best known for his work on the TV series Supernatural, Cold Case and Criminal Minds. As a comic writer, he wrote such titles as Deadpool and Luke Cage for Marvel Comics, and wrote "The New 52" phase of Suicide Squad in DC Comics. His work Rough Riders was published in 2016 by AfterShock.

== Filmography ==
- All About the Andersons co-creator (2003–2004)
- Monster Island co-writer (2004)
- Blue Collar TV writer and supervising producer (2004–2005)
- The Cleaner writer and consulting producer (2008–2009)
- Cold Case writer and producer (2009–2010)
- Supernatural writer and executive producer (2010–2015)
- Criminal Minds: Beyond Borders writer and executive producer (2016–2017)
- In From the Cold writer and executive producer (2022)
- The Equalizer writer and executive producer (2023)

== Bibliography ==
Marvel

- Luke Cage Noir #2-4 (2009)
- Deadpool: Suicide Kings #3-5 (2009)
- Deadpool Pulp #2-4 (2010)
- Deadpool Team-Up #897 (2010)
- Deadpool #1000 (2010)

DC Comics

- Flashpoint: Legion of Doom #1-3 (2011)
- JLA 80-Page Giant 2011 #1 (2011)
- Suicide Squad #1-19 (2011–2013)
- The Joker: Death of the Family (2013)

AfterShock Comics

- Rough Riders (2016)
- Mary Shelley Monster Hunter (2018)
- Bram Stoker Monster Hunter (2024)
