= Criminal Minds season 10 =

Season of television series Criminal Minds

Criminal Minds
- Season 10
- Season 10 U.S. DVD cover
- Starring: Joe Mantegna; Shemar Moore; Matthew Gray Gubler; A. J. Cook; Kirsten Vangsness; Jennifer Love Hewitt; Thomas Gibson
- No. of episodes: 23

Release
- Original network: CBS
- Original release: October 1, 2014 – May 6, 2015

Season chronology
- ← Previous; Season 9 Next → Season 11

The tenth season of Criminal Minds premiered on CBS on October 1, 2014. The series was officially renewed for a tenth season on March 13, 2014. It consists of 23 episodes. This season features Jennifer Love Hewitt playing an undercover agent who joins the BAU. Episode 19 was a pilot episode for the spin-off series Criminal Minds: Beyond Borders.

== Cast ==
The entire main cast returned for the season, except Jeanne Tripplehorn (Alex Blake), who left the show in the season nine finale. On July 1, 2014, it was announced that Jennifer Love Hewitt would join the show as a series regular, playing Kate Callahan, a former undercover FBI agent whose exceptional work lands her a job with the Behavioral Analysis Unit.

=== Main ===
- Joe Mantegna as Supervisory Special Agent David Rossi (BAU Senior Agent)
- Shemar Moore as Supervisory Special Agent Derek Morgan (BAU Agent)
- Matthew Gray Gubler as Supervisory Special Agent Dr. Spencer Reid (BAU Agent)
- A. J. Cook as Supervisory Special Agent Jennifer "JJ" Jareau (BAU Agent)
- Kirsten Vangsness as Special Agent Penelope Garcia (BAU Technical Analyst & Co-Communications Liaison)
- Jennifer Love Hewitt as Supervisory Special Agent Kate Callahan (BAU Agent)
- Thomas Gibson as Supervisory Special Agent Aaron "Hotch" Hotchner (BAU Unit Chief & Co-Communications Liaison)

=== Special guest star ===
- Gary Sinise as FBI Supervisory Special Agent Jack Garrett (IRT Unit Chief)
- Anna Gunn as FBI Special Agent Lily Lambert
- Daniel Henney as Supervisory Special Agent Matthew "Matt" Simmons (BAU Agent)
- Tyler James Williams as Russ "Monty" Montgomery
- Edward Asner as Roy Brooks

=== Recurring ===
- Hailey Sole as Meg Callahan
- Taylor Mosby as Markayla Davis
- Rochelle Aytes as Savannah Hayes
- Greg Grunberg as Chris Callahan
- Cade Owens as Jack Hotchner
- Amber Stevens as Joy Struthers
- Mekhai Andersen as Henry LaMontagne
- Nicholas Brendon as Kevin Lynch
- Bodhi Elfman as Peter Lewis / Mr. Scratch
- Esai Morales as Supervisory Special Agent Mateo "Matt" Cruz (BAU Section Chief)

== Episodes ==
| No. overall | No. in season | Title | Directed by | Written by | Original release date | Prod. code | U.S. viewers (millions) |
|---|---|---|---|---|---|---|---|
| 211 | 1 | "X" | Glenn Kershaw | Erica Messer | October 1, 2014 | 1001 | 11.74 |
When three dismembered torsos are found in the desert outside Bakersfield, California, the BAU attempts to track down a serial killer with connections to a human trafficking ring. Meanwhile, with Blake relocating to Boston, Massachusetts, the team welcomes their newest member, undercover agent Kate Callahan (Jennifer Love Hewitt), into the fold.
| 212 | 2 | "Burn" | Karen Gaviola | Janine Sherman Barrois | October 8, 2014 | 1002 | 10.57 |
When three Seattle, Washington men are found dead with Roman numerals carved on their tongues, the BAU sets out to catch a killer attempting to avenge an abusive childhood by basing his crimes on the Nine Circles of Hell from Dante's Inferno. Meanwhile, Garcia travels to Sierra Blanca, Texas to confront sheriff's deputy-turned-serial killer Greg Baylor, who attempted to kill her and Reid earlier in the year, before his execution.
| 213 | 3 | "A Thousand Suns" | Rob Bailey | Sharon Lee Watson | October 15, 2014 | 1003 | 10.89 |
When a passenger jet transporting 152 people from Pittsburgh, Pennsylvania to Phoenix, Arizona crash lands in a field outside Durango, Colorado and kills everyone on board except the co-pilot, the BAU juggles interviewing the only survivor and profiling a homegrown terrorist before he strikes again. Meanwhile, Kate confronts her feelings about a family tragedy that continues to resonate with her.
| 214 | 4 | "The Itch" | Larry Teng | Breen Frazier | October 22, 2014 | 1004 | 9.92 |
When an Atlanta, Georgia journalist is killed after getting hit by a car and scratches are found all over his body, the BAU sets out to identify a delusional abductor suffering from an obsessive skin disorder.
| 215 | 5 | "Boxed In" | Thomas Gibson | Virgil Williams | October 29, 2014 | 1006 | 10.48 |
When a missing 12-year-old San Diego, California boy is found alive in a pumpkin patch on the day before the anniversary of his disappearance, the BAU connects the case to a missing 10-year-old Los Angeles boy who died hours after he was found the previous year and finds themselves competing in a race against the clock to profile an abductor recreating his troubled childhood. Meanwhile, Hotch juggles working the case and regretting his inability to be with Jack for Halloween.
| 216 | 6 | "If the Shoe Fits" | Bethany Rooney | Bruce Zimmerman | November 5, 2014 | 1005 | 9.78 |
When two male Missoula, Montana college students are found stabbed to death with their cell phones in their mouths, the BAU sets out to track down a female serial killer obsessed with the story of Cinderella. Meanwhile, JJ struggles to confront her suppressed feelings about her older sister, Roslyn's, suicide from over 20 years earlier.
| 217 | 7 | "Hashtag" | Constantine Makris | Rick Dunkle | November 12, 2014 | 1007 | 10.35 |
When a teenage Bethesda, Maryland girl is stabbed to death in her home and a photo of her body is posted on her social media pages, the BAU attempts to profile a serial killer targeting online celebrities while taking on the persona of an Internet urban legend. Meanwhile, Morgan and Savannah struggle to find quality time for each other with their jobs.
| 218 | 8 | "The Boys of Sudworth Place" | Laura Belsey | Kimberly Ann Harrison | November 19, 2014 | 1008 | 10.68 |
When a Boston, Massachusetts defense attorney is abducted from a convenience store parking lot, the BAU uncovers a dark truth behind the reason for his disappearance. Meanwhile, Morgan becomes personally involved in the case when he recalls some traumatic childhood memories.
| 219 | 9 | "Fate" | Rob Bailey | Janine Sherman Barrois | November 26, 2014 | 1009 | 11.00 |
When three Reston, Virginia residents are stabbed to death, the BAU searches for a female killer whose uncontrollable desire to kill is matched by extreme remorse for her actions. Meanwhile, Rossi meets a young woman (Amber Stevens) who is more than she appears to be.
| 220 | 10 | "Amelia Porter" | Alrick Riley | Sharon Lee Watson | December 10, 2014 | 1010 | 10.12 |
When a security guard is stabbed to death in a Salt Lake City, Utah office building and a couple is gunned down in their home across town on the same night, the BAU suspects the killer is attempting to reunite with a fugitive from his past. Meanwhile, Rossi attempts to set up a date for Hotch after the latter breaks up with Beth.
| 221 | 11 | "The Forever People" | Tawnia McKiernan | Breen Frazier | January 14, 2015 | 1011 | 10.31 |
When a Kingman, Arizona woman is frozen to death and subsequently found floating in Lake Mead, the BAU centers their investigation on a Boulder City, Nevada cult. Meanwhile, JJ faces emotional turmoil as the anniversary of her abduction approaches.
| 222 | 12 | "Anonymous" | Joe Mantegna | Teleplay by : Bruce Zimmerman; Story by : Danny Ramm & Bruce Zimmerman | January 21, 2015 | 1012 | 10.29 |
When three Tallahassee, Florida residents are gunned down, the BAU sets out to profile a killer who reports his crimes mere minutes before he even commits them. Meanwhile, Rossi postpones a planned vacation after receiving news of a close friend's passing.
| 223 | 13 | "Nelson's Sparrow" | Glenn Kershaw | Kirsten Vangsness & Erica Messer | January 28, 2015 | 1013 | 10.70 |
When veteran profiler Jason Gideon is found gunned down in his cabin, the BAU reopens a 37-year-old cold case centered on an elusive Roanoke, Virginia serial killer wanted for the abductions and murders of three women, the first case Rossi and Gideon ever worked together. Meanwhile, each individual agent struggles to come to terms with Gideon's death.
| 224 | 14 | "Hero Worship" | Larry Teng | Rick Dunkle | February 4, 2015 | 1014 | 10.48 |
When a bombing at an Indianapolis, Indiana coffee shop claims the lives of six people and one of the 16 survivors is hailed a hero, the BAU juggles protecting him and his family, connecting the crime to an elementary school bombing that killed a janitor the previous week, and preventing another attack from taking place. Meanwhile, Reid continues to struggle with mourning Gideon's death.
| 225 | 15 | "Scream" | Hanelle Culpepper | Kimberly Ann Harrison | February 11, 2015 | 1015 | 9.89 |
When two Diamond Bar, California women are abducted, tortured, and brutally beaten to death, the BAU sets out to catch a killer obsessed with his victims' reactions to their suffering. Meanwhile, Kate becomes concerned when her teenage niece, Meg, makes a date with a boy she met online.
| 226 | 16 | "Lockdown" | Thomas Gibson | Virgil Williams | March 4, 2015 | 1016 | 10.37 |
When two guards at a Liberty, Texas prison are found stabbed to death with socks stuffed in their mouths over the course of three months, the BAU suspects some of the inmates and guards are in cahoots.
| 227 | 17 | "Breath Play" | Hanelle Culpepper | Erik Stiller | March 11, 2015 | 1017 | 10.32 |
When three Madison, Wisconsin women are raped and strangled to death in their homes, the BAU sets out to profile a serial killer obsessed with an erotic romance novel. Meanwhile, Kate juggles dealing with Meg's bad behavior and making a surprise announcement.
| 228 | 18 | "Rock Creek Park" | Félix Alcalá | Sharon Lee Watson | March 25, 2015 | 1018 | 10.08 |
When a Congressman's wife is abducted by Russian mobsters demanding a $20 million ransom, the BAU works with the Organized Crime Unit to profile the kidnappers and prevent them from taking an innocent life.
| 229 | 19 | "Beyond Borders" | Glenn Kershaw | Erica Messer | April 8, 2015 | 1019 | 10.39 |
When a Fairfax County, Virginia family of four is abducted while vacationing in Barbados, the BAU works with SSA Jack Garrett (Gary Sinise) and the International Response Team, a unit that specializes in cases involving American people outside the United States, to connect the crime to the unsolved murders of two other families in Aruba and Florida, respectively, and track down a family annihilator who forces his victims to reenact moments from his abusive childhood. This episode serves as the backdoor-pilot episode for Criminal Minds: Beyond Borders.
| 230 | 20 | "A Place at the Table" | Laura Belsey | Bruce Zimmerman | April 15, 2015 | 1020 | 10.37 |
When four members of a Bethesda, Maryland family of six are found murdered at their dining room table and the father and his oldest son are reported missing, the BAU delves into each family member's past to determine the killer's identity. Meanwhile, Hotch tries to reconnect with his belligerent ex-father-in-law, Roy (Ed Asner), and help him come to terms with Haley's death.
| 231 | 21 | "Mr. Scratch" | Matthew Gray Gubler | Breen Frazier | April 22, 2015 | 1021 | 10.06 |
When three murder suspects in three different states claim a "shadow monster" killed their loved ones, the BAU sets out to catch a proxy killer (Bodhi Elfman) who manipulates his victims by drugging them. However, the stakes are raised when Hotch finds himself in a life-threatening situation.
| 232 | 22 | "Protection" | Tawnia McKiernan | Virgil Williams | April 29, 2015 | 1022 | 8.72 |
When three people in Los Angeles, California are gunned down, the BAU suspects the crimes were committed by a mission-oriented vigilante targeting anyone he deems guilty of a criminal offense.
| 233 | 23 | "The Hunt" | Glenn Kershaw | Jim Clemente & Janine Sherman Barrois | May 6, 2015 | 1023 | 9.61 |
When Meg and her best friend, Markayla, are abducted while preparing to meet who they think is a teenage boy, the BAU uncovers evidence of an online human trafficking ring that caters to serial killers and juggles profiling the ring's leader and tracking down the missing girls.

== Ratings ==
=== Live + SD ratings ===
| No. in series | No. in season | Episode | Air date | Time slot (EST) | Rating/Share (18–49) | Viewers (m) | 18–49 Rank | Viewership rank | Drama rank |
|---|---|---|---|---|---|---|---|---|---|
| 211 | 1 | "X" | October 1, 2014 | Wednesday; 9:00 P.M. | 2.7/8 | 11.74 | 15 | 14 | 6 |
| 212 | 2 | "Burn" | October 8, 2014 | Wednesday; 9:00 P.M. | 2.3/7 | 10.57 | 22 | 15 | 10 |
| 213 | 3 | "A Thousand Suns" | October 15, 2014 | Wednesday; 9:00 P.M. | 2.4/7 | 10.89 | 21 | 16 | 7 |
| 214 | 4 | "The Itch" | October 22, 2014 | Wednesday; 9:00 P.M. | 2.5/7 | 9.92 | 15 | 22 | 3 |
| 215 | 5 | "Boxed In" | October 29, 2014 | Wednesday; 9:00 P.M. | 2.3/7 | 10.48 | 20 | 14 | 7 |
| 216 | 6 | "If the Shoe Fits" | November 5, 2014 | Wednesday; 9:00 P.M. | 2.1/6 | 9.78 | 21 | 17 | 8 |
| 217 | 7 | "Hashtag" | November 12, 2014 | Wednesday; 9:00 P.M. | 2.3/7 | 10.35 | 21 | 15 | 8 |
| 218 | 8 | "The Boys of Sudworth Place" | November 19, 2014 | Wednesday; 9:00 P.M. | 2.3/7 | 10.68 | 20 | 14 | 7 |
| 219 | 9 | "Fate" | November 26, 2014 | Wednesday; 9:00 P.M. | 2.2/7 | 11.00 | 13 | 11 | 4 |
| 220 | 10 | "Amelia Porter" | December 10, 2014 | Wednesday; 9:00 P.M. | 2.1/7 | 10.12 | 16 | 12 | 3 |
| 221 | 11 | "The Forever People" | January 14, 2015 | Wednesday; 9:00 P.M. | 2.2/6 | 10.31 | 12 | 12 | 3 |
| 222 | 12 | "Anonymous" | January 21, 2015 | Wednesday; 9:00 P.M. | 2.0/6 | 10.29 | 12 | 8 | 4 |
| 223 | 13 | "Nelson's Sparrow" | January 28, 2015 | Wednesday; 9:00 P.M. | 2.1/6 | 10.70 | 15 | 12 | 6 |
| 224 | 14 | "Hero Worship" | February 4, 2015 | Wednesday; 9:00 P.M. | 2.0/6 | 10.48 | 22 | 9 | 8 |
| 225 | 15 | "Scream" | February 11, 2015 | Wednesday; 9:00 P.M. | 1.9/6 | 9.89 | 22 | 19 | 9 |
| 226 | 16 | "Lockdown" | March 4, 2015 | Wednesday; 9:00 P.M. | 1.9/6 | 10.37 | 25 | 12 | 8 |
| 227 | 17 | "Breath Play" | March 11, 2015 | Wednesday; 9:00 P.M. | 2.1/7 | 10.32 | 14 | 12 | 4 |
| 228 | 18 | "Rock Creek Park" | March 25, 2015 | Wednesday; 9:00 P.M. | 2.1/6 | 10.08 | 11 | 8 | 4 |
| 229 | 19 | "Beyond Borders" | April 8, 2015 | Wednesday; 9:00 P.M. | 2.1/7 | 10.39 | 9 | 10 | 2 |
| 230 | 20 | "A Place at the Table" | April 15, 2015 | Wednesday; 9:00 P.M. | 2.1/7 | 10.37 | 10 | 8 | 2 |
| 231 | 21 | "Mr. Scratch" | April 22, 2015 | Wednesday; 9:00 P.M. | 2.0/6 | 10.06 | 14 | 11 | 3 |
| 232 | 22 | "Protection" | April 29, 2015 | Wednesday; 9:00 P.M. | 1.8/6 | 8.72 | 18 | 15 | 7 |
| 233 | 23 | "The Hunt" | May 6, 2015 | Wednesday; 9:00 P.M. | 1.8/6 | 9.61 | 13 | 7 | 4 |

=== Live + 7 Day (DVR) ratings ===
| No. in series | No. in season | Episode | Air date | Time slot (EST) | 18–49 rating increase | Viewers (millions) increase | Total 18–49 | Total viewers (millions) | Ref |
|---|---|---|---|---|---|---|---|---|---|
| 211 | 1 | "X" | October 1, 2014 | Wednesday; 9:00 p.m. | 1.8 | 4.53 | 4.5 | 16.28 | |
| 212 | 2 | "Burn" | October 8, 2014 | Wednesday; 9:00 p.m. | 1.5 | 4.02 | 3.8 | 14.60 | |
| 213 | 3 | "A Thousand Suns" | October 15, 2014 | Wednesday; 9:00 p.m. | 1.5 | 4.02 | 3.9 | 14.92 | |
| 214 | 4 | "The Itch" | October 22, 2014 | Wednesday; 9:00 p.m. | 1.4 | 3.92 | 3.9 | 13.84 | |
| 215 | 5 | "Boxed In" | October 29, 2014 | Wednesday; 9:00 p.m. | 1.5 | 3.71 | 3.8 | 14.20 | |
| 216 | 6 | "If the Shoe Fits" | November 5, 2014 | Wednesday; 9:00 p.m. | 1.7 | 4.39 | 3.8 | 14.18 | |
| 217 | 7 | "Hashtag" | November 12, 2014 | Wednesday; 9:00 p.m. | 1.6 | 4.10 | 3.9 | 14.45 | |
| 218 | 8 | "The Boys of Sudworth Place" | November 19, 2014 | Wednesday; 9:00 p.m. | 1.5 | 4.04 | 3.8 | 14.71 | |
| 219 | 9 | "Fate" | November 26, 2014 | Wednesday; 9:00 p.m. | 1.6 | 3.83 | 3.8 | 14.89 | |
| 220 | 10 | "Amelia Porter" | December 10, 2014 | Wednesday; 9:00 p.m. | 1.6 | 4.02 | 3.7 | 14.11 | |
| 221 | 11 | "The Forever People" | January 14, 2015 | Wednesday; 9:00 p.m. | 1.4 | 4.15 | 3.6 | 14.46 | |
| 222 | 12 | "Anonymous" | January 21, 2015 | Wednesday; 9:00 p.m. | 1.5 | 4.11 | 3.5 | 14.40 | |
| 223 | 13 | "Nelson's Sparrow" | January 28, 2015 | Wednesday; 9:00 p.m. | 1.6 | 4.28 | 3.7 | 14.99 | |
| 224 | 14 | "Hero Worship" | February 4, 2015 | Wednesday; 9:00 p.m. | 1.5 | 3.92 | 3.5 | 14.40 | |
| 225 | 15 | "Scream" | February 11, 2015 | Wednesday; 9:00 p.m. | 1.4 | 3.66 | 3.3 | 13.62 | |
| 226 | 16 | "Lockdown" | March 4, 2015 | Wednesday; 9:00 p.m. | 1.6 | 4.28 | 3.6 | 14.67 | |
| 227 | 17 | "Breath Play" | March 11, 2015 | Wednesday; 9:00 p.m. | 1.4 | 3.57 | 3.5 | 14.03 | |
| 228 | 18 | "Rock Creek Park" | March 25, 2015 | Wednesday; 9:00 p.m. | 1.4 | 4.21 | 3.6 | 14.20 | |
| 229 | 19 | "Beyond Borders" | April 8, 2015 | Wednesday; 9:00 p.m. | 1.4 | 4.00 | 3.5 | 14.40 | |
| 230 | 20 | "A Place at the Table" | April 15, 2015 | Wednesday; 9:00 p.m. | 1.4 | 3.74 | 3.5 | 14.11 | |
| 231 | 21 | "Mr. Scratch" | April 22, 2015 | Wednesday; 9:00 p.m. | 1.5 | 3.93 | 3.5 | 13.99 | |
| 232 | 22 | "Protection" | April 29, 2015 | Wednesday; 9:00 p.m. | 1.3 | 3.59 | 3.1 | 12.30 | |
| 233 | 23 | "The Hunt" | May 6, 2015 | Wednesday; 9:00 p.m. | 1.4 | 3.74 | 3.2 | 13.35 | |

== Home media ==
The Complete Tenth Season
| Set details | | Special features |
| 23 episodes; 6-disc set (Region 1); 5-disc set (Region 2 & 4); Aspect Ratio: 1.78:1; Subtitles: English; English: Dolby Digital 5.1 | | Memo From The Acting Director; H.I.M. Business As Usual; Criminal Minds International; Payback's An Itch; Origin Story; Greatest Hits; Salute; Gag Reel; Deleted Scenes |
DVD release date
| Region 1 | Region 2 | Region 4 |
| August 25, 2015 | December 7, 2015 | December 2, 2015 |
