= Criminal Minds: Beyond Borders =

American police procedural television series

- Genre: Police procedural; Crime drama
- Created by: Erica Messer
- Starring: Gary Sinise; Alana de la Garza; Daniel Henney; Tyler James Williams; Annie Funke
- Country of origin: United States
- Original language: English
- No. of seasons: 2
- No. of episodes: 26

Production
- Executive producers: Erica Messer; Mark Gordon; Nick Pepper; Adam Glass
- Producers: Gary Sinise; Matthew Lau
- Running time: 40–45 minutes
- Production companies: The Mark Gordon Company; Erica Messer Productions; CBS Television Studios; ABC Studios

Original release
- Network: CBS
- Release: March 16, 2016 – May 17, 2017

Related
- Criminal Minds; Criminal Minds: Suspect Behavior

Criminal Minds: Beyond Borders is an American police procedural television series created by Erica Messer that aired on CBS from March 16, 2016, to May 17, 2017. Produced by The Mark Gordon Company in association with CBS Television Studios and ABC Studios, it is a spin-off of Criminal Minds, airing on the same network, and is the third series in the Criminal Minds franchise. Criminal Minds: Beyond Borders follows an elite team of FBI agents of the fictional International Response Team (IRT) tasked with solving cases that involve American citizens on international soil.

CBS aired a backdoor pilot on an episode of Criminal Minds on April 8, 2015, introducing the characters with a crossover episode eponymously titled "Beyond Borders". The series was originally intended to premiere on March 2, 2016, but was pushed back by two weeks and instead premiered on March 16, 2016, and filled the Wednesday 10:00 p.m. time slot, airing immediately after the original Criminal Minds.

On May 14, 2017, CBS canceled the series after two seasons.

== Characters ==
=== Main ===
- Jack Garrett (Gary Sinise), Senior Supervisory Special Agent and International Unit Chief.

Garrett is a 20-year veteran agent with the FBI and is the Unit Chief of the International Response Team (IRT). In his personal life, Garrett is married to Karen (Sherry Stringfield) and together have six children, including their oldest, a son named Ryan and their middle child, a daughter named Josie.

- Clara Seger (Alana de la Garza), Senior Supervisory Special Agent, Linguistics Specialist, and Cultural Anthropologist.

Seger is a smart, well-traveled, and multi-lingual cultural anthropologist and special agent with the IRT. Before rejoining the IRT in October 2015, Seger was married to a man named Brad who was a fellow agent and, like her, knew Jack. In 2013, she took a sabbatical from the FBI after her husband Brad died, during which she visited countries across the globe.

- Matthew Simmons (Daniel Henney), Supervisory Special Agent and Special Operations Agent.

Simmons is a Special Operations agent and special agent with the IRT. Simmons is married to his wife Kristy (Kelly Frye) and has a total of four children, including two boys Jake and David and twin daughters, all of them under the age of three. He was a former member of a Special Ops unit, and his experience with the unit allowed him to hone his profiling skills.

- Russ Montgomery (Tyler James Williams), Supervisory Special Agent and Technical Analyst.

Montgomery is a technical analyst with the IRT. He upholds a positive attitude, though he shows it in a different way. In addition to his job as a technical analyst, he liaises with the families of victims on the American homeland while the rest of his group is away.

- Mae Jarvis (Annie Funke), Supervisory Special Agent and Medical Examiner.

Jarvis is a medical examiner and special agent with the IRT. Young and spunky, Mae has a fun-loving sibling relationship with Simmons and was in the FBI purely as a medical examiner before being brought onto the IRT as a resident medical examiner to bypass the bureaucratic red tape in various countries. By the events of the first season, Mae had become a fully qualified FBI field agent, in addition to being the IRT's resident ME.

=== Recurring ===
- Karen Garrett (Sherry Stringfield), Jack's wife and the mother of their six children.
- Josie Garrett (Brittany Uomoleale), the middle daughter of Jack and Karen Garrett's six children.
- Kristy Simmons (Kelly Frye), the wife of Matthew Simmons and the mother of their four children, Jake and David Simmons and their two daughters.
- Jake Simmons (Ezra Dewey), the son of Matthew and Kristy Simmons and the brother to David Simmons.
- David Simmons (Declan Whaley), the son of Matthew and Kristy Simmons and the brother to Jake Simmons.
- Ryan Garrett (Matt Cohen), Jack's and Karen's oldest son who was accepted to and received training at the FBI Academy. He later becomes an undercover agent in Mexico, where he crosses paths with the IRT in the second season.

== Episodes ==
Season	Episodes	Originally released	
Season	Episodes	First released	Last released
Backdoor pilot		April 8, 2015	
1	13	March 16, 2016	May 25, 2016
2	13	March 8, 2017	May 17, 2017

In total 26 episodes of Beyond Borders have aired, in addition to the pilot episode, "Beyond Borders".

=== Backdoor pilot (2015) ===
The program and its characters are introduced during the tenth season of Criminal Minds. The Criminal Minds episode, "Beyond Borders", served as a backdoor pilot episode for the show.

No. overall	No. in season	Title	Directed by	Written by	Original release date	Prod. code	US viewers (millions)
229	19	"Beyond Borders"	Glenn Kershaw	Erica Messer	April 8, 2015	1019	10.39
When a Fairfax County, Virginia family of four is abducted while vacationing in Barbados, the IRT works with the BAU to connect the crime to the unsolved murders of two other families in Aruba and Florida, respectively, and track down a family annihilator who forces his victims to reenact moments from his abusive childhood.

=== Season 1 (2016) ===
No. overall	No. in season	Title	Directed by	Written by	Original release date	Prod. code	US viewers (millions)
1	1	"The Harmful One"	Colin Bucksey	Erica Messer	March 8, 2011	101	8.88
2	2	"Harvested"	Rob Bailey	Erica Meredith	March 15, 2011	104	7.78
3	3	"Denial"	Rod Holcomb	Adam Glass	March 22, 2011	107	7.07
4	4	"Whispering Death"	Larry Teng	Adam Glass	March 29, 2011	110	7.44
5	5	"The Lonely Heart"	Constantine Makris	Ticona S. Joy	April 5, 2011	108	6.98
6	6	"Love Interrupted"	Paul A. Kaufman	Adam Glass	April 12, 2011	102	7.91
7	7	"Citizens of the World"	Alec Smight	Matthew Lau	April 19, 2011	106	7.55
8	8	"De Los Inocentes"	Jeannot Szwarc	Christopher Barbour	April 26, 2011	103	6.58
9	9	"The Matchmaker"	Matt Earl Beesley	Tim Clemente	May 3, 2011	109	6.82
10	10	"Iqiniso"	Laura Belsey	Christopher Barbour	May 10, 2011	111	6.05
11	11	"The Ballad of Nick and Nat"	Jeremiah Chechik	Daniele Nathanson	May 17, 2011	105	5.94
12	12	"El Toro Bravo"	Tawnia McKiernan	Erica Meredith	May 24, 2011	112	5.74
13	13	"Paper Orphans"	Félix Enríquez Alcalá	Erica Messer	May 31, 2011	113	5.19

=== Season 2 (2017) ===
No. overall	No. in season	Title	Directed by	Written by	Original release date	Prod. code	US viewers (millions)
14	1	"Lost Souls"	Alec Smight	Erica Messer	March 8, 2017	201	5.35
15	2	"Il Mostro"	Leon Ichaso	Christopher Barbour	March 15, 2017	204	5.37
16	3	"The Devil's Breath"	Oz Scott	Adam Glass	March 22, 2017	202	4.78
17	4	"Pretty Like Me"	Greg Prange	Daniele Nathanson	March 29, 2017	206	4.97
18	5	"Made In..."	Jeannot Szwarc	Erica Meredith	April 5, 2017	205	4.61
19	6	"Cinderella and the Dragon"	Diana C. Valentine	Matthew Lau	April 12, 2017	203	5.74
20	7	"La Huesuda"	Rod Holcomb	Adam Glass	April 12, 2017	207	4.72
21	8	"Pankration"	Laura Belsey	Ticona S. Joy	April 19, 2017	208	4.74
22	9	"Blowback"	Nina Lopez-Corrado	Christopher Barbour	April 26, 2017	209	4.56
23	10	"Type A"	Christoph Schrewe	Tim Clemente	May 3, 2017	210	5.00
24	11	"Obey"	Constantine Makris	Daniele Nathanson	May 10, 2017	211	4.85
25	12	"Abominable"	Jennifer Lynch	Matthew Lau	May 17, 2017	212	4.87
26	13	"The Ripper of Riga"	Mikael Salomon	Adam Glass	May 17, 2017	213	4.16

== Production ==
A proposed new series in the Criminal Minds franchise was announced in January 2015, and was to be named Criminal Minds: Beyond Borders. Former CSI: NY star Gary Sinise and Anna Gunn had been cast in the lead roles of Jack Garrett and Lily Lambert, with Tyler James Williams and Daniel Henney being cast as Russ "Monty" Montgomery and Matthew "Matt" Simmons, respectively.

On May 8, 2015, CBS announced that Criminal Minds: Beyond Borders had been picked up for the 2015–16 season; however, it was soon announced that Gunn had departed the series, with Alana de la Garza and Annie Funke further being cast as series regulars.

== Reception ==
=== Critical response ===
The first season of Criminal Minds: Beyond Borders received generally unfavorable reviews from critics. The review aggregator Rotten Tomatoes gave the first season a 20% of approval with an average rating of 3.5/10, based on 15 reviews, with the critical consensus reading, "Beyond Borders relies on the same characters and storylines the franchise has used for years, with an extra undertow of xenophobic paranoia." On Metacritic, the season was given a score of 28 out of 100, based on 11 critics, indicating "generally unfavorable reviews".

The series has received criticism from both viewers and critics for its "inaccurate" depictions of the countries the episodes are set in. In its review of the show, pop culture news website The A.V. Club labeled the series as "bland" and "xenophobic". In a more scathing commentary, Slate and USA Today have opined that the show was "jingoistic", especially due to the then-current context of Donald Trump's xenophobic 2016 presidential campaign rhetoric. Following the airing of the episode "Cinderella and the Dragon", which was set in Singapore, the network received significant backlash from locals regarding the "misleading" representations of Singapore and Singaporeans, with local Internet celebrity blogger mrbrown and the Singapore Tourism Board posting up their own satirical responses.

=== Ratings ===
Seasonal rankings (based on average total viewers per episode) of Criminal Minds: Beyond Borders.

Note: Each American network television season starts in late September and ends in late May, which coincides with the completion of May sweeps.

Season	Episodes	Time slot (EST)	Premiered		Ended		TV season	Rank	Viewers (in millions)
Season	Episodes	Time slot (EST)	Date	Premiere viewers (in millions)	Date	Finale viewers (in millions)	TV season	Rank	Viewers (in millions)
1	13	Wednesday 10:00 pm (March 16 – May 25, 2016); Wednesday 9:00 pm (April 6, 2016; May 11; May 25, 2016)	March 16, 2016	8.88	May 25, 2016	5.19	2015–16	No. 46	9.02
2	13	Wednesday 10:00 pm (March 8 – May 17, 2017); Wednesday 9:00 pm (April 12, 2017; May 17, 2017)	March 8, 2017	5.35	May 17, 2017	4.16	2016–17	No. 56	6.91

== Home releases ==
Season	Episodes	DVD release dates			
Season	Episodes	Region 1	Region 2	Region 4	Discs
Pilot	1	August 25, 2015	December 7, 2015	December 2, 2015	6
1	13	September 20, 2016	TBA	TBA	4
2	13	November 23, 2018	TBA	TBA	3

== International broadcast ==
The series premiered in Australia on the Seven Network in April 2016. In Canada, the series airs simultaneously with the United States on CTV. The series also airs same day as the United States in Asia on AXN. On April 20, 2016, the series premiered on W in the United Kingdom and Ireland. On July 11, 2016, the series premiered on TV One in New Zealand.
