= Criminal Minds (video game) =

2012 video game

- Developer(s): Legacy Games
- Publisher(s): Legacy Games
- Platform(s): Microsoft Windows, macOS
- Release: April 19, 2012
- Genre(s): Mystery/Crime/Drama/Adventure
- Mode(s): Single-player

Criminal Minds is a spin-off video game based on the CBS police procedural television series of the same name created by Jeff Davis. The game contains two completely new cases for people to solve.

In 2018, a new Criminal Minds game was announced by CBS and Tilting Point. This game, titled Criminal Minds: The Mobile Game, is a time management game that features the entire season 14 BAU Team as playable characters, and was released on November 20, 2018, on Android & iOS devices.

A screenshot of the BAU Team on the jet.

== Release ==
The game was released on April 19, 2012.

== See also ==
- Criminal Minds: Suspect Behavior
