= Criminal Minds =

2005 American police procedural drama television series

- Also known as: Criminal Minds: Evolution (2022–present)
- Genre: Police procedural; Thriller; Crime drama; Mystery; Detective
- Created by: Jeff Davis
- Showrunners: Jeff Davis; Erica Messer
- Starring: Mandy Patinkin; Thomas Gibson; Lola Glaudini; Shemar Moore; Matthew Gray Gubler; A. J. Cook; Kirsten Vangsness; Paget Brewster; Joe Mantegna; Rachel Nichols; Jeanne Tripplehorn; Jennifer Love Hewitt; Aisha Tyler; Adam Rodriguez; Damon Gupton; Daniel Henney; RJ Hatanaka; Zach Gilford
- Country of origin: United States
- Original language: English
- No. of seasons: 19
- No. of episodes: 364 (list of episodes)

Production
- Executive producers: Mark Gordon; Jeff Davis; Edward Allen Bernero; Deborah Spera; Chris Mundy; Simon Mirren; Erica Messer; Janine Sherman Barrois; Breen Frazier; Harry Bring; Glenn Kershaw; Mandy Patinkin (season 1–2)
- Running time: 42–56 minutes
- Production companies: Lionsgate Television (Note: Credited as The Mark Gordon Company for seasons 1–13 and Entertainment One for seasons 14–16.); Erica Messer Productions (Note: Starting with season 16 and credited as P'Nut Productions for episodes 1–3 before reverting to the old name starting with episode 4.); 20th Television (Note: Credited as Touchstone Television through season 2, as ABC Studios for seasons 3–15 and as ABC Signature for seasons 16–17.); CBS Studios (Note: Credited as Paramount Television for season 1, CBS Paramount Television for seasons 2–4 and as CBS Television Studios for seasons 5–15.)

Original release
- Network: CBS
- Release: September 22, 2005 – February 19, 2020
- Network: Paramount+ (Note: Due to distribution rights, the Evolution seasons would instead stream on Disney+ in certain regions.)
- Release: November 24, 2022 – present

Related
- Criminal Minds: Suspect Behavior; Criminal Minds: Beyond Borders

Criminal Minds is an American police procedural crime drama television series created by Jeff Davis that premiered on CBS on September 22, 2005. It follows a group of criminal profilers who work for the FBI as members of its Behavioral Analysis Unit (BAU).

Criminal Minds became a ratings success for CBS, consistently ranking among the network’s most-watched programs and winning the People’s Choice Award for Best TV Crime Drama in 2017. Its success has spawned a media franchise, with several spinoffs, a South Korean adaptation, and a video game.

Criminal Minds originally culminated after its fifteenth season on February 19, 2020; however, it was revived and re-titled Criminal Minds: Evolution for its sixteenth season, which premiered on Paramount+ in November 2022. In March 2025, Criminal Minds was renewed for a nineteenth season, which premiered on May 28, 2026. In March 2026, Criminal Minds was renewed for a twentieth season. In October, it was confirmed that the upcoming twentieth season would be its last.

== Premise ==
The series follows a group of criminal profilers who work for the FBI as members of its Behavioral Analysis Unit (BAU) using behavioral analysis and profiling to help investigate crimes and find the suspect known as the unsub (unknown subject).

The team is supervised by Unit Chief Aaron Hotchner, and later Emily Prentiss. The team included Jason Gideon, the founder of the BAU, who was known as the best profiler in the Bureau; Derek Morgan, an ex-Chicago Police officer who is an expert on obsessional crimes; Spencer Reid, an expert on geographic profiling; Jennifer Jareau (JJ), the team's communications liaison, who later becomes a profiler; Elle Greenaway, an expert on sex crimes; David Rossi, one of the original BAU agents who is also an expert in criminal profiling; Ashley Seaver, a rookie FBI agent; Alex Blake, a linguistics specialist helping with nuances in communication; Kate Callahan, a seasoned undercover agent; Tara Lewis, a forensic psychologist; Luke Alvez, an expert fugitive tracker who becomes a profiler on the team; Stephen Walker, an expert on counterintelligence; and Matt Simmons, an expert profiler who joins the team from the FBI International Response Team.

== Episodes ==
Season	Episodes	Originally released		
Season	Episodes	First released	Last released	Network
Criminal Minds
1	22	September 22, 2005	May 10, 2006	CBS
2	23	September 20, 2006	May 16, 2007	CBS
3	20	September 26, 2007	May 21, 2008	CBS
4	26	September 24, 2008	May 20, 2009	CBS
5	23	September 23, 2009	May 26, 2010	CBS
6	24	September 22, 2010	May 18, 2011	CBS
7	24	September 21, 2011	May 16, 2012	CBS
8	24	September 26, 2012	May 22, 2013	CBS
9	24	September 25, 2013	May 14, 2014	CBS
10	23	October 1, 2014	May 6, 2015	CBS
11	22	September 30, 2015	May 4, 2016	CBS
12	22	September 28, 2016	May 10, 2017	CBS
13	22	September 27, 2017	April 18, 2018	CBS
14	15	October 3, 2018	February 6, 2019	CBS
15	10	January 8, 2020	February 19, 2020	CBS
Criminal Minds: Evolution
16	10	November 24, 2022	February 9, 2023	Paramount+
17	10	June 6, 2024	August 1, 2024	Paramount+
18	10	May 8, 2025	July 10, 2025	Paramount+
19	10	May 28, 2026	July 23, 2026	Paramount+

== Characters ==
Cast members in 2011–12: (left to right) Gibson, Cook, Gubler, Mantegna, Brewster, and Moore. Absent: Kirsten Vangsness

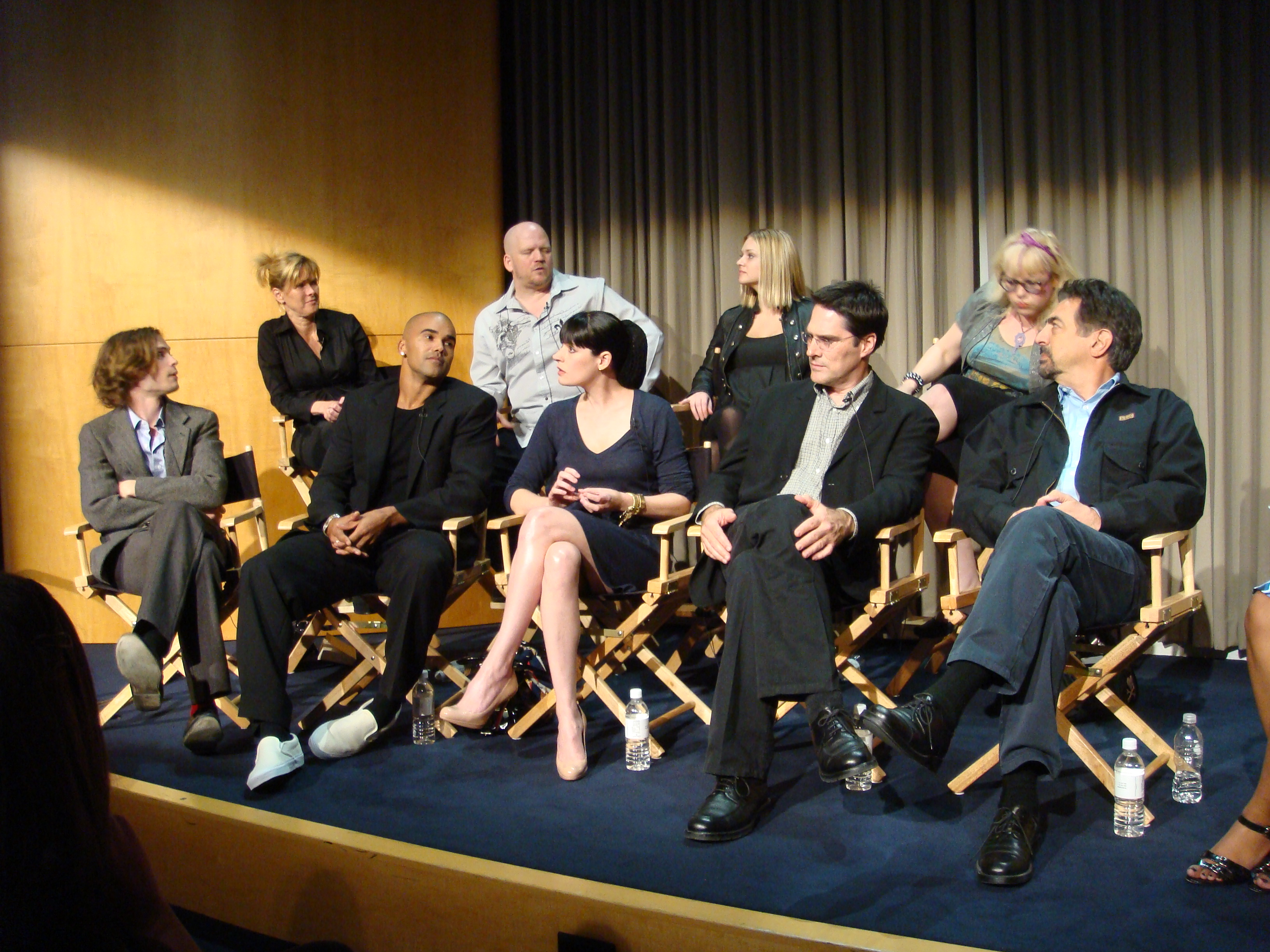
Cast and crew at a Paley Centre discussion of the show

=== Main ===
- Jason Gideon (Mandy Patinkin; Seasons 1–3), FBI Senior Supervisory Special Agent and formerly BAU Unit chief.

Gideon is widely known as the BAU's best profiler. After a series of emotionally troubling cases and the murder of his girlfriend Sarah by fugitive serial killer Frank Breitkopf (Keith Carradine), he begins to feel burned out. The last straw occurs when Unit Chief Aaron Hotchner is suspended for two weeks by the team's boss—an action for which Jason feels responsible. He retreats to his cabin and leaves a letter for Spencer Reid, whom he knows will be the one to look for him. When Spencer arrives at the cabin, he finds the letter and Jason's FBI credentials and firearm. Jason is last seen remarking to a Nevada diner waitress that he does not know where he is going or how he will know when he gets there, leaving the diner and driving off. In season 10, he is killed (off-screen) by a suspect he had tracked down from one of his first cases.

- Aaron Hotchner (Thomas Gibson; Seasons 1–12), FBI Supervisory Special Agent and Unit Chief of the BAU, previously an agent in the Seattle field office.

Aaron "Hotch" Hotchner is a former prosecutor and was originally assigned to the FBI field office in Seattle. He is one of the most experienced agents in the BAU. He struggles to balance the demands of his job with his family life, but his wife, Haley Brooks (Meredith Monroe), divorces him in season three. In the episode "100" (season 5), Haley is killed by fugitive serial killer George Foyet (C. Thomas Howell), also known as "The Boston Reaper", whom Aaron fights and beats to death. He also has a son named Jack (Cade Owens) and a brother named Sean. After Haley is murdered, he has custody of Jack, and Haley's sister, Jessica Brooks (Molly Baker), helps him take care of Jack. When SSA Jennifer Jareau leaves the BAU, Aaron and technical analyst Penelope Garcia take over her job as communications liaison. Aaron dated a woman named Beth Clemmons (Bellamy Young), who first appeared in the episode "The Bittersweet Science" (season 7), before the couple separated after Clemmons accepted a job in Hong Kong. Following an on-set altercation, Thomas Gibson was removed from the main cast after season 12, episode 2, at which point his character Hotch went on a temporary assignment. In a later episode, Aaron and Jack went into witness protection after Jack was stalked by Peter "Mr. Scratch" Lewis, a serial killer from a previous BAU case. Following Peter Lewis's death in the 13th-season premiere, Prentiss reveals that Aaron has opted not to return to the BAU to focus on his son but still believes Prentiss should continue being chief.

- Elle Greenaway (Lola Glaudini; Seasons 1 & 2), FBI Supervisory Special Agent.

Greenaway is assigned to the FBI field office in Seattle and assigned to the BAU as an expert in sexual offense crimes. Elle develops extreme emotional trauma after being shot by an unsub in the season one finale ("The Fisher King (Part 1)"). In the season two premiere ("The Fisher King (Part 2)"), Elle survives and returns to duty sooner than SSA Jason Gideon and Unit Chief Aaron Hotchner would like. Several episodes later, while alone on a stakeout of a suspected serial rapist, she murders the suspect by shooting him in cold blood and planting her gun on the unarmed victim. The local police deem it self defense, but Jason and Aaron question her ability as a profiler after this. Elle resigns, turning in her badge and gun to Aaron, declaring that it is "not an admission of guilt".

- Derek Morgan (Shemar Moore; Main: Seasons 1–11, Guest: Seasons 12 & 13), FBI Supervisory Special Agent and former Chicago Police officer. Morgan is a confident, assertive, and often hot-tempered character. He was raised by his mother Fran along with his two sisters, Sarah Morgan and Desiree Benita, after the death of his police officer father right in front of him. Derek was a troubled Chicago youth headed for juvenile delinquency. He was rescued and mentored by Carl Buford (Julius Tennon), who turned out to be a sexual predator who molested Derek and other young boys; he was eventually arrested for murder. After developing an interest in football, Derek attended Northwestern University on a scholarship. After a football injury left him unable to play, he joined the Chicago Police Department's bomb squad and later joined the FBI and the BAU. He has an emotionally intimate but platonic relationship with technical analyst Penelope Garcia; the two have a unique shorthand and banter. In the season seven premiere ("It Takes a Village"), Derek shows utter hatred toward Ian Doyle (Timothy V. Murphy) for killing SSA Emily Prentiss, but when Emily returns alive, he has mixed feelings. In season eleven, Derek is kidnapped and tortured by the father of Giuseppe Montolo, a hitman whom Derek put away and who later died while in custody. Derek escapes and when he learns his girlfriend Savannah is pregnant, he realizes that he does not want to put his family through something like this again. Derek leaves the BAU in the episode "A Beautiful Disaster" to care for his now-wife and newborn son.
- Dr. Spencer Reid (Matthew Gray Gubler; Main: Seasons 1–15; Guest Season 18), FBI Supervisory Special Agent
  The youngest member of the team, Reid is a genius who graduated from Las Vegas High School at age twelve and holds Ph.D.s in mathematics, chemistry, and engineering as well as Bachelor of Arts degrees in psychology and sociology. As of season four, he is also working on a B.A. in philosophy. Reid has an IQ of 187, can read a dizzying twenty thousand words per minute, and has an eidetic memory. Throughout the series, Reid is portrayed as autistic, including in seasons one and eight. Most of the members of the team are intimidated by his profound knowledge. Reid is habitually introduced as "Dr. Spencer Reid" in contrast to the other agents, who are introduced as "supervisory special agents". The purpose of this, as explained by Unit Chief Aaron Hotchner in the pilot episode ("Extreme Aggressor"), is to create a respectable first impression of Spencer, deflecting judgments about his age. His mother Diana Reid (Jane Lynch) has schizophrenia and is committed to a mental institution. In season six, Reid starts suffering from cluster headaches and when doctors cannot diagnose why, Reid thinks he might be in the early stages of schizophrenia himself. Reid takes SSA Emily Prentiss' death very hard and, when he learns that the death was faked, he becomes distrustful of both Prentiss and SSA Jennifer "JJ" Jareau (who helped in the cover up) for some time. During season eight, Reid becomes involved with a woman who was being stalked. In the episode "Zugzwang", her stalker ultimately kidnaps her and kills her, devastating Reid. In season 11, he is deeply affected by Derek Morgan's decision to leave the BAU but understands and supports his reasons. Morgan and Reid have been close, and Morgan refers to Reid as his "little brother" prior to his departure in season eleven. Initially Reid was infatuated with Jareau, even going as far as taking her on a date to a football game. As the series progresses, their relationship becomes more like siblings. However they confess romantic feelings for each other in seasons 14 and 15, but nothing ever comes of it because of Jareau's marriage and children. Spencer is also the godfather of Jennifer's son Henry and Derek's son Hank. Derek also gives his child the middle name of "Spencer" in honor of Reid, further signifying their bond. In season twelve, Reid is arrested and finds himself in prison for the second half of the season. He develops a flirtatious relationship with serial killer Cat Adams in season eleven. It is obvious she has feelings for Spencer, though it is never made clear whether he also had feelings for her or if he simply flirted to get her to reveal her plans. Initially, Reid was intended to be bisexual.
- Jennifer "JJ" Jareau (A. J. Cook; Main: Seasons 1–5 and 7–present; Guest: Season 6), FBI Supervisory Special Agent and former BAU communications liaison.

JJ served as the communications liaison on the team to local police agencies in seasons 1–5. She dates and marries William LaMontagne (Josh Stewart), a New Orleans Police Department detective. They have two sons, Henry LaMontagne (Mekhai Andersen) and Michael LaMontagne (Phoenix Sky Andersen). Both boys are played by A.J. Cook's real life sons. In the episode "JJ" (season six), Jennifer is forced to accept a promotion at the Pentagon, causing her departure from the team, although Unit Chief Aaron Hotchner expresses his hope that she will return to the BAU in the future. Jennifer returns in the episode "Lauren" (season six) to assist the team in finding SSA Emily Prentiss (Paget Brewster). Jennifer returns as a series regular in the season seven premiere as a legitimate profiler and admits to helping fake Prentiss' death, much to the dismay of her colleagues. In the 200th episode, JJ is kidnapped because of a secret mission she performed while at the Pentagon. At the end of season ten, JJ reveals she is pregnant with her second child and consults over the phone for a few episodes of season eleven before rejoining the team in the field in the episode "Target Rich".

- Penelope Garcia (Kirsten Vangsness; Recurring: Season 1, Main: Seasons 1 – present), BAU technical analyst and BAU communications liaison.

Garcia joined the BAU after bringing attention to herself by illegally accessing some of their equipment, while she was an underground hacker; she is offered a job in lieu of a jail sentence. She submitted her resume to Hotch on pink stationery. She usually supports the team from her computer lab at Quantico but occasionally joins them on location when her skills can be used in the field. She is a leader in a support group for those who have lost someone in their lives. Her parents were killed by a drunk driver when they were out looking for her when she was a teen and had missed her curfew. She enjoys a flirtatious relationship with SSA Derek Morgan, often engaging in comical banter of a sexually suggestive nature when he calls for information. He calls her "Baby Girl". She was once shot and almost killed by Jason Clark Battle, who lured her on a date in the episode "Lucky" (season three). When SSA Jennifer Jareau leaves the BAU, Penelope and Unit Chief Aaron Hotchner take over her job as communications liaison. She is kidnapped once again at the end of season thirteen. SSA Sam Cooper (Criminal Minds: Suspect Behavior) often calls when his team needs her computer skills. Penelope is the godmother of both Jennifer's son, Henry, and Morgan's son, Hank.

- Emily Prentiss (Paget Brewster; Main: Seasons 2–7 and 12–present; Guest: Seasons 9 & 11), supervisory special agent and BAU Unit Chief

Prentiss is the daughter of Ambassador Elizabeth Prentiss (Kate Jackson). After SSA Elle Greenaway leaves the BAU, Section Chief Erin Strauss approves Emily to join the BAU. The plan was for Emily to report any problems within the BAU, but Emily remained loyal to the team and refused to report any problems, going so far as threatening resignation. Emily is also fluent in several languages, such as Spanish, French, Arabic and Italian, and has a working knowledge of Russian. She is apparently killed while being held hostage by Ian Doyle in the episode "Lauren" (season six), but in the last scene of the episode, it is revealed that she survived her encounter with Ian and is seen with SSA Jennifer Jareau in Paris passing her passports and bank accounts for protection. In the season seven premiere ("It Takes a Village"), she returns alive and well, much to the team's surprise. In the season seven finale ("Run"), Emily decides to leave the BAU after accepting a position running and returning to the Interpol office in London. She returns for the 200th episode to help rescue a kidnapped SSA Jennifer Jareau and again in the episode "Tribute" (season eleven), where she enlists the help of the BAU in catching a serial killer who had originally killed in Europe before killing in the United States. Paget Brewster was confirmed to return for a several-episode arc in season twelve. Following the dismissal of Thomas Gibson, Brewster was promoted to a series regular again starting from season twelve, episode three; later Prentiss is promoted to Hotch's position of unit chief. Prentiss is suspended from her position for a brief portion of season thirteen, following scrutiny by her superior Linda Barnes on her behaviour as unit chief during Reid's imprisonment in Mexico. Prentiss was quickly reinstated, however, after the BAU worked a case that saved the life of a government official's daughter.

- David Rossi (Joe Mantegna; Seasons 3 – present), senior supervisory special agent with an Italian background. Rossi is a highly experienced profiler who once worked the BAU in its origins, then took early retirement in 1997 to write books and go on lecture tours about criminal analysis, until volunteering to return shortly after SSA Jason Gideon's departure in 2007. He has been married three times and is quite wealthy because of his successful writing career. In the episode "From Childhood's Hour" (season seven), David reconnects with his first wife, Carolyn Baker, who has shocking news for him. It is revealed that she came to him because she was diagnosed with ALS (Lou Gehrig's disease) and wants David to assist in her suicide. In the next episode ("Epilogue"), Carolyn dies after taking a drug overdose. It is also revealed in this episode that David had a son who died at birth. In the season eight episode "The Fallen", it is revealed that David was a Marine in Vietnam. The season seven finale ("Hit") reveals SSA David Rossi may be having a secret relationship with Section Chief Erin Strauss; this was discovered when Garcia and Spencer spot them both leaving a hotel. In the last season eight episode ("The Replicator") we see their relationship has been known to the entire team. The episode is an emotional one for SSA David Rossi since Unit Chief Erin Strauss is murdered by The Replicator. She was taken from her hotel room, where he had planned to meet her that night, drugged and put on the streets of New York disoriented for Hotchner to find her. The episode's last scene is SSA David Rossi eulogizing her to the team after her funeral, at a gathering at his home. In season ten we learn that David has a daughter from his second wife. Since then, he is shown to have a strong relationship with his daughter, son-in-law, and grandson, even approving of her husband's Italian heritage. In season eleven Rossi reunites with his second wife, and they give their relationship a second chance.
- Ashley Seaver (Rachel Nichols; Season 6), FBI cadet and special agent.

Seaver replaces SSA Jennifer Jareau after she is forced to accept a promotion at the Pentagon. She was chosen for her unique background; her father, Charles Beauchamp, was a horrific serial killer known as the "Redmond Ripper", who murdered dozens of women before being caught by the BAU, incidentally. At first, Hotchner was going to make her a special one time consultant to the BAU, but Rossi allowed her to finish her remedial training with the team under the supervision of Prentiss. In the episode "... With Friends Like These" (season six), she graduated from the academy and had been added to the team as a "probationary agent". In the seasonseven premiere ("It Takes a Village"), Jennifer reveals to Emily that Ashley transferred to the domestic trafficking task force, which is led by Andi Swann.

- Alex Blake (Jeanne Tripplehorn; Seasons 8 & 9), FBI linguistics expert, supervisory special agent, and professor at Georgetown University.

Blake once worked for the BAU during the 2001 anthrax attacks but retired after a conflict with Chief Erin Strauss and rejoins the BAU after SSA Emily Prentiss transfers to the Interpol office in London. Alex first appears in the season 8 premiere ("The Silencer"). She makes a personal connection with Spencer Reid after he reveals to her that he has begun a romantic relationship with a woman whom he has never met. In the season 9 finale, after a difficult case in Texas in which the team is targeted by a group of corrupt sheriff deputies and Reid is shot, she escorts Reid to his apartment, explaining that the experience brought back memories of her son's death and that Reid reminds her of him. She leaves behind her credentials, which Reid finds in his bag before seeing Blake leave in a taxi, saddened but understanding.

- Kate Callahan (Jennifer Love Hewitt; Season 10), former FBI undercover agent and supervisory special agent.

Callahan, as mentioned in the season ten premiere, previously worked under Andi Swann's team, which is also Ashley Seaver's team since she left the BAU. She is a "seasoned undercover agent whose stellar work at the FBI has landed her a coveted position with the Behavioral Analysis Unit". She and her husband, Chris, have been the guardians of Kate's teenage niece, Meg, since Meg was a baby following her parents' deaths in the September 11, 2001, attacks. Kate and Chris discover they are expecting a baby in the middle of season 10, coinciding with the actress's real-life pregnancy. At the end of season 10, she decides to take a year off and raise her baby.

- Tara Lewis (Aisha Tyler; Main: Seasons 12 – present; Recurring: Season 11), forensic psychologist and supervisory special agent.

Lewis is a psychologist with an eye on forensic psychology and its application to the criminal justice system. Her dream was to study psychopaths up close and personal and her psychology background, combined with her experience in the FBI, brought her face to face with monsters. Her job was to stare them down and interview them, to determine if they were fit to stand trial. Lewis replaced both JJ (A. J. Cook) and Kate (Jennifer Love Hewitt) while they were on maternity leave in the eleventh season.

- Luke Alvez (Adam Rodriguez; Seasons 12 – present), fugitive task force agent and supervisory special agent.

Alvez is a member of the FBI fugitive task force that partners with the BAU to catch the serial killers that escaped in the season eleven finale. In the season twelve premiere, he works with the BAU to catch the "Crimson King", one of the escapees that attacked Alvez's old partner. The team discovers the real killer is "Mr. Scratch", who taunts the team by turning over the real "Crimson King", who was tortured to the point he no longer remembers who he was. After that, Alvez decides to join the BAU full time and was Hotch's last hire. Alvez has a Belgian Malinois dog named Roxy (whom Garcia thought at first was his girlfriend) and served in Iraq as an Army Ranger prior to joining the FBI.

- Stephen Walker (Damon Gupton; Season 12), supervisory special agent

Walker is a supervisory special agent with the BAU. Walker was a member of the Behavioral Analysis Program. He was contacted by Emily Prentiss (Paget Brewster) about joining the BAU to assist in the manhunt for Peter Lewis, a k a "Mr. Scratch". Walker is an experienced profiler with about twenty years under his belt and was a member of the FBI's Behavioral Analysis Program before his transfer to the BAU. He is married to a woman named Monica and has two children with her, Maya and Eli. He met Emily Prentiss, then the chief of Interpol's London office, during his line of work. He was also mentored by David Rossi (Joe Mantegna). Stephen's first case concerned a terrorist cell in Belgium, and three agents were sent undercover to infiltrate it. However, Stephen's profile was wrong, and this resulted in the deaths of the undercover agents. He eventually moved on from the trauma and improved as he went along in his career. He and other BAP agents, including his longtime friend Sam Bower, were sent undercover to investigate corruption in the Russian government. Walker's skills include being fluent in Russian and playing the trombone. In the season 13 premiere, it is revealed he had died in the car crash Mr. Scratch had arranged as a trap for the team at the end of season twelve.

- Matt Simmons (Daniel Henney; Main: Seasons 13–15; Guest: Seasons 10 & 12), supervisory special agent, and former member of the International Response Team.

Simmons is a special operations agent and formerly worked with the IRT. Simmons has a wife, Kristy (Kelly Frye), and has a total of four children. He was a former member of a special ops unit, and his experience with the unit allowed him to hone his profiling skills. Following the disbandment of the IRT, Simmons assists the BAU in taking down Mr. Scratch and is later recruited to the BAU as a replacement for the late Stephen Walker, becoming the last addition to the team in the series' original run. At the end of the fourteenth season, Simmons and Kristy announce their pregnancy with the fifth child, and the following year.

- Tyler Green (RJ Hatanaka; Main: Season 17–present; Recurring: Season 16), special agent.

Green is a former Army drone spotter. After his sister disappeared, Green searched for her and determined she had been killed by the serial killer Sicarius, deciding to infiltrate his network to find him. After being caught by the BAU, Green begins helping them on the Sicarius case and has a brief relationship with Garcia. In season seventeen, Green officially becomes a consultant for the BAU in helping with another case, though he has a tendency to work off the book. In season 18, Green becomes an FBI agent and continues to work with the BAU.

- Elias Voit (Zach Gilford; Main: Seasons 17–19; Recurring: Season 16)

Voit, also known by the alias Sicarius, is a serial killer. During the COVID-19 pandemic he travelled around the United States and planted "kill kits". He later founded a network of serial killers who used these kits to commit their crimes. At the end of Season 16, Voit is caught and arrested, but the following season the BAU is forced to work with him to catch another serial killer.

=== Recurring ===
- Erin Strauss (Jayne Atkinson; Seasons 2–3, 5–9; Guest Season 15) an assistant director and the BAU Unit Chief's direct superior. While her FBI experience was primarily in administration, SSA Derek Morgan remarked on her masterly marksmanship after observing her at a firing range. In early episodes, Strauss appeared only concerned with herself and appearances within the Bureau, going so far as to force SSA Jennifer Jareau to accept a promotion to the Pentagon in the episode "JJ" (season 6). Further character development revealed her alcohol abuse. After being confronted by Morgan and Hotchner, Strauss accepts help and achieves sobriety. In the season 8 finale, The Replicator breaks into Strauss's hotel room in New York, drugs her, and forces her—at gunpoint—to drink alcohol from her room's minibar. Hotchner finds her on a bench near the hotel, where Strauss dies in his arms. Her death is avenged when Rossi traps the Replicator in an exploding house. Fittingly, Strauss's sobriety helps defeat the Replicator as Rossi uses her sobriety chip to escape the Replicator's trap and taunts him with it. After attending her funeral, the members of the BAU gather in a still-emotional Rossi's backyard, reminisce, and toast her memory. Showrunner Erica Messer chose to kill Strauss off because she felt that the character had come full circle since she was first introduced.
- Haley Hotchner (Meredith Monroe; Seasons 1–3, 5, 9) is Agent Aaron Hotchner's wife and the mother of his only son, Jack Hotchner, born in late 2005. The couple's marriage was troubled, and she walked out on him. She later appeared with divorce papers, and he accepted reluctantly so as not to cause any trouble for his son with the divorce. In the episode "100" (season 5), Haley and Jack were captured by a killer known as "The Reaper"; though Jack was saved, Haley was shot and died before Aaron could save her. Aaron later beat The Reaper to death. In the episode "Route 66", Hotch collapses from internal bleeding and dreams about Haley. She tells him that he should stop blaming himself for her death and to make sure Jack knows that he can talk about his mother's death. Haley leaves Hotch by telling him that he and Beth have a good relationship and he shouldn't mess it up by not telling her how he feels.
- Jessica Brooks (Molly Baker; Seasons 1, 3, 5, 9–11), is Agent Aaron Hotchner's sister-in-law, Jack's aunt, and Haley's sister.
- Jordan Todd (Meta Golding; Season 4) is SSA Jennifer Jareau's handpicked replacement to serve as the BAU's media director during Jennifer's maternity leave, from late 2008 through early 2009. Jordan had formerly served in the FBI counterterrorism division, but follows Jennifer for only one day of shadowing before Jennifer goes into labor. Jordan seemed to get along well with most of the team, even flirting platonically with SSA Derek Morgan. She is especially close with SSA David Rossi, who is seen to counsel her while they are on cases. However, Jordan has clashed several times with Unit Chief Aaron Hotchner. She eventually leaves when she decides she can't handle the stress that comes with her job.
- Diana Reid (Jane Lynch; Seasons 1–2, 4, 12, 15), the mother of BAU team member Dr. Spencer Reid. Like her son, she has a high IQ. She was once a university professor of literature, but has schizophrenia and is hospitalized in a Las Vegas sanitarium, where Spencer committed her when he was 18. Her husband, William Reid, left prior to her diagnosis because of his inability to cope with her illness, and he could not deal with protecting her after she witnessed a murder. She is functional when on her medication, but frequently lapses into regression to her university career. Diana spent much time reading aloud to Spencer while he was growing up, and he continues to write her a letter every day. She is proud of her son but disapproves of the FBI, as it is a government-run organization; she refers to his colleagues as "fascists". She seems to be showing signs of improvement in later episodes, when Reid states that she went on a supervised field trip to the Grand Canyon without feeling the need to notify him. However, she did not forget him, with Reid later receiving a postcard and a gift from her.
- William LaMontagne Jr. (Josh Stewart; Seasons 2–5, 7–9, 11–16) is SSA Jennifer Jareau's husband and the father of Jennifer's sons, Henry and Michael. Will and Jennifer met while she was working a case in his hometown. As of early season 4, Will had moved to Virginia and is a stay-at-home dad for Henry until he became a detective for the Metropolitan Police Department (Washington D.C.) as shown in the season 7 finale ("Run"). It is also stated that the couple had made a deal that in a life-threatening situation, they would do everything so that one of them could live to look after Henry. Jennifer accepted his marriage proposal and they were married officially; however, when their son was born, they exchanged rings with insets of Henry's birthstone, citrine. He is seen briefly in the 100th episode getting medicine for Henry with Jennifer, as well as the episode "The Slave of Duty" (season 5), accompanying Jennifer and the team at Haley Hotchner's funeral. In the season 7 finale, Will works alongside JJ to stop the bank robbers and is eventually taken hostage. Afterward, they agree to get married and unknowingly attend a surprise wedding ceremony thrown by Rossi and Will.
- Kevin Lynch (Nicholas Brendon; Seasons 3–10) first appears in the episode "Penelope" (season 3), in which he is required to search Penelope Garcia's computer to learn who shot her. Kevin sends the team live video alerting that the unsub (unknown subject) is in the BAU headquarters. He is intensely impressed by Penelope's computer skills, and the feeling is mutual. At the end of the episode, Penelope is introduced to Kevin, and the two become romantically involved. In the episode "I Love You, Tommy Brown" (season 7), Kevin proposes to Penelope, but she turns him down, saying that "things are going too fast", and ultimately the couple break up.
- Mateo Cruz (Esai Morales; Seasons 9–10) takes over from the late Erin Strauss as the new BAU section chief in season 9. He has a past working relationship with JJ. It was revealed in "200" that the two had worked on a task force together in the Middle East. He was the only person to know of her pregnancy and miscarriage during her time on the task force. In the same episode, they are both kidnapped by Tivon Askari (Faran Tahir), who was a traitor within the task force. They are both physically and mentally tortured into giving the access codes given to them during the mission. He is shocked to discover that Michael Hastings (Tahmoh Penikett), one of the men with whom they had worked on the task force, was the mastermind behind the plan and threatened to rape JJ to give him the access codes. He gives in and is later stabbed by Askari, who is quickly killed by Hotch. Cruz is taken to the hospital following the incident and is believed to be alive. Several episodes later, he reappears in the season 9 finale, "Angels" and "Demons", when he asks the team to investigate a case brought to him by his friend Peter Coleman, the sheriff of Briscoe County, Texas. They first arrive to investigate a series of murders involving prostitutes, but as they investigate, the team soon finds that they are caught in a ring of corrupt deputies—ironically the only officer not involved being Sheriff Coleman—and find their lives in danger. After a fatal shootout with the corrupt, drug-peddling Preacher Mills (Brett Cullen), Sheriff Coleman is killed, Morgan is wounded, and Reid is critically wounded and hospitalized as a result. Distraught by this turn of events, Cruz travels to Texas with Garcia to help the team investigate and apprehend the ring leader, Deputy Owen McGregor (Michael Trucco). He is not seen again until late in season 10 (episode 19, "Beyond Borders") when he needs the BAU to help the FBI's international team, led by Jack Garrett (Gary Sinise), to catch an unsub who has kidnapped a family while on vacation in Barbados. The case is especially critical because this unsub has eluded both the domestic and international BAU teams by killing a family in Aruba, then in Florida one year later. This episode was the backdoor pilot for the upcoming spinoff, titled Criminal Minds: Beyond Borders. He has not been seen since.
- Savannah Morgan (née Hayes) (Rochelle Aytes; Seasons 9–11) is Derek Morgan's wife. She works as a doctor at Bethesda General Hospital. Savannah first appeared in Season 9's "The Return", and it is presumed that Morgan and Savannah started dating prior to Season 9 and first met after she approached him when he was depressed over a case that ended badly. Before they started dating, they used to be neighbors. She was introduced to the show because Shemar Moore, the actor who portrays Morgan, requested that his character get a romantic partner.
- Joy Struthers (Amber Stevens; Seasons 10–11, 14) is Rossi's daughter from his short-lived second marriage to French diplomat Hayden Montgomery. When they divorced, Hayden didn't tell him she was pregnant, and Joy thought her father was her mother's second husband, who finally told her the truth before dying from cancer. In the episode, "Fate" (10x09), Joy seeks Rossi out and they're getting to know each other. Joy is a reporter and true-crime writer and is married. She has a two-year-old son named Kai.
- Kristy Simmons (Kelly Frye; Seasons 13–15) is Matt Simmons' wife, and the mother of his four (later five) children.

== Reception ==
The first season of Criminal Minds received mixed reviews from critics. It has a Metacritic score of 42 based on 21 reviews, indicating "mixed or average reviews". Dorothy Rabinowitz said, in her review for The Wall Street Journal, "From the evidence of the first few episodes, Criminal Minds may be a hit, and deservedly" and gave particular praise to Gubler and Patinkin's performances. Ned Martel in The New York Times was less positive, saying, "The problem with Criminal Minds is its many confusing maladies, applied to too many characters." The reviewer felt that "as a result, the cast seems like a spilled trunk of broken toys, with which the audience—and perhaps the creators—may quickly become bored." The Chicago Tribune reviewer, Sid Smith, felt that the show "may well be worth a look", though he too criticized the "confusing plots and characters". Writing in PopMatters, Marco Lanzagorta criticized the show after its premiere, saying it "confuses critical thinking with supernatural abilities" and that its characters conform to stereotypes. In the Los Angeles Times, Mary McNamara gave a similar review, and praised Patinkin and Gubler's performances.

Gillian Flynn said, in her review for Entertainment Weekly for the second season, "Like every procedural crime series of late, Minds is stocked with weary, overworked detective types. But here they also seem bored, bitter, and unengaged." Ross Ruediger, had a more positive review, in his review for Bullz-Eye.com, he said, "The producers and writers deserve major kudos for developing a strategy for keeping the show on the air without dumbing it down, and the second season of Criminal Minds sets a higher bar for this type of network series." He praised the show for not repeating its themes, and highlighted Matthew Gray Gubler's performance as the usual standout of the show. He also mentioned the performances from the rest of the cast, saying, "There isn't a weak performer in the BAU ensemble."

Bruce Simmons said, in his review for Screen Rant of the third season, "Last season, they started showing both sides of the equation ... It took some of the fun out of wondering who or what, but they made up for it with decent character interaction and development, and there were many last season." Cynthia Fuchs, in her review for PopMatters, focuses on the character David Rossi's, played by Joe Mantegna, addition to the show. In her review, she said, "[Criminal Minds] needs signs of effort, gritty character work rather than shorthand "traits" ripped off from other shows (how many times have you seen the enticing oddball researcher or the socially inept genius?) It's tempting to think Patinkin was tired of the same-old. Rossi's traditional earnestness and self-reliance, his recklessness and self-doubt, might juice this too-slick series into a semblance of originality, even relevance." She explained how she thought the addition of his character could shake up the formula of Criminal Minds, giving it a more interesting angle. She rated the season a 6 out of 10.

Todd R. Ramlow, in his review for PopMatters, criticized the fourth season's depiction of Islam, saying that the "manipulation of racial assumptions and liberal guilt" is problematic, aligning themselves with the principle that if someone looks like a terrorist, then they are a terrorist. He criticizes the season for "further linking Islam to a so called 'culture of death', as opposed to the 'culture of life' seemingly celebrated by the Christian West". He said, "It's unfortunate that even when the architects of the 'global war on terror' have changed their phrasing and perhaps their presumptions, Criminal Minds steps back in with such absolutism." He rated the season a 4/10. Will Harris, in his review for Bullz-Eye.com, focuses on the performances of the guest stars, citing how the opportunity to play villains within the show brings out some of their best acting performances. He said, "There's clearly something about playing a bad guy on Criminal Minds that brings out the best in the show's guest stars, as some of the season's best episodes come courtesy of one-off performances by recognizable faces who have taken on that very challenge. Luke Perry plays a deluded cult leader, Mitch Pileggi plays a 'normal' guy who snaps after a personal tragedy and turns into a killer, and Alex O'Loughlin is a murderer with enough of a conscience to leave messages at his crime scenes asking for help."

Anthony Ocasio, in his review for Screen Rant, focused on Aaron Hotchner's storyline, which was one of the main points of the fifth season. He stated the episode "100", which was also the show's 100th episode, was "amazing" and said, "The whole angle about Hotchner never being able to see his son again was pretty intense. I can't believe they went in that direction with it. It's something I wasn't expecting ... at all." However, he heavily criticized the season's finale, citing that it was flat from the beginning and had a poor cliffhanger. He said, "The fifth season finale of Criminal Minds was terrible, at best. Even an amazing guest star like Tim Curry was unable to save this lack-luster 'cliffhanger'."

Darragh McManus of The Guardian gave the sixth season a positive review, saying that Criminal Minds was only getting better with each season. They said that despite the fact that it was not groundbreaking or new, it was still thoroughly entertaining: "Season six has since settled into the groove nicely, with two excellent subsequent episodes rinsing out memories of Toothy Tim. [The episode] 'J.J.' had a tense plot, almost like a play, centered on two Leopold and Loeb types, and a touching denouement as the titular agent took her leave, while [the episode which aired] last Friday, 'Remembrance Of Things Past', was grueling and gruesome, and scarier than usual, with the team tracking down a killer come out of retirement – a residual nightmare from Rossi's past." Steve Marsi, in his review for TV Fanatic, said that the season was overall good, rating it a 4 out of 5, but cited casting issues. He praised A.J. Cook's performance as the "performance of a lifetime" and lamented her departure from the show that season. He said, "It's a shame that 'The Longest Night' marked a career high point for Jennifer Jereau, a character who just delivered so strongly, only to be shown the door next week. Was this CBS' way of sending her off on a high note? If so, it worked in a sense. She was great. But it made us even more confused and sad about Cook's departure."

Renatta Selliti, in her review for TV Fanatic, gave the seventh season a positive review with a 5 out of 5 rating, and said, "What's equally compelling as the profiling aspect on a show like Criminal Minds is the personal connection between the characters, and this group has it pitch perfect." She praised the season's writing and memorable moments such as Prentiss' return, stating that it created emotional scenes that kept viewers engaged, saying, "Moments like these are what primetime television viewers live for." Anthony Ocasio, in his review for Screen Rant, also had a positive review. He said that the storyline which focused on Emily Prentiss' fake death, and the aftermath of such, was a new format that while it was not the representation of a good Criminal Minds case, it was refreshing from the usual case of the week approach. He stated that each character got their moment to shine, and the writing resulted in compelling character moments. Specifically, he praised Matthew Gray Gubler's performance, especially in the judiciary meeting scene, and said, "The moment where the Senator stated, 'Calm down, Mr. Reid,' and Gubler replied, 'I am calm - and its doctor,' may very well be one of the best performances of a line in the history of the series." Finally, he stated the season wrapped up well, and said, "Of course they're going to be fine. Of course nobody from the team is going to be permanently suspended. But that doesn't mean the manner in which we came to this resolution wasn't appropriately earned, or deserved."

Douglas Wolf, in his review for TV Fanatic, gave the eighth season a positive review with a 5 out of 5 rating. He focused particularly on the two-part finale, which featured Mark Hamill, saying: "The Criminal Minds two-part finale left me on the edge of my seat, earning a perfect rating and leaving my jaw hanging open in shock. ... I didn't realize the depth of his commitment to Strauss, nor was I aware that he was pretty much cheering in her corner as she obtained her medallion for one year of sobriety. The writing around the relationship of these two was compelling and real - and so his agony over her death, and especially about how it would affect her kids, was compelling."

== Broadcast and ratings ==
In 2016, a study by The New York Times of the 50 TV shows with the most Facebook Likes found that "like several of the other police procedurals", Criminal Minds "is more popular in rural areas, particularly in the southeastern half of the country. It hits peak popularity in Alabama and rural Tennessee and is least popular in Santa Barbara, Calif."

Viewership and ratings per season of Criminal Minds
Season	Timeslot (ET)	Episodes	First aired		Last aired		TV season	Viewership rank	Avg. viewers (millions)
Season	Timeslot (ET)	Episodes	Date	Viewers (millions)	Date	Viewers (millions)	TV season	Viewership rank	Avg. viewers (millions)
1	Wednesday 9:00 pm	22	September 22, 2005	19.57	May 10, 2006	12.67	2005–06	28	12.63
2	Wednesday 9:00 pm	23	September 20, 2006	15.65	May 16, 2007	13.21	2006–07	24	14.05
3	Wednesday 9:00 pm	20	September 26, 2007	12.66	May 21, 2008	13.15	2007–08	24	12.78
4	Wednesday 9:00 pm	26	September 24, 2008	17.01	May 20, 2009	13.99	2008–09	11	14.95
5	Wednesday 9:00 pm	23	September 23, 2009	15.84	May 26, 2010	12.97	2009–10	16	13.70
6	Wednesday 9:00 pm	24	September 22, 2010	14.13	May 18, 2011	12.84	2010–11	10	14.11
7	Wednesday 9:00 pm	24	September 21, 2011	14.14	May 16, 2012	13.68	2011–12	15	13.20
8	Wednesday 9:00 pm	24	September 26, 2012	11.73	May 22, 2013	11.01	2012–13	20	12.15
9	Wednesday 9:00 pm	24	September 25, 2013	11.27	May 14, 2014	12.03	2013–14	12	12.66
10	Wednesday 9:00 pm	23	October 1, 2014	11.74	May 6, 2015	9.61	2014–15	11	14.11
11	Wednesday 9:00 pm	22	September 30, 2015	10.08	May 4, 2016	8.84	2015–16	16	12.20
12	Wednesday 9:00 pm	22	September 28, 2016	8.92	May 10, 2017	8.12	2016–17	20	10.86
13	Wednesday 10:00 pm	22	September 27, 2017	7.00	April 18, 2018	5.39	2017–18	29	9.58
14	Wednesday 10:00 pm	15	October 3, 2018	4.45	February 6, 2019	4.72	2018–19	41	8.22
15	Wednesday 9:00 pm	10	January 8, 2020	4.82	February 19, 2020	5.36	2019–20	34	8.01

- Note: The series premiere episode aired outside of its regular day and time at Thursday 10:00 p.m.

The series is in syndication on the A&E Network and Ion Television, as well as on We TV, Sundance TV, and Pop. Early seasons of the show have also begun airing on Rewind Networks's HITS TV channel in Southeast Asia, Hong Kong, and Taiwan.

All episodes are available to stream on Paramount+ in the United States and on Disney+ in Canada. The series, which ABC Signature co-produces while also handle worldwide distribution, is available on Disney+'s Star content hub with all 16 seasons in selected territories.

== Franchise ==
=== Criminal Minds: Evolution continuation ===
The series originally culminated after its fifteenth season on February 19, 2020. In February 2021, a revival of the series was in early development at Paramount+, with a 10-episode revival officially greenlit. This change modified the show's format to better fit into a more serialized arc, preferred by streaming modern audiences. It was announced to still be in development by the time of the Television Critics Association winter press tour in February 2022. In July 2022, Paramount+ officially gave the revival a full season order. The main cast of the previous seasons would return, with the absence of Daniel Henney and Matthew Gray Gubler (the latter of whom has been with the series since the first episode). The season began filming in August 2022.

In January 2023, Paramount+ renewed Evolution for a second season. In May 2023, CBS Home Entertainment announced that Evolution would be released to Blu-ray and DVD on June 20, 2023; with the home release officially dubbing it the "sixteenth season" of the series overall.

Showrunner Erica Messer confirmed that all main characters from the sixteenth season will be returning for the seventeenth: filming began in January 2024, and the 10-episode season premiered on June 6. On June 5, Criminal Minds was renewed for an eighteenth season, which premiered on May 8, 2025 and consisted of ten episodes. In March 2025, Criminal Minds was renewed for a nineteenth season, which premiered on May 28, 2026. In March 2026, ahead of the release of the nineteenth season, the series was renewed for a twentieth season (the fifth Evolution season), which is set to premiere in 2027. On October 30, 2026, it was announced that the upcoming season will be the final season.

=== Criminal Minds: Suspect Behavior ===
The Season 5 episode, "The Fight", introduced a second BAU team and launched a series called Criminal Minds: Suspect Behavior. The spin-off series debuted February 16, 2011, on CBS but was canceled after a short 13-episode season owing to low ratings. On September 6, 2011, CBS DVD released The Complete Series on a four-disc set. It was packaged as "The DVD Edition".

The cast features Forest Whitaker as the lead role of Sam Cooper; including Janeane Garofalo, Michael Kelly, Beau Garrett, Matt Ryan, Richard Schiff, and Kirsten Vangsness, who reprises her role as Penelope Garcia from the original series.

=== Criminal Minds: Beyond Borders ===
A proposed new series in the Criminal Minds franchise to be named Criminal Minds: Beyond Borders was announced in January 2015. Former CSI: NY star Gary Sinise (who is also a producer on the show) and Anna Gunn were cast in the lead roles of Jack Garrett and Lily Lambert, though the latter departed after the backdoor pilot. Tyler James Williams was cast as Russ "Monty" Montgomery and Daniel Henney as Matt Simmons, with Alana de la Garza as Clara Seger and Annie Funke as Mae Jarvis further being cast as series regulars.

The series follows the FBI agents of the International Response Team (IRT) helping American citizens who are in trouble abroad. CBS aired a backdoor pilot on April 8, 2015, in the Criminal Minds slot, with a crossover episode titled "Beyond Borders". The second spin-off series debuted March 16, 2016, on CBS. On May 16, 2016, CBS renewed the series for a second season. On May 14, 2017, CBS canceled the series after two seasons due to low ratings.

=== The Real Criminal Minds ===
In addition to Evolution, a true-crime docuseries titled The Real Criminal Minds was ordered by Paramount+. The series will feature a real former FBI profiler and examine real cases and real behavior, illustrated by clips from the fictional Criminal Minds series.

=== South Korean adaptation ===
In 2017, tvN launched their own Korean version of Criminal Minds. The episodes are based on the original American version after its third season. On the cast is Lee Joon-gi as Kim Hyun-joon (Derek Morgan), Moon Chae Won as Ha Sun-woo (Emily Prentiss), Son Hyun-joo as Kang Ki-hyung (Aaron Hotchner), Yoo Sun as Nana Hwang (Penelope Garcia), Lee Sun-bin as Yoo Min-young (Jennifer Jareau), and Go Yoon as Lee Han (Spencer Reid). The episodes are an hour-long.

=== Video games ===
CBS announced in October 2009 that Legacy Interactive would develop a video game based on the show. The game would require players to examine crime scenes for clues to help solve murder mysteries. The interactive puzzle game was released in 2012, but the show's cast was not involved with the project so it did not feature any of their voices. The second game, developed by Tilting Point, was released on November 20, 2018, for Android and iOS devices.

== Awards and nominations ==
In January 2017, Criminal Minds won the Best TV Crime Drama award at the People’s Choice Awards.

Year	Award	Category	Nominee(s)	Result
2006	People's Choice Awards	Favorite New Television Drama	Criminal Minds	Nominated
2006	Hollywood Post Alliance	Outstanding Editing – Television	Jimmy Giritlian	Nominated
2006	ASCAP Film and Television Music Awards	Top TV Series	Marc Fantini, Steffan Fantini, Scott Gordon	Won
2007	ASCAP Film and Television Music Awards	Top TV Series	Marc Fantini, Steffan Fantini, Scott Gordon	Won
2008	Motion Picture Sound Editors	Best Sound Editing – Music for Short Form Television	Lisa A. Arpino; For episode "True Night"	Nominated
2008	BMI Film & TV Awards	BMI TV Music Award	Mark Mancina	Won
2008	Primetime Emmy Awards	Outstanding Stunt Coordination	Tom Elliott; For episode "Tabula Rasa"	Nominated
2009	BMI Film & TV Awards	BMI TV Music Award	Mark Mancina	Won
2009	Primetime Emmy Awards	Outstanding Stunt Coordination	Tom Elliott; For episode "Normal"	Nominated
2010	Hollywood Music In Media Awards (HMMA)	Best Score in a TV Show	Marc Fantini, Steffan Fantini, Scott Gordon	Won
2010	ASCAP Film and Television Music Awards	Top Television Series	Steffan Fantini	Won
2011	People's Choice Awards	Favorite TV Crime Drama	Criminal Minds	Nominated
2011	Image Awards	Outstanding Writing in a Dramatic Series	Janine Sherman Barrois; For episode "Remembrance of Things Past"	Nominated
2011	ASCAP Film and Television Music Awards	Top Television Series	Steffan Fantini	Won
2012	People's Choice Awards	Favorite TV Crime Drama	Criminal Minds	Nominated
2012	Image Awards	Outstanding Writing in a Dramatic Series	Janine Sherman Barrois; For episode "The Bittersweet Science"	Nominated
2012	ASCAP Film and Television Music Awards	Top Television Series	Steffan Fantini	Won
2012	Primetime Emmy Awards	Outstanding Stunt Coordination	Tom Elliott; For episode "The Bittersweet Science"	Nominated
2013	People's Choice Awards	Favorite TV Crime Drama	Criminal Minds	Nominated
2013	MovieGuide Awards	Faith and Freedom Award	Criminal Minds; For episode "The Fallen"	Nominated
2013	Image Awards	Outstanding Writing in a Dramatic Series	Janine Sherman Barrois; For episode "The Pact"	Nominated
2013	BMI Film & TV Awards	BMI TV Music Award	Mark Mancina	Won
2013	ASCAP Film and Television Music Awards	Top Television Series	Marc Fantini, Steffan Fantini, Scott Gordon	Won
2014	People's Choice Awards	Favorite TV Crime Drama	Criminal Minds	Nominated
2014	Image Awards	Outstanding Writing in a Dramatic Series	Janine Sherman Barrois; For episode "Strange Fruit"	Won
2014	Image Awards	Outstanding Actor in a Drama Series	Shemar Moore	Nominated
2014	Image Awards	Outstanding Directing in a Drama Series	Rob Hardy; For episode "Carbon Copy"	Nominated
2015	People's Choice Awards	Favorite TV Crime Drama	Criminal Minds	Nominated
2015	People's Choice Awards	Favorite TV Crime Drama Actor	Shemar Moore	Nominated
2015	Prism Awards	Drama Episode – Mental Health	Criminal Minds; For episode "The Edge of Winter"	Nominated
2015	Monte-Carlo TV Festival	International TV Audience Award – Best Drama TV Series	Touchstone Television, The Mark Gordon Company	Nominated
2015	Image Awards	Outstanding Actor in a Drama Series	Shemar Moore	Won
2015	Image Awards	Outstanding Directing in a Drama Series	Hanelle Culpepper; For episode "The Edge of Winter"	Nominated
2016	People's Choice Awards	Favorite TV Crime Drama	Criminal Minds	Nominated
2016	People's Choice Awards	Favorite TV Crime Drama Actor	Shemar Moore	Nominated
2017	People's Choice Awards	Favorite TV Crime Drama	Criminal Minds	Won
