= Alana de la Garza =

American actress (born 1976)

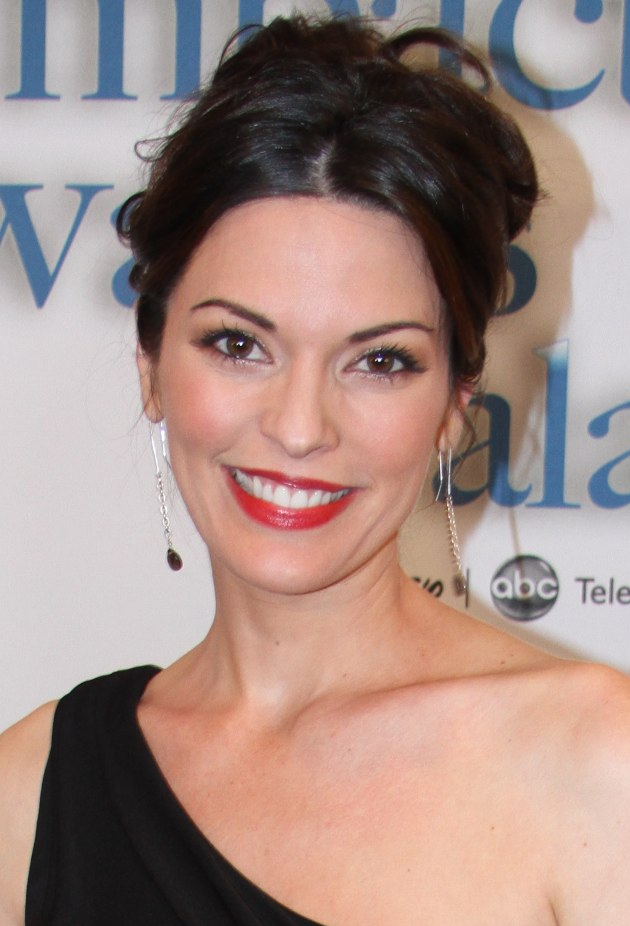
- De la Garza at the 16th Annual Impact Awards Gala in February 2013
- Born: June 18, 1976 (age 50); Columbus, Ohio, U.S.
- Occupations: Actress, model
- Years active: 1999–present
- Spouse: Michael Roberts (m. 2008)
- Children: 2

Alana de la Garza (born June 18, 1976) is an American actress. She is known for her roles as Connie Rubirosa for the final four seasons of the initial run of the NBC television series Law & Order, as well as in the spinoffs Law & Order: LA and Law & Order: Special Victims Unit. She also portrayed Marisol Delko-Caine on CSI: Miami. In 2014 and 2015, she starred as Detective Jo Martinez in the ABC series Forever. From 2016 to 2017, she starred in Criminal Minds: Beyond Borders as Special Agent Clara Seger. In 2019, she began starring as SAC Isobel Castille on FBI, a role she also plays on the spin-off series FBI: Most Wanted and CIA.

== Early life ==
De la Garza was born in Columbus, Ohio, to a Mexican-American father and an Irish-American mother. She was raised in El Paso, Texas.

She won the "Miss Photogenic" title in the Miss El Paso Teen USA local beauty pageant. She became a special needs teacher and enrolled at the University of Texas at El Paso, studying physical therapy and social work.

After graduation, she landed some small roles while living in Orlando, Florida, then soon after moved to New York City.

== Career ==
In 2001, she was featured in the music video for Brooks & Dunn's song "Ain't Nothing 'bout You". De la Garza also appeared in the music video "All or Nothing" released by the boy band O-Town in 2001. She obtained the role of Rosa Santos on the soap opera All My Children and guest-starring roles in JAG, Charmed, Two and a Half Men, and Las Vegas. She starred as Maria in the short-lived television series The Mountain. In 2006, she starred in Mr. Fix-It, co-starring David Boreanaz. She also guest-starred as an evil Kryptonian (named "Aethyr" in promotional materials) in the Season 5 premiere episode of Smallville and played the recurring role of Marisol Delko Caine on the CBS television series CSI: Miami. She has twice been featured in the "Girls of Maxim" online gallery.

In 2006, she joined the cast of NBC's Law & Order during the premiere of Season 17, portraying Assistant District Attorney Connie Rubirosa. Her performance as ADA Rubirosa has been widely praised by critics. In 2007, she earned a nomination for "Best Supporting Actress—Television" by the Imagen Foundation Awards. Following in 2008, she was nominated for an ALMA Award as "Outstanding Supporting Actress in a Drama Television Series". Later that year, she garnered an "Impact Award" for "Outstanding Performance in a Dramatic Television Series" by the National Hispanic Media Coalition.

De la Garza played Assistant District Attorney (later DDA) Rubirosa for the final four seasons of Law & Order, a role she also played on the short-lived spin-off Law & Order: LA (2011). On January 22, 2014, she guest starred in an episode of Law & Order: Special Victims Unit as Connie Rubirosa. Rubirosa, who had recently departed the Los Angeles District Attorney's Office, is now a federal prosecutor, heading up a joint task force on underage sex trafficking. This is, to date, her final appearance in the franchise.

In July 2011, de la Garza reprised her role as Marisol Delko Caine, on CSI: Miami's season 10 premiere.

In February 2012, she was cast as a lead in the NBC medical drama pilot Do No Harm. She played Dr. Lena Solis, a neurologist. In June 2012, de la Garza was added to the cast of Are You Here, the feature film debut of Mad Men creator Matthew Weiner.

In 2014–2015, she co-starred as police detective Jo Martinez in the ABC television series Forever. In September 2015, she began a recurring role as the new head of Homeland Security on Scorpion. She appeared in Criminal Minds: Beyond Borders, starring as the female-lead opposite Gary Sinise. In 2019, she was cast in season two of FBI as Isobel Castille.

== Personal life ==
De la Garza married her longtime boyfriend, Michael Roberts, a writer, on May 31, 2008, in Orlando, Orange County, Florida. They have a son and a daughter. She is a distant cousin of TV writer-producer René Balcer, sharing a common relative in Juan Cortina, a Mexican folk hero known as the "Rio Grande Robin Hood".

== Filmography ==
=== Film ===
Year	Title	Role	Notes
2002	Bending All the Rules	Woman ordering shots	
2004	El segundo	Delicia	
2005	Mr. Dramatic	Mrs. Dramatic	Short film
2006	Mr. Fix It	Sophia	
2013	Are You Here	Victoria Riolobos	

=== Television ===
Year	Title	Role	Notes
1999	Mortal Kombat: Conquest	Ella	Episode: "Twisted Truths"
2001	All My Children	Rosa Santos #2	Recurring role
2003	JAG	Maria Elena	Episode: "A Tangled Webb: Part 2"
2003	Las Vegas	Shelly	Episode: "Pros and Cons"
2004	Two and a Half Men	Crystal	Episode: "No Sniffing, No Wowing"
2004–2005	The Mountain	Maria Serrano	Main cast
2005	Smallville	Aethyr	Episode: "Arrival"
2005	Charmed	Sylvia	Episode: "Desperate Housewitches"
2005–2011	CSI: Miami	Marisol Delko	Recurring role
2006	The Book of Daniel	Jessie Gilmore	Recurring role
2006–2010	Law & Order	ADA Connie Rubirosa	Main cast (seasons 17–20)
2011	Law & Order: LA	DDA Connie Rubirosa	Main cast
2012	NCIS: Los Angeles	Diane Dunross	Episode: "Partners"
2012	Deadly Hope	Joanne Connors	TV movie
2012	Single Ladies	Nicolette	Episode: "The Business of Friendship"
2013	Do No Harm	Dr. Lena Solis	Main cast
2014	Law & Order: Special Victims Unit	AUSA Connie Rubirosa	Episode: "Jersey Breakdown"
2014–2015	Forever	Jo Martinez	Main cast
2015	Scorpion	Adriana Molina	3 episodes
2016–2017	Criminal Minds: Beyond Borders	SSA Clara Seger	Main cast
2017	Criminal Minds	SSA Clara Seger	Episode: "Spencer"
2018	Chiefs		TV movie
2019–present	FBI	SAC Isobel Castille	1 episode (season 1); main cast (seasons 2–present)
2020–2025	FBI: Most Wanted	SAC Isobel Castille	15 episodes
2020–2021	The FBI Declassified	Narrator	Documentary series
2021–2023	FBI: International	SAC Isobel Castille	3 episodes
2026	CIA	SAC Isobel Castille	Episode: "Elimination Game"
