= Annie Funke =

American actress

- Born: April 9, 1985 (age 41); Edmond, Oklahoma, U.S.
- Occupation: Actress
- Years active: 2001–present

Annie Funke (born April 9, 1985) is an American actress. She starred as FBI Supervisory Special Agent and Medical Examiner Mae Jarvis on the CBS crime drama series Criminal Minds: Beyond Borders.

== Early life ==
Funke was born in Edmond, Oklahoma. She graduated from University of Oklahoma in 2007 and earned her Bachelor of Fine Arts (BFA) in musical theater from the University of Oklahoma. She later graduated from the Steppenwolf Theatre Company in Chicago in 2011.

== Career ==
Funke's career has mostly been on the stage. She was featured in the off-Broadway hit “Punk Rock” and she has starred opposite Jake Gyllenhaal in the Roundabout Theater's If There Is I Haven't Found It Yet. Her additional theater credits include the Broadway production of Hairspray and the San Francisco production of Wicked. Her first professional acting job was at age 16, as Jan in Grease at the Lyric Theatre in Oklahoma City. Funke broke onto the entertainment scene in the critically acclaimed film A Most Violent Year in 2014. On July 17, 2015, it was announced that Funke had been cast in the CBS crime drama series Criminal Minds: Beyond Borders as SSA and Medical Examiner Mae Jarvis.

== Filmography ==
=== Film ===
Year	Title	Role	Notes
2014	A Most Violent Year	Lorraine Lefkowitz	
2015	The Intern	ATF Creative Team	
2015	Death and Cupcakes	Whitney Winter Rodgers	Short film
2023	The Mattachine Family	Laura	

=== Television ===
Year	Title	Role	Notes
2014	The Affair	Hotel Clerk	2 episodes
2015	LFE	Chelsi	Film
2016–2017	Criminal Minds: Beyond Borders	Mae Jarvis	Series regular
2018	Gone	Trina Hayes	Season 1, episode 10: "Secuestrado"
2018	Chicago Fire	Amanda	Season 6, episode 16: "The One That Matters Most"
