= Flight 112 =

Flight 112 may refer to:

Listed chronologically

- Mohawk Airlines Flight 112, crashed on 2 July 1963
- Aeroflot Flight 112, crashed on 2 January 1965
- Paninternational Flight 112, crashed on 6 September 1971
- Alitalia Flight 112, crashed on 5 May 1972
- Air India Flight 112 plot, a foiled terrorist plot that occurred in May 1986
- Air China Flight 112, one of a number of superspreading events in the global spread of SARS, 15 March 2003
- Pamir Airways Flight 112, crashed on 17 May 2010
- Peruvian Airlines Flight 112, caught fire after landing on 28 March 2017

== See also ==
- STS-112, a successful Space Shuttle mission in October 2002
