= Ari Magder =

Canadian-American actor (1983–2012)

- Born: Ari Joseph Magder; May 3, 1983; Toronto, Ontario, Canada
- Died: April 27, 2012 (aged 28); Los Angeles, California, U.S.
- Resting place: Sholom Memorial Park
- Occupation: Actor
- Years active: 1989–1996
- Known for: Dan Jones on Shining Time Station

Ari Joseph Magder (May 3, 1983 – April 27, 2012) was a Canadian-born American actor best known for Shining Time Station (1989), Rugged Gold (1994) and Woman on Trial: The Lawrencia Bembenek Story (1993, about Laurie Bembenek, starring Tatum O'Neal).

== Early life ==
Ari Magder was born on May 3, 1983, in Toronto, Ontario, Canada. He started acting in 1989 and played Dan Jones in seasons 2 and 3 of Shining Time Station and its first two 1995 specials.

== Filmography ==
Year	Title	Role	Notes
1991-1995	Shining Time Station	Dan Jones	
1993	Bookmice	Jason	
1993	Woman on the Run: The Lawrencia Bembenek Story	Sean Schultz	TV Movie
1993	E.N.G.	Peter Kennedy	2 episodes
1993	Tales from the Cryptkeeper	Randy (voice)	1 episode
1994	Rugged Gold	Lloyd Henderson	TV Movie
1996	Don't Look Back	Young Morgan	Film; final role

== Death ==
Ari died from complications of pneumonia on April 27, 2012, in Los Angeles, California. He is interred at Sholom Memorial Park.
