= CA-112 =

CA112 can refer to:

- Air China Flight 112
- California State Route 112
