= Jane Brucker =

American actress

- Occupation: Actress
- Years active: 1986–2010
- Spouses: Brian O'Connor (m. 1986; div. 1993) Raul Vega (m. 2001)
- Children: 2

Jane Brucker is an American actress best known for playing the part of Lisa Houseman, Baby's elder sister in the hit 1987 film Dirty Dancing.

== Life and career ==
Brucker studied theater at the North Carolina School of the Arts, and worked with the improv group, First Amendment, in New York. One of her classmates was Bruce Willis.

She was married to actor Brian O'Connor from 1986 to 1993. Their daughter, Sally O'Connor, was born in 1989. In November 2001 she wed photographer Raul Vega; they have a daughter, Rachel, born in 2003.

Brucker co-wrote the song "Hula Hana" that her character Lisa sings during the show rehearsal in Dirty Dancing. She appeared in season 1 episode 14 of the television program Wiseguy.

== Filmography ==
=== Film & TV ===
Year	Title	Role	Notes
1986	One Life to Live	Maggie Delakian	3 episodes
1986	Miami Vice	Angela Mitchell	1 episode
1987	Dirty Dancing	Lisa Houseman	
1987–1988	Crime Story	Delores	3 episodes
1988	Wiseguy	Jacqueline Devries	1 episode
1988	Stealing Home	Sheryl	
1989	Bloodhounds of Broadway	Charlotte	
1989	Doctor Doctor	Elizabeth McQueen	4 episodes
2001	Wedding Album		short
2005	Dishdogz	Kevin's mom	
2009	Holding for Miss Kiley	Miss Kiley	short
2010	Bright Day	Jane	
