= List of Doctor Doctor (American TV series) episodes =

This is a list of episodes for the CBS television series Doctor Doctor.

== Series overview ==
Season	Episodes	Originally released	
Season	Episodes	First released	Last released
1	6	June 12, 1989	July 24, 1989
2	15	November 13, 1989	August 27, 1990
3	19	September 19, 1990	July 6, 1991

== Episodes ==
=== Season 1 (1989) ===
No. overall	No. in season	Title	Directed by	Written by	Original release date	Prod. code	U.S. viewers (millions)	Rating/share (households)
1	1	"The Search for Armand Peltzer"	Norman Steinberg	Norman Steinberg	June 12, 1989	607-201	17.0	12.1/23
Amid the pressures of growing friction with his partners, an overcrowded waiting room, a TV promo for his new novel, and an unhappy girlfriend, Mike tries to locate a runaway patient.
2	2	"The Palumbo Affair"	John Whitesell	Norman Steinberg	June 19, 1989	607-202	13.4	10.4/19
Mike has problems reconciling his medical methods, such as house calls, with his father and his partners, which puts his part of the partnership in critical condition.
3	3	"Running on M.D."	John Whitesell	David Frankel	June 26, 1989	607-203	12.6	9.4/17
Mike's novel Panacea gets rave reviews but doesn't sell, and his first day as a TV doctor is marred by an incident involving a jelly doughnut and the Heimlich maneuver. Mike's try at practicing on his own gets a slow start.
4	4	"The M.D. Nest Syndrome"	John Whitesell	David Frankel	July 10, 1989	607-204	13.1	9.7/17
While having a heart attack, Mike's landlord persuades him to buy the house his apartment is in. Mike's TV career continues to get a shaky start, as does getting back with the partners.
5	5	"The Murtagh Conundrum"	Norman Steinberg	Norman Steinberg	July 17, 1989	607-206	15.1	10.8/20
Deirdre asks Mike to make a house call on a very uncooperative patient, who turns out to be her estranged father. Meanwhile, Grant prepares for a guest spot on Mike's morning show segment.
6	6	"Patients Are a Virtue"	John Whitesell	David Frankel	July 24, 1989	607-205	15.3	11.0/21
Mike's mother responds well as a nurse in his office, but the arrangement has a bad effect on his father, who wants her back at home.

=== Season 2 (1989–90) ===
No. overall	No. in season	Title	Directed by	Written by	Original release date	Prod. code	U.S. viewers (millions)
7	1	"Pediatricks"	Michael Lembeck	Paul Attanasio	November 13, 1989	607-207	13.4
Mike looks after Abe's son for a weekend and helps to rewrite some important laws that Abe had laid down. Grant looks to find a family for Yom Kippur.
8	2	"Member of the Club"	Norman Steinberg	Timothy Stack	November 20, 1989	607-209	13.5
Grant discovers that his membership into an exclusive country club proves to be "exclusive" in a colorless way.
9	3	"Smooth Operator"	John Whitesell	Ron Burla	November 27, 1989	607-210	13.0
Mike and Grant have a falling out when Grant pushes surgery for Mike's elderly friend and the man dies during the operation. Deirdre insists she can tame Abe's son's unruly dog.
10	4	"Bachelor Doctor"	Michael Lembeck	David Blum, Terri Minsky	December 4, 1989	607-208	15.9
Being listed as the fourth most eligible bachelor in Providence makes Mike a sudden winner in the dating game, but a loser with his girlfriend and the partnership.
11	5	"Don't Mess with the Elephants"	John Whitesell	Paul Attanasio	December 11, 1989	607-211	15.5
Mike becomes involved with one of his patients, a world-famous photographer. Grant refuses to sign off on an insurance physical examination for Abe unless he reduces his blood cholesterol.
12	6	"Torch Song Cardiology"	John Whitesell	Bill Diamond & Michael Saltzman & Terri Minsky & David Blum	December 18, 1989	607-212	17.4
Mike's gay brother Richard helps Grant write a speech and the two become close friends, forcing Grant to confront his homophobia. Meanwhile, the doctors try to resist a very persuasive medical equipment salesman.
13	7	"Odd Man In"	Norman Steinberg	Roberto Benabib	January 1, 1990	607-213	22.7
A visit from a former medical school classmate triggers a group flashback to when Abe invited brilliant student Mike to join their study group, with predictably disruptive results.
14	8	"Accentuate the Positive"	David Frankel	David Frankel	January 8, 1990	607-214	18.3
Mike can't understand Deirdre's extremely negative reaction upon learning that her patient, Wake Up Providence host Hugh Persons, is HIV-positive... until she confesses her fear that she may also be infected.
15	9	"Doctors and Other Strangers"	Richard Dubin	David Blum & Terri Minsky	January 15, 1990	607-215	16.9
Abe thinks he's having marriage problems, but in truth his wife has a problem she fears will disrupt his "perfect" life; Dierdre becomes a biker's dream chick.
16	10	"Family Affair"	John Whitesell	Jonathan Feldman	January 29, 1990	607-216	14.0
Mike's Aunt Laura, a high-profile plastic surgeon, has a base attraction to Grant, and Grant considers leaving the partnership to join hers.
17	11	"Fetal Attraction"	John Whitesell	Roberto Benabib & Karl Fink	February 5, 1990	607-217	15.5
Mike looks for adoptive parents for a young woman's unborn child, until Dierdre arranges to make herself the mommy.
18	12	"The Love Game"	John Whitesell	Julie Newton	February 19, 1990	607-218	13.3
Mike and Dierdre have a double-date disaster when Dierdre's guy turns out to be the estranged husband of Mike's girl.
19	13	"No Free Lunch"	John Whitesell	Neena Beber	February 26, 1990	607-219	14.6
Mike's TV career bites the dust after he refuses to let a quack doctor with a powder-diet treatment eat up half of his air time; Abe tries painting, with unpalatable results.
20	14	"Night of the Inguinal"	David Frankel	Story by : Hester Kaplan & Michael Eric Stein; Teleplay by : Nick D'Arienzo	August 20, 1990	607-222	13.2
Mike gets a hernia while lifting weights on the morning show, but like any doctor he finds the thought of having surgery utterly unthinkable, so he tries to put it off by leaving the surgery.
21	15	"Who's Zoomin' Who?"	John Whitesell	Roberto Benabib & Karl Fink	August 27, 1990	607-220	15.3
Mike finds attractive a woman that Grant says he is ready to break up with. Mike moves in a little too early, before the official breakup, and this puts a strain on their friendship and the partnership when Grant changes his mind. Abe has nothing but problems with the car Dierdre sold him, so she offers to buy it back.

=== Season 3 (1990–91) ===
No. overall	No. in season	Title	Directed by	Written by	Original release date	Prod. code	U.S. viewers (millions)
22	1	"Ch-Ch-Ch-Changes"	Norman Steinberg	David Frankel, Norman Steinberg	September 19, 1990	607-224	10.6
Mike is against it when the other partners decide to make some changes that will increase business; he feels the patients will lose in the end, and one almost does.
23	2	"Murder, He Wrote"	Robert Berlinger	Joe Toplyn	September 26, 1990	607-225	9.0
Mike may be an accomplice to murder when he tells a mystery writer about an undetectable poison and later he discovers that her husband has died under mysterious circumstances. Dierdre lets Justin's mouse out of its cage.
24	3	"Who's Afraid of Leona Linowitz?"	David Frankel	Roberto Benabib, Karl Fink	October 3, 1990	607-228	9.8
Mike goes on a "date from hell" with Grant's sister, a psychiatrist from Chicago who moves in and unloads some emotional baggage she's been carrying since her marriage fell apart. The Butterfields try for another baby.
25	4	"Making Mr. Right"	Zane Buzby	Martin Rips, Joseph Staretski	October 18, 1990	607-227	13.1
Dierdre falls in love with a wealthy man whom the partners join on a trip to Key West in his private plane. Something goes wrong mid-flight when he has a heart attack while she is keeping him "company" in the cockpit. Abe isn't comfortable with the fact he needs glasses.
26	5	"The Terminator"	James Widdoes	Ron Burla	October 25, 1990	607-229	13.1
Mike is supposed to fire Leona's new assistant who's driving everyone crazy, but when he tries, the assistant meets Richard and the two hit it off. Later, Richard pressures Mike to get the job back, which he does. Then Richard finds out what he is really like.
27	6	"Providence"	Norman Steinberg	David Frankel, Norman Steinberg	November 1, 1990	607-223	12.3
Mike is stuck being on call during the weekend his father is being honored by the Medical Association. When Richard isn't invited, Mike wants to patch things up between them; however, his father is involved in a life-threatening accident.
28	7	"The Last Temptation of Mike"	James Widdoes	David Blum, Terri Minsky	November 8, 1990	607-230	9.2
Richard suggests that Mike start a reading group to keep his "brain alive." When everyone else has left Mike and Leona alone in his apartment, things get strange between them.
29	8	"Ice Follies"	Art Dielhenn	Joe Toplyn	November 15, 1990	607-232	13.5
Grant has an opportunity to do some hand modeling work, but becomes overprotective of his hands. Mike finds himself treading lightly after he apparently injures Abe's son, the star player of a "pee-wee" hockey team, while practicing before the big game.
30	9	"The Young and the Hopeless"	David Frankel	Jonathan Feldman	November 22, 1990	607-231	10.6
Mike decides the new receptionist is not working out when her involvement with Grant interferes with the practice. Or is it their age difference?
31	10	"Good Doc, Bad Doc"	Art Dielhenn	Jim Herzfeld	November 29, 1990	607-233	14.1
Part 1 of 3: Abe finds out the reason he and Gail can't have another child is his low sperm count. The partners are participating in the making of a Japanese documentary on American medicine. Mike prescribes some medication for a woman, not knowing she is taking something that will react with it. Consequently, she winds up in the hospital and he is handed a lawsuit.
32	11	"Malpractice Makes Imperfect"	John Neal	John Herzfeld	December 6, 1990	607-234	11.5
Part 2 of 3: Abe must wait ten days before he gets his sperm count retested. Mike is ambushed on Wake Up Providence by the opposition in his legal trouble. When his patients, friends and his lawyer are abandoning him, Mike is faced with an out-of-court settlement that he reluctantly agrees to.
33	12	"Somewhere in the Berkshires"	Norman Steinberg	Roberto Benabib, Karl Fink	December 13, 1990	607-235	12.8
Part 3 of 3: After quitting the practice, Mike moves to a cabin in the mountains. The partners miss Mike, but Grant feels they need to interview for a replacement. Mike begins to treat the local yokels. The partners go to the mountains to bring him back.
34	13	"When Bad Books Happen to Good People"	Robert Berlinger	David Blum, Terri Minsky	December 20, 1990	607-226	11.3
Excerpts from Mike's new novel don't shed a good light on the other partners, so they try to block it by getting a court order stopping the publication. Mike works on their egos as he tries to get them to remove the injunction.
35	14	"Sleeping Sickness"	James Widdoes	Eugene B. Stein	January 3, 1991	607-221	13.0
Richard gets hooked on sleeping pills, and the partners realize they've all been used to feed his habit. So Mike needs the partners to keep an eye on him until he falls asleep, which puts a damper on their trip to New York.
36	15	"Anatomy of Love"	Peter Bonerz	Joe Toplyn	June 8, 1991	607-237	7.3
Mike tries to rekindle his romance with Jenna, the jet-setting photographer, but her latest exhibition shows him in all his glory. Abe lets Dierdre and Faye in on a winning proposition, but not Grant.
37	16	"Butterfields Are Free"	Robert Berlinger	Neena Beber	June 15, 1991	607-236	6.5
Mike makes the plans for Abe and Gail's wedding anniversary at the dorm room where they first met, but Gail has other ideas. Abe winds up staying at Mike's.
38	17	"Butterfield's Complaint"	Robert Berlinger	Jonathan Feldman	June 22, 1991	607-240	6.6
Mike thinks it's time for Abe to get out again, since it has been three months since Abe and Gail separated, so Mike finds him a blind date.
39	18	"Two Angry Men"	Robert Berlinger	Terri Minsky	July 6, 1991	607-239	5.1
Mike and Richard ask their father for a loan to fix their leaky roof, then they stumble across his dirty laundry and try to figure out if it's for real. Faye dumps her companion of twelve years.
40	19	"Long Day's Journey into Dierdre"	Robert Berlinger	Roberto Benabib, Karl Fink	Unaired	607-238	N/A
Dierdre's patient dies; she is shaken by the event and fearful that she will grow old alone. In his effort to help, Mike offers to marry her.
