= Shining Time Station =

American children's television series

- The Shining Time Station title screen with UP 844
- Created by: Britt Allcroft; Rick Siggelkow
- Directed by: Matthew Diamond; Gregory Lehane; Stan Swan; Wayne Moss; John Ferraro; Steve Wright; Frank Vitale
- Starring: Ringo Starr; Didi Conn; Leonard Jackson; Nicole Leach; Brian O'Connor; Jason Woliner; George Carlin; Erica Luttrell; Ari Magder; Danielle Marcot; Jonathan Freeman
- Theme music composer: Joe Raposo
- Opening theme: "Shining Time Station Theme" sung by Kevin Roth
- Composers: Joe Raposo; Paul Derrick Mason (season 1); Stephen Horelick; Stacey Hersh (seasons 2–3 and specials)
- Countries of origin: United States; Canada (seasons 2–3)
- Original language: English
- No. of seasons: 3
- No. of episodes: 65 + 5 specials

Production
- Executive producers: Donald Johnson (1989); Angus Wright (1989); Britt Allcroft (1991–1995); Rick Siggelkow (1991–1995); Jerry Hamza (1995)
- Producers: Britt Allcroft (1989–1991); Rick Siggelkow (1989–1991); Nancy Chapelle (1991–1995); Jim Corston (1995)
- Running time: 28 minutes 60 minutes (specials)
- Production companies: Quality Family Entertainment; WNET/Thirteen New York; Catalyst Entertainment (seasons 2–3)

Original release
- Network: PBS
- Release: January 29, 1989 – November 20, 1995

Related
- Thomas & Friends; Noddy

Shining Time Station is a children's television series jointly created by British television producer Britt Allcroft and American television producer Rick Siggelkow. The series was produced by Quality Family Entertainment (the American branch of The Britt Allcroft Company), in association with Catalyst Entertainment in seasons 2 and 3, for New York City's PBS station WNET/Thirteen New York, and was originally taped in New York City during its first season and in Toronto during the rest of its run. It incorporated sequences from the British television show Thomas the Tank Engine & Friends, which was in turn based on the books of The Railway Series written by the Reverend Wilbert Awdry.

The series aired on PBS from January 29, 1989, until June 11, 1993, with four hour-long "Family Specials" premiering in primetime throughout 1995. Reruns continued to air on PBS until June 11, 1998. Shining Time Station reruns aired on Fox Family from 1998 to 1999, and on Nick Jr. from June to August 2000 to promote the theatrical release of Thomas and the Magic Railroad. The series also aired on Canadian television networks such as APTN and SCN. Elements from the show were incorporated into the 2000 film Thomas and the Magic Railroad.

The initial 1989 season featured a cast that included Ringo Starr as Mr. Conductor, Didi Conn as Stacy Jones, Brian O'Connor as Horace Schemer, Leonard Jackson as Harry Cupper, Jason Woliner as Matt Jones and Nicole Leach as Tanya Cupper. Following a Christmas special with the original cast, the show was retooled for the second (1991) and third (1993) seasons, with only Conn and O'Connor reprising their prior roles. George Carlin replaced Starr as Mr. Conductor, while Erica Luttrell, Ari Magder, Danielle Marcot, and Tom Jackson joined the primary cast in newly created roles. The series concluded with four "Family Specials", aired in 1995. Providing the musical numbers for the show was The Jukebox Band, a group of puppets.

In 1996, Carlin appeared in a spin-off series called Mr. Conductor's Thomas Tales, which featured only six episodes with five Thomas stories and one music video each. The station interior was kept for the spin-off.

== Background ==
After the success of Thomas the Tank Engine & Friends in the United Kingdom, Britt Allcroft and her production company teamed up with PBS station WNET in New York City to produce and distribute the sitcom-esque Shining Time Station, every episode of which would include a couple of episodes of Thomas the Tank Engine & Friends. The series starred Ringo Starr, George Carlin, Didi Conn, Brian O'Connor, and the Flexitoon Puppets. Ringo Starr, who had already been providing the narration for the British series, agreed to extend the role to include the on-screen character called Mr. Conductor in Shining Time Station. He left the show after its initial season to focus on his musical career and was replaced by George Carlin. Production took place in New York City for the first season and then subsequently in Toronto.

Shining Time Station received critical acclaim. In a review for Entertainment Weekly, Ken Tucker states that, compared to the faster paced Where in the World Is Carmen Sandiego?, "'Shining Time Station' wants to slow things down. It's an old-fashioned show that creates a gentle, lulling atmosphere to convince children that life is fun and that trains are the way to travel." It was a ratings success as well. In its first season, the show averaged a 0.9 Nielsen rating, translating to about 1.2 million viewers on average. At the peak of its popularity, the show brought in up to 7.5 million viewers per week.

== Overview ==
The Shining Time Station is a fictional train station on the Indian Valley Railroad in an unknown part of the United States. It is managed by Stacy Jones. Its workshop is run in the first season by Harry Cupper, and thereafter by Billy Twofeathers. A local named Horace Schemer, simply referred to as Schemer, runs the station's arcade and serves as the series' comic relief. He often comes up with tricks and schemes (hence his surname) to get his ways, although they usually backfire on him as a result of his foolishness. The narrative is driven by regular and incidental visitors to the station.

Mr. Conductor is a tiny man who lives in a signal house inside the station's mural and tells the stories taken from Thomas the Tank Engine & Friends to the kids. He also introduces songs to the kids in the Anything Tunnel. Sometimes, he may present to the kids a magic bubble that has the song inside as a way of introducing it. On occasion, the kids may look through a film viewer to see the song or film.

== Cast ==
=== Main ===
- Didi Conn as Stacy Jones, the kindhearted station master and aunt to Matt and Dan
- Brian O'Connor as Horace Schemer, the proprietor of the station's arcade
- Ringo Starr as Mr. Conductor (season 1, Christmas special), a 20-centimetre tall conductor with a magic whistle that helps him teleport away
- George Carlin as Mr. Conductor (seasons 2–3, family specials), the first Mr. Conductor's cousin
- Leonard Jackson as Henry "Harry" Cupper (season 1, Christmas special, family special 3), an engineer and grandfather of Tanya and Kara
- Nicole Leach as Tanya Cupper (main, season 1, Christmas special; guest, season 2), Harry's granddaughter and Kara's cousin
- Jason Woliner as Matthew "Matt" Jones (main, season 1, Christmas special; guest, season 2), Stacy's nephew who visits the station
- Tom Jackson as Billy Twofeathers (seasons 2–3, Family Specials), the engineer who replaced Harry after he left and Kit's uncle
- Erica Luttrell as Kara Cupper (seasons 2–3, Family Specials), Harry's granddaughter and Tanya's cousin
- Ari Magder as Daniel "Dan" Jones (seasons 2–3, Family Specials), Stacy's nephew and Matt's cousin
- Danielle Marcot – Becky (recurring, season 2; main, season 3, Family Specials), a local girl who is friends with Dan and Kara

=== Recurring ===
- Jerome Dempsey as Osgood Bob Flopdinger, the mayor of the town of Shining Time
- Mart Hulswit as J.B. King, Esq., the superintendent of the Indian Valley Railroad
- Bobo Lewis as Midge Smoot, the town gossip
- Jonathan Shapiro as Schemee (seasons 2–3, Family Specials), Schemer's nephew
- Gerard Parkes as Barton Winslow (seasons 2–3), the proprietor of the town's general store
- Barbara Hamilton as Ginny Johnson (seasons 2–3, Family Specials), a farmer
- Aurelio Padrón as Felix Perez (seasons 2–3, Family Specials), a bus driver
- Bucky Hill as Kit Twofeathers (Family Specials), Billy's nephew

=== Notable guest stars ===
- Ardon Bess as Tucker Cooper, Harry's cousin ("'Tis a Gift")
- Lloyd Bridges as Mr. Nicholas ("'Tis a Gift")
- Rachel Miner as Vickie ("'Tis a Gift")
- Ed Begley Jr. as Ned Kincaid and his great-grandson ("Once Upon a Time")
- Jack Klugman as Max Okowsky ("Second Chances")
- Teri Garr as Sister Conductor ("One of the Family")
- Jeannette Charles as the Queen ("Queen for a Day")

=== The Jukebox Band ===
- Jonathan Freeman as Tito Swing, the pianist
- Olga Marin as Didi, the drummer
- Wayne White (1989) and Alan Semok (1990–95) as Tex, a guitarist
- Craig Marin as Rex, a guitarist
- Peter Baird (1989–95), Alan Semok (1989), and Kenny Miele (1990–95) puppeteering Grace, the bass guitarist
- Emily Bindinger as the singing voice of Didi
- Rory Dodd as the singing voice of Tex and Rex
- Vaneese Thomas as the speaking voice (1989) and singing voice (1989–95) of Grace
- Beverly Glenn-Copeland as the speaking voice (1990–95) of Grace

The instrumentation of the songs was performed and produced by Steve Horelick, who also arranged the vocals. The music was arranged by Larry Wolf.

== Segments ==
The intro to each episode consists of the main theme song of the show, played to footage of the Union Pacific Steam Locomotive 844 and the credits of the series' characters. Only the first verse is sung for the beginning theme. The closing credits contain more shots of the Union Pacific 844, in addition to the full Shining Time Station theme song. For the Christmas special "'Tis A Gift", the footage used for the opening and closing sequences was filmed at the Grand Canyon Railway in Williams, Arizona and features their locomotive #18.

- Flexitoons Puppets & Marionettes – The Jukebox Band – the show's station band that performs a song inside the jukebox. They consist of pianist Tito Swing, drummer Didi, guitarists Tex and Rex (who control the guitar together), and bass guitarist Grace Bass. JJ Silvers is the manager of The Jukebox Band.
- Thomas the Tank Engine & Friends – Storytellers, Ringo Starr and George Carlin.
- The Anything Tunnel – Inside the tunnel on the station's mural is a song with a cartoon, a stop motion clip, or a live action one. Sometimes instead of the Anything Tunnel, Mr. Conductor would show a magic bubble or one of the kids would look through a film viewer.

== Episodes ==
=== Series overview ===
Season	Episodes	Originally released	
Season	Episodes	First released	Last released
1	20	January 29, 1989	June 11, 1989
2	20	November 18, 1991	December 27, 1991
3	25	March 22, 1993	June 11, 1993
Specials	4	February 28, 1995	November 20, 1995
Thomas Tales	6	October 7, 1996	November 11, 1996

=== Season 1 (1989) ===
No. overall	No. in season	Title	Directed by	Written by	Thomas stories	Featured song(s)	Air date
1		"A Place Unlike Any Other"	Matthew Diamond	Brian McConnachie	"Thomas Gets Tricked" "Edward Helps Out"	"I've Been Working on the Railroad" "Start Where You Are"	January 29, 1989
2		"Does It Bite?"	Matthew Diamond	Brian McConnachie	"Come Out, Henry!" "Henry to the Rescue"	"Camptown Races" "Don't Be Afraid"	February 5, 1989
3		"And the Band Played Off"	Matthew Diamond	Brian McConnachie	"A Big Day for Thomas" "Trouble for Thomas"	"She'll Be Coming 'Round the Mountain" "Learn from Your Mistakes"	February 12, 1989
4		"Pitching In and Helping Out"	Matthew Diamond	Ellis Weiner	"Thomas Saves the Day" "James Learns a Lesson"	"Railroad Corral"	February 19, 1989
5		"Show and Yell"	Matthew Diamond	Brian McConnachie	"Foolish Freight Cars" "A Proud Day for James"	"Freight Train" "Bounce Back"	February 26, 1989
6		"Faith, Hope and Anxiety"	Matthew Diamond	Brian McConnachie	"Thomas and the Conductor" "Thomas Goes Fishing"	"Wabash Cannonball" "The Kite Song"	March 5, 1989
7		"Agree to Disagree"	Matthew Diamond	Ellis Weiner	"Terence the Tractor" "Thomas and Bertie's Great Race"	"Abilene" "We Do Things Differently"	March 12, 1989
8		"Whistle While You Work"	Matthew Diamond	Ellis Weiner	"Tenders and Turntables" "Trouble in the Shed"	"Pop Goes the Weasel" "Let's All Work Together"	March 19, 1989
9		"Two Old Hands"	Matthew Diamond	Ellis Weiner	"Percy Runs Away" "Thomas Comes to Breakfast"	"A Railroader for Me" "Baking a Cake"	March 26, 1989
10		"Happy Accidents"	Matthew Diamond	Alan Kingsberg	"Henry's Special Coal" "The Flying Kipper"	"Wreck of the Old 97"	April 2, 1989
11		"Ring in the Old"	Matthew Diamond	Alan Kingsberg	"Toby the Tram Engine" "Thomas Breaks the Rules"	"Train Is a Comin'" "Old But Wise"	April 9, 1989
12		"Impractical Jokes"	Matthew Diamond	Ellis Weiner	"A Cow on the Line" "Old Iron"	"Poor Paddy Works on the Railway"	April 16, 1989
13		"Finders Keepers"	Gregory Lehane	Brian McConnachie	"Double Trouble" "James in a Mess"	"The Desperado" "Tubby the Tuba" (excerpt)	April 23, 1989
14		"Just Wild About Harry's Workshop"	Gregory Lehane	Ellis Weiner	"Duck Takes Charge" "Percy Proves a Point"	"Union Train" "What Goes Around Comes Around"	April 30, 1989
15		"Promises, Promises"	Gregory Lehane	Ellis Weiner	"Better Late Than Never" "Pop Goes the Diesel"	"Oh! Susanna"	May 7, 1989
16		"Word's Out"	Gregory Lehane	Brian McConnachie	"Diesel's Devious Deed" "A Close Shave for Duck"	"Jesse James" "Be Good to Yourself"	May 14, 1989
17		"Too Many Cooks"	Gregory Lehane	Ellis Weiner	"Gordon Takes a Dip" "Down the Mine"	"The Ballad of Casey Jones"	May 21, 1989
18		"Mapping It Out"	Gregory Lehane	Ellis Weiner	"The Runaway" "Percy Takes the Plunge"	"Red River Valley" "Follow Directions"	May 28, 1989
19		"Things That Go Ga-Hooga in the Night"	Gregory Lehane	Brian McConnachie	"Percy's Ghostly Trick" "Woolly Bear"	"Oh My Darling, Clementine"	June 4, 1989
20		"Is This the End?"	Gregory Lehane	Brian McConnachie	"Saved from Scrap" "A New Friend for Thomas"	"Little Black Train"	June 11, 1989
21	Special	"'Tis a Gift"	Gregory Lehane	Brian McConnachie	TV: "Terence the Tractor" "Thomas' Christmas Party" VHS: "Thomas' Christmas Party" "Thomas and the Missing Christmas Tree"	"Over the River and Through the Wood" "Jingle Bells" "It's Christmastime at the Railway Station" "The Hobo Song" "Simple Gifts"	November 25, 1990

=== Season 2 (1991) ===
No. overall	No. in season	Title	Directed by	Written by	Thomas story(s)	Featured song(s)	Air date
22	1	"Scare Dares"	Stan Swan	Ellis Weiner	"Percy's Ghostly Trick" "Thomas, Percy and the Dragon"	"Midnight Special" "What Am I Afraid Of?"	November 18, 1991
23	2	"Oh, What a Tangled Web"	Stan Swan	Sean Kelly	"Diesel's Devious Deed" "No Joke for James"	"Mama Don't Allow"	November 19, 1991
24	3	"The Magic is Believing"	Stan Swan	Brian McConnachie	"Old Iron" "Edward's Exploit"	"Nine Hundred Miles"	November 20, 1991
25	4	"Win, Lose or Draw"	Stan Swan	Jill Golick	"Double Trouble" "Gordon and the Famous Visitor"	"Arkansas Traveler"	November 21, 1991
26	5	"Sweet and Sour"	Gregory Lehane	Wilson Coneybeare	"Donald and Douglas" "The Deputation"	"Erie Canal"	November 22, 1991
27	6	"Achoo"	Stan Swan	Brian McConnachie	"Trust Thomas" "Whistles and Sneezes"	"Cosher Bailey's Engine" "Caring"	November 25, 1991
28	7	"A Dog's Life"	Gregory Lehane	Wilson Coneybeare	"James in a Mess" "The Trouble with Mud"	"Home on the Range"	November 26, 1991
29	8	"Field Day"	Gregory Lehane	Sean Kelly	"Percy Proves a Point" "Thomas and Bertie's Great Race"	"Take Me Out to the Ball Game" "Everyone's a Winner"	November 27, 1991
30	9	"Wrong Track"	Gregory Lehane	Wilson Coneybeare	"Thomas Saves the Day" "Down the Mine"	"Sweet Betsy from Pike"	November 28, 1991
31	10	"Washout"	Gregory Lehane	Jill Golick	"Bertie's Chase" "Percy's Promise"	"Cumberland Gap"	November 29, 1991
32	11	"Crackpot"	Stan Swan	Jill Golick	"Woolly Bear" "Henry's Forest"	"John Henry"	December 16, 1991
33	12	"Yabba, Yabba, Yabba"	Stan Swan	Ellis Weiner	"Pop Goes the Diesel" "Diesel Does It Again"	"Old Dan Tucker"	December 17, 1991
34	13	"Nickel in a Pickle"	Gregory Lehane	Wilson Coneybeare	"Thomas Comes to Breakfast" "Thomas Gets Bumped"	"My Bonnie Lies over the Ocean"	December 18, 1991
35	14	"Stop the Press"	Stan Swan	Sean Kelly	"Percy and the Signal" "A Big Day for Thomas"	"Tennessee Central (Number 9)"	December 19, 1991
36	15	"He Loves Me, He Loves Me Not"	Gregory Lehane	Sean Kelly	"Thomas, Percy and the Mail Train"	"I Dream of Jeanie" "Would He Ever"	December 20, 1991
37	16	"Double Trouble"	Gregory Lehane	Don Arioli	"The Diseasel" "Donald's Duck"	"This Train"	December 23, 1991
38	17	"Is Anybody There?"	Gregory Lehane	Peter Wildman	"Thomas Goes Fishing" "A Scarf for Percy"	"Chattanooga Choo Choo"	December 24, 1991
39	18	"Do I Hear?"	Gregory Lehane	Wilson Coneybeare	"Mavis" "Toby's Tightrope"	"The Riddle Song" "Better When He Grows Up"	December 25, 1991
40	19	"Jingle, Jingle, Jingle"	Stan Swan	Brian McConnachie	"Time for Trouble" "Trouble for Thomas"	"City of New Orleans"	December 26, 1991
41	20	"All's Fair"	Stan Swan	Ellis Weiner	"Edward, Trevor and the Really Useful Party"	"The Railroad Cars Are Coming" "Home"	December 27, 1991

=== Season 3 (1993) ===
No. overall	No. in season	Title	Directed by	Written by	Thomas story(s)	Featured song(s)	Air date
42	1	"Becky Makes a Wish"	Wayne Moss	Sean Kelly	"All at Sea"	"Cielito Lindo" "Help Your Wish Along"	March 22, 1993
43	2	"Schemer's Alone"	John Ferraro	Wilson Coneybeare	"Percy, James and the Fruitful Day"	"Polly Wolly Doodle" "I Can Do It"	March 23, 1993
44	3	"Bully for Mr. Conductor"	Wayne Moss	Brian McConnachie	"Bulgy"	"Jamaica Farewell" "Bad Guy"	March 24, 1993
45	4	"Stacy Cleans Up"	Wayne Moss	Brian McConnachie	"James Goes Buzz Buzz"	"Five Hundred Miles" "If Everyone Did a Little"	March 25, 1993
46	5	"Schemer's Robot"	John Ferraro	Wilson Coneybeare	"Tenders and Turntables" "Trouble in the Shed"	"Strolling in the Park One Day"	April 19, 1993
47	6	"Billy Saves the Day"	Wayne Moss	Jill Golick	"A New Friend for Thomas"	"Get On Board, Little Children"	April 20, 1993
48	7	"Billy's Party"	Wayne Moss	Brian McConnachie	"Thomas and Percy's Mountain Adventure"	"We Gather Together" (Note: Includes an interlude of "Come, Ye Thankful People, Come".) "Thanksgiving"	April 21, 1993
49	8	"Fortune Teller Schemer"	Wayne Moss	Ellis Weiner	"Thomas and the Conductor" "A Cow on the Line"	"Turkey in the Straw"	April 22, 1993
50	9	"Billy's Runaway Train"	John Ferraro	Sean Kelly	"A Close Shave for Duck"	"Freight Train Blues"	May 3, 1993
51	10	"Schemer Goes Camping"	John Ferraro	Wilson Coneybeare	"Percy Takes the Plunge"	"Crawdad" "Team"	May 4, 1993
52	11	"Mr. Conductor's Evil Twin"	John Ferraro	Don Arioli	"Heroes"	"Danny Boy"	May 5, 1993
53	12	"Bad Luck Day at Shining Time Station"	John Ferraro	Wilson Coneybeare	"Gordon Takes a Dip"	"Engine 143"	May 6, 1993
54	13	"Mr. Conductor's Fourth of July"	John Ferraro	Sean Kelly	"Escape"	"New River Train" "Patriotic Medley" (Note: Consists of "Yankee Doodle", "Dixie", "The Yankee Doodle Boy", and "America the Beautiful".)	May 17, 1993
55	14	"Stacy Forgets Her Name"	Wayne Moss	Sean Kelly	"Thomas Gets Tricked"	"Lullaby Medley" (Note: Consists of "All Through the Night", "All the Pretty Little Horses", and "Golden Slumbers".)	May 18, 1993
56	15	"Schemer's Special Club"	Wayne Moss	Ellis Weiner	"Oliver Owns Up"	"Old Joe Clark"	May 19, 1993
57	16	"Mr. Conductor's Movie"	Wayne Moss	Marie Therese Squerciati	"Tender Engines"	"There's No Business Like Show Business"	May 20, 1993
58	17	"The Joke's on Schemer"	Wayne Moss	Ellis Weiner	"Wrong Road"	"This Old Man" "Laugh and a Half"	May 31, 1993
59	18	"Dance Crazy"	John Ferraro	Jill Golick	"Percy Runs Away"	"Orange Blossom Special" "Dancin' Maître D'"	June 1, 1993
60	19	"Mysterious Stranger"	Wayne Moss	Marie Therese Squerciati	"Come Out, Henry!" "Henry to the Rescue"	"Waltzing Matilda" "Everyone's Afraid of Something"	June 2, 1993
61	20	"Dan's Big Race"	John Ferraro	Wilson Coneybeare	"Henry's Special Coal" "The Flying Kipper"	"Michael, Row the Boat Ashore" (Note: Includes an interlude of "Row, Row, Row Your Boat".) "Start All Over Again"	June 3, 1993
62	21	"Mr. Conductor Gets Left Out"	Wayne Moss	Brian McConnachie	"One Good Turn"	"New River Train"	June 7, 1993
63	22	"Mr. Conductor's Big Sleepwalk"	John Ferraro	Don Arioli	"Better Late Than Never"	"Beautiful Dreamer" "Dreamland"	June 8, 1993
64	23	"The Mayor Runs for Re-Election"	Wayne Moss	Ellis Weiner	"James Learns a Lesson" "Foolish Freight Cars"	"Hurray for the Railway"	June 9, 1993
65	24	"Stacy Says No"	John Ferraro	Jill Golick	"Duck Takes Charge"	"Cannonball Blues"	June 10, 1993
66	25	"How the Station Got Its Name"	John Ferraro	Jill Golick	"Toby the Tram Engine" "Thomas Breaks the Rules"	"Cowboy Medley" (Note: Consists of "Roll On, Little Dogies" and "My Home's in Montana".)	June 11, 1993

=== Specials (1995) ===
No. overall	No. in season	Title	Directed by	Written by	Thomas story(s)	Featured song(s)	Air date
67	1	"Once Upon a Time"	Wayne Moss; Frank Vitale (Note: Vitale directed outdoor scenes.)	Sean Kelly	"Rusty to the Rescue" "Thomas and Stepney"	"Lone Star Trail" "Buffalo Gals Medley" (Note: Includes "I Love the Mountains".) "What's New Pussycat?"	February 28, 1995
68	2	"Second Chances"	Wayne Moss; Frank Vitale	Brian McConnachie	"Granpuff" "Sleeping Beauty"	"Down in the Valley" "Skip to My Lou Medley" (Note: Includes "Freight Train" and "Pick a Bale of Cotton".) "Take Me Out to the Ball Game"	September 25, 1995
69	3	"One of the Family"	Wayne Moss; Frank Vitale	Brian McConnachie	"Toad Stands By" "Thomas and the Special Letter"	"If My Friends Could See Me Now" "Long, Long Ago" "This Land Is My Land"	October 23, 1995
70	4	"Queen for a Day"	Wayne Moss; Frank Vitale	Sean Kelly	"Thomas Meets the Queen" "Special Attraction"	"The Lovely Ohio" "Greensleeves" / "Scarborough Fair" "Mrs. Murphy's Chowder"	November 20, 1995

=== Mr. Conductor's Thomas Tales (1996) ===
All episodes directed by Steve Wright and written by Sean Kelly.

No.	Title	Stories	Song	Air date
1	"Missing Whistles"	"Bulls Eyes"; "Train Stops Play"; "Percy's Ghostly Trick"; "Thomas, Percy and the Dragon"; "Special Funnel"	"Really Useful Engine"	October 7, 1996
2	"Wild Life"	"Four Little Engines"; "Trouble for Thomas"; "Toad Stands By"; "Thomas Saves the Day"; "Rusty Helps Peter Sam"	"Toby"	October 14, 1996
3	"Wish You Were Here"	"Thomas, Percy and the Mail Train"; "Mind That Bike"; "Rock 'n' Roll"; "Home at Last"; "Thomas and the Special Letter"	"Island Song"	October 21, 1996
4	"For the Birds"	"A Bad Day for Sir Handel"; "Steam Roller"; "Old Iron"; "Double Trouble"; "Bowled Out"	"Don't Judge a Book by Its Cover"	October 28, 1996
5	"Splish, Splash, Splosh"	"Passengers and Polish"; "Gallant Old Engine"; "Bertie's Chase"; "Peter Sam and the Refreshment Lady"; "You Can't Win"	"Gone Fishing"	November 4, 1996
6	"Paint the Town Red"	"Come Out, Henry!"; "Fish"; "Whistles and Sneezes"; "Henry and the Elephant"; "Bulldog"	"Let's Have a Race"	November 11, 1996

== Merchandise and home media ==
=== VHS ===
Most VHS releases (the exceptions being "'Tis a Gift", "Shining Time Station Singsongs", "Schemer Presents: The World According to Me", and the two Jukebox Band videos) featured new wraparounds, presenting the episode as the main feature at the "Shining Time Drive-In Movie Theater", complete with in-universe commercials. These videos also featured "Schemer Presents!", bonus educational sketches starring Schemer, following the episode. The model drive-in scenes are sampled from the art film Easy Living by Chip Lord and Mickey McGowan.

- "'Tis a Gift"
- "Sweet and Sour"
- "Stacy Cleans Up"
- "Schemer Alone"
- "Bully for Mr. Conductor"
- "Becky Makes a Wish"
- "Billy's Party"
- "Schemer's Special Club"
- "Mr. Conductor's Evil Twin"
- "Shining Time Station Singsongs"
- "Schemer Presents: The World According to Me"
- "The Jukebox Band: A Day in the Life"
- "The Jukebox Band: Lullaby"

=== Book ===
- A book, titled This Old Band, was written by Britt Allcroft and Rick Siggelkow. It featured the Jukebox Band and was published by Quality Family Entertainment in 1994.

=== Music ===
Four cassettes were released featuring music from the series performed by the Jukebox Band:

- Sleepytime Singsongs (1993)
- Rainy Day Singsongs (1993)
- Rise and Shine Singsongs (1994)
- Birthday Party Singsongs (1994)

All four featured dialogue linking the songs, including in-universe ads.

Australian label Silbert Records released four soundtracks to the series, compiling all of the songs, between May 2023 and February 2024.

== See also ==
- Thomas & Friends
- Noddy, a similar series also created by Rick Siggelkow.
