= Center for Infectious Disease Research and Policy =

- Abbreviation: CIDRAP
- Formation: 2001
- Purpose: "to prevent illness and death from infectious diseases through epidemiologic research and the rapid translation of scientific information into real-world practical applications and solutions"
- Location: Minneapolis, Minnesota, U.S.
- Coordinates: 44.971979°N 93.232962°W
- Director: Michael T. Osterholm
- Parent organization: Research Innovation Office (RIO)
- Affiliations: University of Minnesota
- Website: www.cidrap.umn.edu

The Center for Infectious Disease Research and Policy (CIDRAP) is a center within the University of Minnesota that focuses on addressing public health preparedness and emerging infectious disease response. It was founded in 2001 by Michael Osterholm, to "prevent illness and death from infectious diseases through epidemiological research and rapid translation of scientific information into real-world practical applications and solutions". It is not part of the Center for Disease Control or National Institute of Health.

== History ==
Michael Osterholm founded Center for Infectious Disease Research and Policy (CIDRAP) in 2001.

== Primary activities ==
=== News publishing ===
The CIDRAP news team, through the CIDRAP web site, provides daily news updates on emerging infectious diseases, such as pandemic influenza, bioterrorism, food safety, avian influenza, and emerging topics. Along with news articles, the site provides overviews on various infectious disease topics, as well as lists of recent selected literature for each topic. CIDRAP's daily news service has 20,000 current newsletter subscribers and over 36,000 Twitter followers.

=== Influenza Vaccines R&D Roadmap ===
CIDRAP, with support from the Wellcome Trust and the involvement of international experts, developed and launched the influenza vaccines research and development (R&D) roadmap (IVR) 2021. The roadmap serves as a strategic planning tool to facilitate R&D, coordinate funding, and promote stakeholder engagement in R&D for improving seasonal influenza vaccines and new universal or broadly protective influenza vaccines. The IVR focuses on six key topic areas: virology, immunology, vaccinology for seasonal influenza vaccines, vaccinology for broadly protective or universal influenza vaccines, animal models and the controlled human influenza virus infection model (CHIVIM), and policy, financing, and regulation. Following the IVR launch, CIDRAP, with support from Wellcome Trust, began the next phase of the IVR Initiative: monitoring, evaluation, and adjustment (ME&A). ME&A involves tracking progress towards and funding for IVR goals and milestones, the Universal Influenza Vaccine Technology Landscape (a database tracking universal, broadly protective, and next-generation influenza vaccine candidates), and various communication activities (e.g., IVR newsletter, conference presentations).

=== Coronavirus Vaccines R&D Roadmap (CVR) ===
The coronavirus vaccines R&D roadmap (CVR) was developed by CIDRAP and an international group of experts with funding from the Gates Foundation and The Rockefeller Foundation; the CVR was launched in February 2023. The roadmap vision is “to accelerate the development of durable, broadly protective coronavirus vaccines that: (1) are suitable for use in all regions of the globe, including remote areas and low- and middle-income countries (LMICs), (2) can reduce severe illness and death (and potentially prevent infection), and (3) will mitigate the impact of future coronavirus epidemics or pandemics worldwide.” Similar to the IVR, the CVR identifies strategic goals and aligned milestones for each of its key topic areas: virology, immunology, vaccinology, animal models and the CHIVIM, and policy and financing. Beginning in 2024, with support from the Coalition for Epidemic Preparedness Innovations (CEPI), CIDRAP began a CVR ME&A program, which involves tracking progress towards roadmap goals and milestones and publishing a landscape of broadly protective coronavirus vaccine candidates.

=== Antimicrobial Stewardship Program ===
Antimicrobial resistance is a critical global public health issue, and antimicrobial stewardship strategies are key to curtailing the problem. CIDRAP's Antimicrobial Stewardship Project provides current, accurate, and comprehensive information on the topic and works to build an online community to address leading issues.

=== Novel Coronavirus (COVID-19) Resource Center ===
CIDRAP is tracking and analyzing the rapidly evolving novel coronavirus (COVID-19) pandemic. The CIDRAP COVID-19 Resource Center provides a deep well of information for public health experts, business preparedness leaders, government officials, and the public.

=== Resilient Drug Supply Project ===
The Resilient Drug Supply Project focuses on the supply chains and global disruptions for the most critical drugs for life-saving and life-sustaining treatment. Outcomes of this research will improve the healthcare supply system's ability to maintain a steady and adequate supply of critical medicines and supplies worldwide.

=== Public health alerts ===
In October 2025, CIDRAP and the New England Journal of Medicine announced they would be partnering to publish freely available public health alerts. These alerts are intended to provide timely public health data and outbreak information, filling gaps in publications from the CDC's Morbidity and Mortality Weekly Report since the beginning of the second Trump administration.

== Past Initiatives ==
=== Ebola Vaccine Team B ===
Wellcome Trust and CIDRAP launched the Ebola vaccine Team B initiative in November 2014 to assist international efforts to develop in record time safe and effective vaccines against Ebola virus disease. The project includes 25 leaders in public health, medicine, bioethics, pharmaceutical manufacturing, and humanitarian relief. The experts provide a fresh perspective (a Team B analysis) of issues being addressed by international collaborators in the areas of funding, research, development, vaccine efficacy and effectiveness determination, licensure, manufacturing, and vaccination strategy (distribution and administration). To date, Team B has published its findings in the following reports:

- "Completing the Development of Ebola Vaccines: Current Status, Remaining Challenges, and Recommendations"
- "Plotting the Course of Ebola Vaccines: Challenges and Unanswered Questions"
- "Recommendations for Accelerating Development of Ebola Vaccines: Report and Analysis"
- "Fast-Track Development of Ebola Vaccines: Principles and Target Product Criteria"

=== BioWatch ===
CIDRAP has served as a partner in the federal BioWatch air-monitoring program. This program is responsible for monitoring for potential bioterrorism-related agents in cities throughout the United States. Through its contract with the Department of Homeland Security, CIDRAP provides support for the development of national outdoor and indoor guidance documents, a national epidemiology communications network, and a suite of related program and reference documents.

=== Minnesota Center of Excellence for Influenza Research and Surveillance (MCEIRS) ===
The Minnesota Center of Excellence for Influenza Research and Surveillance (MCEIRS), established by the National Institutes of Health (NIH) and CIDRAP in April 2007, was one of six NIH-supported centers in the United States. The activities of the center, including research and surveillance both domestically and abroad, were focused on the detection, epidemiology, and transmission of avian influenza (AI) viruses with pandemic potential. The primary goal of MCEIRS was to enhance the understanding of how AI viruses evolve, adapt, and spread among animal and human populations. the center closed in April 2014.

=== Public Health Practices (PHP) ===
Public Health Practices (PHP) was a compendium of tools, strategies, and downloadables created by US health agencies and partners to prepare for and respond to the health consequences of disasters and emergencies. The project ended in December 2014.

Practitioners can still search the resources by hazard, strategy, partners, geography, groups being served, agency, tool, language, and key word. PHP encourages peer-to-peer exchange of practices by accepting submissions to the site, showcasing examples in theme-based email newsletters, and hosting social media channels for practitioners.

Public Health Practices features:

- More than 400 practices addressing a wide range of hazards
- Successful coalitions and details about what made them possible
- Stories on how projects were created
- Communication materials in 40 languages to download or adapt
- A search tool that allows users to apply filters to narrow results as needed
- A simple submissions process to encourage practitioners to share their work
- Peer-to-peer information exchange via social media
