= Woman on the Run: The Lawrencia Bembenek Story =

- Based on: Woman on Trial by Lawrencia Bembenek
- Screenplay by: Sandor Stern
- Directed by: Sandor Stern
- Starring: Tatum O'Neal; Bruce Greenwood; Peggy McCay; Colin Fox; Kenneth Welsh; Catherine Disher
- Composer: Peter Manning Robinson
- Countries of origin: United States; Canada
- Original language: English

Production
- Producer: Ian McDougall
- Cinematography: Robert C. New
- Editor: Allan Lee
- Running time: 200 minutes
- Production company: Atlantis Films

Original release
- Network: NBC
- Release: May 16 – May 17, 1993

Woman on the Run: The Lawrencia Bembenek Story is a 1993 American drama film written and directed by Sandor Stern. It is based on the 1992 book Woman on Trial by Lawrencia Bembenek. The film stars Tatum O'Neal, Bruce Greenwood, Peggy McCay, Colin Fox, Kenneth Welsh and Catherine Disher. The film aired on NBC in two parts on May 16, 1993, and on May 17, 1993.

== Cast ==
- Tatum O'Neal as Lawrencia Bembenek
- Bruce Greenwood as her husband Fred Schultz
- Peggy McCay as Virginia Bembenek
- Colin Fox as Joe Bembenek
- Kenneth Welsh as Don Eisenberg
- Catherine Disher as Judy Zess
- Richard Hughes as Russ
- Alan Jordan as Prosecuting Attorney
- Ron White as Det. Rogers
- Saul Rubinek as Bill Bryson
- Alex McArthur as Nick Gugliatto
- Barbara Eve Harris as Zena Jackson
- Ari Magder as Sean Schultz
- Graham Losee as Shannon Schultz
- Gail Webster as Christine Schultz
- David Ferry as Detective Fell
- Ted Simonett as Judge Skwieraski
- Nancy Anne Sakovich as Kim
- Dan Redican as Marty Blaine
- Chantal Craig as Sherry Wonaker
- Brenda Bazinet as Amy Bryson
- Trudy Desmond as Playboy Club Singer
- Doug Samuels as Eddie
- Emmanuel Mark as Jack
- Angelo Pedari as Tony
- Paul Haddad as Corey Fenton
- Graham McPherson as Sergeant McFee
- Thomas Rickert as Bill
- Marv Allemang as Ted Boxner
- Pixie Bigelow as Mrs. Zess
- Matt Cooke as Lieutenant
- Carlton Watson as Neelan
- Jane Moffat as Carla Dishman
- Garfield Andrews as Matt Krone
- Victor Garber as Frank Marrocco
- Robert Joy as Sheldon Zenner
- Linda Griffiths as Maggie Friel
- Patrick Galligan as John Callaghan
- Helene Clarkson as Marybeth
- Norwich Duff as John McClinton
- A. Frank Ruffo as Louie Rebezes
- David Eisner as Ron Lester
- Kathy Greenwood as Sylvia Bonner
- Linda Goranson as Connie Bell
- Elizabeth Hanna as Diane Hanson
- Carolyn Scott as Florek
- Tamar Lee as Dominque
- Roger Dunn as Detective Logan
- Janine Manatis as Dr. Swales
- Elizabeth Lennie as Mary Selby
- Sharon Dyer as Anne
- Mary Lu Zahalan as Maureen Lacy
- Philip Williams as Jake Lipner
- Janet Burke as Debbie
