= Rumor Has It (game show) =

- Presented by: Brian O'Connor
- Narrated by: John Ten Eyck
- Country of origin: United States

Production
- Running time: 30 minutes

Original release
- Network: VH1
- Release: June 7 – October 28, 1993

Rumor Has It is an American daily game show that aired on the cable channel VH1 from June 7 to October 28, 1993. Brian O'Connor was the host and John Ten Eyck announced.

The series was the first game show be broadcast on VH1.

== Main game ==
=== First round ===
Three contestants competed every day, testing their knowledge of celebrity hearsay, fact, and innuendo. Each player began the game with 100 points.

Round one was called "Scandalation", where all questions were multiple choice and concerned celebrity scandal. Correct answers added 10 points to a player's score, while 10 points were deducted for an incorrect answer. Most questions had three multiple choice options, however, there was usually at least one question in which the contestants must identify whether a statement about a celebrity was "truth or just rumor."

When a bell sounded to end the round, the players took part in a "Scandalation Instant Reflex" round. The "Instant Reflex" segment consisted of 10 dual-choice questions on the buzzers worth ±20 points, generally true-or-false in nature, with responses appropriate to the theme of the category. For instance, if the category were famous people who checked into the Betty Ford Clinic, the contestants would have to respond "Yes Betty" to the name of someone who had checked in, or "No Betty" to one who had not. At the end of the round, whoever was in the lead won a prize and the lowest scoring player was eliminated.

In case of a tie for the lowest score, host O'Connor would read a question with a quantifiable answer (for instance, how long a celebrity couple had been married). The first contestant to buzz in would offer an answer; if it was not exactly correct, the other contestant would also offer an answer; whoever was closer to the correct answer won the tiebreaker and advanced.

=== Second round ===
The two remaining players participated in the "Video Tap Round". They were shown a clip from a music video and then tried to identify the artist. A later variation, called "Music Tap," had host O'Connor reading two clues to the identity of an artist. In either case, a "Yahoo!" sound effect would play to indicate that the contestants were allowed to buzz in. After this initial toss-up, two questions about the celebrity were asked; the contestant who identified the artist automatically had first opportunity to answer the first question; the second question was open to both players. All questions were played for 20 points up or down.

The round concluded with another "Instant Reflex" speed round, which was played for ±40 points per question. The player with the highest score at the end of this round won the game and a prize.

== Bonus round ==
The day's winner played the "Rumor Mix and Match" bonus round. Host O'Connor gave a subject, and then showed the contestant a board of eight celebrities (or, occasionally, one celebrity and eight clues relating to that celebrity). The contestant then had 30 seconds to match eight facts to the celebrities or clues based on the subject given. The contestant was given cards with the facts one at a time, and had to place that card before returning for the next one. The contestant could change their answers as much as they liked until time expired.

At the end of the round, the contestant's answers were checked. For each correct answer, the player was credited with an additional 50 points. If all eight statements matched the correct celebrities, the player also won a grand prize.

There were no returning champions, but the nine highest-scoring players returned at the end of the season for the "Total Trash Tournament".
