= Mark Olshaker =

American author (born 1951)

- Born: February 28, 1951 (age 75); Washington, D.C. U.S.
- Education: George Washington University
- Occupation: Author

Mark Olshaker (born February 28, 1951) is an American author from Washington, D.C. who frequently collaborates with FBI agent John E. Douglas in writing books about criminal and investigative psychology. In 1995, they formed Mindhunters, Inc. and later released Mindhunter: Inside the FBI's Elite Serial Crime Unit, which was made into a Netflix series Mindhunter in 2017.

Olshaker worked with public health scientist, Michael Osterholm, detailing the medical system's lack of preparation for another pandemic in their book Deadliest Enemy: Our War Against Killer Germs. In his New York Times article "We’re Not Ready for a Flu Pandemic", Olshaker criticized the lack of funding the government invested in developing a flu vaccine, citing the National Institutes of Health only received $32 million and Biomedical Advanced Research received $43 million for such research in 2017.

Olshaker is a supporter of victims' rights.

== Publications ==
- Douglas, John E., Mark Olshaker. Mindhunter: Inside the FBI's Elite Serial Crime Unit. New York: Scribner. 1995. ISBN 978-0-671-01375-2
- Douglas, John E., Mark Olshaker. Journey into Darkness. New York: Scribner. 1997. ISBN 978-0-684-83304-0
- Douglas, John E., Mark Olshaker. Obsession: The FBI's Legendary Profiler Probes the Psyches of Killers, Rapists and Stalkers and Their Victims and Tells How to Fight Back. New York: Scribner. 1998. ISBN 978-0-684-84560-9
- Douglas, John E., Mark Olshaker. The Anatomy of Motive: The FBI's Legendary Mindhunter Explores the Key to Understanding and Catching Violent Criminals. New York: Scribner. 1999. ISBN 978-0-684-84598-2
- Douglas, John E., Mark Olshaker. The Cases That Haunt Us. New York: Scribner. 2000. ISBN 978-0-684-84600-2
- Douglas, John E., Mark Olshaker. Law & Disorder. New York: Kensington 2013. ISBN 978-0-7582-7312-3
- Douglas, John E., Mark Olshaker. The Killer Across the Table: Unlocking the Secrets of Serial Killers and Predators with the FBI's Original Mindhunter. New York: HarperCollins. 2020. ISBN 978-0-0629-1064-6
- Douglas, John E., Mark Olshaker. The Killer's Shadow: The FBI's Hunt for a White Supremacist Serial Killer. Dey Street Books. 2020
- Douglas, John E., Mark Olshaker. When a Killer Calls: A Haunting Story of Murder, Criminal Profiling, and Justice in a Small Town. Dey Street Books. 2022

=== Fiction ===
- Olshaker, Mark. Einstein’s Brain. M. Evans and Company. 1981. ISBN 978-0-87131-342-3
- Douglas, John E., Mark Olshaker. Broken Wings (Mindhunters). Atria. 1999. ISBN 978-0-671-02391-1

== See also ==
- Crime Classification Manual
- FBI Method of Profiling
- Forensic psychology
- Investigative psychology
- Offender profiling
- John E. Douglas
