= The Cases That Haunt Us =

Non-fiction book by John E. Douglas

- First edition cover design
- Author: John E. Douglas; Mark Olshaker
- Language: English
- Subject: Murder
- Genre: Nonfiction
- Publisher: Scribner
- Publication date: 2000
- Media type: Hardcover
- Pages: 352
- ISBN: 978-0-684-84600-2
- LC Class: 00063524

The Cases That Haunt Us is a 2000 non-fiction book written by John E. Douglas, a former Federal Bureau of Investigation profiler and investigative chief, and Mark Olshaker. Profiling is described by Rodger Lyle Brown, author of the book review, as "the art and science of looking at the specifics of a crime -- the scene, the facts about the victim, the evidence and the act itself -- and extrapolating a portrait of the culprit's psyche and personal habits."

In this book, Douglas explores legendary cases including Lizzie Borden, Jack the Ripper, Black Dahlia, Laurie Bembenek, the Charles Lindbergh Jr. kidnapping, the Zodiac Killer, the Boston Strangler, and the killing of JonBenét Ramsey. Douglas and Olshaker explore the cases and how modern techniques that Douglas pioneered might be used to resolve the cases, such as determining motivation for specific acts.

Of Jack the Ripper suspects, Douglas states that a paranoid individual such as Aaron Kosminski would likely have openly boasted of the murders while incarcerated had he been the killer, but there is no record that he ever did so. Douglas has asserted that behavioural clues gathered from the murders all point to a person "known to the police as David Cohen ... or someone very much like him". Nigel Cawthorne, on the other hand, dismissed Cohen as a likely suspect because in the asylum his assaults were undirected, and his behaviour was wild and uncontrolled, whereas the Ripper seemed to attack specifically and quietly.

Regarding the case of JonBenét, Douglas contends that John and Patsy Ramsey did not kill their daughter. Of the case, he said: "Many crimes are tried in the court of public opinion long before they reach a court of law. But I know of no other case in which the majority of people have decided the solution based on statistics. I know of no other case in which the public substantially believes what has been reported in the tabloids. I know of no other case in which the mainline media have let the tabloids take the lead and then reported on their reporting. And I know of no other case in which largely respectable television programs have so tried to outdo each other in sensationalism."

== See also ==
- Getting Away with Murder: The JonBenet Ramsey Story
- From Hell letter
- Goulston Street graffito
- Perfect Murder, Perfect Town
