= Doctor Doctor (American TV series) =

CBS sitcom

- Genre: Sitcom
- Created by: Norman Steinberg
- Starring: Matt Frewer; Julius Carry; Beau Gravitte; Maureen Mueller; Tony Carreiro; Audrie J. Neenan; Anne Ramsay; Sarah Abrell; Jane Brucker; Dakin Matthews; Inga Swenson
- Theme music composer: Ahmet Ertegün; Leroy Kirkland; Jesse Stone; Danny Taylor
- Opening theme: "Good Lovin'"
- Composer: Artie Butler
- Country of origin: United States
- Original language: English
- No. of seasons: 3
- No. of episodes: 40 (1 unaired) (list of episodes)

Production
- Executive producer: Norman Steinberg
- Producers: David Frankel; Bruce Chevillat; George E. Crosby; Martin Rips; Joseph Staretski
- Running time: 22–24 minutes
- Production companies: Nikndaph Productions; Reeves Entertainment Group

Original release
- Network: CBS
- Release: June 12, 1989 – July 6, 1991

Doctor Doctor is an American television sitcom that aired on CBS. It began a short run in June 1989, and was picked up for a full season the following fall. A second season followed in 1989–1990, but the show was cancelled at the end of the 1990–1991 television season, due to low ratings. One episode, "Long Day's Journey Into Deirdre", remains unaired in the United States (although it was aired as part of series runs in Australia and Great Britain). The series was noted for its edgy humor and star Matt Frewer's use of improvisation.

== Synopsis ==
The show features Matt Frewer as Dr. Mike Stratford, a partner in the medical practice Northeast Medical Partners in Providence, Rhode Island. Most of the comedy surrounds Dr. Stratford's zany antics, tempered by his commitment to his profession and his patients. Though at first serving as "straight men" for Frewer's manic style of comic acting, the other characters gained more depth as the series progressed, and the plots sometimes focused on issues such as AIDS, breast cancer, and homophobia.

== Characters ==
=== Main ===
- Matt Frewer as Mike Stratford, General practitioner, novelist, and TV medical expert. Mike is devoted to his patients, sometimes offering his services for free, much to the consternation of his partners in the practice. His many responsibilities sometimes plays havoc with his love life, as is exemplified in the pilot episode where his unhappy girlfriend has to resort to making a doctor's appointment to see him. The least willing to "maximize the practice," as Grant once suggested, Mike's greatest ambition is to be like Marcus Welby, M.D.
- Julius J. Carry III as Abraham "Abe" Butterfield, Mike's best friend and medical partner, an uptight, ambitious African-American who is anxious to have the “perfect life,” leading him to become at times overly controlling with his wife and son. Though at times exasperated by Mike's endless pranks and off-the-wall comments, Abe is usually the first to go out on a limb for his friend.
- Beau Gravitte as Grant Linowitz, an accomplished, ambitious heart surgeon and the medical partner with whom Mike initially disagrees with the most, Grant is at times egocentric, vain and shallow with a taste for the finer things in life, though these qualities are later downplayed somewhat as the series progressed. He becomes a good friend of Mike's brother Richard.
- Maureen Mueller as Deirdre Bennett, the medical partner who comes off as aloof, or as she puts it, "a complete bitch", and is not above exploiting a situation for her own benefit. However, she is very protective of her patients and her partners, especially Mike. Deirdre also has a weakness for the wrong men, like her married lover Steve. At one point, prior to current events in the show, she had one tryst with Mike.
- Tony Carreiro as Richard Stratford, Mike's brother, and an English professor ("I'm an Associate Professor at a liberal arts college - they pay me in brie"), he shares a house with Mike. Having come out as gay, Richard maintains a close relationship with his brother, though Mike can't resist a good-natured jibe or two at his brother's expense.
- Anne Ramsay as Leona Linowitz, a psychiatrist and Grant's sister, Leona appears in the final season when she moves to Rhode Island with her daughter after her ex-husband writes a hit play which features a character based on her known only as "The Domineering Bitch".
- Jane Brucker as Elizabeth McQueen, Mike's sometime girlfriend, and television producer of Wake Up Providence, Elizabeth tries to keep the show together as Mike presents one wacky medical segment after another. She leaves for New York after the episode, "Bachelor Doctor".
- Audrie J. Neenan as Nurse Faye Barylski, the oversexed head nurse at the practice. Faye is nonplussed by Mike's jokes and strange antics, and has a fondness for The Grateful Dead and bikers like her boyfriend Dana.

=== Recurring ===
- Brian George as Hugh Persons, the host of Wake Up Providence, a snobby blowhard and know-it-all, Hugh has a tendency to critique plays and novels without having any exposure to the material. He's constantly at odds with Mike during his segments, as it sometimes leads to on-air humiliation. It is later revealed that he is gay and HIV-positive, and he subsequently becomes a patient of Deirdre's.
- Sarah Abrell as Pia Bismark, the alternate host of Wake Up Providence, though at times frazzled by Mike's stunts, Pia is far more congenial and easygoing.
- Dakin Matthews as Dr. Harold Stratford, Mike and Richard's father, Harold is a stuffy, well-established heart surgeon who disapproves of Mike's choice to be a general practitioner of medicine, as well as Richard's sexual orientation.
- Inga Swenson as Connie Stratford, Mike and Richard's mother, an excellent nurse, Connie longs to return to her profession, even to the point where she works briefly with Mike as his nurse. Unfazed by Mike's goofy nature, she usually responds in kind, and is far more accepting of her son Richard being gay.

== Production ==
The crew list includes Peter Bonerz and James Widdoes.

The music for the opening titles was the rock and roll song "Good Lovin'", written by Ahmet Ertegün, Leroy Kirkland, Jesse Stone, and Danny Taylor. It begins with the bass vocal singing "D-D-D-D-Doctor, Doctor, D-D-D-D-Doc."

== Episodes ==
Season	Episodes	Originally released	
Season	Episodes	First released	Last released
1	6	June 12, 1989	July 24, 1989
2	15	November 13, 1989	August 27, 1990
3	19	September 19, 1990	July 6, 1991

== Backstory ==
Coming from a family of medical professionals, Mike Stratford first befriended Abe Butterfield while attending Harvard Medical School. Aware of his need for a study group, Abe invited Mike to join his, where Mike met Grant Linowitz, Deirdre Bennett, and Peter Balcovske. At first, Mike got off to a bad start with the group with his apparent lack of preparation, and nervous habit of clowning around. Mike's medical skill was soon made evident when he quickly came to the aid of Belkovske, the study group leader, who was having an epileptic attack and eventually dropped out of medical school.

Wanting to avoid the pitfalls of working in HMOs, the four decided to start a practice together after graduation. This decision initially led to conflicts as Mike's approach to medicine conflicted with his partners', particularly Grant's. The conflicts increased as he started a promotional campaign for his first novel, Panacea, and began doing medical segments for the local morning news show Wake Up, Providence.

Mike made his first appearance on Wake Up, Providence only to promote his new novel. He soon found himself bickering with host Hugh Persons during the live broadcast as it was plain to see that Hugh was attempting to fake his critique when he had never read the book. Producer Elizabeth McQueen liked his style (and that someone finally took the pompous host down a peg or two), and offered him a spot on the show. Though Mike tries to cover serious medical issues in his segments on Wake Up Providence, they usually devolve into unplanned lunacy, which only endears him more to his viewers, and even raises the show's ratings, much to Hugh's dismay.

Elizabeth: The kids at the hospital love you. They call you Dr. Doofus.
Hugh: [amused] "Dr. Doofus!" Children have such insight.

After Elizabeth's departure from the show, Mike finds himself fending off requests to do "disease of the week" pieces, or even to promote products such as a "Miracle Slimming Supplement".

== Awards and nominations ==
Year	Award	Category
1990	GLAAD Media Awards	Outstanding Comedy Series
1991	GLAAD Media Awards	Outstanding Comedy Series
