= Brian O'Connor (actor) =

American actor

- Born: Brian Edward O'Connor; February 14, 1953 (age 73); Lynnfield, Massachusetts, U.S.
- Other name: Brian Brucker O'Connor
- Occupations: Actor; comedian; guidance counselor; musician
- Years active: 1986–present
- Spouse: Jane Brucker (m. 1986; div. 1993)
- Children: 1

Brian Edward O'Connor (born February 14, 1953), known professionally as Brian Brucker O'Connor or Brian O'Connor, is an American actor, comedian, guidance counselor, and musician. His best known roles include Biddle in Beverly Hills Cop II (1987) and Schemer on Shining Time Station (1989–1993).

== Career ==
O'Connor graduated from the University of Massachusetts in 1975 to pursue a career in acting. Arriving in Boston, he co-founded the comedy troupe Slap Happy, along with fellow UMass alum Allan Jacobs. Joined by Jeff Ernstoff and Jan Kirschner, the group toured the nation and reached over 200 universities, receiving critical praise for performances in Boston, Cambridge and New York City. During the Slap Happy tour, O'Connor participated in a Ford's Theatre production of the Andrew Lloyd Webber musical Joseph and the Amazing Technicolor Dreamcoat.

O'Connor made his onscreen debut with the recorded-live sketch comedy special National Lampoon's Class of '86 (1986). He followed this with a guest appearance on Miami Vice and his feature film debut in Beverly Hills Cop II (1987) as Biddle. He returned to New York in 1988 to perform a one-man show ("One Hour Out of Your Life") at the Judith Anderson Theatre, earning praise from The New York Times' Stephen Holden.

In 1989, O'Connor was cast as Horace Schemer on Shining Time Station (1989–1993); the character, known commonly as "Schemer", proved to be his signature role. The roguish and clumsy, but still caring, character quickly grew in popularity with audiences. Since the show's cancellation, O'Connor has made numerous public appearances as Schemer.

Following his appearance in the indie comedy film Terrorists (2004), Mr. O'Connor performed in the 2005 Geva Theatre Center production of the solo play The Race of the Ark Tattoo. Shortly thereafter, he went back to school to become certified as a children's guidance counselor.

In 2016, O'Connor became the vocalist and co-guitarist for independent band The 6660s.

== Personal life ==
O'Connor was born into a Roman Catholic family of Irish descent, the third of five children. He was married for seven years to actress Jane Brucker, best known for portraying Lisa Houseman in Dirty Dancing (1987); they have a daughter, Sally (born 1989). O'Connor and Brucker appeared in the same 1986 episode of Miami Vice ("Baby Blues"), although their characters did not share scenes.

== Filmography ==
=== Film ===
Year	Title	Role	Notes
1986	Class of '86	Various characters	Direct-to-video
1987	Beverly Hills Cop II	Biddle	
1987	Deadly Prey	Soldier	
1987	Mankillers	Special CIA Agent	
1988	Death Chase	Game Player	
1988	Night Wars	Trent Matthews	
1989	Order of the Eagle	Robert Logan	
1989	Future Force	Attacker #2	
2004	Terrorists	Butch	

=== Television ===
Year	Title	Role	Notes
1986	Miami Vice	Detective Patterson	Episode: "Baby Blues"
1987	Mike's Talent Show	Stubby Malone	Television film
1988	Tattinger's	—N/a	Episode: "Two Men and a Baby"
1989	Starting Now	Bing Taylor	Television film
1989–1993	Shining Time Station	Horace Schemer, Jebediah Schemer	64 episodes Also writer
1990	Random Acts of Variety	Host, various roles	1 episode
1990	Shining Time Station: 'Tis a Gift	Schemer	Television film
1991	Real Mature	Various characters	Television film
1993	Rumor Has It	Himself (host)	
1993–1994	Schemer Presents!	Schemer	10 episodes
1994	Schemer Presents: The World According to Me	Schemer	Direct-to-video
1995	Shining Time Station: Once Upon a Time	Schemer	Television film
1995	Shining Time Station: Second Chances	Schemer	Television film
1995	Shining Time Station: One of the Family	Schemer	Television film
1995	Shining Time Station: Queen for a Day	Schemer	Television film
1995	The Weinerville Chanukah Special	Antidorkus	Television film
1997	Sports Kabob	Various characters	TV series short Also director
