= Health hazards of air travel =

A number of possible health hazards of air travel have been investigated.

== Infection ==
On an airplane, people sit in a confined space for extended periods of time, which increases the risk of transmission of airborne infections. For this reason, airlines place restrictions on the travel of passengers with known airborne contagious diseases (e.g. tuberculosis). During the severe acute respiratory syndrome (SARS) epidemic of 2003, awareness of the possibility of acquisition of infection on a commercial aircraft reached its zenith when on one flight from Hong Kong to Beijing, 16 of 120 people on the flight developed proven SARS from a single index case.

There is very limited research done on contagious diseases on aircraft. The two most common respiratory pathogens to which air passengers are exposed are parainfluenza and influenza. In one study, the flight ban imposed following the attacks of September 11, 2001 was found to have restricted the global spread of seasonal influenza, resulting in a much milder influenza season that year, and the ability of influenza to spread on aircraft has been well documented. There is no data on the relative contributions of large droplets, small particles, close contact, surface contamination, and no data on the relative importance of any of these methods of transmission for specific diseases, and therefore very little information on how to control the risk of infection. There is no standardisation of air handling by aircraft, installation of HEPA filters or of hand washing by air crew, and no published information on the relative efficacy of any of these interventions in reducing the spread of infection.

Air travel, like other forms of travel, radically increases the speed at which infections spread around the world, as viruses rapidly spread to large numbers of people living across the world. Human and cargo traffic greatly facilitates the spread of pathogens across the world, for example during the COVID-19 pandemic.

== Deep vein thrombosis ==
Deep vein thrombosis (DVT) is the third most common vascular disease next to stroke and heart attack. It is estimated that DVT affects one in 5,000 travellers on long flights. Risk increases with exposure to more flights within a short time frame and with increasing duration of flights. According to a health expert in Canada, even though the risk of a blood clot is low, given the number of people who fly, it is a public health risk. It is reported in 2016 that the average distance between seat rows has declined to 79 centimetres (31 in), from over 89 centimetres (35 in), while the average seat size has shrunk to 43 centimetres (17 in) from 46 centimetres (18 in) in the previous two decades.

== Radiation exposure ==
Flying 12 km (39,000 ft) high, passengers and crews of jet airliners are exposed to at least 10 times the cosmic ray dose that people at sea level receive, increasing their radiation exposure. Every few years, a geomagnetic storm permits a solar particle event to penetrate down to jetliner altitudes. Aircraft flying polar routes near the geomagnetic poles are at particular risk.

== Other possible health hazards ==
Other possible hazards of air travel that have been investigated include airsickness and chemical contamination of cabin air.

== In pregnancy ==
In low risk pregnancies, most health care providers approve flying until about 36 weeks of gestational age. Most airlines allow pregnant women to fly short distances at less than 36 weeks, and long distances at less than 32 weeks. Many airlines require a doctor's note that approves flying, specially at over 28 weeks.

== See also ==
- Air safety
- Aviation medicine
- Fear of flying
- Jet lag
- Shame of flying
- Travel medicine
