= Fear of flying =

Fear of being in an aircraft whilst in flight

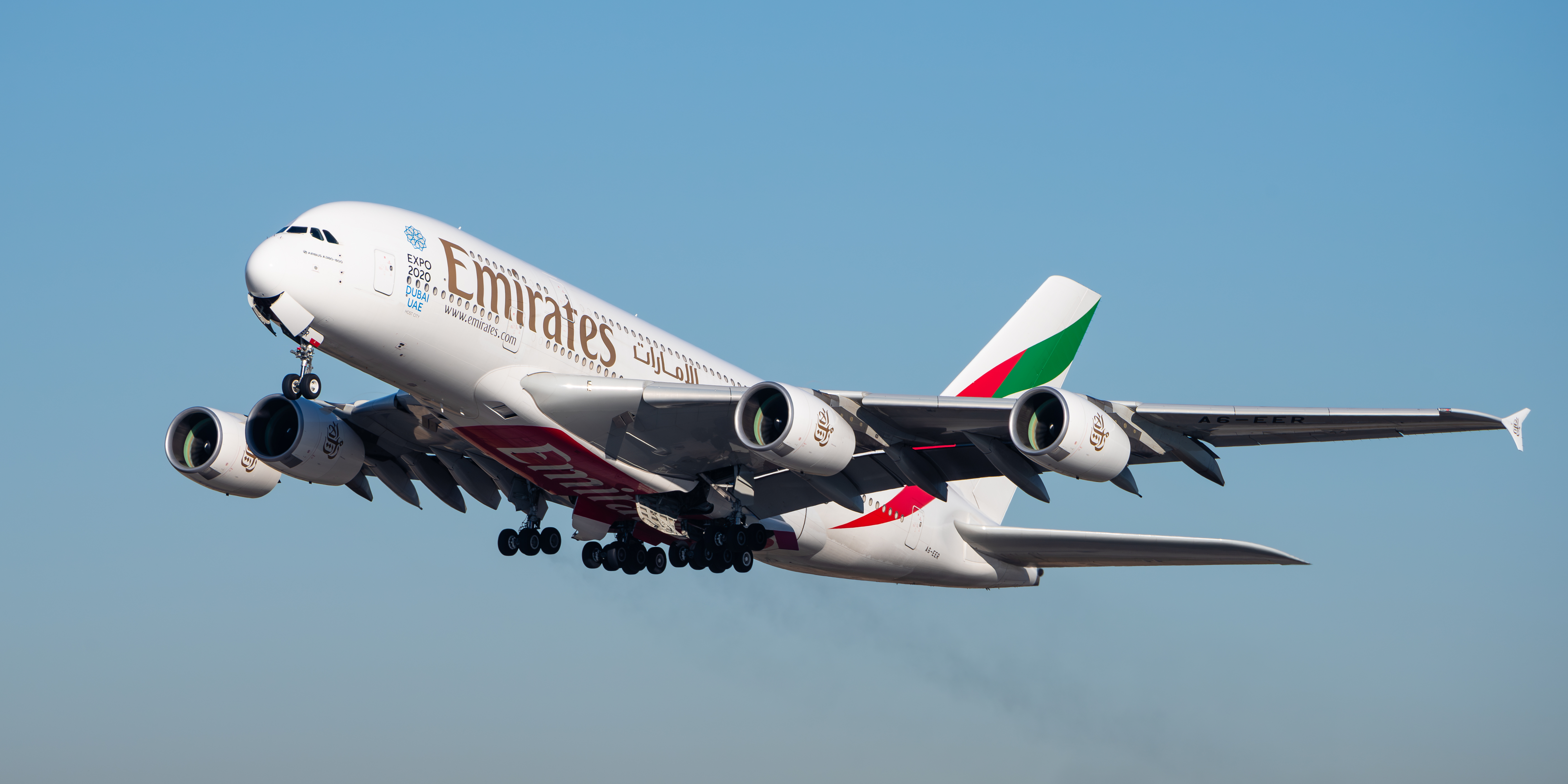
An Emirates A380-861

Fear of flying is the fear of being on an aircraft, such as an airplane or helicopter, while it is in flight. It is also referred to as flying anxiety, flying phobia, flight phobia, aviophobia, aerophobia, pteromechanophobia, or pteromerhanophobia (although aerophobia also means a fear of drafts or of fresh air, especially in rabies patients).

Acute anxiety caused by flying can be treated with anti-anxiety medication. The condition can be treated with exposure therapy, which works better when combined with cognitive behavioral therapy.

== Signs and symptoms ==
People with fear of flying experience intense, persistent fear or anxiety when they consider flying, as well as during flying. They will avoid flying if they can, and the fear, anxiety, and avoidance cause significant distress and impair their ability to function. Take-off, bad weather, and turbulence appear to be the most anxiety-provoking aspects of flying.

The most extreme manifestations can include panic attacks or vomiting at the mere sight or mention of an aircraft or air travel.

Around 60% of people with fear of flying report having some other anxiety disorder.

== Cause ==
The causes of flight phobia and the mechanisms by which it is maintained were not well understood as of 2016. It is not clear if it is really one condition; it appears to be heterogenous. It appears that some people get aerophobia from being or having claustrophobia to the small spaces inside the fuselage of the plane or helicopter. Though plane crashes are highly unusual, the fear of them may induce symptoms as well.

== Diagnosis ==
Fear of flying is a specific phobia classified as such in the DSM-5.

The diagnosis is clinical. It is often difficult to determine if the specific phobia of fear of flight should be the primary diagnosis, or if fear of flying is a symptom of a generalized anxiety disorder or another anxiety disorder such as agoraphobia or claustrophobia.

== Management ==
Acute anxiety caused by flying can be treated with anti-anxiety medication. The condition can be treated with exposure therapy, including use of virtual reality equipment, which works better when combined with cognitive behavioral therapy. Relaxation techniques and education about aviation safety can also be helpful in combination with other approaches.

A new and advanced treatment for aviophobia is virtual reality exposure therapy. This type of treatment uses computer technology where the patient enters a virtual reality of flying.

=== Virtual reality exposure therapy ===
Effective treatment for phobias such as fear of flying would be one that activates and modifies the fear structure. Activation of the fear structure can be achieved by exposing the patient to the feared stimuli, flying in this case, to elicit the fearful response. Modification of the fear structure can be achieved by the processes of habituation and extinction after eliciting the fearful response several times. A new and advanced treatment for aviophobia is virtual reality exposure therapy (VRET). This type of treatment uses computer technology where the patient virtually experiences flying. This experience includes visual, auditory, and motion stimuli to imitate flying in a plane as close as possible. Unlike an actual flight where survival depends upon others, virtual exposure involves no risk. The patient is free to exit at any moment. Though it can be argued that vivo exposure treatment in which patients take actual flights is more effective, VRET providers claim it is more cost-effective, accessible, less time-consuming, and requires less organization. Another advantage of VRET over vivo exposure treatment is that it focuses on the main reason that elicits fear of flying easily. For example, if the patient's most anxiety-inducing-component is takeoff, in VRET the patient would be exposed to a plane takeoff repeatedly while in vivo exposure the patient would have to wait for the plane to land and then take off again.

== Outcomes ==
Studies of interventions like cognitive behavioral therapy have reported rates of reduction in anxiety of around 80%; however, there is little evidence that any treatment can eliminate fear of flying.

== Epidemiology ==
Estimates for prevalence have ranged between 2.5% and 40%; estimates on the lower end are probably generated through studies where the condition is diagnosed by a professional, and the higher end probably includes people who have diagnosed themselves. A 2025 YouGov survey found that 49% of American air travelers reported some degree of nervousness about flying, with 18% describing themselves as "afraid".

== History ==
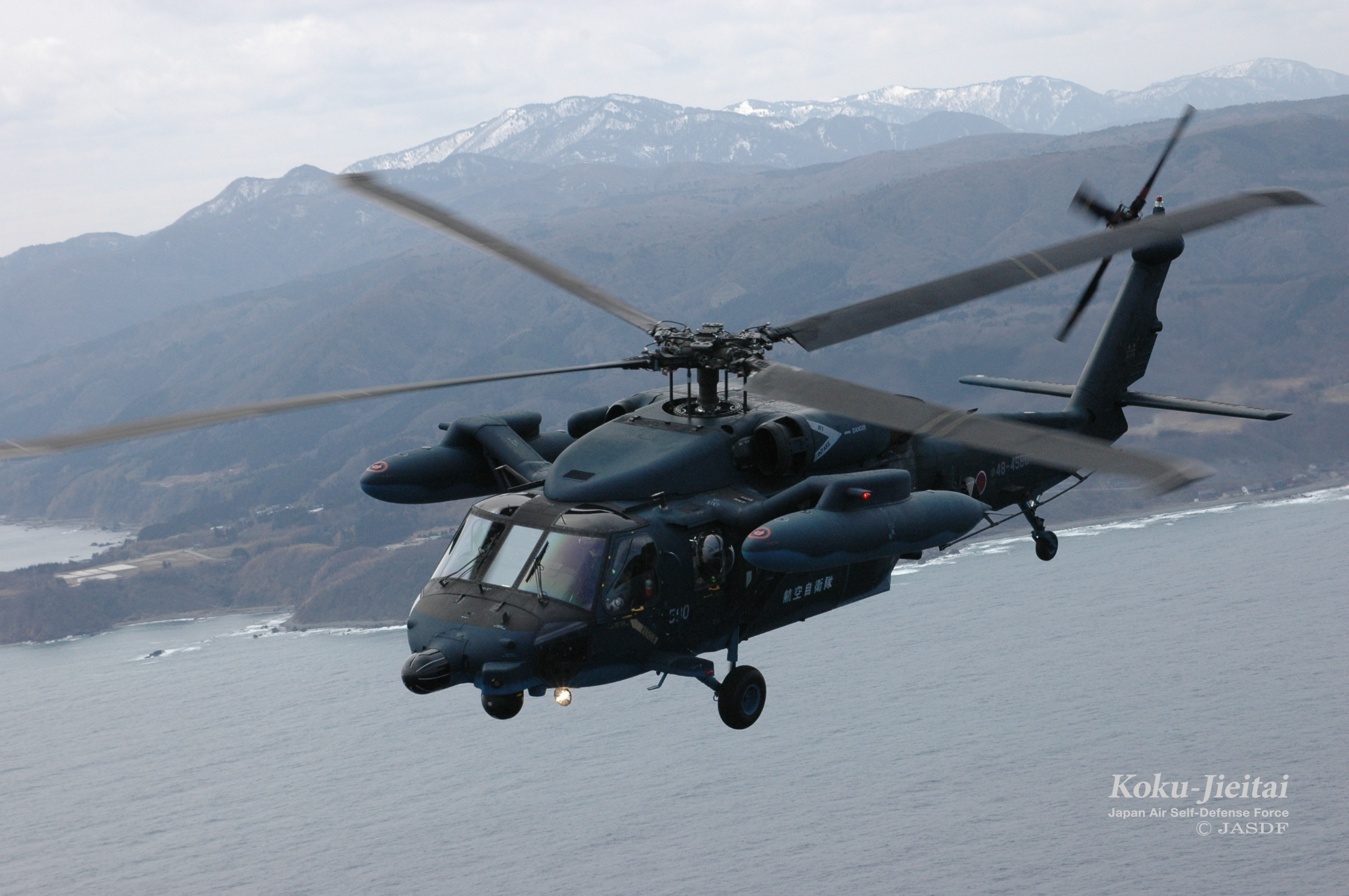
A JASDF UH-60J Black Hawk

Fear of flying was first discussed in the biomedical literature by a doctor in the UK at the end of World War I, who called it "aero-neurosis" and was describing pilots and crew who were or became anxious about flying. It was not much discussed until the 1950s and rise of commercial air travel and the vogue in psychoanalysis. Starting in the 1970s fear of flying was addressed through behavioral and cognitive approaches.

Following the September 11 attacks, Americans chose to travel more by car instead of flying; because of the extra traffic, around 350 more people died in traffic accidents than would have normally occurred.

A number of celebrities have suffered from a fear of flying, including former Arsenal FC and Netherlands footballer Dennis Bergkamp, famously dubbed the "non-flying Dutchman", Agnetha Fältskog, Travis Barker, who got into a plane crash in 2008, and early rock artist Ritchie Valens, who died in a plane crash less than a year into his fame. British comedian Lee Mack has expressed his fear of flying publicly; an episode of his sitcom Not Going Out entitled "Plane" is in reference to his fear of flying. Danish filmmaker Lars von Trier has made multiple films set in the United States but has never travelled there due to his fear of flying. David Bowie also expressed a fear of flying.

== Research directions ==
As of 2016, the causes of fear of flying as well as the psychological mechanisms through which it persists had not been well researched. A few studies had looked at whether mechanisms like illusory correlation and expectancy bias were present in all or most people with fear of flying as well as other specific phobias; these studies have not led to clear outcomes.

Research into the most effective ways to treat or manage fear of flying is difficult (as it is with other counselling or behavioral interventions) due to the inability to include a placebo or other control arm in such studies.

== See also ==
- List of phobias
- Hodophobia - The phobia of travel
- Health hazards of air travel
- Flight shame
