= Laurie Bembenek =

Former policewoman and convicted murderer

- Born: Lawrencia Ann Bembenek; August 15, 1958; Milwaukee, Wisconsin, U.S.
- Died: November 20, 2010 (aged 52); Portland, Oregon, U.S.
- Other names: Bambi Bembenek, Jennifer Gazzana
- Spouses: Elfred Schultz (m. 1981; div. 1984) Marty Carson (m. 2005; div. 2007)
- Status: Released November 1992
- Convictions: Life (1982 verdict); 20 years (1992 verdict)
- Criminal charges: First degree murder (1982 charge); Second degree murder (1992 charge)
- Capture status: Released on December 9, 1992
- Time at large: 95 days
- Escaped: July 15, 1990
- Escape end: October 17, 1990

Details
- Victims: 1
- Date: May 28, 1981; 2:15am
- Country: United States
- State: Wisconsin
- Location: Milwaukee
- Killed: 1
- Weapon: .38 caliber pistol
- Date apprehended: July 24, 1982
- Imprisoned at: Taycheedah Correctional Institution

Lawrencia Ann "Bambi" Bembenek (August 15, 1958 – November 20, 2010), known as Laurie Bembenek, was an American security officer at Marquette University when she was arrested on charges of first-degree murder of Christine Schultz in Milwaukee, Wisconsin, on May 28, 1981. Bembenek was convicted and sentenced in 1982 to life in prison.

Schultz was the ex-wife of Elfred O. "Fred" Schultz, a veteran officer with the Milwaukee Police Department. They had been married for several years and had two sons together when they divorced in November 1980. Bembenek and Fred Schultz married in January 1981 in Illinois, but the marriage was ruled invalid because Wisconsin does not allow remarriage less than six months after divorce. The couple officially remarried in November 1981, after Christine Schultz had been murdered.

The elements of the case made it a sensation, garnering national attention during the trial. In 1984 Bembenek and Fred Schultz divorced. In prison she completed a bachelor's degree.

She gained even more media notice in 1990 after she escaped from Taycheedah Correctional Institution in Wisconsin. After three months, she and her fiancé were captured in Thunder Bay, Ontario, Canada. (This episode inspired books, movies, and the slogan "Run, Bambi, Run".)

Upon winning a new trial, Bembenek pleaded no contest to second-degree murder in exchange for reduced prison time. Ballistics tests had appeared to establish her husband's gun as the murder weapon, and she had access to it.

In December 1992 Bembenek was sentenced to time served and ten years' probation. For years, she sought to have her sentence overturned. With the revelation of new evidence about the lack of her DNA at the scene, a ballistics test showing the murder weapon was different than Schultz's gun, and evidence of an unknown male at the victim's house, Bembenek sought to have her conviction overturned. Appeals were unsuccessful because of her nolo contendere plea.

Bembenek had graduated from the police academy and served briefly with the Milwaukee Police Department (MPD), before being fired in August 1980 during her probationary period. She sued the department, claiming that its officers engaged in sexual discrimination and other illegal activities, but the investigation did not uphold her complaint.

Two years after gaining freedom in November 1992, Bembenek moved to Vancouver, Washington, where her parents lived. She worked at volunteer and paying jobs and married again. On November 20, 2010, Bembenek died at a hospice facility in Portland, Oregon, at age 52.

== Early life ==
Lawrencia Ann Bembenek was the youngest of three girls; she was born on August 15, 1958, to Joseph and Virginia Bembenek in Milwaukee, Wisconsin. Her father Joseph had worked for the Milwaukee Police Department (MPD) but quit after witnessing what he described as corruption there. He later worked as a carpenter.

Raised Catholic, Bembenek attended St. Augustine's Elementary School and St. Mary's Academy in Milwaukee. She later transferred to Bay View High School, where she graduated in 1976. Bembenek attended Bryant & Stratton College in Virginia Beach, Virginia, where she earned an associate degree in fashion merchandising management.

== Career and marriage ==
After college, Bembenek returned to Milwaukee, where she worked in retail and had a brief stint as a model. In 1978, she appeared as "Miss March" in a calendar distributed by the Joseph Schlitz Brewing Company.

In March 1980, Bembenek began training at the Milwaukee police academy. While still a trainee, she was accused by an anonymous tipster of smoking marijuana at a party. Bembenek denied the charge, which was investigated but never substantiated.

While still at the academy, Bembenek met and became close with Judy Zess, another female trainee. Bembenek graduated from the academy in the summer of 1980 and was assigned to the MPD's South Side Second District.

In her autobiography Woman on the Run (1992), Bembenek later claimed that the MPD was then composed of "brutal, lazy, apathetic and corrupt" police officers. She also said that female and minority officers were routinely subjected to harassment and abuse during training. Bembenek also said that when female and minority trainees joined the department, they were routinely punished or even fired for minor infractions during their probationary period, while white male officers went unpunished for more serious offenses.

At a rock concert in May 1980, Zess was arrested for smoking marijuana. This violated her probation as a new officer and she was fired. Bembenek was dismissed from the Milwaukee Police Department on August 25, 1980, because of her involvement in filing a false report related to Zess's May arrest.

After being fired, Bembenek discovered scandalous photos of several veteran MPD officers, including Elfred O. "Fred" Schultz (her future husband), dancing nude on picnic tables in Gordon Park, after drinking at a nearby tavern. She took the pictures to the federal Equal Employment Opportunity Commission (EEOC), where she argued that she had been dismissed for a minor infraction, but the male police officers were committing more serious violations (as shown in the photos), and did so with impunity. The EEOC encouraged Bembenek to file a discrimination report with the MPD's internal affairs division.

Later, Bembenek briefly worked as a waitress at the Playboy Club in Lake Geneva. Around this time, Bembenek met Fred Schultz, who was already a thirteen-year veteran of the MPD.

Schultz divorced his wife, Christine, in November 1980. They had two young sons, Sean and Shannon. She had custody of the boys.

Bembenek and Schultz married in January 1981 in Waukegan, Illinois. They shared an apartment with her friend Judy Zess, and Zess's boyfriend Thomas D. Gaertner.

Bembenek began working as a personal trainer at a health club. By May 1981 she was working as a campus security officer at Marquette University in Milwaukee.

A judge ruled the Schultz couple's marriage was invalid, stating that Schultz had violated Wisconsin law by not waiting six months after his divorce to remarry. Bembenek and Schultz married again in November 1981.

== Murder of Christine Schultz ==
On May 28, 1981, at approximately 2:15 a.m., Christine J. (Pennings) Schultz was murdered in her Milwaukee home. She was shot point blank into her back through her heart by a single shot from a .38 caliber pistol. Christine was gagged and blindfolded, and her hands were tied in front of her with a clothes line.

Her two sons, Sean and Shannon, then 11 and 7 years old, were asleep in the house when the assailant entered their room. They found their mother face down on her bed and bleeding. The older boy, Sean, saw the assailant, which he described as a masked male figure in a green army jacket and black shoes. He also said the man had a long (approx. 6" or 15 cm) reddish-colored ponytail.

Christine and Fred Schultz had been divorced six months when she was killed. Fred Schultz initially said he was on duty investigating a burglary with his partner, Michael Durfee, at the time of the murder. Years later he admitted the two men were drinking at a local bar.

When ballistics testing allegedly revealed that his off-duty revolver was the murder weapon, suspicion shifted to Bembenek. She had been alone at home, in the apartment she shared with Fred Schultz. She had access to both the gun and a key to Christine's house, which Fred Schulz had secretly copied from his oldest son's house key. After the police investigated, they arrested Bembenek for Christine Schultz's murder on June 24, 1981.

Fred Schultz had previously been investigated in the fatal shooting of a Glendale, Wisconsin, police officer, George Robert Sassan, on July 23, 1975. Sassan had arrested a subject in a bar while off-duty. Milwaukee police officers, including Schultz, responded to the call in suburban Glendale (outside of their jurisdiction), reportedly mistook Sassan for a suspect, and fatally shot him when he turned toward them, holding a gun. Schultz and his partner were cleared in the shooting, exonerated by the Milwaukee County District Attorney's Office.

=== Trial and conviction ===
Bembenek's trial generated tremendous publicity. Newspapers began referring to her as "Bambi" Bembenek (a nickname she disliked). The prosecution portrayed Bembenek as a loose woman addicted to expensive living who wanted Christine Schultz dead so that her new husband would no longer have to pay alimony and child support.

Noting that Bembenek had financial problems, the prosecution claimed that she was the only person with the motive and means to carry out the crime. The gun used to kill Christine was Bembenek's husband's off-duty revolver; the prosecution claimed Bembenek was the only person besides Schultz who had access to the gun, which had blood on it. Bembenek supposedly also had access to a key to Christine's home. There were no signs of a break-in and no valuables taken. These were all elements of circumstantial evidence.

The strongest evidence, however, was two human hairs found at the crime scene, which matched ones taken from the hairbrush of the defendant. But Schultz's eldest son, an eyewitness, said he could not identify Bembenek as the person he had seen in the house and who shot his mother. Bembenek had dyed blonde hair, weighed 140 pounds and was 5 ft 10 in (1.78 m).

Prosecution witnesses testified that Bembenek had spoken often of killing Christine. The prosecution produced a witness who said Bembenek offered to pay him to carry out the murder. According to witnesses for the prosecution, Bembenek owned a green jogging suit similar to the one described by Schultz's son. Other evidence was her owning a clothes line and a blue bandanna similar to what were used to bind and gag the victim. A reddish-brown wig found in the plumbing system of Bembenek's apartment matched fibers found at the murder scene. A boutique employee testified that Bembenek had purchased such a wig shortly before the murder.

On March 9, 1982, the jury found Bembenek guilty of first-degree murder; she was sentenced to life in prison. She was imprisoned at the Taycheedah Correctional Institution in Fond du Lac, Wisconsin.

== Post-trial publicity, events and appeals ==
While Fred Schultz had initially stood by Bembenek, claiming she was innocent, he later changed his mind and in 1989 publicly stated that he believed she was "guilty as sin." They had been divorced in 1984. Bembenek in turn came to believe that Schultz was guilty of having hired a man named Freddy Horenberger to murder Christine, and allowed Bembenek to take the fall.

Horenberger, along with an accomplice, had been questioned days before the murder by a deputy with the Milwaukee County Sheriff's Office about an unrelated crime. Horenberger had briefly worked with Fred Schultz on a remodeling project. He was also a former boyfriend of Judy Zess, who testified for the prosecution against Bembenek. A disguised Horenberger had robbed and beaten Zess several weeks prior to Christine Schulz's murder. Later he was convicted for that crime and sentenced to ten years in prison.

Bembenek contended that the attorney whom her husband had hired to represent her had a conflict of interest. Her attorneys said that the first attorney purposely failed to inform the jury that there was evidence connecting her husband Schultz to his ex-wife's murder.

After her imprisonment, Bembenek filed three unsuccessful appeals of her conviction, citing police errors in handling of key evidence. She also noted the fact that one of the prosecution's witnesses, Judy Zess, had recanted her testimony, stating it was made under duress. Bembenek and her supporters also alleged that the MPD may have singled her out for prosecution because of her role as a key witness in a federal investigation into police corruption. Bembenek's supporters agreed with her claim that Horenberger, at the behest of Fred Schulz, had murdered Christine.

Following Bembenek's conviction, numerous affidavits were filed that alleged that, while imprisoned, Horenberger boasted to other inmates of having killed Christine Schulz. However, he publicly denied any involvement in the murder until his alleged suicide in November 1991. This followed his participation in a robbery and hostage situation.

Questions were raised as to the accuracy of evidence used in the Bembenek trial. Dr. Elaine Samuels, the medical examiner who conducted the autopsy, had originally concluded that hairs recovered from Christine's body were consistent with those of Christine Schulz herself. The hair evidence was also examined by Diane Hanson, a hair analyst from a crime lab in Madison, Wisconsin, and prosecution witness. She said that two of the hairs were consistent with samples taken from Bembenek's hairbrush.

But, Dr. Samuels refuted that claim. In a 1983 letter, published in the "Toronto Star" in 1991, she stated that,

I recovered no blonde or red hairs of any length or texture...[A]ll of the hairs I recovered from the body were brown and were grossly identical to the hair of the victim...[I] do not like to suggest that evidence was altered in any way, but I can find no logical explanation for what amounted to the appearance of blonde hair in an envelope that contained no such hair at the time it was sealed by me.

The apartment where Bembenek and Schultz lived shared drainage with another apartment. A brownish-red wig was found in the drainpipe, which matched some of the hairs found on the victim's body. The woman who occupied the other apartment testified that Zess had knocked on her door and asked to use her bathroom; after Zess used the woman's bathroom, the plumbing was clogged. Zess had also admitted to owning a brownish-red wig.

== Bembenek's prison years ==
About a year after she went to prison, on June 28, 1983, Bembenek filed for divorce from Fred Schultz. In an interview she gave to The Milwaukee Sentinel earlier that year, Bembenek said that Fred had written her a letter saying that he was living with a 19-year-old woman in Florida and had decided to end their marriage. Their divorce was granted on June 19, 1984.

While in prison, Bembenek earned a bachelor's degree from the University of Wisconsin–Parkside. She also helped found a prisoners' newspaper. She met and became engaged to factory worker Dominic Gugliatto, brother of her cellmate.

== Escape and capture ==
On July 15, 1990, Bembenek escaped through a laundry room window and was picked up by her fiancé, Gugliatto. The couple was spotted in Wauwatosa, Wisconsin, two days after Bembenek's escape, driving in Gugliatto's truck. The abandoned truck was later found in a parking lot of a Target.

Bembenek and Gugliatto fled to Thunder Bay, Ontario, while sensational stories about their relationship swirled through American tabloids. Her escape also reignited publicity surrounding her case, and she became something of a folk hero. A song was written about her, and t-shirts were sold with the slogan "Run, Bambi, Run".

While on the run, Bembenek used the name "Jennifer Gazzana" and got a job working as a waitress. The couple evaded capture for three months. She also worked as a fitness instructor.

On October 17, 1990, the couple was arrested after a tourist saw a segment about Bembenek's escape on America's Most Wanted TV series. Gugliatto was deported to the United States a month later and was eventually sentenced to one year in prison for his role in the escape.

Bembenek sought refugee status in Canada, claiming that she was being persecuted by a conspiracy between the police department and the judicial system in Wisconsin. The Canadian government showed some sympathy for her case. Before returning her to Wisconsin, it obtained a commitment that Milwaukee officials would conduct a judicial review of her case. Although the review did not find evidence of crimes by police or prosecutors, it did list seven major police blunders that had occurred during the Christine Schultz murder investigation.

As a result, Bembenek won the right to a new trial. Bembenek voluntarily returned to the United States on April 22, 1991. Rather than risk a second conviction and in order to get out of prison earlier, she pleaded no contest (nolo contendere) to second-degree murder during a hearing held on December 9, 1992.

Bembenek was sentenced to 20 years, which was commuted to time served. She was released from custody three hours after the hearing, having served a little more than ten years.

== Life after prison ==
Bembenek wrote a book about her experience, titled Woman on Trial (1993). After her release, she had various legal and personal problems: she was arrested again on possession of marijuana and filed for bankruptcy.

She was diagnosed with hepatitis C, which she had acquired from her mother at birth, and had other liver and kidney problems. She admitted to being an alcoholic. She legally changed her name to Laurie Bembenek in July 1994.

In 1996, she moved to Washington state to be near her retired parents in Vancouver, Washington. There she met U.S. Forest Service employee Marty Carson. They married in 2005.

Bembenek was diagnosed with post-traumatic stress disorder, complicated by a growing addiction to alcohol. Carson encouraged her to devote time to her passion of painting as a form of therapy. Bembenek had been painting since childhood, and her early work had been the subject of an exhibition at University of Wisconsin–Milwaukee in 1992. Carson constructed a studio for her, and she eagerly returned to her art. After several years she had amassed about 30 paintings, which she put on display at a local art gallery. The gallery burned down and she lost all the paintings.

In 2002, Bembenek either fell or jumped from a second-story window, breaking her leg so badly that it had to be amputated below the knee. Bembenek said that she had been held in an apartment by handlers in preparation for appearing on the Dr. Phil television show. A spokesman for the show said they intended to protect her from media harassment. Bembenek said the confinement felt too much like her time in solitary in prison; she tried to escape and suffered the injury. She sued Dr. Phil, Paramount and 52 staffers from the show.

Bembenek continued to proclaim her innocence, but the Wisconsin Supreme Court refused to overturn her "no contest plea", saying that such a plea cannot be withdrawn. In April 2008, Bembenek filed a petition with the United States Supreme Court, seeking a reversal of the second murder conviction. Bembenek's attorney pointed to evidence withheld in the original trial, including ballistics tests that showed the murder bullets did not match Fred Schultz's gun, male DNA found on the victim, evidence showing that the victim had been sexually assaulted, and the eyewitness testimony of the two young sons who claimed that the intruder was a heavyset, masked man. Bembenek's petition argued that the court needed to clarify whether defendants who plead guilty or no contest have the same right to review evidence as those who plead not guilty. Her appeal was denied in June 2008.

=== Death ===
On November 20, 2010, 52-year-old Bembenek died at a hospice facility in Portland, Oregon, from liver and kidney failure.

== Representation in other media ==
Her case inspired two television movies, a podcast and various books and articles.

- Woman on the Run: The Lawrencia Bembenek Story (1993) is an American drama film written and directed by Sandor Stern. It is adapted from Bembenek's memoir, Woman on Trial. It stars Tatum O'Neal and Bruce Greenwood.
- In 2004, MSNBC produced and aired a biography of Laurie Bembenek on their Headliners and Legends television show, but she did not participate.
- WTMJ-TV anchor Mike Jacobs had a two-part interview with Bembenek that aired on that station's 10 p.m. newscast on October 28 and 29, 2010.
- In April 2022, Apple Podcasts and Campside Media released the 8-part podcast series about Bembenek and her case. Run, Bambi, Run is hosted by Vanessa Grigoriadis. It is based in part on a book of the same name by Kris Radish.
- In September 2023, Gordon Gano and Eric Simonson wrote a musical about the life of Bembenek, Run, Bambi, Run at Milwaukee Rep in Downtown Milwaukee. The premiere featured Erika Olson as Laurie, Armando Gutierrez as Fred Schultz, Jess Kantorowitz as Judy, and Douglas Goodhart as Ira Robbins.

== Television media about Bembenek ==
- Calendar Girl, Cop, Killer? The Bambi Bembenek Story (1992), starring Lindsay Frost
- City Confidential Milwaukee: The Legend of Bambi Bembenek (Season 6, Episode 1 original air date on A&E Network 03/27/2002)
- Woman on the Run: The Lawrencia Bembenek Story (1993), starring Tatum O'Neal
- The Perfect Murder: Deadly Divorce (2015) original air date 07/01/15 on Investigation Discovery
- On the Case with Paula Zahn: Bambi Is Captured on Investigation Discovery]
- Vanity Fair Confidential: Was Bambi Framed? original air date 02/19/2018 on Investigation Discovery.
- The Playboy Murders: Run Bambi Run (2023) on Investigation Discovery

== See also ==
- Stephanie Lazarus, a policewoman convicted of murdering the wife of a man she had been in a relationship with.

== Bibliography ==
- Bembenek, Lawrencia (1992). Woman on Trial. New York: HarperPaperbacks. ISBN 978-0-06-100600-5.
- Douglas, John; Olshaker, Mark (2001). The Cases That Haunt Us: From Jack the Ripper to Jon Benet Ramsey, The FBI's Legendary Mindhunter Sheds New Light on the Mysteries That Won't Go Away. Simon and Schuster. ISBN 0-7432-1239-8.
- Horenberger, Francine (2002). Mistresses of Mayhem. Alpha Books. ISBN 0-7394-2867-5.
- Radish, Kris (1992). Run, Bambi, Run. Penguin Group USA. ISBN 0-451-40351-7.
