= Air India Flight 112 plot =

Alleged plot by Sikhs to blow up plane

Coordinates: 40.648°N 73.782°W

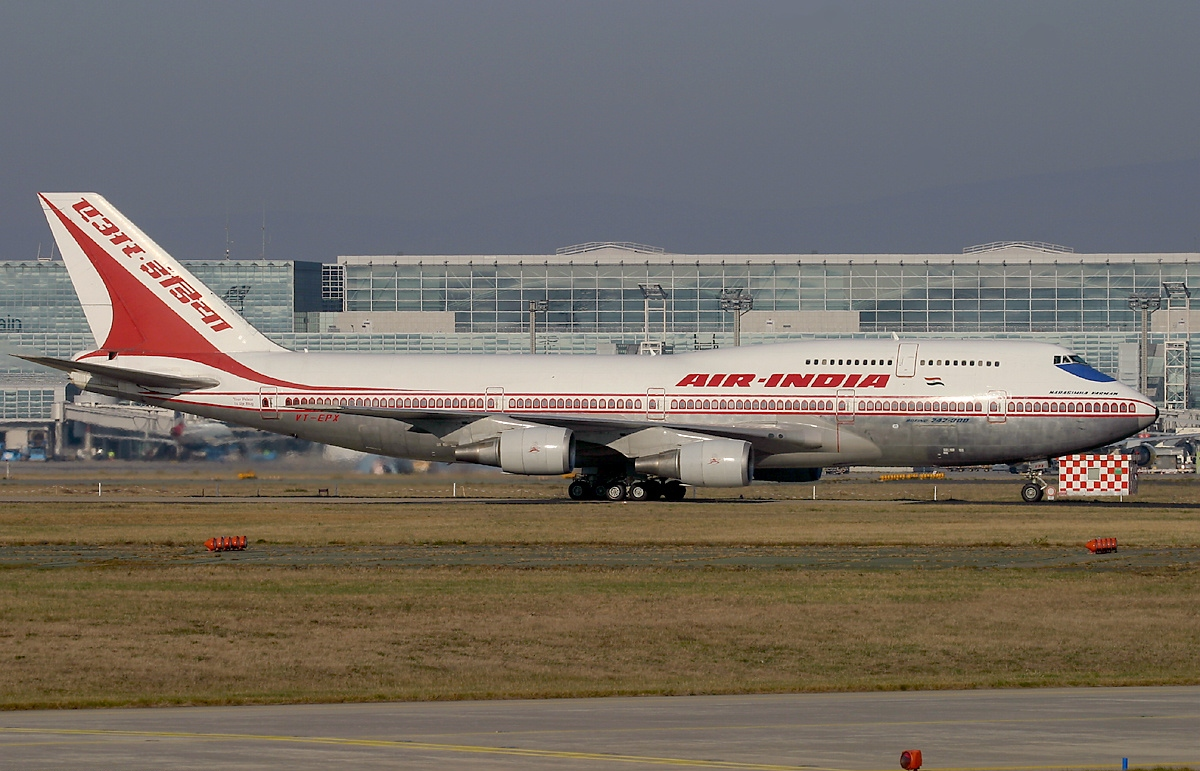

Occurrence
- Date: May 1986
- Summary: Failed terrorist plot
- Site: N/A
- Total fatalities: 0
- Total injuries: 0
- Total survivors: 0

In May 1986, five Canadian Sikh terrorists were charged with plotting to blow up Air India Flight 112 in New York City. Ostensibly members of Babbar Khalsa, two were convicted and given life sentences, while three others were released. However, years later, the courts overturned the sentences and freed the remaining two men noting that the government had failed to disclose "crucial evidence" about the alleged plot, and defence lawyers argued that the men had been entrapped by police agents who invited them to a meeting, then suggested the crime, and arrested them for showing signs of agreement.

With the arrests coming shortly after the bombing of Air India Flight 182 that killed 329 passengers, which included over 200 Canadians, the Solicitor General Perrin Beatty urged Canadians not to spread fear of terrorism.

== Arrests ==
Served six years in prison
Singh Santokh Khela, 24
Kashmir Singh Dhillon, 41
Released
Moninder Singh Anand, 21
Gurcharan Singh Banwait, 38
Chattar Singh Saini, 43

The government claimed that the idea for the alleged plot was hatched on April 4, and was targeting an Air India jet leaving John F. Kennedy International Airport on May 30 in New York. Each of the five men were from Montreal, Quebec, and it was later revealed that Khelsa had been under surveillance by Canadian Security Intelligence Service since at least May 1985, when they recorded a phone call he made to Tarwinder Singh Parmar.

A petty criminal codenamed "Billy Joe", with a record for drug trafficking, use of a firearm, kidnapping and assault, approached the Sûreté du Québec and told them that he'd gotten Maninder Anand to agree to buy a stolen Cadillac, and claimed that he'd heard colleagues talk about blowing up an Air India flight. With a long record of informing on his colleagues for the past 12 years, "Billy Joe" offered to get evidence against these Sikhs in exchange for the police dropping charges against one of his friends who was facing life imprisonment.

The case was largely built around an FBI mole, Frank Miele, who spoke to Khela and Dhillon in a bugged Montreal hotel room on May 19 and May 22, offering his services to them under the name of "George" at the urging of "Billy Joe", who had told them he was a member of the Mafia.

Dhillon was worried because Khela had given the American $6,500 for an ostensibly stolen Cadillac, and agreed to attend the meeting to try to make sure that his friend either had his money returned or got legitimate ownership papers on the car. Dhillon later recalled that the American began talking about "crazy things, like bombing an airplane, bombing embassies and buying arms", and that at their only other meeting three days later, he wrote a note insisting that Miele, who was now claiming to be an explosives expert as well as a car thief, not refer to any criminal activities, instead using code words to discuss his ideas, since he was suspicious this was a police sting operation. Miele later claimed that the men had indicated they were willing to pay 20 kilograms of heroin in exchange for him downing a plane.

On May 28, a week after meeting with Miele, Dhillon was recorded phoning Khelsa to express relief that the stranger seemed to be leaving them alone now, saying "we have nothing to do with him, we don't damn well know him". On the same day, the Royal Canadian Mounted Police and FBI claimed to have received a "tip" about a possible bombing plot by Montreal Sikhs, and the suspects were all arrested by the RCMP. However, although they were charged with possession of explosives, no sign of any explosives was found.

== Trial ==
All five were held in the Parthenais Detention Centre, and entered no plea before judge Jean Pierre Bonin at their preliminary hearing in the Court of Quebec at which they were represented by Robert Beaudet. Although the Sikh community rallied to present $2 million in bail for the arrested men, the request was denied at the urging of prosecutor Pierre Garon.

A month into the proceedings, three of the men were released, partially after it was revealed that several of the recorded conversations had been mistranslated by officials; when Saini telephoned Anand asking to purchase a 12-volt battery to build a light, the RCMP translators suggested he had asked for 12 pounds of explosives to build a bomb. Charges were simultaneously upgraded against Khela and Dhillon. The defence complained that "Billy Joe" was never called to testify, or be cross-examined, noting that he had started the entire process in motion. The RCMP claimed that he had disappeared, but that his alleged contact with them was simply to be taken for granted.

At trial, where they were represented by Michael Code, Khela was confronted with a recorded conversation he had with Miele, in which he was asked "...you want a 747?" and replied "yeah". He told the court that he was confused by the question and believed Miele was referring to a type of truck, and that his curt reply reflected the fact he did not understand much of what was going on since he spoke comparatively little English, and Miele was shouting "all the time". Dhillon later explained that Miele looked like a "pretty dangerous type of guy", and both men maintained that they understood the meeting was to discuss brokering a deal for stolen vehicles from the United States.

Dhillon was likewise confronted with a paper he had written entitled "Objects of the Sikh Youth of North America" which described his belief that all Sikhs should be trained in martial arts per the group's illustrious history.

In December, prosecutor Claude Parent was criticised for a "racist" question in which he demanded to know whether Khela "takes orders from his God". On December 12, the pair were both found guilty of conspiracy to commit mass murder, and shortly thereafter justice Claire Barrette-Joncas sentenced them to life imprisonment.

On March 6, 1992, their convictions were overturned by the appeals court; the government chose to appeal the overturn, and a new trial was ordered in November 1995. Ten months later, the charges were stayed by the Quebec Superior Court when it was revealed the government had failed to disclose crucial materials.

As of 2002, Khelsa claims he is still harassed by CSIS, that the Canadian spy agency disrupted his business and pushed him to give them inside information on Babbar Khalsa's activities in Canada.
