= Global alert =

Global alert is used as the global radio-communications network during times of international crises or threats to international security. Global Alerts are also issued by agencies such as the World Health Organization (WHO), when there is a perceived threat of an international pandemic, (global epidemic), such as the threat of a SARS, (Severe Acute Respiratory Syndrome), pandemic during March 2003, due to its high contagion level which was rapidly spread by travelers sharing international flights. The global alert released by the World Health Organization regarding the SARS outbreak and its rapid contagion saved many lives: The alert about the disease, precautionary measures, and preventive measures to be taken by individuals, including specific hygiene information needed to arrest the spread of SARS was communicated instantly throughout the world.

== Global Outbreak Alert & Response Network (GOARN) ==
GOARN is a system of cooperating institutions and networks that are constantly ready to respond to disease outbreaks. Established in 2000, it is a branch of the World Health Organization. GOARN's partners include the Red Cross and divisions of the United Nations such as UNICEF and UNHCR. In addition to providing aid to areas affected by disease outbreaks, GOARN also works to standardize protocols for medical response systems.
