= Deadliest Enemy =

2017 nonfiction public health book by Michael Osterholm and Mark Olshaker

Deadliest Enemy: Our War Against Killer Germs
- Authors: Michael T. Osterholm; Mark Olshaker
- Language: English
- Subject: Disease causation
- Publisher: Little, Brown and Company
- Publication date: March 2017
- Publication place: United States
- Pages: 352
- ISBN: 978-0-316-34369-5
- OCLC: 974489476
- Dewey Decimal: 614.4

Deadliest Enemy: Our War Against Killer Germs is a non-fiction book by epidemiologist Michael T. Osterholm and writer Mark Olshaker, that explores public health emergencies including antimicrobial resistance, emerging infectious disease, and the threat of an influenza pandemic. It proposes a nine-point "battle plan for survival" for dealing with these threats, including solutions to antimicrobial drug resistance.

The book also focuses on the epidemiology of HIV/AIDS, severe acute respiratory syndrome (SARS), Middle East respiratory syndrome (MERS), toxic shock syndrome, Zika, Ebola, bioterrorism, influenza research, and the antivaccine movement.

The book was first published in March 2017 by Little, Brown and Company.

== Synopsis ==
Michael Osterholm describes his book as "part history, part current affairs, and part blueprint for the future". Top of his concerns are influenza pandemics, antibiotic resistance and bioterrorism, combined with "no clear international governance structure for how we are going to deal with these issues". Focusing on major infectious diseases, he highlights the world's vulnerability to their emerging threats. His concerns include the effects of major outbreaks on medicine and vaccine production, should countries where these are produced be affected.

Content includes a chapter on coronaviruses titled, "SARS and MERS: Harbingers of Things to Come". Other chapters are on the HIV/AIDS, toxic shock syndrome, the 2015–16 Zika virus epidemic, and Ebola outbreaks, covering all the main outbreaks over the previous 30 years, including influenza bioterrorism, Gain-of-function research, influenza research, the antivaccine movement, and antimicrobial resistance. The concept of "game-changing influenza vaccines" is introduced in the chapter "Taking influenza off the table". This provides reasoning and mechanisms for developing vaccines. Solutions to antimicrobial drug resistance are suggested in the chapter titled "Fighting the resistance".

The authors divide infectious diseases into four classes: pathogens that have the potential to cause pandemics; pathogens important to particular regions; endemic diseases; and bioterrorism, dual-use research of concern, and concerns over gain-of-function research, where modifying pathogens in the laboratory might potentially be misused.

The book contains personal experiences, including Osterholm's La Crosse encephalitis, and it uses medical history to assess the threat of pandemics and anti-microbial resistance, while also discussing political responses. The authors propose a nine-point "Battle Plan for Survival" to fight emerging threats, with the aim of informing and inspiring people into public health work.

== Reception ==
The book was described by Richard Preston as a "powerful and necessary book" that "offers us not just fear but plans". John M. Barry described the book as Osterholm's way of getting results.

Frank Weimann described the book's "dismal introduction on the threat of epidemics" and the main content as "a disturbing description of what humans are doing to keep" epidemiologists in business. Weimann is convinced by Osterholm's call for planning, research, and funding.

Excerpts from the book appeared in Wired and on MPR News. It was listed in the Johns Hopkins Bloomberg School of Public Health's best books of 2017.
