= Council of State and Territorial Epidemiologists =

The Council of State and Territorial Epidemiologists (CSTE) is a 501(c)(6) non-profit organization originally organized in 1955, founded in 1992, and based in Atlanta, Georgia. CSTE works to advance public health policy and workforce capacity for applied public health epidemiologists in all localities, states, and territories in the United States.

CSTE also provides information, education, and developmental support of practicing epidemiologists in a wide range of areas as well as expertise for program and surveillance efforts. CSTE works with the Centers for Disease Control and Prevention, the U.S. Congress, the U.S. Department Health and Human Services, Substance Abuse and Mental Health Services Administration (SAMHSA), and other partners. CSTE is led by an executive board composed of members who lead activities in various subject-specific steering committees.

== Vision and mission ==
The Council of State and Territorial Epidemiologists (CSTE) is committed to improving the public's health by supporting the efforts of epidemiologists working at the state and local level to influence public health programs and policy based on science and data.

CSTE promotes the effective use of epidemiologic data to guide public health practice and improve health. CSTE accomplishes this by supporting the use of effective public health surveillance and good epidemiologic practice through training, capacity development, and peer consultation, developing standards for practice, and advocating for resources and scientifically based policy.

CSTE has worked with the Centers for Disease Control and Prevention (CDC) on Case Definitions for Public Health Surveillance and Chronic Disease Indicators.

== Activities ==
CSTE is known for the following activities:

- The CSTE Annual Conference. – the largest annual gathering of applied epidemiologists in the nation, including 1,400 attendees in 2015.
- The CDC/CSTE Applied Epidemiology Fellowship – designed for recent master’s or doctoral level graduates in epidemiology or a related field who are interested in public health practice at the state or local level.
- Strengthening Health Systems through Interprofessional Education (SHINE) Fellowships – including three fellowships for bachelor's, master's, and doctoral graduates: Applied Public Health Informatics Fellowship (APHIF), Health Systems Integration Program (HSIP), Informatics-Training in Place (I-TIPP).
- Steering committees and subcommittees – facilitating a wide array of member-driven public health epidemiology activities and information sharing through 30 subject-specific committees. Activities include the development of resources, manuals, and best practices; the facilitation of workshops, training events, and webinars; multi-partner collaborative projects; and more.
- Federal advocacy – communicating the workforce capacity needs of state, local, and territorial health departments.
- CSTE position statements – effecting national epidemiologic policy and procedural change through a process of review and voting by state representatives.
- Epidemiology Capacity Assessment – surveying all state, local, and tribal epidemiologists every two years to assess capacity in nine program areas: bioterrorism/preparedness, infectious diseases, chronic diseases, maternal and child health, environmental health, occupational health, oral health, substance abuse, and injury.
- State Reportable Conditions Assessment – surveying all 50 states, the District of Columbia, and six territories annually to provide an up-to-date description of reporting requirements for infectious diseases and non-infectious conditions.
- Indicators development – developing, maintaining, and stewarding surveillance indicators for environmental health, occupational health, chronic diseases, injury epidemiology, and other public health areas in order to improve performance of related public health programs.
- Global technical assistance – facilitating consultations and rapid deployment of members for international activities, such as Ebola Virus Disease and influenza epidemiology.

== See also ==
- List of notifiable diseases
