= Lawrence Bittaker and Roy Norris =

American serial killers and rapists known as the Tool Box Killers

Lawrence Bittaker
- Bittaker on trial in 1981.
- Born: Lawrence Sigmund Bittaker; September 27, 1940; Pittsburgh, Pennsylvania, U.S.
- Died: December 13, 2019 (aged 79); San Quentin State Prison, San Quentin, California, U.S.
- Status: Died in prison while awaiting execution
- Convictions: First-degree murder (5 counts), kidnapping (5 counts), rape (9 counts)
- Penalty: Death (1981)

Details
- Victims: 5+
- Span of crimes: June 24 – October 31, 1979
- State: California
- Locations: San Gabriel Mountains, Sunland-Tujunga
- Date apprehended: November 20, 1979

Roy Norris
- Norris shortly before his arrest in 1979.
- Born: Roy Lewis Norris; February 5, 1948; Greeley, Colorado, U.S.
- Died: February 24, 2020 (aged 72); California Medical Facility, Vacaville, California, U.S.
- Status: Died in prison
- Convictions: First-degree murder (4 counts), second-degree murder (1 count), kidnapping, rape, robbery
- Penalty: Life imprisonment with the possibility of parole after 30 years (never granted)

Details
- Victims: 5+
- Span of crimes: June 24 – October 31, 1979
- State: California
- Locations: San Gabriel Mountains, Sunland-Tujunga
- Date apprehended: November 20, 1979
- Imprisoned at: Richard J. Donovan Correctional Facility

Lawrence Sigmund Bittaker (September 27, 1940 – December 13, 2019) and Roy Lewis Norris (February 5, 1948 – February 24, 2020), also known as the Tool Box Killers, were two American serial killers and rapists who committed the kidnapping, rape, torture and murder of five teenage girls in Southern California over a five-month period in 1979.

Described by FBI special agent John Edward Douglas as the most disturbing individual for whom he has ever created a criminal profile, Bittaker was sentenced to death for five murders on March 24, 1981, but died of natural causes while incarcerated on death row at San Quentin State Prison in December 2019.

Norris accepted a plea bargain whereby he agreed to testify against Bittaker and was sentenced to life imprisonment on May 7, 1980, with possibility of parole after serving thirty years. He died of natural causes at California Medical Facility in February 2020.

Bittaker and Norris became known as the "Tool Box Killers" because the majority of instruments used to torture and murder their victims, such as pliers, ice picks and sledgehammers, were items normally stored inside a household toolbox.

== Early life ==
=== Lawrence Bittaker ===
Lawrence Sigmund Bittaker was born in Pittsburgh, Pennsylvania, on September 27, 1940, as the unwanted child of a couple who had chosen not to have children. He was placed in an orphanage by his birth mother and was adopted as an infant. Bittaker's adoptive father worked in the aviation industry, which required the family to frequently move around the United States throughout his childhood.

Bittaker was first arrested for shoplifting at the age of 12 and obtained a minor criminal record over the next four years after further arrests for the same offense—in addition to petty theft—which brought him to the attention of juvenile authorities. Bittaker would later claim these numerous theft-related offenses committed throughout his adolescence had been attempts to compensate for his parents' lack of love and consideration for him.

Although reported to have an IQ of 138, Bittaker considered school to be a tedious experience and dropped out of high school in 1957. By this stage in his adolescence, he and his adoptive parents were living in California. Within a year of dropping out, he had been arrested for car theft, a hit and run, and evading arrest. For these offenses he was imprisoned at the California Youth Authority, where he remained until he was 18 years old. Upon release, Bittaker discovered that his adoptive parents had disowned him and moved to another state. He would never see his adoptive parents again.

=== Roy Norris ===
Roy Lewis Norris was born in Greeley, Colorado, on February 5, 1948, the first of two children to Glen and Norma Norris. Norris was conceived out of wedlock; his parents had married to avoid the social stigma surrounding illegitimate birth at the time. Norris's extended family lived within a short distance of his parents' home due to his grandfather's real estate investments. His father worked in a scrapyard and his mother was a drug-addicted housewife. He occasionally lived with his parents throughout his childhood and adolescence but was repeatedly placed in the care of foster families throughout the state of Colorado.

Norris's childhood recollections were interspersed with memories of wrongful accusations while living with his biological parents, and of being neglected by many of the foster families he lived with, frequently being denied sufficient food or clothing. He also claimed to have been sexually abused when in the care of a Hispanic family, later stating the prejudice he held toward Hispanic people originated from the neglect and abuse he endured as a child when placed in the care of this family.

While living with his birth parents at the age of 16, Norris visited the home of a female relative who was in her early twenties and began speaking to her in a sexually suggestive manner. She ordered him to leave her house and informed Norris's father, who threatened to subject him to a beating. Norris subsequently stole his father's car and drove into the Rocky Mountains, where he attempted to commit suicide by injecting pure air into an artery in his arm. He was later apprehended as a runaway, and returned to live with his parents. Upon his return home, Norris's parents informed him that he and his younger sister were unwanted children and that they intended to divorce when both reached adolescence.

A year later, Norris dropped out of school and joined the United States Navy. He was stationed in San Diego in 1965 and was deployed to serve in the Vietnam War in 1969, although he did not see active combat during his four-month tour of duty. He was honorably discharged from the Navy after one tour of duty.

== First offenses ==
=== Bittaker ===
Within days of his parole from the California Youth Authority, Bittaker was arrested for transporting a stolen vehicle across state lines. In August 1959, Bittaker was sentenced to eighteen months' imprisonment, to be served in the Oklahoma State Reformatory. He was later transferred to the medical center for federal prisoners in Springfield, Missouri, to serve the remainder of his sentence.

In 1960, Bittaker was released from prison and soon reverted to crime. Within months of his release, he had been arrested in Los Angeles for robbery and, in May 1961, was sentenced to fifteen years' imprisonment. While incarcerated, he was characterized by a psychiatrist as being highly manipulative. The psychiatrist also described Bittaker as "having considerable concealed hostility."

Bittaker was released on parole in 1963 after completing two years of his sentence. In October 1964, he was again imprisoned for parole violation. In 1966, Bittaker underwent further examinations by two independent psychiatrists, both of whom classified him as a borderline psychopath: a highly manipulative individual unable to acknowledge the consequences of his actions. Bittaker explained to one of them that his criminal activities gave him a feeling of self-importance, although he insisted circumstantial matters pertaining to his environment and upbringing decreased his ability to resist committing crimes. Bittaker was prescribed anti-psychotic medication. A year later, he was again released into society.

A month after his parole in July 1967, Bittaker was again arrested and convicted of theft and of leaving the scene of an accident. He was sentenced to five years but was released in April 1970. In March 1971, Bittaker was again arrested for burglary. Due to repeated parole violations, he was sentenced to serve between six months and fifteen years' imprisonment in October 1971. Three years later, Bittaker was again released from prison.

In 1974, Bittaker was arrested for assault with attempt to commit murder, after he stabbed a young supermarket employee who had accused him of stealing. The supermarket employee had observed Bittaker stealing a steak and had followed Bittaker outside and into the store's parking lot, where he asked Bittaker whether he had forgotten to pay. Bittaker responded by stabbing his pursuer in the chest, narrowly missing his heart. He attempted to flee but was quickly restrained by two other supermarket employees. The employee, Gary Louie, survived the stabbing, and Bittaker was convicted of the lesser charge of assault with a deadly weapon and sent to California Men's Colony in San Luis Obispo.

=== Norris ===
In November 1969, Norris was arrested for his first known sexual offenses: he was charged with both rape and assault with intent to commit rape. In the latter incident, he had attempted to force his way into the car of a lone woman. Three months later, in February 1970, Norris attempted to deceive a lone woman into allowing him to enter her home. When the woman refused, he attempted to break into her house; the woman phoned the police, who arrested Norris before he had the opportunity to cause the woman any harm.

Less than three months after this offense, Norris was diagnosed by military psychologists with schizoid personality disorder. He was given an administrative discharge from the Navy under terms labeled as psychological problems.

In May 1970, Norris—on bail for his latest offense—attacked a female student whom he had been stalking on the grounds of the San Diego State University campus. Norris repeatedly struck her on the back of the head with a rock until she slumped to her knees before he repeatedly beat her head against the sidewalk as he knelt upon her lower back. Shortly thereafter, Norris was charged with assault with a deadly weapon; he was committed to five years' imprisonment at Atascadero State Hospital, where he was classified as a mentally disordered sex offender.

Norris was released from the Atascadero State Hospital in 1975, with five years' probation, having been declared by doctors as an individual who was of "no further danger to others". Just three months after his release, Norris approached a 27-year-old woman walking home from a restaurant in Redondo Beach and offered her a ride on his motorcycle. When she declined, Norris parked his motorcycle and grabbed the woman's scarf, twisting it around her neck, before informing her he intended to rape her and dragging her into nearby bushes. Fearing for her life, the woman did not resist the rape.

Although the rape was reported to police, they were initially unable to find the perpetrator. However, one month later, the victim observed Norris's motorcycle and noted the license number, which she immediately gave to police. Norris was arrested for the rape; one year later, he was tried and convicted for this offense and sent to California Men's Colony in San Luis Obispo. While incarcerated there, he met and befriended Bittaker.

== Acquaintance ==
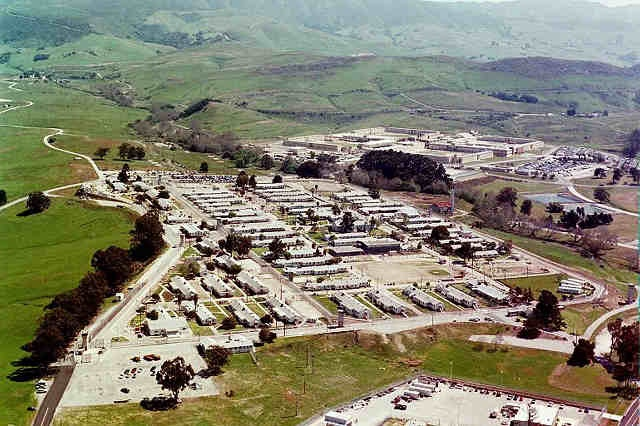
California Men's Colony, where Bittaker and Norris first became acquainted, discovering a common interest in sexual violence

Bittaker and Norris initially met in 1977, one year after Norris arrived at San Luis Obispo. Bittaker's initial impression of Norris upon his arrival at California Men's Colony was that he was a savvy individual who largely associated with hardened criminals from motorcycle gangs, in addition to dealing in contraband drugs. The pair gradually became more closely acquainted and began talking in friendly terms when Norris taught Bittaker how to construct jewelry.

According to Norris, Bittaker saved him from being attacked by fellow inmates on at least two occasions. By 1978, the pair had become close, sharing similar misogynistic views and fantasies of sexual violence, with Norris also divulging to Bittaker the biggest stimulation for him was of seeing frightened young women, adding this was the primary reason he had amassed a lengthy record for sexual offenses. Bittaker—who is not known to have committed any sexual offenses prior to his meeting Norris—himself divulged to Norris that if he ever raped a woman, he would kill her so as not to leave a witness to the crime.

When alone, the pair regularly discussed plans to assault and murder teenage girls after they were released. This shared fantasy evolved into an elaborate plan to murder one girl of each teenage year from 13 through 19. The pair vowed to become reacquainted once they were released.

=== Release ===
Bittaker was released from California Men's Colony on October 15, 1978; he returned to Los Angeles and found work as a skilled machinist. This work earned Bittaker close to $1,000 a week (the equivalent of about $4,970 as of 2026), and despite classifying himself as a loner, he became friendly with several people in his neighborhood, earning a reputation as a generous and helpful individual who occasionally donated money to the Salvation Army. On one occasion, he is known to have purchased large quantities of fast food and wine which he then handed to homeless individuals in downtown Los Angeles.

Bittaker was particularly popular among the local teenagers, and later admitted the primary reason he always had beer and marijuana in his Burbank motel was that his residence would remain a popular place for teenagers to socialize.

On January 15, 1979, three months after Bittaker was released from California Men's Colony, Norris was also released from prison and moved into his mother's home in Redondo Beach. Within one month of his release, he had raped a young woman whom he then simply abandoned in a desert. He soon found employment as an electrician in Compton. Shortly thereafter, he received a letter from Bittaker. In late-February, the pair met at a hotel and revisited their plan to kidnap and rape girls.

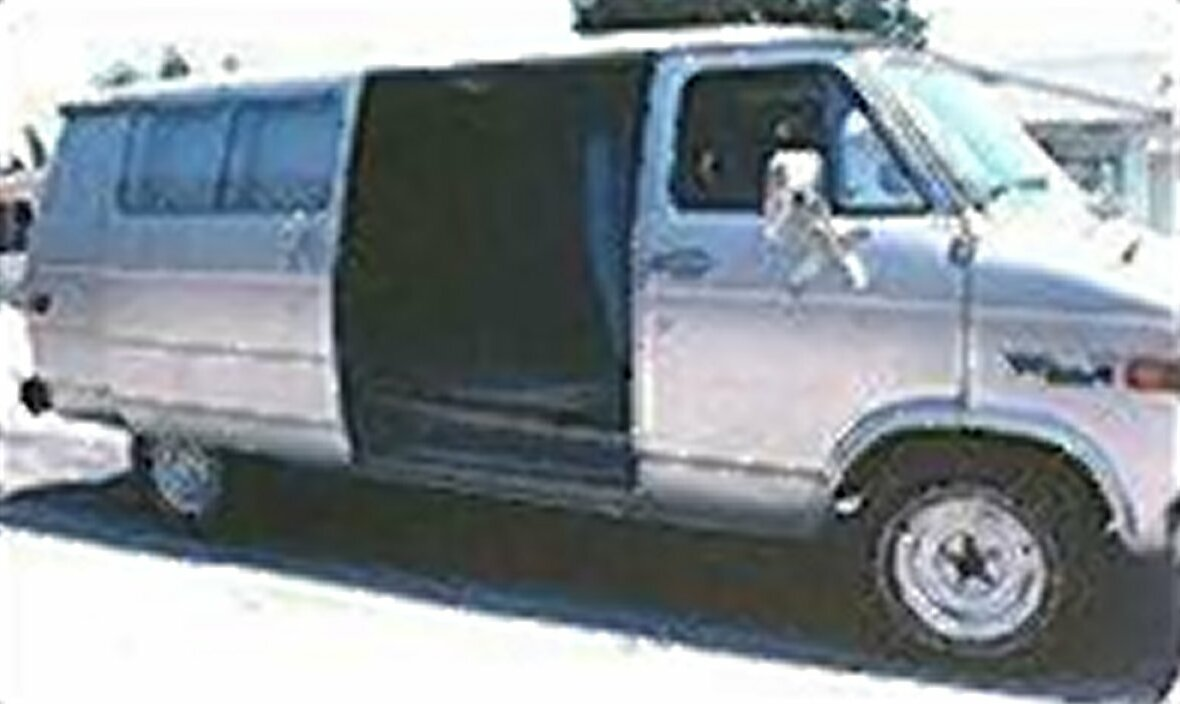
The GMC Vandura van Bittaker and Norris purchased to use when committing their abductions

In order for the pair to abduct teenage girls, Bittaker decided that, instead of a car, they would need a van. With financial assistance from Norris, Bittaker purchased a silver-gray 1977 GMC Vandura in February 1979. The vehicle was windowless on one side and had a large passenger-side sliding door. According to Bittaker, when viewing this sliding door, he realized he or Norris could "pull up [to a teenage girl] real close and not have to open the doors all the way." The pair would nickname this van "Murder Mac".

Over the following weeks, the two performed several modifications to the vehicle. These modifications included installing interior paneling to muffle sounds emanating from the van, adjusting the lock to the rear doors of the vehicle so the doors could only be opened from the outside, and purchasing radio scanning equipment to monitor police radio activity.

== Murders ==
From February to June 1979, Bittaker and Norris picked up more than twenty female hitchhikers. The pair did not assault these girls in any manner: these practice runs were merely a way for them to develop ruses to lure girls into the van voluntarily and of discovering secluded locations. In late-April, the pair found an isolated fire road in the San Gabriel Mountains. Bittaker broke open the locked gate with a crowbar and replaced the lock with one he owned.

=== Lucinda Lynn Schaefer ===
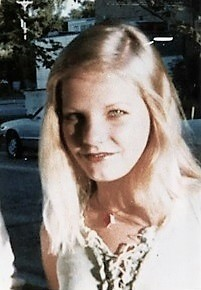
Lucinda Lynn Schaefer

Bittaker and Norris killed their first victim, 16-year-old Lucinda Lynn Schaefer, on June 24, 1979. Schaefer was last seen leaving a fellowship meeting at St. Andrew's Presbyterian Church in Redondo Beach. In his written accounts of the events of this day, Bittaker stated he and Norris first finished constructing the bed the pair had installed in the rear of the van, beneath which they placed tools, clothes, and a cooler filled with beer and soft drinks. At approximately 11 a.m., the pair drove to "the beach area, drinking beer, smoking grass, and flirting with girls. We had no set routine."

At approximately 7:46 p.m., Norris spotted Schaefer walking down a side street toward her grandmother's home and remarked to Bittaker, "There's a cute little blonde."

According to Bittaker, he and Norris stopped the van alongside Schaefer as she stooped to play with a cat. After unsuccessfully attempting to entice Schaefer into their van with alternative offers of marijuana, a lift home and claims to be concerned for her safety, Bittaker and Norris drove further ahead and parked alongside a driveway. Norris then exited the vehicle, opened the passenger-side sliding door, and leaned into the van, with his head and shoulders obscured from view behind the door. When Schaefer passed the van, Norris exchanged a few words with her before dragging her into the van and closing the door. Using a ruse they would repeat in most of their subsequent murders, Bittaker turned the radio to full volume as Norris bound the victim's arms and legs and gagged her with duct tape as Bittaker drove Schaefer to the fire road in the San Gabriel Mountains where, in April, the pair had previously switched the locks.

Despite initially screaming when she was abducted, Schaefer quickly regained her composure and began conversing with Norris as Bittaker continued driving. In his written account of the hours that followed, Bittaker wrote that Schaefer "displayed a magnificent state of self-control and composed acceptance of the conditions of which she had no control. She shed no tears, offered no resistance, and expressed no great concern for her safety ... I guess she knew what was coming."

At the fire road, Bittaker parked the van beside an embankment close to a fire hydrant. Norris first raped Schaefer after instructing Bittaker to "go take a walk" and return in one hour. Upon returning to the van, Bittaker similarly raped the girl in Norris's absence. Upon the second occasion in which she was raped by Norris in Bittaker's absence, Schaefer asked him whether they intended to kill her, to which Norris replied, "No." In response, Schaefer requested to be allowed time to pray before she was killed if that was Bittaker and Norris's intention.

In their subsequent accounts of the actual murder, Bittaker and Norris gave differing accounts as to who argued over whether they should kill her rather than release her: each stated the other argued that they should kill her. In any event, Schaefer pleaded for "only a second, to pray," before Norris attempted to manually strangle her. After approximately forty-five seconds, he became disturbed at "the look in her eyes" and ran to the front of the van, vomiting. Bittaker then manually strangled Schaefer until she collapsed to the ground, where her "back arched" before she began convulsing. He then twisted a wire coat hanger around her neck with Vise-Grip pliers until Schaefer's convulsions ceased. Schaefer was denied her requests to pray before Bittaker and Norris killed her.

Schaefer's body was wrapped in a plastic shower curtain and thrown over a steep canyon Bittaker had selected. According to Norris, after he and Bittaker had thrown Schaefer over the canyon, Bittaker assured him "the animals would eat her up, so there wouldn't be any evidence left."

=== Andrea Joy Hall ===
On July 8, 1979, two weeks after the murder of Schaefer, Bittaker and Norris encountered 18-year-old Andrea Joy Hall hitchhiking close to a fast-food restaurant along the Pacific Coast Highway. As the pair slowed the van to offer Hall a lift, another vehicle pulled over and offered Hall exactly that, which she accepted. Bittaker and Norris followed the vehicle from a distance until Hall exited the vehicle in Redondo Beach.

On this occasion, Norris hid in the back of the van in order to dupe Hall into believing Bittaker was traveling alone. Inside the van, Bittaker offered Hall a cold drink from the cooler in the rear of the van. Norris—who had hidden behind a bedspread in the rear of the van—pounced on Hall when she attempted to retrieve the drink and, after a strenuous fight, managed to subdue her by twisting her arm behind her back, causing her to scream in pain. Norris then gagged Hall with adhesive tape and bound her wrists and ankles.

Bittaker and Norris drove Hall to a location in the San Gabriel Mountains beyond where they had earlier taken Schaefer. At this location, she was raped twice by Bittaker and once by Norris. While Bittaker was raping Hall for the second time, Norris saw what he believed to be vehicle headlights approaching. Bittaker clasped his hand over Hall's mouth and dragged her into nearby bushes as Norris drove in an unsuccessful search for the vehicle he thought he had seen. When he returned, the pair drove to a location farther in the San Gabriel Mountains. Bittaker forced Hall to walk uphill naked alongside the road and to then perform oral sex on him, before ordering her to pose for several Polaroid pictures.

Bittaker and Norris drove Hall to a third location, where Bittaker again walked Hall up a nearby hill, this time as Norris drove to a nearby store to purchase alcohol. When Norris returned, Bittaker was alone and in possession of two further Polaroid pictures he had taken, both of which depicted Hall's face in expressions Norris later described as being of "sheer terror" as she begged for her life to be spared. Bittaker informed Norris that he had told Hall he was going to kill her and challenged her to give him as many reasons as she could come up with as to why she should be allowed to live, before thrusting an ice pick through her ear canal into her brain. He then turned her body over and thrust the ice pick into her other ear, stomping on it until the handle broke. Bittaker then strangled Hall before throwing her body off a cliff.

=== Jackie Doris Gilliam and Jacqueline Leah Lamp ===
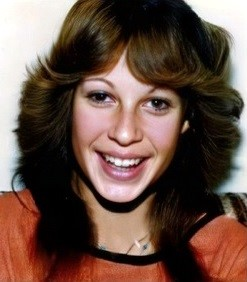
Jackie Doris Gilliam

On September 3, Bittaker and Norris observed two girls named Jackie Doris Gilliam and Jacqueline Leah Lamp sitting on a bus stop bench at the corner of Pier Avenue and Pacific Coast Highway. Lamp and Gilliam had been hitchhiking toward Hermosa Beach when Bittaker and Norris observed them as they were resting at the bus stop. Bittaker and Norris offered the girls a ride, which Gilliam and Lamp accepted. Inside the van, both girls were offered marijuana by Norris, which they accepted.

Shortly after entering the van, both girls realized that Bittaker had steered the van off the Pacific Coast Highway and was driving in the direction of the San Gabriel Mountains. When the girls protested, both Bittaker and Norris attempted to allay the girls' concerns with excuses, which did not deceive either girl. Lamp, aged 13, attempted to open the sliding door, whereupon Norris hit her on the back of the head with a home-made leather sap with lead weights, briefly knocking her unconscious, before overpowering 15-year-old Gilliam. As he began to bind and gag Gilliam, Lamp regained consciousness and again attempted to flee the van, whereupon Norris twisted her arm behind her back and dragged her back into the van. As this struggle ensued, Bittaker—noting the girls' struggle was in full view of potential witnesses at a nearby tennis court—stopped the van, punched Gilliam in the face, and assisted Norris in finishing binding and gagging the two girls.

Gilliam and Lamp were driven to the San Gabriel Mountains, where they were held captive for almost two days, being bound and gagged between repeated instances of sexual and physical abuse. Both men slept in the van alongside their two hostages, with each alternately acting as a lookout. On one occasion, Bittaker walked Lamp onto a nearby hill and forced her to pose for pornographic pictures before returning her to the van. Bittaker also asked Norris to take several Polaroid pictures of himself and Gilliam, both nude and clothed. In the first of three instances in which Bittaker raped Gilliam, he also created a tape recording of himself raping her and informing Gilliam to feel free to express her pain. Norris also admitted to raping Gilliam and forcing the girl to pretend she was his cousin to fulfill a harbored sexual fantasy. (Note: Bittaker later claimed to have buried this tape recording in a cemetery. The tape recording of Gilliam's rape was never found.) Bittaker is also known to have tortured Gilliam by stabbing her breasts with an ice pick and using vise grip pliers to tear off part of one nipple.

After almost two days of captivity, Lamp and Gilliam were murdered. At Bittaker's subsequent trial, Norris claimed he had suggested that Gilliam be killed quickly as, unlike Lamp, she had been largely cooperative throughout the period of her captivity, whereupon Bittaker replied, "No, they only die once anyway." Gilliam was struck in each ear with an ice pick, and then strangled to death.

After Bittaker had murdered Gilliam, he then forced Lamp out of the van. Upon exiting the sliding door, Bittaker shouted to her: "You wanted to stay a virgin; now you can die a virgin!" before Norris struck her upon the head with a sledgehammer. Bittaker then strangled Lamp until he believed she had died; when Lamp opened her eyes, Norris again bludgeoned her repeatedly as Bittaker strangled her to death. The bodies of Gilliam and Lamp were thrown over an embankment into the chaparral.

=== Shirley Lynette Ledford ===
Bittaker and Norris abducted their final victim, 16-year-old Shirley Lynette Ledford, on October 31, 1979. Ledford was abducted as she stood outside a gas station, hitchhiking home from a Halloween party in the suburban Sunland-Tujunga neighborhood of Los Angeles. Investigators believe Ledford accepted a ride home from Bittaker and Norris because she recognized Bittaker, as he is known to have frequented the McDonald's restaurant in which Ledford held a part-time job as a waitress.

Upon accepting the offer of a lift home and entering the van, Ledford was offered marijuana by Norris, which she refused. Bittaker drove the van to a secluded street, where Norris drew a knife, then bound and gagged Ledford with construction tape.

Bittaker then traded places with Norris, who drove in an aimless manner for in excess of an hour as Bittaker remained with Ledford in the back of the van. After removing the construction tape from the girl's mouth and legs, Bittaker tormented Ledford: initially slapping and mocking her, then beating her with his fists as he repeatedly shouted for her to "say something", then, as Ledford began screaming, shouting for her to "scream louder". As Ledford continued screaming, Bittaker began asking her as he struck her: "What's the matter? Don't you like to scream?"

As Ledford began to cry, she pleaded with Bittaker, repeatedly saying, "No, don't touch me." In response, Bittaker again ordered her to scream as loud as she wished, then began alternately striking her with a hammer, beating her breasts with his fists and torturing her with pliers both between and throughout instances when he raped and sodomized her. Repeatedly, Ledford can be heard pleading for the abuse to cease and making statements such as, "Oh no! No!" as sounds of Bittaker alternately extracting either the sledgehammer or the pliers from the toolbox can be heard on a tape recording he made after entering the rear of the van. Norris later described hearing "screams ... constant screams" emanating from the rear of the van as he drove.

Shortly after Norris switched places with Bittaker, he himself switched on the tape recorder that Bittaker had used to record much of the time he had been in the rear of the van with Ledford. Norris first shouted for Ledford to: "Go ahead and scream or I'll make you scream." In response, Ledford pleaded, "I'll scream if you stop hitting me," then emitted several high-pitched screams as Norris encouraged her to continue until he ordered her to stop.

Norris then reached for the sledgehammer as Ledford—seeing him do this—screamed, "Oh no!" Norris then struck Ledford once upon the left elbow. In response, she informed Norris he had broken her elbow, before pleading, "Don't hit me again." In response, Norris again raised the sledgehammer as Ledford repeatedly screamed, "No!" Norris then proceeded to strike Ledford twenty-five consecutive times upon the same elbow with the sledgehammer, before asking her, "What are you sniveling about?" as Ledford continuously screamed and wept.

We've all heard women scream in horror films ... still, we know that no-one is really screaming. Why? Simply because an actress can't produce some sounds that convince us that something vile and heinous is happening. If you ever heard that tape, there is just no possible way that you'd not begin crying and trembling. I doubt you could listen to more than a full sixty seconds of it.

— Roy Norris, describing his recollections of the audio tape the pair had created of Shirley Ledford's rape and torture. April 1997.

After approximately two hours of captivity, Norris killed Ledford by strangling her with a wire coat hanger, which he tightened with pliers. Ledford did not react much to the act of strangulation, although she died with her eyes open. Bittaker then opted to discard her body on a random lawn in order to view the reaction from the press. The pair drove to a randomly selected house in Sunland where Norris discarded Ledford's body in a bed of ivy upon the front lawn.

Ledford's body was found by a jogger the following morning. An autopsy revealed that, in addition to having been sexually violated, she had died of strangulation after receiving extensive blunt-force trauma to the face, head, breasts, and left elbow, with her olecranon sustaining multiple fractures. Her genitalia and rectum had been torn, caused in part by Bittaker having inserted pliers inside her body. In addition, her left hand bore a puncture wound and the index finger on her right hand had been slashed.

Bittaker would later claim the tape recording the pair had created of Ledford's clear abuse and torture offered nothing other than the evidence of a threesome, adding that, toward the very end, Ledford was screaming for him and Norris to kill her.

== Investigation ==
In November 1979, Norris became reacquainted with a friend named Joseph Jackson, an individual with whom he had previously been incarcerated at California Men's Colony. Norris confided in Jackson regarding his and Bittaker's exploits over the previous five months, including graphic details of the murder of Shirley Ledford (the only victim whose body had been found at this time). Norris also divulged to Jackson that, in addition to the five murders he and Bittaker had committed, there had been three additional incidents in which he and Bittaker had abducted or attempted to abduct young women who had either escaped their attackers or, in one instance, had actually been raped, but released.

Upon hearing Norris's confessions, Jackson consulted his attorney, who advised him to inform authorities. Jackson agreed, and he and his attorney informed the Los Angeles Police Department, who in turn relayed the two men to the Hermosa Beach police.

A Hermosa Beach detective named Paul Bynum was assigned to investigate Jackson's claims as to Norris's confessions of the murders, attempted abductions, and rapes that he had confided to Jackson had occurred between June and October. Bynum initially noted that Jackson's statements as to Norris's confessions did match reports on file of several teenage girls who had been reported missing over the previous five months. In addition, the incident Norris had confided to Jackson where he claimed he and Bittaker had sprayed mace in the face of a woman, who had then been dragged into Bittaker's GMC van and raped by both men, matched a report filed in relation to an incident that occurred on September 30. In this filed report, a young woman named Robin Robeck had been sprayed in the face with mace before being dragged into a van and raped by two Caucasian men in their mid-30s, before being released. Although Robeck had reported the abduction and rape to police, they had been unable to identify her assailants.

Bynum dispatched an investigator to visit Robeck at her residence in Oregon, to show her a series of mug shots. Without hesitation, Robeck positively identified two photos presented to her as those of the men who had kidnapped and raped her on September 30. The two individuals she identified were Bittaker and Norris.

== Arrest ==
Upon linking Bittaker and Norris to the rape of Robin Robeck, the Hermosa Beach police placed Norris under surveillance; within days, they had observed his dealing in marijuana. On November 20, 1979, Norris was arrested by the Hermosa Beach police for parole violation. The same day, at the Burbank motel where he resided, Bittaker was arrested for the rape of Robin Robeck.

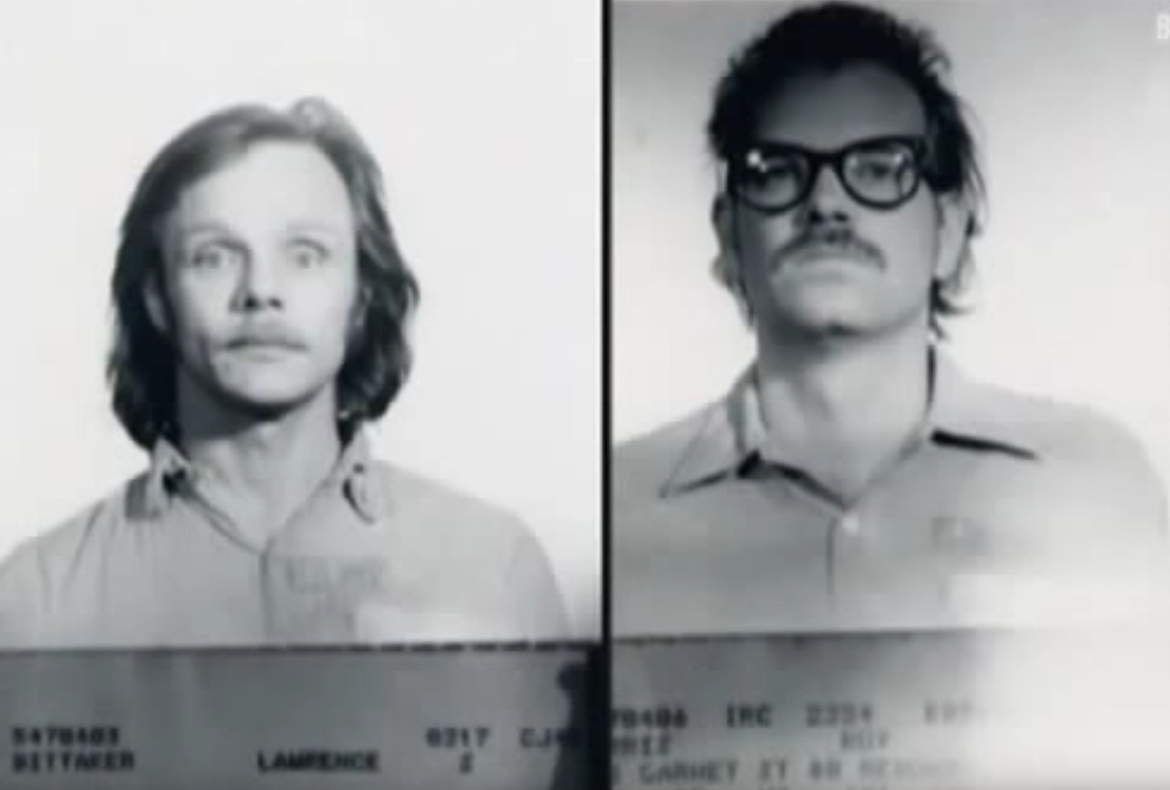
Mug shots of Bittaker (left) and Norris (right), taken shortly after their November 1979 arrest

Although Robeck had identified mug shots of Bittaker and Norris, she was unable to positively identify her assailants in a police lineup. Nonetheless, police had observed Norris dealing in marijuana, whereas Bittaker had been in possession of drugs at the time of his arrest. Both were held on charges of parole violation.

A search of Bittaker's apartment revealed several Polaroid photographs which were determined as depicting Hall and Gilliam—both of whom had been reported as missing earlier the same year. Inside Bittaker's van, investigators discovered a sledgehammer, a plastic bag filled with lead weights, a book detailing how to locate police radio frequencies, a jar of Vaseline, two necklaces (later confirmed as belonging to two of the victims), and a tape recording of a young woman in obvious distress, screaming and repeatedly pleading for mercy while being tortured and sexually abused.

The mother of Ledford—named by Jackson as being one of the girls whom Norris had confessed he and Bittaker had killed—identified the voice on the tape as being that of her only daughter; the voices of the two men mocking and threatening Ledford in the process of her torture and abuse were identified as being Roy Norris and Lawrence Bittaker. Also found in Bittaker's motel were seven bottles of various acidic materials. (Investigators would later discover Bittaker had planned to use these acidic materials upon their next victim.)

Inside Norris's apartment, police discovered a bracelet he had taken from Ledford's body as a souvenir. Also found at the homes of both Bittaker and Norris were Polaroid pictures of almost 500 teenage girls and young women, most of which had apparently been taken at Redondo Beach and Hermosa Beach, with others taken by Bittaker at a Burbank high school. Most of these pictures had been taken without the girls' knowledge or consent.

=== Confession ===
On November 30, 1979, Norris attended a preliminary hearing in relation to the September 30 rape. By this stage, Norris was beginning to display visible signs of stress. At the hearing, Norris waived his Miranda rights before Detective Bynum and Deputy District Attorney Stephen Kay began questioning him, initially in relation to the rape of Robin Robeck, then in relation to the statements given to police by Joseph Jackson and the evidence recovered from his and Bittaker's residences.

Initially, Norris denied any involvement in any murders, rapes or disappearances; however, when confronted with the evidence investigators had compiled, Norris began to confess, although he did attempt to portray Bittaker as being more culpable in the murders than himself. In what Bynum and Kay later described as a "casual, unconcerned manner," Norris divulged that he and Bittaker had been in the habit of driving around areas such as the Pacific Coast Highway and randomly approaching girls whom they found attractive with offers of a ride, posing with the pair for photographs, or marijuana. Most of those whom they approached rejected whatever given ruse Bittaker and Norris used to entice them into the van, although four girls had accepted lifts from the pair and had been murdered, with a fifth victim—their first—being grabbed by force.

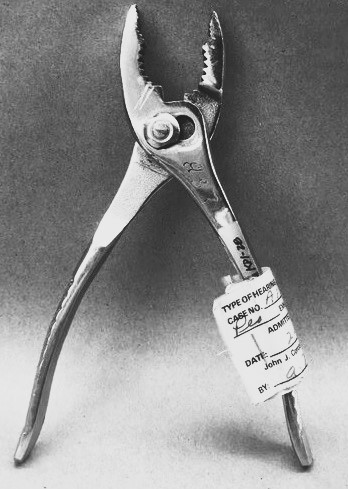
One of the pairs of pliers used by Bittaker and Norris in the commission of their murders

Inside the van, the girls would typically be overpowered, bound hand and foot, gagged, and driven to locations deep within the San Gabriel Mountains, where they would be sexually assaulted by both men, then usually killed by strangulation with a wire coat hanger, although two of the victims had had ice picks driven into their ears before being strangled. Norris admitted to bludgeoning their youngest victim, Lamp, about the head with a sledgehammer as Bittaker strangled her and admitted to repeatedly striking Shirley Ledford upon the elbow with a sledgehammer before strangling her to death. The bottles of acid found at Bittaker's motel, Norris stated, were intended for use upon the next victim they abducted, and the acts of torture and humiliation had been committed against their victims "for fun".

According to Norris, the level of brutality Bittaker had exhibited toward their victims had increased on each successive instance they had lured a girl into the van; their final victim, Lynette Ledford, had actually pleaded to be killed in order that her agony would end. Additional details by Norris provided further corroborating evidence to support his confessions. For example, he knew that their first victim, Schaefer, had left a meeting at a Presbyterian Church shortly before she was abducted and that Schaefer had lost one shoe as she had been dragged into Bittaker's van. Norris also knew part of Shirley Ledford's ancestry was Hispanic, and that Bittaker had unsuccessfully asked her to date him prior to October 1979.

In a press statement relating to the police investigation into the murders issued on February 7, 1980, Los Angeles County Sheriff Peter Pitchess stated the victims had been subjected to "sadistic and barbaric abuse", adding that five charges of first-degree murder would be sought against both Bittaker and Norris. Sheriff Pitchess also stated that, in relation to the Polaroid pictures found in Bittaker and Norris's apartments, police had located sixty of the young women depicted—none of whom had been harmed.

Nonetheless, Pitchess also stated that police had also identified nineteen of the women depicted in the pictures as being individuals who had been reported missing, and that these teenage girls and young women may well have been murdered, although Pitchess did stress that they had no conclusive evidence to suggest that these additional nineteen women photographed had fallen victim to Bittaker and Norris.

One of the Polaroid pictures seized from Bittaker and Norris depicts an unidentified young white woman, alone with Bittaker and Norris, in circumstances very similar to the pictures found depicting known victims Hall, Lamp, and Gilliam. The young woman in the pictures has never been identified. This photograph is indicative there may have been one further victim whom neither Bittaker or Norris ever mentioned to investigators.

=== Search of San Gabriel Mountains ===
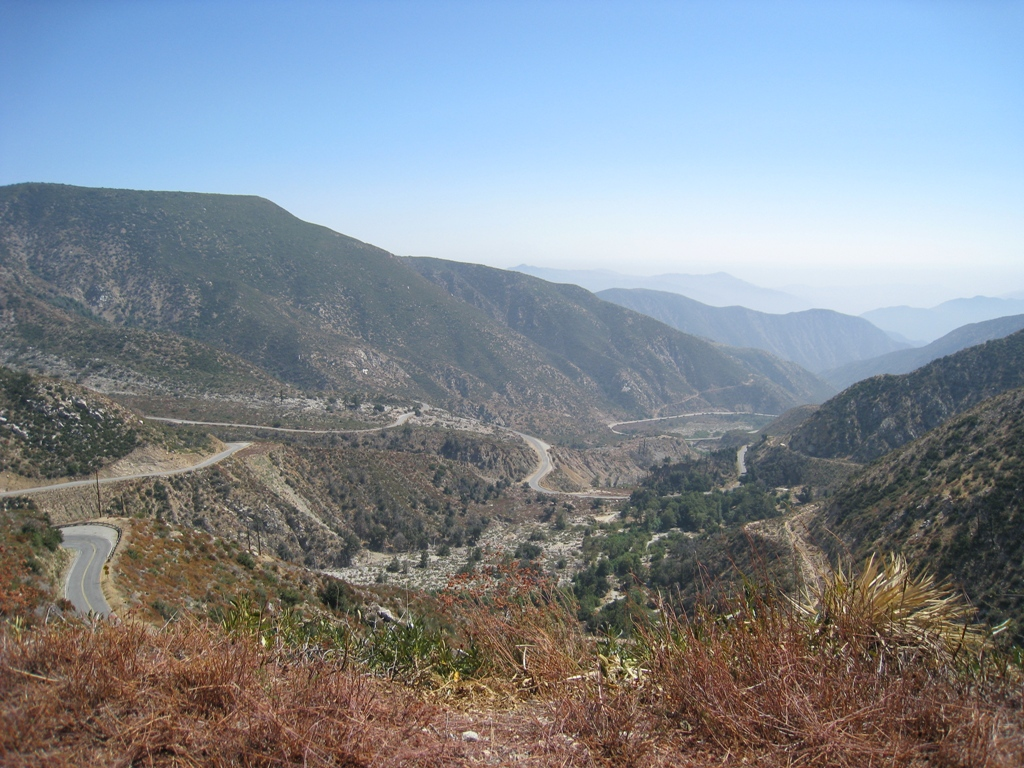
The San Gabriel Mountains. Bittaker and Norris murdered and discarded the bodies of four of their victims at this location. Norris led investigators to the bodies of two of the four victims he and Bittaker murdered at this location.

Norris agreed to return to the San Gabriel Mountains to search for the bodies of the girls to whose abduction and murder he had confessed to assisting in. In each instance, Norris brought detectives to the area where he and Bittaker had disposed of their victims' bodies. Despite extensive searches of the areas where he stated the bodies of Schaefer and Hall had been discarded, their bodies were never found. On February 9, 1980, the skeletonized bodies of Lamp and Gilliam were found at the bottom of a canyon, alongside a dry river bed. The bodies were scattered over an area measuring hundreds of feet in diameter. An ice pick was still lodged in the skull of Gilliam; the skull of Lamp bore multiple indentations—evidence of the numerous hammer blows Norris had stated he inflicted.

In February 1980, Norris and Bittaker were formally charged with the murders of the five girls. At the arraignment, Bittaker was denied bail, whereas Norris's bail was set at $10,000. Within one month of his being charged with murder, Norris had accepted a plea bargain in which he would testify against Bittaker in return for the prosecution agreeing not to seek the death penalty against him.

== Guilty plea ==
On March 18, 1980, Norris pleaded guilty to four counts of first-degree murder, one count of second-degree murder (in relation to victim Hall), two counts of rape, and one count of robbery. Formal sentencing was postponed until May 7.

In return for Norris's agreeing to plead guilty and to testify against Bittaker, prosecutors had agreed to seek neither the death penalty nor life without parole at the upcoming sentencing hearing.

Prior to his May 7 sentencing, Norris was reviewed by a probation officer who testified at his sentencing that Norris had again accused Bittaker of the actual torture of their victims, and that for Norris himself, the feeling of power and the dominance he had over the victims was the main overriding factor, as opposed to having sexual intercourse with them. The probation officer added that Norris "never exhibited any remorse or compassion about his brutal acts toward the victims ... the defendant appears compulsive in his need to inflict pain and torture upon women." In conclusion, the probation officer testified that Norris "can realistically be regarded as an extreme sociopath, whose depraved pattern of behavior is beyond rehabilitation."

On May 7, 1980, Norris was sentenced to forty-five years to life in prison, with eligibility for parole beginning in 2010.

=== Arraignment ===
On April 29, 1980, Bittaker was arraigned on twenty-nine charges of kidnapping, rape, sodomy, and murder in addition to various charges of criminal conspiracy and possession of a firearm. He was also charged with two counts of conspiracy to commit murder dating from December 1979 in which he had unsuccessfully attempted to persuade two inmates due to be released to murder Robin Robeck in order to prevent her from testifying against him at his upcoming trial. The charges for the rape of Robin Robeck would later be dropped because of a lack of physical evidence as well as Robeck's failing to identify her attackers in a lineup.

When asked by Judge William Hollingsworth as to how he pleaded, Bittaker remained silent—refusing to answer any questions. In response, the judge entered a plea of not guilty on his behalf.

== Trial ==
Bittaker's trial began on January 19, 1981. He was tried in Torrance, California, in the Los Angeles County Superior Court, before Judge Thomas Fredericks. The trial itself would prove to be the first felony case to be televised in the state of California.

The star witness to appear for the prosecution at the trial of Bittaker was Norris, who began his testimony on January 22 and whom prosecutor Stephen Kay informed the jury in his opening statement: "You're not going to like him, but he's going to tell you the truth. You have to remember that when a murder is committed in hell, you don't have angels for witnesses."

Norris testified as to how he became acquainted with Bittaker in jail, and how the pair had formulated a plan to kidnap, rape, and kill teenage girls. Responding to questions from the prosecutor, Norris stated that in June 1979, he had unsuccessfully attempted to abduct and rape a young woman, who escaped unharmed. When he informed Bittaker of this incident, they both agreed to act together on all future abductions. Norris then chronologically recounted for the court the details of each of the five murders he and Bittaker had committed in addition to the September 30, 1979 rape of Robeck; the attempted abduction of a woman named Jan Malin, which had also occurred on September 30; and the attempted abduction of an unidentified young woman on September 27.

In reference to the actual murders, Norris stated that after he unsuccessfully attempted to strangle Schaefer, Bittaker had strangled her to death with a wire coat hanger, adding that "her body convulsed for fifteen seconds or so and that was it—she died". The pair had then thrown her body into a location at or near the San Dimas Canyon. In reference to the murder of Hall, Norris stated he had been told by Bittaker to drive to a nearby store to purchase alcohol when Hall was murdered, after which he returned to find Bittaker, smiling and holding Polaroid pictures he had taken of Hall after informing her he intended to kill her.

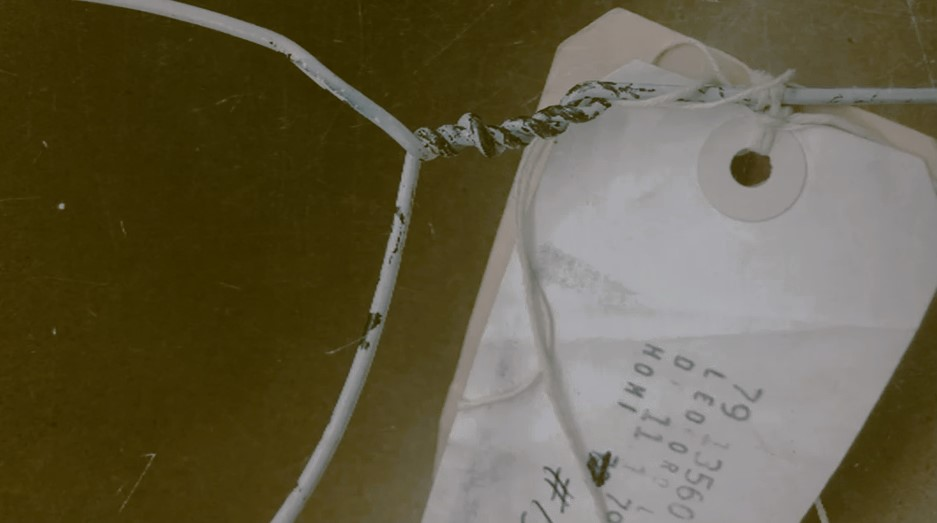
The apex of the wire coat hanger used by Norris to strangle Shirley Lynette Ledford, as introduced into evidence at Bittaker's trial

With reference to victims Lamp and Gilliam, Norris stated that the two girls were held captive for "over a day" before being murdered, adding that Bittaker had killed Gilliam before he himself bludgeoned Lamp about the head as Bittaker strangled her. When discussing the abuse and torture of Ledford, Norris stated he had, upon the insistence of Bittaker, committed the actual murder of Ledford, adding Bittaker had informed him that "I should kill her, because I hadn't killed anyone yet. I knew this was coming, so I agreed." Norris then confessed to having killed Ledford by strangling her with a coat hanger, which he had tightened with pliers in much the same manner Bittaker had with previous victims Schaefer and Lamp. Norris then stated the pair had driven to Sunland, where he discarded Shirley Ledford's body upon the front lawn as Bittaker waited in his van.

Several witnesses testified as to Bittaker having shown them pictures of the victims he had retained as keepsakes and which had been found in his motel. One witness, a 17-year-old neighbor of Bittaker's named Christina Dralle, testified that Bittaker had shown her a Polaroid picture he had taken of Gilliam before stating, "The girls I get won't talk anymore." Dralle also stated Bittaker had once played a cassette tape to her in which she heard two girls screaming and Bittaker laughing. Another witness to testify was Lloyd Douglas, who had shared a jail cell with Bittaker following his November 1979 arrest. Douglas testified that Bittaker had discussed in detail the torture he had inflicted on victims Gilliam and Ledford, stating Bittaker had informed him he had stabbed one of Gilliam's breasts with an ice pick, which he then twisted as the tool remained inserted in the wound; he had also "pinched" Gilliam on the legs and breasts with a vise grip, before tearing off part of one nipple. Douglas also stated Bittaker had informed him he had "pulled on" the genitals and breasts of Shirley Ledford with the same instrument, and that he had attempted to beat her breasts "back into her chest."

The defense contended that Norris was the actual perpetrator of the murders and that Bittaker had only become aware of Norris's activities shortly before his arrest when Norris had informed him he had murdered several girls whom they had both previously encountered and sexually assaulted. To support their case, the defense produced a friend of Norris named Richard Shoopman, who testified that Norris had repeatedly divulged to him his desire to rape young girls. Shoopman also testified that Norris had informed him that the look of shock and fear on the face of a young girl was a prime sexual stimulus for him. In support of Bittaker's case, the defense also referenced the Polaroid images taken of the facial expressions of Hall, and of Bittaker's statements regarding Norris's revelations to Bittaker regarding his prime sexual stimulations while both were incarcerated at California Men's Colony in 1977.

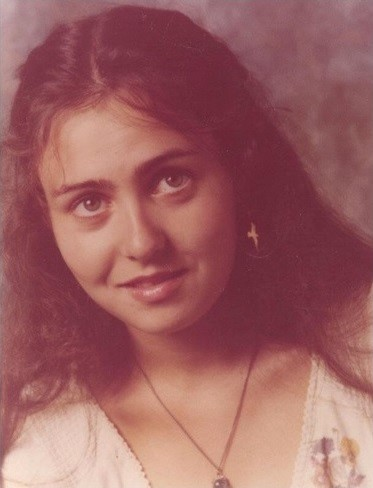
Shirley Lynette Ledford. The audio recording of her abuse at Bittaker's hands was the most damning evidence presented at his trial.

The most damning evidence presented at Bittaker's trial was a 17-minute section of the audio tape the pair had created of Ledford's abuse and torment. The audiotape, which had been found inside Bittaker's van and which Norris had earlier testified Bittaker had repeatedly played as he drove in the weeks prior to his arrest—adding that Bittaker considered the contents to be "real funny"—was presented in evidence on January 29, with Stephen Kay forewarning the jury a "voice from the dead" would "point an accusing finger" at Bittaker, stating: "For those of you who do not know what hell is like, you will find out." (Note: Judge Fredericks had earlier denied motions by the defense to omit the tape recording from admission as evidence.)

More than 100 people were present in the courtroom as the tape was played, and many members of both the jury and the audience wept openly upon hearing the contents, with several members of the audience either burying their heads in their hands, dabbing tears from their eyes or rushing out of the courtroom before the tape had finished. Bittaker was undisturbed at hearing the contents of the tape, and smiled throughout the duration of the recording.

In one of two instances throughout the trial when prosecutor Stephen Kay was reduced to tears, he walked out of the courtroom during recess following the hearing of the recording of Ledford's rape, abuse, and torture. Weeping openly, Kay stated to the reporters gathered outside the courtroom: "Everybody who has heard that tape has had it affect their lives. I just picture those girls ... how alone they were when they died." When questioned by reporters whether the audiotape should have been introduced into evidence, given the obvious psychological and emotional trauma caused to many in the courtroom through the contents being broadcast, Kay simply stated: "You're darn right it [the audio tape] should have been. The jury needs to know what these guys did."

=== Bittaker's testimony ===
On February 5, 1981, Bittaker testified on his own behalf. He denied any involvement in the abduction and murder of Schaefer and claimed that Norris had informed him that he and another man had committed the crime; he also claimed to have paid Hall to pose for the Polaroid photographs depicting her found at his Burbank motel after Hall had agreed to his offer of $200 for sex. He then claimed Norris had walked Hall into the San Gabriel Mountains, before returning alone and informing Bittaker he had told Hall to "find her own way home."

Bittaker had a similar explanation for the double murder of Lamp and Gilliam: he claimed Gilliam accepted an offer of money for sex and posing for pictures, and that he had last seen the girls alone with Norris in his GMC van. With regard to the murder of Ledford, he claimed she had agreed to theatrically scream for the tape recorder, and that she was not tortured in his presence, but had been left alone with Norris in his van.

=== Closing arguments ===
Bittaker's trial lasted for over three weeks. On February 9, 1981, the prosecution and defense counsels began their closing arguments. In the closing argument delivered by the prosecution, Kay apologized to the jury that he was only asking for the death penalty, adding that he wished the law permitted him to request that the same suffering be inflicted upon Bittaker that he had inflicted upon his victims. Kay then described Bittaker as an "excuse for a man" as he held aloft pictures of each of the five murdered girls before the jury.

Seeking the death penalty for Bittaker, Kay referred to the case as "one of the most shocking, brutal cases in the history of American crime" and added: "Make no mistake, ladies and gentlemen, a punishment of life imprisonment in prison would be a total, complete victory for him. If the death penalty is not appropriate in this case, [then] when will it ever be?" In his own closing argument before the jury, Deputy District Attorney Clifford Randolph Ramsey discredited Bittaker's claims that—contrary to Norris's testimony—Shirley Lynette Ledford had agreed to scream, weep, and plead for mercy theatrically for the tape recording introduced as evidence, stating to the jury: "You've heard the sounds on this tape ... Ms. Ledford screaming, yelling 'Don't touch me! No, no, no, no, no!' That tape should be sufficient corroboration by itself!"

Defense attorney Albert Garber requested the jury discount the testimony of Norris; arguing in favor of Bittaker's claims that Norris had committed the actual murders, and claiming the testimony of the prosecutors throughout the trial amounted to little more than a "bloodlust," adding that the prosecution had repeatedly recited the "gory details" of the murders. Garber harked to the earlier testimony of a psychologist named Michael Maloney, who had testified as to Bittaker's inability to empathize with other people's feelings and emotions in addition to the fact that, with the exception of Bittaker's 1974 stabbing of Gary Louie, all of Bittaker's previous criminal convictions were for nonviolent offenses. The defense also claimed that insufficient corroborative evidence existed to convict Bittaker.

They [Bittaker and Norris] lack the internal prohibitions, or conscience, that keep most of us from giving full expression to our most primitive, and sometimes violent, impulses.

— Forensic Psychiatrist Dr. Ronald Markman, reciting conclusions of his analysis of Bittaker and Norris, 1989.

On February 17, 1981, after deliberating for three days, the jury found Bittaker guilty of five counts of first-degree murder, one charge of conspiracy to commit first-degree murder, five charges of kidnapping, nine charges of rape, two charges of forcible oral copulation, one charge of sodomy, and three charges of unlawful possession of a firearm. Deliberations as to whether Bittaker should be sentenced to death or life without parole began February 19. (Note: Prior to the counsels' deliberations pertaining to Bittaker's sentencing, Stephen Kay informed reporters: "I will not rest until the penalty of death is brought back against Lawrence Bittaker.)

The jury deliberated for just 90 minutes before they returned with their verdict: Bittaker was sentenced to death for the five counts of first-degree murder upon which the prosecution had sought this penalty. He showed no emotion as the verdict was delivered, although he did stare at the jurors. Superior Court Judge Thomas Fredericks then ordered Bittaker to appear in court on March 24 for formal sentencing.

On March 24, in accordance with the jury verdict, Bittaker was formally sentenced to death. In the event that the sentence imposed was ever reverted to life imprisonment, Judge Thomas Fredericks imposed an alternative sentence of 199 years and four months' imprisonment, to take immediate effect.

=== Imprisonment and appeals ===
Bittaker appealed his conviction and sentencing, citing procedural errors such as the validity of warrants used to authorize the search of his van and motel room, and the dismissal by the judge of a woman initially hired at the stage of jury selection to advise the defense counsel in matters relating to jury views upon the death penalty. Nonetheless, Bittaker's appeal was dismissed on June 22, 1989, with the court ruling that any procedural errors were minor and—in view of the strong evidence against Bittaker—did not affect the overall verdict.

An initial execution date for Bittaker was set for December 29, 1989. Bittaker appealed this decision, although on June 11, 1990, the U.S. Supreme Court upheld the decision that he be executed. A renewed execution date was scheduled for July 23, 1991. Bittaker again appealed the decision of the U.S. Supreme Court that he be executed, and was granted a further stay of execution on July 9, 1991.

== Aftermath ==
Bittaker granted several death row interviews following his 1981 conviction. He never expressed any remorse for his crimes, repeatedly stating the only remorse he felt had been for the fact he and Norris were arrested, thus "ruining" his own life. He corresponded with numerous individuals, responding to letters he received with the nickname "Pliers" Bittaker in reference to one of the implements he and Norris had used to torture and murder their victims.

While incarcerated, Bittaker filed more than forty frivolous lawsuits over issues as trivial as his being served a broken cookie and crushed sandwiches by the prison cafeteria, which he cited as examples of his being subjected to cruel and unusual punishment. Bittaker was declared a vexatious litigant in 1993, as a result of which he was not allowed to file lawsuits without the permission of a judge or attorney.

Despite the fact Bittaker considered his life to have been a "wasted" one and claiming to wish he "could go back and not do it", having "hurt so many people", he also marveled that he and Norris had little in common before their acquaintance at California Men's Colony in San Luis Obispo in 1977, before adding that they had "one hell of a lot in common now!"

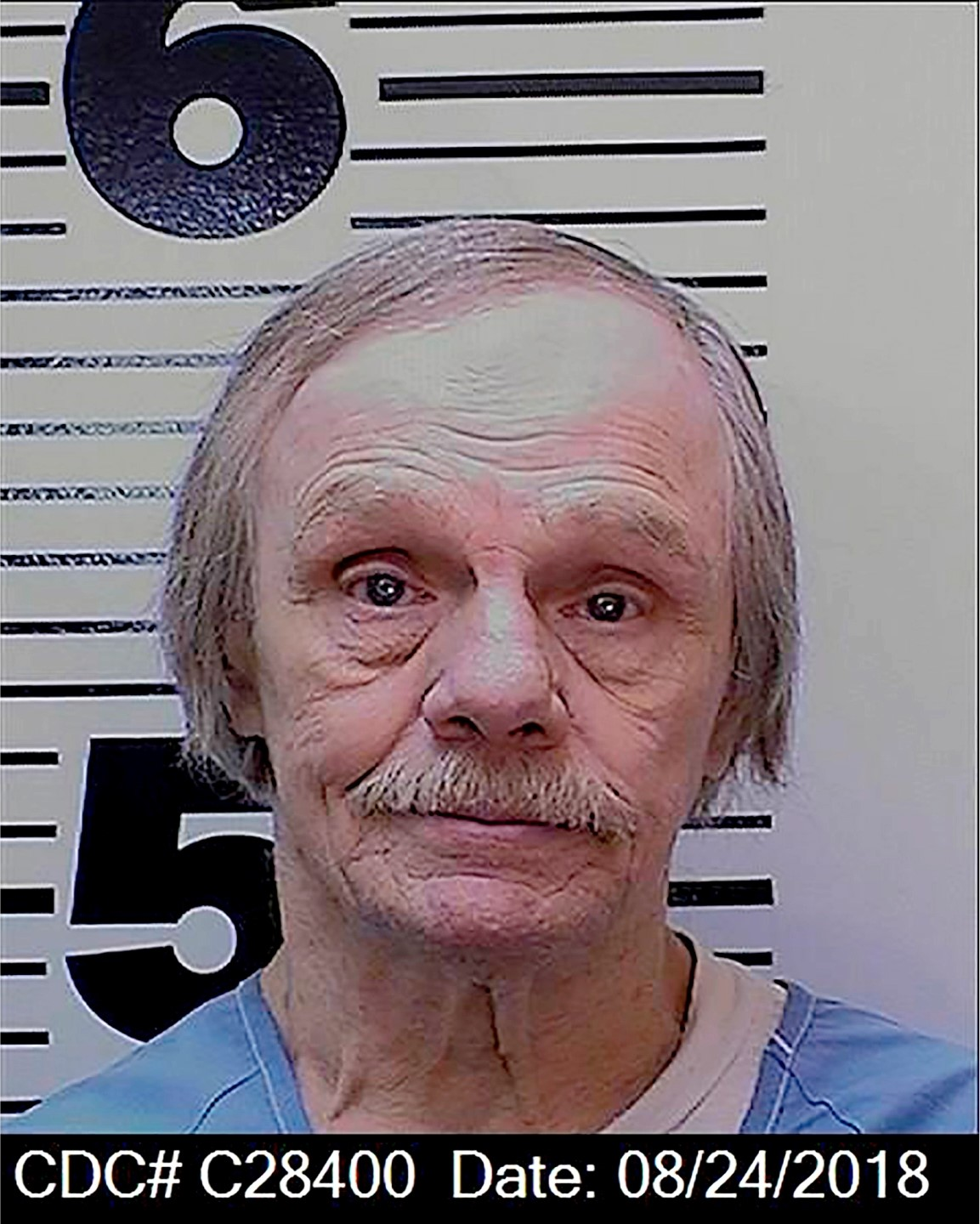
Mug shot of Bittaker (2018)

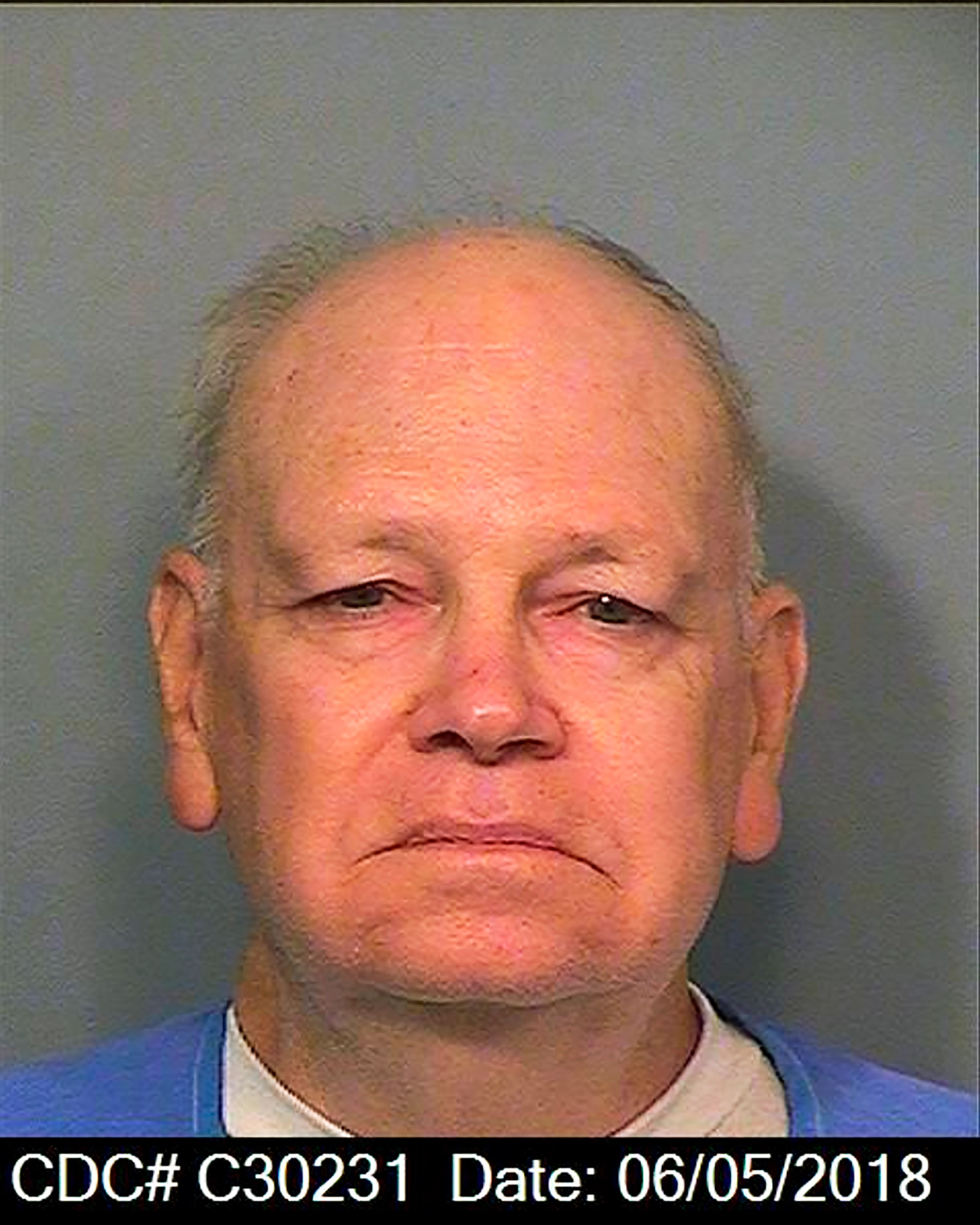
Mug shot of Norris (2018)

When asked in 2016 if he would consider writing to the victims' families, Bittaker claimed he was "too ashamed to even try and beg for forgiveness". The sincerity of his expressions of remorse have been disputed by numerous professionals, who referenced Bittaker's consistent revelling in his notoriety and who noted the fact he would tailor his outlook on his actions to one of regret to those whose attention he wished to maintain.

Bittaker died while incarcerated on death row at San Quentin State Prison on December 13, 2019, at the age of 79. His death was reported as being due to natural causes.

Norris was incarcerated at Richard J. Donovan Correctional Facility. He died of natural causes at California Medical Facility on February 24, 2020, at the age of 72, having been transferred to this facility one week prior to his death. In the years following Norris's conviction, he had repeatedly claimed the sole reason he participated in the murders was out of fear of Bittaker. Norris also claimed to have twice contemplated confessing to his and Bittaker's responsibility in the murders to the police; he also claimed to have deterred three potential victims from entering Bittaker's van.

Although Norris readily admitted that he enjoyed the acts of rape with the victims, he claimed only Bittaker enjoyed the acts of torture and murder, stating: "I didn't enjoy killing—that was Lawrence [Bittaker]. It was his favorite part: watching the women struggle to live; knowing he'd soon be taking life away."

Both investigators and psychologists have stated Norris derived equally extreme gratification from the domination, abuse, and torture inflicted upon the victims as Bittaker; these respective parties have also referenced Norris's extensive history of physical and sexual violence against women prior to his meeting Bittaker, and his repeated instances of denial of culpability for his actions.

Norris initially became eligible for parole in 2009. Norris declined to attend the parole hearing, thereby automatically deferring his parole eligibility for another ten years. He was denied parole again in 2019, and died while still incarcerated early the following year.

I'm upset that he beat the system. He died a natural death, something that his victims didn't have a chance for. They had their whole lives ahead of them; they never got to get married, have children or grandchildren.

— Stephen Kay, reflecting on news of Bittaker's death via natural causes. December 16, 2019.

Stephen Kay, the prosecutor at Bittaker's trial, still considers the murders committed by Bittaker and Norris as being the worst criminal case he has ever prosecuted or encountered and remained insistent in his belief that, prior to Bittaker's death via natural causes, he had been more deserving of being executed than any other inmate incarcerated on California's death row. In interviews, he has stated that for over two years following the trial of Lawrence Bittaker, his sleep was disturbed by recurring nightmares in which he would be rushing to Bittaker's van to prevent harm coming to the girls, but would "always get there too late."

Paul Bynum, the chief investigator of the murders committed by Bittaker and Norris, died by suicide in December 1987. He was 39 years old. In a ten-page suicide note, Bynum specifically referred to the murders committed by Bittaker and Norris as haunting him and of his fear they may be released from prison.

The audio cassette Bittaker and Norris created of themselves raping and torturing Ledford remains in the possession of the FBI Academy; this recording is used to train and desensitize FBI agents to the raw reality of torture and murder.

== Media ==
=== Film ===
- The 2012 documentary film The Devil and the Death Penalty focuses upon the murders committed by Bittaker and Norris in addition to issues relating to the death penalty appeals process in California. Stephen Kay is among those interviewed by the director.

=== Bibliography ===
- Douglas, John E.; Burgess, Ann W.; Burgess, Allen G.; Ressler, Robert K. (2006). Crime Classification Manual: A Standard System for Investigating and Classifying Violent Crimes. San Francisco: John Wiley & Sons Inc. pp. 230–235. ISBN 978-0-787-98501-1.
- Markman, Ronald; Bosco, Dominick (1990) [1989]. Alone with the Devil: Psychopathic Killings that Shocked the World. London: Piatkus Publishers. pp. 248–277. ISBN 0-7499-1002-X.

=== Television ===
- A 90-minute documentary, The Killing of America, features a section devoted to the trial of Bittaker. Directed by Sheldon Renan, this documentary was released in September 1981.
- The crime documentary series Arrest & Trial has broadcast an episode detailing the murders committed by Bittaker and Norris. This episode was initially broadcast in October 2000.
- The Investigation Discovery channel has broadcast a documentary focusing upon the murders committed by Bittaker and Norris. This documentary, titled Wicked Attraction, was initially broadcast in August 2009.
- The Toolbox Killer. Commissioned by Peacock, this 90-minute documentary contains interviews with Bittaker and FBI profiler Mary Ellen O'Toole and was initially broadcast in September 2021.

== See also ==
- Capital punishment in California
- Crime in California
- List of serial killers by country
- List of serial killers in the United States
- Violent Criminal Apprehension Program – Unit of the US Federal Bureau of Investigation

== Cited works and further reading ==
- Berry-Dee, Christopher (2010). Shared Madness: True Stories of Couples Who Kill. London: John Blake Publishing. ISBN 978-1-784-18454-4.
- Blundell, Nigel (2010). Serial Killers: The World's Most Evil. Barnsley: Pen & Sword Books. ISBN 978-1-845-63118-5.
- Brand, Laura (2026). God's Not Here, Only Devils: Revelations from the Toolbox Killers. New York: Bloomsbury Publishing Inc. ISBN 979-8-765-18951-1.
- Davis, Carol Anne (2006) [2005]. Couples Who Kill. London: Allison & Busby. pp. 17–32. ISBN 978-0-749-08175-1.
- Douglas, John E.; Olshaker, Mark (2012) [1995]. Mindhunter: Inside the FBI's Elite Serial Crime Unit. New York: Scribner Books. pp. 174–189, 411. ISBN 978-0-684-80376-0.
- Douglas, John E.; Olshaker, Mark (1996). Journey Into Darkness. United Kingdom: Arrow Books. pp. 65–66, 125, 241, 330, 364. ISBN 978-0-749-32394-3.
- Edwards, Christopher (2011). "True Detective: The Toolbox Killers". True Detective Monthly (February 2011). ISSN 0262-4133.
- Flowers, R. Barri; Flowers, H. Loraine (2004). Murders In The United States: Crimes, Killers And Victims Of The Twentieth Century. Jefferson: McFarland Publishing. p. 160. ISBN 978-0-786-42075-9.
- Fox, James Alan (2015). Extreme Killing: Understanding Serial and Mass Murder. London: Sage Publishing. pp. 85–86. ISBN 978-1-483-35072-1.
- Furio, Jennifer (1998). The Serial Killer Letters: A Penetrating Look Inside the Minds of Murderers. Philadelphia: The Charles Press. pp. 65–100, 251–261. ISBN 0-914783-84-X.
- Furio, Jennifer (2001). Team Killers: A Comparative Study of Collaborative Criminals. New York: Algora Publishing. pp. 135–141. ISBN 978-0-875-86143-2.
- Geberth, Vernon (2010). Sex-Related Homicide and Death Investigation: Practical and Clinical Perspectives, Second Edition. Oxfordshire: Taylor & Francis. ISBN 978-1-040-07980-5.
- Kessler, Ronald (1993). The FBI: Inside the World's Most Powerful Law Enforcement Agency. New York City: Pocket Books. ISBN 0-671-78658-X.
- Lane, Brian; Gregg, Wilfred (1996). The New Encyclopedia Of Serial Killers. London: Headline Book Publishing. pp. 60–62. ISBN 978-0-747-25361-7.
- Lane, Brian; Gregg, Wilfred (1995) [1992]. The Encyclopedia Of Serial Killers. New York City: Berkley Book. pp. 58–59. ISBN 0-425-15213-8.
- Levin, Jack; Fox, James Alan (1991). Mass Murder: America's Growing Menace. New York: Penguin Publishing Group. ISBN 978-0-425-12443-7.
- Lewis, Brenda (2009). Mapping the Trail of a Serial Killer: How The World's Most Infamous Murderers Were Tracked Down. Connecticut: Globe Pequot. ISBN 978-1-461-74944-8.
- Moffatt, Gregory (2008). Stone Cold Souls: History's Most Vicious Killers. California: ABC-Clio. ISBN 978-0-313-34589-0.
- Nash, Jay Robert (2004). The Great Pictorial History of World Crime. Washington, DC: Rowman & Littlefield Publishers. pp. 717–719. ISBN 978-1-442-23843-5.
- Markman, Ronald; Bosco, Dominick (1989). Alone with The Devil. London: Piatkus Publishing. pp. 248–277. ISBN 0-7499-1002-X
- Newton, Michael (2006). The Encyclopedia of Serial Killers: A Study of the Chilling Criminal Phenomenon from the Angels of Death to the Zodiac Killer. New York: Facts on File. pp. 6, 21–22, 49, 83, 149, 187, 259. ISBN 978-0-816-06987-3.
- Palmer, Louis J. (2008). Encyclopedia of Capital Punishment in the United States. Jefferson: McFarland Publishing. p. 377. ISBN 978-0-786-45183-8.
- Schechter, Harold (2003). The Serial Killers Files. New York: Ballantine Books. pp. 60–61, 65, 282, 350, 373, 404. ISBN 0-345-46566-0.
- Vickers, Marcques (2019). Murder in California: Serial Killers and Unsolved Murders. Canada: Marquis Publishing. ISBN 978-1-097-64846-7.
- Whittington-Egan, Richard; Molly Whittington-Egan (2005). Murder On File: The World's Most Notorious Killers. Glasgow: Neil Wilson Publishing. p. 19. ISBN 1-903238-91-9.
- Whittington-Egan, Richard; Whittington-Egan, Molly (1992). The Murder Almanac. Glasgow: Neil Wilson Publishing. p. 19. ISBN 978-1-897-78404-4.
