= Robert Ressler =

FBI criminal profiler (1937–2013)

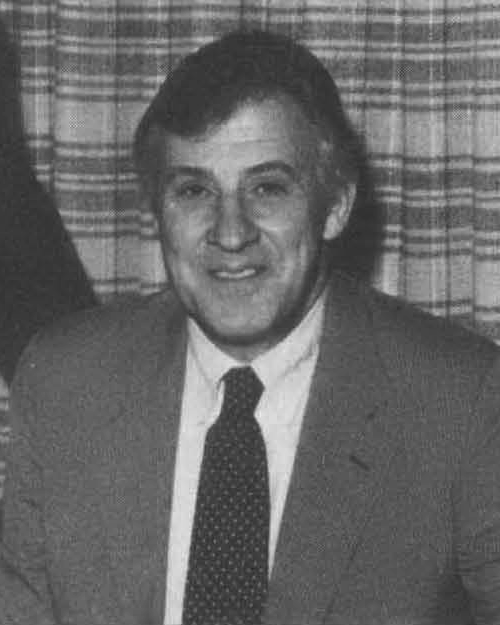
- Ressler in 1986
- Born: Robert Kenneth Ressler; February 21, 1937; Chicago, Illinois, U.S.
- Died: May 5, 2013 (aged 76); Spotsylvania County, Virginia, U.S.
- Education: Michigan State University
- Occupations: FBI agent, author
- Known for: Criminal profiling
- Military career
- Branch: United States Army
- Service years: 1957–1962
- Rank: Major

Robert Kenneth Ressler (February 21, 1937 – May 5, 2013) was an American FBI agent and author. He played a significant role in the psychological profiling of violent offenders in the 1970s and is often credited with coining the term "serial killer", though the term is a direct translation of the German term Serienmörder coined in 1930 by Berlin investigator Ernst Gennat. After retiring from the FBI, he authored a number of books on serial murders, and often gave lectures on criminology.

== Early life ==
Robert Ressler grew up on North Marmora Avenue in Chicago, Illinois, and graduated from Schurz High School, Class of 1955. He was the son of Joseph, who worked in security and maintenance at the Chicago Tribune, and Gertrude Ressler. At an early age Robert became interested in killers, as he followed the Tribune's articles on "The Lipstick Killer". Ressler claims that he was more fascinated than afraid of this notorious killer, as other killers fascinated him in his later years with the FBI. His fascination would be bolstered decades later by John Wayne Gacy, who had grown up in the same neighborhood as Ressler, and was in the Boy Scouts with him. Ressler attended two years at a community college before joining the U.S. Army and was stationed in Okinawa. After two years in the army Ressler decided to enroll in the School of Criminology and Police Administration at Michigan State University. He graduated with a bachelor's degree and started graduate work but only finished one semester before going back into the army as an officer, having also completed an ROTC program at Michigan State.

== Military career ==
Ressler served in the U.S. Army from 1957 to 1962 as a provost marshal of a platoon of MPs in Aschaffenburg, as he states in his autobiography Whoever Fights Monsters. He was in charge of solving cases such as homicides, robberies, and arson. After four years in Germany, Ressler decided to leave the position and was reassigned as the Commander of a Criminal Investigation Division (CID) at Fort Sheridan. He then went back to Michigan State to finish his master's in police administration, paid for by the army, in exchange for two more years of service after graduation. After he received his degree, he served a year in Thailand and a year in Fort Sheridan, where he ended his career with the army as a major, and moved on to the Federal Bureau of Investigation (FBI).

== FBI career ==
Ressler joined the FBI in 1970 and was recruited into the Behavioral Science Unit, which deals with drawing up psychological profiles of violent offenders, such as rapists and serial killers, who select victims at random.

Between 1976 and 1979, Ressler and criminal profiler coordinator of the Behavioral Science Unit John Douglas together organized the interviews of thirty-six incarcerated serial killers in order to find parallels between such criminals' backgrounds and motives. In addition, Ressler and retired Detective Pierce Brooks of the LAPD were instrumental in setting up Vi-CAP (Violent Criminal Apprehension Program). This consists of a centralized computer database of information on unsolved homicides. Information is gathered from local police forces and cross-referenced with other unsolved killings across the United States. Working on the basis that most serial killers claim similar victims with a standard method (modus operandi), it hopes to spot early on when a killer is carrying out crimes in different jurisdictions. This was primarily a response to the appearance of nomadic killers who committed crimes in different areas. So long as the killer kept on the move, the police forces in each state would be unaware that there were multiple victims and would just be investigating a single homicide each, unaware that other police forces had similar crimes. Vi-CAP would help individual police forces determine if they were hunting for the same perpetrator so that they could share and correlate information with one another, increasing their chances of identifying a suspect.

He worked on many cases of serial homicide such as Jeffrey Dahmer, Ted Bundy, Richard Chase and John Joubert, and Montie Rissell.

== Later life and death ==
Ressler retired from the FBI in 1990 and authored a number of books about serial murder. He actively gave lectures to students and police forces on the subject of criminology and, in 1993, was brought in, in London, to assist in the investigation into the murders committed by Colin Ireland. In 1995, Ressler met South African profiler Micki Pistorius at a conference in Scotland and she invited him to review her investigation of the "ABC Murders", so-called because of their location in the Johannesburg suburbs of Atteridgeville, Boksburg, and Cleveland. A man named David Selepe had died in police custody while being investigated as a suspect for the Cleveland murders, prior to the discovery of the Atteridgeville and Boksburg crimes, and the authorities feared that they had killed an innocent man while the real culprit was still at large. Ressler believed that Selepe was indeed responsible for the Cleveland murders, either alone or with an accomplice, and that the Atteridgeville and Boksburg murders had been committed by the same offender, but that this killer was not involved in the Cleveland murders. He also pointed out that the Atteridgeville-Boksburg murderer was gaining confidence with each killing and would contact the media. As predicted, serial killer Moses Sithole called the South African newspaper The Star to claim responsibility for the Atteridgeville and Boksburg murders, some time after Ressler left the case.

Ressler's visit to Ciudad Juárez in Mexico to investigate the still-active feminicides occurring there served as inspiration for the character Albert Kessler in Roberto Bolaño's novel 2666.

Ressler died at his home in Spotsylvania County, Virginia, on Sunday May 5, 2013, from Parkinson's disease, aged 76.

== Model for fictional characters ==
A screenplay adapted from his colleague John E. Douglas' book Mindhunter: Inside the FBI's Elite Serial Crime Unit was picked up by Netflix. Mindhunter stars Holt McCallany, who plays the character Special Agent Bill Tench, a lead character based on Ressler. In 2021, Ressler was portrayed by Jake Hays in Ted Bundy: American Boogeyman. In 2024, Ressler was portrayed by Sean Cameron Michael in the South African true-crime series Catch Me a Killer.

== Books ==
- Sexual Homicide: Patterns and Motives (with John E. Douglas, Ann Wolbert Burgess) (1988)
- Whoever Fights Monsters: My Twenty Years Tracking Serial Killers for the FBI (with Tom Shachtman) (1992)
- Justice Is Served (with Tom Shachtman) (1994)
- I Have Lived in the Monster (with Tom Shachtman) (1998)

== See also ==
- Crime Classification Manual
- FBI method of profiling
- Forensic psychology
- Investigative psychology
- Offender profiling
