= Richard Speck =

American mass murderer (1941–1991)

- Mug shot of Speck, 1966
- Born: Richard Benjamin Speck; December 6, 1941; Kirkwood, Illinois, U.S.
- Died: December 5, 1991 (aged 49); Joliet, Illinois, U.S.
- Other name: Richard Franklin Lindbergh. The Birdman
- Spouse: Shirley Malone (m. 1962; div. 1966)
- Children: 1
- Status: Deceased
- Motive: Sadism; Eyewitness elimination; Rape (Gloria Davy)
- Conviction: Murder (8 counts)
- Penalty: Death; commuted to 400 to 1,200 years imprisonment; further commuted to 100 to 300 years imprisonment

Details
- Victims: 8 killed 1 survived
- Date: July 13–14, 1966
- Country: United States
- State: Illinois
- Weapons: .22 caliber Röhm pistol (unused), switchblade
- Date apprehended: July 17, 1966
- Imprisoned at: Stateville Correctional Center

Richard Benjamin Speck (December 6, 1941 – December 5, 1991) was an American mass murderer who killed eight student nurses in their South Deering, Chicago, residence by stabbing, strangling, slashing their throats, or a combination of the three on the night of July 13–14, 1966. Speck also raped one victim before killing her. A ninth potential victim, student nurse Corazon Amurao, survived by hiding beneath a bed.

Convicted of all eight murders on April 15, 1967, Speck was sentenced to death. His sentence was reduced to 400–1,200 years in 1972. This was later reduced to 100–300 years. Speck died of a heart attack while incarcerated at Stateville Correctional Center on the eve of his 50th birthday.

== Early life and crimes ==
=== Childhood ===
Richard Benjamin Speck was born in Kirkwood, Illinois, in 1941 and was the seventh of eight children of Benjamin Franklin Speck and Mary Margaret Carbaugh. The family moved to Monmouth, Illinois, shortly after Speck's birth. He and his sister Carolyn (b. 1943) were much younger than their four older sisters and two older brothers. His mother was religious and a teetotaler. His father worked as a packer at Western Stoneware in Monmouth, having previously worked as a farmer and logger.

In 1947, when Speck was six years old, his father died from a heart attack at the age of 53. Speck was reportedly very close to his father.

On May 10, 1950, three years after the death of his father, his mother Mary married Carl August Rudolph Lindberg in Palo Pinto, Texas. She and Lindberg had met during a train ride to Chicago. Lindberg was a traveling insurance salesman from Texas, with a 25-year criminal record that ranged from forgery to several DUIs. Lindberg was also a hard drinker, unlike Speck's father. Speck and his sister Carolyn stayed with their married sister Sara Thornton in Monmouth for a few months so Speck could finish second grade, before joining their mother and Lindberg in rural Santo, Texas, 40 miles (64 km) west of Fort Worth, Texas, where Speck attended third grade.

In 1952, Speck's eldest brother, Robert, died in an automobile accident at the age of 23.

=== Dallas, 1951–1966 ===
In 1951, after a year in Santo, Speck moved with his mother, Lindberg, and sister Carolyn to East Dallas. Over the next 12 years, the family moved frequently, living at 10 different addresses, usually in poor neighborhoods. Speck loathed his stepfather who was often drunk, abusive, and frequently absent.

Speck struggled in school, refusing to wear the glasses that he needed for reading. He repeated the eighth grade at J. L. Long Jr. High School, in part because of his refusal to speak in class, motivated by a fear of people staring at him. In autumn 1957, Speck started ninth grade at Crozier Technical High School, but failed every subject. Speck did not return for the second semester, dropping out of school in January 1958, after his 16th birthday.

Speck started drinking alcohol at age 12 and by age 15, he was getting drunk almost every day. His first arrest, in 1955 at age 13 for trespassing, was followed by dozens of other arrests for misdemeanors over the next eight years.

From 1960 to 1963, Speck worked as a laborer for the 7-Up bottling company in Dallas. In October 1961, Speck met 15-year-old Shirley Annette Malone at the Texas State Fair. She became pregnant after three weeks of dating. The couple married on January 19, 1962, and initially moved in with his sister Carolyn and her husband. Speck's mother lived there as well having separated from Lindberg who was now living in California. Speck stopped using the name Richard Benjamin Lindberg when he got married and went back to using Richard Benjamin Speck. His daughter, Robbie Lynn Speck was born on July 5, 1962, while Speck was serving a 22-day jail sentence for disturbing the peace after a drunken melee in McKinney, Texas.

In July 1963, at the age of 21, Speck was sentenced to serve three years in prison after being convicted of forgery and burglary. Speck had forged and cashed a co-worker's $44 paycheck (equivalent to $463 in 2025) and also robbed a grocery store for cigarettes, beer, and $3 in cash (equivalent to $32 in 2025). He was paroled in 1965 after serving 16 months at Texas State Penitentiary in Huntsville, Texas. His release lasted a week. Speck was arrested again on January 9, 1965. Speck attacked a woman in the parking lot of her apartment building, wielding a 17-inch (43 cm) carving knife, but fled when the woman screamed. The police arrived within minutes and apprehended Speck a few blocks away. Speck was convicted of aggravated assault, given a 16-month sentence to run concurrently with a parole violation sentence, and returned to prison in Huntsville. However, due to an error, he was released just six months later upon the completion of his parole violation sentence on July 2, 1965. After his release, Speck worked for three months as a driver for the Patterson Meat Company. Although he had six accidents in the company's truck, he was only fired for failing to show up for work.

In December 1965, upon the recommendation of his mother, Speck moved in with a 29-year-old divorced woman, an ex-professional wrestler and now a bartender at his favorite bar, Ginny's Lounge, to babysit her three children. In January 1966, Malone, who had been separated from Speck, filed for divorce. That same month, Speck stabbed a man in a knife fight at Ginny's Lounge. He was charged with aggravated assault, but a defense attorney hired by his mother got the charge reduced to disturbing the peace. Speck was fined $10 (equivalent to $99 in 2025) and jailed for three days after he failed to pay the fine. This was the last time Speck was in police custody in Dallas.

On March 5, 1966, Speck bought a 12-year-old car then robbed a grocery store the following evening, stealing 70 cartons of cigarettes, which he then sold out of the trunk of his car in the grocery store's parking lot. The police traced the car (which Speck had abandoned) and issued a warrant for his arrest for burglary on March 8. Had he been apprehended under that warrant, it would have been his 42nd arrest in Dallas and would have surely resulted in another prison term. On March 9, 1966, Speck's sister Carolyn drove him to the Dallas bus depot, where he took a bus to Chicago, Illinois.

=== Monmouth, March–April 1966 ===
Speck stayed with his sister Martha Thornton and her family in Chicago for a few days, and then returned to his boyhood hometown of Monmouth, Illinois, where he initially stayed with some old family friends. Speck's brother Howard was a carpenter in Monmouth and found a job for him sanding plasterboard for another Monmouth carpenter. Speck became angry when he learned his ex-wife had remarried two days after she was granted a divorce on March 16, 1966. He moved to the Christy Hotel in downtown Monmouth on March 25 and spent most of his time in the downtown taverns. At the end of March, while Speck and some acquaintances were on a bar-hopping trip to Gulfport, Illinois they were detained overnight by police there after Speck reportedly threatened a man in a tavern restroom with his knife.

On April 3, Virgil Harris, a 65-year-old resident of Monmouth, returned home at 1:00 a.m. to find a burglar in her house brandishing a knife. He was a 6-foot-tall (180 cm) white man who was "very polite" and spoke "very softly with a Southern drawl." The man blindfolded her, tied her up, raped her, ransacked her house, and stole the $2.50 she had earned babysitting that evening.

A week later, Mary Kathryn Pierce, a 32-year-old barmaid who worked at her brother-in-law's tavern, Frank's Place, in downtown Monmouth, was last seen leaving the tavern at 12:20 a.m. on April 9. She was reported missing on April 13, and her body was found that day in an empty hog house behind the tavern. She had died from a blow to her abdomen that ruptured her liver.

Speck had frequented Frank's Place, and the empty hog house was one of several he had helped build in the preceding month, so Monmouth police briefly questioned him about Pierce's death when he showed up to collect his final carpentry paycheck on April 15 and asked him to stay in town for further questioning. When police showed up at the Christy Hotel on April 19 to continue questioning Speck, they discovered he had left the hotel a few hours earlier, carrying his suitcases and saying he was just going to the laundromat. He had instead left town. A search of his room turned up a radio and costume jewelry Mrs. Virgil Harris had reported missing from her house, as well as items reported missing in two other local burglaries in the previous month.

=== Chicago, April–June 1966 ===
On April 19, 1966, Speck returned to stay at his sister Martha's second-floor apartment at 3966 N. Avondale Ave., in the Old Irving Park neighborhood on the Northwest side of Chicago, where she lived with her husband, Gene Thornton, and their two teenage daughters. Martha had worked as a registered nurse in pediatrics before she was married, and her husband Gene worked nights as a railroad switchman. Speck told them an unbelievable story about having to leave Monmouth after refusing to sell narcotics for a "crime syndicate" there. Gene Thornton, who had served in the U.S. Navy, thought that the U.S. Merchant Marine might provide a suitable occupation for his unemployed brother-in-law, so on April 25 he took Speck to the U.S. Coast Guard office to apply for a letter of authority to work as an apprentice seaman. The application required being fingerprinted and photographed, and having a physical examination by a doctor.

Speck found work immediately after obtaining the letter of authority, joining the 33-member crew of Inland Steel's Clarence B. Randall, an L6-S-B1 class bulk ore lake freighter, on April 30. Speck's first voyage on the Clarence B. Randall was brief, since he was stricken with appendicitis on May 3, and was evacuated by U.S. Coast Guard helicopter to St. Joseph's Hospital in Hancock, Michigan, on the Keweenaw Peninsula of Michigan's Upper Peninsula where he had an emergency appendectomy.

After he was discharged from the hospital, Speck returned to stay with his sister Martha and her family in Chicago to recuperate. On May 20, he rejoined the crew of the Clarence B. Randall on which he served until June 14, when he got drunk and quarreled with one of the boat's officers and was put ashore on June 15. For the following week, Speck stayed at the St. Elmo, an East Side, Chicago flophouse at E. 99th St. & S. Ewing Ave. Speck then traveled by train to Houghton, Michigan, staying at the Douglas House, to visit Judy Laakaniemi, a 28-year-old nurse's aide going through a divorce, whom he had befriended at St. Joseph's Hospital. On June 27, after Judy gave him $80 to help him until he found work, Speck left to again stay with his sister Martha and her family in Chicago for the next two weeks.

On June 30, Speck's brother-in-law Gene drove him to the National Maritime Union (NMU) hiring hall at 2335 E. 100th St. in the Jeffery Manor neighborhood of South Deering, Chicago to file his paperwork for a seaman's card. The NMU hiring hall was one block east of five attached two-story brick townhouses, three of which were occupied by South Chicago Community Hospital senior student nurses and Filipino exchange registered nurses. Eight of these nurses lived in the easternmost townhouse at 2319 E. 100th St., just 150 feet (46 m) from the NMU hiring hall.

=== Chicago, July 1966 ===
On Friday, July 8, 1966, Speck's brother-in-law Gene drove him to the NMU hiring hall to pick up his seaman's card and register for a berth on a ship. Speck lost out that day to a seaman with more seniority for a berth on the SS Flying Spray, a C1-A cargo ship bound for South Vietnam, and returned to his sister Martha's apartment for the weekend.

By Monday, July 11, Speck had outstayed his welcome with his sister Martha and her family. After packing his bags and again being driven by his brother-in-law to the NMU hiring hall to await a berth on a ship, Speck stayed the night at Pauline's rooming house, about 1 mile (1,600 m) away at 3028 E. 96th St., in the Vets Park neighborhood of South Deering, Chicago.

On Tuesday, July 12, Speck returned to the NMU hiring hall. In mid-afternoon, he received an assignment on Sinclair Oil's tanker SS Sinclair Great Lakes, which was a 30-minute drive away in East Chicago, Indiana. When he arrived there, he found that his spot had already been taken, and he was driven back to the NMU hiring hall, which was then closed. Speck did not have enough money for a rooming house, so he dropped his bags off six blocks east at the Manor Shell filling station at 9954 S. Torrence Ave. and slept in an unfinished house just off E. 103rd St.

On Wednesday, July 13, Speck picked up his bags and checked in at the NMU hiring hall. He was angry for being sent to a non-existent assignment, and he talked for 30 minutes in the car with his sister Martha and her husband Gene, who had driven down to visit him at 9 a.m. They parked on E. 100th St. next to Luella Elementary School, across the street from the townhouses where the nurses lived. At 10:30 a.m., he was tired of waiting at the NMU hiring hall for a job. Speck had $25 that his sister had given him, and he left and walked about 1.5 miles (2.4 km) east on E. 100th St. to check in at the Shipyard Inn at E. 101st St. & S. Avenue N; the inn was an East Side, Chicago rooming house.

Speck spent the rest of the day drinking in nearby taverns before he accosted Ella Mae Hooper at knifepoint; she was a 53-year-old woman who had spent the day drinking at the same taverns that Speck had patronized. Speck took her to his room at the Shipyard Inn, raped her, and stole her black $16 mail-order .22 caliber Röhm pistol. He then left, dressed entirely in black, armed with a switchblade and Hooper's handgun. After dinner at the nearby Kay's Pilot House, Speck returned to drink at the Shipyard Inn's tavern until 10:20 p.m. and walked about 1.5 miles (2.4 km) west on E. 100th St. to the nurses' townhouse at 2319 E. 100th St.

== Murder of eight student nurses ==
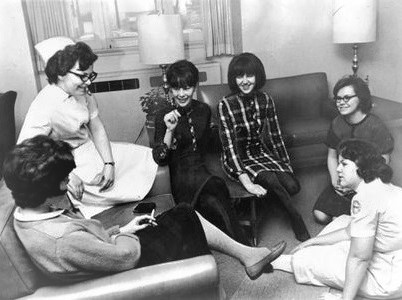
Five of the nurses murdered by Speck are seen here with nurse Judith Dykton (upper left) in 1965. Depicted clockwise bottom left to bottom right are Jordan, Farris, Schmale, Pasion, and Wilkening

At 11 p.m. on July 13, 1966, Speck broke into the 2319 E. 100th St townhouse in Chicago's Jeffery Manor neighborhood; the townhouse was functioning as a dormitory for student nurses. He entered and, using only a knife, killed Gloria Davy, Patricia Matusek, Nina Jo Schmale, Pamela Wilkening, Suzanne Farris, Mary Ann Jordan, Merlita Gargullo, and Valentina Pasion. Speck, who later claimed he was both drunk and high on drugs, may have originally planned to commit a routine burglary. Speck held the women in a room for hours, leading them out one by one, stabbing or strangling each to death, then finally raping and strangling his last victim, 22-year-old Gloria Davy. Intervals of between twenty and thirty minutes elapsed between each murder.

One woman, Corazon Amurao, escaped death because she crawled and hid under a bed while Speck was out of the room. Speck possibly lost count or might have known eight women lived in the townhouse, but was unaware that a ninth woman was spending the night. Amurao stayed hidden until almost 6 a.m. Amurao and two of the murder victims, Gargullo and Pasion, were exchange nurses from the Philippines.

Fingerprints found at the scene were matched to Speck.

Two days after the murders, a drifter named Claude Lunsford identified Speck. Speck, Lunsford, and another man had been drinking the evening of July 15 on the fire escape of the Starr Hotel at 617 W. Madison. On July 16, Lunsford recognized a sketch of the murderer in the evening paper and phoned the police at 9:30 p.m. after finding Speck in his (Lunsford's) room at the Starr Hotel. The police, however, did not respond to the call although their records showed the call had been made. Speck then attempted suicide, and the Starr Hotel desk clerk phoned in the emergency around midnight. Speck was taken to Cook County Hospital at 12:30 a.m. on July 17. At the hospital, Speck was recognized by LeRoy Smith, a 25-year-old surgical resident physician, who had read about the "Born To Raise Hell" tattoo in a newspaper story. The police were called, and Speck was finally arrested.

Concerns over the recent Miranda decision that had vacated the convictions of a number of criminals meant Speck was not even questioned for three weeks after his arrest.

== Pre-trial ==
Circuit Court Judge Herbert C. Paschen appointed an impartial panel to report on Speck's competence to stand trial and his sanity at the time of the crime—a panel of three physicians suggested by the defense and three physicians selected by the prosecution, consisting of five psychiatrists and one general surgeon. The panel's confidential report deemed Speck competent to stand trial and concluded he had not been insane at the time of the murders.

While awaiting trial, Speck participated in twice-weekly sessions with part-time Cook County Jail psychiatrist, Marvin Ziporyn. These continued after Speck's transfer from Cermak Memorial Hospital (inside Chicago's House of Corrections) on July 29, 1966, until February 13, 1967, the day before Speck was transferred to Peoria to stand trial. Ziporyn prepared a discharge summary with depression, anxiety, guilt, and shame among Speck's emotions, but also a deep love for his family. It went on to note an obsessive–compulsive personality disorder and a "Madonna-prostitute" attitude towards women. Ziporyn maintained Speck viewed women as saintly until he felt betrayed by them for some reason, after which hostility developed. Speck was also diagnosed with organic brain syndrome, resulting from cerebral injuries he had suffered earlier in his life, and stated he was competent to stand trial but was insane at the time of the crime due to the effects of alcohol and drug use on his organic brain syndrome.

Ziporyn did not testify for the defense or the prosecution, as both sides were troubled to learn before the trial that Ziporyn was writing a book about Speck for financial gain. Ziporyn also earned the ire of the Cook County Jail, which fired him as its part-time psychiatrist the week after Speck's trial ended. At some point during his interviews with Speck, Ziporyn had obtained a written three-sentence consent from Speck authorizing him to tell "what I am really like." Ziporyn's biography of Speck was published in the summer of 1967.

== Confessions ==
Fatalities
Gloria Jean Davy (22)
Suzanne Bridgit Farris (21)
Merlita Ornado Gargullo (23)
Mary Ann Jordan (20)
Patricia Ann Matusek (20)
Valentina P. Pasion (24)
Nina Jo Schmale (24)
Pamela Lee Wilkening (20)

Speck later claimed he had no recollection of the murders, but he had confessed the crime to LeRoy Smith at the Cook County Hospital. Smith did not testify, because the confession was made while Speck was sedated. Illinois Supreme Court Justice John J. Stamos, Cook County's state attorney when Speck was tried, who knew of the hospital confession, stated, "...we didn't need it. We had an eyewitness." Speck confessed to the murders for the first time in public when he spoke to Chicago Tribune columnist Bob Greene in 1978. In a film that inmates made at the Stateville Correctional Center in 1988, Speck recounted the brutal murders in detail. He again stated he was high that night, but then he undercut the idea that the drugs were a mitigating factor, asserting he could just as well have "done it sober".

== Trial ==
Speck's jury trial began April 3, 1967, in Peoria, Illinois, three hours southwest of Chicago, with a gag order on the press. In court, Speck was positively identified by the sole surviving student nurse, Corazon Amurao. When Amurao was asked if she could identify the killer of her fellow students, Amurao rose from her seat in the witness box, walked directly in front of Speck and pointed her finger at him, nearly touching him, and said, "This is the man." In addition, Lieutenant Emil Giese testified that fingerprints at the scene had been matched to Richard Speck.

On April 15, after 49 minutes of deliberation, the jury found Speck guilty and recommended the death penalty. On June 5, Judge Herbert C. Paschen sentenced Speck to die in the electric chair, but granted an immediate stay pending automatic appeal. The Illinois Supreme Court subsequently upheld his conviction and death sentence on November 22, 1968.

== XYY syndrome myth ==
In December 1965 and March 1966, Nature and The Lancet published findings by British cytogeneticist Patricia Jacobs and colleagues of a chromosome survey of patients at Scotland's only security hospital for the developmentally disabled. Nine of the patients, ranging from 5 ft 7 in (1.70 m) to 6 ft 2 in (1.88 m) height, were found to have an extra Y chromosome, the XYY syndrome. Jacobs hypothesized that men with XYY syndrome are more prone to aggressive and violent behavior than males with the normal XY karyotype, but the idea was later shown to be incorrect.

In August 1966, Eric Engel, a Swiss endocrinologist and geneticist at Vanderbilt University in Nashville, Tennessee, wrote to Speck's attorney, Cook County Public Defender Gerald W. Getty, who was reportedly planning an insanity defense. He suggested, based on Jacobs's unsubstantiated theory and Speck's height of 6 ft 1 in (1.85 m), that Speck might have XYY syndrome. A chromosome analysis performed the following month by Engel revealed that Speck had a normal XY karyotype. One month later, a court-appointed panel of six physicians rejected Getty's insanity argument and concluded that Speck was mentally competent to stand trial.

In 1968, biochemist Mary Telfer and associates published data from a genetic analysis, similar in design to Jacobs's, of subjects confined in psychiatric hospitals and penal institutions in Pennsylvania. Of the five XYY patients identified, four exhibited moderate to severe facial acne, leading the group to suggest that acne be added to the list of defining XYY characteristics. Subsequent research failed to substantiate this observation as well.

After Getty contacted Telfer to discuss her findings and their possible relevance to his client, Telfer wrote a speculative piece for the British journal Think in which she mistakenly reported that Speck had an XYY karyotype. That, combined with his extensive acne scarring, led her to describe Speck as "the archetypal XYY male".

In a three-part series on the XYY syndrome published in April 1968, The New York Times presented Jacobs's unsubstantiated theory associating the syndrome with violent behavior as an established fact, and noted that the karyotype had been cited as a mitigating factor by attorneys defending an XYY man charged with murder in Paris, and another in Melbourne. It also identified Speck as a "classic example" of an "XYY criminal" and citing Telfer and Getty as sources, predicted that XYY syndrome would form the crux of his insanity defense. Similar articles followed, again citing Telfer, in Time and Newsweek, and six months later in The New York Times Magazine.

In May 1968, Speck's chromosomes were karyotyped a second time by Engel, with the same result: a normal 46,XY genome. After Speck's conviction and death sentence were upheld by the Illinois Supreme Court later that year and the appeals process moved to the Federal court system, articles continued to appear in the lay press reporting (or implying) that Speck's supposed XYY genotype would be invoked as a mitigating factor.

In a review article published in the Journal of Medical Genetics in December 1968, Michael Court Brown found no overrepresentation of XYY males in chromosome surveys of Scottish prisons and hospitals for the developmentally and mentally disabled, and suggested that any conclusions drawn from study populations composed solely of institutionalized males were likely distorted by selection bias.

In May 1969, at the annual meeting of the American Psychiatric Association, Telfer et al. reported that they had found no evidence of significant behavior differences, on average, between men with XYY karyotypes and those with normal genomes, and that XYY males had been unfairly stigmatized by earlier unsupported speculation.

== Death penalty reversal ==
On June 28, 1971, the U.S. Supreme Court (citing their June 3, 1968 Witherspoon v. Illinois decision) upheld Speck's conviction but reversed his death sentence, because more than 250 potential jurors were unconstitutionally excluded from his jury because of their conscientious or religious beliefs against capital punishment. The case was remanded back to the Illinois Supreme Court for re-sentencing.

On June 29, 1972, in Furman v. Georgia, the U.S. Supreme Court effectively declared the death penalty unconstitutional, so the Illinois Supreme Court's only option was to order Speck re-sentenced to prison by the original Cook County court.

On November 21, 1972, in Peoria, Judge Richard Fitzgerald re-sentenced Speck to from 400 to 1,200 years in prison (eight consecutive sentences of 50 to 150 years), which was then reduced to 100 to 300 years. He was denied parole in seven minutes at his first parole hearing on September 15, 1976, and at six subsequent hearings in 1977, 1978, 1981, 1984, 1987, and 1990.

== Imprisonment ==
While incarcerated at the Stateville Correctional Center in Crest Hill, Illinois, Speck was given the nickname "Birdman" after the film Birdman of Alcatraz, because he kept a pair of sparrows that flew into his cell. He was described as a loner who kept a stamp collection and enjoyed listening to music. His contacts with the warden included requests for new shirts, a radio, and other mundane items. The warden merely described him as "a big nothing doing time." Speck was not a model prisoner; he was often caught with drugs or distilled moonshine. Punishment for such infractions never stopped him. "How am I going to get in trouble? I'm here for 1,200 years!"

Speck loathed reporters, and granted only one press interview, in 1978, to Chicago Tribune columnist Bob Greene. During that interview, he publicly confessed to the murders for the first time, and said he thought he would get out of prison "between now and the year 2000," at which time he hoped to run his own grocery store business. When Greene asked him if he compared himself to celebrity killers like John Dillinger, he replied, "Me, I'm not like Dillinger or anybody else. I'm freakish."

Speck stated that at the time of the killings, he "had no feelings," but things had changed: "I had no feelings at all that night. They said there was blood all over the place. I can't remember. It felt like nothing ... I'm sorry as hell. For those girls, and for their families, and for me. If I had to do it over again, it would be a simple house burglary." Speck's "final thought for the American people" was, "Just tell 'em to keep up their hatred for me. I know it keeps up their morale. And I don't know what I'd do without it."

In his book Mindhunter: Inside the FBI's Elite Serial Crime Unit, John E. Douglas of the FBI's Behavioral Science Unit refers to a telling prison incident Speck revealed to him in an interview: "he found an injured sparrow that had flown in through one of the broken windows and nursed it back to health. When it was healthy enough to stand, he tied a string around its leg and had it perch on his shoulder. At one point, a guard told him pets weren't allowed. 'I can't have it?' Speck challenged, then walked over to a spinning fan and threw the small bird in. Horrified, the guard said, 'I thought you liked that bird.' 'I did,' Speck replied. 'But if I can't have it, no one can.'"

=== Prison video ===
In May 1996, Chicago television news anchor Bill Kurtis received video tapes made at Stateville Correctional Center in 1988 from an anonymous attorney. Showing them publicly for the first time before the Illinois state legislature, Kurtis pointed out the explicit scenes of sex, drug use, and money being passed around by prisoners, who seemingly had no fear of being caught. In the center was Speck, performing oral sex on an inmate, sharing cocaine with another inmate, and boasting: "If they only knew how much fun I was having, they'd turn me loose." The Illinois legislature packed the auditorium to view the two-hour video, but stopped the screening when the tape showed Speck performing oral sex on another man.

He also admitted to having killed the nurses and described the experience of strangling someone: "It ain't like you see on TV. You have to go at it for about 3 1/2 minutes. It takes a lot of strength."

== Death ==
Shortly before December 5, 1991, Speck was transported from Stateville Correctional Center to Silver Cross Hospital in Joliet, Illinois after complaining of severe chest pains. Speck later died in the early morning hours of December 5, of what was believed to be a heart attack, one day shy of what would have been his 50th birthday. The coroner stated that Speck had an "enlarged heart, emphysema and clogged arteries" which most likely contributed to his fatal heart attack.

Speck's sister feared that his grave would be desecrated, so he was cremated, and his ashes were scattered in an undisclosed location in the Joliet area.

== Media ==
=== Film ===
- The 1967 film Violated Angels is a fictionalized version of Speck's murder spree, set in Japan.
- The 1976 film Naked Massacre is another fictionalized version of Speck's murder spree, set in Northern Ireland.
- The 2002 film Speck portrays Speck's murders from his perspective.
- The 2007 film Chicago Massacre: Richard Speck also portrays Speck's crimes.
- The 2012 film 100 Ghost Street: The Return of Richard Speck is a found-footage horror film featuring Speck's ghost.

== See also ==
- List of homicides in Illinois § Multiple homicides
- Most prolific murderers by number of victims
