= Chicago Massacre: Richard Speck =

- DVD released by Lionsgate Home Entertainment
- Directed by: Michael Feifer
- Written by: Michael Feifer
- Produced by: Michael Feifer
- Starring: Corin Nemec; Andrew Divoff; Tony Todd; Debbie Rochon
- Cinematography: Matt Steinauer
- Edited by: Jimmy Jamz
- Music by: Andres Boulton
- Production companies: Feifer Worldwide; North American Entertainment
- Distributed by: Barnholtz Entertainment; Lionsgate Home Entertainment
- Release date: April 15, 2007 (Beverly Hills Film Festival)
- Running time: 92 minutes
- Country: United States
- Language: English

Chicago Massacre: Richard Speck is a 2007 horror film written and directed by Michael Yungfer . The film, which premiered at the 2007 Beverly Hills Film Festival, is based on the crimes of Chicagoan mass murderer Richard Speck, and stars Corin Nemec as Speck.

== Plot ==
Growing up in rural Texas, Richard Speck is abused physically, psychologically and possibly sexually by his stepfather. Becoming a delinquent in his teenage years, Speck is eventually sentenced to psychiatric counseling, which he avoids by hopping a train out of town. Speck subsequently marries a woman named Sissy, who leaves him due to his violent, demeaning mistreatment of her. After the divorce, Speck moves to Chicago, where he makes the acquaintance of a student nurse named Sharon. One night in 1966, an intoxicated Speck, needing money for a trip to New Orleans, breaks into Sharon's dormitory, intent on robbing her and her eight roommates. Speck experiences a psychotic break during the burglary, and ends up raping and torture-murdering Sharon and seven of the other women; the sole survivor, Sondra Azano, makes it through the night by hiding under a bed.

Speck spends the proceeding days drifting in and out of motels and bars in an inebriated haze, at one point confessing his crimes to a prostitute, who he then assaults. The officers who respond to the disturbance, unaware that Speck is wanted for mass murder, merely confiscate his firearm. Speck winds up in a flophouse, where he attempts suicide by slitting his wrists. Speck survives and is hospitalized. While treating Speck, a physician realizes that he is the killer that the police are looking for after spotting the "Born to Raise Hell" tattoo on Speck's arm.

Speck is placed under arrest, and identified at the hospital by Sondra. Initially given the death penalty for his crimes, Speck's sentence is reduced to 400–1200 years, to be served in the Joliet Correctional Center. Speck refuses to attend any of his parole hearings, is uncooperative in therapy, and resigns himself to spending the rest of his life behind bars, where he dies of a heart attack in 1991. Four years later, a video of Speck (who has burgeoning breasts due to smuggled female hormones that he has been taking) doing drugs and bantering with his cellmate and lover was leaked. In the footage, the strung out Speck at one point declares, "Hell, if they knew how much fun I was havin' in here, they'd let me loose!"

== Cast ==
- Corin Nemec as Richard Speck
  - Edward Carroll as Richard Speck (age 12)
- Cherish Lee as Sharon
- Ian Patrick Williams as Harry, The Bartender
- Eliza Swords as Doris
- Kelsey McCann as Annette
- Joanne Chew as Sondra Azano
- Lynna Yee as Miranda
- Alexis Adkins as Bernice
- Jeanine Del Carloas as Vivian
- Cameo Cara Martine as Barbara Billing
- Daniel Bonjour as Detective Harper
- Tony Todd as Captain Joe Dunning
- Andrew Divoff as Detective Jack Whitaker
- Arthur Bonner as Detective McGee
- Jennifer House as Sissy Speck
- Debbie Rochon as Candy
- Joe Tong as Detective Intern Dave
- Mitchell Welch as "Left Eye"
- Caia Coley as Nurse Boyd
- John Eric Bentley as Dr. Wilkins
- Timothy Oman as Judge Petrone
- John Burke as Prosecuting Attorney Stevens
- Daniel Tostenson as Defense Attorney Getty
- Brent Fidler as Dr. Ziphoryn
- Leonard Anderson as Tyrone

== Reception ==
Arrow in the Head's Ammon Gilbert, who awarded Chicago Massacre: Richard Speck a score of 2/4, praised Corin Nemec's portrayal of Speck, but was critical of every other aspect of the film, which they found suffered from "A jumbled storyline and performances that felt rushed and uninspired." Steve Barton of Dread Central gave the film a grade of 2½ out of 5, commended the "slick direction" and "solid performances" and heavily criticized the acting of Joanne Chew, who he derided as being "one of the worst actresses I've seen in recent memory."

Michael Feifer won the award for Best Producer, while the film itself won the Audience Choice Award for Best Feature, at the 2007 Beverly Hills Film Festival.
