= Crime Classification Manual =

FBI reference on investigating crime

- First Edition
- Original title: Crime Classification Manual: A Standard System for Investigating and Classifying Violent Crimes
- Language: English
- Publication date: 1992
- Publication place: United States
- ISBN: 978-0-7879-3885-7

Crime Classification Manual: A Standard System for Investigating and Classifying Violent Crimes (1992) is a text on the classification of violent crimes by John E. Douglas, Ann W. Burgess, Allen G. Burgess, and Robert K. Ressler.

== Overview ==
The publication is a result of a project by the Federal Bureau of Investigation's National Center for the Analysis of Violent Crime.

A second edition of the book was published in 2006, and added 155 pages of new information and research.

== See also ==
- Offender profiling
- Forensic psychology
- FBI method of profiling
