= John E. Douglas =

American criminal profiler (born 1945)

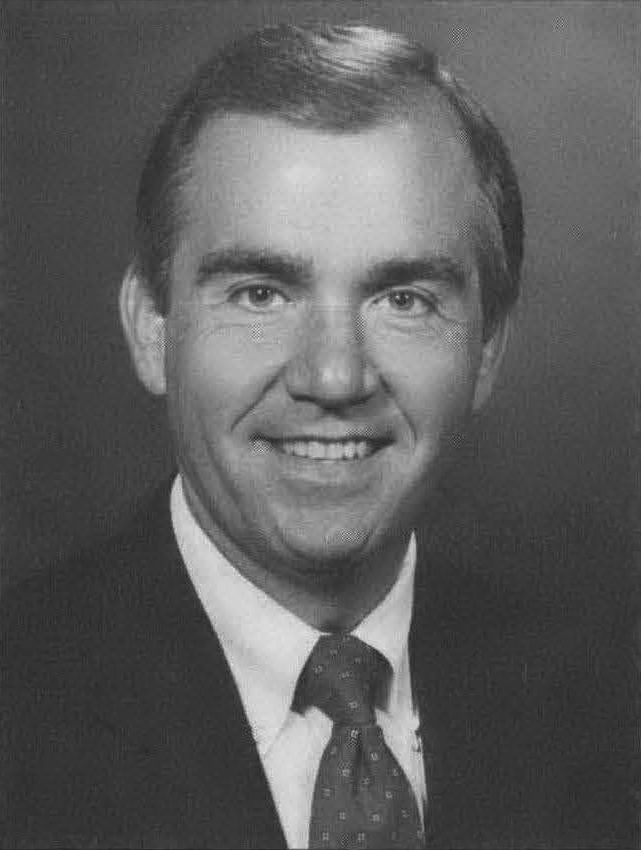
- Douglas c. 1986
- Born: John Edward Douglas; June 18, 1945 (age 81); New York City, U.S.
- Education: Eastern New Mexico University (BS); University of Wisconsin, Milwaukee (EdS, MS); Nova University (EdD)
- Occupations: FBI special agent; author
- Years active: 1970–1995
- Website: www.mindhunterfbi.com

John Edward Douglas (born June 18, 1945) is an American retired Federal Bureau of Investigation (FBI) special agent and former unit chief in its Behavioral Science Unit. He is widely recognized as one of the pioneers of criminal profiling and is the bestselling author of Mindhunter.

Douglas was among the first criminal profilers in the United States and is regarded as one of the most influential figures in the development of modern criminal profiling. His work contributed significantly to the formation and evolution of the FBI's Behavioral Science Unit, where he helped establish methods for analyzing and investigating serial and violent offenders.

He has written and co‑written numerous books on criminal psychology and notable criminal cases. His autobiographical work Mindhunter details his career in the FBI and the development of behavioral profiling. The book later served as the basis for the 2017 Netflix television series Mindhunter, produced by David Fincher and Charlize Theron.

== Early life and education ==
Douglas was born in Brooklyn, New York City, and grew up in Hempstead, New York. He had aspirations to study veterinary medicine at Cornell University, but lacked the grades to do so, and instead entered the veterinary program at Montana State University in 1963. In 1965, Douglas abandoned his studies after earning poor marks, and in 1966 began a four-year enlistment in the United States Air Force.

While in the military, Douglas finished his Bachelor of Science degree at Eastern New Mexico University. While undertaking graduate studies in psychology, Douglas met FBI agent Frank Haines in Clovis, New Mexico, who recruited Douglas into the FBI.

Douglas went on to earn an Educational Specialist degree in 1975 and a Master of Science degree in educational psychology in 1977, both at the University of Wisconsin–Milwaukee. In 1989, he earned a doctorate in education from Nova University.

== Career ==
Douglas joined the FBI in 1970 and his first assignment was in Detroit, Michigan. In the field, he served as a sniper on the local FBI SWAT team and later became a hostage negotiator. He transferred to the FBI's Behavioral Science Unit (BSU) in 1977 where he taught hostage negotiation and applied criminal psychology at the FBI Academy in Quantico, Virginia, to new FBI special agents, field agents, and police officers from all over the United States. He created and managed the FBI's Criminal Profiling Program, now called the Behavioral Analysis Unit (BAU), and was later promoted to unit chief of the Investigative Support Unit, a division of the FBI's National Center for the Analysis of Violent Crime (NCAVC).

While traveling around the country providing instruction to police, Douglas began interviewing serial killers and other violent sex offenders at various prisons. He interviewed some of the most notable violent criminals in recent history, including David Berkowitz, Ted Bundy, John Wayne Gacy, Charles Manson, Lynette Fromme, Sara Jane Moore, Edmund Kemper, James Earl Ray, Sirhan Sirhan, Richard Speck, Donald Harvey and Joseph Paul Franklin. He used the information gleaned from these interviews in the book Sexual Homicide: Patterns and Motives, followed by the Crime Classification Manual (CCM). Douglas later received two Thomas Jefferson Awards for academic excellence from the University of Virginia for his work on the study. He retired from the FBI in 1995 after 25 years.

=== Profiling ===
Douglas examined crime scenes and created profiles of the perpetrators, describing their habits and attempting to predict their next moves. In cases where his work helped to capture the criminals, he built strategies for interrogating and prosecuting them as well. At the time of criminal profiling's conception, Douglas claims to have been doubted and criticized by his own colleagues. The efficacy of profiling remains unclear and debated, as many studies have shown it is often too vague to be definitive enough to build a comprehensive criminal profile.

==== Individual cases ====
Douglas first made a public name for himself with his involvement in the Atlanta murders of 1979–81, through an interview he did with People about his profiling of the as yet unidentified killer as a young Black man. When Wayne Williams was arrested, Douglas was widely reported as stating that Williams was "looking pretty good for a good percentage of the killings". Believing that the quote was taken out of context, Douglas later clarified, "I said he fit the profile and added carefully that if it did turn out to be him, I thought he looked pretty good for a good percentage of the killings. The story hit the news wire, and the next day I was being quoted all over the country, on all the network news programs, in all the major newspapers, including a story in the Atlanta Constitution with the headline 'FBI Man: Williams May Have Slain Many'." Douglas received an official letter of censure from the FBI Director for this. However, he attended the subsequent legal proceedings and helped the prosecution trap Williams into showing anger, which was key in showing the jury that Williams was the murderer.

Douglas' profile was instrumental in the arrest and conviction of Robert Hansen. Douglas thought the killer would be an experienced hunter with low self-esteem, have a history of being rejected by women, and would feel compelled to keep "souvenirs" of his murders, such as a victim's jewelry. He also suggested that the assailant might stutter. This profile led investigators to Hansen, who fit the profile down to the stutter. Upon executing a search warrant, "souvenirs" in the form of his victim's jewelry were found at his residence.

Douglas's information was crucial to exposing an active serial killer in Shreveport, Louisiana, in the 1980s. Douglas provided information after four members of the Chaney/Culbert family were murdered in July 1985, comparing similarities discovered at the crime scene to evidence found at the homicide of Debra Ford a year earlier. Nathaniel Code was later arrested for these crimes. Douglas has written extensively in support of Amanda Knox, presenting evidence supporting her innocence in his book The Forgotten Killer. In addition, Douglas provided an analysis in the JonBenet Ramsey case and concluded that neither Ramsey's father John, her mother Patsy, nor her brother Burke were responsible for her death.

==== Later career ====
In October 2022, MasterClass announced a collaboration with Douglas in which he would teach a class on the FBI profiling method called “Think Like an FBI Profiler”.

Douglas is also a public speaker and occasionally makes public appearances. In his retirement, Douglas continues to act as a consultant and expert witness in criminal investigations and trials, both as a paid consultant and pro bono.

== In popular culture ==
In January 2015, creators of the television show Criminal Minds confirmed that the characters of FBI profilers Jason Gideon and David Rossi were based on Douglas. A screenplay adapted from the book Mindhunter: Inside the FBI's Elite Serial Crime Unit was picked up by Netflix. Mindhunter stars Jonathan Groff, who plays Special Agent Holden Ford, a character based on Douglas. Prior to the Netflix series, a TV documentary version of Mindhunter had run on MSNBC, in which Douglas interviewed other notorious serial killers such as Joseph Kondro and Donald Harvey. Many of Douglas' interviews in connection with Mindhunter subsequently featured in his books, including in The Killer Across the Table, in which Douglas provided detailed depictions of psychopathy particularly in the cases of Kondro and Joseph McGowan, who had targeted preteen girls whom they personally knew and were daughters of friends or neighbors, and of Harvey, one of the country's most prolific serial killers who used his position as a hospital orderly to commit dozens of murders of patients.

== Publications ==
=== Non-fiction ===
- Douglas, John E., Ann W. Burgess, R.N., D.N Sc., Allen G. Burgess, Robert K. Ressler. Crime Classification Manual: A Standard System for Investigating and Classifying Violent Crimes. Lexington, Massachusetts: Lexington Books. 1992. ISBN 978-0-669-24638-4
- Douglas, John E., Mark Olshaker. Mindhunter: Inside the FBI's Elite Serial Crime Unit. New York: Scribner. 1995. ISBN 978-0-671-01375-2
- Douglas, John E., Mark Olshaker. Journey into Darkness. New York: Scribner. 1997. ISBN 978-0-684-83304-0
- Douglas, John E., Mark Olshaker. Obsession: The FBI's Legendary Profiler Probes the Psyches of Killers, Rapists and Stalkers and Their Victims and Tells How to Fight Back. New York: Scribner. 1998. ISBN 978-0-684-84560-9
- Douglas, John E. Guide to Careers in the FBI. New York: Simon and Schuster. 1998. ISBN 978-0-684-85504-2
- Douglas, John E., Mark Olshaker. The Anatomy of Motive: The FBI's Legendary Mindhunter Explores the Key to Understanding and Catching Violent Criminals. New York: Scribner. 1999. ISBN 978-0-684-84598-2
- Douglas, John E., Mark Olshaker. The Cases That Haunt Us. New York: Scribner. 2000. ISBN 978-0-684-84600-2
- Douglas, John E., John Douglas' Guide to the Police Officer Exams. Kaplan Publishing. 2000. ISBN 978-0-684-85506-6
- Douglas, John E., Stephen Singular. Anyone You Want Me to Be: A True Story of Sex and Death on the Internet. New York: Scribner. 2003. ISBN 978-0-7432-2635-6
- Douglas, John E. John Douglas's Guide to Landing a Career in Law Enforcement. McGraw-Hill. 2004. ISBN 978-0-07-141717-4
- Douglas, John E., Ann W. Burgess, R.N., D.N Sc., Allen G. Burgess, Robert K. Ressler. Crime Classification Manual: A Standard System for Investigating and Classifying Violent Crimes, 2nd Edition. San Francisco: Jossey-Bass. 2006. ISBN 978-0-7879-8642-1
- Douglas, John E., Johnny Dodd. Inside the Mind of BTK: The True Story Behind the Thirty-Year Hunt for the Notorious Wichita Serial Killer. San Francisco: Jossey-Bass. 2007. ISBN 978-0-7879-8484-7
- Douglas, John E., Mark Olshaker. Law & Disorder. New York: Kensington 2013. ISBN 978-0-7582-7312-3
- Mindhunter: Inside the FBI's Elite Serial Crime Unit, October 24, 2017, with Mark Olshaker.
- Douglas, John E., Mark Olshaker. The Killer Across the Table: Unlocking the Secrets of Serial Killers and Predators with the FBI's Original Mindhunter. New York: HarperCollins. 2019. ISBN 978-0-0629-1063-9
- Douglas, John E., Mark Olshaker. The Killer's Shadow: The FBI's Hunt for a White Supremacist Serial Killer. New York: HarperCollins. 2020. ISBN 978-0-0630-7444-6
- Douglas, John E., Mark Olshaker. When a Killer Calls: A Haunting Story of Murder, Criminal Profiling, and Justice in a Small Town. 2022. ISBN 978-0-0629-7979-7

=== Fiction ===
- Douglas, John E., Mark Olshaker. Broken Wings (Mindhunters). Atria. 1999. ISBN 978-0-671-02391-1
- Douglas, John E. Man Down: A Broken Wings Thriller. (alternate title: Man Down, Vol. 2) Atria. 2002. ISBN 978-0-671-02392-8

== See also ==
- FBI Method of Profiling
- Forensic psychology
- Investigative psychology

== Bibliography ==
- Ressler, Robert K., Ann W. Burgess. John E. Douglas. Sexual Homicide: Patterns and Motives. Lexington, Mass.: Lexington Books. 1988. ISBN 978-0-669-16559-3
