= Behavioral Science Unit =

Division within the US Federal Bureau of Investigation

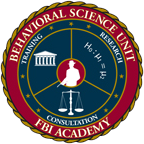
- Emblem of the Behavioral Science Unit
- Active: 1972–present (53–54 years)
- Country: United States
- Agency: Federal Bureau of Investigation
- Part of: Human Resources Branch: Training Division; FBI Academy
- Abbreviation: BSU

The Behavioral Science Unit (BSU) is the original name of a unit within the Federal Bureau of Investigation's (FBI) Training Division at Quantico, Virginia, formed in response to the rise of sexual assault and homicide in the 1970s. The unit was usurped by the Critical Incident Response Group (CIRG) and renamed the Behavioral Research and Instruction Unit (BRIU) and currently is called the Behavioral Analysis Unit (5) (BAU-5) within the National Center for Analysis of Violent Crime (NCAVC). The BAU-5 currently works on developing research and then using the evidence-based results to provide training and improve consultation in the behavioral sciences—understanding who criminals are, how they think, why they do what they do—for the FBI and law enforcement communities.

== History ==
=== 1972 ===
The FBI establishes the Behavioral Science Unit. Special agents John M. "Jack" Kirsch and Eugene "Crick" Crickenberger were tasked by Director Hoover in 1972 to form the unit, which was originally made of eleven agents, in response to the rising wave of sexual assault and homicide during the early 1970s.

=== 1976 ===
FBI Supervisory Special Agents John E. Douglas, Robert Ressler and Dr. Ann Burgess members of the Behavioral Science Unit, begin work on compiling a centralized database on serial offenders. Douglas and Ressler traveled to prisons across the United States in order to interview serial predators and obtain information about:

- Motives
- Planning and preparation
- Details of the crimes
- Disposal of evidence (e.g. bodies and murder weapons)

=== 1979 ===
After interviewing thirty-six incarcerated serial predators, Agent Douglas and Agent Ressler complete their database on serial offenders.

FBI profilers begin working out in the field and providing consultations on active cases.

=== 1984 ===
The Behavioral Science Unit split into two units, one remaining the Behavioral Science Unit (BSU) and the Behavioral Science Investigative Support Unit (BSISU). The BSU is responsible for training cadets in behavioral science at the FBI National Academy in Quantico, VA, while the BSISU is responsible for in-field investigation and consultations.

=== 1985 ===
The National Center for the Analysis of Violent Crime (NCAVC) is established in the Behavioral Science Unit at the FBI Academy. The NCAVC replaces the Behavioral Science Investigative Support Unit (BSISU), and works to give behavioral-based investigative and operational support, in regards to research and training, to federal, state, local, and international law enforcement agencies which are conducting investigations of unusual or repetitive violent crimes, terrorism, and other serious crimes.

The FBI creates the Violent Criminal Apprehension Program (VICAP). VICAP is a system of records, containing Agents Douglas and Agent Ressler's completion of data of serial offenders, containing:

- Crime scene descriptions
- Victim and offender descriptive data (e.g. names and identifying features)
- Laboratory reports
- Criminal history records
- Court records
- News media references
- Crime scene photographs and statements.

VICAP data consists of cases involving homicides, missing persons, unidentified victims, and sexual assault. This information is collected to help profilers identify and match violent crime cases based on modus operandi, signature, and disorganization or organization of the crime scenes to then help investigators understand, track, and apprehend serial offenders.

=== 1997 ===
The Behavioral Analysis Unit (BAU) created as part of the National Center for the Analysis of Violent Crime (NCAVC).

=== 2008 ===
The Behavioral Science Unit opens the Evil Minds Research Museum, where the FBI houses artifacts from serial killers and other offenders.

=== 2018 ===
The Behavioral Science Unit remains a part of the FBI Academy under the official name of Behavioral Research and Instruction Unit.

== Functions ==
The Behavioral Research and Instruction Unit is made up of agents with advanced degrees in the behavioral science disciplines of psychology, criminology, sociology, and conflict resolution. Today, members of the Behavioral Research and Instruction Unit provide programs of research, training courses, and consultation services in the behavioral sciences.

=== Training ===
==== FBI Academy ====
The Behavioral Research and Instruction Unit conducts specialized and applied training in behavioral-based topics for new FBI agents at the FBI Academy in Quantico, VA, including:

- Understanding Terrorist Mindsets and Police Response
- Countering Violent Extremism
- Relational Policing Practices
- Informative and Emerging Technologies
- Global Hostage-Taking
- Applied Behavioral Science and Criminology for Law Enforcement Operations
- Juvenile Crime and Behavior
- Conflict and Crisis Management: Theory and Practice
- Law Enforcement in the Future: Foreseeing, Managing, and Creating the 21st Century
- Managing Death Investigations
- Psycho-Social Behavior, Mindset, and Intelligence Trends of Violent Street and Prison Gangs
- Stress Management in Law Enforcement
- Problem Solving and Crisis Intervention
- Psychology of Perception and Memory
- Psychopathology

==== Law enforcement ====
The Behavioral Research and Instruction Unit offers training in the behavioral sciences to domestic and international law enforcement officers, U.S. military officers, and other governmental and academic personnel. Any such law enforcement officers or agencies must submit a written request to their local FBI field office in order to set up a training session, which depends on The Behavioral Research and Instruction Unit's resource availability and FBI training priorities.

=== Research ===
==== Databases ====
The Behavioral Research and Instruction Unit develops and facilitates relevant programs of training, research, and consultation in the behavioral sciences for the FBI workforce, military intelligence, and law enforcement.

A necessary resource for this job is a central body of information and applied research in specialty areas on significant behavioral science issues. The Behavioral Research and Instruction Unit compiles research programs (such as VICAP) containing evidence to help improve behavior analyses; this evidence is reviewed by an outside board of scientific and academic experts to ensure that research is valid and is scientifically and academically accepted. These structured professional judgment tools are used to identify and measure human belief states, cognitive behavior, potential threat, or deception.

These research databases are used by the Behavioral Research and Instruction Unit for specialized and applied training courses and by intelligence analysts for in-field services.

==== Evil Minds Research Museum ====
The Evil Minds Research Museum, located in the FBI Academy, collects items and artifacts that were owned, created, or used by serial killers–ideally their personal possessions–that were seized through search warrants or donated by their families. All access to the museum is restricted to FBI agents, police personnel, and special guests of the Behavioral Research and Instruction Unit.

== Legacy ==
=== The term "serial killer" ===
FBI agent Ressler, a member of the original Behavioral Science Unit, is credited with coining the term "serial killer" in the year 1974.

Ressler was lecturing at a British police academy in Bramshill, England, when he overheard an officer describing some crime (sexual assaults, robberies, arsons, burglaries, and homicides) as occurring in a series. Ressler said that the police officer's description reminded him of a movie-industry term “serial adventures”—short episodic films featured in theaters on Saturday afternoons during the 1930s and 1940s which relied on cliffhanger endings to draw audiences back each week. Cliffhanger endings ensure that a single "serial adventure" never has a satisfactory conclusion, and as Ressler said each ending built off of the previous episode's tension.

Ressler believed that, similar to "serial adventures," the conclusion of each crime in the series only increased the criminal's tensions and desires. The crime never satisfies the criminal's ideal fantasy, so serial criminals are instead agitated toward repeating their crimes in an unending “serial” cycle, hence the terms "serial killer" and "serial rapist".

=== Criminal profiling ===
Criminal profiling, also known as offender profiling, is the process of viewing a crime from a behavioral perspective in order to identify behavioral tendencies, personality traits, geographic location, demographics, and biographical features of an offender.

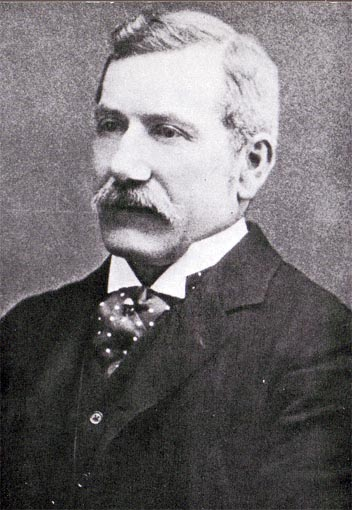
Thomas Bond, a British police surgeon who profiled Jack the Ripper in 1888

One of the earliest recorded criminal profiles was assembled by Metropolitan Police in Whitechapel, London, during the Jack the Ripper case. Upon request from the Police Department, the Police surgeon Thomas Bond offered a basic profile of Jack the Ripper based on his post mortem examination of the canonical victims. Based on the killer's anatomical understandings, the surgical skill of the brutal mutilations, as well as the sexual nature of the murders, Bond surmised that the serial killer (who later came to be known as Jack the Ripper) was a male with basic medical knowledge harboring misogynistic rage.

The first known successful (though only semi-accurate) criminal profile was the one compiled by the psychiatrist James Brussel on New York City's Mad Bomber in 1956. After 16 years of fruitless investigation into bombings cases, the New York Police Department (NYPD) requested the assistance of Brussel. Though the media dubbed Brussel "The Sherlock Holmes of the Couch," many of Brussel's predictions related to physical and biological descriptors—that he wore a buttoned-up double-breasted suit or that he was a foreigner—had been inaccurate. Some psychological aspects of Brussel's profile that were based on Brussel's experience and expertise were accurate—that the suspect suffered from paranoia for example—and assisted the NYPD in their investigation.

Though criminal profiling dates further back than the Behavioral Science Unit, it was the unit's adoption of psychological profiling techniques along with Agents Ressler and Douglas' work interviewing serial killers across the United States and compiling a database holding this information that established criminal profiling as an acceptable investigative tool. Prior to their work, criminal profiling had never been used during an active investigation; instead it was often a last resort in cold cases.

Today, there are multiple techniques and methods of criminal profiling. The FBI's method of criminal profiling, used by the Behavioral Analysis Unit and taught by the Behavioral Research and Instruction Unit at the FBI Academy, is known as criminal investigative analysis (CIA). There are 6 steps involved in the process of creating a criminal profile with the method of criminal investigative analysis:

- Profiling inputs
- Decision process models
- Crime assessment
- Criminal profiling
- Investigation
- Apprehension
