= Investigative psychology =

In applied psychology, investigative psychology attempts to describe the actions of offenders and develop an understanding of crime. This understanding can then help solve crimes and contribute to prosecution and defense procedures. It brings together issues in the retrieval of investigative information, the drawing of inferences about that information and the ways in which police decision making can be supported through various systems derived from scientific research. It should not be confused with profiling which grew out of the experience of police officers offering opinions to their colleagues about the possible characteristics of unknown offenders.

== Overview ==
Investigative Psychology grows directly out of empirical research and logical inference to cover the full range of investigative activities not only the preparation of 'profiles'. The inference processes at the heart of Investigative Psychology contrast with the approach used in the Federal Bureau of Investigation which emphasises subjective processes such as "thinking like the criminal". This field provides a system for the integration of many aspects of psychology into all areas of police investigations and forms of crime. Investigative Psychology stresses that the results of scientific psychology can contribute to many aspects of civilian and criminal investigation, including the full range of crimes from burglary to terrorism, not just those extreme crimes of violence that have an obvious psychopathic component.

== Research ==
The contribution to investigations draws on the extent to which an offender displays various tested characteristics. as well as procedures for enhancing the processes by which interviews are carried out or information is put before the courts. One aim of investigative psychology research is determining behaviourally important and empirically supported information regarding the consistency and variability of the behaviour of many different types of offenders, although to date most studies have been of violent crimes there is a growing body of research on burglary and arson. It is also important to establish valid and reliable methods of distinguishing between offenders and between offences.

Already the use of statistical analysis techniques such as Multi dimensional scaling in offender profiling has provided support for a theoretical distinction between homicide offenders as either instrumental (43% of offenders) or expressive (31% of offenders) in their use of aggression. The most recent advances have seen the development of a Narrative Action System Model for differentiating criminals' styles of offending, allowing empirically based 'modus operandi' to be identified within a broad range of offence types from sexual assault and serial murder to stalking, burglary and robbery. This method of analysis has also expanded upon the original theoretical distinction by identifying sub-themes of aggressive action which can be used to further discriminate amongst offenders (Santilla, Hakkanen, Canter & Elfgren, 2003). These behavioural themes have also been linked to background characteristics and post-offence behaviour, demonstrating their usefulness to the investigation of serial murder cases. The development and application of these techniques to serial offenders is likely to facilitate an increase in the validity of offender profiling of serial murderers.

== See also ==
- Forensic psychology
- Offender profiling
- FBI method of profiling
