= FBI method of profiling =

Identify perpetrators of crime by their behaviour

The FBI method of profiling is a system created by the Federal Bureau of Investigation (FBI) used to detect and classify the major personality and behavioral characteristics of an individual based upon analysis of the crime or crimes the person committed.

== Development ==
One of the first American profilers was FBI agent John E. Douglas, who was also instrumental in developing the behavioral science method of law enforcement.

The ancestor of modern profiling, R. Ressler (FBI), considered profiling as a process of identifying all the psychological characteristics of an individual, forming a general description of the personality, based on the analysis of the crimes committed by him.

== Profiling phases ==
The process this approach uses to determine offender/criminal characteristics involves:

1. An assimilation phase where all information available in regard to the crime scene, victim, and witnesses is examined. This may include photographs of the crime scene, autopsy reports, victim profiles, police reports, and witness statements.
2. The "classification stage", which involves integrating the information collected into a framework which essentially classifies the murderer as "organized" or "disorganized". Organized murderers are thought to have advanced social skills, plan their crimes, display control over the victim using social skills, leave little forensic evidence or clues, and often engage in sexual acts with the victim before the murder. In contrast, the disorganized offender is described as impulsive, with few social skills, such that his/her murders are opportunistic and crime scenes suggest frenzied, haphazard behavior and a lack of planning or attempts to avoid detection. They might engage in sexual acts after the murder because they lack knowledge of normal sexual behavior.
3. Following the classification stage profilers attempt to reconstruct the behavioral sequence of the crime, in particular, attempting to reconstruct the offender's modus operandi or method of committing the crime.
4. Profilers also examine closely the offender's "signature" which is identifiable from the crime scene and is more idiosyncratic than the modus operandi—the signature is what the offender does to satisfy his psychological needs in committing the crime.
5. From further consideration of the modus operandi, the offender's signature at the crime scene, and also an inspection for the presence of any staging of the crime, the profiler moves on to generate a profile. This profile may contain detailed information regarding the offender's demographic characteristics, family characteristics, military background, education, personality characteristics, and it may also suggest to the investigator the appropriate interview/interrogation techniques to adopt.

== Criticism ==
Much criticism surrounding the FBI process of profiling focuses on the validity of the classification stage. In particular, the criticism targets the organized versus disorganized dichotomy and its theoretical and empirical foundations and assumptions. This approach has become commonly used in the classifications of violent serial offenders. The only available study that examines the reliability of the classification system involved the reading of a sexual-homicide case summary. In this study, inter-rater reliability was found to be between 51.7% and 92.6%.

This study, although dated, does provide limited support for the reliability of the FBI sexual-homicide classification system. However, this form of reliability contributes little to the usefulness of the offender profiling system if the classification is not effective. The FBI classification system is derived from a single interview-based research study with a small sample of apprehended serial killers who operated in North America.

The ecological validity of the FBI's classification system considering its limitations has also been criticized. Further limitations of the original study include the subject selection process that relied on non-random self-selection, and the extensive use of potentially biased data. The interviews were unstructured and led in an ad hoc fashion that was dependent on the interviewees. The process whereby participants were divided into groups based on organized or disorganized characteristics and behaviors has been described as the product of circular reasoning, involving the "reification of a concept" in contrast to an empirical validation of this concept.

The organized/disorganized dichotomy is further flawed in that it fails to meet the criteria of a typology. David Canter examined the relationship between the behavioral styles and background characteristics of 100 serial-homicide offenders using a multidimensional scaling (MDS) procedure called smallest-space analysis (SSA) that statistically represents the co-occurrence of variables. No evidence was found to support the co-occurrence of behavioral styles or background characteristics related to the organized/disorganized taxonomy as proposed in the Crime Classification Manual (CCM).

== See also ==
- Forensic psychology
- Offender profiling
- Investigative psychology
