= Mindhunter: Inside the FBI's Elite Serial Crime Unit =

1995 book by John E. Douglas

- First edition cover
- Author: John E. Douglas; Mark Olshaker
- Language: English
- Subject: Serial killers and mass murderers
- Published: 1995
- Publication place: United States
- Media type: Print, e-book, audiobook
- ISBN: 978-0-684-80376-0

Mindhunter: Inside the FBI's Elite Serial Crime Unit is a 1995 non-fiction crime book written by retired FBI agent John E. Douglas and his co-author Mark Olshaker.

== Description ==
The book details Douglas's "criminal-personality profiling" on serial killers and mass murderers, which he developed over decades of interviews with known killers. The book includes profiles of the Atlanta child killer, David Carpenter, Edmund Kemper, Robert Hansen, and Larry Gene Bell, and suggests proactive steps on luring culprits to contact the police. The book omits the work of Ann Burgess, a psychiatric nurse and researcher who helped establish a scientific foundation for criminal profiling working with agent Douglas.

== Adaptation ==
The Netflix series Mindhunter (2017-2019) drew inspiration heavily from the book.
