= Critics' Choice Super Award for Best Actress in an Action Series =

Television series award

Critics' Choice Super Award for Best Actress in an Action Series, Limited Series or Made-for-TV Movie
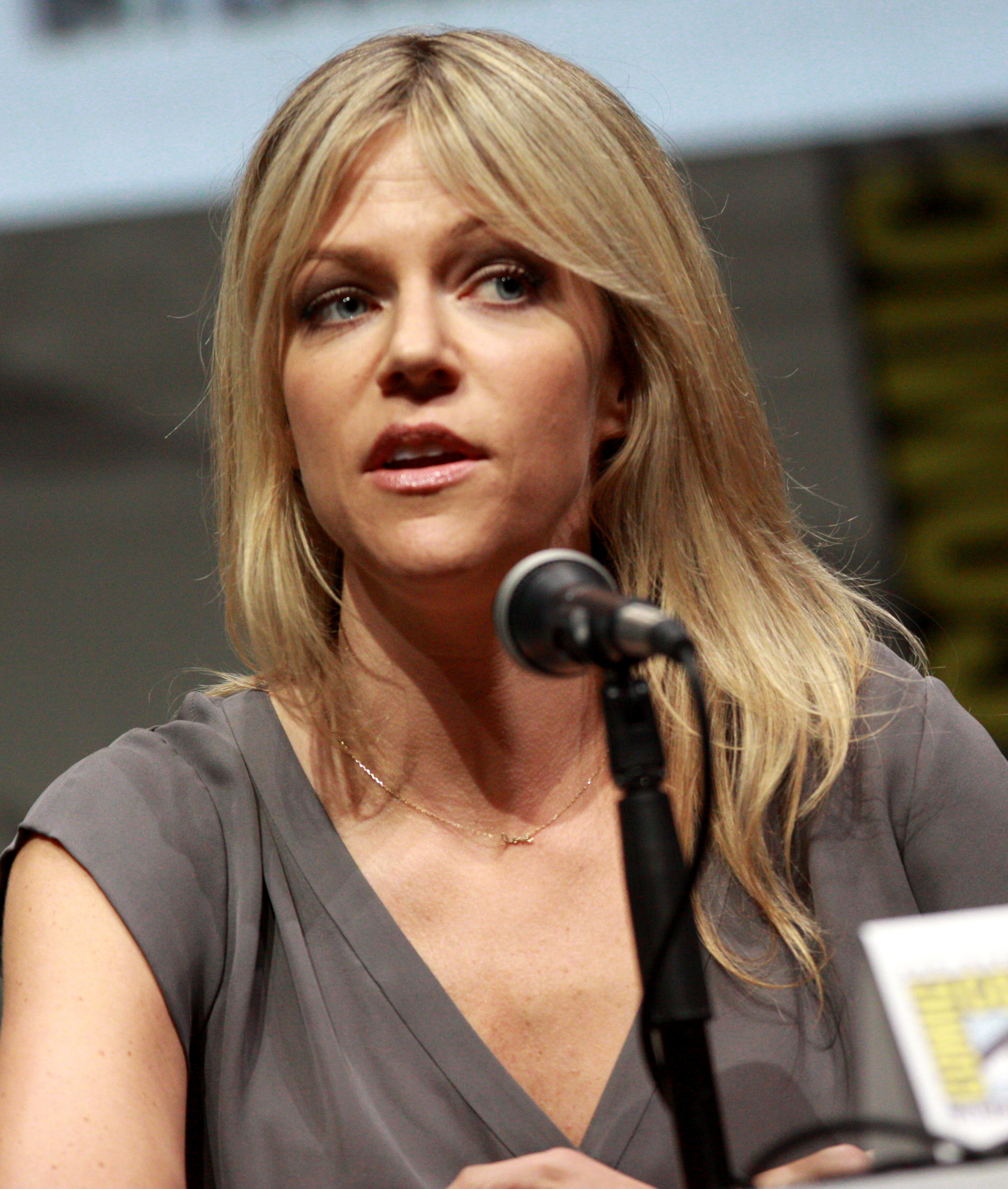
- The 2026 recipient: Kaitlin Olson
- Country: United States
- Presented by: Critics Choice Association
- First award: 2021
- Currently held by: Kaitlin Olson, High Potential (2026)

Highlights
- Most nominations: Angela Bassett (6)
- Website: http://www.criticschoice.com/

The Critics' Choice Super Award for Best Actress in an Action Series, Limited Series or Made-for-TV Movie is an award presented by the Critics Choice Association to the best performance by a female actress in an action television series or TV-movie.

This award was first presented in 2021 to Angela Bassett for her role as Athena Carter Grant Nash on 9-1-1. Bassett also holds the record for most nominations, with six consecutive nods for the same role.

The current recipient of the award is Kaitlin Olson for her role as Morgan Gillory in High Potential.

== Winners and nominees ==
Year	Actress	Role	Series	Network	Ref
Best Actress in an Action Series
2021	Angela Bassett	Athena Grant-Nash	9-1-1	Fox	
2021	Jennifer Connelly	Melanie Cavill	Snowpiercer	TNT	
2021	Esmé Creed-Miles	Hanna	Hanna	Amazon Prime Video	
2021	Mireille Enos	Marissa Wiegler	Hanna	Amazon Prime Video	
2021	Katheryn Winnick	Lagertha	Vikings	History	
2021	Alison Wright	Ruth Wardell	Snowpiercer	TNT	
2022	HoYeon Jung	Kang Sae-byeok	Squid Game	Netflix	
2022	Angela Bassett	Athena Grant-Nash	9-1-1	Fox	
2022	Kim Joo-ryoung	Han Mi-nyeo	Squid Game	Netflix	
2022	Queen Latifah	Robyn McCall	The Equalizer	CBS	
2022	Olivia Liang	Nicky Shen	Kung Fu	The CW	
2022	Mary McCormack	Willie Day	Heels	Starz	
Best Actress in an Action Series, Limited Series or Made-for-TV Movie
2023	Helen Mirren	Cara Dutton	1923	Paramount+	
2023	Angela Bassett	Athena Grant-Nash	9-1-1	Fox	
2023	Queen Latifah	Robyn McCall	The Equalizer	CBS	
2023	Olivia Liang	Nicky Shen	Kung Fu	The CW	
2023	Katherine McNamara	Abby Walker	Walker: Independence	The CW	
2023	Kelly Reilly	Beth Dutton	Yellowstone	Paramount Network	
2024	Zoe Saldaña	Joe McNamara	Special Ops: Lioness	Paramount+	
2024	Angela Bassett	Athena Grant-Nash	9-1-1	Fox	
2024	Luciane Buchanan	Rose Larkin	The Night Agent	Netflix	
2024	Priyanka Chopra Jonas	Nadia Sinh	Citadel	Amazon Prime Video	
2024	Queen Latifah	Robyn McCall	The Equalizer	CBS	
2024	Maria Sten	Frances Neagley	Reacher	Amazon Prime Video	
2025	Anna Sawai	Toda Mariko	Shōgun	FX	
2025	Angela Bassett	Athena Grant-Nash	9-1-1	ABC	
2025	Viola Davis	Danielle Sutton	G20	Amazon Prime Video	
2025	Keira Knightley	Helen Webb	Black Doves	Netflix	
2025	Lashana Lynch	Bianca Pullman	The Day of the Jackal	Peacock	
2025	Zoe Saldaña	Joe McNamara	Lioness	Paramount+	
2026	Kaitlin Olson	Morgan Gillory	High Potential	ABC	
2026	Angela Bassett	Athena Grant-Nash	9-1-1	ABC	
2026	Julianne Nicholson	Samantha "Sinatra" Redmond	Paradise	Hulu	
2026	Gloria Reuben	Mae Silver	Boston Blue	CBS	
2026	Octavia Spencer	Debbie	Ride or Die	Amazon Prime Video	
2026	Hannah Waddingham	Judith	Ride or Die	Amazon Prime Video	

== Series with multiple nominations ==
6 nominations

- 9-1-1

3 nominations

- The Equalizer

2 nominations

- Hanna
- Kung Fu
- Lioness
- Ride or Die
- Snowpiercer
- Squid Game

== Performers with multiple nominations ==
6 nominations

- Angela Bassett

3 nominations

- Queen Latifah

2 nominations

- Olivia Liang
- Zoe Saldaña

== See also ==
- Critics' Choice Super Award for Best Action Series
- Critics' Choice Super Award for Best Actor in an Action Series
