= The Further Mis-Adventures of Cliff Booth =

Upcoming film by David Fincher

- Theatrical release poster
- Directed by: David Fincher
- Written by: Quentin Tarantino
- Produced by: Peter Mavromates; Ceán Chaffin; Brad Pitt
- Starring: Brad Pitt; Elizabeth Debicki; Scott Caan; Yahya Abdul-Mateen II; Carla Gugino; Peter Weller; Matt Groove; JB Tadena; Corey Fogelmanis; Karren Karagulian
- Cinematography: Erik Messerschmidt
- Edited by: Kirk Baxter
- Music by: Trent Reznor; Atticus Ross
- Production company: Plan B Entertainment
- Distributed by: Netflix
- Release dates: November 16, 2026 (Los Angeles); November 25, 2026 (United States); December 23, 2026 (Netflix)
- Running time: 143 minutes
- Country: United States
- Language: English
- Budget: $200 million

The Further Mis-Adventures of Cliff Booth is a 2026 American crime dramedy film directed by David Fincher and written by Quentin Tarantino. Produced by Peter Mavromates, Ceán Chaffin, and Brad Pitt, it is a stand-alone sequel and spin-off to Once Upon a Time in Hollywood (2019), with Pitt reprising his role as stunt double Cliff Booth. The ensemble cast also features Elizabeth Debicki, Scott Caan, Yahya Abdul-Mateen II, Carla Gugino, Peter Weller, Matt Groove, JB Tadena, Corey Fogelmanis, and Karren Karagulian.

In April 2025, it was reported that Netflix acquired the script from Tarantino. Pitt approached Fincher, with whom he had previously worked on Seven (1995), Fight Club (1999) and The Curious Case of Benjamin Button (2008), to direct the film. Casting began the following month, and principal photography took place in Los Angeles from July 2025 to January 2026. With a budget of $200 million, it is both Tarantino and Fincher's most expensive film.

The Further Mis-Adventures of Cliff Booth had its world premiere in Los Angeles on November 16, 2026. The film is scheduled to be released exclusively in IMAX (a first for Netflix) on November 25, 2026 for a two-week engagement, before becoming available to stream on December 23.

== Premise ==
Set in 1977 Los Angeles, eight years after the events of Once Upon a Time in Hollywood, the film follows former stuntman Cliff Booth, who has become a Hollywood "studio fixer".

== Cast ==
- Brad Pitt as Cliff Booth, a Hollywood studio fixer and former stuntman
- Elizabeth Debicki as Karen Crosby, a high-profile talent agent and Cliff's love interest
- Scott Caan as Charlie Peters, a popular television star and Karen's client
- Yahya Abdul-Mateen II as Roderick "Hot Rod" Harrison, a retired Oakland Raiders player-turned-movie star
- Carla Gugino as Toni Peters, Charlie's wife and Cliff's former lover
- Peter Weller as Gus Booth, Cliff's father
- Matt Groove as Eddie Verdusco, a Filipino gangster and Fernando's brother
- JB Tadena as Fernando Verdusco, a Filipino gangster and Eddie's brother
- Corey Fogelmanis as Joey, a small-time young hustler on Santa Monica Boulevard
- Karren Karagulian as Chicken Hawk, a criminal and Joey's associate
- Holt McCallany
- Timothy Olyphant as James Stacy
- Barry Livingston
- Lauren Glazier

== Production ==
=== Development and casting ===
In July 2021, when asked about Once Upon a Time in Hollywood (2019) character Cliff Booth's time during World War II, Quentin Tarantino stated, "Someday I'll do his adventure in the POW camp". In March 2023, Tarantino revealed that he had completed a screenplay titled The Movie Critic, centered on a film reviewer who wrote for the fictional pornographic magazine The Popstar Pages in 1977 California. By April 2024, multiple reports indicated that the project had evolved into a continuation of the Cliff Booth character following the events of Once Upon a Time in Hollywood, with Brad Pitt expected to reprise the role, before the film was ultimately canceled. However, in an August 2025 interview with The Hollywood Reporter, Tarantino contradicted those reports, stating that The Movie Critic "would have been a spiritual successor to Once Upon a Time in Hollywood, but there were no crossover characters. Cliff Booth was never in The Movie Critic."

In April 2025, David Fincher was reported to have been hired to direct a sequel to Once Upon a Time in Hollywood written by Tarantino, with Netflix having acquired the script and Pitt reprising his role as Cliff Booth while Leonardo DiCaprio was reportedly in talks to reprise his role as Rick Dalton in a cameo appearance. DiCaprio ultimately turned down the cameo appearance, stating, "there were some talks about it early on ... but I'm not in it. I think David Fincher's the perfect man for the job ... there's nobody better to carry on that lineage and tell that story." Pitt later elaborated that DiCaprio's brief return - as scripted - required extensive, unflattering prosthetics, which would've necessitated more commitment from DiCaprio then he was interested in. Pitt was instrumental in approaching Fincher to direct the film. It was reported by Deadline Hollywood later that same month that the film would be called The Continuing Adventures of Cliff Booth and would follow Booth as a Hollywood studio fixer. Tarantino later elaborated on his decision to not direct the film as his final project stating: "I love this script, but I'm still walking down the same ground I've already walked. It just kind of unenthused me. This last movie, I've got to not know what I'm doing again. I've got to be in uncharted territory".

In May 2025, Elizabeth Debicki and Scott Caan joined the cast. In June 2025, Pitt told Deadline, "This is something Quentin Tarantino wrote. It's an episode, not really a sequel, of the character from Once Upon a Time. He didn't want to direct it at this point, so our friend David Fincher stepped in." In the same month, reports revealed that the film received a $20 million allocation from the California Film and Television Tax Credit Program. Initially listed as an untitled Netflix production, the project was identified as The Adventures of Cliff Booth. The production was expected to generate $105.9 million in qualified expenditures in California, with 110 filming days in the state, employing 128 cast members and 428 crew members. Yahya Abdul-Mateen II, Carla Gugino and Holt McCallany joined the cast in the same month, before the title was shortened to The Adventures of Cliff Booth. In July, JB Tadena, Corey Fogelmanis and Karren Karagulian joined the cast, while David Heyman, Ceán Chaffin and Stacey Sher were added as producers, alongside Tarantino and Pitt.

In an August 2025 episode of the The Church of Tarantino Podcast, when asked about his role the production of The Adventures of Cliff Booth, Tarantino stated, "it's a little more like I've given David [Fincher] a gigantic novel written in screenplay form, and it's his job to attack it ... No, I'm not like [some] Hollywood screenwriter that's like, 'Here you go. Here's your 120 pages. Shoot seven [pages] a day. You should be fine.' No, no, I'm giving [Fincher] an unwieldy thing, and I haven't tamed myself whatsoever. And it's his job to shrink it ... I'm one of the producers on the movie and everything. But look, I'm moving back and forth between here and Israel, so I won't be on the set every day and everything ... I'll be around if they need me to do something." He also described the budget for the film as the largest he has ever been associated with, adding that the film is going to be "in the region of $200 million". In the same month, Timothy Olyphant was set to reprise his role as James Stacy from Once Upon a Time in Hollywood. In September 2025, Barry Livingston revealed he was a part of the cast. Lauren Glazier and Peter Weller were revealed to be a part of the cast in October 2025.

In March 2026, Pitt was reportedly paid $40 million to star in and produce the film, and Fincher received $20 million, while writer and producer Tarantino was paid more than $20 million for a one-picture license to his screenplay, while retaining ownership of the underlying work.

=== Filming ===
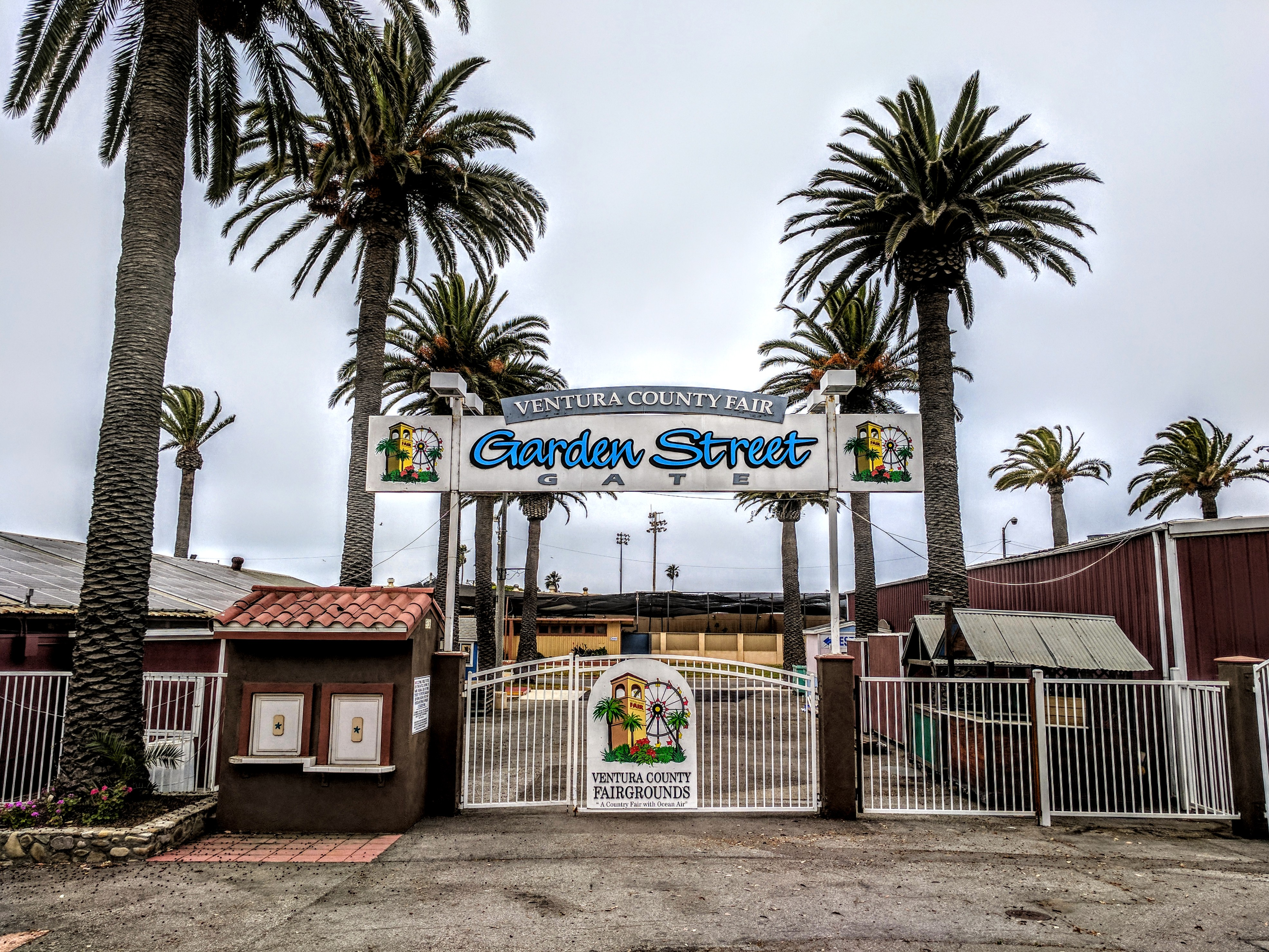
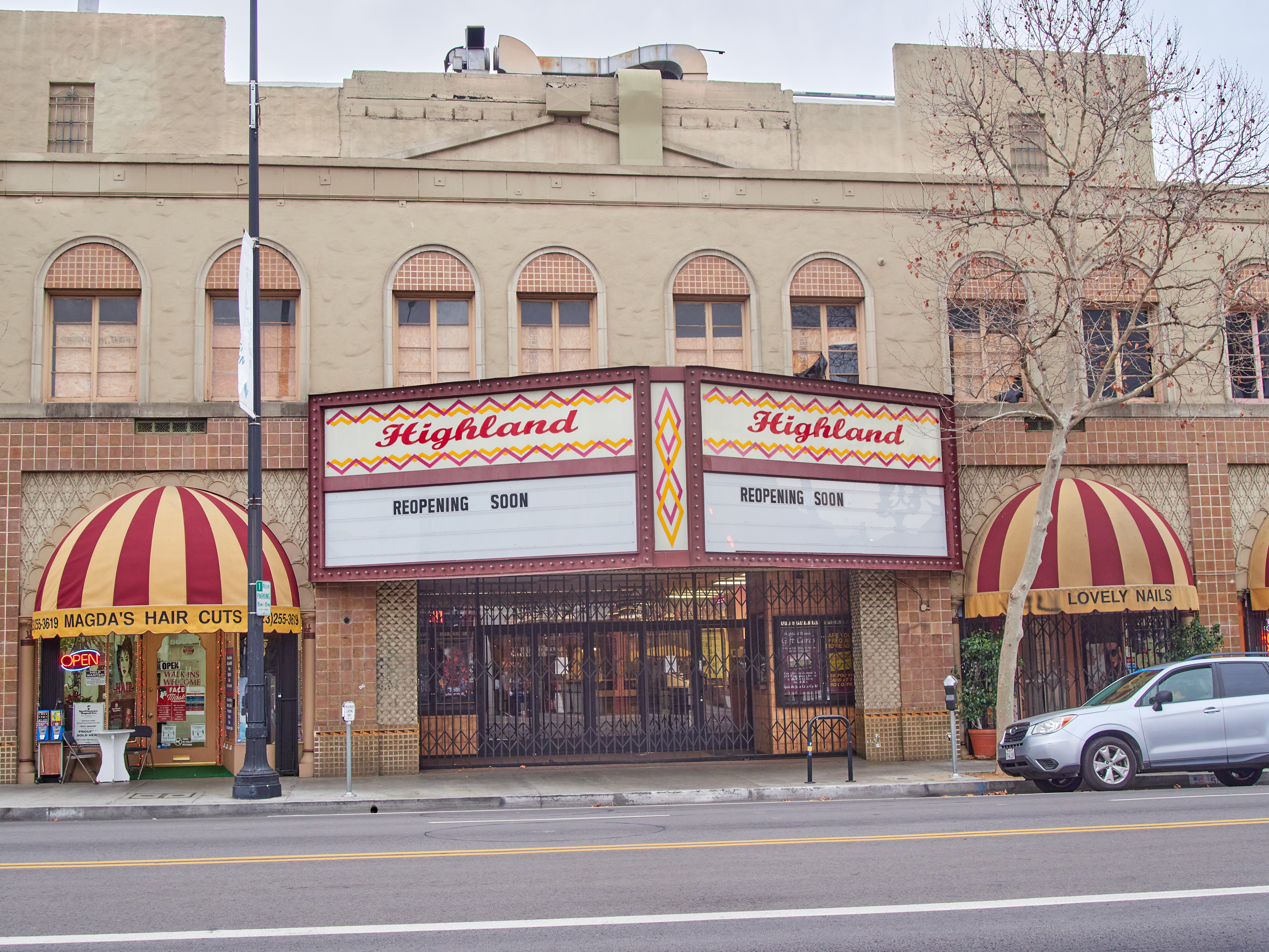
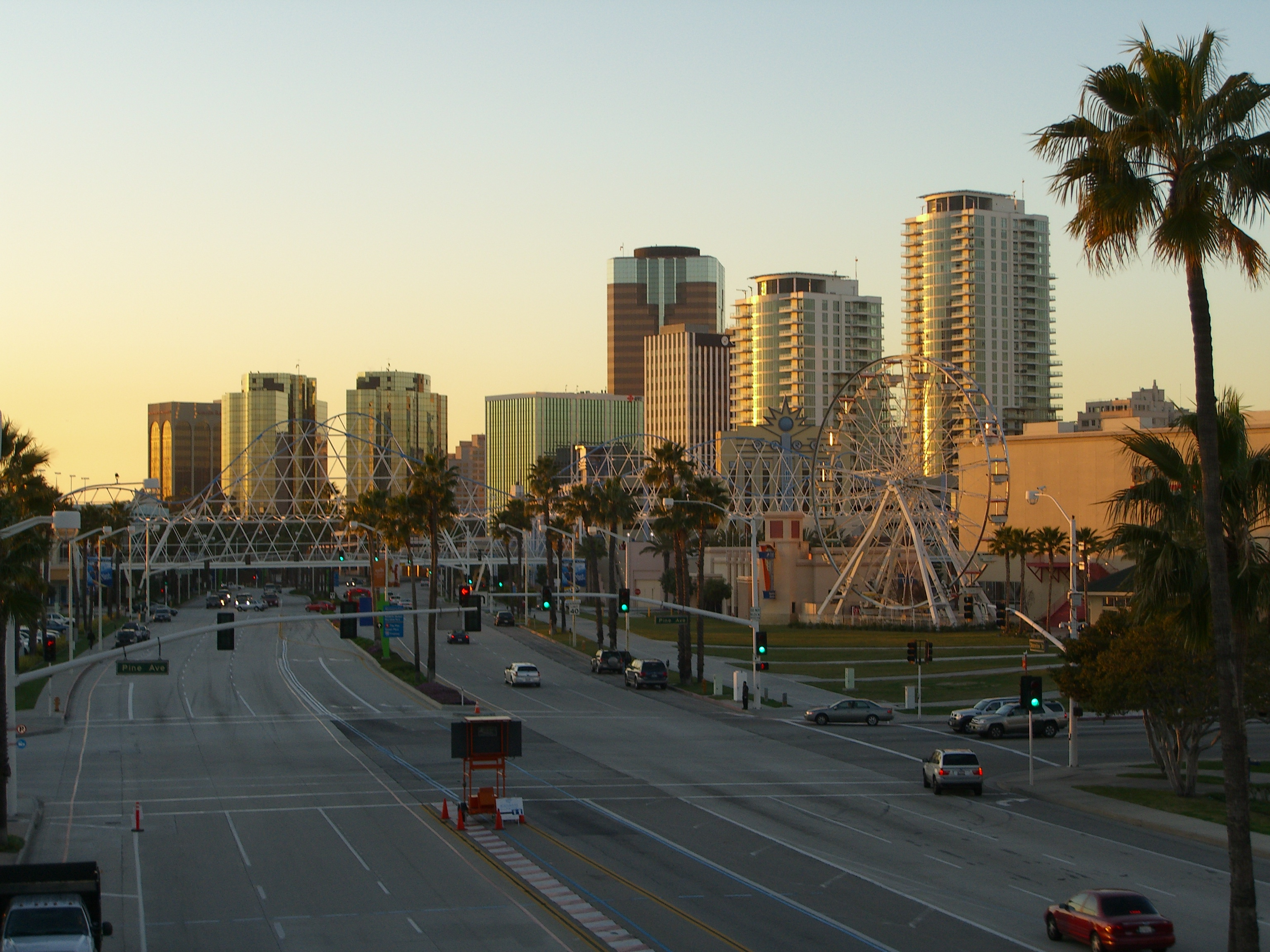
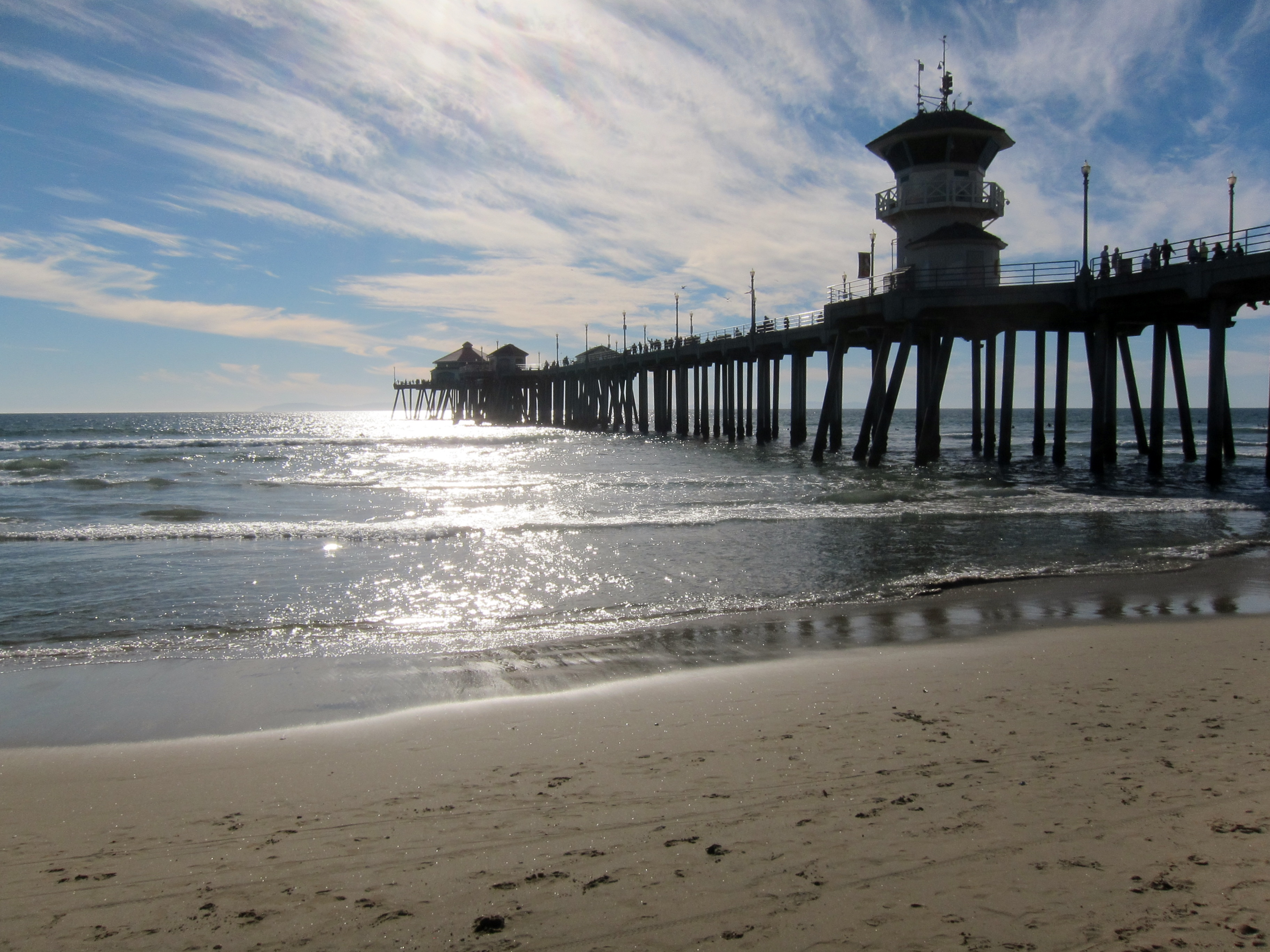
The Further Mis-Adventures of Cliff Booth was filmed in several locations in the Los Angeles area, including the Ventura County Fairgrounds in Ventura, California, the Highland Theatre in Highland Park, Los Angeles, Long Beach, California and Huntington Beach, California.

Principal photography began in late July 2025 in locations across southern California, centered primarily in the Greater Los Angeles area including Long Beach, Huntington Beach and the Ventura County Fairgrounds in Ventura, California. On July 29, 2025, Pitt was photographed filming scenes in Los Angeles at a location converted into a movie theater. In a report by the Ventura County Star in October 2025, filming at the Ventura County Fairgrounds took place on October 15, 2025, and included the depiction of a demolition derby competition at the Ventura Raceway. A permit obtained through a public records request from the California Film Commission listed the production under the working title UFP25 and stated that the shoot involved approximately 125 cast and crew members and 50 extras at the location. The scenes were later featured in the film's first teaser trailer, released in 2026. Set photographs showed a film slate bearing the name Discokingpin. The project has also appeared in production listings under Untitled Fincher Project 25 as well as Disco Kingpin.

Pitt was also spotted filming scenes with Fogelmanis and Karagulian in 2025. By early September of that year, 1970s-style storefronts were recreated around the Highland Theatre in the Los Angeles neighborhood of Highland Park under the direction of production designer Donald Graham Burt. A poster for the 1977 comedy Which Way Is Up?, starring Richard Pryor, was also visible among the recreated storefronts. The same month, scenes were seen being filmed on location in Huntington Beach and Long Beach.

Erik Messerschmidt, a longtime collaborator of Fincher's, served as the film's director of photography after previously working with him on Mindhunter (2017–19), Mank (2020) and The Killer (2023). Principal photography wrapped on January 15, 2026. According to The Playlist, additional photography and reshoots with Pitt were scheduled for August 2026. The outlet reported that several large sets were rebuilt for the pickups and that Jeff Cronenweth, another frequent Fincher collaborator who worked with him on Fight Club (1999), The Social Network (2010), The Girl with the Dragon Tattoo (2011) and Gone Girl (2014), replaced Messerschmidt for the additional photography due to the latter's commitment to The Batman: Part II (2028).

=== Post-production ===
Kirk Baxter edited the film. In August 2026, Netflix announced the film was titled The Further Mis-Adventures of Cliff Booth.

=== Music ===
Trent Reznor and Atticus Ross are composing the film's score, marking their sixth collaboration with director David Fincher.

== Release ==
The Further Mis-Adventures of Cliff Booth had its world premiere in Los Angeles on November 16, 2026. The film is scheduled to be released exclusively in IMAX on November 25, 2026, before its streaming debut by Netflix on December 23, 2026, taking over the release date of Narnia: The Magician's Nephew (2027).

In July 2026, Alberto Barbera, artistic director of the Venice International Film Festival, stated that the film would not premiere at the festival because director Fincher had paused work on the film for personal reasons. Barbera reported that the film was expected to be completed in October 2026, making it unavailable in time for the festival.

Sony Pictures chairman Tom Rothman cited that Tarantino originally planned to direct the film and theatrically release it as its predecessor, but its release plans changed once he decided to not direct it and pass the job to Fincher, who exclusively does projects for Netflix, leading Tarantino to take the project there, with Rothman and Sony unwilling to do anything to deter them despite their disappointment at the situation.

A novelization written by Tarantino, titled The Adventures of Cliff Booth, is set to be published by HarperCollins on December 8, 2026. Tarantino previously signed a two-book deal with HarperCollins in November 2020.

=== Marketing ===
On February 8, 2026, the first teaser trailer for the film aired during Super Bowl LX, marking the first public footage released from the film and confirmed the film's official title. It featured Brad Pitt reprising his role as Cliff Booth from Once Upon a Time in Hollywood, while introducing the film's 1970s setting and its continuation of the character's story. The approximately 60-second Super Bowl advertising segment, airing during the game's first quarter, featured music from Emerson, Lake & Palmer's 1979 cover of "Peter Gunn", with R-rated content censored through animated "scribbles" obscuring depictions of nudity, alcohol, cigarettes and firearms. Scenes of Booth driving a demolition derby car during a figure 8 dirt race, filmed at the Ventura Raceway, were also included, along with period details such as advertisements for the 1977 films Looking for Mr. Goodbar and Black Sunday on the Paramount lot and a brief shot of Lucy's El Adobe Cafe. The trailer was released as part of Netflix's promotional campaign for the film. In October 2026, Tarantino presented the first 17 minutes of the film during a Once Upon a Time in Hollywood screening at AFI Fest.

== Reception ==
On the review aggregator website Rotten Tomatoes, 84% of 77 critics' reviews are positive, with an average rating of 7.2/10. Metacritic, which uses a weighted average, assigned the film a score of 69 out of 100, based on 32 critics, indicating "generally favorable" reviews.

Peter Bradshaw of The Guardian gave the film 4/5 stars and said the film worked due to Pitt's performance which was "endlessly watchable and entertaining". Owen Gleiberman of Variety praised the film saying it "gives you a highly pleasurable, shaggy heat-of-the-moment buzz".

David Erlich of IndieWire gave the film a "B-" rating, finding it a disappointing collaboration between Tarantino and Fincher and writing: "Pleasant enough for a movie so dark, and strangely relaxed for a movie so deeply self-conflicted, The Further Mis-Adventures of Cliff Booth is ultimately a story — there's that word again — about someone changing with the times without letting the times change them in return." Brian Tallerico of RogerEbert.com gave the film 2 out of 4 stars, writing, "It's a misfire in several directions, none more so than the incongruity at its center: a writer who specializes in playful, quirky, unpredictable narratives pushing and pulling against one of the most precise filmmakers of all time."

The film was criticized on social media for using generative AI. On AI in general, Fincher has said, "I'm not a luddite. I don't fear the unknown."
