= Hanelle Culpepper =

American director

- Born: Birmingham, Alabama, U.S.
- Other names: Hanelle M. Culpepper, Hanelle Culpepper Meier
- Occupations: Director, producer
- Years active: 1993–present
- Spouse: Jeffrey Meier (m. 2000)
- Children: 2
- Website: hillview798.com

Hanelle M. Culpepper is an American television and film director, best known for her work in television directing episodes of 90210, Parenthood, Criminal Minds, Revenge, Grimm, and Star Trek: Discovery along with other series. Before working in television, Culpepper worked as a production assistant and directed and produced short films. She also directed the thriller feature films Within (2009), Deadly Sibling Rivalry (2011), Murder on the 13th Floor (2012) and Hunt for the Labyrinth Killer (2013).

Culpepper became the first woman director and the first African American director to launch a new Star Trek series in the franchise's history, directing the opening three episodes of Star Trek: Picard (2020). Culpepper directed and co-executive-produced the pilot of the series revival of Kung Fu (2021).

== Early life and education ==
Culpepper grew up in Alabama in a family that loved movies and television. At first, she wanted to be an actor, but her parents pointed out that she was always directing her siblings in plays she wrote and put on.

Her father worked as a lineman for a telephone company in Birmingham. He became one of the first African American executives at the company. Her mother was a homemaker who later worked in a bank and the city government.

Culpepper is a 1988 alumna of Indian Springs School, a private high school outside of Birmingham. In her senior year, she decided she wanted to be a director after directing her first play, a one-act comedy by George S. Kaufman, If Men Played Cards As Women Do.

She attended Lake Forest College, near Chicago, IL. She was active in theater and majored in economics and French, graduating summa cum laude and Phi Beta Kappa. She earned her M.A. from USC Annenberg School for Communication.

== Career ==
Culpepper is the director and co-executive producer of the pilot of Kung Fu (2021). The series is a reboot of the 1970s television show Kung Fu, which starred David Carradine. Olivia Liang stars in the reboot as a young Chinese American woman, Nicky Chen. Culpepper said that she is honoured to introduce "an authentic and honest portrayal of a Chinese American family".

On March 13, 2020, restrictions due to the COVID-19 pandemic temporarily shut down production of the Kung Fu pilot, as well as most film productions around the world. Because of this delay, The CW Television Network producing the new series pushed its launch to later in 2021.

Culpepper is listed among the alumni of AFI’s longtime directing workshop program called AFI DWW+ (originally the Directing Workshop for Women).

In January 2024, AFI announced that Culpepper would serve as Guest Artistic Director for the DWW+ Class of 2025 — meaning she will oversee the program’s artistic curriculum and mentor the new cohort of filmmakers.

== Awards and Nominations ==
Award	Year	Category	Nominated work	Result	Ref.
Primetime Emmy Awards	2026	Outstanding Directing in Drama Series	Paradise (episode: "Exodus")	Nominated	
NAACP Image Awards	2022	Outstanding Directing in a Drama Series	True Story (episode: "Like Cain Did Abel")	Nominated	
NAACP Image Awards	2021	Outstanding Directing in a Drama Series	Star Trek: Picard (episode: "Remembrance")	Won	
NAACP Image Awards	2015	Outstanding Directing in a Drama Series	Criminal Minds (episode: "The Edge of Winter")	Nominated	
The Astra Awards	2025	Best Directing in a Drama Series	Matlock (episode: "I Was That, Too")	Nominated	
Black Reel TV Awards	2026	Outstanding Directing in a Drama Series	Paradise (episode: "Exodus")	Won	
Black Reel TV Awards	2022	Outstanding Directing, TV Movie/Limited Series	The Last Days of Ptolemy Grey (episode: "Ptolemy")	Nominated	

=== Other Accolades ===
- 2019 ReFrame Rise Director
- 2019 Variety Inclusion Impact Honors
- 2012 NBCUniversal Directing Initiative Fellow

== Personal life ==
Culpepper met her future husband, Jeffrey Meier, when she was interning at Sony while studying film for her M.A.

== Television ==
- 90210
- Parenthood
- Criminal Minds
- Revenge
- American Crime
- The Flash
- Hawaii Five-0
- Grimm
- Castle
- Stalker
- The Originals
- Sleepy Hollow
- Gotham
- Empire
- Mistresses
- American Gothic
- Quantico
- Rosewood
- Ten Days in the Valley
- How to Get Away with Murder
- Star Trek: Discovery
- Lucifer
- UnREAL
- Supergirl
- S.W.A.T.
- The Crossing
- Mayans M.C.
- Counterpart
- NOS4A2
- Star Trek: Picard (series premiere)
- Big Sky
- Kung Fu
- The Acolyte
- NCIS: Origins
- Matlock
