= Give Me Some Sugah =

- Release poster
- Directed by: Tasha Smith
- Written by: Randy Brown
- Produced by: DeVon Franklin; Tyler Perry
- Starring: Taraji P. Henson; Jo-Vaughn Virginie Scott; Tasha Smith; DeVon Franklin; Russell Hornsby; Aunjanue Ellis-Taylor
- Cinematography: Timothy A. Burton
- Edited by: David S. Clark
- Production companies: Franklin Entertainment; Tyler Perry Studios
- Distributed by: Netflix
- Release date: December 16, 2026
- Country: United States
- Language: English

Give Me Some Sugah is an upcoming American television film directed by Tasha Smith and written by Randy Brown. It is based on the true story of Chicago bakery owner Lenore Lindsey and produced by DeVon Franklin and Tyler Perry. It stars Taraji P. Henson, Jo-Vaughn Virginie Scott, Smith, Franklin, Russell Hornsby and Aunjanue Ellis-Taylor.

Give Me Some Sugah is set to release on Netflix on December 16, 2026.

== Cast ==
- Taraji P. Henson
- Jo-Vaughn Virginie Scott
- Tasha Smith
- DeVon Franklin
- Russell Hornsby
- Aunjanue Ellis-Taylor
- Alexis Louder
- Semaj Prather
- Arischa Conner
- Angela Davis
- Caroline Avery Granger
- Kai Ture

== Production ==
In October 2025, it was announced that Taraji P. Henson and Jo-Vaughn Virginie Scott will star in the faith-based film about Chicago bakery owner Lenore Lindsey produced by DeVon Franklin and Tyler Perry and directed by Tasha Smith. On December 5, 2025, it was announced that Aunjanue Ellis-Taylor, Russell Hornsby, Alexis Louder, Semaj Prather, Arischa Conner, Angela Davis, Caroline Avery Granger, as well Tasha Smith and Franklin have joined the cast.

Principal photography began in Atlanta, Georgia on November 17, 2025 to December 12, 2025 with additional footage captured on location in Chicago, Illinois.
