= JB Tadena =

American actor (born 1983 or 1984)

- Born: Los Angeles, California, U.S.
- Education: Penn State (BA)
- Occupation: Actor
- Years active: 2014–present

JB Tadena (1983 or 1984) is an American actor. He is best known for his performances in Kung Fu and The Cleaning Lady.

== Life and career ==
Tadena was raised in Virginia, the son of immigrants from the Philippines. He received his bachelor's degree from Penn State. After college he worked full-time as a satellite engineer in Washington, D.C., while acting at Studio Theatre in the evening. He decided to switch careers after his father, ill with cancer, encouraged him to pursue his dream of acting shortly before he died. Tadena moved to Los Angeles and booked his first professional acting role on Grey's Anatomy in 2014. He also acted in SEAL Team, Westworld, and NCIS.

His first recurring role was for the miniseries Naruto: Climbing Silver. His next recurring role was on the second season of The CW action-adventure series Kung Fu as Sebastian Cailao. He was promoted to main cast member for the show's third and final season. Tadena is the voice actor for the recurring character Lolo Ben on the animated series Firebuds. He was also a voice actor for Call of Duty: Vanguard and provided additional vocals for Raya and the Last Dragon (2021) alongside fellow Fil-Am actors Vincent Rodriguez III and Liza del Mundo.

In 2024, he joined the third season of The Cleaning Lady in a recurring role as Paolo Bazella. In 2025 he was cast in the David Fincher Netflix film The Further Mis-Adventures of Cliff Booth.
