= Lauren Glazier =

Canadian-American actress

- Born: Lauren Christie Glazier; Kelowna, British Columbia, Canada
- Occupation: Actress
- Known for: Mindhunter

Lauren Christie Glazier (born 1985) is a Canadian-American film and television actress.

== Early life and education ==
Glazier was born and grew up in Kelowna, British Columbia and studied at the Lee Strasberg Theatre and Film Institute and the Vancouver Academy of Dramatic Arts.

== Career ==
Glazier was discovered by Antoine Fuqua in Vancouver and has since appeared on stage in Six Degrees of Fornication with The Whitefire Theatre in 2009, as Isadora Duncan in the Los Angeles premiere of When She Danced in 2010; and in Something Blue with The Whitefire Theatre in 2011.

In TV and film, she appeared in the 2010 TV film Class, the 2009 film Going Back, and the 2010 film Killers, and played a Russian sniper in the 2018 film Red Sparrow. She had a lead role in the 2012 film South Down Orchard. Her breakthrough role was as a fashionista in the 2014 film Gone Girl.

In 2019, Glazier played a recurring character in Season 2 of Netflix’s crime drama Mindhunter.

She also plays Nyrie in the science fiction drama series See on Apple TV+, which premiered in November 2019.

== Filmography ==
Year	Title	Role	Other notes
2006	Still Dreams	—	Short film
2007	Coffee Diva	Bookworm	Short film
2007	Shooter	Student	Uncredited
2009	Hell's Snow	Maggie	Short film
2009	Fragments de Laura	Tilda	Short film
2010	Going Back	Lorna	Short film
2010	Killers	Stewardess	-
2010	Class	Jennifer Burch	Television film
2010	Man and Woman	Woman	Short film
2011	Reunion X	Vivian Taylor	Video short
2011	The Chicago 8	Anita Hoffman	-
2012	Man and Woman	Woman	-
2012	South Down Orchard	Arielle	-
2014	Gone Girl	Journalist	-
2014	Finding Harmony	Brittany	-
2018	Red Sparrow	Russian Sniper	-
2019	Mindhunter	Kay Manz	-
2019	See	Nyrie	-
2022	Tales of the Walking Dead	Brooke	-
2025	Ransom Canyon	Angie	
2026	The Further Mis-Adventures of Cliff Booth	TBA	

== Other works ==
Year	Title	directed by
2007	Redemption music video - Bleed Me Dry	Marcos Effron
2007	Mark Ronson music video - Stop Me	Matt Lenski
2007	Nico Vega music video - Be Giving	Bryan Sipe
2008	Machine music video - Raison D'Etre	Sylvia Sether
2009	Commercial: Born of Fire - Sherrilyn Kenyon	-
2011	Commercial: Nikon featuring Ashton Kutcher	Bennett Miller
2011	Commercial: American Express	Josh & Xander
2011	Commercial: Sonosite	Maurio Fiore
2011	Space Capone music video - 'I Just Wanna Dance''	-

== Model works ==
Year	Title	directed by
2010	Nico Vega album cover	Nico Vega
2011	Queen George clothing campaign	Jodi Lyn O'Keefe
