= Midville, Georgia =

- City
- Location in Burke County and the state of Georgia
- Coordinates: 32°49′17″N 82°14′12″W
- Country: United States
- State: Georgia
- County: Burke

Area
  - Total: 2.00 sq mi (5.17 km^{2})
  - Land: 1.99 sq mi (5.15 km^{2})
  - Water: 0.0077 sq mi (0.02 km^{2})
- Elevation: 194 ft (59 m)

Population (2020)
  - Total: 385
  - Density: 193/sq mi (74.7/km^{2})
- Time zone: UTC-5 (Eastern (EST))
  - Summer (DST): UTC-4 (EDT)
- ZIP code: 30441
- Area code: 478
- FIPS code: 13-51240
- GNIS feature ID: 0318099

Midville is a city in Burke County, Georgia, United States. The population was 269 at the 2010 census, and 385 in 2020. It is part of the Augusta, Georgia metropolitan area.

== History ==
The Georgia General Assembly incorporated Midville as a town in 1877. The community was so named on account of its central location between Macon and Savannah.

Murphree Cemetery contains the grave of John Murphree (1735–1798), who served with John Collier's regiment of North Carolina militia. His son, Mills, was interred beside him upon his death in 1815, aged 59. Benjamin Brack (1763–1827), another private, is buried in Brack Cemetery at the former Brack plantation near Midville.

== Geography ==
Midville is located in the southwest corner of Burke County at 32°49′17″N 82°14′12″W (32.821321, -82.236586). The southern border of the city is the Ogeechee River, which is also the county line.

According to the United States Census Bureau, the city has a total area of 2.0 square miles (5.2 km^{2}), of which 0.008 square miles (0.02 km^{2}), or 0.34%, is water.

== Demographics ==
Historical population
Census	Pop.	Note	%±
1880	152		—
1900	275		—
1910	603		119.3%
1920	985		63.3%
1930	853		−13.4%
1940	780		−8.6%
1950	682		−12.6%
1960	676		−0.9%
1970	665		−1.6%
1980	670		0.8%
1990	620		−7.5%
2000	457		−26.3%
2010	269		−41.1%
2020	385		43.1%
U.S. Decennial Census; 1850-1870 1880; 1890-1910 1920-1930; 1930-1940 1940-1950; 1960-1980 1980-2000

=== Racial and ethnic composition ===
Midville, Georgia – racial and ethnic composition Note: the US Census treats Hispanic/Latino as an ethnic category. This table excludes Latinos from the racial categories and assigns them to a separate category. Hispanics/Latinos may be of any race.
Race / ethnicity (NH = Non-Hispanic)	Pop 2000	Pop 2010	Pop 2020	% 2000	% 2010	% 2020
White alone (NH)	141	125	148	30.85%	46.47%	38.44%
Black or African American alone (NH)	305	134	222	66.74%	49.81%	57.66%
Native American or Alaska Native alone (NH)	0	0	0	0.00%	0.00%	0.00%
Asian alone (NH)	0	2	0	0.00%	0.74%	0.00%
Native Hawaiian or Pacific Islander alone (NH)	0	0	0	0.00%	0.00%	0.00%
Other race alone (NH)	0	0	0	0.00%	0.00%	0.00%
Mixed-race or multiracial (NH)	11	3	3	2.41%	1.12%	0.78%
Hispanic or Latino (any race)	0	5	12	0.00%	1.86%	3.12%
Total	457	269	385	100.00%	100.00%	100.00%

=== 2020 census ===
As of the 2010 United States census, there were 269 people living in the city. By the 2020 census, its population had grown to 385.

== Education ==
Midville is in the Burke County School District.

== Notable people ==
- David Durden, professional football player
- Pat Dye, former football coach at Auburn University
- Tedi Thurman, model and television personality, born in Midville
- William Pierce, serial killer who murdered nine people across three states between June 1970 and January 1971

== See also ==
- Central Savannah River Area
