= The Last Days of Ptolemy Grey =

2022 American limited TV series

- Promotional poster
- Genre: Drama
- Created by: Walter Mosley
- Based on: The Last Days of Ptolemy Grey by Walter Mosley
- Starring: Samuel L. Jackson; Dominique Fishback; Cynthia McWilliams; Damon Gupton; Marsha Stephanie Blake; Walton Goggins
- Composer: Craig DeLeon
- Country of origin: United States
- Original language: English
- No. of episodes: 6

Production
- Executive producers: Samuel L. Jackson; LaTanya Richardson Jackson; Eli Selden; David Levine; Ramin Bahrani; Diane Houslin; Walter Mosley
- Producer: Llewellyn Wells
- Cinematography: Shawn Peters; Hilda Mercado
- Editors: Leo Trombetta; Hye Mee Na
- Running time: 49–57 minutes
- Production company: Anonymous Content

Original release
- Network: Apple TV+
- Release: March 11 – April 8, 2022

The Last Days of Ptolemy Grey is an American drama miniseries created by Walter Mosley for Apple TV+. Based on the 2010 novel by Mosley, the series stars Samuel L. Jackson, Dominique Fishback, Cynthia McWilliams, Damon Gupton, and Marsha Stephanie Blake. It premiered on March 11, 2022, and concluded on April 8, 2022, consisting of six episodes.

The series received seven Black Reel Award nominations, winning four, including Outstanding Television Movie or Limited Series. It also received six NAACP Image Award nominations, while Jackson and Fishback were both nominated for Critics' Choice Awards for their performances.

== Premise ==
A lonely 91-year-old man with dementia is temporarily able to remember his past and uses the time to investigate the death of his nephew.

== Cast ==
=== Main ===
- Samuel L. Jackson as Ptolemy Grey
- Dominique Fishback as Robyn
- Cynthia Kaye McWilliams as Sensia
- Damon Gupton as Coydog
- Marsha Stephanie Blake as Niecie
- Walton Goggins as Dr. Rubin

=== Supporting ===
- Omar Benson Miller as Reggie Lloyd
- Maury Ginsberg as Moishe Abromovitz
- JoAnn Willette as Judge Alison McCarty
- Arischa Conner as Sonia Lavendrell
- Patrick R. Walker as Roger Dawes
- DeRon Horton as Hilly
- Percy Daggs IV as Young Ptolemy

== Episodes ==
No.	Title	Directed by	Teleplay by	Original release date
1	"Reggie"	Ramin Bahrani	Walter Mosley	March 11, 2022
Ptolemy Grey's memory is getting worse.
2	"Robyn"	Debbie Allen	Walter Mosley & Jerome Hairston	March 11, 2022
Kicked out by Niecie, Robyn moves in with Ptolemy and accompanies him to a doctor's appointment for an experimental treatment.
3	"Sensia"	Hanelle M. Culpepper	Walter Mosley & Jerome Hairston	March 18, 2022
Ptolemy begins treatment to restore his memories, drifting in and out of fever dreams about his life as Robyn keeps vigil at his side.
4	"Coydog"	Guillermo Navarro	Walter Mosley	March 25, 2022
After unearthing a long-forgotten treasure, Ptolemy makes a plan. Later, he meets with a friend of Reggie's and learns revelatory details.
5	"Nina"	Guillermo Navarro	Walter Mosley	April 1, 2022
Ptolemy looks to his longtime friend and lawyer to help protect Robyn. A family gathering in Reggie's honor brings both healing and confrontation.
6	"Ptolemy"	Hanelle M. Culpepper	Walter Mosley	April 8, 2022
Ptolemy must settle all scores and make peace with his past-before he loses his memories once and for all.

== Production ==
The series was announced in December 2020, with Samuel L. Jackson set to star in and executive produce the series with Walter Mosley adapting his own novel into the screenplay. Dominique Fishback was added to the cast in March 2021. Walton Goggins, Marsha Stephanie Blake, Damon Gupton, Cynthia Kaye McWilliams and Omar Benson Miller were added to the cast in April 2021, with production beginning that month. Episodes were directed by Ramin Bahrani, Debbie Allen, Hanelle Culpepper, and Guillermo Navarro. Filming concluded on June 26, 2021. Craig DeLeon is the composer for the limited series.

== Release ==
The limited series premiered on March 11, 2022 on Apple TV+.

== Reception ==
=== Critical response ===
The review aggregator website Rotten Tomatoes reported an 90% approval rating with an average rating of 7.1/10, based on 40 critic reviews. The website's critics consensus reads, "The Last Days of Ptolemy Grey loses some luster in its final stretch, but Samuel L. Jackson and Dominique Fishback's sterling performances make this an unmissable elegy." Metacritic, which uses a weighted average, assigned a score of 75 out of 100 based on 22 critics, indicating "generally favorable" reviews.

=== Accolades ===
Year	Award	Category	Recipient(s)	Result
2022	6th Black Reel Awards for Television	Outstanding Television Movie or Limited Series	Diane Houslin	Won
2022	6th Black Reel Awards for Television	Outstanding Actor, TV Movie or Limited Series	Samuel L. Jackson	Won
2022	6th Black Reel Awards for Television	Outstanding Supporting Actress, TV Movie or Limited Series	Dominique Fishback	Nominated
2022	6th Black Reel Awards for Television	Outstanding Directing, TV Movie or Limited Series	"Robyn"; Debbie Allen	Won
2022	6th Black Reel Awards for Television	Outstanding Directing, TV Movie or Limited Series	"Ptolemy"; Hanelle Culpepper	Nominated
2022	6th Black Reel Awards for Television	Outstanding Writing, TV Movie or Limited Series	"Robyn"; Walter Mosley, Jerome Hairston	Nominated
2022	6th Black Reel Awards for Television	Outstanding Writing, TV Movie or Limited Series	"Ptolemy"; Walter Mosley	Won
2022	2nd Hollywood Critics Association TV Awards	Best Actor in a Streaming Limited or Anthology Series or Movie	Samuel L. Jackson	Nominated
2022	37th Imagen Awards	Best Director – Television	Guillermo Navarro	Nominated
2023	28th Critics' Choice Awards	Best Actor in a Limited Series or Movie Made for Television	Samuel L. Jackson	Nominated
2023	28th Critics' Choice Awards	Best Supporting Actress in a Limited Series or Movie Made for Television	Dominique Fishback	Nominated
2023	54th NAACP Image Awards	Outstanding Television Movie, Mini-Series or Dramatic Special	The Last Days of Ptolemy Grey	Nominated
2023	54th NAACP Image Awards	Outstanding Actor in a Television Movie, Mini-Series or Dramatic Special	Samuel L. Jackson	Nominated
2023	54th NAACP Image Awards	Outstanding Supporting Actor in a Television Movie, Mini-Series or Dramatic Special	Omar Benson Miller	Nominated
2023	54th NAACP Image Awards	Outstanding Directing in a Drama Series	"Robyn"; Debbie Allen	Nominated
2023	54th NAACP Image Awards	Outstanding Directing in a Drama Series	"Sensia"; Hanelle Culpepper	Nominated
2023	54th NAACP Image Awards	Outstanding Make-up	Michele Lewis	Nominated
