= William Pierce (serial killer) =

American criminal and serial killer (1931–2020)

- Born: William Joseph Pierce Jr. October 11, 1931; Midville, Georgia, U.S.
- Died: May 31, 2020 (aged 88); Jackson, Georgia, U.S.
- Other name: "Junior"
- Conviction: Murder (9 counts)
- Penalty: Life imprisonment

Details
- Victims: 9+
- Span of crimes: 1970–1971
- Country: United States
- States: South Carolina; North Carolina; Georgia
- Date apprehended: March 8, 1971

William Joseph Pierce Jr. (October 11, 1931 – May 31, 2020) was an American serial killer who committed a series of at least nine murders in three states from June 1970 to January 1971. After his capture, he admitted his guilt, was convicted and sentenced to several terms of life imprisonment. In 1974, Pierce renounced his confession, but all of his subsequent appeals for a retrial were denied.

== Early life ==
William Pierce Jr. was born on October 11, 1931, in rural Midville, Georgia. As a result of the Great Depression, his family experienced great financial difficulties and William Jr. spent his childhood in hunger and poverty. His mother was an authoritarian parent who frequently argued with his father. After his parents' 1945 divorce, Pierce's mother began to beat him, causing intense emotional stress. In his school years, Pierce underwent an IQ test that determined he had an IQ of 70.

In 1948, he dropped out of school after the 9th grade and took a job as a road worker for the Department of Transport and Road Facilities. After a year he quit and enlisted in the Army. Three months after his enlistment his mother submitted a number of medical reports and certificates from doctors to the administration of the base on which Pierce was serving. He was subsequently discharged for health reasons, despite the dubious provenance of the documentation. After his discharge Junior returned home and worked at a local car rental service where he was characterized positively. However, because of his inadequate communication skills, he appeared stiff and awkward and was unpopular with the locals. In this period, he married and quickly divorced, moved to neighboring Swainsboro, and found work at a furniture factory followed by other low-skill jobs.

At some point in the late 1950s Pierce suffered a head injury in an industrial accident. He was diagnosed with a concussion, after which he began to exhibit deviant behavior towards others and showed signs of a personality disorder, characterized by a belief in his own uniqueness and superiority over others and an overestimation of his talents and achievements.

In early 1959 he was arrested for theft, convicted on July 27 and sentenced to five years' imprisonment. After serving 32 months, Pierce was paroled in late 1961. A few weeks after his release, he was arrested for robbery and arson of a store and in 1962 was sentenced to 20 years' imprisonment with a possibility of parole after 10 years. During his detention he showed signs of mental illness and, after an examination, a psychologist's report stated that he "may be dangerous to himself and others." Nonetheless, on account of his good behavior and lack of disciplinary action over the years, Pierce was granted parole and released in May 1970.

== Murders ==
In June 1970, Pierce surfaced in the city of North Augusta, South Carolina. On June 27, with the aim of robbery, he entered a home and came upon 18-year-old Ann Goodwin (a Winthrop University student), a babysitter looking after the neighbor's children for the evening. He sexually assaulted and shot her after a struggle (she later died at a local hospital). He stole a number of valuables from the home as well.

On December 18, thirteen-year-old Margaret 'Peg' Cuttino left her home in Sumter, South Carolina - at about one o'clock in the afternoon to have lunch with her sister at school. When she did not show up after 45 minutes, her parents, State Representative James Cuttino and his wife, reported her missing. Peg's body was found on December 30, 10 miles away from where she was last seen. During the forensic autopsy, it was determined that she had been beaten and suffocated to death.

On December 20, two days after Cuttino's disappearance, Pierce drove to a service station in Vidalia, Georgia, where he shot 59-year-old employee Joe Fletcher, stealing $78 from the cash register.

On January 12, 1971, he robbed a store in Soperton, and then, in order to get rid of any witnesses, Pierce shot 51-year-old Lacey Tigpen, the store's administrator.

On January 22, he abducted 32-year-old Helen Wilcox near a store in Hazlehurst. He took the woman to the woodlands outside the city, where he sexually assaulted and then shot Wilcox, burying her corpse in a shallow grave, where it remained undiscovered until Pierce led police to the grave after his arrest.

On January 28, Pierce committed another robbery at a store in Baxley, in which he killed the 60-year-old store owner Vivian Miles, and brutally beat her five-year-old granddaughter, who suffered a severe head injury, but managed to survive. While fleeing the crime scene, he was spotted by a truck driver named Joe Overstreet. Pierce attempted to kill Overstreet by firing at him twice at close range, and then fled. Overstreet was unharmed, and would later give police a description of his attacker.

== Capture and confessions ==
On the afternoon of March 8, 1971, Pierce was arrested soon after robbing a gas station in Baxley. He was taken to the police station, where he was interrogated for several hours, resulting in him confessing to the six murders, including that of Ann Goodwin (North Augusta, South Carolina) and Peg Cuttino.

In addition, he confessed to three other homicides: the abduction and strangulation of 17-year-old Kathy Jo Anderson, who went missing on December 22, 1970, from Columbia, South Carolina and was later discovered in a wooded area on February 17, 1971; the August 21, 1970, handgun slaying of 20-year-old Virginia Carol Mains in Gastonia, North Carolina; and finally, on August 10, 1970, while robbing a service station in Beaufort, South Carolina, he hacked to death the 60-year-old employee James L. Sires with an axe, before stealing $970 and fleeing.

== Legal proceedings ==
Pierce's trial began in September 1971. In addition to his confession, a number of items found in his apartment and in the passenger seat of Pierce's car, which were identified as belonging to the victims, were presented to the court as evidence that resulted in his conviction. The only witness, Joe Overstreet, also identified Pierce as the man who had robbed Miles' store and then killed her, on the basis of which he was convicted for Miles' killing and sentenced to life imprisonment.

In March 1972, he was transferred to the Jeff Davis County Circuit Court, where he stood trial on charges of killing Helen Wilcox. During the trial, Pierce renounced his testimony, claiming that the interrogators had forced him to falsely confess while he was intoxicated and that he had not been read his Miranda rights. Despite his claims, he was found guilty and received another life imprisonment term.

In early 1973, Pierce was extradited to South Carolina, where during that year, he appeared before the courts in various counties on charges of the other murders, being convicted each time and receiving new life imprisonment terms.

== Later developments ==
Following his convictions, Pierce retracted his confession. In 1974, his lawyers appealed for the abolition of their client's murder convictions in South Carolina, and the appointment for a new trial, but they were rejected. In 1977, his lawyers attempted to appeal his sentences in Georgia, but again, they were rejected.

In April 1977, another serial killer, Donald Henry Gaskins, also confessed to the murder of Peg Cuttino, but later retracted his statements, stating that he was pressured by investigators during interrogation. Based on Gaskins' testimony, in 1985, Pierce's attorneys appealed for the vacation of the murder conviction. Despite the fact that his attorneys provided the Court of Appeals with a number of witnesses and their testimonies, according to which Gaskins was working in Sumter on the day the girl disappeared and was not far from where she had disappeared, while Pierce was in Georgia at the time, the appeal was rejected.

== Death ==
Pierce died at Georgia Diagnostic and Classification State Prison in Jackson, Georgia in May 2020.

== In popular culture ==
In 2019, Pierce appeared in the second season of the Netflix series Mindhunter, in which he was portrayed by Michael Filipowich.

== See also ==
- Donald Henry Gaskins
- List of serial killers in the United States
