= Scooby-Doo, Where Are You Now! =

2021 TV special

- Release poster
- Based on: Characters by Hanna-Barbera; Characters by DC
- Written by: Jonathan Stern
- Directed by: Jonathan Stern
- Presented by: Janel Parrish
- Music by: David Newman
- Opening theme: "Magic" by Just For Laughs
- Composers: Matt Novack; Greg Martin Ted Nichols
- Country of origin: United States
- Original language: English

Production
- Executive producer: Jonathan Stern
- Producers: David Soldinger; Franny Baldwin
- Production location: Burbank, California
- Editor: Jamie Conklin
- Running time: 39 minutes
- Production companies: Warner Horizon Television; Abominable Pictures; Adrian Court Productions Inc.; Warner Bros. Animation

Original release
- Network: The CW
- Release: October 29, 2021

Scooby-Doo, Where Are You Now! is a television special that premiered on October 29, 2021, on The CW. The special is a satire of "reunion specials", and features the Scooby-Doo characters, portrayed as actors playing fictional versions of themselves, reuniting at a Warner Bros. sound stage before getting caught up in a real mystery. This was also the last animated project to air on The CW right before the acquisition by Nexstar Media Group in August 2022.

== Voice cast ==
- Janel Parrish as Host
- Frank Welker as Fred Jones, Scooby-Doo, and Himself
- Grey DeLisle as Daphne Blake and Herself
- Matthew Lillard as Norville "Shaggy" Rogers and Himself
- Kate Micucci as Velma Dinkley and Herself
- Karamo Brown as Costume Designer Carter
- Brendan Jennings as Arlo Davidsonman
- Vadym Krasnenko as The Snow Ghost
- Olivia Liang as Martial Arts Trainer
- Mary Lynn Rajskub as Producer Bryn
- Baron Vaughn as Bram Penobscot

=== Additional voices ===
- Lindsey Alena as Wendy Powers
- Diedrich Bader as Batman
- Dominic Catrambone as Marvin White, Speed Buggy

=== Special guest star ===
- Cheri Oteri as Lazlo The Mechanic

=== Guests ===
- Jerry Beck
- Tony Cervone
- Seth Green
- David Silverman
- Tom Sito
- Mitch Watson
- "Weird Al" Yankovic
- Joseph Barbera (archive footage)

== Production ==
The music is scored by David Newman, who had previously scored the theatrical films Scooby-Doo (2002) and Scooby-Doo 2: Monsters Unleashed (2004).
