= Arischa Conner =

American actress (born 1971)

- Born: October 18, 1971 (age 54); Kingstree, South Carolina, U.S.
- Other name: Arischa Frierson
- Occupation: Actress
- Years active: 2013–present

Arischa Conner (born October 18, 1971) is an American actor.

== Early life ==
Conner was born in Kingstree, South Carolina, and raised in Florence, South Carolina.

== Career ==
Arischa is best known for her recurring role as Leah Turner in the Hulu original series Dopesick. She also appeared in episodes of Swagger and The Last Days of Ptolemy Grey.

== Filmography ==
=== Film ===
Year	Title	Role	Notes
2013	Egest	Extra	Uncredited
2015	Senior Conundrum	Cafeteria Lady	
2016	The Bag Lady	Khloe	Also writer
2017	Careful What You Wish For	Patrice	
2018	What Matters	Mrs. Davis	
2018	Another Tango	Marsha	
2018	Lake House	Molly	
2022	Son-of-a Preacher Man	Florence "Flo" Jamison	
2022	Collateral Damage: The Ambassadors Ball	Aunt Kat	
2022	Greed and Loyalty	Barbara	
2023	The Christmas Ringer	Anne	
2026	Give Me Some Sugah		

=== Television ===
Year	Title	Role	Notes
2016–2018	Cycles	Aunt Willene	10 episodes
2018	Fatal Attraction	Tiffany's Mom	Episode: "An Unlikely Witness"
2020	We Got This	Police Officer	Episode: "Be Careful What You Wish For"
2020–2021	Learning the Hard Way	Mom	10 episodes
2021	Dopesick	Leah Turner	6 episodes
2021	Swagger	Apocalypse Anne	4 episodes
2022	The Last Days of Ptolemy Grey	Sonia Lavendrell	3 episodes
2022	All American	Safron Hosea	Episode: "Changes"
2022	Players	Simone Elmore	3 episodes
2022	Mike	Maya Angelou	Episode: "Jailbird"
2023	BMF	ESTHER	Episode: "GET EM HOME"
