= Mindhunter (TV series) =

2017 American crime thriller television series

- Genre: Crime drama; Psychological thriller
- Created by: Joe Penhall
- Based on: Mindhunter: Inside the FBI's Elite Serial Crime Unit by: John Douglas; Mark Olshaker
- Starring: Jonathan Groff; Holt McCallany; Anna Torv; Hannah Gross; Cotter Smith; Stacey Roca; Cameron Britton; Michael Cerveris; Joe Tuttle; Lauren Glazier; Albert Jones; Sierra McClain; June Carryl
- Music by: Jason Hill
- Country of origin: United States
- Original language: English
- No. of seasons: 2
- No. of episodes: 19

Production
- Executive producers: Beth Kono; Charlize Theron; Joe Penhall; Ceán Chaffin; Joshua Donen; David Fincher; Courtenay Miles
- Producers: Jim Davidson; Mark Winemaker; Liz Hannah
- Production location: Pennsylvania
- Cinematography: Christopher Probst; Erik Messerschmidt
- Editors: Kirk Baxter; Tyler Nelson; Byron Smith; Eric Zumbrunnen; Grant Surmi
- Running time: 34–73 minutes
- Production company: Denver and Delilah Productions

Original release
- Network: Netflix
- Release: October 13, 2017 – August 16, 2019

Mindhunter is an American psychological crime thriller television series created by Joe Penhall, based on the 1995 true-crime book Mindhunter: Inside the FBI's Elite Serial Crime Unit by John E. Douglas and Mark Olshaker. The series debuted in 2017 and ran for two seasons. Executive producers included Penhall, Charlize Theron, and David Fincher, with Fincher serving as the series' most frequent director and de facto showrunner, overseeing many of the scriptwriting and production processes. The series stars Jonathan Groff, Holt McCallany, and Anna Torv, and follows the founding of the Behavioral Science Unit in the Federal Bureau of Investigation (FBI) in the late 1970s and early 1980s, and the beginning of criminal profiling.

The first season of 10 episodes debuted worldwide on Netflix on October 13, 2017. The second season was released by Netflix on August 16, 2019. A potential third season was put on indefinite hold in 2020. In 2023, Fincher said the series was definitely over.

== Plot ==
Mindhunter revolves around FBI agents Holden Ford and Bill Tench, along with psychologist Wendy Carr, who operate the FBI's Behavioral Science Unit within the Training Division at the FBI Academy in Quantico, Virginia. Together they launch a research project to interview imprisoned serial killers to understand their psychology with the hope of applying this knowledge to solve ongoing cases.

The first season takes place from 1977 to 1980, in the early days of criminal psychology and criminal profiling at the FBI. Cameron Britton has a recurring role in this season as notorious serial killer Edmund Kemper, who is the first to assist Ford and Tench in understanding how a serial killer's mind works. Other notable serial killers featured in the first season include Montie Rissell played by Sam Strike, Jerry Brudos played by Happy Anderson, Richard Speck played by Jack Erdie, and Dennis Rader also known as BTK, played by Sonny Valicenti.

The second season takes place in 1980 and 1981, with Ford and Tench investigating the Atlanta murders of 1979 to 1981, which included at least 28 deaths, mostly children. This is based on the real case of Wayne Williams, who was charged and convicted for the murder of two adult men but was never tried for the killing of the children and adolescents, causing mass outrage and questions over Williams's guilt as the children's cases went cold. The second season also features other infamous murderers, such as David Berkowitz, also known as Son of Sam, played by Oliver Cooper, William Pierce played by Michael Filipowich, Elmer Wayne Henley played by Robert Aramayo, and Charles Manson played by Damon Herriman.

== Cast and characters ==
=== Main ===
- Jonathan Groff as Holden Ford, a special agent in the FBI's Behavioral Science Unit (BSU)
- Holt McCallany as Bill Tench, a special agent in the FBI's BSU
- Anna Torv as Wendy Carr, a psychology professor working towards tenure at Boston University who joins the BSU. She is a closeted lesbian.
- Hannah Gross as Debbie Mitford (season 1), Ford's girlfriend and a graduate student in sociology at the University of Virginia
- Cotter Smith as Robert Shepard (season 1; guest season 2), the assistant director at the FBI Academy overseeing the BSU
- Stacey Roca as Nancy Tench (season 2; recurring season 1), Bill's wife
- Joe Tuttle as Gregg Smith (season 2; recurring season 1), a special agent newly assigned to the BSU
- Michael Cerveris as Ted Gunn (season 2), Shepard's successor as overseer of the BSU
- Lauren Glazier as Kay Manz (season 2), a bartender and Carr's love interest
- Albert Jones as Jim Barney (season 2; guest season 1), an Atlanta FBI agent
- Sierra McClain as Tanya Clifton (season 2), a hotel worker who brings Holden's attention to the Atlanta child murders
- June Carryl as Camille Bell (season 2), a grieving mother of Yusef Bell, one of the Atlanta murder victims and the organizer of the Committee to Stop Children's Murders

=== Recurring ===
- Cameron Britton as Ed Kemper, a serial killer interviewed by Ford and Tench
- Alex Morf as Mark Ocasek, a police officer from Altoona, Pennsylvania
- Joseph Cross as Benjamin Barnwright, a murder suspect in Altoona
- Marc Kudisch as Roger Wade, a Fredericksburg elementary-school principal
- Michael Park as Peter Dean, an Office of Professional Responsibility (OPR) investigator
- George R. Sheffey as John Boylen, an OPR investigator
- Duke Lafoon as Gordon Chambers, an Adairsville detective
- Peter Murnik as Roy Carver, a Sacramento detective
- Happy Anderson as Jerry Brudos, a serial killer interviewed by Ford and Tench
- Sonny Valicenti as ADT serviceman / Dennis Rader (BTK)
- Zachary Scott Ross as Brian Tench, Bill and Nancy's adopted son
- Nate Corddry as Art Spencer (season 2), a detective investigating a murder near the Tench household
- Regi Davis as Maynard Jackson (season 2), mayor of Atlanta
- Gareth Williams as Redding (season 2), the chief of Atlanta police
- Drew Seltzer as Dale Harmon (season 2), Bill and Nancy's neighbor
- Dohn Norwood as Lee Brown (season 2), the Atlanta police commissioner
- Brent Sexton as Garland Periwinkle (season 2), a retired agent who assists the Georgia Bureau of Investigation
- Christopher Livingston as Wayne Williams (season 2)

=== Guests ===
- Lena Olin as Annaliese Stilman (season 1), Carr's former lover and head of the psychology department at Boston University
- Sam Strike as Montie Rissell (season 1), a serial killer interviewed by Ford and Tench
- Jack Erdie as Richard Speck (season 1), a mass murderer interviewed by Ford and Tench
- Oliver Cooper as David Berkowitz (season 2), the serial killer known as "Son of Sam"
- Robert Aramayo as Elmer Wayne Henley (season 2)
- Michael Filipowich as William "Junior" Pierce (season 2)
- Corey Allen as William Henry Hance (season 2)
- Damon Herriman as Charles Manson (season 2); Herriman previously portrayed Manson in the 2019 film Once Upon a Time in Hollywood.
- Christopher Backus as Tex Watson (season 2)
- Morgan Kelly as Paul Bateson (season 2)

== Development and production ==
The development of Mindhunter began in 2009 when Charlize Theron gave a nonfiction crime book titled Mindhunter: Inside the FBI's Elite Serial Crime Unit to David Fincher. In January 2010 the Mindhunter project was set up at Fox 21, which had optioned the book, along with premium cable channel HBO. Scott Buck was tapped to write the pilot. Fincher, who was mostly known as a director and producer in films, felt at that time that television was "completely foreign" until he worked on the political drama House of Cards, for which he co-produced and directed the first two episodes. When Fincher finally felt comfortable with television as a medium after doing House of Cards, Theron suggested playwright and screenwriter Joe Penhall as the project's writer, replacing Buck. In December 2015, Mindhunter was moved to streaming service Netflix, with Fox 21 dropping out of the project.

In February 2016, Netflix announced that the production of Mindhunter would be based in Pittsburgh, Pennsylvania. Filming began in May 2016, and open casting calls were held on April 16 and June 25, 2016. Episode 9 of season 1 was filmed in Moundsville, West Virginia, at the West Virginia State Penitentiary. The series was renewed for a second season before its premiere on Netflix.

The character of Holden Ford is loosely based on FBI agent John E. Douglas, on whose book, Mindhunter: Inside the FBI's Elite Serial Crime Unit, the show is based. The character of Bill Tench is based on pioneering FBI agent Robert K. Ressler. Wendy Carr is a fictional character based on psychiatric forensic nurse researcher Ann Wolbert Burgess, a prominent Boston College nursing professor who collaborated with the FBI agents in the Behavioral Science Unit and procured grants to conduct research on serial murderers, serial rapists, and child molesters. Her work is based on treating survivors of sexual trauma and abuse, and studying the thought process of violent offenders. The serial killer characters were modeled on the actual convicted criminals and their prison scene dialogues were taken from real interviews. Although not explicitly stated, it is implied that the ADT serviceman seen in several short vignettes throughout the first season is Dennis Rader, the BTK Killer. This is clarified in the second season.

The musical score was written by Jason Hill.

The second season was originally reported to consist of eight episodes; however, the season ultimately contained nine episodes. Shooting took place between April and December 2018. Directors for the second season were Fincher, Andrew Dominik, and Carl Franklin.

In November 2019, a potential third season was reported to have been put on indefinite hold until Fincher finished working on his next film, Mank. Fincher planned to make five seasons. In January 2020, Netflix announced that the cast had been released from their contracts and that the series was on indefinite hold, as Fincher was busy with other projects. A Netflix spokesperson stated, "He may revisit Mindhunter again in the future, but in the meantime felt it wasn't fair to the actors to hold them from seeking other work while he was exploring new work of his own." In October 2020, Fincher confirmed the series was done for now, and a Netflix spokesperson said that a third season may be possible "maybe in five years". The next month, some of the reasons to suspend the series were fleshed out – cost (Fincher stated, "It had a very passionate audience, but we never got the numbers that justified the cost."), production (the second season showrunner was fired and eight of the scripts were rewritten), management (co-producer Peter Mavromates said of Fincher, "Even when he wasn't directing an episode, he was overseeing it."), and exhaustion (Fincher said, "I certainly needed some time away"). In February 2023, Fincher confirmed that the series was officially over.

In 2025, Holt McCallany revealed that Fincher had been having "conversations" about potentially reviving the series with three two-hour movies. "I know there are writers that are working, but you know, David has to be happy with scripts."

== Episodes ==
| Season | Episodes | Originally released |
|---|---|---|
| 1 | 10 | October 13, 2017 |
| 2 | 9 | August 16, 2019 |

=== Season 1 (2017) ===
| No. overall | No. in season | Title | Directed by | Written by | Original release date |
|---|---|---|---|---|---|
| 1 | 1 | "Episode 1" | David Fincher | Joe Penhall | October 13, 2017 |
FBI special agent Holden Ford is leading a hostage negotiation in Braddock, Pennsylvania, in 1977. Although it ends with the assailant killing himself, Ford is told that his negotiation was successful since he saved the hostage's life. He is promoted to teaching and takes an interest in a class delving into the minds of killers, taught by Peter Rathman. Ford, who is single and living alone, meets a sociology graduate student named Debbie Mitford, who encourages him to pursue further education in criminal psychology. Ford is referred to Bill Tench, head of behavioral science at the FBI. Tench takes Ford on his teaching classes around the country, sharing FBI techniques with local law enforcement. In Fairfield, Iowa, local police take offense when Ford suggests that Charles Manson may be a victim of his environment. As Tench counsels Ford to simplify his method, the two are approached by a local detective, Frank McGraw, seeking help with a brutal rape and murder case.
| 2 | 2 | "Episode 2" | David Fincher | Joe Penhall | October 13, 2017 |
In Wichita, Kansas, an ADT serviceman named Dennis demands that a coworker hand over an empty cardboard core from a roll of electrical tape before he will give him a new one. Tench and Ford arrive in San Francisco, where Ford requests a conversation with Manson, imprisoned 30 miles away. Tench tells him gaining access to Manson is impossible, but local police suggest that Ford meet Edmund Kemper, "the co-ed killer". Tench has no interest in interviewing Kemper, so Ford goes alone, finding Kemper to be surprisingly intelligent and talkative. Ford convinces Tench to accompany him during his next interview with Kemper. Kemper describes his hatred of his mother and how he began torturing animals. Assistant Director Shepard is infuriated to learn about Ford and Tench's interviews with Kemper and relocates them to offices in the basement. Ford and Debbie Mitford are dating and she wants him to meet her mother, telling him that her mother judges her boyfriends by their relationship with their own mothers. An elderly woman in Sacramento, California, is attacked and her dog's throat is slashed.
| 3 | 3 | "Episode 3" | Asif Kapadia | Story by : Joe Penhall; Teleplay by : Joe Penhall and Ruby Rae Spiegel | October 13, 2017 |
The ADT serviceman stares at a house before getting in a van and driving away. Ford and Tench approach Dr. Wendy Carr, a social sciences professor in Boston, Massachusetts, for academic input on their study. Their attempt to meet Benjamin Franklin Miller is declined. There is another attack of an elderly woman in Sacramento. Her dog is killed in the same way, but she is murdered. After an interview with Kemper, Tench posits that the suspect is white, in his 30s, and has a relationship with his mother similar to Kemper's. The police investigate Dwight Taylor, a man in his 30s with an abusive mother. Taylor is interrogated and confesses to the murder. Ford recommends the removal of certain words from the FBI's list of deviant words. Carr arrives in Fredericksburg, Virginia, as a consultant for the FBI.
| 4 | 4 | "Episode 4" | Asif Kapadia | Story by : Joe Penhall; Teleplay by : Joe Penhall and Dominic Orlando | October 13, 2017 |
Ford and Tench interview Montie Rissell, a serial killer who murdered five women in Virginia. Rissell shows no remorse for his actions and considers himself a victim. His technique is less sophisticated and organized than Kemper's. He killed his first victim because she was a prostitute who did not resist his attempt to rape her, and killed other victims for "talking too much". After being bribed with Big Red soda, Rissell reveals a hatred for his mother similar to Kemper's. Tench and Ford are in a car accident. In Altoona, Pennsylvania, Tench and Ford join local police officer Mark Ocasek in investigating the murder of Beverly Jean Shaw, a 22-year-old babysitter. They initially focus on a former drifter and local welder, Alvin Moran, but Moran's alibi checks out. Tench reveals that he and his wife have an adopted six-year-old son named Brian who is nonverbal. Back in Fredericksburg, Ford invites Carr to a bar to meet Debbie. Carr secures $385,000 in grant money to fund their research.
| 5 | 5 | "Episode 5" | Tobias Lindholm | Jennifer Haley | October 13, 2017 |
In Altoona, the investigation into the murder of Beverly Jean continues. Ford, Tench, and Ocasek interview her fiancé, Benjamin "Benji" Barnwright. Benji begins crying profusely and Ford suspects that this reaction is not sincere. Benji's mother mentions Benji's brother-in-law, Frank Janderman. Tench and Ford discover Frank's violent past, but decide he does not have the pathology of a serial killer. After interviewing Frank, the police discover Benji's relationship with Beverly Jean was not as serious as Benji believed. Tench and Ford interrogate Benji. Along with Ocasek they interrogate Benji's sister Rose at her home, and they notice bruises on her arms. Ocasek warns Rose that if the FBI finds she had any involvement with the murder, she will lose her child. Rose later comes to the police station and admits that Frank was not home on the night of Beverly Jean's disappearance. She confesses that Frank called her to Benji's house, where she found Beverly Jean dead, and that she cleaned the scene while Benji and Frank disposed of the body. Ford questions Debbie's sexual history.
| 6 | 6 | "Episode 6" | Tobias Lindholm | Story by : Joe Penhall; Teleplay by : Joe Penhall and Tobias Lindholm | October 13, 2017 |
The ADT serviceman is seen practicing tying knots while his wife tends to their infant daughter. Shepard offers Carr a full-time consulting position at the FBI. In Altoona, Tench confronts Benji. Carr concludes that when Rose arrived she saw that Beverly Jean was alive and told Benji and Frank that they had to kill her. The police conclude that Benji, Rose, and Frank are all accomplices. They intend to seek full punishment for Benji and offer pleas to Rose and Frank. Ford and Tench disagree with this decision, believing that Frank is the most likely to kill again. Carr returns to Boston and asks her girlfriend, Annaliese Stilman, for her opinion on the FBI's job offer. Annaliese warns her about her career and warns that she will have to stay closeted, but Carr decides to accept the FBI's offer. In Fredericksburg, Debbie and Ford have dinner at Tench's home.
| 7 | 7 | "Episode 7" | Andrew Douglas | Story by : Joe Penhall; Teleplay by : Joe Penhall and Jennifer Haley | October 13, 2017 |
Tench and Ford travel to Oregon State Penitentiary in Salem, Oregon, to interview Jerry Brudos. Brudos admits to having a shoe fetish. Ford buys an extra-large pair of women's shoes for Brudos, which he uses to get Brudos talking. Carr begins feeding a stray cat in the laundry room of her new apartment building in Fredericksburg. Tench and Nancy talk about Brian's behavior at school. At their home, Brian's babysitter discovers a graphic and disturbing crime scene photo and tells the Tenches that she cannot continue babysitting for them.
| 8 | 8 | "Episode 8" | Andrew Douglas | Story by : Erin Levy; Teleplay by : Erin Levy and Jennifer Haley | October 13, 2017 |
Ford is invited to speak at an elementary school and is approached by a teacher, Janet Ebner, who is concerned with Principal Roger Wade's behavior of tickling children's feet and giving them nickels. Ford becomes suspicious that Debbie is cheating on him. The BSU hires Gregg Smith. Ford asks Smith to come with him to speak with Wade, whom he suspects of being a pedophile. Wade insists that tickling is a positive experience for the children and turns discipline enjoyable. Smith tells Shepard about this line of investigation, and Ford is advised to drop the issue. Ford returns to Oregon to meet with Brudos, who is more talkative. Debbie invites Ford to an event held by her graduate class, where he catches her in a compromising position with Patrick, her project partner. Ford angrily leaves. He later receives a call from the school superintendent informing him that Wade will be fired.
| 9 | 9 | "Episode 9" | David Fincher | Story by : Carly Wray; Teleplay by : Carly Wray and Jennifer Haley | October 13, 2017 |
The ADT serviceman sits in the house of an intended victim. When the clock strikes midnight and the victim shows no sign of arriving, he becomes fed up with waiting, tidies up after himself, and leaves, frustrated. At the Joliet Correctional Center in Joliet, Illinois, Ford and Tench interview Richard Speck, who shows no interest in cooperating until Ford asks what gave him the right to take "eight ripe cunts out of the world". Tench recommends that Ford redact his unconventional comment from the interview. Ford and Debbie reconcile. Ford is confronted by Wade's wife at his apartment. Carr notices that food she has been leaving for the cat is no longer being eaten. The unit releases information regarding the murder of Lisa Dawn Porter, a 12-year-old-girl in Adairsville, Georgia. Police notice that the trees on her street had recently been trimmed, and focus on Darrell Gene Devier, who did the work. Carr is summoned by Shepard, who informs her that Speck has filed a complaint accusing Ford of "fucking with his head". The unit gives the redacted interview transcript to the OPR. Back in the basement, the team agrees to destroy the original tape, but Gregg decides to mail it to the OPR in secret.
| 10 | 10 | "Episode 10" | David Fincher | Story by : Joe Penhall; Teleplay by : Joe Penhall and Jennifer Haley | October 13, 2017 |
Kemper writes repeatedly to Ford, saying he would like to meet with him again. Devier agrees to meet the FBI voluntarily. Ford uses techniques he learned from his interviews to achieve a confession. The police celebrate, and after having too many drinks, Ford brags about the unit's involvement with serial killers. His boasts reach the press. Carr flies to Rome, Georgia, in hopes of preventing the district attorney from seeking the death penalty for Devier and compromising their work by making their profiling techniques public. Ford and Debbie break up. Ford receives an urgent call from Kemper's doctor, learning he has been listed as Kemper's emergency contact and that Kemper has attempted suicide. The unit learns that the OPR has received the recording of the Speck interview, and interview Ford and Tench. Ford visits Kemper in the prison medical ward, and Kemper says he could kill Ford if he wanted to. When Kemper rises from his bed and puts his arms around Ford, Ford flees in terror before collapsing in the hall in a panic attack. In Kansas, the ADT serviceman is seen burning sadistic drawings of women.

=== Season 2 (2019) ===
| No. overall | No. in season | Title | Directed by | Written by | Original release date |
|---|---|---|---|---|---|
| 11 | 1 | "Episode 1" | David Fincher | Story by : Doug Jung and Joshua Donen & Courtenay Miles; Teleplay by : Courtenay Miles | August 16, 2019 |
The ADT serviceman's wife walks in on him performing autoerotic asphyxiation. Holden wakes up in the hospital and learns that he had a panic attack. Tench, who has been looking for him, retrieves him from the hospital. Shepard retires and his replacement, Ted Gunn, gives his full support to the BSU and does away with the OPR inquiry. Ford tells Carr about his panic attacks and says he feels much better, despite being told that he has a panic disorder. She advises him to be careful of the signs that may precede another attack. Shepard angrily reveals to Ford that he was forced to retire because someone had to take the blame for Ford's breaches of professional conduct. Ford suffers another panic attack on hearing this but nobody else sees it.
| 12 | 2 | "Episode 2" | David Fincher | Story by : Doug Jung and Joshua Donen & Courtenay Miles; Teleplay by : Courtenay Miles | August 16, 2019 |
The ADT serviceman's wife gives him a pamphlet about overcoming sexual deviance. Tench begins to look into the BTK killer and, with Ford's help, notices that he models his behavior on that of other killers, including David Berkowitz. Tench and a local policeman meet with BTK's only known surviving victim, who is traumatized. They interview Berkowitz, who admits to lying about hearing voices and demons, adding to their data on classifications of killers. Tench and Carr discuss Ford's panic attacks and agree to share information and look out for him. A body is discovered in a house that Nancy, Tench's wife, is showing as the realtor.
| 13 | 3 | "Episode 3" | David Fincher | Story by : Joshua Donen & Courtenay Miles; Teleplay by : Joshua Donen and Phillip Howze | August 16, 2019 |
While in Atlanta with Jim Barney to interview killers William "Junior" Pierce and William Henry Hance, Ford is approached by three mothers who ask him to investigate the seemingly related murders of their children. The body found in Nancy's realty house is revealed to have been that of a toddler, who was tied to a cross. Tench offers his assistance to the police detective. Carr strikes up a romantic relationship with Kay, a bartender.
| 14 | 4 | "Episode 4" | Andrew Dominik | Story by : Joshua Donen & Courtenay Miles; Teleplay by : Jason Johnson & Colin J. Louro and Joshua Donen | August 16, 2019 |
Ford's profile of the child murderer in Atlanta as a black serial killer would be politically costly to Atlanta authorities if publicized, and the FBI is removed from the investigation. Carr goes on a date with Kay and reveals that she broke up with her previous girlfriend, who had been her professor, feeling there was a power imbalance in their relationship. Carr and Smith interview Elmer Wayne Henley In the interview, Carr reveals that she is a lesbian, but Smith believes this to have been a ruse to get Henley to speak. The Tenches find out that their son Brian was involved in the murder of the toddler.
| 15 | 5 | "Episode 5" | Andrew Dominik | Story by : Pamela Cederquist; Teleplay by : Pamela Cederquist and Liz Hannah | August 16, 2019 |
Carr's relationship with Kay heats up. Ford and Tench consult Kemper briefly to get insights into the BTK case before interviewing Charles Manson. Manson denies responsibility for any murders. Tench becomes upset during the interview and ends it early. Ford goes alone to interview Tex Watson, one of Manson's followers, while Tench flies home on a late-night flight. Watson details how Manson influenced his behavior and then details his role in the Tate murders. Carr, Ford, and Tench attend a dinner party at Gunn's house. Tench tells Carr what is going on at home. Another body is found in Atlanta.
| 16 | 6 | "Episode 6" | Carl Franklin | Story by : Joshua Donen & Courtenay Miles; Teleplay by : Courtenay Miles | August 16, 2019 |
As the situation in Atlanta worsens, the FBI is again sent to investigate. With Ford and Tench in Atlanta, Carr and Smith go to New York to interview Paul Bateson. The Tenches are concerned that Brian is age-regressing in response to his role in the murder of the toddler.
| 17 | 7 | "Episode 7" | Carl Franklin | Story by : Joshua Donen & Courtenay Miles; Teleplay by : Liz Hannah | August 16, 2019 |
Ford and Tench hit a dead end with the investigation in Atlanta; they interview a plumber in vain. Ford suggests a new plan to lure the killer, a procession honoring the memory of the victims. Carr is disappointed when told by Gunn not to interview any more criminals and to focus instead on her analysis. She invites Kay to move in with her, but Kay is upset by the dispassionate way Carr asks her and does not accept.
| 18 | 8 | "Episode 8" | Carl Franklin | Story by : Joshua Donen & Courtenay Miles; Teleplay by : Alex Metcalf | August 16, 2019 |
Ford is persistent with his profiling to catch the Atlanta murderer and predicts that he will probably throw the victims in a river to avoid traces; Jim recommends that they watch the bridges in the area. An upset Tench attempts to reconnect with Brian, while Nancy shows strong signs of wanting to move. Carr overhears Kay having a conversation with her ex-husband in which she denies their relationship is important, and decides to leave her. In Atlanta, the FBI and the local police catch a potential suspect at a murder site.
| 19 | 9 | "Episode 9" | Carl Franklin | Story by : Joshua Donen & Courtenay Miles; Teleplay by : Shaun Grant | August 16, 2019 |
The police and FBI focus their investigation on Wayne Williams as the primary suspect of the Atlanta murders, but find it difficult to obtain physical evidence. Williams is later charged for two of the murders, but Ford doubts himself after APD decides to close all the child murder cases. Tench is stunned when he returns home to see that Nancy has moved out of the house with Brian. Ford watches a press conference concluding the Atlanta case, but continues to be troubled knowing that he could not solve the rest of the missing children's murders and bring closure for the families involved. The BTK Strangler is shown continuing to autoerotically asphyxiate, now surrounded by the drivers' licenses, photographs, and other trophies from his victims.

== Reception ==
=== Critical response ===
The first season received positive reviews from critics. On Metacritic, the season has a score of 79 out of 100 based on 25 critics, indicating "generally favorable reviews". On Rotten Tomatoes, it has an approval rating of 96% with an average score of 8 out of 10, based on 102 reviews. The site's critics consensus reads: "Mindhunter distinguishes itself in a crowded genre with ambitiously cinematic visuals and a meticulous attention to character development." The first season of Mindhunter was named among the best TV shows of 2017; it was ranked No. 10 on Metacritic's year-end list of the best TV shows of 2017 compiled from rankings by various critics and publications.

The second season was also acclaimed. On Metacritic, the season has an average score of 85 out of 100, based on 12 critics, indicating "universal acclaim". On Rotten Tomatoes, the second season holds an approval rating of 99% based on 70 reviews, with an average rating of 8.3 out of 10. The site's critical consensus reads: "Mindhunter expands its narrative horizons without losing sight of the details that made its first season so rich, crafting a chilling second season that is as unsettling as it is utterly absorbing."

=== Accolades ===
| Year | Award | Category | Nominee(s) | Result | Ref. |
|---|---|---|---|---|---|
| 2018 | Dorian Awards | TV Performance of the Year – Actor | Jonathan Groff | Nominated | |
| 2018 | Primetime Emmy Awards | Outstanding Guest Actor in a Drama Series | Cameron Britton | Nominated | |
| 2018 | Satellite Awards | Best Actor in a Drama / Genre Series | Jonathan Groff | Won | |
| 2018 | Satellite Awards | Best Drama Series | Mindhunter | Nominated | |
| 2018 | Saturn Awards | Best New Media Television Series | Mindhunter | Nominated | |
| 2018 | TCA Awards | Outstanding New Program | Mindhunter | Nominated | |
| 2018 | USC Scripter Awards | Best Adapted TV Screenplay | Joe Penhall, Jennifer Haley, John E. Douglas and Mark Olshaker (for "Episode 10") | Nominated | |
| 2020 | Primetime Emmy Awards | Outstanding Cinematography for a Single-Camera Series (One Hour) | Erik Messerschmidt (for "Episode 6") | Nominated | |
| 2020 | Satellite Awards | Best Actor in a Drama / Genre Series | Jonathan Groff | Nominated | |
| 2020 | Satellite Awards | Best Drama Series | Mindhunter | Nominated | |
| 2020 | Writers Guild of America Awards | Drama Series | Pamela Cederquist, Joshua Donen, Marcus Gardley, Shaun Grant, Liz Hannah, Phillip Howze, Jason Johnson, Doug Jung, Colin Louro, Alex Metcalf, Courtenay Miles, Dominic Orlando, Joe Penhall and Ruby Rae Spiegel | Nominated | |
