= Olivia Liang =

American actress (born 1993)

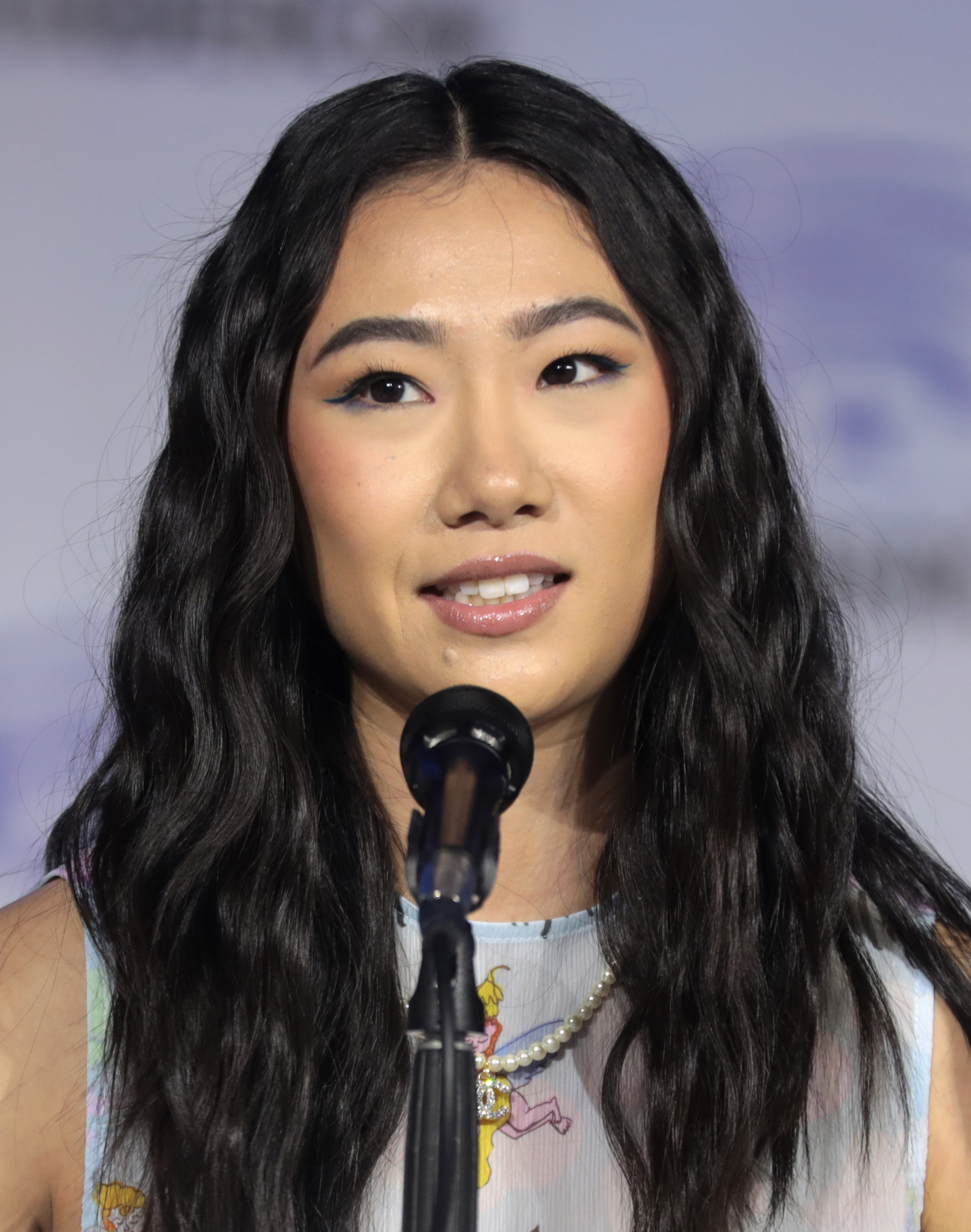
- Born: Olivia Faith Liang; May 11, 1993 (age 33); San Bernardino, California, U.S.
- Education: University of California, San Diego; University of California, Los Angeles
- Occupation: Actress
- Years active: 2016–present
- Known for: Kung Fu; Legacies

Olivia Faith Liang (born May 11, 1993) is an American actress. She is known for her roles as Alyssa Chang in the television series Legacies and Nicky Shen in Kung Fu. Liang has also appeared in television series including Grey's Anatomy, Into the Dark, and One Day at a Time.

== Life and career ==
Olivia Faith Liang was born on 11 May 1993, She grew up in Diamond Bar, California. Liang became interested in acting at a young age and also trained in dance. She studied ballet, jazz and hip-hop and later described dance as her first form of storytelling.

She attended the University of California, San Diego, where she studied communications. After graduating, she attended an acting program at the University of California, Los Angeles.

Liang began her television career with guest roles, including appearances in One Day at a Time and Grey's Anatomy. In 2017, she was selected for the ABC Discovers Talent Showcase. Thereafter, she appeared in Hulu's Into the Dark and The CW's Legacies.

In 2020, she was cast in The CW's Kung Fu. After more than 150 actresses auditioned for the role. At the time, she was appearing as Alyssa Chang on Legacies. Liang had not studied martial arts before being cast in Kung Fu. After being cast as Nicky Shen, she began training for the role. The series premiered in April 2021 and ran for three seasons, ending in 2023. In May 2021, Liang appeared on The Kelly Clarkson Show to promote Kung Fu.

In 2023, Liang joined the cast of Paper Flowers, an independent film directed by Karan Soni.

== Personal life ==
Liang has spoken about having anorexia as a teenager. She said that her experience with dance contributed to the pressure she felt about her body and appearance. She later discussed the experience in an interview with Women's Health.

== Filmography ==
=== Film ===
Year	Title	Role	Notes
2017	ABC Discovers: Los Angeles Talent Showcase	Herself	Short film
2017	The Best and the Loneliest Days	Vivian	Short film
2019	Handle with Care: A Holiday Story	Lisa	Short film
2023	ABG HEIST: Morning after gone wrong		Short film
2026	Reset	Riley	Short film

=== Television ===
Year	Title	Role	Notes
2017	Cereal	Ming	
2017	Pillow Talk	Jenna	
2018	One Day at a Time	Suehee	Episode: "Locked Down"
2018	Grey's Anatomy	Teacher Assistant	Episode: "Blowin' in the Wind"
2019	Dating After College	Wendy	Main role (7 episodes)
2020	Into the Dark	Yuejin	Episode: "Crawlers"
2020–2021	Legacies	Alyssa Chang	Recurring role (11 episodes)
2021	Scooby-Doo, Where Are You Now!	Herself	TV special; Shaggy's martial arts trainer
2021–2023	Kung Fu	Nicky Shen	Lead role (39 episodes)
2026	Paper Flowers	Fiona Chang	Lead role

== Awards and nominations ==
Year	Award	Category	Recipient(s) and nominee(s)	Result	Ref.
2022	Critics' Choice Super Awards	Best Actress in an Action Series, Limited Series or Made-for-TV Movie	Kung Fu	Nominated	
2023	Critics' Choice Super Awards	Best Actress in an Action Series, Limited Series or Made-for-TV Movie	Kung Fu	Nominated	
