= Kung Fu (2021 TV series) =

American martial arts action-adventure TV series

- Genre: Action-adventure; Drama
- Based on: Kung Fu by Ed Spielman
- Developed by: Christina M. Kim
- Starring: Olivia Liang; Kheng Hua Tan; Eddie Liu; Shannon Dang; Jon Prasida; Gavin Stenhouse; Vanessa Kai; Tony Chung; Tzi Ma; Yvonne Chapman; JB Tadena
- Music by: Sherri Chung
- Country of origin: United States
- Original language: English
- No. of seasons: 3
- No. of episodes: 39

Production
- Executive producers: David Madden; Martin Gero; Sarah Schechter; Christina M. Kim; Greg Berlanti; Robert Berens
- Producers: Karyn Smith-Forge; Jennifer Lence; Ian Smith; Kathryn Borel, Jr.; Lillian Yu; Carl Ogawa; Matt Young; Dan Hamamura; Richard Lowe
- Production location: Langley, British Columbia
- Cinematography: Neil Cervin; Lindsay George; Christopher Charles Kempinski; Geoff Wallace
- Editors: Tirsa Hackshaw; Mike Banas; Magnolia Rosso; Dexter Adriano; Amy Stuvland Parks; Robyn Muir; Hilary Bolger; Matt Lawrence; A.J. Calomay
- Camera setup: Single-camera
- Running time: 41–42 minutes
- Production companies: Berlanti Productions; Quinn's House (seasons 1–2); Kinga Productions (season 3); Warner Bros. Television

Original release
- Network: The CW
- Release: April 7, 2021 – March 8, 2023

Related
- Kung Fu (1972 TV series)

Kung Fu is an American martial arts action-adventure television series that premiered on The CW on April 7, 2021, and ended on March 8, 2023. Set in the present, it is an adaptation of the 1970s series of the same title. It is produced by Warner Bros. Television, as was the original series and Kung Fu: The Legend Continues. Executive producers include Christina M. Kim (developer of The CW series), Ed Spielman (creator of the original series), Greg Berlanti, Martin Gero, Robert Berens, and Sarah Schechter. It is one of a few American network dramas to feature a predominantly Asian American cast, including veteran actor Tzi Ma. The second season premiered on March 9, 2022, while the third season premiered on October 5 in the same year. In May 2023, the series was canceled after three seasons.

== Premise ==
Set in the present day, the series follows a young Chinese American woman whose personal issues force her to leave college and make a life-changing journey to an isolated monastery in China. On her return to America three years later, she starts using her martial arts skills and Shaolin values to protect her community when her hometown of San Francisco is plagued by ongoing crime and corruption, especially those being threatened by the Triad, all while dealing with her estranged family and searching for the assassin who killed her Shaolin mentor and is now targeting her.

This version is a re-imagining, rather than a reboot, of the 1972 television series starring David Carradine as Kwai Chang Caine, the fugitive monk traveling the American Old West.

== Cast ==
=== Main ===
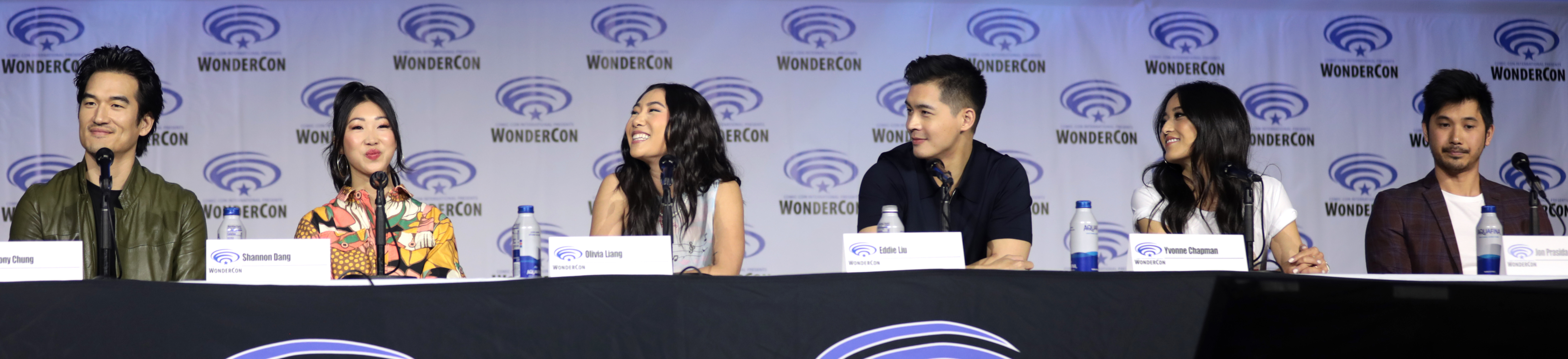
From left to right: Tony Chung, Shannon Dang, Olivia Liang, Eddie Liu, Yvonne Chapman, and Jon Prasida at WonderCon 2022
- Olivia Liang as Nicky Shen, a Harvard dropout and an outsider to her family who is an expert in martial arts, which she uses to stop a growing criminal problem that has overtaken her community. She acts as a vigilante for those who need help while discovering her potential and unlocking her destiny, as well as trying to reconnect with everyone around her. It was later revealed that she is a descendant of Liang Daiyu.
- Kheng Hua Tan as Mei-Li Shen, Nicky's strict mother, who helped her husband in the restaurant business and is not happy with Nicky for abandoning the family and was the reason for Nicky and Evan's breakup. She is keeping secrets that could threaten the family and was unaware of Nicky's mission to help others until she told Nicky the truth about being a descendant of Liang Daiyu.
- Eddie Liu as Henry Yan, a martial arts practitioner, expert on traditional Chinese art and mythology, and Nicky's love interest. He has a criminal past that he has regretted but has vowed to go straight while helping Nicky.
- Shannon Dang as Althea Shen-Soong (née Shen), Nicky's larger-than-life older tech-savvy sister who is newly engaged with plans of having the perfect life, despite dealing with a painful past involving sexual abuse by her former employer. An expert in cyber-hacking, she assists Nicky in her mission to stop the criminal elements.
- Jon Prasida as Ryan Shen, Nicky's estranged younger brother who is a quick-witted medical student, runs a free community clinic, and is openly gay, as they try to repair their relationship while assisting her
- Gavin Stenhouse as Evan Hartley, a highly successful assistant district attorney who still has feelings for Nicky, despite having a new girlfriend and Mei-Li's disapproval of him dating Nicky in the past. He acts as a go-to for Nicky while watching out for her, especially with knowing about Henry's criminal past.
- Vanessa Kai as Pei-Ling Zhang, Nicky's shifu (mentor) at the Shaolin Monastery in Yunnan Province, China. She was killed by her sister Zhilan while trying to defend the monastery from her gang of raiders and appears as a ghost to help guide Nicky. It was later revealed that she accidentally killed her own father and Zhilan blamed her.
  - Kai also portrays Xiao / The Alchemist, the creator of the warrior and guardian bloodlines who aimed to create a more powerful human. Jennifer Khoe portrays Xiao's true form in the third season.
- Tony Chung as Dennis Soong, Althea's husband and a wealthy investor from a rich family
- Tzi Ma as Jin Shen, Nicky's father, a restaurant owner who is upset over his daughter's choices despite his love for her, while at the same time keeping secrets that could destroy their family due to the Triad's grip on the local community, as well as concerns over his health problems. He was initially unaware of Nicky's actions and her family lineage to Liang Daiyu, finding out shortly after Nicky.
- Yvonne Chapman as Zhilan Zhang (season 2–3; recurring season 1), Pei-Ling's sister with deep criminal ties and a mysterious connection to the Shaolin monastery where Nicky trained. She seeks to collect 8 sacred weapons (The Sword of Liang Daiyu, a pair of Shuang Gou, a dagger, an axe, a pair of crescent moon knives, another sword, a crossbow, and a Meteor Hammer) and unlock their powers, unaware that Nicky came into contact with the Sword of Liang Daiyu that revealed her untapped destiny (she is unaware of Nicky being a direct descendant of Liang Daiyu). After killing Pei-Ling, Nicky's mentor, she becomes her archenemy.
- JB Tadena as Sebastian Cailao (season 3; recurring season 2), Harmony Dumplings' new chef and Ryan's love interest

=== Recurring ===
- Bradley Gibson as Joe Harper (season 1), a Bay Area LGBTQ/social activist and Ryan's former romantic interest
- Ludi Lin as Kerwin Tan (season 1–2), a vengeful playboy and heir to a family fortune who has personal history and aids Zhilan in gathering the eight weapons
  - Lin also plays the part of Russell Tan after he has his soul transferred into Kerwin's body.
- Janet Kidder as District Attorney Hughes, Evan's boss
- Kee Chan as Russell Tan, Kerwin and Juliette's father
- Marissa Cuevas as Nadia, Evan's secretary who helps him assist Nicky
- Vanessa Yao as Mia Yang (season 2–3), the Shen siblings' cousin and their Aunt Mei-Xue's daughter
- Fiona Fu as Po Po ( season 2), the grandma of the Shen family
- Annie Q. as Juliette Tan (season 2), Russell Tan's ruthless daughter
- Andrew Tinpo Lee as Frank (season 2), Jin's friend who helps in the community
- Terry Chen as Daniel Yan (season 2), Henry's estranged father
- Ben Levin as Bo (season 3)
- Kim Rhodes as Carrie (season 3)
- Donald Heng as Anthony Chan (season 3)

== Episodes ==
=== Series overview ===
Season	Episodes	Originally released	
Season	Episodes	First released	Last released
1	13	April 7, 2021	July 21, 2021
2	13	March 9, 2022	June 15, 2022
3	13	October 5, 2022	March 8, 2023

=== Season 1 (2021) ===
Kung Fu season 1 episodes
No. overall	No. in season	Title	Directed by	Written by	Original release date	Prod. code	U.S. viewers (millions)
1	1	"Pilot"	Hanelle M. Culpepper	Christina M. Kim	April 7, 2021	T13.22851	1.40
Fleeing from her overbearing family and seeking freedom, Nicky Shen joins an all-female Shaolin monastery in China and spends three years becoming an expert fighter under the tutelage of Pei-Ling. When her mentor is murdered by the renegade warrior Zhilan (who also steals a sacred sword) and the monastery is destroyed, Nicky returns to San Francisco, where everyone except her estranged mother Mei-Li and younger brother Ryan welcomes her back. After Nicky's father is hospitalized due to a beating, she learns that her family is indebted to Tony Kang, the local Triad boss. Nicky, Ryan, and their sister Althea gather information on the Triad for the police. However, when Ryan puts himself in danger to get photos of Kang's dealings, Nicky steps in and subdues Kang using a Shaolin technique before escaping as the police arrive. Her new friend Henry warns her that the stolen sword is one of eight mystical weapons. Zhilan likely plans to collect them all and unlock their true power. The scar that seared Nicky's hand (leaving a detailed inscription) during their first encounter is key to the search.
2	2	"Silence"	Hanelle M. Culpepper	Christina M. Kim & Robert Berens	April 14, 2021	T13.22852	1.37
Nicky agrees to help Althea with her wedding, restarts a game with her father, and promises to start training with Henry. After being saved by Nicky from attacker at a park, a homeless young woman named Rhonda (Amanda Fix) runs away. Nicky tracks her down and learns that Rhonda was thrown out by her sick mother's abusive boyfriend Derek, who is stealing from her to feed his gambling addiction. Nicky chases him off and gets a restraining order filed on Rhonda's behalf. Hours later, Rhonda discovers that Derek has emptied her mother's bank accounts and plans to gamble it all away at a private casino. Nicky tracks Derek down, makes him swear to never bother them again, and forces the casino to repay all the money he lost. Evan tells Nicky that Zhilan was recently spotted in Singapore, and learns that she and Pei-Ling are sisters. A pendant Nicky saw in a dream is tied to the missing swords, and a professor in Singapore can help her. Zhilan approaches him with a proposition.
3	3	"Patience"	Joe Menendez	Richard Lowe	April 21, 2021	T13.22853	1.07
At Ryan's clinic, Nicky befriends a woman named Faye who is trying to organize a union at the King Kwong garment factory. Faye suffers from poor health, but cannot stop working as the company does not cover sick days. She is later hospitalized, having been poisoned with industrial chemicals. Nicky gets Althea to help her access the company's storefront and investigate. She discovers the company's COO tried to kill Faye and exposes him; he is arrested and the company agrees to pay Faye's medical bills and recognize the union. Zhilan questions the professor and manipulates him into revealing all he knows. She then murders him and recovers a set of hooked blades from a Middle Eastern collector. Henry recovers a puzzle box from the professor's office which Nicky opens, finding a key hidden inside. Evan obtains a surveillance tape showing Henry and Nicky breaking into the office. Ryan introduces Nicky to his boyfriend Joe at a bar.
4	4	"Hand"	America Young	Kathryn Borel, Jr.	April 28, 2021	T13.22854	1.05
Henry and Nicky locate the puzzle box, only to have it stolen by Razor, a professional thief hired by Zhilan. Evan warns Nicky of Henry's criminal past; she initially brushes his concerns off, but then sees Henry trade a Qing artifact for information. This creates tension between them. Jin and Mei-Li have dinner with Althea's fiancee Dennis and his family, who want Althea to sign a prenup. This provokes an argument, and Althea storms off while Dennis sets his parents straight. At an art gallery, Ryan admits to Joe that he is his first serious boyfriend. Nicky appeals to Razor's ego by challenging him to a fight for the box; she wins and opens it, finding a scabbard for the Sword of Liang Diayu. Razor later sends the empty box and key to Zhilan. Dennis and Althea reconcile and his parents agree to drop the prenup. Nicky entrusts Henry with the scabbard and kisses him, saying that his past does not matter to her. Althea later reveals to Nicky what happened to the former while the latter was not in San Francisco. Althea was sexually abused and does not have the will to expose her abuser.
5	5	"Sanctuary"	R.T. Thorne	A.C. Allen	May 5, 2021	T13.22855	0.96
Nicky discovers the mystical weapons glow green in light. Elsewhere, Dennis tells Althea about securing tickets for them to take a boat tour of the Galapagos islands. One night, skateboarder Andre Durant is shot by police, who mistook him for a robber. Andre eventually dies. A protest to push for the killer to face charges takes place in Chinatown. The police shut down the protest using teargas. As the protesters scatter, Nicky shelters a handful in the restaurant, including Ryan and Joe. The police plan to come into the restaurant and arrest Joe, who is being falsely accused of inciting a riot. Ryan and Althea reach out to other protesters for evidence that Joe is innocent. When the police arrive, Nicky asks them to arrest her instead, buying time for Ryan and Althea. Ryan also asks for the police to arrest him, then everyone else in the restaurant. Just then, Althea finds a video showing Joe saying that the protest will be peaceful, proving his innocence. The police stand down and exit. Late that night, the Shen family reveals that they hid acts of racism against them from Nicky and Althea when they were kids.
6	6	"Rage"	Joe Menendez	Lillian Yu	May 12, 2021	T13.22856	0.96
Nicky and Henry learn that the next weapon is coming to the Reed Museum in San Francisco. However, Henry's contact, Randall, has no intention of helping them secure it. So Nicky devises a plan to steal the dagger at the Reed gala. At first, it appears that Henry does not want to be involved, but knowing Nicky will need more help, Henry asks Althea, Ryan, and Dennis to assist. At the gala, Nicky manages to steal the dagger, but Zhilan is also there. Zhilan threatens to kill Nicky's parents if she does not give up the dagger. Nicky reluctantly relinquishes it and later attempts to fight Zhilan, but loses the match. Zhilan reveals that Pei-Ling (her sister) killed their father. Meanwhile, Althea signs a nondisclosure agreement for five-hundred thousand dollars to keep quiet about the sexual assault inflicted by her old boss. Althea does not want to sign at first, but changes her mind, and asks that the money be given to the Chinese Community Center, specifically to keep the medical program where Ryan works funded.
7	7	"Guidance"	Michael Goi	Ryan Johnson & Peter Lalayanis	May 26, 2021	T13.22857	0.82
Evan brings an injured Nicky to his place to recover. While there, she decides to give up upon learning the truth about Pei-Ling. Ryan tells Nicky to rest, but she does not heed that request when Henry tells her about a friend whose sister has become an unwilling disciple of a violent martial arts instructor. With the help of Althea, Ryan, Evan and Henry, Nicky infiltrates the studio to challenge the instructor. They come up with a plan to expose his illegal activities. Nicky and the instructor fight. This is spurred on by Pei-Ling's spirit, leading to Nicky defeating him and to his arrest by Evan. Later, Mei-Li reveals the truth to Nicky: she is a descendant of Liang Daiyu and is chosen to be the successor. Mei-Li tried to steer Nicky away from fulfilling that destiny out of fear others would find out. Pei-Ling killed her father by accident, and this led up to the falling out with her sister. Zhilan confronts her uncle about the weapons.
8	8	"Destiny"	Dan Liu	Melissa Rundle	June 2, 2021	T13.22858	0.82
9	9	"Isolation"	Geoffrey Wing Shotz	Dan Hamamura	June 23, 2021	T13.22859	0.84
10	10	"Choice"	Richard Speight, Jr.	Linda Ge & John Bring	June 30, 2021	T13.22860	0.80
11	11	"Attachment"	Viet Nguyen	Michael Deigh & Richard Lowe	July 7, 2021	T13.22861	0.82
12	12	"Sacrifice"	Sudz Sutherland	Ryan Johnson & Peter Lalayanis	July 14, 2021	T13.22862	0.76
13	13	"Transformation"	Joe Menendez	Christina M. Kim & Robert Berens	July 21, 2021	T13.22863	0.83

=== Season 2 (2022) ===
Kung Fu season 2 episodes
No. overall	No. in season	Title	Directed by	Written by	Original release date	Prod. code	U.S. viewers (millions)
14	1	"Year of the Tiger: Part 1"	Joe Menendez	Christina M. Kim & Robert Berens	March 9, 2022	T13.23351	0.63
15	2	"Year of the Tiger: Part 2"	Joe Menendez	Ryan Johnson & Peter Lalayanis	March 16, 2022	T13.23352	0.47
16	3	"The Bell"	Winnifred Jong	Brian Anthony	March 23, 2022	T13.23353	0.65
17	4	"Clementine"	Richard Speight, Jr.	Richard Lowe	March 30, 2022	T13.23354	0.57
18	5	"Reunion"	David Grossman	A.C. Allen	April 6, 2022	T13.23355	0.43
19	6	"Jyu Sa"	Kristin Windell	Matt Young	April 13, 2022	T13.23356	0.48
20	7	"The Alchemist"	Richard Speight, Jr.	John Bring	April 27, 2022	T13.23357	0.58
21	8	"Disclosure"	Joe Menendez	Teleplay by : Ryan Johnson & Peter Lalayanis; Story by : Linda Ge	May 4, 2022	T13.23358	0.48
22	9	"The Enclave"	R.T. Thorne	Dan Hamamura	May 11, 2022	T13.23359	0.49
23	10	"Destruction"	Jeff Chan	Melissa Rundle	May 18, 2022	T13.23360	0.45
24	11	"Bloodline"	Kristin Windell	Michael Deigh	May 25, 2022	T13.23361	0.49
25	12	"Alliance"	Richard Speight, Jr.	Ryan Johnson & Peter Lalayanis	June 8, 2022	T13.23362	0.47
26	13	"The Source"	Joe Menendez	Christina M. Kim & Robert Berens	June 15, 2022	T13.23363	0.42

=== Season 3 (2022–23) ===
Kung Fu season 3 episodes
No. overall	No. in season	Title	Directed by	Written by	Original release date	Prod. code	U.S. viewers (millions)
27	1	"Shifu"	David Grossman	Christina M. Kim & Robert Berens	October 5, 2022	T13.23951	0.40
28	2	"Risk"	Geoffrey Wing Shotz	Dan Hamamura	October 12, 2022	T13.23952	0.42
29	3	"The Compass"	Joe Menendez	Ryan Johnson & Peter Lalayanis	October 19, 2022	T13.23953	0.39
30	4	"Harmony"	Richard Speight, Jr.	Richard Lowe	October 26, 2022	T13.23954	0.45
31	5	"Harvest"	Marielle Woods	Melissa Rundle	November 2, 2022	T13.23955	0.43
32	6	"Rescue"	Kristin Windell	Matt Young	November 9, 2022	T13.23956	0.39
33	7	"Villains"	Joe Menendez	John Bring	November 16, 2022	T13.23957	0.36
34	8	"Betrayal"	X. Dean Lim	Michael Deigh	November 30, 2022	T13.23958	0.40
35	9	"The Architect"	Lou Diamond Phillips	Hayley K. Goldstein	February 8, 2023	T13.23959	0.45
36	10	"Alias"	Tiffany Frances	Brian Anthony	February 15, 2023	T13.23960	0.41
37	11	"The Scepter"	David Grossman	Angela Treviño	February 22, 2023	T13.23961	0.36
38	12	"Loss"	Richard Speight, Jr.	Ryan Johnson & Peter Lalayanis	March 1, 2023	T13.23962	0.41
39	13	"Beginning"	Joe Menendez	Christina M. Kim & Robert Berens	March 8, 2023	T13.23963	0.40

== Production ==
=== Development ===
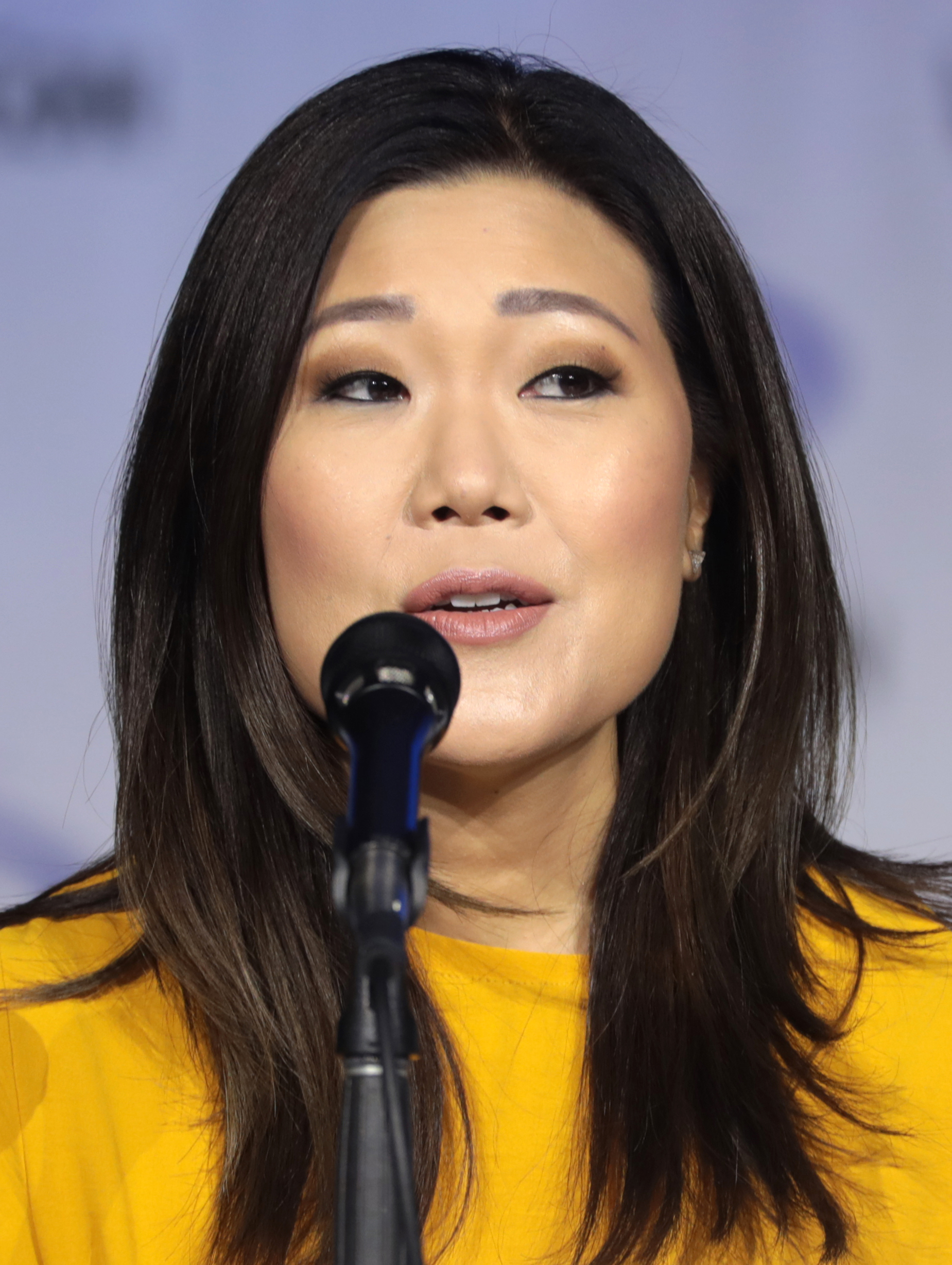
Developer and executive producer Christina M. Kim

In September 2017, it was reported that Greg Berlanti and Wendy Mericle were developing a female-led reboot of the series for Fox. In October 2018, it was announced that Sleepy Hollow executive producer Albert Kim was redeveloping the series and that Fox had given the project a put pilot commitment. In November 2019, it was announced that the reboot had moved to The CW – which is home to the majority of the Arrowverse shows, all of which are produced by Berlanti – and would be written by Christina M. Kim and Martin Gero. The series received a pilot order by the network. It was announced on May 12, 2020, that The CW had given Kung Fu a series order; a poster featuring Liang and social media accounts was set up the same day.

This was the third attempt of a Kung Fu reboot. According to PrimeTimer, "two different incarnations of this project have been set up in recent years at Fox, both featuring a female protagonist. Mega producers Berlanti Productions and Warner Bros. Television were behind both projects, but neither went to pilot." The first reboot attempt had a main character named Lucy Chang, a Buddhist monk and kung fu master who traveled through America in the 1950s in search of the man who stole her child years before. The second reboot attempt was about a young Chinese-American woman who inherits her father's kung fu studio, only to find out it's a secret center dedicated to helping members of the Chinatown community who have nowhere else to turn.

On May 3, 2021, The CW renewed the series for a second season. On March 22, 2022, The CW renewed the series for a third season. Kung Fu was canceled on May 11, 2023, after three seasons. Producers Warner Bros. Television had attempted to shop the show to other outlets in anticipation of the cancellation, but were unsuccessful.

=== Casting ===
In January and February 2020, Deadline reported the casting of the reboot with Tzi Ma and Kheng Hua Tan as Jin Shen and Mei-Li, Jon Prasida as Ryan Shen, Shannon Dang as Althea Shen, Eddie Liu as Henry Yan, and Olivia Liang as the character Nicky. In March 2020, Gavin Stenhouse and Gwendoline Yeo were cast as Evan Hartley and Zhilan. Tony Chung was cast as Dennis Soong on October 6, 2020. On November 18, 2020, Yvonne Chapman was cast as Zhilan in a recurring capacity. In February 2021, Ludi Lin and Bradley Gibson were cast as Kerwin and Joe Harper in recurring roles. On August 26, 2021, Chapman was promoted to series regular for the second season. On January 6, 2022, Vanessa Yao, Annie Q. and JB Tadena joined the cast in recurring roles for the second season. On July 7, 2022, it was announced that Chapman is set to return as series regular while Tadena was promoted to a series regular for the third season. On July 27, 2022, Ben Levin and Kim Rhodes were cast in recurring capacities for the third season.

=== Pre-production ===
The main actress Olivia Liang mentioned she avoided martial arts prior to this role due to stereotypes and would only learn when she got paid. She later embraced the sport after being cast and supported bringing depth to Asian characters with a martial arts background.

=== Filming ===
Principal photography for the first season began on October 16, 2020, and concluded on April 27, 2021, in Langley, British Columbia. Filming for the second season began on September 20, 2021, and concluded on March 15, 2022. Filming for the third season began on July 18, 2022, and concluded on December 20.

== Broadcast ==
Kung Fu premiered on April 7, 2021, on The CW. In Canada, the series airs on CTV 2, simulcast with The CW. The second season premiered on March 9, 2022. The third season premiered on October 5, 2022. The series finale aired on March 8, 2023.

== Reception ==
=== Critical response ===
On the review aggregator website Rotten Tomatoes, the series has an approval rating of 86% based on 21 critic reviews, with an average rating of 6.9/10. The website's critic consensus states, "Kung Fu's early episodes could use a little more focus, but beautifully choreographed fight scenes and a likable cast—led by Olivia Liang's star-making performance—inspire hope for a bright future." On Metacritic, it has a weighted average score of 65 out of 100 based on 10 critic reviews, indicating "generally favorable reviews".

Sam Stone of Comic Book Resources reviewed the series and stated that "nuances of each character relationship are explicitly laid out in conversation rather than hinted at or more organically woven into the show as if the characters aren't aware of their own backstories." While the fight choreography was well received, it relied on too much slow motion. CBR saw potential in the show with the cast as long it could overcome "bad habits" as the show progresses. Jennifer Griffin of TV Pulse Magazine was more critical and also agreed that there was too much exposition in the first episode. It relied on the predictable formulaic superhero format that Greg Berlanti has incorporated in previous CW shows. While having a mainly Asian-American cast was praised, the review goes on to say "Like America herself, the series needs to show its characters a little more love, and demonstrate a determination to look beyond formula, cliches, and stereotypes for that which truly connects us, as TV viewers, as superhero fans, but mostly as human beings." Robert Lloyd of LA Times wrote that the pilot was very busy with a messy exposition, which also reinforced Asian stereotypes. Max Gao of Vulture rated the first episode 4 out of 5 and said, "It wouldn't be a CW show without a classic love triangle—and Kung Fu has set up a brilliant one."

=== Ratings ===
==== Overall ====
Viewership and ratings per season of Kung Fu
Season	Timeslot (ET)	Episodes	First aired		Last aired		TV season
Season	Timeslot (ET)	Episodes	Date	Viewers (millions)	Date	Viewers (millions)	TV season
1	Wednesday 8:00 p.m.	13	April 7, 2021	1.40	July 21, 2021	0.83	2020–21
2	Wednesday 9:00 p.m.	13	March 9, 2022	0.63	June 15, 2022	0.42	2021–22
3	Wednesday 9:00 p.m.	13	October 5, 2022	0.40	March 8, 2023	0.40	2022–23

==== Season 1 ====
Viewership and ratings per episode of Kung Fu
No.	Title	Air date	Rating (18–49)	Viewers (millions)	DVR (18–49)	DVR viewers (millions)	Total (18–49)	Total viewers (millions)
1	"Pilot"	April 7, 2021	0.2	1.40	0.1	0.65	0.3	2.05
2	"Silence"	April 14, 2021	0.2	1.37	0.1	0.79	0.3	2.16
3	"Patience"	April 21, 2021	0.2	1.07	0.1	0.72	0.3	1.79
4	"Hand"	April 28, 2021	0.2	1.05	0.1	0.56	0.3	1.61
5	"Sanctuary"	May 5, 2021	0.2	0.96	0.1	0.51	0.3	1.46
6	"Rage"	May 12, 2021	0.2	0.96	0.1	0.48	0.3	1.43
7	"Guidance"	May 26, 2021	0.1	0.82	0.1	0.54	0.2	1.37
8	"Destiny"	June 2, 2021	0.1	0.82	0.1	0.45	0.2	1.27
9	"Isolation"	June 23, 2021	0.1	0.84	0.1	0.46	0.2	1.30
10	"Choice"	June 30, 2021	0.1	0.80	0.1	0.41	0.2	1.21
11	"Attachment"	July 7, 2021	0.1	0.82	0.1	0.40	0.2	1.22
12	"Sacrifice"	July 14, 2021	0.1	0.76	0.1	0.35	0.2	1.11
13	"Transformation"	July 21, 2021	0.1	0.83	0.1	0.36	0.2	1.19

==== Season 2 ====
Viewership and ratings per episode of Kung Fu
No.	Title	Air date	Rating (18–49)	Viewers (millions)	DVR (18–49)	DVR viewers (millions)	Total (18–49)	Total viewers (millions)
1	"Year of the Tiger: Part 1"	March 9, 2022	0.1	0.63	0.1	0.48	0.2	1.11
2	"Year of the Tiger: Part 2"	March 16, 2022	0.1	0.47	0.1	0.51	0.2	0.98
3	"The Bell"	March 23, 2022	0.1	0.65	0.1	0.48	0.2	1.13
4	"Clementine"	March 30, 2022	0.1	0.57	0.1	0.35	0.1	0.92
5	"Reunion"	April 6, 2022	0.1	0.43	0.1	0.38	0.1	0.80
6	"Jyu Sa"	April 13, 2022	0.1	0.48	0.1	0.47	0.1	0.95
7	"The Alchemist"	April 27, 2022	0.1	0.58	—N/a	—N/a	—N/a	—N/a
8	"Disclosure"	May 4, 2022	0.1	0.48	—N/a	—N/a	—N/a	—N/a
9	"The Enclave"	May 11, 2022	0.1	0.49	—N/a	—N/a	—N/a	—N/a
10	"Destruction"	May 18, 2022	0.1	0.45	—N/a	—N/a	—N/a	—N/a
11	"Bloodline"	May 25, 2022	0.1	0.49	—N/a	—N/a	—N/a	—N/a
12	"Alliance"	June 8, 2022	0.1	0.47	—N/a	—N/a	—N/a	TBD
13	"The Source"	June 15, 2022	0.1	0.42	—N/a	—N/a	—N/a	—N/a

==== Season 3 ====
Viewership and ratings per episode of Kung Fu
No.	Title	Air date	Rating (18–49)	Viewers (millions)	DVR (18–49)	DVR viewers (millions)	Total (18–49)	Total viewers (millions)
1	"Shifu"	October 5, 2022	0.1	0.40	0.1	0.43	0.1	0.83
2	"Risk"	October 12, 2022	0.1	0.42	0.1	0.39	0.1	0.81
3	"The Compass"	October 19, 2022	0.1	0.39	0.0	0.36	0.1	0.75
4	"Harmony"	October 26, 2022	0.1	0.45	0.0	0.34	0.1	0.79
5	"Harvest"	November 2, 2022	0.1	0.43	0.0	0.39	0.1	0.81
6	"Rescue"	November 9, 2022	0.1	0.39	0.0	0.36	0.1	0.76
7	"Villains"	November 16, 2022	0.1	0.36	0.0	0.39	0.1	0.75
8	"Betrayal"	November 30, 2022	0.1	0.40	—N/a	—N/a	—N/a	—N/a
9	"The Architect"	February 8, 2023	0.1	0.45	—N/a	—N/a	—N/a	—N/a
10	"Alias"	February 15, 2023	0.1	0.41	—N/a	—N/a	—N/a	—N/a
11	"The Scepter"	February 22, 2023	0.1	0.36	—N/a	—N/a	—N/a	—N/a
12	"Loss"	March 1, 2023	0.1	0.41	—N/a	—N/a	—N/a	—N/a
13	"Beginning"	March 8, 2023	0.1	0.40	—N/a	—N/a	—N/a	—N/a

=== Home media ===
Season 1	No. of episodes	DVD release dates		
Season 1	No. of episodes	Region 1	Region 2	Region 4
1	13	November 2, 2021		
Season 2	No. of episodes	DVD release dates		
Season 2	No. of episodes	Region 1	Region 2	Region 4
2	13	September 20, 2022		

== See also ==
- Warrior (TV series)
