= COINTELPRO =

Series of covert and illegal projects by the FBI

Counter Intelligence Program

Program overview
- Formed: 1956
- Dissolved: 1971
- Headquarters: J. Edgar Hoover Building Washington, D.C., U.S.; 38°53′43″N 77°01′30″W
- Director responsible: J. Edgar Hoover
- Assistant Director responsible: William C. Sullivan
- Parent agency: Federal Bureau of Investigation

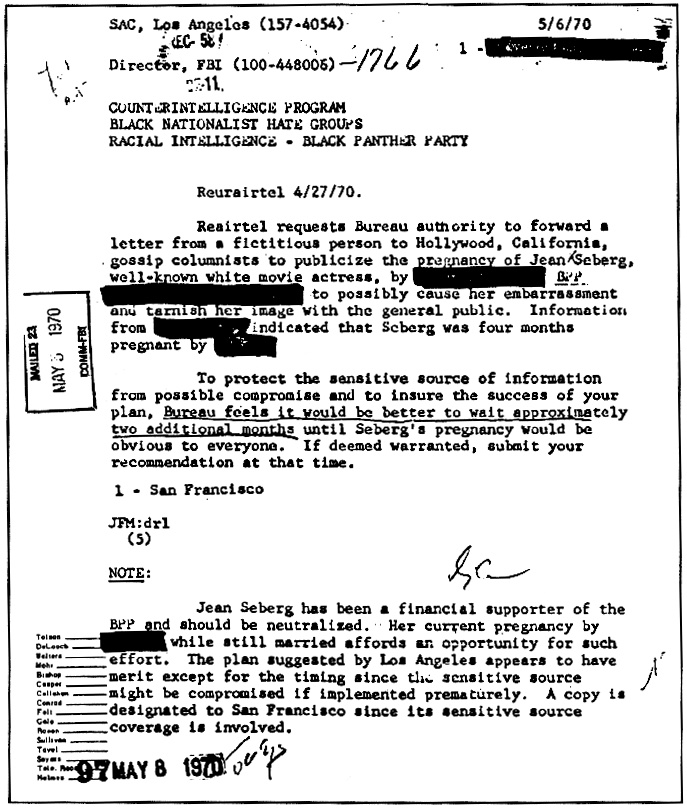
COINTELPRO memo proposing a plan to expose the pregnancy of actress Jean Seberg, a financial supporter of the Black Panther Party, hoping to "possibly cause her embarrassment or tarnish her image with the general public". Covert campaigns to publicly discredit activists and destroy their interpersonal relationships were a common tactic used by COINTELPRO agents.

COINTELPRO (a syllabic abbreviation derived from Counter Intelligence Program) was a series of covert projects conducted between 1956 and 1971 by the United States Federal Bureau of Investigation (FBI) aimed at surveilling, infiltrating, discrediting, and disrupting American political parties and organizations that the FBI concluded were subversive.

Groups and individuals targeted by the FBI included feminist organizations, the Communist Party USA, anti-Vietnam War organizers, activists in the civil rights and Black power movements (e.g., Martin Luther King Jr., Malcolm X, and the Black Panther Party), student organizations such as Students for a Democratic Society (SDS) and Student Nonviolent Coordinating Committee (SNCC), the American Indian Movement (AIM), Chicano and Mexican-American groups like the Brown Berets and the United Farm Workers, and independence movements (including Puerto Rican independence groups, such as the Young Lords and the Puerto Rican Socialist Party). Although the program primarily focused on organizations that were part of the broader New Left, they also targeted white supremacist groups, such as the Ku Klux Klan and the National States' Rights Party.

The FBI engaged in covert operations targeting domestic political groups from its earliest years. Covert operations under the official COINTELPRO label took place between 1956 and 1971. However, the official chronology of the program is the subject of debate. According to a US Senate investigation, "If COINTELPRO had been a short-lived aberration, the thorny problems of motivation, techniques, and control presented might be safely relegated to history. However, COINTELPRO existed for years on an ad hoc basis before the formal programs were instituted, and more significantly, COINTELPRO-type activities may continue today under the rubric of 'investigation'." Many of the tactics used in COINTELPRO are alleged to have seen continued use, including discrediting targets through psychological warfare; smearing individuals and groups using forged documents and by planting false reports in the media; harassment; wrongful imprisonment; illegal violence; and assassination. According to a Senate report, the FBI's motivation was "protecting national security, preventing violence, and maintaining the existing social and political order".

Beginning in 1969, Black Panther party leaders were targeted by the COINTELPRO and were "neutralized" through tactics including assassination, imprisonment, public humiliation, and false criminal charges. The Black Panthers targeted include Fred Hampton, Mark Clark, Assata Shakur, Geronimo Pratt, Mumia Abu-Jamal, and Marshall Conway. Common tactics used by COINTELPRO were perjury, witness harassment, witness intimidation, and withholding of exculpatory evidence.

FBI director J. Edgar Hoover issued directives governing COINTELPRO, ordering FBI agents to "expose, disrupt, misdirect, discredit, or otherwise neutralize" the activities of these movements and especially their leaders. Under Hoover, the official in charge of COINTELPRO was assistant director William C. Sullivan. Attorney General Robert F. Kennedy personally authorized some of the programs, giving written approval for limited wiretapping of Martin Luther King's phones "on a trial basis, for a month or so". Hoover extended the clearance so his men were "unshackled" to look for evidence in any areas of King's life they deemed worthy.

== History ==
The FBI initiated COINTELPRO, an abbreviation for Counterintelligence Program, in 1956 with the aim of undermining the operations of the Communist Party of the United States. In the 1960s, the scope of the scheme was broadened to encompass various additional domestic factions, including the Ku Klux Klan, the Socialist Workers Party, and the Black Panther Party. The cessation of all COINTELPRO operations occurred in 1971. Despite its relatively small scale (constituting approximately 0.2% of the FBI's overall workload during a 15-year timeframe), COINTELPRO was subsequently subject to criticism from both Congress and the American public for infringing upon First Amendment rights and other grounds.

Tactics included anonymous phone calls, Internal Revenue Service (IRS) audits, and the creation of documents that would divide the American communist organization internally. An October 1956 memo from Hoover reclassified the FBI's ongoing surveillance of black leaders, including it within COINTELPRO, with the justification that the movement was infiltrated by communists. In 1956, Hoover sent an open letter denouncing Dr. T. R. M. Howard, a civil rights leader, surgeon, and wealthy entrepreneur in Mississippi who had criticized FBI inaction in solving recent murders of George W. Lee, Emmett Till, and other African Americans in the South. When the Southern Christian Leadership Conference (SCLC), an African-American civil rights organization, was founded in 1957, the FBI began to monitor and target the group almost immediately, focusing particularly on Bayard Rustin, Stanley Levison, and eventually Martin Luther King Jr.

Part of the 1964 "suicide letter" that the FBI mailed anonymously to Martin Luther King Jr.. King interpreted the letter as an effort to persuade him to commit suicide. More portions of the letter would be released in 2014.

After the 1963 March on Washington for Jobs and Freedom, Hoover singled out King as a major target for COINTELPRO. Under pressure from Hoover to focus on King, Sullivan wrote:

In the light of King's powerful demagogic speech ... We must mark him now if we have not done so before, as the most dangerous Negro of the future in this nation from the standpoint of communism, the Negro, and national security.

Soon after, the FBI was systematically bugging King's home and his hotel rooms, as they were now aware that King was growing in stature daily as the most prominent leader of the civil rights movement.

In the mid-1960s, King began to publicly criticize the Bureau for giving insufficient attention to the use of terrorism by white supremacists. Hoover responded by publicly calling King the most "notorious liar" in the United States. In his 1991 memoir, Washington Post journalist Carl Rowan asserted that the FBI had sent at least one anonymous letter to King encouraging him to commit suicide. Historian Taylor Branch documents an anonymous "suicide package" sent by the FBI on November 21, 1964, that contained audio recordings obtained through tapping King's phone and placing bugs throughout various hotel rooms over the previous two years, and that was created two days after the announcement of King's impending Nobel Peace Prize. The tape, which was prepared by FBI audio technician John Matter, documented a series of sexual indiscretions by King combined with a letter telling him: "There is only one way out for you. You better take it before your filthy, abnormal, fraudulent self is bared to the nation". King believed that he was subsequently informed that the audio would be released to the media if he did not acquiesce and commit suicide prior to accepting his Nobel Peace Prize. When King refused to satisfy their coercion tactics, FBI Associate Director, Cartha D. DeLoach, commenced a media campaign offering the surveillance transcript to various news organizations, including Newsweek and Newsday. By 1969—one year after King's assassination—FBI efforts to "expose" him continued unabated. According to Church Committee findings, the Bureau "furnished ammunition to opponents that enabled attacks on King's memory and ... tried to block efforts to honor the slain leader." However, more portions of the FBI letter to King were made public in 2014 which suggested that the FBI's intent was to push King out of leadership and have "older leaders" like Roy Wilkins lead the civil right movement. The claim that the FBI's intent was to remove King from SCLC leadership was also previously backed in 1976 by the findings of the Church Committee.

During the same period the program also targeted Malcolm X. While an FBI spokesman has denied that the FBI was "directly" involved in Malcolm's murder in 1965, it is documented that the Bureau worked to "widen the rift" between Malcolm and Elijah Muhammad through infiltration and the "sparking of acrimonious debates within the organization", rumor-mongering, and other tactics designed to foster internal disputes, which ultimately led to Malcolm's assassination. The FBI heavily infiltrated Malcolm's Organization of Afro-American Unity in the final months of his life. Manning Marable's Pulitzer Prize-winning biography of Malcolm X asserts that most of the men who plotted Malcolm's assassination were never apprehended and that the full extent of the FBI's involvement in his death cannot be known.

Amidst the urban unrest of July–August 1967, the FBI began "COINTELPRO–BLACK HATE", which focused on King and the SCLC, as well as the Student Nonviolent Coordinating Committee (SNCC), the Revolutionary Action Movement (RAM), the Deacons for Defense and Justice, Congress of Racial Equality (CORE), and the Nation of Islam. BLACK HATE established the Ghetto Informant Program and instructed 23 FBI offices to "disrupt, misdirect, discredit, or otherwise neutralize the activities of black nationalist hate type organizations".

A March 1968 memo stated the program's goal was to "prevent the coalition of militant black nationalist groups"; to "Prevent the RISE OF A 'MESSIAH' who could unify ... the militant black nationalist movement"; "to pinpoint potential troublemakers and neutralize them before they exercise their potential for violence [against authorities]"; to "Prevent militant black nationalist groups and leaders from gaining RESPECTABILITY, by discrediting them to ... both the responsible community and to liberals who have vestiges of sympathy"; and to "prevent the long-range GROWTH of militant black organizations, especially among youth". Dr. King was said to have potential to be the "messiah" figure, should he abandon nonviolence and integrationism, and Stokely Carmichael was noted to have "the necessary charisma to be a real threat in this way" as he was portrayed as someone who espoused a much more militant vision of "black power". While the FBI was particularly concerned with leaders and organizers, they did not limit their scope of target to the heads of organizations. Individuals, e.g. writers, were also listed among the targets of operations.

This program coincided with a broader federal effort to prepare military responses for urban riots and began increased collaboration between the FBI, Central Intelligence Agency, National Security Agency, and the Department of Defense. The CIA launched its own domestic espionage project in 1967 called Operation CHAOS. A particular target was the Poor People's Campaign, a national effort organized by King and the SCLC to occupy Washington, DC. The FBI monitored and disrupted the campaign on a national level, while using targeted smear tactics locally to undermine support for the march. The Black Panther Party was another targeted organization, wherein the FBI collaborated to destroy the party from the inside out.

Overall, COINTELPRO encompassed disruption and sabotage of the Socialist Workers Party (1961), the Ku Klux Klan (1964), the Nation of Islam, the Black Panther Party (1967), and the entire New Left social/political movement, which included antiwar, community, and religious groups (1968). A later investigation by the Senate's Church Committee (see below) stated that "COINTELPRO began in 1956, in part because of frustration with Supreme Court rulings limiting the Government's power to proceed overtly against dissident groups." Official congressional committees and several court cases have concluded that COINTELPRO operations against communist and socialist groups exceeded statutory limits on FBI activity and violated constitutional guarantees of freedom of speech and association.

=== Uncovering ===
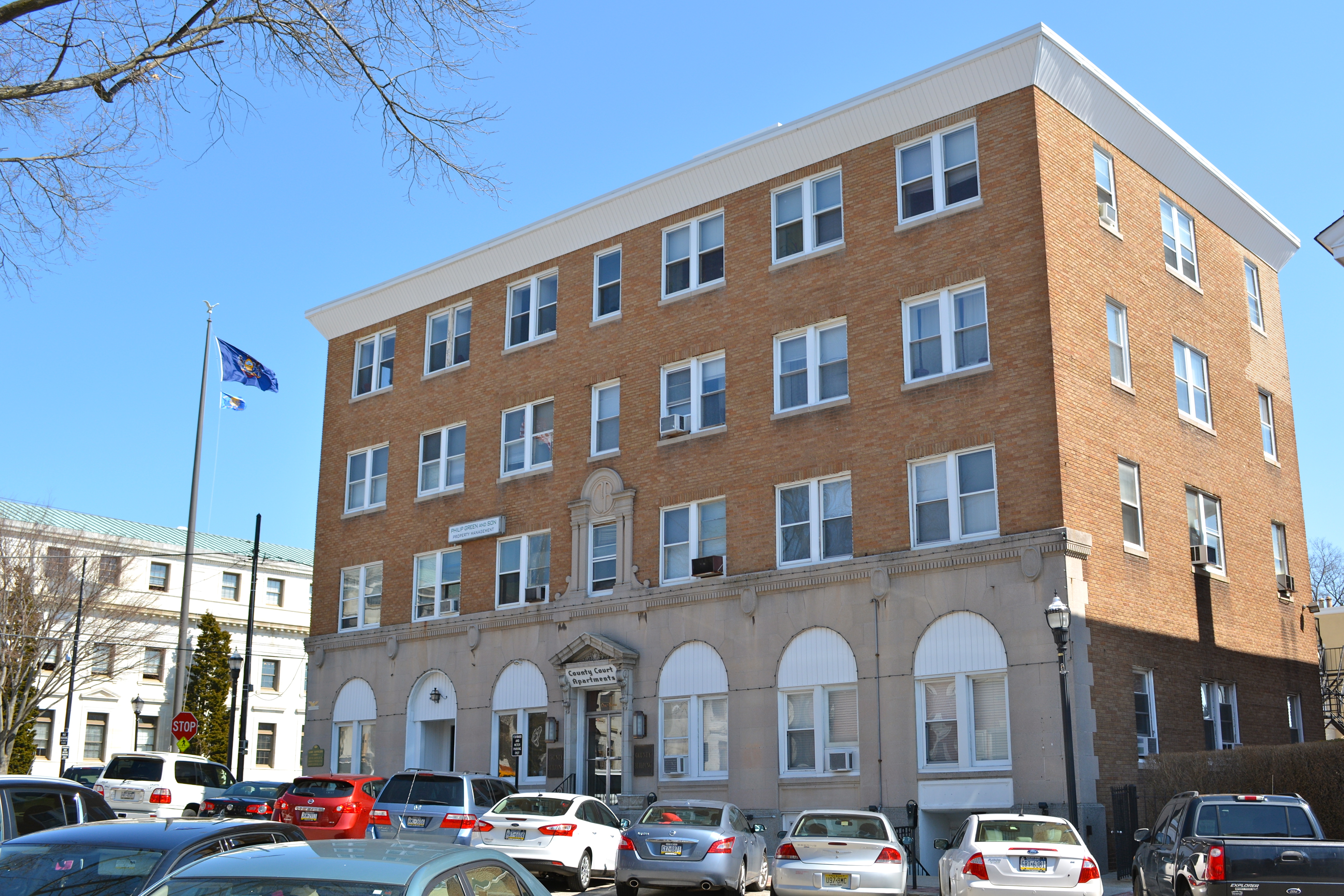
The building broken into by the Citizen's Commission to Investigate the FBI, at One Veterans Square, Media, Pennsylvania

The program was secret until March 8, 1971, when the Citizens' Commission to Investigate the FBI burgled an FBI field office in Media, Pennsylvania, took several dossiers, and exposed the program by passing this material to news agencies. The boxing match known as the Fight of the Century between Muhammad Ali and Joe Frazier in March 1971 provided cover for the activist group to successfully pull off the burglary. Muhammad Ali was a COINTELPRO target because he had joined the Nation of Islam and the anti-war movement.

Among the documents, Routing Slip: 100-49929 "COINTELPRO - NEW LEFT" (date: 8/9/68) was the "tip of the iceberg".

Many news organizations initially refused to immediately publish the information, with the notable exception of The Washington Post. After affirming the reliability of the documents, it published them on the front page (in defiance of the Attorney General's request), prompting other organizations to follow suit. Within the year, Director J. Edgar Hoover declared that the centralized COINTELPRO was over, and that all future counterintelligence operations would be handled case by case.

Additional documents were revealed in the course of separate lawsuits filed against the FBI by NBC correspondent Carl Stern, the Socialist Workers Party, and a number of other groups. In 1976 the Select Committee to Study Governmental Operations with Respect to Intelligence Activities of the United States Senate, commonly referred to as the "Church Committee" after its chairman, Senator Frank Church (Democrat, Idaho), launched a major investigation of the FBI and COINTELPRO. Many released documents have been partly or entirely redacted.

The Final Report of the Select Committee castigated the conduct of the intelligence community in its domestic operations (including COINTELPRO) in no uncertain terms:

The Committee finds that the domestic activities of the intelligence community at times violated specific statutory prohibitions and infringed the constitutional rights of American citizens. The legal questions involved in intelligence programs were often not considered. On other occasions, they were intentionally disregarded in the belief that because the programs served the "national security" the law did not apply. While intelligence officers on occasion failed to disclose to their superiors programs which were illegal or of questionable legality, the Committee finds that the most serious breaches of duty were those of senior officials, who were responsible for controlling intelligence activities and generally failed to assure compliance with the law. Many of the techniques used would be intolerable in a democratic society even if all of the targets had been involved in violent activity, but COINTELPRO went far beyond that ... the Bureau conducted a sophisticated vigilante operation aimed squarely at preventing the exercise of First Amendment rights of speech and association, on the theory that preventing the growth of dangerous groups and the propagation of dangerous ideas would protect the national security and deter violence.

The Church Committee documented a history of the FBI (initially called BOI until 1936) exercising political repression as far back as World War I, and through the 1920s, when agents were charged with rounding up "anarchists, communists, socialists, reformists and revolutionaries" for deportation. From 1936 through 1976, the domestic operations were increased against political and anti-war groups.

In 1988, the Socialist Workers Party won a landmark settlement in federal court against the Bureau for its third Counterintelligence Program, which Hoover's agency launched against the SWP in 1961.

== FBI claimed intent of COINTELPRO ==
The FBI claimed that the purpose behind COINTELPRO was to "expose, disrupt, misdirect, or otherwise neutralize" groups that the FBI officials believed were "subversive" by instructing FBI field operatives to:

1. Create a negative public image for target groups (for example through surveilling activists and then releasing negative personal information to the public)
2. Break down internal organization by creating conflicts (for example, by having agents exacerbate racial tensions, or send anonymous letters to try to create conflicts)
3. Create dissension between groups (for example, by spreading rumors that other groups were stealing money)
4. Restrict access to public resources (for example, by pressuring non-profit organizations to cut off funding or material support)
5. Restrict the ability to organize protest (for example, through agents promoting violence against police during planning and at protests)
6. Restrict the ability of individuals to participate in group activities (for example, by character assassinations, false arrests, surveillance.)

== Range of targets ==
At its inception, the program's main target was the Communist Party.

In an interview with the BBC's Andrew Marr in February 1996, Noam Chomsky—a political activist and MIT professor of linguistics—spoke about the purpose and the targets of COINTELPRO, saying:

COINTELPRO was a program of subversion carried out not by a couple of petty crooks but by the national political police, the FBI, under four administrations ... by the time it got through, I won't run through the whole story, it was aimed at the entire new left, at the women's movement, at the whole black movement, it was extremely broad. Its actions went as far as political assassination.

According to the Church Committee:

While the declared purposes of these programs were to protect the "national security" or prevent violence, Bureau witnesses admit that many of the targets were nonviolent and most had no connections with a foreign power. Indeed, nonviolent organizations and individuals were targeted because the Bureau believed they represented a "potential" for violence—and nonviolent citizens who were against the war in Vietnam were targeted because they gave "aid and comfort" to violent demonstrators by lending respectability to their cause.

The imprecision of the targeting is demonstrated by the inability of the Bureau to define the subjects of the programs. The Black Nationalist program, according to its supervisor, included "a great number of organizations that you might not today characterize as black nationalist but which were in fact primarily black". Thus, the nonviolent Southern Christian Leadership Conference was labeled as a Black Nationalist "Hate Group".

Furthermore, the actual targets were chosen from a far broader group than the titles of the programs would imply. The CPUSA program targeted not only Communist Party members but also sponsors of the National Committee to Abolish the House Un-American Activities Committee and civil rights leaders allegedly under Communist influence or deemed to be not sufficiently "anti-Communist". The Socialist Workers Party program included non-SWP sponsors of anti-war demonstrations which were cosponsored by the SWP or the Young Socialist Alliance, its youth group. The Black Nationalist program targeted a range of organizations from the Panthers to SNCC to the peaceful Southern Christian Leadership Conference, and included every Black Student Union and many other black student groups. New Left targets ranged from the SDS to the InterUniversity Committee for Debate on Foreign Policy, from Antioch College ("vanguard of the New Left") to the New Mexico Free University and other "alternate" schools, and from underground newspapers to students' protesting university censorship of a student publication by carrying signs with four-letter words on them.

Examples of surveillance, spanning all presidents from FDR to Nixon, both legal and illegal, contained in the Church Committee report:

- President Roosevelt (1933–1945) asked the FBI to put in its files the names of citizens sending telegrams to the White House opposing his "national defense" policy and supporting Col. Charles Lindbergh.
- President Truman (1945–1953) received inside information on a former Roosevelt aide's efforts to influence his appointments, labor union negotiating plans, and the publishing plans of journalists.
- President Eisenhower (1953–1961) received reports on purely political and social contacts with foreign officials by Bernard Baruch, Eleanor Roosevelt, and Supreme Court Justice William O. Douglas.
- The Kennedy administration (1961–1963) had the FBI wiretap a congressional staff member, three executive officials, a lobbyist, and a Washington law firm. US Attorney General Robert F. Kennedy received the fruits of an FBI wiretap on Martin Luther King Jr. and an electronic listening device targeting a congressman, both of which yielded information of a political nature.
- President Johnson (1963–1969) asked the FBI to conduct "name checks" of his critics and members of the staff of his 1964 opponent, Senator Barry Goldwater. He also requested purely political intelligence on his critics in the Senate and received extensive intelligence reports on political activity at the 1964 Democratic Convention from FBI electronic surveillance.
- President Nixon (1969–1974) authorized a program of wiretaps, which produced for the White House purely political or personal information unrelated to national security, including information about a Supreme Court Justice.

Groups that were known to be targets of COINTELPRO operations include:

- Various communist and socialist organizations.
- Organizations and individuals associated with the civil rights movement, including Dr. Martin Luther King Jr. and others associated with the Southern Christian Leadership Conference, the National Association for the Advancement of Colored People, the Congress of Racial Equality, and other civil rights organizations.
- Black nationalist groups.
- The Young Lords.
- The American Indian Movement.
- The Ku Klux Klan.
- The American Nazi Party.
- The National States' Rights Party.
- A broad range of organizations labeled "New Left", Students for a Democratic Society, the Weathermen, and environmental activists.
- Almost all groups protesting the Vietnam War, as well as individual student demonstrators with no group affiliation.
- The National Lawyers Guild.
- Various organizations and individuals associated with the women's rights movement.
- Nationalist groups, such as those seeking Independence for Puerto Rico, reunification of Ireland, and Cuban exile movements including Orlando Bosch's Cuban Power and the Cuban Nationalist Movement.
- Additional notable American individuals.

The COINTELPRO operators targeted multiple groups at once and encouraged splintering of these groups from within. In letter-writing campaigns (wherein false letters were sent on behalf of members of parties), the FBI ensured that groups would not unite in their causes. For instance, they launched a campaign specifically to alienate the Black Panther Party from the Mau Maus, Young Lords, Young Patriots and SDS. These racially diverse groups had been building alliances, in part due to charismatic leaders, such as Fred Hampton and his attempts to create a "Rainbow Coalition". The FBI was concerned with ensuring that groups could not gain traction through unity, specifically across racial lines. One of the main ways of targeting these groups was to arouse suspicion between the different parties and causes. In this way the bureau took on a divide-and-conquer offensive.

The COINTELPRO documents show numerous cases of the FBI's intentions to prevent and disrupt protests against the Vietnam War. Many techniques were used to accomplish this task. "These included promoting splits among antiwar forces, encouraging red-baiting of communists and socialists, and pushing violent confrontations as an alternative to massive, peaceful demonstrations." One 1966 COINTELPRO operation tried to redirect the Socialist Workers Party from their pledge of support for the antiwar movement.

The FBI has said that it no longer undertakes COINTELPRO or COINTELPRO-like operations. However, critics have claimed that agency programs in the spirit of COINTELPRO targeted groups such as the Committee in Solidarity with the People of El Salvador, the American Indian Movement, Earth First!, and the anti-globalization movement.

== Methods ==
Body of Fred Hampton, national spokesman for the Black Panther Party, who was assassinated by members of the Chicago Police Department, with the raid itself being a COINTELPRO operation.

According to attorney Brian Glick in his book War at Home, the FBI used five main methods during COINTELPRO:

1. Infiltration: Agents and informers did not merely spy on political activists. Their main purpose was to discredit, disrupt and negatively redirect action. Their very presence served to undermine trust and scare off potential supporters. The FBI and police exploited this fear to smear genuine activists as agents.
2. Psychological warfare: The FBI and police used a myriad of "dirty tricks" to undermine movements. They planted false media stories and published bogus leaflets and other publications in the name of targeted groups. They forged correspondence, sent anonymous letters, and made anonymous telephone calls. They spread misinformation about meetings and events, set up pseudo movement groups run by government agents, and manipulated or strong-armed parents, employers, landlords, school officials, and others to cause trouble for activists. They used bad-jacketing to create suspicion about targeted activists, sometimes with lethal consequences.
3. Harassment via the legal system: The FBI and police abused the legal system to harass dissidents and make them appear to be criminals. Officers of the law gave perjured testimony and presented fabricated evidence as a pretext for false arrests and wrongful imprisonment. They discriminatorily enforced tax laws and other government regulations and used conspicuous surveillance, "investigative" interviews, and grand jury subpoenas in an effort to intimidate activists and silence their supporters.
4. Illegal force: The FBI conspired with local police departments to threaten dissidents; to conduct illegal break-ins in order to search dissident homes; and to commit vandalism, assaults, beatings and assassinations.
5. Undermine public opinion: One of the primary ways the FBI targeted organizations was by challenging their reputations in the community and denying them a platform to gain legitimacy. Hoover specifically designed programs to block leaders from "spreading their philosophy publicly or through the communications media". Furthermore, the organization created and controlled negative media meant to undermine black power organizations. For instance, they oversaw the creation of "documentaries" skillfully edited to paint the Black Panther Party as aggressive, and false newspapers that spread misinformation about party members. The ability of the FBI to create distrust within and between revolutionary organizations tainted their public image and weakened chances at unity and public support.

The FBI specifically developed tactics intended to heighten tension and hostility between various factions in the black power movement, for example between the Black Panthers and the US Organization. For instance, the FBI sent a fake letter to the US Organization exposing a supposed Black Panther plot to murder the head of the US Organization, Ron Karenga. They then intensified this by spreading falsely attributed cartoons in the black communities pitting the Black Panther Party against the US Organization. This resulted in numerous deaths, among which were San Diego Black Panther Party members John Huggins, Bunchy Carter and Sylvester Bell. Another example of the FBI's anonymous letter writing campaign is how they turned the Blackstone Rangers head, Jeff Fort, against former ally Fred Hampton, by stating that Hampton had a hit on Fort. They also were instrumental in developing the rift between Black Panther Party leaders Eldridge Cleaver and Huey Newton, as executed through false letters inciting the two leaders of the Black Panther Party. The FBI also created fake organizations, such as the Ad Hoc Committee for a Marxist-Leninist Party, to spur division, derail unification efforts between communist and socialist organizations, and place informants with falsified "radical" backgrounds.

Dhoruba Bin Wahad, a former Black Panther, reflects on how these tactics made him feel, saying he had a combat mentality and felt like he was at war with the government. When asked about why he thinks the Black Panthers were targeted he said,

In the United States, the equivalent of the military was the local police. During the early sixties, at the height of the civil rights movement, and the human rights movement, the police in the United States became increasingly militaristic. They began to train out of military bases in the United States. The Law Enforcement Assistance Act supplied local police with military technology, everything from assault rifles to army personnel carriers. In his opinion, the Counterintelligence Program went hand-in-hand with the militarization of the police in the Black community, with the militarization of police in America.

The FBI also conspired with the police departments of many U.S. cities (San Diego, Los Angeles, San Francisco, Oakland, Philadelphia, Chicago) to encourage repeated raids on Black Panther homes—often with little or no evidence of violations of federal, state, or local laws—which resulted in the police killing many members of the Black Panther Party, most notably Chicago Black Panther Party Chairman Fred Hampton on December 4, 1969. Whether or not the FBI sanctioned his killing remains unproven. Before the death of Hampton, long-term infiltrator, William O'Neal, shared floor plans of his apartment with the COINTELPRO team. He then gave Hampton a dose of secobarbital that rendered Hampton unconscious during the raid on his home.

In order to eliminate black militant leaders whom they considered dangerous, the FBI is believed to have worked with local police departments to target specific individuals, accuse them of crimes they did not commit, suppress exculpatory evidence and falsely incarcerate them. Elmer "Geronimo" Pratt, a Black Panther Party leader, was incarcerated for 27 years before a California Superior Court vacated his murder conviction, ultimately freeing him. Appearing before the court, an FBI agent testified that he believed Pratt had been framed, because both the FBI and the Los Angeles Police Department knew he had not been in the area at the time the murder occurred.

Some sources claim that the FBI conducted more than 200 "black bag jobs", which were warrantless surreptitious entries, against the targeted groups and their members.

In 1969 the FBI special agent in San Francisco wrote Hoover that his investigation of the Black Panther Party had concluded that in his city, at least, the Panthers were primarily engaged in feeding breakfast to children. Hoover fired back a memo implying the agent's career goals would be directly affected by his supplying evidence to support Hoover's view that the Black Panther Party was "a violence-prone organization seeking to overthrow the Government by revolutionary means".

Hoover supported using false claims to attack his political enemies. In one memo he wrote: "Purpose of counterintelligence action is to disrupt the Black Panther Party and it is immaterial whether facts exist to substantiate the charge."

Viola's family endured Hoover's claiming that cuts on her arm from the car's shattered window indicated "recent drug use" and that her proximity to Moton resembled "a necking party", despite an autopsy revealing no traces of drugs in her system and indicating she hadn't had sex recently before her death.

— On the FBI's targeting of Viola Liuzzo

In one particularly controversial 1965 incident, white civil rights worker Viola Liuzzo was murdered by Ku Klux Klansmen, who gave chase and fired shots into her car after noticing that her passenger was a young black man; one of the Klansmen was Gary Thomas Rowe, an acknowledged FBI informant. The FBI spread rumors that Liuzzo was a member of the Communist Party and had abandoned her children to have sexual relationships with African Americans involved in the civil rights movement. FBI records show that J. Edgar Hoover personally communicated these insinuations to President Johnson. Despite this, three Klansmen would be convicted in a federal trial for Liuzzo's murder in December 1965.

FBI informant Rowe has also been implicated in some of the most violent crimes of the 1960s civil rights era, including attacks on the Freedom Riders and the 1963 Birmingham, Alabama 16th Street Baptist Church bombing.

The ACLU has claimed the FBI supported an extreme right-wing group of former Minutemen, transforming it into a group called the Secret Army Organization that targeted groups, activists, and leaders involved in the Anti-War Movement, using both intimidation and violent acts.

Hoover ordered preemptive action "to pinpoint potential troublemakers and neutralize them before they exercise their potential for violence".

== Illegal surveillance ==
The final report of the Church Committee concluded:

Too many people have been spied upon by too many Government agencies and too much information has been illegally collected. The Government has often undertaken the secret surveillance of citizens on the basis of their political beliefs, even when those beliefs posed no threat of violence or illegal acts on behalf of a hostile foreign power. The Government, operating primarily through secret and biased informants, but also using other intrusive techniques, such as wiretaps, microphone "bugs", surreptitious mail opening, and break-ins, has swept in vast amounts of information about the personal lives, views, and associations of American citizens. Investigations of groups deemed potentially dangerous—and even of groups suspected of associating with potentially dangerous organizations—have continued for decades, despite the fact that those groups did not engage in unlawful activity.

Groups and individuals have been assaulted, repressed, harassed and disrupted because of their political views, social beliefs and their lifestyles. Investigations have been based upon vague standards whose breadth made excessive collection inevitable. Unsavory, harmful and vicious tactics have been employed—including anonymous attempts to break up marriages, disrupt meetings, ostracize persons from their professions, and provoke target groups into rivalries that might result in deaths. Intelligence agencies have served the political and personal objectives of presidents and other high officials. While the agencies often committed excesses in response to pressure from high officials in the Executive branch and Congress, they also occasionally initiated improper activities and then concealed them from officials whom they had a duty to inform.

Governmental officials—including those whose principal duty is to enforce the law—have violated or ignored the law over long periods of time and have advocated and defended their right to break the law.

The Constitutional system of checks and balances has not adequately controlled intelligence activities. Until recently the Executive branch has neither delineated the scope of permissible activities nor established procedures for supervising intelligence agencies. Congress has failed to exercise sufficient oversight, seldom questioning the use to which its appropriations were being put. Most domestic intelligence issues have not reached the courts, and in those cases when they have reached the courts, the judiciary has been reluctant to grapple with them.

== Later similar operations ==
While COINTELPRO was officially terminated in April 1971, domestic espionage continued. Between 1972 and 1974, it is documented that the Bureau planted over 500 bugs without a warrant and opened over 2,000 pieces of personal mail. More recent targets of covert action include the American Indian Movement (AIM), Earth First!, and Committees in Solidarity with the People of El Salvador. Documents released under the FOIA show that the FBI tracked the late David Halberstam—a Pulitzer Prize-winning journalist and author—for more than two decades. "Counterterrorism" guidelines implemented during the Reagan administration have been described as allowing a return to COINTELPRO tactics. Some radical groups accuse factional opponents of being FBI informants or assume the FBI is infiltrating the movement. COINTELPRO survivor Filiberto Ojeda Rios was killed by the FBI's hostage rescue team in 2005, his death described by a United Nations special committee as an assassination.

Environmentalist Eric McDavid, convicted on arson charges, was released after documents emerged demonstrating that the FBI informant in his Earth Liberation Front group provided crucial leadership, information, and material without which the crime could not have been committed, repeating the same pattern of behavior of COINTELPRO. It has been claimed these sorts of practices have become widespread in FBI "counter-terrorism" cases targeting Muslims in the 2009 Bronx terrorism plot and others.

Authors, such as Ward Churchill, Rex Weyler, and Peter Matthiessen allege that the federal government intended to acquire uranium deposits on the Lakota tribe's reservation land, and that this motivated a larger government conspiracy against AIM activists on the Pine Ridge reservation. Others believe COINTELPRO continues and similar actions are being taken against activist groups. Caroline Woidat says that, with respect to Native Americans, COINTELPRO should be understood within a historical context in which "Native Americans have been viewed and have viewed the world themselves through the lens of conspiracy theory." Other authors argue that while some conspiracy theories related to COINTELPRO are unfounded, the issue of ongoing government surveillance and repression is real.

FBI Agent Richard G. Held is known to have increased FBI support for the Guardians of the Oglala Nation (GOON) squads, who were a private paramilitary group established in 1972 by the elected tribal chairman, Dick Wilson, under authority of the Oglala Sioux. AIM accused GOONs of involvement in 300 assaults and 64 homicides of political opponents. Despite this, The Bureau rarely investigated them and instead used its resources overwhelmingly to prosecute AIM. In 2000, the FBI released a report regarding these alleged unsolved violent deaths on Pine Ridge reservation and accounted for most of the deaths and disputed the claims of unsolved murders. The report stated that only four deaths were unsolved and that some deaths were not murders.

A lawsuit filed by Dhoruba bin-Wahad, a former member of the Black Panther Party, revealed the existence of multiple programs similar to COINTELPRO including "Newkill" (New York Police Killings), Chesrob (a program focused on Panther Assata Shakur), and PRISACTS (The Prison Activists Surveillance Program), a program that focused on "neutralizing" political activists who were already in prison, many of whom (like bin-Wahad) had been targeted by COINTELPRO.

In April 2018, the Atlanta Black Star characterized the FBI as still engaging in COINTELPRO behavior by surveilling the Black Lives Matter movement. Internal documents dated as late as 2017 showed that the FBI had surveilled the movement. In 2014, the FBI tracked a Black Lives Matter activist using surveillance tactics which The Intercept found "reminiscent of a rich American history of targeting black Americans," including COINTELPRO. This practice, along with the imprisonment of black activists for their views, has been associated with the new FBI designation of "Black Identity Extremists".

Defending Rights & Dissent, a civil liberties group, cataloged known instances of First Amendment abuses and political surveillance by the FBI since 2010. The organization found that the FBI devoted disproportionate resources to spy on peaceful left-leaning civil society groups, including Occupy Wall Street, economic justice advocates, racial justice movements, environmentalists, Abolish ICE, and various anti-war movements.

In December 2012, the FBI released redacted documents in response to a Freedom of Information Act request from the Partnership for Civil Justice Fund (PCJF). Mara Verheyden-Hilliard, the executive director of PCJF, said the documents showed that FBI counterterrorism agents had monitored the Occupy movement from its inception in August 2011 and that the FBI acted improperly by collecting "information on people's free-speech actions" and entering it into "unregulated databases, a vast storehouse of information widely disseminated to a range of law-enforcement and, apparently, private entities" (see Domestic Security Alliance Council). The FBI also communicated with the New York Stock Exchange, banks, private businesses and state and local police forces about the movement. In 2014, the PCJF obtained an additional 4,000 pages of unclassified documents through a Freedom of Information Act request, showing "details of the scrutiny of the Occupy protests in 2011 and 2012 by law enforcement officers, federal officials, security contractors and others."

In October 2020, Katie Reiter, chief of staff to Michigan state Senator Rosemary Bayer, had an FBI task force come to her house and aggressively question her about a draft bill she had recently discussed which would have limited the use of tear gas against protesters. Reiter had discussed the proposed ban on tear gas on a private 90-minute Zoom call with Bayer and a handful of other staffers. Reiter says the two officers refused to answer any questions about how they became aware of her private meeting. The Intercept reported about the incident: "Reiter said that the FBI's visit left her confused and fearful. 'It has impacted my sleep, it has caused me quite a bit of anxiety,' she said. 'And it has certainly impacted how we talk. I try not to let it, I'll just be like, "No, we're going to talk about this." But it's in my mind all the time.'" A spokesperson for the FBI declined to comment on the record, as did a spokesperson for Zoom.

== Notable people targeted ==
- Ralph Abernathy{
- Mumia Abu-Jamal
- Muhammad Ali
- James Baldwin
- Judi Bari
- Dhoruba bin-Wahad
- H. Rap Brown
- Bunchy Carter
- Eldridge Cleaver
- Marshall Conway
- Jeff Fort
- Howard Bruce Franklin
- Fred Hampton
- Tom Hayden
- Ernest Hemingway
- Abbie Hoffman
- Ericka Huggins
- Jose Cha Cha Jimenez
- Muhammad Kenyatta
- Clark Kerr
- Martin Luther King Jr.
- Stanley Levison
- Viola Liuzzo
- Malcolm X
- Jessica Mitford
- Huey P. Newton
- Geronimo Pratt
- Filiberto Ojeda Ríos
- Mario Savio
- Jean Seberg
- Assata Shakur
- Morris Starsky
- John Trudell
- Kwame Ture

== See also ==
- 1971, 2014 documentary film on the break-in that first exposed COINTELPRO
- Active measures
- Arctic Frost investigation
- All Power to the People, film documentary by Lee Lew-Lee 1996
- Christopher Pyle § Government Service, Pyle revealed a similar program by the U.S. Army
- Denial and deception
- Laird v. Tatum
- Mark Felt, also known as Deep Throat served as chief inspector of COINTELPRO field operations
- MAINWAY, a database of telephone metadata used by the NSA
- MKUltra
- Mississippi State Sovereignty Commission
- Operation Gladio
- Operation Mockingbird
- Political prisoners in the United States
- PROFUNC, a similar classified Canadian program which focused primarily on communists and crypto-communists
- Red Squad, police intelligence/anti-dissident units which were later operated under COINTELPRO
- Surveillance abuse
- Thermcon
- Zersetzung
