= Behavioral Analysis Unit =

Unit of the US Federal Bureau of Investigation

- Active: 1985–present (40–41 years)
- Country: United States
- Agency: Federal Bureau of Investigation
- Part of: Criminal, Cyber, Sex Crimes, Response, and Services Branch: Critical Incident Response Group; Investigative and Operations Support Section; National Center for the Analysis of Violent Crime
- Abbreviation: BAU

The Behavioral Analysis Unit (BAU), formerly known as the Behavioral Science Unit, is a department of the Federal Bureau of Investigation's (FBI) National Center for the Analysis of Violent Crime that uses behavioral analysts to assist in criminal investigations. Their mission is to provide behavioral-based investigative and/or operational support by applying case experience, research, and training to complex and time-sensitive crimes, typically involving acts or threats of violence.

== History and structure ==
The Behavioral Analysis Unit was originally called the Behavioral Science Unit. The Behavioral Analysis Unit (BAU) was launched in 1972.

The Investigations & Operations Support Section is a branch of the FBI's overall Critical Incident Response Group. It provides personnel and training to assist in investigations throughout the country and at US embassies worldwide. It also supports other Critical Incident Response Groups within the FBI, FBI headquarters and field offices, FBI legal attaches (at embassies abroad), and all US law enforcement agencies. The section is divided into two main sections: the National Center for the Analysis of Violent Crime and the Operations Support Branch.

The National Center for the Analysis of Violent Crime consists of five Behavioral Analysis Units, or "BAU"s:

- Behavioral Analysis Unit 1 (counterterrorism, arson and bombing matters)
- Behavioral Analysis Unit 2 (threats, cyber crime, and public corruption)

Cybercrime has been a problem for the FBI. In today's digital landscape, cybercriminals share similar motives with traditional criminals, but the complex technological aspect of cybercrime poses unique challenges for law enforcement. There have been different approaches to reduce cybercrime through technological advances. Computer sciences and cybersecurity have applied this by using Intrusion Detection Systems (IDSs), Intrusion Prevention Systems (IPSs), firewalls, and anti-virus software to mitigate cyberattack threats.

- Behavioral Analysis Unit 3 (crimes against children)

Behavioral Analysis Unit 3 focuses on crimes against children and provides support to other law enforcement officials through criminal investigative analysis, a process through which analysts review, assess, and interpret offender behavior. Behavioral Analysis Unit 3 also assists other units within the FBI that specialize in crimes against children, such as the Violent Crimes Against Children program (VCAC). The Violent Crimes Against Children program aims to provide quick and proactive responses to threats and/or acts of abuse and exploitation of children that fall within the FBI's jurisdiction.

The VCAC prioritizes the following violations against children:

1. Child abductions: disappearance of a minor, typically 12 years or younger
2. Contact offenses against children: production of child sexual abuse material, sextortion, and travel with the intention to engage in sexual activity with minors
3. Sexual exploitation of children: producing, trading, distributing, and/or selling child sexual abuse material
4. Trafficking of child sexual abuse material: either distribution or possession of the material
5. International parental kidnapping: wrongfully keeping a child outside the United States with the intention of obstructing the lawful exercise of parental rights

The Violent Crimes Against Children program responds to the above violations by aiding the child victims and supporting federal, state, local, tribal, and international law enforcement in identifying, investigating, and deterring individuals and groups that exploit children.

- Behavioral Analysis Unit 4 (crimes against adults, ViCAP)

The ViCAP (Violent Criminal Apprehension Program) is a computer program that was established in 1984 to help law enforcement solve and identify serial murders. The ViCAP uses a 15-page format that requests information about a crime that was committed.

This includes information on:

- Victim
- Offender
- Crime scene
- Physical evidence

This report is then relayed to the National Center for the Analysis of Violent Crime which is then put in the system of the FBI's Behavioral Analysis Unit in Quantico, Virginia. The report is analyzed by the agents to investigate the Criminal Investigation Analysis of a killer. This can help solve unsolved cases and/or new cases in the future, by identifying the suspects of the cases.

- Behavioral Analysis Unit 5 (research, strategy, and instruction)

The FBI's Behavioral Analysis Unit 5 (BAU-5), relies on extensive training and law enforcement experience to develop and apply behavioral profiles. This unit focuses on research, strategy, and instruction, crucial elements that help understand and manage criminal behavior more effectively. The field of criminal investigative analysis, which includes behavioral profiling, had evolved significantly since the 1970s when the FBI's Behavioral Science Unit began offering profiling assistance to other law enforcement agencies. Initially, profiling was more about understanding unknown offenders' personalities and behavioral traits based on crime scene analysis. This method has since grown into a more comprehensive tool known as criminal investigative analysis, encompassing a variety of services such as investigative suggestions, interview strategies, and trial support.

One of BAU-5's core activities is conducting research and providing instructional courses that enhance the skills of law enforcement officers nationwide. The unit's efforts aim to educate officers on applied behavior analysis applying behavioral analysis techniques effectively in their cases. This training often involves analyzing solved and unsolved cases to identify patterns suggesting similar offender behaviors.

The strategy aspect of BAU-5's work involves advising law enforcement agencies on various facets of criminal investigations. This could include developing interview techniques, providing investigative leads, or assisting with media strategy in high-profile cases. The unit's role is often advisory, providing the groundwork for local agencies to build their cases rather than actively participating in the investigation.

Despite its proven utility, criminal investigative analysis continues to face debates over its methodology and practitioner qualifications. Critics and proponents alike discuss whether the practice should be more empirical evidence driven or rely on the seasoned intuition of experienced investigators. This ongoing debate highlights the need for continuous research and evaluation to refine criminal profiling techniques and ensure they are practical and scientifically valid.

The headquarters for the BAU is located in Quantico, Virginia.

The Operations Support Branch contains three main units:

- Crisis Management Unit
- Special Events Management Unit
- Rapid Deployment & Technology Unit

== Operation ==
The BAU receives requests for services from federal, state, local, and international law enforcement agencies. Responses to these requests for BAU assistance are facilitated through the network of field coordinators of the National Center for the Analysis of Violent Crime. BAU services can consist of on-site case consultations, telephone conference calls, and/or consultations held at the BAU with case investigators.

BAU assistance to law enforcement agencies is provided through the process of "criminal investigative analysis." Criminal investigative analysis is a process of reviewing crimes from both a behavioral and investigative perspective. It involves reviewing and assessing the facts of a criminal act, interpreting offender behavior, and interaction with the victim, as exhibited during the commission of the crime, or as displayed in the crime scene. BAU staff conduct detailed analyses of crimes for the purpose of providing two or more of the following services: crime analysis, investigative suggestions, profiles of unknown offenders, threat analysis, critical incident analysis, interview strategies, major case management, search warrant assistance, prosecution and trial strategies, and expert testimony. In addition to the above services, the BAU staff produced the Child Abduction Response Plan to assist investigators faced with these investigations. Recently, the BAU released "The School Shooter: A Threat Assessment Perspective" report to guide school administrators, teachers, parents, and law enforcement in identifying and evaluating threats in schools. The BAU maintains a reference file for experts in various forensic disciplines such as odontology, anthropology, psychiatry, entomology, or pathology.

== Criticism ==
In order to generate profiles of offenders, members of the BAU use a concept known as psychological profiling. Belief in psychological profiling has often been supported by anecdotal evidence describing BAU profiles as a necessary key to solving a crime. A homeless man in North Carolina, for example, was apprehended after a BAU profile was issued for a case that the local police force had not been able to solve. Although anecdotal evidence such as this abounds in popular media, the concept of psychological profiling has not been empirically proven.

In a number of studies, professional criminal profilers have been compared to other groups such as students, police officers, and clinical psychologists. In order to evaluate these groups, each participant was presented with the details of a previously solved crime. The profile written by the participant was then compared to a profile of the guilty party. In no study did the group of profilers outperform the other groups, and in some studies, they were clearly outperformed by both police officers and chemistry students.

Despite these findings, members of the BAU continue to use psychological profiling. Public confidence in psychological profiling is also high and has been greatly promoted by TV shows such as Criminal Minds. Some forensic psychologists, such as Robert Homant, have also dismissed the previously mentioned studies by stating that they lack external validity as they do not accurately represent the situations in which members of the BAU work.
