= MCCU =

MCCU may refer to:

- Marylebone Cricket Club Universities British cricket academies
- Major Case Coordination Unit, a component of the U.S. Federal Bureau of Investigation working under the Criminal Investigative Division (CID)
