= DSAC =

DSAC can stand for:

- Domestic Security Alliance Council, a U.S. governmental/corporate organization
- Defence Scientific Advisory Council, a UK independent scientific advisory committee
- Deep Space Atomic Clock, an atomic clock for precise radio navigation in deep space
- Department of Sports, Arts and Culture, a South Africa government department
