= FBI Special Weapons and Tactics Teams =

Specialized tactical teams of the U.S. FBI

- Active: 1973 – present
- Country: United States
- Agency: Federal Bureau of Investigation
- Type: SWAT

Structure
- Full time team members: 26
- Part time team members: 1,073
- Teams: 56 (field offices)

FBI Special Weapons and Tactics (FBI SWAT) Teams are specialized part-time SWAT teams of the Federal Bureau of Investigation (FBI). The FBI maintains SWAT teams at each of its 56 field offices throughout the United States. Each team is composed of a varying number of certified SWAT operators, dependent on office size and funding.

In 2022, SWAT teams had approximately 1,600 callouts.

== History ==
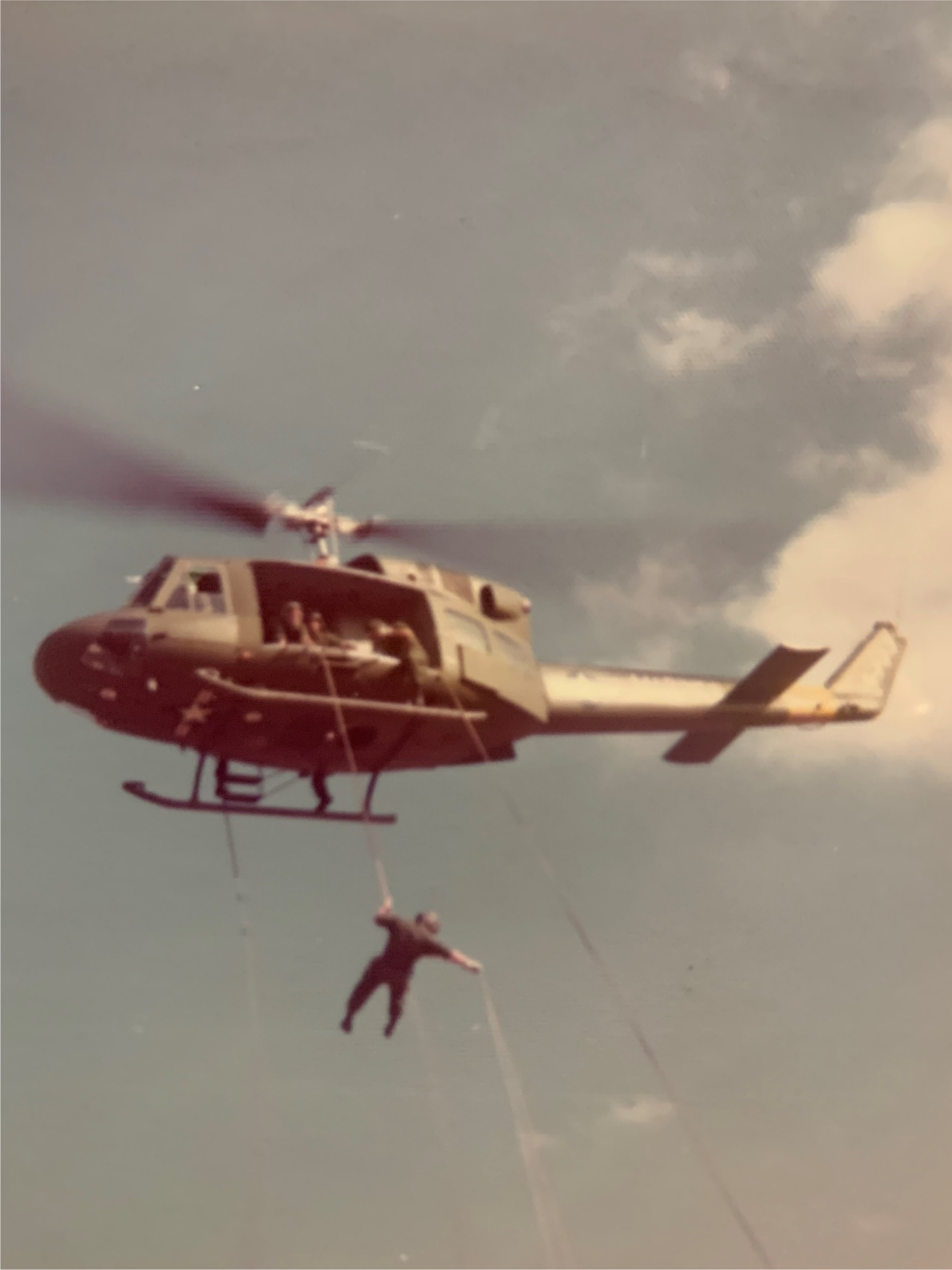
FBI SWAT operators rappelling from a helicopter in 1974

Following the Wounded Knee Occupation in 1973, the FBI established a SWAT program. In the summer of 1973, six field offices Albuquerque, Denver, Kansas City, Omaha, Phoenix and Washington, established SWAT teams of five members. The teams went to the FBI Academy at Quantico to train for a few weeks with the FBI Firearms Training Unit and also spent some time with military Special Forces.

== Roles ==
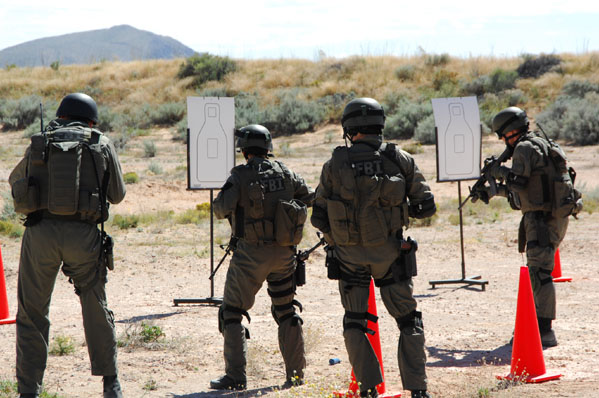
FBI SWAT operators conducting target shooting training

FBI SWAT teams are specially trained to serve warrants and intervene in high-risk incidents such as active shooters, barricaded suspects, or protection for personnel or dignitaries.

FBI SWAT teams are trained to a national standard and utilize the same equipment which enables a team to provide assistance to another Field Office Team. SWAT teams can be dispatched to aid local law enforcement with limited resources to manage large-scale high-risk incidents.

Several factors can determine the deployment of FBI SWAT. Some of those factors are:

- The potential of violence
- The potential risk to law enforcement and the public
- The location of the warrant service and case requirements

== SWAT Operations Unit ==
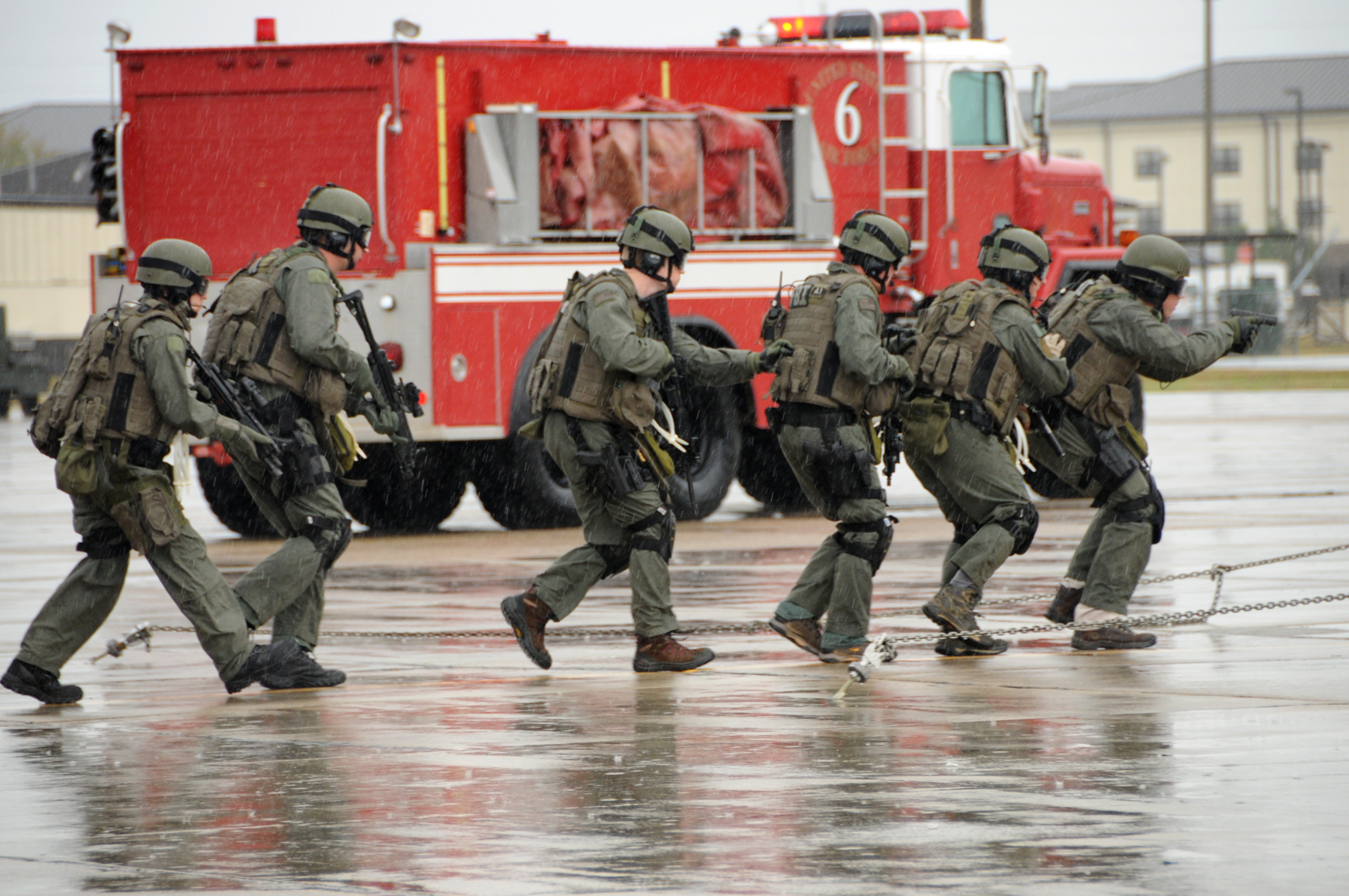
An FBI SWAT team advancing during an aircraft hijacking training exercise at Keesler Air Force Base in Mississippi

The SWAT Operations Unit (SOU), part of the Critical Incident Response Group, oversees the FBI SWAT program. The SOU is responsible for developing standardized training, procedures and tactics, and for research and development including equipment, for the SWAT teams to ensure interoperability for multiple-office deployments. During multiple-office deployments the SOU provides planning assistance and oversight.

Candidates for SWAT teams have to pass selection which includes fitness and marksmanship assessments. SWAT selectees then have to complete a ten-day course over 10 weeks known as the New Operator Training School (NOTS) after which they are able to serve on a SWAT team, but not on every aspect of operations, such as room entries. After a probationary period that may last six to eighteen months, the new team members are sent to SWAT Basic, a three week course at the FBI Training Academy in Quantico for full certification. SWAT teams train on average 32 hours a month.

== Enhanced SWAT teams ==
Nine FBI SWAT teams are designated as "Enhanced" SWAT teams and are specially trained to be able to assist/augment the full-time national Hostage Rescue Team if needed. Enhanced SWAT teams are typically located at larger field offices and comprise a larger number of personnel than standard teams, in addition to having increased access to additional tactical equipment and methods.

== Equipment ==
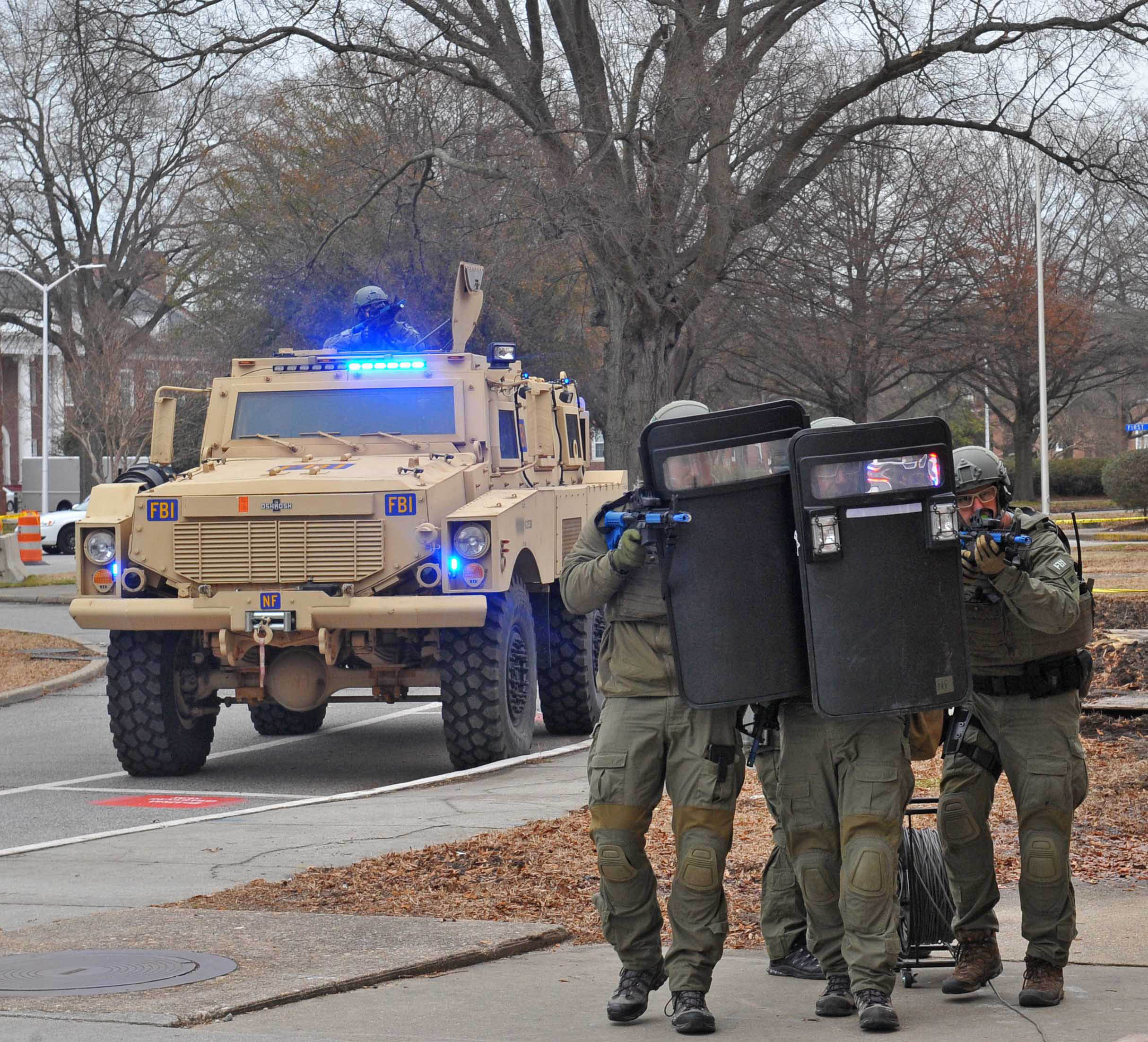
FBI SWAT operators alongside an MRAP during a counterterrorism training exercise at Naval Station Norfolk

=== Weapons ===
FBI SWAT is known to use the Remington 870, various Glock models (17 Gen4, 19M, 20), SIG Sauer P226, and Springfield Armory 1911 Professional Custom. SWAT uses Colt M4 carbines which have replaced the Heckler & Koch MP5/10. Sniper rifles include the H-S Precision .308 rifle which replaced the Remington 700 rifle.

FBI SWAT also uses ballistic shields, stun grenades, enforcer battering rams, sledgehammers, Halligan bars, and gas masks, among other equipment.

=== Vehicles ===
FBI SWAT uses a variety of armored SWAT vehicles, including the Lenco BearCat, Humvee, various MRAP models such as the Oshkosh Alpha, and occasionally tracked armored personnel carriers. A variety of civilian-style vehicles are also used when necessary (such as to avoid attention), often unmarked SUVs, vans, or pickup trucks produced by subsidiaries of Ford, General Motors, and Stellantis.
