= Law enforcement and the Occupy movement =

The Occupy movement has been met with a variety of responses from local police departments since its beginning in 2011. According to documents obtained by the Partnership for Civil Justice Fund, the FBI, state and local law enforcement officials treated the movement as a potential criminal and terrorist threat and used fusion centers and counterterrorism agents to investigate and monitor the Occupy movement.

== Pepperspraying at Occupy Wall Street - September 24 ==
External videos
- Footage of first incident
- Footage of the second incident

At least 80 arrests were made on September 24, Videos which showed several penned-in female demonstrators being hit with pepper spray by a police official were widely disseminated, sparking controversy. That police official was identified as Deputy Inspector Anthony Bologna. After an investigation, Deputy Inspector Bologna, who makes an annual salary of $154,000, was transferred to a different station, and lost two weeks vacation time over the incident.

Public attention to the pepper-sprayings resulted in a spike of news media coverage, a pattern that was to be repeated in the coming weeks following confrontations with police. Clyde Haberman described the resultant public attention as a "big boost" that was "vital" for the still nascent Occupy movement.

== Wounded veteran at Occupy Oakland - October 25 ==
External videos
- "Occupy Oakland video: Riot police fire tear gas, flashbang grenades." Oakland police fire tear gas against protesters. Oct. 25. Scott Olsen can be seen being evacuated at :58—1:23.
- "Occupy Oakland video: Interview with Scott Olsen About His Injury from the Police Attack on October 25th, 2011." Scott Olsen discusses the events of Oct 25, his injuries, and the Oakland police department investigation

On October 25, 2011, Scott Olsen, a 24-year-old Iraq War veteran suffered a skull fracture caused by a projectile that witnesses believed was a tear gas or smoke canister fired by the police. A video by protesters shows the explosion of what appears to be a flash-bang device thrown by one officer near protesters attempting to aid Olsen. The Associated Press later reported that it was not known exactly what kind of object had struck Olsen or who had thrown or fired it, but that protesters had been throwing rocks and bottles. Olsen was rushed to the hospital by other protesters, who were fired upon with unknown police projectiles while attempting to aid him. Doctors said that he was in critical condition. Scott Olsen has since undergone brain surgery. At least two other protesters were injured. No officers have been disciplined over the incident.

The American Civil Liberties Union and National Lawyers Guild called for an investigation into the use of excessive force.

== Multiple incidents at Occupy Oakland - Nov 2/3 ==
=== Videographer shooting ===
External videos
- "Shot by police with rubber bullet at Occupy Oakland"

Shortly before 1 am on November 3, Oakland resident Scott Campbell was shot by police using a less-lethal round while he was filming a stationary line of police in riot gear, hours after the 2011 Oakland general strike. The apparently unprovoked shooting was documented by the resulting point-of-view video from Campbell's own camera.

=== Veteran beaten ===
External videos
- "Iraq war veteran Kayvan Sabehgi beaten by a police officer"

Kayvan Sabeghi, a 32-year-old local business owner and former U.S. Army Ranger, was hit with a baton numerous times by a police officer then arrested on the evening of November 2, 2011. While in police custody, he complained of severe pain and asked for medical treatment but was transferred to a hospital only after 14–18 hours of imprisonment. Sabeghi underwent emergency surgery for a ruptured spleen and remained in the intensive care unit.

=== Journalist Arrested ===
Susie Cagle, a journalist, was arrested while wearing an Alternet press badge at the protests and was detained for 14 hours.

=== Badge covered ===
On the November 2 protests, Officer John Hargraves was filmed having placed black tape over his name on his police uniform. When questioned by a civilian, Officer Hargraves refused to respond. The civilian then spoke with Lt. Clifford Wong, one of several nearby officers. Lt. Wong approached Officer Hargraves and silently removed the tape from the officer's uniform.

Internal Affairs Division learned of the events on November 4 and began an investigation."Deliberate concealment of a badge or name plate" is a Class I offense, the most serious classification. As a result, Officer Hargraves was ordered suspended for 30 days, but has remained on the job pending a disciplinary appeal. "Failure to report others who commit any Class I offense" is also a Class I Offense. Lt. Wong was demoted to the rank of Sergeant.

In January 2012, a US District Court described the events as "the most serious level of misconduct" and noted that it is a crime for officers to conceal their names or badge numbers. The District Court is considering further sanctions against the involved officers.

Additionally, the District Court has stripped the Oakland Police Department of some of its independence, with a potential eye towards placing the Oakland Police under the control of a federal receivership.

== Incident at UC Berkeley - Nov 9 ==
External videos
- Police response to Occupy Cal protesters, Nov 9

On November 9, 2011, students and professors at UC Berkeley participated in a series of "teach-outs" around campus, a noon rally and march. Approximately 1,500 demonstrators attended the days' events. The march route included a Bank of America location adjacent to campus. Not long after demonstrators set up seven tents in front of Upper Sproul Plaza in the mid-afternoon, law enforcement officials from UC Berkeley Police, the Alameda County Sheriff's Office and other UC Police officers in riot gear arrived to remove the tents. Protesters linked arms to form a human chain in front of the tents to prevent officers from dismantling the encampment. Police used 36-inch riot batons to "jab" and push back the protesters and to break the human chain.

Video footage of the afternoon confrontation shows police using batons and dragging two protesters by the hair, one of whom was UC Berkeley English professor Celeste Langan. 39 protesters, including Professor Langan, were arrested for charges including "resisting and delaying a police officer in the performance of their duties and failure to disperse when given a dispersal order." Robert Hass, a UC Berkeley professor of poetry and former United States Poet Laureate, wrote about the police response in a November 19 New York Times opinion piece entitled "Poet-Bashing Police":

the deputies in the cordon surged forward and, using their clubs as battering rams, began to hammer at the bodies of the line of students. It was stunning to see. They swung hard into their chests and bellies. Particularly shocking to me — it must be a generational reaction — was that they assaulted both the young men and the young women with the same indiscriminate force. If the students turned away, they pounded their ribs. If they turned further away to escape, they hit them on their spines.

Hass himself was hit in the ribs by a police officer wielding a baton. His wife Brenda Hillman was shoved to the ground by a police officer.

== Pepperspraying at Occupy Seattle - November 15 ==
External videos
- "Pepper sprayed in the face by the police at #OccupySeattle"

On November 15, a march commenced from the Seattle Central Community College campus to Belltown. At one point during the march, a 17-year-old female swung a stick at an officer. After officers moved in to arrest the female the officers were hindered in their efforts, after issuing an order to disperse the officers deployed pepper spray to move subjects away from them so they could arrest the female suspect. Police were filmed spraying the crowd of people with pepper spray. It was reported that the victims included "a 4-foot 10-inch, 84-year-old woman, a priest and a woman, Jennifer Fox, who claimed the pepper spray led to a miscarriage." The 84-year-old woman, Dorli Rainey, is a former mayoral candidate and retired school teacher who has been active in City government on education and transportation issues since the 1960s. That night, Rainey was en route to City Hall to attend a scheduled meeting of the Seattle City Council's Transportation Committee. Rainey had served on the school board, and in the 1970s ran for a seat on King County Council. In 2009, Rainey, then 82 years old, made a brief run for Seattle Mayor before withdrawing from the race citing her age: "I am old and should learn to be old, stay home, watch TV and sit still." However, regarding the possible miscarriage by Jennifer Fox, doubts have been cast on the truth of her claim.

Dorli Rainey was notably photographed as she was being carried away by friends after having been hit with the police's chemical spray.

== Pepperspraying at Occupy UC Davis - November 18 ==
External media

Images
- Brian Nguyen's flickr set (The California Aggie)

Video
- Cops Pepper Spray Passive Protesters (Associated Press)

On November 18, UC Davis Police arrived wearing riot gear at 3:30 pm and began removing tents and arresting demonstrators obstructing the removal of tents. A group of demonstrators staged a sit-in on the walkway in the quad, linking arms together and refusing to move. Students began surrounding campus police officers and demanded release of the detained protesters in return for letting the officers leave. Campus police officers asked the demonstrators to move several times, but the students refused.

Sometime around 4:00 pm, two officers began spraying pepper spray directly in the faces of the sitting students. Bystanders recorded the incident with cell phone cameras, while members of the crowd chanted "Shame on you" and "Let them go" at the police officers. Eleven protesters received medical treatment; two were hospitalized.

According to university officials, the officers felt like they were surrounded by the demonstrators. One of the officers who used pepper spray on the students was identified as Lieutenant John Pike. Ten arrests were made. Arrestees were "cited and released on misdemeanor charges of unlawful assembly and failure to disperse". Police began to leave the area around 4:10 pm as more students began to arrive.

Lieutenant John Pike and another unnamed UC Davis Police officer were placed on administrative leave shortly after the incident. UC Davis Police Chief Annette Spicuzza was later placed on leave as well.

== Mass Arrest at Oakland - January 28 ==
On January 28, 2012, Oakland Police arrested over 400 people, including at least six journalists. One of the imprisoned journalist emerged after 20 hours of imprisonment and reported witnessing police brutality and cruel treatment. charges were dropped for virtually all of the 400 arrested individuals.

The National Lawyers Guild of Northern California alleges a number of human rights abuses, including hundreds of unlawful arrests, physical assaults. The guild claims that many imprisoned protestors were being denied counsel or being denied medical care or medications.

== Stun gun use at Occupy DC - January 30 ==
External videos
- "Police tase innocent protester"

On January 30, US Park Police were filmed using a stun gun several times during an arrest at Occupy DC. The man had been arrested for removing eviction notices, and tazed after resisting arrest.

== Police Raid at Occupy Buffer Zone in Cyprus - April 6, 2012 ==
External videos
- Police attacking crowd outside Occupy Buffer Zone, April 6

On April 6, 2012, strong police force from the Republic of Cyprus gathered in the area occupied by the activists and raided the occupied buildings at around 10:15pm. The operation included the anti-terrorist department and the anti-drug department of the police force. Policemen, equipped with guns, helmets and batons smashed the door and entered the building. A sequence of screaming and sounds of smashing and breaking followed. The police reported that it made 28 arrests, including 11 minors and that it had confiscated 1 gram of cannabis.

The police was reported to have used excessive and unjustified violence in the operation. Eyewitnesses reported that the police repeatedly hit a 24-year-old woman, "causing a massive bump to her forehead, as well as multiple cuts and bruises". Reports were also made of sexual assault on a 19-year-old woman, the beating of two activists that were arrested in the building, and for unjustified violence on the crowd of activists and passers by that had gathered outside the building.
