= FBI Critical Incident Response Group =

US FBI special crisis unit

Critical Incident Response Group
- Active: 1994–present (30–31 years)
- Country: United States
- Agency: Federal Bureau of Investigation
- Part of: Criminal, Cyber, Response, and Services Branch
- Headquarters: J. Edgar Hoover Building; Washington, D.C.
- Abbreviation: CIRG

Commanders
- Current commander: Assistant Director Paul H. Haertel

The Critical Incident Response Group (CIRG) is a division of the Criminal, Cyber, Response, and Services Branch of the United States Federal Bureau of Investigation (FBI). CIRG enables the FBI to rapidly respond to, and effectively manage, special crisis incidents in the United States.

== History ==
In response to public outcry over the standoffs at Ruby Ridge, Idaho, and of the Branch Davidians in the Waco siege, the FBI formed the CIRG in 1994 to deal with crisis situations more efficiently. The CIRG is designated to formulate strategies, manage hostage or siege situations, and if possible resolve them "without loss of life", as pledged in a 1995 Senate hearing by FBI director Louis Freeh, who assumed the post four-and-a-half months after the Waco Siege.

CIRG was intended to integrate tactical and investigative resources and expertise for critical incidents which necessitate an immediate response from law enforcement authorities. CIRG will deploy investigative specialists to respond to terrorist activities, hostage takings, child abductions and other high-risk repetitive violent crimes. Other major incidents include prison riots, bombings, air and train crashes, and natural disasters.

== Organization ==
Each of the major areas of CIRG furnishes distinctive operational assistance and training to FBI field offices as well as state, local and international law enforcement agencies.

- Surveillance and Aviation Section – Provides aviation and surveillance support for all facets of FBI investigative activities with a priority on protecting the United States from terrorist attack and against foreign intelligence operations and espionage.
  - Aviation Surveillance Branch
    - Aviation Support Unit
    - Special Flight Operations Unit
    - Field Flight Operations Unit
  - Mobile Surveillance Branch
    - Mobile Surveillance Teams-Armed (MST-A)
    - Mobile Surveillance Teams (MST)
- Tactical Section – Provides the FBI with a nationwide, three-tiered tactical resolution capability that upon proper authorization can be activated within four hours of notification to address a full spectrum of terrorist or criminal matters.
  - Operations and Training Unit
  - Hostage Rescue Team
  - SWAT Operations Unit
  - Special Weapons and Tactics Teams
  - Crisis Negotiation Unit
  - Tactical Helicopter Unit
  - Operational Support Unit
- Investigative and Operations Support Section – Prepares for and responds to critical incidents, major investigations, and special events by providing expertise in behavioral and crime analysis, crisis management, and rapid deployment logistics.
  - National Center for the Analysis of Violent Crime
    - Behavioral Analysis Unit
    - Violent Criminal Apprehension Program
  - Crisis Management Unit
  - Rapid Deployment and Logistics
- Strategic Information and Operation Center – Serves as the FBI's 24-hour clearinghouse for strategic information, and as the center for crisis management and special event monitoring.
- Counter-IED Section – Provides training, equipment, and advanced technical support to prevent and effectively respond to terrorist or criminal use of hazardous devices explosives and weapons of mass destruction.
- Critical Incident Intelligence Unit – Provides intelligence to inform operational planning and strategic decision-making.
