= FBI Crisis Negotiation Unit =

FBI negotiator unit

Crisis Negotiation Unit
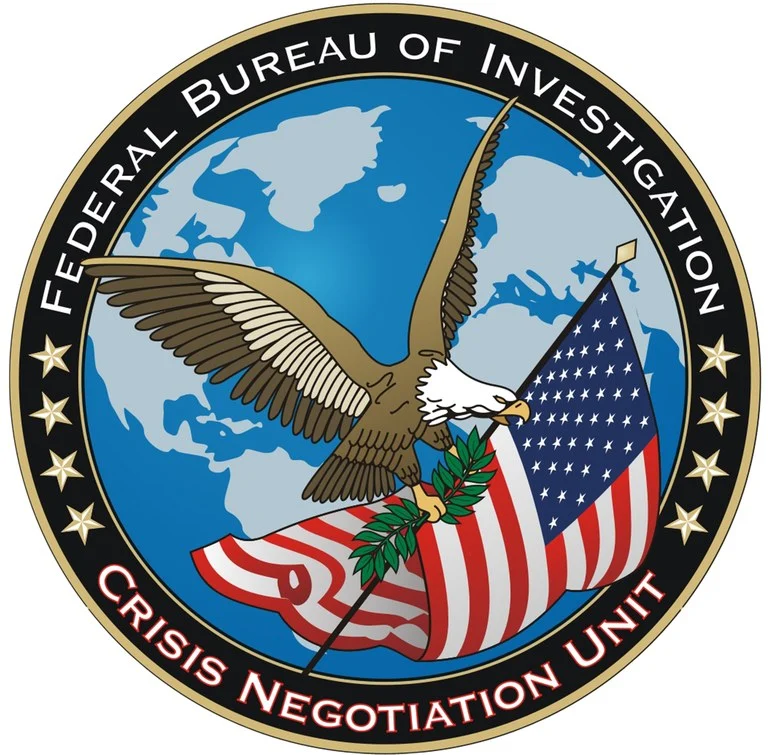
- Active: 1974 - present
- Country: United States
- Agency: Federal Bureau of Investigation
- Type: Negotiation
- Role: Crisis negotiation; Counter-terrorism
- Part of: Operational Support Branch; Critical Incident Response Group
- Motto: Pax per colloquium Resolution through dialogue
- Abbreviation: CNU

Structure
- Crisis negotiators: Approx. 340

The FBI Crisis Negotiation Unit (CNU) is the part of the Operational Support Branch of the Critical Incident Response Group responsible for the FBI's Crisis Negotiation Program. The mission of the CNU is fourfold, consisting of operations, training, research and program management.

== Activities ==
The CNU maintains an immediate – 24 hours a day, 7 days a week – operational response capability to conduct and manage on-scene negotiations during any significant crisis event worldwide in which the FBI is involved. The FBI becomes involved internationally when the victim is a U.S. citizen or there are demands made against the U.S. government. As part of this mission, negotiators deploy overseas to assist in kidnapping situations involving U.S. citizens.

The FBI is considered the negotiation arm of the United States government for international incidents. Since 1990, the CNU has been involved in over 300 such incidents worldwide. CNU negotiators also routinely provide telephonic assistance to both FBI field negotiators and domestic police negotiators during domestic crisis situations.

The FBI has approximately 340 crisis negotiators in the 56 field offices. The CNU is responsible for managing these assets and providing whatever training and equipment is necessary for the field office negotiators to successfully resolve crisis situations.

The CNU is staffed by a Unit Chief, five Supervisory Special Agents and four support staff. The unit is based with all other Critical Incident Response Group units at the FBI Academy in Quantico, Virginia. The CNU has adopted the Latin phrase pax per conloquium, "resolution through dialogue," as its motto.

== Training ==
The CNU is responsible for the initial training of all FBI negotiators, which includes a two-week national negotiation course conducted at the FBI Academy. The unit also provides advanced and periodic update training to FBI and other law enforcement negotiators at the FBI Academy, regionally and internationally. Exchange programs are in place with British, Canadian, Australian, Israeli, Irish, German and South African law enforcement agencies. The CNU also provides crisis negotiation concepts to FBI decision-makers and selected law enforcement managers in appropriate forums.

== Initiatives ==
The CNU is engaged in an array of research projects, case studies and other initiatives targeted at expanding the FBI's capabilities to assess, manage and successfully resolve critical events. An integral part of this research effort is the Law Enforcement Negotiation Support (LENS) System. LENS is a computer-based project developed to provide all law enforcement negotiators with additional tools to help resolve crisis situations.

Part of this effort is a research project known as the Hostage Barricade Database System (HOBAS). HOBAS was undertaken to gather and analyze statistics on hostage, barricade, and/or suicide incidents in the United States. There are currently over 5,000 incidents in HOBAS, contributed by law enforcement agencies in the U.S. and Canada.

The CNU is available to assist any law enforcement negotiator with operational issues around the clock, seven days a week.

== Notable alumni ==
- Gary Noesner author of Stalling For Time.
- Chris Voss author of Never Split The Difference, adjunct professor at Georgetown University's McDonough School of Business, CEO at the Black Swan Group Ltd.
