= Crisis negotiation =

Law enforcement technique

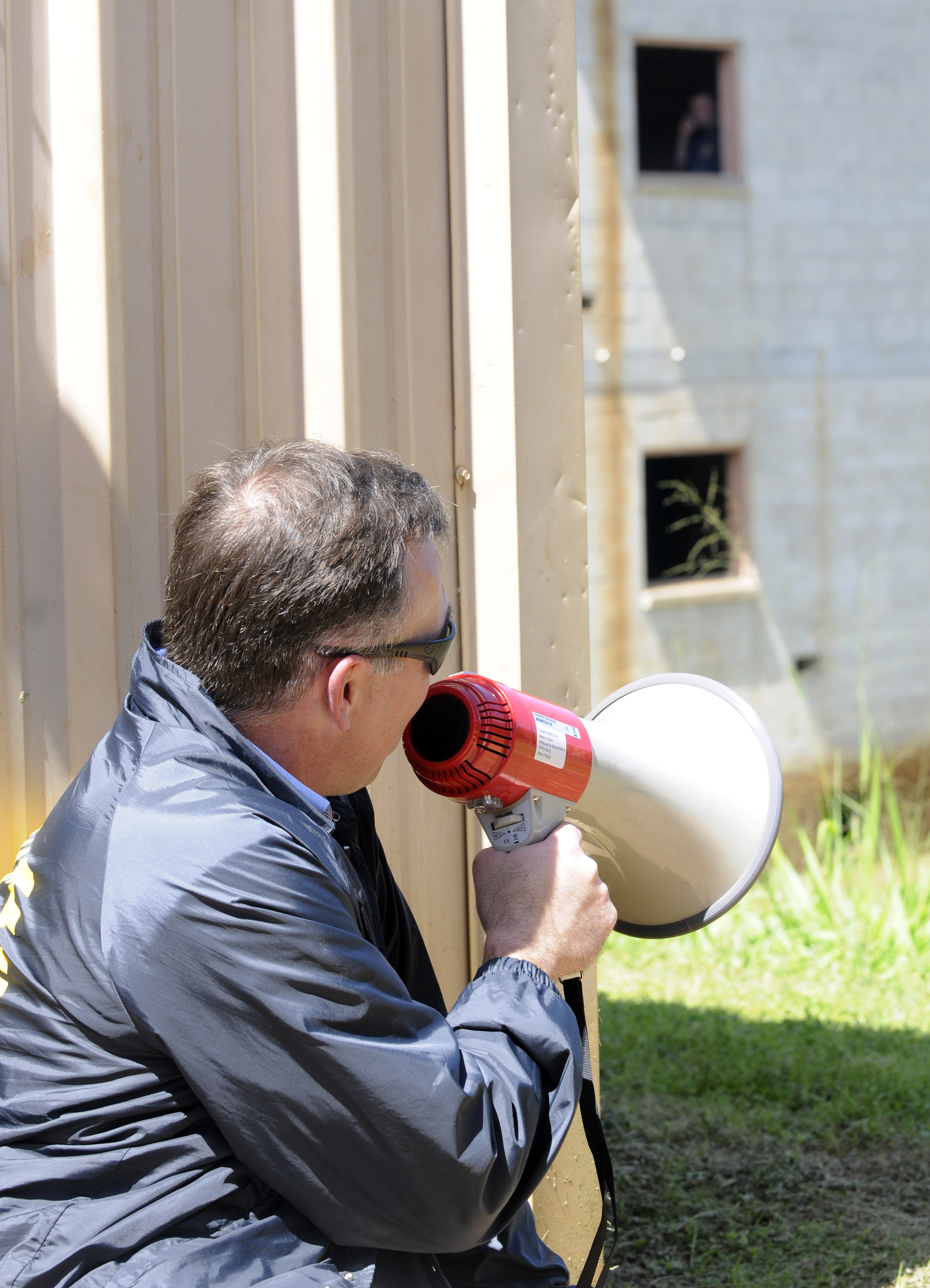
A United States Army Criminal Investigation Division agent using a megaphone to negotiate the safe release of hostages during a hostage-taking training exercise

Crisis negotiation is a law enforcement technique used to communicate with people who are threatening violence (workplace violence, domestic violence, suicide, or terrorism), including barricaded subjects, stalkers, criminals attempting to escape or evade arrest, and hostage-takers. Crisis negotiation is often initiated by the first officer(s) on the scene.

== History ==
Modern hostage negotiation principles were established in 1972 when New York City Police Department detective Harvey Schlossberg, also a psychologist, recognized the need for trained personnel in crisis intervention. Schlossberg had worked on the David Berkowitz ("Son of Sam") case, and had instituted other psychological principles in police work, including psychological screening of police applicants. Schlossberg's negotiation strategies were used during the 1973 Brooklyn hostage crisis and were crucial in ensuring the peaceful resolution of the standoff.

The first hostage negotiators were often deployed as elements of police tactical units and merely created a diversion while they deployed. In modern usage, while sometimes acting independently, hostage negotiation teams are often deployed in conjunction with police tactical units, with the tactical teams only sent in should negotiations fail.

The Federal Bureau of Investigation Crisis Negotiation Unit (which developed the Behavioral Change Stairway Model) and Singapore Police Force Crisis Negotiation Unit are examples of specialized units trained in these techniques.

== Behavioral Change Stairway Model ==
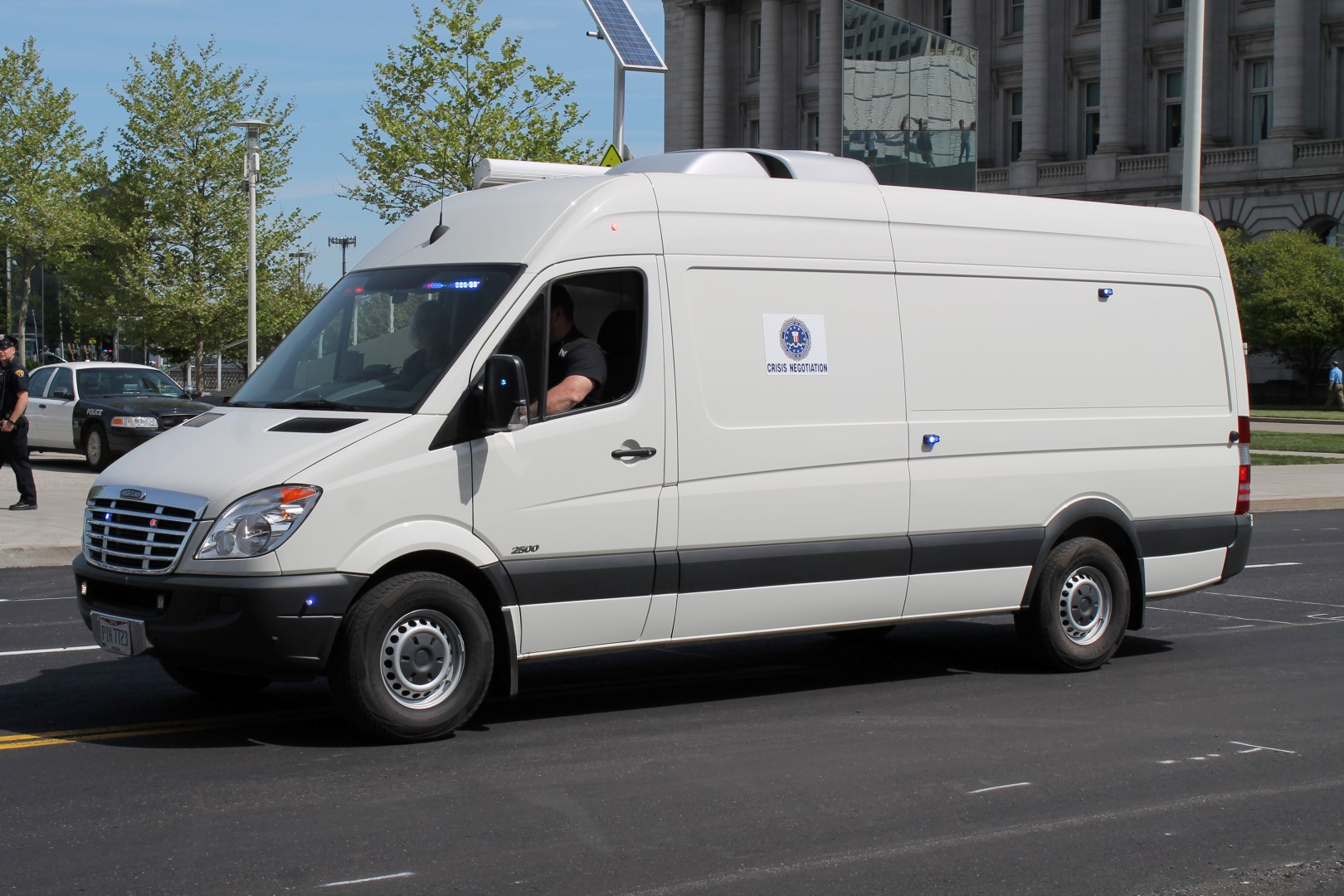
A Mercedes-Benz Sprinter used by the Federal Bureau of Investigation's Crisis Negotiation Unit

One specific model developed by the FBI is the Behavioral Change Stairway Model. Police negotiators that follow this model work through the following stages in order:

1. Active Listening: Understand the psychology of the perpetrator and let them know they are being listened to.
2. Empathy: Understand their issues and how they feel.
3. Rapport: When they begin to see how the negotiator feels, they are building trust.
4. Influence: Only once trust has been gained can solutions to their problem be recommended.
5. Behavioral Change: They act, and maybe surrender.

It is considered to be important to work through these steps in order, and not to try to effect behavioral change before rapport has been established.
