= Black Identity Extremists =

Former FBI designation for allegedly violent African-American activists

In the United States, Black Identity Extremists was a designation used by the Federal Bureau of Investigation (FBI) from August 2017 to July 2019. It first appeared in a counterterrorism report dated August 3, 2017 sent to thousands of American police departments and described safety concerns about allegedly violent African-American activists. The term was discontinued when the FBI merged several classifications under the umbrella term of “racially motivated violent extremism”.

== Definition ==
According to documents obtained by The Young Turks, a 2018/2019 "Threat Guidance" defined Black Identity Extremists as people who "use force or violence in violation of criminal law in response to perceived racism and injustice in society". The FBI files also claim that one of the motives was "establishing a separate black homeland or autonomous black social institutions, communities or governing organizations within the USA."

== Reactions ==
The term first received media attention in October 2017 when Foreign Policy published a leaked copy of the report in October 2017. According to Foreign Policy, the report is the first reference to "black identity extremists", while also noting the report claims "[t]he FBI assesses it is very likely Black Identity Extremist perceptions of police brutality against African Americans spurred an increase in premeditated, retaliatory lethal violence against law enforcement and will very likely serve as justification for such violence". However, former government officials and legal experts claimed the term described a movement that did not exist.

Civil liberties organizations and political commentators expressed concern that the internal use of this designation by the FBI's counter-terrorism unit signals a politically-motivated effort to label black activism, such as the Black Lives Matter movement, as equivalent to white supremacists.

In November 2017, the National Organization of Black Law Enforcement Executives, the nation's largest black police group, stated that the FBI designation was "ill advised."

In March 2018, the term was discussed during a sitting of the Congressional Black Caucus.

According to the ACLU, documents leaked by The Young Turks show that a program called IRON FIST continued to investigate Black activists, even though the label "Black Identity Extremist" was no longer used. The label was retired after objections that it inappropriately assigned a group or organizational identity without sufficient evidence to show that such a group actually existed. It has not dismantled other surveillance programs like IRON FIST, leading to criticism that the Federal government has neglected the threat posed by white supremacists to focus on targeting Black people.

== See also ==
- COINTELPRO
- Black supremacy
