= Child Abduction and Serial Murder Investigative Resources Center =

US government agency

The Morgan P. Hardiman Child Abduction and Serial Murder Investigative Resources Center (CASMIRC) is a unit of the FBI's National Center for the Analysis of Violent Crime (NCAVC) that provides resources, advice, and training to local agencies working on cases of missing, kidnapped, or murdered children and serial murders. Congress established CASMIRC as part of Public Law 1998 section 105-314–the Protection of Children From Sexual Predators Act–aiming to reduce crime involving child abductions, mysterious disappearances of children, child homicide, and serial murder.

== Goals ==
CASMIRC has been charged with accomplishing the following goals:

- Improve the investigation of major violent crimes through the establishment and coordination of CASMIRC with federal, state and local authorities;
- Provide, if requested by a federal, state, or local law enforcement agency, on-site consultation and advice;
- Establish a centralized repository based upon case data reflecting child abductions, mysterious disappearances of children, child homicides, and serial murder submitted by state and local agencies;
- Increase the efficiency of the FBI's NCAVC as an operational entity designed to provide operational support functions to any law enforcement agency confronted with a child abduction, mysterious disappearance of a child, child homicide, or serial murder;
- Improve the behaviorally based operational support services provided by the FBI in an attempt to reduce incidents of violent crime;
- Identify and prioritize those areas of research necessary to address existing and emerging violent crime problems in the areas of child abductions, mysterious disappearances of a child, child homicide, and serial murder; and,
- Provide, in coordination with the National Center for Missing and Exploited Children and the Office of Juvenile Justice and Delinquency Prevention, appropriate training to federal, state, and local law enforcement in matters regarding child abductions, mysterious disappearances of children, and child homicides.
