= National Center for the Analysis of Violent Crime =

Specialist FBI department

- Active: June 21, 1984 - Present
- Country: United States
- Agency: Federal Bureau of Investigation
- Part of: Investigative and Operations Support Section
- Location: FBI Academy
- Abbreviation: NCAVC

Structure
- Subunits: Behavioral Analysis Unit; Child Abduction and Serial Murder Investigative Resources Center; Violent Criminal Apprehension Program

The National Center for the Analysis of Violent Crime (NCAVC) is a specialist FBI department. The NCAVC's role is to coordinate investigative and operational support functions, criminological research, and training in order to provide assistance to federal, state, local, and foreign law enforcement agencies investigating unusual or repetitive violent crimes (serial crimes).

The NCAVC also provides investigative support through expertise and consultation in non-violent matters such as national security, corruption, and white-collar crime investigations. President Reagan gave it the primary mission of "identifying and tracking 'repeat killers'", a term he used for serial killers.

== Founding ==
The NCAVC was conceived in 1981 by FBI agent and offender profiler Robert K Ressler during a conversation with then Quantico director Jim McKenzie. Jim McKenzie ran with the idea and eventually had it realised.

In November 1982, following a meeting between members of the Criminal Personality Research Project advisory board and other specialists, the concept of a single (NCAVC) was put forward. This elite investigative branch was never envisaged as a replacement for traditional crime investigation by local law enforcement agencies. The proposal was unanimously adopted seven months later by a conference held at Sam Houston State University's Center for Criminal Justice in Huntsville, Texas.

The delegates agreed that the NCAVC should be founded at the FBI Academy in Quantico and run by the agents of the Behavioral Science Unit. President Ronald Reagan formally announced the establishment of NCAVC on June 21, 1984.

== Function ==
The NCAVC uses the latest advances in computer and investigative strategies to combat serial and violent crime: ViCAP (Violent Criminal Apprehension Program) and PROFILER (a robot, rule-based expert system programmed to profile serial criminals). CIAP (Criminal Investigative Analysis Programme) is another program designed to investigate serial crime.

VICAP specifically works by identifying and linking the signature aspects in violent serial crimes. The signature of a crime is the intrinsic part of the crime which the criminal must include in order for him to be satisfied (as Ted Bundy would say what the killer must do to "Get his rocks off") and thus is present in every crime committed by the same person (although the signature does evolve over time).

Today, every division in the FBI is mandated to have an NCAVC coordinator also known as a profiling coordinator. The NCAVC or profiling coordinator acts as a liaison to the local law enforcement agencies. Typical cases for which NCAVC services are requested include child abduction or mysterious disappearance of children, serial murders, single homicides, serial rapes, extortions, threats, kidnappings, product tampering, arsons and bombings, weapons of mass destruction, public corruption, and domestic and international terrorism. The operational services of the NCAVC are supported by research and training programs. Requests for NCAVC services are typically facilitated through NCAVC coordinators assigned to each FBI field office.

== Areas of focus ==
The NCAVC is further organized into three components:

- Behavioral Analysis Unit (BAU)- East/West Regions;
- Child Abduction Serial Murder Investigative Resources Center (CASMIRC);
- Violent Criminal Apprehension Program (ViCAP).

== See also ==
- Offender profiling

== Bibliography ==
- Ressler, R. K.; Burgess, A. W.; Douglas, J. E. (1988). Sexual Homicide: Patterns and Motives. New York: Simon and Schuster. pp. 99–120. ISBN 978-0-669-16559-3.
- Ressler, R. K.; Shachtman, T. (2015). Whoever Fights Monsters: My Twenty Years Tracking Serial Killers for the FBI. New York: St. Martin's Publishing Group. ISBN 978-1-250-08499-6.
- Safarik, M. E.; Ressler, R. K. (2010). Lynch, Virginia A.; Duval, Janet B. (eds.). Behavioral Analyses // Forensic Nursing Science. Amsterdam: Elsevier Health Sciences. pp. 80–96. ISBN 978-0-323-06638-9.
