= FBI Criminal, Cyber, Response, and Services Branch =

Crime investigation branch in the US

Criminal, Cyber, Response, and Services Branch
- Country: United States
- Agency: Federal Bureau of Investigation
- Headquarters: J. Edgar Hoover Building; Washington, D.C.
- Abbreviation: CCRSB

Structure
- Subunits: Criminal Investigative Division; Critical Incident Response Group; Cyber Division; International Operations Division; Victim Services Division

Commanders
- Current commander: Executive Assistant Director Timothy Langan

The Criminal, Cyber, Response, and Services Branch (CCRSB) is a service within the Federal Bureau of Investigation (FBI). The CCRSB is responsible for investigating financial crime, white-collar crime, violent crime, organized crime, public corruption, violations of individual civil rights, and drug-related crime. In addition, the Branch also oversees all computer-based crime related to counterterrorism, counterintelligence, and criminal threats against the United States.

== Operation ==
The CCRSB deploys FBI agents, analysts, and computer scientists and uses traditional investigative techniques such as sources and wiretaps, surveillance, and forensics. CCRSB works in conjunction with other federal, state, and regional agencies from 56 field offices and at the National Cyber Investigative Joint Task Force (NCIJTF).

CCRSB operates a 24-hour cyber command center (CyWatch) where they combine the resources of the FBI and NCIJTF. In the event of a significant cyber intrusion, they provide connectivity to federal cyber centers, government agencies, FBI field offices, legal attachés, and the private sector. They also exchange information about cyber threats with the private sector through partnerships such as the Domestic Security Alliance Council, InfraGard, and the National Cyber-Forensics and Training Alliance (NCFTA).

CCRSB maintains overseas legal attaché offices to coordinate cyber investigations and address jurisdictional hurdles and differences in law with other countries while collaborating with cyber crime centers at Interpol and Europol.

The unit maintains a website called Cyber Shield Alliance (www.leo.gov) which provides access to cyber training and information for the public, and the means to report cyber incidents to the FBI.

The FBI reports that since 2002, they have seen an 80 percent increase in the number of computer intrusion investigations.

== Leadership ==
Headed by an FBI executive assistant director, the CCRSB is responsible to the FBI Director through the Deputy Director.

The current CCRSB executive assistant director is Timothy Langan.

== Organization ==
The CCRSB was formed by the unification of the FBI's various traditional crime fighting units.

- FBI Critical Incident Response Group
- FBI Criminal Investigative Division
- FBI Cyber Division
- FBI International Operations Division
- FBI Victim Services Division
