= Eddie Conway =

Black Panther Party leader convicted of killing a police officer (1946–2023)

- Born: Marshall Conway; April 23, 1946; Baltimore, Maryland, U.S.
- Died: February 13, 2023 (aged 76); Long Beach, California, U.S.
- Organization: Black Panther Party
- Criminal charge: Murder
- Criminal penalty: Life (later changed to time served and probation)
- Criminal status: Probation, after serving 43 years and 11 months of imprisonment

Marshall "Eddie" Conway (April 23, 1946 – February 13, 2023) was a leading member of the Baltimore chapter of the Black Panther Party. He was convicted in 1971 for the murder of a police officer. Conway and his supporters considered him a political prisoner. After approximately 44 years of imprisonment, Conway was released on parole in 2014 after an appellate court ruled that his jury had been given improper instructions.

== Background ==
Eddie Conway was born in Baltimore. In addition to his position in the Black Panther Party, Conway was also employed by the United States Postal Service. He was unaware that some of the founding members of the Baltimore chapter of the Party were undercover officers at the Baltimore Police Department who reported daily on his activities at the chapter. At the same time, the Federal Bureau of Investigation had also started its own investigation of Conway, recording his whereabouts, contacting his employers at the Post Office, and maintaining contact with the Baltimore Police Department.

== BPD shooting ==
On the night of April 21, 1970, Baltimore police officers Donald Sager and Stanley Sierakowski were on a domestic disturbance call when they were shot by three assailants who fired at least eight rounds. Sager was killed and Sierakowski was critically wounded. About an hour later, Officers James Welsh and Roger Nolan arrested two men near the scene of the shooting, based on information they received over police radio. The men were Jackie Powell and Jack Ivory Johnson, and two pistols were found near the location where they were hiding. The police determined that these two men were affiliated with the Baltimore chapter of the Black Panther Party or some of its members.

According to Nolan, he briefly chased a black man on foot and tried to make contact with immediately after contact with the two men. The man then fired several shots at Nolan and escaped. Nolan stated that he had previously seen this man on his assigned beat and could recognize him, but he did not know his name. Based on the affiliation of the two suspects with the Black Panther Party, Nolan was shown two photo line-ups of party members. In the first line-up, Nolan said that a picture of Conway, taken seven years earlier in 1963, resembled the shooter. In the second line-up, which used a current photograph of Conway, Nolan positively identified Conway as the individual who had shot at him. Welsh also positively identified Conway as the man whom Nolan had chased.

Conway was arrested the next day while working at the post office. Following an investigation where the ballistics of both shootings were determined to match, Conway was charged with both the murder of Sager and the attempted murders of Sierakowski and Nolan. One of the weapons found with Powell and Johnson was also matched through ballistics testing to the murder of Sager.

Black Panther Party member Jack Ivory Johnson was released from prison in May 2010.

== Trial ==
Conway appealed to the court to be represented by either Charles Garry or William Kunstler, two attorneys who consistently represented party members. Both lawyers had offered their services free of charge. However, the court denied Conway's request and appointed a lawyer who performed no pre-trial investigation and never met with Conway. Therefore, Conway chose to absent himself from much of his January 1971 trial. Conway also requested that his cellmate, attorney Arthur Turco, be appointed to represent him. Turco requested bail to be able to do so, but both of these requests were denied. Conway fired two lawyers, the first (Nelson Kandel) over trial strategy differences and the second one that was appointed to represent him and who Conway refused to cooperate with.

Before the trial, Johnson had confessed to the police, naming Powell and Conway as the ones who shot Officers Sager and Sierakowski. According to court testimony, Johnson stated he fired into the air because "I didn't have the heart to kill the pig." But later, Johnson refused to testify against Conway and said his statement was coerced. The use of the photo line-up was questioned and the reliability of the prison informant was brought up, and the trial taking place just two years after the Baltimore riot of 1968 also brought scrutiny.

The state's case was based partially on photo identification by Nolan. To strengthen its case, the state called Charles Reynolds, a known jailhouse informant. He testified that while he shared a cell with Conway before the trial, Conway confessed to him. However, Conway knew that Reynolds was a known informant and adamantly protested when Reynolds was placed in his cell. The prosecution argued that Reynolds' account was truthful because according to Reynolds, Conway had told him that he had taken Sierakowski's watch. This information was not released by the police during the investigation.

The ballistic evidence connecting the weapons to the murders played a significant role in the trial. The jury convicted Conway of the murder, and both he and Powell were sentenced to life in prison. Both men appealed but the appellate court upheld the convictions.

== Imprisonment ==
During his imprisonment, Conway earned three college degrees, started a literacy program, and was an "exemplary" prisoner. During the entire time, Conway maintained his innocence. Conway's supporters called him one of the country's longest-held political prisoners. While incarcerated, Conway tried to organize prison unions and organized a prison library. Conway described himself as a political prisoner.

In February 2001, the Baltimore City Council passed a resolution urging the Governor of Maryland to pardon Conway, over the strident protests of police officers. Conway wrote a book on his life, Marshall Law: The Life & Times of a Baltimore Black Panther, that was released on April 4, 2011.

== Release ==
After an appellate court ruled that his jury had been given improper instructions, state prosecutors agreed to change his life sentence to time served and probation, and Conway was released from prison on March 4, 2014, after having served 43 years and 11 months.

Conway was later a producer at The Real News and hosted the show Rattling the Bars.

Conway died on February 13, 2023, at the age of 76.
