= Oshkosh Alpha =

Light tactical military vehicle

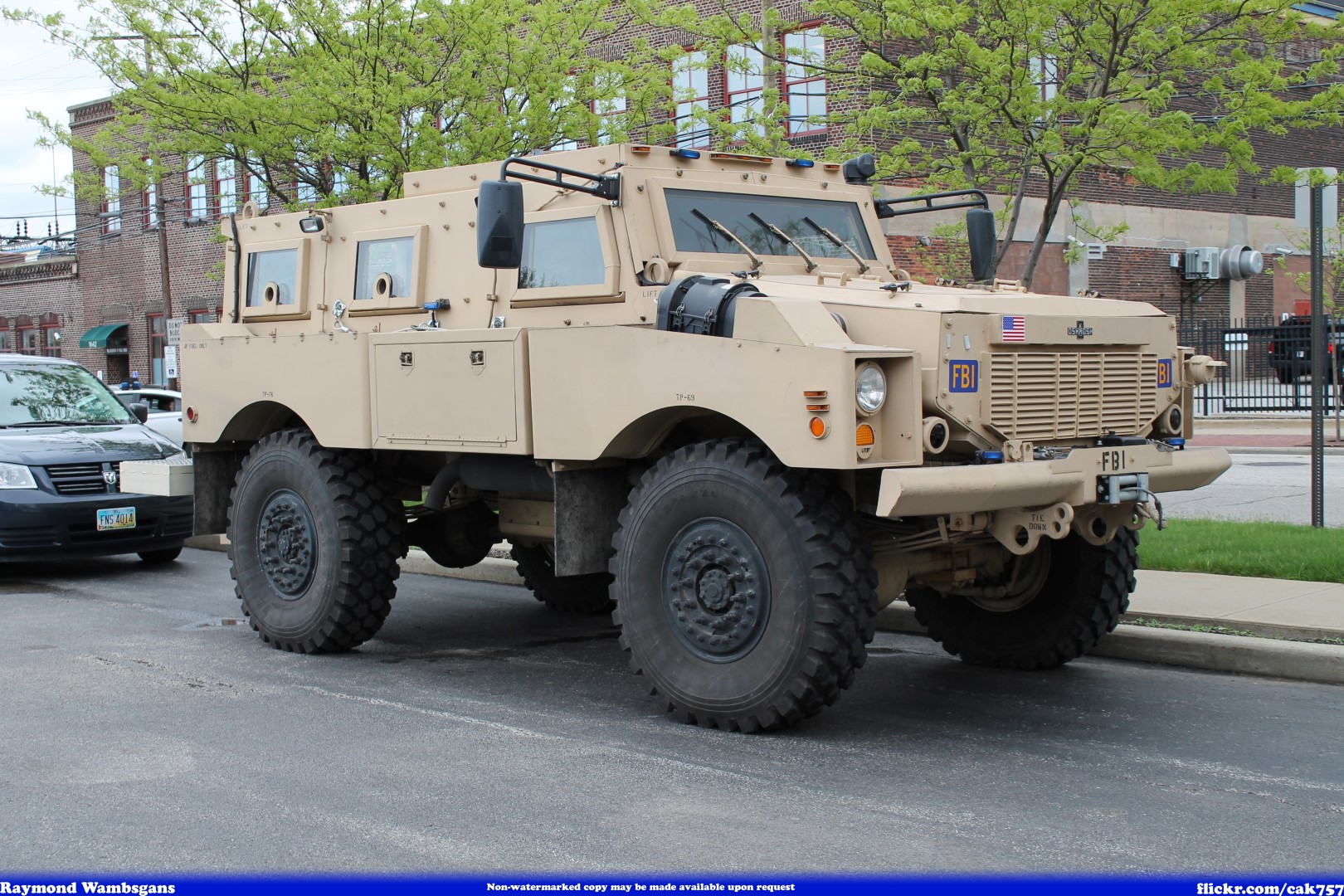
- A parked Oshkosh Alpha MRAP as used by the FBI
- Type: MRAP
- Place of origin: United States

Production history
- Manufacturer: Oshkosh Corporation (Manufacturing); Protected Vehicles Incorporated (Chassis)
- Unit cost: $275,000 (PVI claims) $306,000 (2007)
- Produced: 2007–2009
- No. built: 100

Specifications
- Mass: 13 tonnes (28660 lb)
- Crew: 2 (Crew); 6 (Passengers)
- Main armament: Roof-mounted machine guns or automatic grenade launcher (Optional)
- Engine: Diesel
- Ground clearance: 0.6m (trench); 1.2 m (fording)
- Operational range: 600 km (373 mi)

The Oshkosh Alpha is a Mine-Resistant Ambush Protected (MRAP) vehicle created by Oshkosh Corporation together with Protected Vehicles Incorporated (PVI). It is considered as a Category I MRAP vehicle.

The Alpha was marketed to eventually phase out the use of the Humvee.

== History ==
The Oshkosh Alpha was first revealed to the public in September 12, 2006 at the Modern Day Marine show in Quantico, Virginia with the US Marine Corp Systems Command awarding a contract for 100 Alphas for US$30.6 million. Oshkosh announced on February 26, 2007, that it would supply the MRAPs within 120 days.

During its production, the vehicle was given the codename of Bulldog.

MCSC announced on June 29, 2007, that the contract was cancelled due to design concerns, such as ergonomic and automotive deficiencies as well as questionable vehicle survivability. It is mentioned that the time needed to give the Alpha a redesign would delay future production orders.

As of 2017, Oshkosh has halted sales of the Alpha since PVI went bankrupt in 2007. Most Alphas made prior to the contract being discontinued have been transferred to units of the Federal Bureau of Investigation, the Naval Criminal Investigative Service and the U.S. Customs and Border Protection.

== Design ==
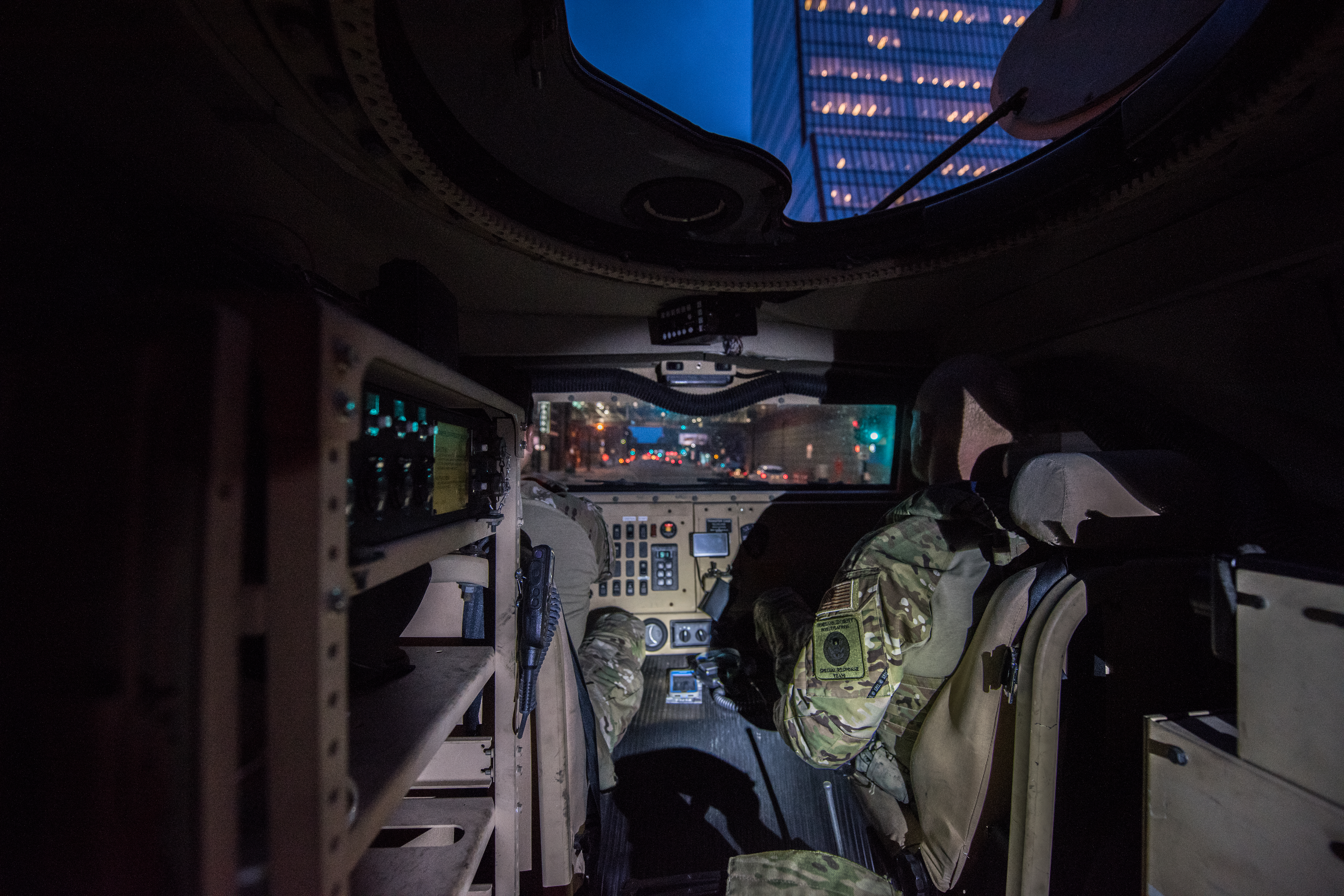
The interior of an Alpha used by ICE Homeland Security and Investigations.

Oshkosh and PVI worked together to create the vehicle with Oshkosh handling production capabilities and engineering experience while PVI created its armored chassis. The MRAP has a capacity for a total of eight people with a V-shaped hull with a monoque layout used to deflect mine and other explosive blasts. It is also capable of being transported to the field by air transport.

The MRAP is equipped with ShieldAll armor made in cooperation with Batelle. ShieldAll is based on available components, including FlexAll hyperplastic material. ShieldAll is made with the weight being one-third lighter and less bulky than steel. Depending on operational needs, the Alpha can have add-on armor added.

The Alpha's ShieldAll armored body incorporates research conducted after the death of Dale Earnhardt, when NASCAR was looking to develop shock-absorbing technology for its racetrack barrier walls.

The Alpha has all-round protection against 7.62mm bullets. It can also withstand .50 BMG bullets. During Explosively Formed Projectile tests, it was able to survive against multiple EFP explosives.

It can be equipped with either 7.62-mm/12.7-mm machine guns or a 40-mm automatic grenade launcher on the roof.
