= Violent Criminal Apprehension Program =

Unit of the US Federal Bureau of Investigation

- Active: 1985–present
- Country: United States
- Agency: Federal Bureau of Investigation
- Part of: National Center for the Analysis of Violent Crime
- Location: FBI Academy
- Abbreviation: ViCAP

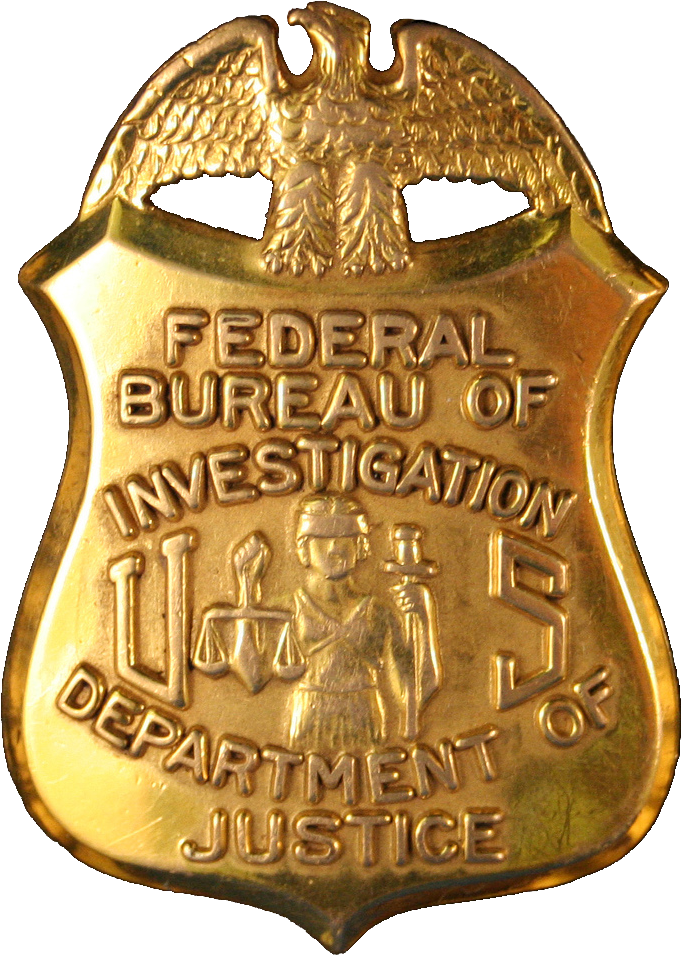
The badge of the Federal Bureau of Investigation (FBI)

The Violent Criminal Apprehension Program (ViCAP) is a unit of the United States Federal Bureau of Investigation (FBI) responsible for the analysis of serial violent and sexual crimes, based in the Critical Incident Response Group's (CIRG) National Center for the Analysis of Violent Crime (NCAVC).

ViCAP was created in 1985 by the FBI and based in Quantico, Virginia. Pierce Brooks was appointed as the first director, primarily because as a homicide detective in Los Angeles he had been the first to propose the idea. Brooks was inspired by the Harvey Glatman case he had worked on, in which he realized serial homicides could be linked by their signature aspects. Brooks would later obtain a $35,000 government grant to realize his idea. In 1982 he met with Robert Ressler to discuss the idea and was convinced by Ressler that ViCAP should be located at Quantico, as opposed to Lakewood where Brooks originally planned to have it housed.

It is designed to track and correlate information on violent crime, especially murder. The FBI provides the software for the database, which is widely used by state and local law enforcement agencies to compile information on:

- sexual assault cases
- solved and unsolved homicides, especially those involving a kidnapping or if they are apparently motiveless, sexual or random, or suspected to be part of a series
- missing persons, where foul play is suspected
- unidentified persons, where foul play is suspected

Cases fitting these categories can be entered into the system by law enforcement officials and compared to other cases in an attempt to correlate and match possible connections. ViCAP has been a tool in solving many cases, including cases decades old and cases in widely separated states. ViCAP is particularly valuable in identifying and tracking serial killers, where separate victims might not otherwise be connected as part of the same pattern.

The aforementioned pattern that links serial homicides is what is commonly referred to as "signature". ViCAP operates under the knowledge that serial homicides are almost always sexually- and control-driven with a consistent evolving signature present in each murder.

In the summer of 2008, the ViCAP program made its database available to all law enforcement agencies through a secure internet link. This allows for real time access to the database and allows agencies to enter and update cases directly into the database.
