= Domestic Security Alliance Council =

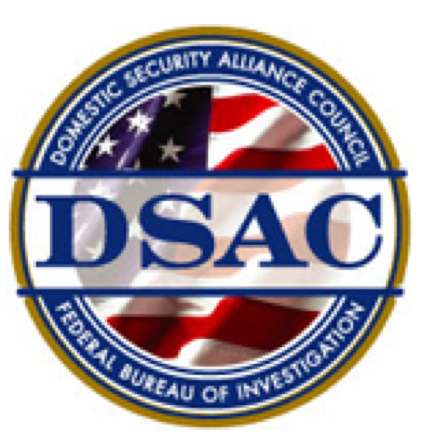
- DSAC logo
- Abbreviation: DSAC

Agency overview
- Formed: 2005

Jurisdictional structure
- Federal agency: USA
- Operations jurisdiction: USA
- General nature: Federal law enforcement

Operational structure
- Agency executive: Arnold E. Bell, Director
- Parent agency: Federal Bureau of Investigation

Website
- http://www.dsac.gov/

The Domestic Security Alliance Council (DSAC) is an American public–private partnership created at the request of corporations "for an FBI-led organization that would bridge the information divide between America’s private and public sectors" in December 2005. The program facilitates information sharing and cooperation between the FBI and over 509 of the largest American companies, which altogether account for over one half of the gross domestic product of the United States and employ more than 20 million people. In December 2012, released documents showed that the DSAC and counter-terrorism programs conducted surveillance of nonviolent Occupy Wall Street protesters in 2011.

== History ==
The Overseas Security Advisory Council (OSAC) was established by the Diplomatic Security Service of the United States Department of State in 1985 as a mechanism for sharing security information between the U.S. private sector and the U.S. government. The FBI Criminal Investigative Division (CID) began to advise OSAC in 1996. In November 2005, by corporate request, the FBI hosted a steering committee composed of Chief Security Officers for major American companies including Citibank, Coca-Cola and Federal Express; this committee founded the Domestic Security Alliance Council (DSAC) the following month. All three of these founding corporations cross-affiliate with the Business Roundtable.

The mission statement of DSAC states that the program is "a strategic partnership between the FBI and the U.S. private sector," that it promotes the "effective exchange of information" between them, and that it allows the FBI to more easily detect and prevent criminal activity involving interstate commerce. DSAC is also supervised by the Department of Homeland Security.

In July 2006, DSAC created a leadership board of 29 business leaders from major companies in the United States. These include companies in the airline, banking, entertainment, food, and other industries. Two-thirds of the members of the leadership board cross-affiliate with the Business Roundtable. In 2010, over 200 companies participated in DSAC, constituting over one third of the US GDP and almost 10% of its labor force. Merck Vice President Grant Ashley, American Undersecretary Dawn Scalici, and assistant FBI director Ronald C. Ruecker are all chairpersons of and executives for DSAC. Merck also cross-affiliates with the Business Roundtable. Other American companies participating in DSAC include Bank of America, Barclays, American Express, MasterCard, United Airlines, Boeing, General Electric, and Walmart. Of these, Bank of America, Barclays, American Express, MasterCard, Boeing, General Electric and Walmart all cross-affiliate with the Business Roundtable.

As of May 2021, DSAC is led by Senior Executives FBI Director Christopher Wray and Secretary of Homeland Security Alejandro Mayorkas. The three co-chairs of the Executive Working Group (EWG), representing the FBI, DHS, and private sector, respectively, are assistant director of the Office of Private Sector Michael Sullivan, director of Private Sector Engagement Tamara Hutchinson, and Disney Senior Vice President and Chief Security Officer Ronald L. Iden.

== Domestic surveillance ==
Following successful freedom of information requests by the Partnership for Civil Justice Fund, the FBI released redacted documents in December 2012 showing that the FBI had spied on Occupy Wall Street (OWS) organizers and passed OWS information to financial firms via DSAC prior to the first OWS protests in Zuccotti Park. FBI officials met with New York Stock Exchange representatives on August 19, 2011, notifying them of planned peaceful protests. FBI officials later met with representatives of the Federal Reserve Bank of Richmond and Zions Bank about planned protests.

The FBI used informants to infiltrate and monitor protests; information from informants and military intelligence units was passed to DSAC, which then gave updates to financial companies. Surveillance of protestors was also carried out by the Joint Terrorism Task Force. DSAC also coordinated with security firms hired by banks to target OWS leaders.

Previously, in December 2011, DSAC had written a report on law enforcement agencies' plans for a 12 December protest at US ports, which involved investigation of links between OWS and port trade unions by the Naval Criminal Investigative Service.

The Partnership for Civil Justice, a non-profit, said that espionage facilitated by DSAC treated "protests against the corporate and banking structure of America as potential criminal and terrorist activity," and said that DSAC was "functioning as a de facto intelligence arm of Wall Street and corporate America." Naomi Wolf wrote in The Guardian that surveillance of OWS by the FBI was conducted with the knowledge of the Obama Administration.

A DSAC brochure states that the benefits of membership in the DSAC include:

- Centralized access to security information not only from the FBI, but from all federal government entities, including the Department of Homeland Security, FEMA, the IRS, U.S. Coast Guard, and the U.S. Secret Service
- Ongoing access to a network of diverse security experts at the highest government and corporate levels
- Continuing education for CSOs through the semi-annual Domestic Security Executive Academy at the FBI Academy, Quantico, VA
- Continuing education for intelligence analysts through quarterly regional Intelligence Analyst Symposiums
- Additional opportunities through participation in DSAC’s committees

== See also ==
- Joint Terrorism Task Force
- Law enforcement and the Occupy movement
- OSAC
- Public-private partnerships in the United States
