= FBI Criminal Investigative Division =

Government department dedicated to criminal investigations

Criminal Investigative Division
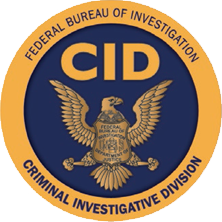
- Emblem of the Criminal Investigative Division
- Active: 1977 – present
- Country: United States
- Agency: Federal Bureau of Investigation
- Part of: Criminal, Cyber, Response, and Services Branch
- Headquarters: J. Edgar Hoover Building; Washington, D.C.
- Abbreviation: CID

Commanders
- Current commander: AD - Jose A. Perez

The Criminal Investigative Division (CID) is a division in the Criminal, Cyber, Response, and Services Branch of the Federal Bureau of Investigation. The CID is the primary component within the FBI responsible for overseeing FBI investigations of traditional crimes including narcotics trafficking and violent crime.

The CID is the FBI's largest operational division with 4,800 field special agents, 300 intelligence analysts, and 520 employees in the headquarters. After the September 11 terror attacks, the CID was dramatically restructured with a significant portion of its resources being diverted into the new FBI National Security Branch.

== Leadership ==
Headed by an FBI assistant director, the CID is led by the executive assistant director of the FBI Criminal, Cyber, Response, and Services Branch. The CID Commander is Jose A. Perez, the assistant director.

== Organization ==
The CID's organizational structure was reorganized during FY 2004 by FBI leadership in an effort to better reflect current trends in criminal activity.

- Branch I (Criminal Enterprise Branch)
  - Transnational Organized Crime Global Section
  - Violent Crime Section
  - Operational Support Section
- Branch II (National Crimes Branch)
  - Public Corruption and Civil Rights Section
  - Financial Crimes Section
  - National Covert Operations Section
- Intelligence Branch
  - Criminal Intelligence Section I
  - Criminal Intelligence Section II
