= Partnership for Civil Justice Fund =

- Founder: Carl Messineo; Mara Verheyden-Hilliard
- Type: Non-profit Progressive Legal Organization
- Location: Washington, D.C.
- Website: www.justiceonline.org

The Partnership for Civil Justice Fund (PCJF) is a nonprofit progressive legal organization based in Washington, D.C. Founded by Carl Messineo and Mara Verheyden-Hilliard, the organization focuses on cases regarding free speech and dissent, domestic spying and surveillance, police misconduct, and government transparency.

The Partnership is known for litigating on behalf of protesters in First Amendment cases. It has frequently sued the District of Columbia government and D.C. police department. In addition to its litigation work in the courts, the Partnership also pursues freedom of information requests to obtain public records relating to police surveillance of activist groups. In 2003, the Washington Post called the organization "the constitutional sheriffs for a new protest generation."

== Establishment and organization ==
The PCJF was founded in 1994 by lawyers Carl Messineo and Mara Verheyden-Hilliard, a married couple. In 2010, the organization consisted of Messineo, Verheyden-Hilliard, and one staff attorney. The group's offices are located on Florida Avenue NW.

== History and activities ==
In 2001, the Partnership brought suit against the D.C. police department for its practices against protesters during Bush's inauguration. The lawsuit "uncovered evidence that the department had suspended rules limiting the use of force during the protests, had pressed undercover officers to infiltrate protest groups and had sought to provoke protesters and uninvolved bystanders by attacking them with batons and pepper spray." In 2006, the case was settled after the D.C. police agreed to pay $685,000 and undertake reforms, including changes to its departmental handbook that instruct officers to "report the use of force during a mass demonstration" and bar officers from making arrests without evidence of a crime. The settlement also provided for additional training for officers assigned to "civil disturbance units."

In 2003, the group was handling a number of significant First Amendment lawsuits stemming from anti-globalization protests, protests at the first inauguration of George W. Bush, and protests against the Iraq War. The group argued in court that the D.C. police department, the FBI, and other government agencies unlawfully suppressed dissent and engaged in "preemptive mass arrests, spying and brutality." The PCJF attracted attention for uncovering new facts about D.C. police and FBI conduct, including efforts to infiltrate and disrupt nonviolent activist groups.

In 2008, the Partnership sued the D.C. police department after it set up random roadblocks in the Trinidad neighborhood of Northeast Washington as part of an effort to stem a wave of summertime violent crime in the neighborhood. The Partnership, representing four D.C. residents, alleged the "military-style" checkpoints led to "widespread civil rights violations" and that the District had "engaged in an unprecedented and unconstitutional system of suspicionless stops and seizures." The Partnership initially lost in the U.S. District Court for the District of Columbia, where Judge Richard J. Leon ruled in favor of the government. On appeal, however, the U.S. Court of Appeals for the District of Columbia reversed that decision. As a result, D.C. chief of police Cathy Lanier was ordered to halt the checkpoint practice.

In 2010, after an eight-year-long litigation battle, PCJF secured a $8.25 million settlement of a class action arising from the mass arrests of nearly 400 people in Pershing Park in Washington, D.C., in September 2002. U.S. District Judge Emmet G. Sullivan, in approving the settlement, said that the settlement was "truly historic" and was the outcome of "a long and historic journey."

The group's views have been sometimes controversial: "Some activists and lawyers also complain that the Partnership, in the crusade of representing dissenters, brooks no dissent." The local American Civil Liberties Union (ACLU) chapter was initially co-counsel with the PCJF in Becker v. District of Columbia, a federal lawsuit for false arrest brought by hundreds of protesters who were arrested at demonstrations against the IMF and World Bank in April 2000, but the groups split over differences in legal tactics and approaches. The case settled in June 2010 for $13.7 million.

Through a Freedom of Information Act request, the PCJF obtained in 2012 a set of FBI documents showing that the FBI counterterrorism agents had monitored the Occupy movement. Verheyden-Hilliard, the executive director, said that the documents showed that the FBI has acted improperly by collecting "information on people's free-speech actions" and entering it into "unregulated databases, a vast storehouse of information widely disseminated to a range of law-enforcement and, apparently, private entities" (see Domestic Security Alliance Council). In 2014, the PCJF obtained an additional 4,000 pages of unclassified documents through a Freedom of Information Act request, showing "details of the scrutiny of the Occupy protests in 2011 and 2012 by law enforcement officers, federal officials, security contractors and others."

The PCJF has opposed the Federal Restricted Buildings and Grounds Improvement Act (the "Trespass Act") and its 2011 amendment, believing that it infringes on the right to assemble.

The PCJF successfully represented two activist groups, the A.N.S.W.E.R. Coalition and the Muslim American Society Freedom Foundation, in a dispute with the District of Columbia over District laws regulating political messages on streetlight lampposts. Under the District's regulations, "signs advertising a specific event" had to be removed within 30 days, while "those with a general political message" were permitted to remain for up to 180 days. In 2012, U.S. Chief District Judge Royce C. Lamberth struck down the event-specific limitation as unconstitutional, finding that under the First Amendment, the District "cannot simply allow each officer to independently decide whether certain speech runs afoul of the law. Even if the officers apply the law in good faith – without discriminatory motive or bias – the possibility of inconsistent enforcement can chill speech."

On October 1, 2012, about seven hundred Occupy Wall Street protesters were arrested after demonstrating on the Brooklyn Bridge. Soon afterward, the protesters, represented by the PCJF, filed a lawsuit against police, alleging that the police had violated their constitutional rights by falsely arresting them. The protesters specifically alleged that police had allowed the protestors onto the bridge, and had even led them "on the roadway, only to surround them minutes later with orange netting," essentially "luring them into a trap." The City and other defendants denied the claims. In June 2012, U.S. District Judge Jed Rakoff allowed the lawsuit to proceed. In August 2014, the U.S. Court of Appeals for the Second Circuit allowed the lawsuit—Garcia v. Doe—to proceed, but reversed itself in February 2015 following a rehearing, and dismissed the suit.

The PCJF carried out a "Thank You, Ed Snowden" campaign in support of NSA whistleblower Edward Snowden. The campaign involved PCJF's placement of a "crowdfunded" Metrobus advertisement in support of Snowden. The initial campaign lasted for four weeks in late 2013. The PCJF said they received enough support from around the world to sponsor partial ads on five more buses in 2014.

The PCJF sought government records related to a controversial partnership between the D.C. police department and the District of Columbia Public Schools over D.C.'s "Security Resource Officer" program, involving police officers posted inside schools. PCJF won a court order in the D.C. Superior Court to have orders and policies released. This "was [the] most comprehensive release of police documents in the history of DC's Freedom of Information Act."

In November 2016, Verheyden-Hilliard of PCJF argued on behalf of the A.N.S.W.E.R. Coalition in a case before the U.S. Court of Appeals for the D.C. Circuit. The case addressed whether activists had a constitutional right to demonstrate on the sidewalks of Pennsylvania Avenue during the Inauguration Day parade. The demonstrators specifically sought "access to two key points along the Pennsylvania Avenue parade route — Freedom Plaza and the plaza in front of the newly opened Trump International Hotel at the Old Post Office Pavilion. The court ruled in favor of the government days before the inauguration of Donald Trump, upholding the National Park Service's rules on the location of inaugural parade protests. The court held that while the First Amendment requires the government to allow "ample space for peaceful demonstrations," it did not support A.N.S.W.E.R.'s "claim of a right to displace spectator bleachers with its own demonstration at Freedom Plaza."

In January 2017, the PCJF was one of several public-interest legal organizations to offer free legal assistance to individuals arrested in protests during Trump's inauguration. In the lead-up to the inauguration, the PCJF criticized the Park Service and Trump's transition officials for moving slowly in granting permits for protesters to march during the inauguration weekend. In March 2017, after the Metropolitan Police Department of the District of Columbia (MPD) failed to respond to a request to release records of arrests on Inauguration Day, the PCJF filed suit against the MPD in an effort to compel the records' disclosure.
