= Air velocity =

Air velocity may refer to:

- Wind speed, the speed of the air currents
- Airspeed, the speed of an aircraft relative to the air.

== See also ==
- Airspeed (disambiguation)
