= Frankenstein and Me =

Horror film

- Directed by: Robert Tinnell
- Written by: Robert Tinnell; David Sherman
- Produced by: Richard Goudreau; Manon Lavoie; René Malo; Jeffrey Tinnell
- Starring: Jamieson Boulanger; Louise Fletcher; Burt Reynolds; Myriam Cyr; Ryan Gosling; Polly Shannon
- Cinematography: Roxanne di Santo
- Edited by: Gaétan Huot
- Music by: Normand Corbeil
- Production companies: France Film; Telefilm Canada
- Release date: July 12, 1996
- Running time: 91 minutes
- Country: United States
- Language: English

Frankenstein and Me is a 1996 period piece family horror film set in the late 1960s, directed by Robert Tinnell. The film pays homage to the enduring legacy of Frankenstein's monster in cinema, blending elements of fantasy, coming-of-age drama, and nostalgic Americana such as drive-in culture. It is notable for marking the first feature-length film appearance of actor Ryan Gosling. The film was released in Germany as Frankenstein & Ich.

== Plot ==
Set in rural Arizona during the late 60's, the story follows Earl Williams (Jamieson Boulanger), a creative and highly imaginative 12-year-old boy who is deeply obsessed with classic horror films, particularly Universal Pictures' monster movies like Frankenstein and The Wolf Man. Earl routinely retreats into vivid, stylistic black-and-white fantasies where he, his younger brother Larry (Ricky Mabe), and their neighborhood friend Kenny (Ryan Gosling) live inside the worlds of films like Night of the Living Dead and Brides of Dracula.

While Earl's relentless daydreaming makes him an excellent student, it constantly draws the ire of his deeply cynical, intolerant schoolteacher, Mrs. Betty Perdue (Louise Fletcher), who routinely punishes him for his "unproductive" fixations. Earl’s mother, Judy (Myriam Cyr), also worries about his inability to ground himself in reality. However, Earl finds an ally in his warm, supportive father, Les Williams (Burt Reynolds). Les is a fellow dreamer who wanted a career in show business but never achieved financial success; despite his hardships, he passionately encourages Earl to hold onto his imagination and shoot for the stars.

The family's dynamic is shattered when Les suffers a sudden, fatal heart attack. Devastated and lost, Judy tries to force Earl to drop his monster fantasies and face the grim realities of the world. To cope with his grief, Earl decides to honor his late father by making his dreams a reality. He uncovers a 20-second sketch of a mad scientist's laboratory his father had drawn before dying. Enlisting Larry and Kenny, Earl sets up shop in an abandoned desert mine shaft, meticulously building a makeshift, rigged-together electrical laboratory out of junk to mirror his dad's drawing.

The boys' project takes a radical turn when a traveling carnival passes through their small town. The carnival features a sideshow attraction boasting the "real, preserved" Frankenstein's monster. As the carnival trucks packed with equipment depart in the middle of the night, a heavy crate accidentally slips off the back of a truck and tumbles into the brush. Earl discovers the crate and is ecstatic to find what appears to be the authentic, dormant body of Frankenstein's monster inside. Instead of turning the crate over to the authorities, Earl, Larry, and Kenny secretly transport the heavy prop back to their hidden mine shaft laboratory. Rather than trying to resurrect his deceased father, Earl shifts his grief and fixations entirely toward bringing the monster to life using harnessed electricity—viewing it as the ultimate triumph of a dreamer over reality.

As a massive storm approaches the region, the boys prepare their intricate lightning rods. However, Earl's missing-person antics and suspicious behavior have already put the local authorities, including Deputy Tom Gonzales (Roc LaFortune) and the school system, on high alert. The storm breaks out, and Earl successfully channels the lightning strike down into the mine shaft to shock the creature. The experiment seemingly fails just as the Deputy and townsfolk arrive to shamefully take their children home. Sometime later Earl is taken before a judge at the local courthouse to be sentenced for his crimes. Mrs. Perdue is present to express her views on Earl's perceived mental illness, insisting that he has clearly demonstrated that he is a danger to society. During the chambers hearing, Earl's mother has a change of heart and comes to her son's defense, asking the judge to let her handle his disciplinary action at home.

Back at the Williams residence, Earl has a vision of his father, Les while imaging himself and his brother starring in a Mummy movie. Les yells "cut!" just before Kharis is able to grab them. Using stage direction as metaphor, Les tells Earl he expects to see a bit more from him than his younger brother, as he is now the man of the house. Les assures the boys that he loves them and that in the afterlife he can now finally paint his dreams on the silverscreen. Earl's mother enters the garage and the waking dream ends. Earl agrees to help with chores around the house before retiring to his room to draw and read about monsters in the evenings. Earl's mother reminds him that he's still grounded, but presents him with the latest issue of Famous Monsters of Filmland. The film closes on a shot of the Mojave Desert and unbeknownst to the locals the Monster has indeed returned to life, lumbering out into the wilderness.

== Cast ==
- Jamieson Boulanger as Earl Williams
- Ricky Mabe as Larry Williams
- Myriam Cyr as Judy Williams
- Burt Reynolds as Les Williams
- Louise Fletcher as Mrs. Perdue
- Ryan Gosling as Kenny
- Polly Shannon as Elizabeth

== Production ==
The outdoor portions of the film was shot in the Mojave Desert while the indoor portions were shot in Montreal.

== Reception ==
Bryan Senn writing for The Werewold Filmography in 2017 wrote, "Clever, touching and entertaining, Frankenstein and Me is tailor-made for every monster-lover whose heart has remained true to his or her childhood dreams" and concluded that it "is not only a poignant trip down Memory Lane, but a validation of secret childhood wonder–feelings that monsters do exist and, if one believes strongly enough, anything is possible".
