= Gaslit by My Husband: The Morgan Metzer Story =

- Directed by: Lee Gabiana
- Written by: Benjamin Anderson
- Produced by: Robert Tinnell; Jeffrey Tinnell
- Starring: Jana Kramer; Austin Nichols; Abigail Esmena
- Cinematography: Broderick Engelhard
- Production company: Allegheny Image Factory
- Release date: 2024
- Country: United States
- Language: English

Gaslit by My Husband: The Morgan Metzer Story is a 2024 Lifetime drama directed by Lee Gabiana. The movie follows the true story of Morgan Metzer's abusive marriage to ex-husband Rodney Metzer, including a violent attack he orchestrated against her.

In March 2026, the film appeared as the #1 movie on Netflix.

== Plot ==
Morgan Metzer is married to Rodney Metzer; they then gave birth to twin siblings Amilia and Mason. They also had another child who died sometime after birth. As their marriage continues, he makes claims of her cheating on him, popping pills again, and befriending someone with a criminal record. These things lead to their marriage being strained and they end up getting a divorce where he fails to gain custody of the twins. At 12:00 AM on New Year's Day, a masked intruder breaks into Morgan's house and sexually assaults her. Rodney shows up minutes later. When the police are alerted, Rodney tells him his side of the story. Though one police officer suspects that Rodney's claim might not be true.

== Cast ==
- Jana Kramer as Morgan Metzer
- Austin Nichols as Rodney Metzer
- Abigail Esmena as Nicole
- Jolie Rae Caussin as Amilia Metzer
- Maximo Sebastian as Mason Metzer
- Stephanie Cotton as Kathy Metzer
- Pete Burris as Rod Metzer, Sr.
- Denise Dal Vera as Lindsey
- J. Barrett Cooper as Richard
- Vince Foster as Officer Jones
- Robert Liscio as Officer MacLaughlin

== Production ==
Produced by Allegheny Image Factory, the film was shot entirely in West Virginia, with scenes taking place in Fairmont, Mannington, and Shinnston.
