= Kids of the Round Table =

- Directed by: Robert Tinnell
- Written by: David Sherman; Robert Tinnell
- Screenplay by: David Sherman
- Based on: Arthurian legend
- Produced by: Richard Goudreau
- Starring: Malcolm McDowell; Michael Ironside; Peter Aykroyd; Melissa Altro; René Simard
- Cinematography: Roxanne di Santo
- Edited by: Gaétan Huot
- Music by: Normand Corbeil
- Production companies: Desert Music Pictures; Melenny Productions; Téléfilm Canada
- Distributed by: Malofilm International
- Release dates: May 1995 (Cannes Film Festival); December 15, 1995 (Quebec, Canada); January 12, 1996 (USA television premiere on Disney Channel)
- Running time: 89 minutes
- Countries: Canada; United States
- Language: English

Kids of the Round Table is a 1995 Canadian/American fantasy film written and directed by Robert Tinnell. Malcolm McDowell, Michael Ironside and newcomer Johnny Morina star in a modern-day adventure filled with medieval magic.

== Plot ==
A boy named Alex Cole and his friends have fun participating in pretend medieval battles at a "castle" built from a shed. After one such battle, the kids gather around a round table and Alex tells his friends about the legend of King Arthur. A group of bullies led by James "Scar" Scarsdale arrives and intimidates Alex's friends into fleeing. Alex fights back by throwing a water balloon at Scar. The bullies chase Alex into the woods, but Alex loses them and encounters a sword lodged in a stone. He pulls the sword from the stone, at which point the wizard Merlin appears and brings Alex to his dwelling in a tree where he begins teaching Alex how to use the sword, which he reveals to be Excalibur.

Alex befriends a new kid at school named Luke, whom he invites to visit the castle. When they arrive, they find that Scar and his bullies are harassing Alex's friends. Alex calls upon the power of Excalibur, allowing him to easily defeat Scar in a fistfight. Alex, Luke, and the other kids manage to intimidate the bullies into retreating. To reward Luke for helping them, Alex accepts him as one of the "knights". Afterwards, Alex visits Merlin, who advises Alex that he should never misuse Excalibur's power, since doing so would lead to him losing Excalibur.

Scar's father Butch tells his associates Gil and Stu that he plans to commit a crime and then to flee town. Alex finds out that his friend Jenny, whom he has a crush on, is attracted to Luke. This makes Alex depressed and he avoids visiting Merlin that day. Merlin, however, visits Alex at night and advises him that young love can lead to pain. The next day, Alex's jealousy causes him to attack Luke. Luke initially overpowers Alex and tries to talk sense into him, but Alex draws power from Excalibur and punches Luke to the ground. Jenny tells Alex that she now hates him for what he did and that he is worse than Scar. Rejected by his friends, Alex goes to Merlin's tree but Merlin is not there. He goes home to check on Excalibur, but the sword is gone. Alex returns to the tree, where he hears Merlin's voice tell him that he has misused Excalibur's power and that he hopes Alex will learn from his mistake.

Alex talks with his father, who advises him to apologize to his friends. Butch, Gil, and Stu rob the local bank. Jenny is having a party at her house with several other kids, including Luke. Meanwhile, her father, Sheriff Rick Ferguson, hears about the robbery and goes out to deal with it. After Ferguson leaves, Butch and his henchmen go to the house and hold Jenny, her mother, and the party guests hostage. Butch, who has a grudge against Ferguson, plans to wait until Ferguson returns and use him as a hostage to get them past police roadblocks during their getaway.

Alex arrives at Jenny's house and discovers what is happening. He sabotages the crooks' getaway car by flattening its tires. Alex lures Gil and Stu to a nearby barn, where he outsmarts and traps them. Alex sneaks into the house and calls the police to inform them of the situation. Butch captures Alex and takes him to the getaway car, abandoning his henchmen and the hostages. Despite the car's flat tires, Butch drives off with Alex. When the car gets stuck in a ditch, Butch tries to flee on foot with Alex, but Alex escapes and the other kids arrive and pelt Butch with apples. Alex disarms Butch and incapacitates him by throwing an apple at his groin. Sheriff Ferguson and the police arrive and arrest Butch. Alex apologizes to Jenny and Luke for attacking Luke and for being jealous.

Later, Alex goes into the woods. He encounters Scar and his friends, who make peace with Alex. He goes to Merlin's tree, where Merlin appears and reveals to Alex that he never really lost Excalibur because Excalibur is the good in him. Alex asks if he is King Arthur, and Merlin tells him that he can be Arthur if he wants to be, i.e. aspire to be everything Arthur represented, though he is not Arthur reincarnated. Merlin then vanishes.

The film closes with a scene in Los Angeles, where another child encounters a sword in a stone.

== Cast ==
- Johnny Morina as Alex Cole
- Maggie Castle as Jenny Ferguson
- Christopher Olscamp as Norman
- Justin Borntraeger as James "Scar" Scarsdale
- Billy Coyle as Ronnie
- Jeoffrey Graves as Buck
- Malcolm McDowell as Merlin
- Peter Aykroyd as Mr. Cole, Alex's Father
- Mélany Goudreau as Cindy, The Waitress
- James Rae as Sheriff Rick Ferguson, Jenny's Father
- Jamieson Boulanger as Luke
- Roc LaFortune as Gil
- Michael Ironside as Butch Scarsdale, Scar's Father
- René Simard as Stu
- Melissa Altro as Heather
- Barbara Jones as Mrs. Ferguson, Jenny's Mother
- Charles Edwin Powell as State Trooper

== Release ==
=== Theatrical release ===
Kids of the Round Table premiered at the 1995 Cannes Film Festival, which was held from May 17 to 28 of that year. On December 15, 1995, the film was released in theaters in Quebec, Canada, under both its English title and the French title Apprentis Chevaliers.

=== Television premiere ===
The film had its world television premiere on The Disney Channel on January 12, 1996.

=== Home media ===
The film was released on VHS tape on July 8, 1997, and on DVD on July 25, 2006.

== Reception ==
Brendan Kelly of Variety gave a positive critique of the performances of McDowell, Ironside, and Simard, and wrote that Robert Tinnell did "a good job of crafting an efficient, fast-moving pic".

== 2015 comic book spin-off ==
The film's writer and director Robert Tinnell partnered with Aaron J. Shelton to write a four-issue comic book mini-series spin-off published by Action Lab Comics between May and September 2015.
