= Beneath the Dark =

- Directed by: Chad Feehan
- Written by: Chad Feehan
- Starring: Josh Stewart; Jamie-Lynn Sigler; Chris Browning
- Production company: The Fort
- Distributed by: IFC Films
- Release dates: March 13, 2010 (SXSW); November 5, 2010 (United States)
- Running time: 102 minutes
- Country: United States
- Language: English

Beneath the Dark is a 2010 American mystery-thriller film directed by Chad Feehan, and starring Josh Stewart, Jamie-Lynn Sigler and Chris Browning.

It was originally titled Wake and was inspired by the novel The Shining.

== Plot ==
Driving to a wedding in Los Angeles through the Mojave Desert, Paul and Adrienne pull off the highway and into Roy's Motel and Café. This roadside rest stop proves to be a strange and surreal place with an unsettling mix of travelers, who force the couple to discover a hidden secret.

== Cast ==
- Josh Stewart as Paul
- Jamie-Lynn Sigler as Adrienne
- Chris Browning as Frank
- Angela Featherstone as Sandy
- Afemo Omilami as The Man
- Trevor Morgan as Jason
- Christopher Gessner as Max
- Robert Maxhimer as Billy
- Jeannetta Arnette as Shirley
- Grainger Hines as Tim
- Sandy Martin as Colleen
- Carlease Burke as Beatrice
- Chris Hayes as Cameraman
- Melissa Bacelar as Shawnee
- Wade Feehan as Pledge

== Release ==
The film was previewed at the South by Southwest film festival on March 13, 2010. It was released as direct-to-video in multiple regions throughout 2010 and 2011, but was also made available in theaters in Australia on October 31, 2011.

== Reception ==
The New York Times reviewed the film as "Airless, tortuous and broody to a fault", explaining that "there are lots of reasons why horror filmmakers keep checking their characters into seedy motels... but not even the Bates Motel itself could save the mess that is 'Beneath the Dark.'"

The Hollywood Reporter noted that it was "defeated by the convoluted story line, sluggish pacing and a general 'been there, seen that' feeling induced by the proceedings. Although boasting strongly atmospheric visuals and effective performances, [it] never rises above a general level of murkiness."
