= Pippi Longstocking (1997 film) =

1997 animated film by Clive Smith

- American video release poster
- Directed by: Clive Smith
- Screenplay by: Catharina Stackelberg
- Based on: Pippi Longstocking by Astrid Lindgren
- Produced by: Waldemar Bergendahl; Hasmis Giakoumis; Merle Anne-Ridley; Michael Shack
- Starring: Melissa Altro; Catherine O'Hara; Gordon Pinsent; Dave Thomas; Wayne Robson; Carole Pope
- Edited by: Noda Tsarmados
- Music by: Anders Berglund
- Production companies: Nelvana Limited; AB Svensk Filmindustri; IdunaFilm; TFC Trickompany
- Distributed by: AB Svensk Filmdindustri (Sweden); Columbia TriStar Film Distributors International (Germany); Malofilm (Canada)
- Release dates: 3 October 1997 (Sweden); 22 January 1998 (Germany)
- Running time: 77 minutes
- Countries: Canada; Germany; Sweden
- Language: English
- Budget: $10 million
- Box office: $505,335

Pippi Longstocking is a 1997 animated musical adventure comedy film directed by Clive Smith, and written by Catharina Stackelberg, based on the eponymous children's books by Astrid Lindgren. A joint Canadian-German-Swedish venture co-produced by AB Svensk Filmindustri, IdunaFilm, TFC Trickompany and Nelvana Limited, the film features the voices of Melissa Altro, Catherine O'Hara, Gordon Pinsent, Dave Thomas, Wayne Robson and Carole Pope.

For its releases in both the United States and Canada, the film was distributed theatrically by Legacy Releasing in the US, Malofilm in Canada, and on VHS and DVD by Warner Home Video under their Warner Bros. Family Entertainment label. It is Nelvana's first animated theatrical feature since Babar: The Movie.

The film served as a pilot of a spin-off television series, which premiered on Teletoon in Canada, and then aired on HBO.

== Plot ==
The film begins with Pippi, girl born with tremendous strength, sails around the world with her father, Captain Efraim Longstocking, her pet horse, her pet monkey, Mr. Nilsson, and various members of the ship's crew. One night during a hurricane, the captain is washed overboard into the sea. As he drifts off, he calls to Pippi that he will "meet her in Villa Villekulla". To that effect, Pippi and her pet animals make their way home, Villa Villekulla, to await his return. Not long after arriving, she makes friends with the two children across the street, Tommy and Annika Settergren, who are captivated by her free spirit and fun-loving attitude.

Pippi attracts the attention of a local social worker, Mrs. Helga Prysselius, who learns from Pippi that her mother passed away when she was little and her father is currently lost at sea, and wants to put Pippi in a children's home (english translation for "barnhem" which is what scandinavia calls to put orphaned children all in place aka orphanage). When Mrs. Prysselius goes to speak with the local law enforcement of the need for the girl to be placed in a home for orphans, the thieves, Bloom and Thunder-Karlsson, hears the certain details (her lack of adult supervision, living alone, having a large supply of gold coins kept out in the open, and most of all, leaving her door unlocked), Bloom and Thunder-Karlsson decide to rob Pippi's home once they break out of jail. The police, Kling and Klang, have been busy with fishing instead of going to Pippi.

Tommy and Annika convince Pippi to go to school (for the first time in her life), despite winning the hearts of her classmates, she gets into trouble with teacher who tells Pippi about behaving properly in social. Tommy and Annika's mother Ingrid invites Pippi to a tea party where Mrs. Prysselius attends and is displeased to see Pippi is yet to be put in children's home, Pippi eats up an entire cake meant for everyone and proceed to force Mrs. Prysselius to dance with her which makes Mrs. Prysselius and guests storm off. Upset about Pippi's rude actions and lack of consideration, Ingrid tells Pippi she can not invite her again if she do not learn to behave; Pippi is distraught hearing it again and leaves when realising she made a bad impression.

During the evening Bloom and Thunder-Karlsson is out of jail and goes to Villa Villakulla and sees Pippi with the gold, but they leave when Pippi mentions Mr. Nilsson, thinking it is a man and not knowing Mr. Nilsson is a monkey. Kling and Klang comes to Pippi, but Pippi confuses them not to take her to children‘s home. Next evening Bloom and Thunder-Karlsson shows up and is seen by Pippi, as they try to take the gold it is not easy due to Pippi, they offer Pippi to help her with something and Pippi asks them to teach her a type of a dance called "shoddish", Thunder-Karlsson dances with Pippi to distract her while Bloom get the gold but it do not work, after a crazy dancing the men can not take it anymore and flees before Pippi tried to gift them two pieces of gold.

The next day Tommy and Annika arrive to Pippi as they go to the circus, Pippi have put traps while being away, Bloom and Thunder-Karlsson try to break in but they see Mrs. Prysselius shows up not knowing Pippi just left and falls into one of the traps. Bloom and Thunder-Karlsson are soon discovered by Mrs. Prysselius, they decide to help her to get Pippi to a children's home (so they can steal the gold easier with Pippi out of the way), Mrs. Prysselius agrees to the team up and gives them a plan. At the circus Pippi and her friends watch the show while Mrs. Prysselius sits near them, Bloom and Thunder-Karlsson sneaks inside and disguise themselves as clowns, Pippi beats a strong performer and is picked up by Bloom and Thunder-Karlsson, but they fail to capture her as she gets away from them.

Mrs. Prysselius orders the men to go after Pippi and they take a circus vehicle, Pippi and her friends on her horse are chased by Bloom and Thunder-Karlsson with Mrs. Prysselius on her bike and the police, as Bloom almost reaches them Thunder-Karlsson stops and gets a better idea, Kling and Klang stops to fish in a lake, Bloom and Thunder-Karlsson beats Pippi to Villa Villakulla to get the gold before Pippi arrives but they go into the traps inside. As Pippi and her friends soon arrives, Mrs. Prysselius crashes her bike and is sent flying into a bush.

Mrs. Prysselius has had enough, gets into a breakdown and is about to forcefully drag Pippi straight to the children's home herself, but is thwarted by the arrival of Captain Longstocking and Pippi is happily reunited with her father, this causes Mrs. Prysselius to see that Pippi is not an orphan and no longer has any justification to have Pippi sent to the children's home, Bloom and Thunder-Karlsson runs out of the house and into the police to take them back to jail. As Pippi is going back to their life on the sea, Pippi decides that she can not leave her new friends and decides to stay in Villa Villekulla, her father accepts and gives goodbye to next time they see each other, Pippi and her friends go to think what they should do together tomorrow (as Mrs. Prysselius goes after Pippi again when she once again with no adults).

== Cast ==
- Melissa Altro as Pippilotta Delicatessa Windowshade Mackrelmint Efraim's Daughter "Pippi" Longstocking
- Catherine O'Hara as Mrs. Helga Prysselius
- Gordon Pinsent as Captain Efraim Longstocking
- Chris Wiggins as Fridolf
- Dave Thomas as Thunder-Karlsson
- Wayne Robson as Bloom
- Carole Pope as Teacher
- Noah Reid as Tommy Settegren
- Olivia Garratt as Annika Settegren
  - Judy Tate provides Annika's singing voice.
- Rick Jones as Constable Kling / O'Malley
- Philip Williams as Constable Klang / Ringmaster
- Mari Trainor as Mrs. Kling
- Elva Mai Hoover as Mrs. Klang
- Richard Binsley as Mr. Nilsson / Mrs. Prysselius' Dog
- Karen Bernstein as Mrs. Ingrid Settergren
- Martin Lavut as Mr. Sven Settergren

== Musical numbers ==
1. "What Shall I Do Today?" - Pippi
2. "Hey-Ho, I'm Pippi" - Pippi
3. "Recipe for Life" - Pippi, Tommy and Annika
4. "A Bowler and a New Gold Tooth" - Bloom and Thunder-Karlsson
5. "A Bowler and a New Gold Tooth" (reprise) - Bloom and Thunder-Karlsson
6. "Pluttifikation" - Teacher, Pippi and Students
7. "The Schottische" - Bloom, Pippi and Thunder-Karlsson
8. "What Shall I Do Today?" (reprise) - Pippi
9. "Hey-Ho, I'm Pippi" (reprise) - Pippi
10. "Recipe for Life" (reprise) - Pippi, Tommy and Annika

== Production ==
The film was confirmed to be in the works around September of 1995, subject to greenlighting from its production partners, alongside a companion television series that was currently in development at that time, with Nelvana co-founder Smith hired to write and direct the film.

== Release ==
=== Box office ===
Pippi Longstocking opened theatrically in the United States on 22 August 1997 in 73 venues. In its opening weekend, the film earned $62,196, ranking number 23 in the box office. The film closed on 30 October 1997, having grossed $505,335 against its budget of $11.5 million, making it a box-office bomb.

=== Critical reception ===
The film received mixed reviews from critics. Review aggregator website Rotten Tomatoes reports a 43% rating based on 7 reviews, with an average rating of 4.4/10. Lawrence Van Gelder of The New York Times gave the film a positive review, stating "As Goldilocks might say, when it comes to uncomplicated children's entertainment, this Pippi Longstocking is not too big, not too small, but just right." Gene Seymour of the Los Angeles Times had a more mixed opinion: "Enough of the 'Pippi' spirit is contained in this movie to excuse its gratuitous, eminently forgettable songs and standard-issue animation." Howard Feinstein of Variety largely disapproved of Melissa Altro's acting, but praised the performances for "Pluttifikation" and "A Bowler and a New Gold Tooth".
