= Back Fork =

- Release poster
- Directed by: Josh Stewart
- Written by: Josh Stewart
- Produced by: Josh Stewart; Tony Sgro; Jeffrey Tinnell; Robert Tinnell
- Starring: Josh Stewart; A. J. Cook; Agnes Bruckner; Wade Williams; Dorothy Lyman; Doug Bradley
- Cinematography: Ellie Ann Fenton
- Edited by: Yaniv Dabach
- Production companies: Allegheny Image Factory; Back Fork Productions
- Distributed by: Uncork'd Entertainment
- Release date: 9 April 2019
- Running time: 98 minutes
- Country: United States
- Language: English

Back Fork is a 2019 American drama film directed by Josh Stewart, starring Josh Stewart, A. J. Cook, Agnes Bruckner, Wade Williams and Dorothy Lyman.

== Plot ==
Once a hardworking family-man, Waylon now struggles to hold his life together after an unbearable tragedy. He and his wife go through the motions of life, but all the suffering pushes Waylon to a dependency on pills and a destructive lifestyle.

== Cast ==
- Josh Stewart as Waylon
- A. J. Cook as Nida
- Agnes Bruckner as Rayleen
- Wade Williams as Bill
- Dorothy Lyman as Susie
- Doug Bradley as Sheriff

== Release ==
The film was released on 5 April 2019.

== Reception ==
Frank Scheck of The Hollywood Reporter praised Stewart's performance and wrote that while the film "doesn’t break any new ground either in terms of substance or style", it "packs a quiet punch".

Katie Walsh of the Los Angeles Times called the film "hushed, poetic and intimate", despite the fact that "we never get a sense of the characters’ true anguish and pain".
