= Camp Lakebottom =

- The series' title card with the characters from left to right (Rosebud, Sawyer, Gretchen, Armand, McGee, Squirt, and Slimey)
- Also known as: Lakebottom
- Genre: Adventure; Fantasy; Action; Comedy-horror
- Created by: Eric Jacobson; Betsy McGowen
- Developed by: Meghan Davies; Shelley Hoffman; Robert Pincombe
- Directed by: Phil Lafrance & Jamie LeClaire (seasons 1–2); Ted Collyer (season 2); Jennifer Sherman (season 3)
- Voices of: Scott McCord; Melissa Altro; Darren Frost; Carter Hayden; Cliff Saunders; Adrian Truss; Jonathan Wilson; Bryn McAuley
- Opening theme: "Camp Lakebottom Theme Song" by Terry Tompkins and Scott McCord
- Composers: Asher Lenz; Stephen Skratt
- Country of origin: Canada
- Original language: English
- No. of seasons: 3
- No. of episodes: 65 (130 segments) (list of episodes)

Production
- Executive producers: Eric Jacobson; Betsy McGowen; Kevin Gilles; Vince Commisso; Steve Jarosz
- Producers: For Jam Filled Entertainment:Kyle McDougall (season 1); Marissa Collyer (season 2); Steve Murphy (season 3)
- Running time: 22 minutes (11 minutes per short)
- Production companies: Skywriter Media & Entertainment Group; Jam Filled Entertainment (season 1); 9 Story Media Group

Original release
- Network: Teletoon (Canada); Disney XD (U.S.)
- Release: July 4, 2013 – July 24, 2017

Camp Lakebottom is a Canadian animated television series produced by 9 Story Media Group that premiered on Teletoon in Canada on July 4, 2013 and on Disney XD in the U.S. on July 13, 2013. The show aired on Disney Channels worldwide (except Israel, where it aired on Arutz HaYeladim, and Portugal, where it aired on Biggs and RTP2), as well as on ABC in Australia.

In April 2014, Teletoon renewed the show for a second season of 26 additional episodes, which aired from 2015 to 2016. A third season started airing on July 3, 2017. The show aired its final episode on July 24, 2017.

== Plot ==
Three 12-year-old kids: McGee, Gretchen, and Squirt are sent to the wrong summer camp bus and have all sorts of adventures in a camp called Camp Lakebottom, while trying to protect the camp from McGee's nemesis, Jordan Buttsquat, at Camp Sunny Smiles.

== Characters ==
- McGee (voiced by Scott McCord) is a 12-year-old daredevil, mastermind and accident-prone thrill seeker whose curiosity often leads him to act before he thinks. He has an utter inability to recognize impending danger, combined with a habit of ignoring the counselors' warnings, and as a result, he constantly gets himself and his friends into trouble, but it is his eager mind which always gets them back out as well. This has led him to develop the catchphrase "Should've thought that through". Among all the campers, he is the most intrigued and tolerant of Camp Lakebottom, fascinated by its potential sources of fun and adventure. He is a self-proclaimed master of pranks, as revealed in "Pranks for Nothing", but his pranks are actually quite lame. His nemesis is Buttsquat.
- Gretchen (voiced by Melissa Altro) is one of McGee's best friends. She is a girl described as anything but "sugary sweet"; she is sardonic and indifferent to everything, and a tomboy. Her lack of enthusiasm is made up for with her sharp, critical tongue. With a black belt in karate and an intolerance toward wrongdoing, Gretchen is not a girl to mess with. Her nemesis is Suzi. However, underneath the tough exterior, she has a huge heart and secretly wishes she could be like any normal girl (though she would never reveal this). Her catchphrases are "Ya think?!" (usually said to McGee when a plan has gone wrong and he points out the obvious) and "Drop that Squirt!" (usually said anytime someone captures Squirt). She is revealed to have a severe phobia of chipmunks in "Cheeks of Dread". Her father calls her "Gretchikins" and her mother calls her "Gretchywetchy". Gretchen is nicknamed "The Gretch", and her parents have the surname Gritcherson.
- Squirt (voiced by Darren Frost) is one of McGee's best friends. A dimwitted simpleton in his own right, he is always cheerful and a friend to all living things, even if they're trying to kill him. He has befriended just about every monster ever to set foot in Camp Lakebottom. While his omnibenevolence sometimes comes in handy in dealing with the monsters that constantly appear, his extreme lack of intelligence often makes him susceptible to control from many villains, the most prominent example being "Mindsuckers From the Depths", where an evil, giant leech attaches to his head and mind-controls him. In "Late Afternoon of the Living Gitch", it's revealed he has worn the same pair of underwear all his life.
- Sawyer (voiced by Cliff Saunders) is a lovable Zombie with a mixed-purpose tool taking the place of his left hand, which is frequently a chainsaw. He is one of the camp's counselors and the one who usually accompanies the kids on their adventures. As a zombie, his head and limbs constantly fall off, but can be reattached. He has distanced himself from the stereotype of zombies as brainless monsters who hunger for brains and has revealed he has a heart (quite literally, as he takes it out of his chest), he has vowed to look after the human campers and often acts as a grandfatherly figure to them. He serves as the camp's handyman and has constructed bizarre inventions throughout the series, including a Frankenstein's Monster in "Frankenfixer". In "Zombie Dearest", Sawyer is revealed to have a zombie mother who acts like a stereotypical brain eating zombie, whom Sawyer abandoned out of defiance toward her habits.
- Armand (voiced by Adrian Truss) is a sasquatch with a passion for the performing arts and dreams of becoming an actor. He is another one of the camp's counselors. While he is usually very kind, easygoing, and quite difficult to anger, the rare instances in which he has been angered have proven to be dangerous to everyone's safety. The episode "Marshmallow Madness" reveals that he has a severe addiction to marshmallows; he will be driven into an unstoppable, hunger-filled rage if he is ever close to the delicacies.
- Rosebud (voiced by Jonathan Wilson) is a short, bitter woman who resembles a serial killer with a German accent, serves as the camp's cook and the last counselor. She takes pride in her cooking; however, her meals are not only inedible but also frequently threaten the campers' lives. She is known to use whatever foul things she manages to find as ingredients in her meals. Squirt appears to be the only one who enjoys her cooking. She is the strictest counselor and least tolerant of McGee's antics; however, underneath it all, she means well. It was also revealed in her younger years that Rosebud used to be an infamous monster hunter for S.M.A.C.K. (Society of Monster Annihilation and Creature Kicking), but gave it up after her love for cooking when she met Sawyer and Armand, who tasked her with destroying all monsters in Lakebottom.
- Jordan Buttsquat (voiced by Carter Hayden) is the spoiled-rich son of the owner of "Camp Sunny Smiles" (Lakebottom's rival camp) and McGee's nemesis. He serves as the main antagonist of the series, constantly going to Camp Lakebottom in an attempt to wreck the rival camp or to mock the Bottom Dwellers' poor living conditions by showing off some new, fancy, high-tech item available at his camp. However, Buttsquat is severely lacking in the intellectual department, and McGee is able to outsmart him every time, which will lead him to say the recurring catchphrase "I will have revenge". McGee has saved Buttsquat's life on many occasions when his nemesis has been threatened by all monsters, but he never shows gratitude afterwards.
- Suzi (voiced by Bryn McAuley) is McGee's older sister, who is a pageant queen and became queen of "Sunny Smiles" on her first day. She is Gretchen's nemesis, who has held a grudge against her ever since she beat Gretchen in a beauty pageant. She has a crush on Buttsquat and often accompanies him in his schemes to thwart Lakebottom. She always refers to McGee as "Baby Bruv", and while the two siblings sometimes bicker, they are usually shown to care for each other. Despite having less evil intent than Buttsquat, there are many occasions when she has posed a far bigger threat to everyone's safety, as she tends to get entangled with one of the supernatural monsters or phenomena that have appeared. Examples of this include: "Stage Fright" where she uses stage bad luck and inadvertently summons an evil spirit which possesses her and nearly destroys Lakebottom. Another example is "28 Suzis Later" where she is cloned by a mystical mud, causing the camp to be overrun by Suzi clones.
- Slimey is a gigantic octopus-like creature who lives in the lake and is the most frequently appearing recurring character in the series. While he horrified the campers on their first appearance by grabbing them and tossing them in the air, it's revealed that he actually wants to play with them. He later becomes quite good friends with the campers, especially Squirt, and often entertains them by tossing them into the air while they're swimming so they can dive. He obeys any of the counselors and will quite often aid the campers during their adventures involving the lake. Only his tentacles are shown, so it is unknown what his body looks like.
- Portnoy (voiced by David Berni) is one of the two Sunny Smilers (the other being Sasha) who got kicked out of Sunny Smiles for not having platinum cards.
- Sasha Smithiwicks (voiced by Laurie Elliott) is one of the two Sunny Smilers (the other being Portnoy) who got kicked out of Sunny Smiles for not having platinum cards.

== Episodes ==
Season	Episodes	Originally released	
Season	Episodes	First released	Last released
1	26	July 4, 2013	October 30, 2014
2	26	March 2, 2015	August 15, 2016
3	13	July 3, 2017	July 24, 2017

== Telecast and home media ==
The show first premiered on Teletoon in Canada on July 4, 2013 and on Disney XD in the U.S. on July 13, 2013, with new episodes until October 16, 2014, and repeats until June 7, 2015, but seasons 2 and 3 have never aired in the U.S. The show airs on Disney Channels worldwide (except Portugal and where it airs on Biggs and RTP2), as well as on ABC in Australia. As of 2023, the show is streaming on Tubi.
