= List of Camp Lakebottom episodes =

Camp Lakebottom is a Canadian animated television series produced by 9 Story Media Group that premiered on Teletoon in Canada on July 4, 2013 and on Disney XD in the United States on July 13, 2013.

== Series overview ==
Season	Episodes	Originally released	
Season	Episodes	First released	Last released
1	26	July 4, 2013	October 30, 2014
2	26	March 2, 2015	August 15, 2016
3	13	July 3, 2017	July 24, 2017

== Episodes ==
=== Season 1 (2013–14) ===
No. overall	No. in season	Title	Written by	Storyboard by	Original release date
1a	1a	"Escape From Camp Lakebottom"	Shelley Hoffman & Robert Pincombe	Steve Stefanelli	July 4, 2013 (Teletoon); July 13, 2013 (Disney XD)
Three children named McGee, Gretchen, and Squirt accidentally wind up in a weird camp called Camp Lakebottom, only to find that they themselves are the main prey source for a food-wanting zombie with a chainsaw hand named Sawyer. A creative and smart angry Sasquatch named Armand, and a bizarre chef named Rosebud.
1b	1b	"Rise of the Bottom Dwellers"	Shelley Hoffman & Robert Pincombe	Jeff White	July 4, 2013 (Teletoon); July 13, 2013 (Disney XD)
McGee and Jordan Buttsquat cheatingly compete to see which camp is the best, but a race up a mountain disturbs a volcano that could wipe out the two camps at an alarming rate, so it's all up to Gretch to save the day.
2a	2a	"Late Afternoon of the Living Gitch"	Shelley Hoffman & Robert Pincombe	Jason Khober	July 11, 2013 (Teletoon); July 20, 2013 (Disney XD)
After Squirt's foul, smelly underwear becomes washed into a toxic cleanser, the gitch transforms hideously and leads the rest of the laundry on a goal of horror.
2b	2b	"Mindsuckers From the Depths"	Shelley Hoffman & Robert Pincombe	Steve Stefanelli	July 11, 2013 (Teletoon); July 20, 2013 (Disney XD)
When a giant, evil leech sticks itself to Squirt's head, he turns into a human-transformed villain hellbent on domination of the planet. Meanwhile, Buttsquat bans gum from Sunny Smiles.
3a	3a	"Jaws of Old Toothy"	Laurie Elliott	John Flagg	July 18, 2013 (Teletoon); July 27, 2013 (Disney XD)
When Sawyer closes a beach because of a sea-dwelling animal, McGee makes a promise to rid the ocean of this angry beast.
3b	3b	"Arachnattack"	Dave Dias	Robin Budd	July 18, 2013 (Teletoon); July 27, 2013 (Disney XD)
Despite Rosebud's disposal on pet animals, Squirt brings a baby spider back home, but it suddenly webs up Lakebottom in a silky cocoon for an easy, spidery prey item.
4a	4a	"Cluck of the Were Chicken"	Andrew Harrison	Jeff White	July 25, 2013 (Teletoon); August 3, 2013 (Disney XD)
When a monstrous chicken haunts the campsite, McGee must promise for the hunt to believe his innocence.
4b	4b	"Gnome Force"	Doug Hadders & Adam Rotstein	Steve Stefanelli	July 25, 2013 (Teletoon); August 3, 2013 (Disney XD)
A sneaky Buttsquat captures one of Rosebud's gnomes and McGee couldn't do less care, but his fears arise when a gnome squad arrives and turns the counselors into hostages.
5a	5a	"Stage Fright"	Shelley Hoffman & Robert Pincombe	Steve Stefanelli	August 1, 2013 (Teletoon); August 10, 2013 (Disney XD)
The Bottom Dwellers stage an awful play, but McGee's sister becomes jealous and unleashes an evil, magical curse on the whole production.
5b	5b	"Frankenfixer"	Doug Hadders & Adam Rotstein	Robin Budd	August 1, 2013 (Teletoon); August 10, 2013 (Disney XD)
McGee and the kids try to help Sawyer with his list and quickly finish off a Frankenstein.
6a	6a	"Cheeks of Dread"	Andrew Harrison	Jeff White	August 15, 2013 (Teletoon); August 17, 2013 (Disney XD)
Gretch must put a confrontation to her greatest fear when the Bottom Dwellers are trapped on a bizarre island with a man-eating beast.
6b	6b	"Doo Doo Doomsday"	Laurie Elliott	Jeremy O'Neill	August 15, 2013 (Teletoon); August 17, 2013 (Disney XD)
McGee's undenying thirst for toys and presents almost destroys the biggest holiday of the year when he ruffles the feathers of a magical creature known as a Permadactyl.
7a	7a	"Marshmallow Madness"	Doug Hadders & Adam Rotstein	Jeremy O'Neill	August 29, 2013 (Teletoon); August 24, 2013 (Disney XD)
The campers are threatened when Armand goes into a frenzy focusing on unsentient, wild marshmallows. However, they are too scared to ignore that horror, and eat the marshmallow bushes. They wake up and get mushroom lumps. If they itch it, it will create more marshmallows.
7b	7b	"28 Suzis Later"	Dave Dias	Jeff White	August 29, 2013 (Teletoon); August 24, 2013 (Disney XD)
McGee and the Bottom Dwellers are hopelessly outnumbered by their foe when she moves to Lakebottom along with her group of replicas.
8a	8a	"Pranks for Nothing"	Shawn Kalb	Helder Mendonca	September 5, 2013 (Teletoon); November 11, 2013 (Disney XD)
McGee releases a mischievous creature.
8b	8b	"Zombie Dearest"	Shelley Hoffman & Robert Pincombe	Steve Stefanelli	September 5, 2013 (Teletoon); November 11, 2013 (Disney XD)
Sawyer's mother moves to Lakebottom, much to Sawyer's dismay. McGee then suddenly realizes that she is a brain-eating creature.
9a	9a	"Terror From the Toybox"	Shawn Kalb	Jeff White	September 12, 2013 (Teletoon); August 5, 2013 (Disney XD)
Buttsquat's teddy bear falls to the bottom of Lake Icky Gloomy and is exposed to radiation, brainwashing the kids one by one.
9b	9b	"Slimeball Run"	Richard Clark	Jeremy O'Neill	September 12, 2013 (Teletoon); September 14, 2013 (Disney XD)
Eagerly impressed to win Buttsquat's awesome new racer, McGee makes a dare to him to cross a Lakebottom race, along with the cars and Lakebottom at stake.
10a	10a	"Bite of the Buttsquat"	Scott Oleszkowicz	Helder Mendonca	September 26, 2013 (Teletoon); September 21, 2013 (Disney XD)
When his only rival suddenly becomes a cool person, McGee is immediately suspicious of him being a vampire. Suddenly, the campers turn into vampires one by one.
10b	10b	"Sword of Ittibiticus"	Laurie Elliott	Steve Stefanelli	September 26, 2013 (Teletoon); August 12, 2013 (Disney XD)
The gang finds a frozen warrior inside.
11a	11a	"It's a Headless Horse, Man"	Jeremy Winkels	Jeremy O'Neill	October 3, 2013 (Teletoon); September 28, 2013 (Disney XD)
McGee is amazed when he wins a mounted head, until the head's evil horse body starts grabbing the Bottom Dweller's heads in a scary rampage.
11b	11b	"Voyage to the Bottom of the Deep"	Shawn Kalb	Jeff White	October 3, 2013 (Teletoon); August 19, 2013 (Disney XD)
McGee, Squirt and Gretch go into a submariner and land in an underground version of Lakebottom populated by fish versions of themselves.
12a	12a	"Pirates of Ickygloomy"	Scott Oleszkowicz	José Pou	October 17, 2013 (Teletoon); October 12, 2013 (Disney XD)
While playing a pirate game on a shipwreck, the Bottom Dwellers must fight a ghost pirate, who is angrily determined to win back the ship and control it.
12b	12b	"Attack of the 50-Foot Squirt"	Richard Clark	Steve Stefanelli	October 17, 2013 (Teletoon); October 12, 2013 (Disney XD)
After eating a delicious plant, Squirt grows into a hulking, giant monster, and a target for Buttsquat, who suddenly turns him against Gretch and McGee.
13a	13a	"Bloody Marty"	Kurt Firla	Jeremy O'Neill	October 24, 2013 (Teletoon); October 5, 2013 (Disney XD)
McGee, Squirt and Gretch release a person with a bloody shirt from the Mirror World. Soon, Gretch and Squirt are trapped, and McGee must rescue them.
13b	13b	"Ghost in the Mower"	Miles Smith	Josh Gay	October 24, 2013 (Teletoon); October 5, 2013 (Disney XD)
The Bottom Dwellers summon a ghostly monster to help take care of the soccer field. Soon, the ghost is angry when he takes his job seriously.
14a	14a	"Trouble in Spit Creek"	Aron Dunn	Steve Stefanelli	July 3, 2014 (Teletoon); October 26, 2013 (Disney XD)
During a frisbee game, McGee and Buttsquat get lost in a forest for what feels like days and must work together to survive the horrors of the riverside forests.
14b	14b	"The Spy Who Squatched Me"	Shawn Kalb	Jeff White	July 3, 2014 (Teletoon); October 26, 2013 (Disney XD)
The Bottom Dwellers discover that Armand was once an agent when they visit his hideaway at the top of a mountain. His old nemesis comes back to face him one last time in a battle of wits and dance moves.
15a	15a	"Ants in Our Camp"	Jenn Cowan	José Pou	July 10, 2014 (Teletoon); November 2, 2013 (Disney XD)
When McGee mistakenly concocts a spray that shrinks the campers to ant size, they meet a blue ant who agrees to help them navigate their way through this now dangerously giant world and return to normal.
15b	15b	"Fanboy Freakout"	Anita Kapila	Jeremy O'Neill	July 10, 2014 (Teletoon); November 2, 2013 (Disney XD)
McGe is desperate to win a hovercraft and enters a photo of Armand into a Sasquatch photo contest, but soon the gang must save Armand from a crazy hero.
16a	16a	"Are You My Mummy?"	Richard Clark	Josh Gay	July 17, 2014 (Teletoon); October 19, 2013 (Disney XD)
The Campers and Buttsquat come across an ancient pyramid inhabited by monsters known as mummies. The kids are soon sent running for their lives when Gretch is mistaken for the missing queen.
16b	16b	"Slimey Come Home"	John Slama	Steve Stefanelli	July 17, 2014 (Teletoon); October 19, 2013 (Disney XD)
Something large is lurking in Lake Ickygloomy and causing trouble for Deputy Buttsquat. Quick to blame the problems on their pal, McGee and the gang must prove his innocence.
17a	17a	"McGee the Mermaid"	Emer Connon	Jeff White	August 7, 2014 (Teletoon); September 30, 2014 (Disney XD)
The kids accidentally revive an evil mermaid, who floods the camp in her first step towards the domination of Earth.
17b	17b	"Welcome to Buttcon"	Laurie Elliott	José Pou	August 7, 2014 (Teletoon); September 30, 2014 (Disney XD)
When McGee, Gretch and Squirt sneak into Buttsquat's Sunny Smilers comic-con, it's not long before they start acting out scenes from their favorite sci-fi show.
18a	18a	"High Plains Garbage Eater"	Greg Lawrence	Steve Stefanelli	August 28, 2014 (Teletoon); October 8, 2014 (Disney XD)
It's Western Week at camp and the gang finds themselves in the middle of a good old fashioned show down with raccoon thugs, over garbage.
18b	18b	"Dream a Little Scream"	Robert Pincombe & Shelley Hoffman	Josh Gay	August 28, 2014 (Teletoon); October 8, 2014 (Disney XD)
The monsters tuck the campers in bed and warn them of the devious Dream Weevil. Taking the myth to heart, McGee finds himself in a wild, non-real dream where he learns to overcome his fears and protect his friends from the Weevil.
19a	19a	"The Superfantastic Mega-Buds"	Heather Jackson	Jeff White	September 4, 2014 (Teletoon); September 29, 2014 (Disney XD)
After touching a glowing orb from outer space, McGee, Gretch and Squirt become supers.
19b	19b	"It Came From My Nose"	Robert Pincombe & Shelley Hoffman	José Pou	September 4, 2014 (Teletoon); September 29, 2014 (Disney XD)
After a fit, McGee is haunted by a giant booger that wants to return home to his nose.
20a	20a	"McGee. T"	Evan Thaler Hickey	Jeff Barker	September 4, 2014 (Teletoon); December 5, 2013 (Disney XD)
McGee befriends a frog-like being that crash lands near Camp Lakebottom.
20b	20b	"The Great Tiki Hunt"	Shawn Kalb	José Pou	September 4, 2014 (Teletoon); December 5, 2013 (Disney XD)
McGee and his friends accidentally unleash an ancient Tiki idol. Although the idol initially seems a little nice, he soon gives the campers the honor of being his host in the Great Tiki Hunt.
21a	21a	"Camp Plantbottom"	Greg Lawrence	Steve Stefanelli	September 11, 2014 (Teletoon); October 15, 2014 (Disney XD)
It's Suzi's birthday and McGee ate her gift. Desperate to find her another gift, McGee grows a mutant plant using Rosebud's special fertilizer.
21b	21b	"Game Over"	Robert Pincombe & Shelley Hoffman	Ian Westoby	September 11, 2014 (Teletoon); October 15, 2014 (Disney XD)
When the kids play a video game, they are transported into the game. When Buttsquat plays the game, he is turned into a giant bad guy and makes some of the camp disappear so the kids need to stop him and return camp to normal.
22a	22a	"Clockwork Slime"	Stephen Senders	Blair Kitchen	September 18, 2014 (Teletoon); October 16, 2014 (Disney XD)
The campers find a time-travelling clock and take a trip through Camp Lakebottom's past and future. They save the camp from Buttsquat, who turns a slime geyser into a goldmine!
22b	22b	"Ride the Haunted Howler"	Jennifer Daley	Jordan Voth	October 2, 2014 (Teletoon); October 16, 2014 (Disney XD)
McGee worries that camp has raised his fear tolerance too high.
23a	23a	"Buttastic Journey"	Shawn Kalb	Jeff White	October 9, 2014 (Teletoon); September 22, 2014 (Disney XD)
McGee shrinks to the size of an atom. When Buttsquat drinks him in a smoothie, McGee ends up controlling his brain.
23b	23b	"Monkey See, Monkey Kung Fu"	Anita Kapila	José Pou	October 9, 2014 (Teletoon); September 22, 2014 (Disney XD)
Gretchen seeks help from Rosebud when she loses her Kung Fu Chi, and ends up fighting the legendary Dark Monkey Kung Fu Master.
24a	24a	"Red Drawn"	Miles Smith	Steve Stefanelli	October 16, 2014 (Teletoon); September 23, 2014 (Disney XD)
A travelling salesman visits the camp one rainy day and sells McGee a magic pencil. When his drawings start to come to life and overrun the camp McGee must erase his monster mistake.
24b	24b	"Pandora's Jock"	Evan Thaler Hickey	Josh Gay	October 16, 2014 (Teletoon); September 23, 2014 (Disney XD)
In the hope of beating his rivals at the first ever Ickygloomy Slopstical Course Race, McGee summons a trainer to help him shape up.
25a	25a	"Ring Around the Gretchen"	Kurt Firla	José Pou	October 23, 2014 (Teletoon); September 24, 2014 (Disney XD)
Gretchen lets McGee give her a makeover.
25b	25b	"Chili Con Carnage"	Seán Cullen	Jordan Voth	October 23, 2014 (Teletoon); September 24, 2014 (Disney XD)
McGee grows tired of Rosebud's cooking.
26a	26a	"Valley of the Iguanasquat"	Robert Pincombe & Shelley Hoffman	Steve Stefanelli	October 30, 2014 (Teletoon); September 25, 2014 (Disney XD)
The Bottom Dwellers search for a lost crystal, but soon, they realize that the thing can transform people into their prehistoric states, with the thing first happening on Buttsquat.
26b	26b	"The Legend of Wiggly's Gold"	Seán Cullen	Jordan Voth	October 30, 2014 (Teletoon); September 25, 2014 (Disney XD)
The Bottom Dwellers venture into a cavern during a treasure hunt.

=== Season 2 (2015–16) ===
No. overall	No. in season	Title	Written by	Storyboard by	Original release date
27a	1a	"Adventures in Bottomland"	Heather Jackson	Alexei Kazakov	March 2, 2015
During an unfair match, McGee falls into a hole and finds himself in a strange world.
27b	1b	"Golem My Way"	Shawn Kalb	Rob Clark	March 2, 2015
While doing arts and crafts, McGee creates a living clay golem that will follow his command.
28a	2a	"S.P.U.D.S."	Evan Thaler Hickey	Rob Walton	March 9, 2015
After McGee, Gretch and Squirt argue with Suzi and Buttsquat over a patch of potatoes, they accidentally anger the potato king who lives under the potato patch with his collection of potato henchmen.
28b	2b	"Monster Hunters "R" Us"	Shelley Hoffman & Robert Pincombe	Cilbur Rocha	March 9, 2015
When McGee discovers a strange beacon, he summons a woman from an alternate dimension, an evil version of Rosebud who never quit her job as a monster hunter.
29a	3a	"Golfadoom (Unfairway of Doom)"	Laurie Elliott	Alexei Kazakov	March 16, 2015
When McGee, Gretch and Buttsquat all sink a hole-in-one, they summon Haggis, a ghoulish golfer who challenges the campers to a round of golfing. The catch is, if the campers lose … they get trapped in the tree of doom forever.
29b	3b	"There is Something About Mamba"	Anita Kapila	Wade Konowalacuk	March 16, 2015
When McGee convinces Sawyer to spruce up his Creepbook account, Sawyer attracts Anna, who comes to visit. But soon, it's revealed that she's a snake.
30a	4a	"Eclipsalypso"	Josh Sager & Jerome Simpson	Rob Walton	March 23, 2015
When McGee accidentally puts an ancient calendar on a player in a dance class, he summons the all-destroying Moon Dervish. Luckily, Armand knows the dance. Unfortunately, McGee puts Armand in a sleepy trance by giving him weird tea.
30b	4b	"Apocalypse Squirt"	Scott Oleszkowicz	Alexei Kazakov	March 23, 2015
When McGee savagely asks Squirt to get rid of his animals, it leads to a falling out between the best buds. Squirt leaves Lakebottom with his animals. McGee and Gretch set upriver in a coffin to bring their pal back, but they discover a shocking truth: Squirt has become a wild Indian and now set-up Squirtopia, a savage, McGee-hating society.
31a	5a	"Itchy Witchy Pizza Project"	Heather Jackson	Cilbur Rocha	March 30, 2015
Gretch is hungry for pizza, and a plane for a pizza palace appears. The plane leads Gretch, McGee and Squirt to a house owned by a mysterious creature. But before Gretch can eat a slice of pizza, the creature traps the campers and forces them into becoming her family. But soon, she is about to learn the hard way: no one will mess with a mean Gretch.
31b	5b	"Breakout From Buttvault B"	Aron Dunn	Rob Clark	March 30, 2015
After Suzi gives Buttsquat a rare doll, McGee becomes furious and attempts to steal it back from his rival.
32a	6a	"Scare-a-Normal Activity"	Evan Thaler Hickey	Cilbur Rocha	March 30, 2015
Eager to impress Edna Spangler, Gretch insists on giving her favourite celebrity a tour of Lakebottom, so it's up to McGee to hide all the creepy bits of Lakebottom. But Edna grows angry when she encounters paranormal plans happening in the camp.
32b	6b	"Beast Feast"	Shawn Kalb	Rob Walton	March 30, 2015
When an elderly former Lakebottomer, Poe, comes to camp hoping to meet up with an old friend, Lou, for the annual ‘Beast Feast’, the campers venture to the old Camp Lakebottom to search for Lou's long-lost pal. When Lou finally does arrive at Lakebottom, he turns out to be not a human at all, but a dragon. The campers are going to need every obedience trick possible to tame Lou!
33a	7a	"Big Top Terror"	Laurie Elliott	Alexei Kazakov	July 8, 2015
When McGee find a painting of a clown and put it in his cabin. The campers accidentally summon the spirit of Doofus the clown. Doofus arrives at Lakebottom and insists on becoming the camp circus coach. But soon, Doofus's ghost begins to intentionally endanger the campers.
33b	7b	"Slimal Fear"	Josh Sager & Jerome Simpson	Michelle Ku	July 8, 2015
When McGee prepares slime for the best prank ever, sliming the entirety of Camp Sunny Smiles, he accidentally mixes different toxic slimes and it becomes a humongous, living Mega Slime. The mission suddenly ends when the gigantic slime transforms Buttsquat and the inhabitants of Camp Sunny Smiles into monsters called Slime Zombies.
34a	8a	"Who's Ghouling Who"	Evan Thaler Hickey	Rob Walton	July 15, 2015
Eager to beat out Gretch for the title of "Scare and Freak Champ", McGee accidentally summons a friendly ghost who secretly helps Gretch prank McGee.
34b	8b	"The Abominable Dr. Squatch"	Richard Clark	Cilbur Rocha	July 15, 2015
When the campers are bored to tears during another Lakebottom movie night screening of the camp's only film, How Not to Repair a Lawnmower, McGee vows to help Armand film his masterpiece, The Abominable Dr. Squatch. While putting up with Armand's diva like ways prove to be quite the challenge, filming takes a dramatic turn when a special effect turns out to be an enormous floating eye that threatens to kill them all if they complete the movie, or if they don't complete it.
35a	9a	"Schwampbillies"	Evan Thaler Hickey	Alexei Kazakov	July 22, 2015
When McGee, Gretch and Squirt find themselves lost deep in the swamp, McGee and Gretch argue about the right way back to Lakebottom... until they get separated end up on opposite ends of a long-time feud between voracious rivals Jillybilly and Phillbilly.
35b	9b	"Remember Fort Sunnybottom"	Josh Sager & Jerome Simpson	Rob Walton	July 22, 2015
During a trip to the historic Camp Sunnybottom, Sawyer informs the campers that Sunny Smiles and Camp Lakebottom were once one camp, but a capture the flag game turned ugly and split the camp into two.
36a	10a	"Seven Foot Itch"	Nicole Demerse	Cilbur Rocha	July 29, 2015
After the camp gets overrun with a case of the Lakebottom Lousys, Squirt becomes attached to one member of the gang-- Warren. Rosebud uses her sure-fire de-lousy spray to rid the camp of the hideous Lousys. But when Warren dies in the crossfire, Squirt brings back Warren from the grave using an ancient Lakebottom ritual.
36b	10b	"Being McGee"	Shelley Hoffman & Robert Pincombe	Rob Walton	July 29, 2015
When McGee and Buttsquat accidentally break an amulet, it casts a spell that causes them to become Buttgee and McSquat. Buttgee is desperate to reverse it, and McSquat is trying his best to live the rest of his days as McGee. But when McSquat realizes that the Bottom Dwellers will never like him for who he is, he plans to destroy Camp Lakebottom with his super-charged squatrock.
37a	11a	"Messie Bessie"	Laurie Elliott	Alexei Kazakov	August 5, 2015
When the campers build a race car so that Sawyer can relive his pro-racing days, Sawyer feels haunted by his maniac girlfriend, Messy Bessie. Sawyer grows increasingly worried by McGee's sudden attachment to this new race car. But he has more to worry about when the spirit of Bessie indeed reveals herself and attempts to lure him back by possessing McGee.
37b	11b	"Nanny Num Nums (Nanny McFear)"	Anita Kapila	Rick Marshall	August 5, 2015
After Nanny Num Nums comes to Lakebottom to care for an ill Rosebud, McGee discovers that with a little magic, Lakebottom chores could actually be kind of fun. But the following day, McGee wakes up looking strange. Desperate for answers, the campers sneak into the quarantined kitchen to discover Rosebud, who reveals that they are turning older.
38a	12a	"Pod Parents"	Evan Thaler Hickey	Cilbur Rocha	August 12, 2015
When McGee and Suzi's parents come to visit Camp Lakebottom, Suzi is determined to expose Camp Lakebottom in all of its spookiness. McGee is pleasantly surprised when his parents adjust well to Lakebottom, until he discovers that these aren't his real parents at all. They're pod parent clones who have captured their real parents.
38b	12b	"Zombie Scouts"	Josh Sager & Jerome Simpson	Rob Walton	August 12, 2015
The campers train to be Sawyer's scouts, unaware that their smoke signal exercise has summoned Sawyer's troop leader.
39a	13a	"Cabin Fever"	Shelley Hoffman & Robert Pincombe	Dave Thomas	August 19, 2015
While lost in the woods, McGee, Gretch, Squirt and Sawyer discover a creepy cabin inhabited by a strange caretaker. McGee thinks they have hit the haunted house jackpot when creepy horror tropes unfold throughout the story.
39b	13b	"It's a Horrible Life"	Evan Thaler Hickey	Cilbur Rocha	August 19, 2015
McGee experiences what Lakebottom would be like if he never existed.
40a	14a	"Bird Brains"	Shawn Kalb	Alexei Kazakov	August 19, 2015
While bird watching on Black Beak Island, the campers encounter Squirt's childhood idol, Dr. Sapstein. Squirt is honoured to assist his idol on his mission to locate the rare mocker bird. But he soon discovers that Sapstein plans to use the mocker bird for an experiment.
40b	14b	"The Real Vincent"	Steph Kaliner	Rob Walton	August 19, 2015
When McGee finds a paint brush while snooping through Armand's cabin, he gives it to Sawyer to help him unleash his inner artist. The campers are impressed by Sawyer's creations. But soon, Sawyer decides that living life forms are the key to masterfully realistic art.
41a	15a	"McCrossroads (Bandshee)"	Josh Saltzman	Cilbur Rocha	August 20, 2015
When McGee vows to out rock Buttsquat for Best Camp Song, he signs a contract with Sheba in exchange for Gretch's private song lyrics. McHardcore loves the limelight but soon realizes that he'll be the opening act on Sheba's tour bus for all eternity.
41b	15b	"Lucky Duck"	Evan Thaler Hickey	Alexei Kazakov	August 20, 2015
When McGee's beloved rubber lucky ducky, Mad Skillz, goes missing, he loses a series of scare bear dares to Buttsquat and deems himself too dangerous for Lakebottom. But when Gretch and Squirt identify Buttsquat as the duck-snatcher, they chase the newly confident Buttsquat across the gory gorge tightrope.
42a	16a	"When Suzis Attack (McGreen with Envy)"	Nicole Demerse	Rob Walton	August 24, 2015
After Suzi gets bitten by jealousy bugs, her eyes turn monstrous and she becomes uncharacteriscally nice to the humans. McGee is happy that Suzi is finally playing nice with his friends. But when Suzi's rage meter rises, she grows to the size of a Concavenator and snatches McGee's friends.
42b	16b	"How to Potty Train Your Dragon"	Steph Kaliner	Cilbur Rocha	August 25, 2015
McGee tries takes care of a young dragon.
43a	17a	"Hiccups"	Doug Hadders & Adam Rotstein	Alexei Kazakov	August 26, 2015
During a hike, the campers fill Rosebud's shopping list and discover rare brakberries that only grow on the shore of Soda Shwamp Falls. McGee eats the brakberries and his body quakes resulting in a massive problem. When things start disappearing around Lakebottom, the campers quickly realize McGee's hiccups are the cause.
43b	17b	"Boogeyman Fever"	Nicole Demerse	John Flagg	August 27, 2015
McGee reads a kids' book to help Squirt overcome his childhood fear, unaware that he has freed the story's main character. Seeing that shadows lurk throughout the whole camp, Squirt tries to warn his friends.
44a	18a	"Fright Club"	Evan Thaler Hickey	Rob Walton	August 28, 2015
During a storm, the campers discover an enchanted flashlight and tell disturbing stories. McGee refuses to believe in the Dripper, an evil figure that haunts Camp Lakebottom.
44b	18b	"Bottom Dome"	Robert Pincombe & Shelley Hoffman	Cilbur Rocha	August 28, 2015
After Junk Queen Suzi steals the legendary Monster Compass that leads to the lost Lakebottom oasis, the Bottom rebels must venture to Camp Sunny Sneer to reclaim what's rightfully theirs. In the Sunny Sneer junk castle, the rebels find themselves running away from a monster.
45a	19a	"The Day Squirt Stood Still"	Shawn Kalb	Brian Coughlan	March 7, 2016
When the campers track down a UFO, an alien clone of Squirt called Squont bows to Squirt. McGee and Gretch travel undercover aboard the ship to witness Squirt's rule, but Sqount soon reveals his plan to sacrifice Squirt to the planet's Squn.
45b	19b	"Anti Gravity"	Robert Pincombe & Shelley Hoffman	Alexei Kazakov	March 7, 2016
While traveling through space, a captain discovers an escape pod and rescues another captain. The two young captains argue over control of the ship. But when the distressed captain collapses and a green alien worm shoots out of his forehead, the team must stop themselves from being controlled by the worms.
46a	20a	"Slaybells"	Robert Pincombe & Shelley Hoffman	Cilbur Rocha	March 8, 2016
The Bottom Dwellers are excited about an awesome holiday named Eekmas, where everyone decorates the camp for the arrival of a creature called Rumple Krumple Klaws. The campers warn the kids to be on their best behaviour since the Meter will inform Rumple Krumple if the kids have been naughty or nice.
46b	20b	"Smells Like Holidays"	Josh Saltzman	Rob Walton	March 9, 2016
McGee blames Squirt for an accident on the eve of Eekmas. That night, McGee is visited by spirits resembling his friends.
47a	21a	"Last Days"	Shawn Kalb	Brian Coughlan	March 10, 2016
The Bottom Dwellers are visited by a nerdy camper who tells them that it's the last day of Camp Lakebottom. As the mysterious camper uses his scythe to score points to level up his Grim Ranger status, McGee vows to protect his camp and everything in it.
47b	21b	"Knock on Wood"	Nicole Demerse	Alexei Kazakov	March 10, 2016
While rummaging through the attic, the campers uncover a suitcase, unaware that they have unleashed an evil dummy- Elmer. Squirt immediately teams up with Elmer to become the new Lakebottom ventriloquism comedy duo.
48a	22a	"Duh’Rehka"	Aron Dunn	Rob Walton	March 11, 2016
When gopher holes appear all over the Lakebottom camp, Sawyer builds a gopher trap to finally conquer Cletus. In his eagerness to succeed, Sawyer chases Cletus into the brain bin and reemerges super smart. But soon, Cletus reemerges with a black hole device with enough power to sink Camp Lakebottom.
48b	22b	"Chore Leave"	Robert Pincombe & Shelley Hoffman; Teleplay by : Steph Kaliner	Cilbur Rocha	March 14, 2016
After Rosebud is sent off for a long overdue spa day, Sawyer and Armand are left in charge of the long list of Lakebottom chores: watering the monstermatoes, vacuuming dusty bunnies and pushing the big, red button. But when the two counselors come down with the 24-hour Sicky Spec Flu, McGee promises to complete the list of chores. When McGee fails to press the big, red button, a big, giant foot kicks open the gate and stomps towards the camp.
49a	23a	"Ice Queen"	Robert Pincombe & Shelley Hoffman	Brian Coughlan	March 15, 2016
Eager to reclaim their lost Lakebottom items, the campers break into the Sunny Smiles storage locker and confront an angered Suzi. But soon, a snow globe with Ittybittycus, embedded inside breaks and bonks Suzi, turning her into a mean ice queen. Thinking he's a puppy, Suzi enrages the minitaur by taking away his sword and turns Sunny Smiles into her kingdom.
49b	23b	"Live and Let Squatch"	Story by : Robert Pincombe & Shelley Hoffman; Teleplay by : Josh Sager & Jerome Simpson	Alexei Kazakov	March 16, 2016
When Armand's distressed old spy nemesis arrives at Lakebottom, she offers up a secret, coded recipe for brownies in exchange for her protection.
50a	24a	"Tooth Troll"	Richard Clark	Rob Walton	March 17, 2016
When McGee discovers Squirt has a loose baby tooth, he convinces Squirt that losing baby teeth is an awesome part of growing up. But soon, Squirt is visited by the evil, male-voiced Tooth Troll who takes him to her tooth lair. As it turns out, Squirt's baby tooth has enough energy to summon all the teeth in the world.
50b	24b	"Hive and Seek"	Evan Thaler Hickey	Alexei Kazakov	March 18, 2016
After Gretch gets chased by the Queen Zombee into the honey porter, she sniffs flowers, seems abnormally strong and she strangely buzzes with energy. Seeing Gretch sprout wings and a stinger, McGee witnesses her turn into the Queen Zombee.
51a	25a	"Slugfight at Bottom Gulch"	Robert Pincombe & Shelley Hoffman	Rob Walton	August 15, 2016
When Buttsquat discovers the deed to claim Lakebottom, he insists the Bottom Dwellers clear off his land. Long ago, Sawyer staked a claim on Lakebottom Gulch, but the deed was stolen by Grandpappy Black Butt. Now, the campers must travel back in time to prevent Grandpappy Black Butt from stealing the deed.
51b	25b	"I Zomborg"	Robert Pincombe & Shelley Hoffman	Cilbur Rocha	August 15, 2016
When Buttsquat sends a spybot drone programmed to destroy the Bottom Dwellers, Sawyer's low-tech arm gimmicks are no match for the drone's tech. Soon, McGee is visited by his future self who warns him that something bad is going happen. Ignoring the other McGee's warning, the real McGee salvages the drone's high-tech chip and inserts it into Sawyer's arm. The chip transforms Sawyer into a villainous Zomborg, hell-bent on taking out the campers and destroying the entire camp.
52a	26a	"Head Two Head"	Evan Thaler Hickey	Cilbur Rocha	August 15, 2016
After Sawyer's chimera glue fuses Suzi and Gretch, they turn into a Gruzi. The bickering Suzi and Gretch try to have their own normal day, until they run into a ferocious vulture mixed with a turtle.
52b	26b	"The Last of the Wild"	Aron Dunn	Stan Gadziola	August 15, 2016
When Armand is visited by the Sasquatch Society, he learns that his outdoor foot classification is being changed to Cityfoot if he doesn't upgrade his outdoor classification.

=== Season 3 (2017) ===
No. overall	No. in season	Title	Written by	Storyboard by	Original release date
53a	1a	"Sweat, Hot Lakebottom Summer"	Andrew Harrison	Michelle Ku	July 3, 2017
McGee uses anti-sweat cream, but it backfires and makes him sweat even more.
53b	1b	"The S'mogre"	Jennifer Daley	Paul Bouchard	July 3, 2017
McGee becomes a s'mores monster.
54a	2a	"Camp Lockdownbottom"	Jerome Simpson & Josh Sager	Luke Gustafson	July 4, 2017
Rosebud takes charge of the camp and puts it on lockdown after her golden ladle goes missing.
54b	2b	"All You Need Is Larva"	Sam Ruano; Story by : Robert Pincombe & Shelley Hoffman	Alexei Kazakov	July 4, 2017
Squirt develops a case of worms.
55a	3a	"Meet the Gretch's Parents"	Steph Kaliner	Michelle Ku	July 5, 2017
Gretch's famous action-hero, movie-star parents visit Camp Lakebottom, and wind up getting a dramatic motivation they never dreamed of.
55b	3b	"Now with 100% More Portal"	Shawn Kalb	Paul Bouchard	July 5, 2017
The kids discover an inter-dimensional portal that takes them to a similar Lakebottom, where their inter-dimensional alter-egos are all Zombies!
56a	4a	"Lakebo-Tron"	Andrew Harrison	Luke Gustafson	July 6, 2017
Buttsquat and McGee get digitized into a classic 80's video game and take on the game's software guardian to escape.
56b	4b	"Rise of the Dawn of the Beginning of the Planet of Armand!"	Jerome Simpson & Josh Sager	Alexei Kazakov	July 6, 2017
The bottomdwellers travel through the interdimensional portal to an all-Sasquatch version of Camp Lakebottom.
57a	5a	"McGee's First Flush"	Jennifer Daley	Michelle Ku	July 10, 2017
The campers face the wrath of two mutated Ocean Apes, once the pets of McGee and Suzi, now seeking for revenge after being flushed years ago.
57b	5b	"House of Ear Wax"	Charles Johnson	Craig Taillefer	July 10, 2017
Squirt's ear wax comes to life and hypnotizes Squirt into replacing his friends with sculpted ear wax replicas.
58a	6a	"Butt-Squad"	Kyle Hart	Luke Gustafson	July 11, 2017
Buttsquat brianwashes the kids to become his warriors.
58b	6b	"You Sank My Battle Squirt"	Ian MacIntyre	Alexei Kazakov	July 11, 2017
An alien ship invades the camp.
59a	7a	"I, Rodent"	Sam Ruano	Michelle Ku	July 12, 2017
The gang become squirrels to answer for their crimes against the squirrel community.
59b	7b	"Undies Cover of the Night"	Jerome Simpson & Josh Sager	Craig Taillefer	July 12, 2017
McGee makes a dream come true and the kids try to intervene.
60a	8a	"Afterlife of the Party"	Steph Kaliner	Luke Gustafson	July 13, 2017
The kids stop partying due to the Party Animal.
60b	8b	"F.L.O.P.P.Y the Elephant"	Sam Ruano	Neil Affleck	July 13, 2017
The kids befriend a lost circus elephant.
61a	9a	"Tur-Keepin' It Real"	Charles Johnston	Alexei Kazakov	July 17, 2017
The kids get trapped in a different dimension populated by giant Turkeysaurus Rexes.
61b	9b	"Little Saint Nicky"	Jeff Sager	Luke Gustafson	July 17, 2017
Santa Claus crash lands in the camp and McGee tries to help get him out.
62a	10a	"Nostril-Damus!"	Sam Ruano	Craig Taillefer	July 18, 2017
McGee catches a cold, which gives him the ability to tell fortunes.
62b	10b	"Working Over-Slime"	Jeff Sager	Luke Gustafson	July 18, 2017
The kids discover that Slimey is secretly hanging out with the bottomlukers.
63a	11a	"The Old Man and the McGee"	Mike Girard	Alex Greychuck	July 19, 2017
An older McGee travels back in time to change the past and stop the staff from becoming bloodthirsty monsters.
63b	11b	"Operation: McMom"	Doug Hadders & Adam Rotstein	Alexei Kazakov	July 19, 2017
The gang visits McGee's town to find out what happened to his parents.
64	12	"The Lakebottom House of Horrors! Mwa Ha, Ha!"	Shawn Kalb Steph Kaliner	Alexei Kazakov Craig Taillefer	July 20, 2017
The kids enter a Lakebottom House of Horrors only to discover that they will soon be the house's star attractions, and they fight their way through the Lakebottom House of Horrors to a final showdown with Gluteus Crouch.
65	13	"The Camp Lakebottom Classic"	Shawn Kalb	Craig Taillefer Alex Greychuck	July 24, 2017
In the series finale, it's the last week of summer and the kids volunteer as staff-in-training to help with the unexpected arrival of two new campers until Buttsquat takes over the camp, and the gang challenges Buttsquat to the Lakebottom Classic for true ownership of Lakebottom one last time.
