= Liza Balkan =

Canadian actress

Liza Balkan is a Canadian Theatre Artist, Director, Educator, Writer and Actor

== Career ==
She received Toronto's Dora Mavor Moore Award for her performance in Still the Night (Theatre Passe Muraille/Tova Entertainment/Tapestry/National Tour). She is also known as the voice actress for Amy Mizuno from the third and fourth seasons of the English adaptation of Sailor Moon.

On the silver screen, she had a role in Asghar Massombagi's Khaled (2001) and appeared in Atom Egoyan's critically acclaimed drama Remember (2015), portraying the daughter-in-law of Christopher Plummer's protagonist in the latter.

Balkan teaches at the University of Windsor, located in Windsor, Ontario.

Directing credits

- Opera Brief's 6 & 7 (Tapestry New Opera Works)
- Skylight and Trying (Persephone Theatre)
- Half an Hour (Shaw Festival Director's Project)
- Bunnicula (Theatre Athena)
- Orchids (Marquis Ent.)
- Good Woman of Setzuan
- Enemies (premiere, Ryerson Theatre School )
- Pavlov's Brother (Toronto Fringe Festival)

Performances

- Sylvia (Belfry Theatre)
- It's All True (Great Canadian Theatre Company)
- The Winter's Tale (National Arts Centre)
- The Stronger Variations (Theatre Rusticle/Harbourfront)
- Golda's Balcony (Winnipeg Jewish Theatre)
- West Side Story (Kennedy Center, Washington, D.C.)

Voice roles

- Sailor Moon (Sailor Mercury/Amy Mizuno)

== See also ==
- List of Canadian actors
- List of Canadian directors
- List of people from Windsor, Ontario

Preceded by Karen Bernstein	Voice of Sailor Mercury; Eps. 83 - 159	Succeeded by Kate Higgins
