= The Hunted (2013 film) =

- Directed by: Josh Stewart
- Written by: Josh Stewart
- Produced by: Brett Forbes; Patrick Rizzotti; Jeffrey Tinnell
- Starring: Josh Stewart; Skipp Sudduth; Katherine Von Till
- Cinematography: Gilbert Salas
- Edited by: William Yeh
- Music by: Walter Werzowa
- Production companies: Fortress Features; Allegheny Image Factory
- Distributed by: Entertainment One
- Release dates: October 10, 2013 (Screamfest); September 9, 2014 (DVD)
- Running time: 89 minutes
- Country: United States
- Language: English

The Hunted is a 2013 found footage thriller film and the directorial debut of American actor Josh Stewart. Stewart stars in the film and also penned its script. The Hunted had its world premiere on October 10, 2013 at Screamfest and was planned for release on home video on September 9, 2014. The movie casts Stewart along with Ronnie Gene Blevins as two hunters that find themselves becoming quarry for an unknown enemy.

== Synopsis ==
Hoping for fame, Jake (Josh Stewart) and Stevie (Ronnie Gene Blevins) have decided to film a pilot for a hunting show deep in a secluded forest. They've set their eyes on a large, impressive buck nicknamed "Movie Star", which Jake believes will ensure that their show will get picked up for distribution. Failing at this task is not an option, so Jake goes to lengths to ensure that nothing will spoil their hunt or ruin the footage. Despite this, things do not go according to plan and the duo finds that their dreams of stardom are easily waylaid by malfunctioning equipment, strange occurrences, and the pervasive feeling that they're truly not welcome in the forest. As the hunt progresses, Stevie begins to suspect that something more sinister is at play.

== Cast ==
- Josh Stewart as Jake
- Skipp Sudduth as Tony
- Katherine Von Till as Ghost
- Ronnie Gene Blevins as Stevie
- Nikki DeLoach as Ashlee
- Brett Forbes as Lucky
- Jessi Blue Gormezano as Jessi
- Patrick Rizzotti as Dale
- Jim Stallings as Radio Newscaster

== Development ==
Stewart was first inspired to create The Hunted after having an unnerving experience during a hunting trip in West Virginia. While developing the characters of Jake and Stevie, Stewart tried to make them likable as he felt that hunters in film were "always made out to be the idiots or the rednecks". This clashed with his own perception of what hunters are like, as he hunted frequently while he was growing up. Stewart also tried to give Stevie and Jake reasons to continue filming while undergoing stress during the course of the film, as most people would not continue to film under extreme circumstances. He chose to make Stevie a news cameraman, as Stewart saw them as being more likely to continue filming while under duress, as their job is "to shoot the story no matter what the story is", which he thought would be more believable.

== Reception ==
Shock Till You Drop gave The Hunted a favorable review, praising the movie's sound and commending Stewart for creating characters that they found likable. Fearnet was somewhat more divided in their review, writing that "The Hunted has a decent story, a creepy setting, and some solid actors but there's simply no escaping how familiar this "found footage" forest feels by now."
