= Pippi Longstocking (1997 TV series) =

1997 animated television series

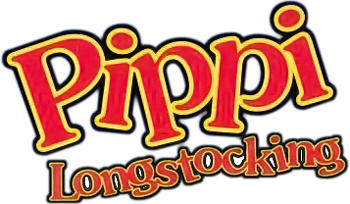
- Pippi Langstrumpf; Pippi Långstrump
- Genre: Adventure; Comedy
- Based on: Pippi Longstocking by Astrid Lindgren
- Directed by: Paul Riley
- Voices of: Melissa Altro; Richard Binsley; Noah Reid; Olivia Garratt; Len Carlson; Wayne Robson; Rick Jones; Philip Williams; Ben Campbell; Chris Wiggins; Jill Frappier; Karen Bernstein; Ray Landry
- Opening theme: "What Shall I Do Today?" performed by Melissa Altro (Note: Brent Barkman, Emily Barlow, Marieve Herington, Michael Hughes, Carl Lenox, Annick Obonsawn, Scott Pietrangelo, Clive Smith, Tim Thorney, and Tom Thorney are credited as group singers in the movie, which originally features the song.)
- Ending theme: "What Shall I Do Today?" (instrumental)
- Composers: Great Big Music: Tom Thorney; Tim Thorney; Brent Barkman; Carl Lenox
- Countries of origin: Canada; Germany; Sweden
- Original language: English (Note: The three series writers Ken Sobol, John Sobol, and Robert Stutt were all based in Canada, and have written for English-language projects.)
- No. of seasons: 2
- No. of episodes: 26

Production
- Executive producers: Michael Hirsh; Patrick Loubert; Clive A. Smith; Michael Schaack; Lennart Wiklund
- Running time: 22 minutes
- Production companies: AB Svensk Filmindustri; TaurusFilm; TFC Trickompany Filmproduktion; Nelvana Limited

Original release
- Network: Teletoon (Canada); ZDF (Germany); SVT1 (Sweden)
- Release: October 17, 1997 – September 26, 1998

Related
- Pippi Longstocking (1997 film)

Pippi Longstocking is an animated television series co-produced by AB Svensk Filmindustri, TaurusFilm, TFC Trickompany Filmproduktion, and Nelvana Limited based on the book series drawn and written by Swedish author Astrid Lindgren. It is a joint Canadian-German-Swedish co-production. This was the first time that the popular character had been animated.

A spin-off and continuation of the 1997 animated film of the same name, Melissa Altro, Richard Binsley, Noah Reid, Olivia Garratt, Wayne Robson, Rick Jones, Philip Williams, Chris Wiggins and Karen Bernstein are the only voice cast reprising their roles from the film. It was led by German director Michael Schaack.

The story editor and chief writer for the series was Ken Sobol, a prolific children's television writer who was handpicked by Lindgren herself to head the series, with his son John also writing episodes under his guidance. Together they wrote all but three episodes, with this remainder credited to Robert Stutt, and movie screenwriter Catharina Stackelberg also co-writing one episode and serving as script supervisor.

Although generally episodic outside the premiere and finale, the series also features two story arcs consisting of multiple episodes: "Pippi Goes to the South Seas", "Pippi Meets Some Pearl Poachers", and "Pippi Goes Home"; and "Pippi Doesn't Go to School", "Pippi Goes Up North", "Pippi Saves the Whales – Again", and "Pippi Goes to School – Or Does She?". The first of these were combined into the film-length Pippi's Adventures on the South Seas, released on VHS and DVD by HBO Home Video.

== Cast ==
- Melissa Altro as Pippi Longstocking
- Richard Binsley as Mr. Nilsson
- Noah Reid as Tommy Settergren
- Olivia Garratt as Annika Settergren
- Len Carlson as Thunder-Karlsson
- Wayne Robson as Bloom
- Rick Jones as Constable Kling
- Philip Williams as Constable Klang
- Ben Campbell as Captain Ephraim Longstocking
- Chris Wiggins as Fridolf
- Jill Frappier as Mrs. Prysselius
- Karen Bernstein as Mrs. Ingrid Settergren
- Ray Landry as Mr. Settergren

== Episodes ==
The series aired for two seasons, with 26 half-hour episodes being made in total.

=== Season 1 (1997–98) ===
No. overall	No. in season	Title	Written by	Storyboard by	Original U.S. air date
1	1	"Pippi Returns to Villa Villekulla"	Ken Sobol	Bob Smith	October 17, 1997
Pippi Longstocking arrives in a small Swedish town to take up residence in Villa Villekulla with her companions, Horse and Mr. Nilsson (a monkey). Pippi encounters snooty Mrs. Prysselius; befriends Tommy and Annika, siblings that live next door to her house; and teaches Bengt the bully a lesson. When the police arrive to take Pippi to the children's home, she plays with them a little bit and in the end, the policemen decide that Pippi would be best off where she is, but Mrs. Prysselius states that things will never quite be the same again with Pippi around.
2	2	"Pippi Entertains Two Burglars"	Ken Sobol	Dan Nosella	October 24, 1997
Thunder Karlsson and Bloom's sentence in prison is up, and they hear about Pippi's gold coins which they are determined to take for themselves. However, Pippi proves to be too much for them to handle. Note: Tommy and Annika do not appear.
3	3	"Pippi Doesn't Sell Her House"	Ken Sobol	Lyndon Ruddy & Steve Remen	October 31, 1997
An arrogant man wants to purchase Villa Villekulla, but he does not realize it's already owned by Pippi. Meanwhile, Thunder-Karlsson and Bloom disguise themselves as real estate agents and cheats the man out of his money for Pippi's house. Pippi has some fun misleading the rude man. In the end, the man gets fined and Thunder-Karlsson and Bloom get arrested. The arrogant man leaves the village and never returns.
4	4	"Pippi Goes Up in a Balloon"	Ken Sobol	John Martin	November 7, 1997
Tommy and Annika's mother, Ingrid, makes her children feel unappreciated, so they run away with Pippi in a hot air balloon that she found in her attic. They fly to the next town and inadvertently manage to assist in the capture of two crooks.
5	5	"Pippi Goes to the South Seas"	Ken Sobol	Antonio Zurera	November 14, 1997
Pippi is reunited with Captain Longstocking and they sail with Tommy and Annika. Little do they know Thunder Karlsson and Bloom are hiding among them.
6	6	"Pippi Meets Some Pearl Poachers"	Ken Sobol	Antonio Zurera	November 21, 1997
When the Hoppetossa docks on Kurrekurredutt Island, Pippi, Tommy and Annika are left in charge of the island's pearls. When a pair of pearl poachers arrive on the island, the kids must use their wits and strength to outsmart the poachers. The kids travel the island, foraging over the waterways and jungle to protect the pearls and their own safety.
7	7	"Pippi Goes Home"	Ken Sobol	Antonio Zurera	November 28, 1997
Following their stay on the Kurrekurredutt Island, it is time for Pippi, Tommy and Annika to go home. Along the way, they rescue Thunder Karlson and Bloom from a deserted island. En route, they encounter many difficulties at sea, including a windless channel and a tidal wave, until finally, they are washed up on an unknown land. After settling this new continent, they discover that perhaps it's not so new after all.
8	8	"Pippi Enters the Big Race"	Ken Sobol	Dan Nosella & John Flagg	December 5, 1997
It is winter in the village and all the town is involved in winter sports. Each year, there is a ski race between neighboring villages. Bengt the Bully challenges Pippi and Pippi's skiing skills are put to the test.
9	9	"Pippi Enters a Horse Show"	Robert Stutt	Simon Ward-Horner	December 12, 1997
The local horse show attracts the very finest horses, and Pippi decides to enter Horse. Horse initially does not do well, but when Mrs. Prysselius loses control of her carriage, Horse comes to the rescue and saves Mrs. Prysselius. As a result, Horse is awarded first place for his heroism, much to Mrs. Prysselius's frustration.
10	10	"Pippi Meets a Master Criminal"	Robert Stutt	Dave Thomas & Dave Pemberton	December 19, 1997
Thunder Karlsson and Bloom consult a criminal manual in hopes of accomplishing the perfect crime of getting Pippi's gold. The manual offers a lot of creative ways to carry out a crime. However, Pippi's eccentric habits prove to be too unpredictable, even for the manual. Trivia: Some stations air it as "Pippi's Mystery." Note: Tommy and Annika do not appear.
11	11	"Pippi is Shipwrecked"	John Sobol	Antonio Zurera	December 26, 1997
Tommy and Annika are intrigued and their curiosity piqued by Pippi's tales of personal encounters with shipwrecks. They consider Pippi very lucky and their own lives quite boring. She tells them not to despair. If it's a shipwreck they want, then they'll just go find one right that very day. Pippi pulls a rowboat out of the sea, proceeds to repair it and they set off to encounter a shipwreck.
12	12	"Pippi Saves the Old Folks Home"	John Sobol	Dan Nosella & Dave Pemberton	January 2, 1998
When the old folks' home is being torn down and replaced by a newer, colder less human structure, Pippi comes to the rescue of the town's senior citizens. Not only does she prove that you can fight city hall, but she also manages to save the lives of the chairman's children in the process as the new building comes tumbling down, convincing the chairman to reconsider demolishing the old folks' home. Note: Tommy and Annika do not appear.
13	13	"Pippi Goes to the Fair"	Ken Sobol	Antonio Zurera	January 9, 1998
Tommy and Annika introduce Pippi to a local custom, the annual town fair. It is all a bit confusing to Pippi and she has her own unique interpretation for everything she encounters, including the fire breather, snake charmer, card reader, bumper cars and Ferris wheel. When Adolf, the strongest man in the world, challenges to take on anyone, he is not aware that Pippi is in the audience and he soon regrets the challenge.

=== Season 2 (1998) ===
No. overall	No. in season	Title	Written by	Storyboard by	Original U.S. air date
14	1	"Pippi's Christmas"	Ken Sobol	Steve Remen	August 15, 1998
Pippi's first Christmas on land proves to be a special one. Thunder-Karlsson and Bloom have nowhere to go for Christmas and even their attempts to get arrested are bungled. Pippi comes to their aid and helps them to understand the true meaning of Christmas.
15	2	"Pippi Doesn't Want to Grow Up"	John Sobol	Antonio Zurera	August 21, 1998
Pippi suddenly realizes that she is eventually going to grow up. This is not a prospect she likes and as she thinks about her future, her fears are realized as we flash forward to a bleak future as a grown-up.
16	3	"Pippi Doesn't Go to School"	Ken Sobol	Frank Ramirez & Stephanie Gignac	August 22, 1998
Pippi discovers that she's missing out on certain holidays because she doesn't go to school, so there's nothing to take a holiday from. She joins Annika and Tommy and attends the local school, much to the amusement of the other students and the dismay of the teacher. Before she leaves, Pippi teaches Bengt the bully and his lackeys a lesson.
17	4	"Pippi Goes Up North"	Ken Sobol	Royce Ramos	August 28, 1998
Pippi and her friends join Captain Longstocking on a journey to a remote Northern Community to deliver supplies. It is a trip full of adventure as they team up with the natives to battle storms, icebergs and "poachers."
18	5	"Pippi Saves the Whales – Again"	Ken Sobol	Florentino J. Gopez	August 29, 1998
The field trip up North continues and Pippi and her "crew" must outsmart Poachers to save the rare green whales from extinction.
19	6	"Pippi Goes to School – Or Does She?"	Ken Sobol	Antonio Zurera	September 4, 1998
Pippi's friends are entering their report on the field trip up north in a competition for one of the special school prizes. Pippi decides this is worth returning to school for and is there to disrupt the special occasion, much to the disturbance of Mrs. Prysselius and the very "proper" guest of honor, Mr. Rosenbloom.
20	7	"Pippi Trains Some Animals and Their Owner"	Robert Stutt & Catharina Stackelberg	Steve Remen & Dan Nosella	September 5, 1998
An encounter with a local farmer who treats his horse very badly convinces Pippi that she has to give his animals a vacation at Villa Villekulla. Horse and Mr. Nilsson are not too enthused with the new boarders, but the animal owner learns his lesson.
21	8	"Pippi Meets the White Lady"	John Sobol	Dan Nosella & Chad Hicks	September 11, 1998
A mysterious woman arrives in the village just as a ghost is sighted at the old castle. Pippi teams up with Kling and Klang to solve the mystery of the ghost... or is it the White Lady? Note: Tommy and Annika do not appear.
22	9	"Pippi Finds a Mysterious Footprint"	John Sobol	Paul Shibli & Steve Remen	September 12, 1998
The whole town is in an uproar at the discovery of a giant footprint in the snow, presumed to be that of a mythological creature. At the prospect of the town's and townsfolk notoriety, several people are caught in the drama and crazy antics of being the first to sight and capture the creature, thereby bringing fame and fortune to themselves. All the while, Mr. Nilsson gets around undetected wearing giant snowshoes on his feet. Note: Tommy and Annika do not appear.
23	10	"Pippi Enters a Flower Show"	Ken Sobol	Antonio Zurera	September 18, 1998
Pippi sends a request to her father, Captain Longstocking, on a remote island in the South Pacific, for some unusual flower seeds so she may enter the town's annual flower show. The Captain's letter, explaining that the seeds are for cannibal flowers, is somehow lost as Pippi manages to grow the most exotic species of flowers ever seen. Not equating the loss of many small items to the flower, Pippi enters the show and chaos prevails as the cannibal flowers eat the other plant entries. Mrs. Prysellious silly accusation that the plants ate her flowers is dismissed until she is proven correct. In the end, Pippi wins the flower show and the cannibal flowers are named: Omnivora Pippidensus or "Hungry Pippis."
24	11	"Pippi Visits Aunt Matilda"	Ken Sobol	Dave Pemberton & Alex Hawley	September 19, 1998
Bloom gets wind that he is being considered as Aunt Matilda's heir to her fortune upon her death. Thunder-Karlsson and Bloom are determined to ingratiate themselves to the crotchety old aunt and Pippi has the task of finding charitable activities for the reformed crooks. Note: Tommy and Annika do not appear.
25	12	"Pippi and the Carpenter"	John Sobol	Florentino J. Gopez	September 25, 1998
Pippi befriends an inept, but good-natured carpenter and manages to help him find work in the village. When his poor workmanship puts the town at risk, Pippi must step in to do some hasty renovations.
26	13	"Pippi Takes a Train Ride"	Ken Sobol	Steve Remen & Dan Nosella	September 26, 1998
Kling and Klang have been assigned to escort two criminals (the ones from the balloon ride) on a train to a maximum security prison. Also aboard for the ride are Tommy and Annika under Mrs. Prysselius's supervision and to the delight of Thunder-Karlsson and Bloom, a shipment of money is loaded along with a guard, prompting Thunder-Karlsson and Bloom to get on board as well. Pippi, Horse and Mr. Nilsson decide to join the party and the antics follow as Thunder-Karlsson and Bloom assume the criminals have a plan to get the money and want a part of it. Note: The two criminals from the fourth episode make a reappearance.

== Release ==
=== Broadcast ===
The show aired on Teletoon in Canada starting October 17, 1997, the day the channel launched. It was also shown on HBO and HBO Family in the United States, Nickelodeon Latin America and Brazil, Nickelodeon, Channel 4, Pop and Pop Girl in the United Kingdom, Australian Broadcasting Corporation in Australia, Rete 4 and Boing in Italy, Cartoon Network in Asia, Arutz HaYeladim in Israel, Cartoon Network and TV Tokyo in Japan, and ZDF and Disney Channel in Germany and K-T.V. and Alter Channel in Greece. It later ran on YTV in Canada, Qubo in the United States, TF1 and France 5 in France, Boomerang in Australia and Disney Junior and KiKa in Germany.

=== DVD ===
24 of the 26 episodes were released on bilingual DVD by Kaboom! Entertainment in Canada. Only episode 19, "Pippi Goes to School – Or Does She?", and episode 25, "Pippi and the Carpenter", were never released on DVD in English. In total 6 volumes were released, with the first 3 being under the Teletoon Presents label with associated branding and trailers.

- Here Comes Pippi: Pippi Returns to Villa Villekulla, Pippi Doesn't Sell Her House, Pippi Meets a Master Criminal, Pippi Saves the Old Folks Home
- Captain Longstocking: Pippi Goes to the South Seas, Pippi Meets Some Pearl Poachers, Pippi Goes Home, Pippi is Shipwrecked
- Pippi goes to The Fair: Pippi goes to The Fair, Pippi enters a Horse Show, Pippi enters a Flower Show, Pippi takes a Train Ride
- Pippi and the Balloon: Pippi Goes Up in a Balloon, Pippi Entertains Two Burglars, Pippi Saves the Whales – Again, Pippi Trains Some Animals & Their Owner
- Pippi's Christmas: Pippi's Christmas, Pippi enters The Big Race, Pippi goes Up North, Pippi finds a Mysterious Footprint
- Pippi Goes to School: Pippi Doesn't Go to School, Pippi Meets the White Lady, Pippi Visits Aunt Matilda, Pippi Doesn't Want to Grow Up

== Reception ==
Ray Richmond of Variety gave the series a mixed review, calling it "spectacularly ordinary and bordering on lame" yet noting its faithfulness to the books as well as its "solid but average" animation. Lynne Heffley of the Los Angeles Times had a similar opinion, stating that "Pippi's exuberant, unsinkable spirit just barely survives the pedestrian animation, slow pacing and stereotypically drawn characters with which she's been saddled here".
