= Todd Livingston =

American film director

- Occupations: Filmmaker, Author
- Known for: Co-founding the comedy group 'Open Season,' Writing and Directing 'So, You've Downloaded a Demon,' Writing 'Rocky & Bullwinkle' comics
- Notable work: 'The Black Forest,' 'The Wicked West,' 'Starring Sonya Devereaux,' 'Rocky & Bullwinkle Adventures'
- Awards: Rondo Hatton Classic Horror Award for Best Horror Comic (2004, 2005)

Todd Livingston is a filmmaker and author.

== Career ==
Livingston began his career as a comedian in the quintette (later trio) 'Open Season'. The group toured the U.S. and Canada, headlining clubs and colleges and becoming regulars at L.A's Comedy Store, New York's Comic Strip and Improv. Livingston co-wrote and produced the group's novelty song "The Shakespeare Rap," which became a top 10 hit on the Dr. Demento radio show, and became the group's signature bit.

During the non-touring time, Livingston took gigs acting for network TV and movies, including Unsolved Mysteries and Umberto Lenzi's Hitcher in the Dark.

Livingston co-wrote with Nick Capetanakis, produced along with Capetanakis and Ken Meyer, and directed the supernatural comedy film So, You've Downloaded a Demon at Accidental Films. It was the trio's first feature film. The small indie movie premiered at the Cannes Film Festival in 2004. Meyer won the Oscar for Best Picture in 2024 as Executive Producer of "Anora".

Livingston's first graphic novels were published by Image Comics. He also worked on America jr., The Black Forest and The Wicked West, as well as The Living and The Dead, Chopper Zombie and the mini-series The Odd Squad.

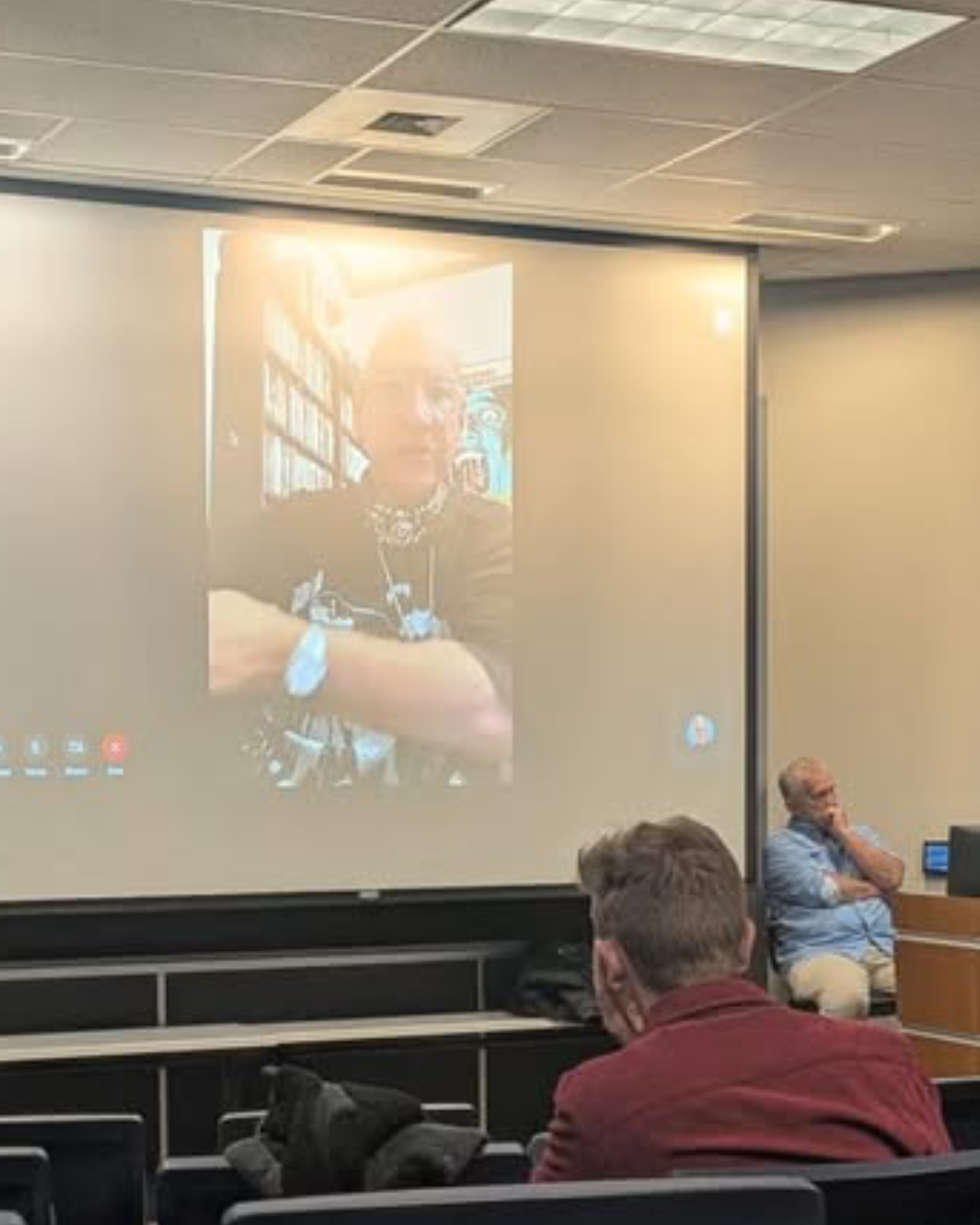
Robert Tinnell lecturing at West Virginia University while on call with Todd Livingston (2025)

Starting in 2004, Livingston cowrote multiple projects with Robert Tinnell including The Black Forest and The Black Forest 2.

In 2007, Livingston was the model for Professor X for the Marvel comic book X-MEN Origins: Jean Grey painted photo-realistically by artist Mike Mayhew. Actress Ashley Benson was the model for Jean Grey as a teen. From 2006 to 2010, he served on the advisory Board and nominating committee for the Spike TV Scream Awards.

Since 2017, Livingston has been writing Rocky & Bullwinkle comics published by American Mythology Productions.

== Awards ==
The Black Forest won the Rondo Hatton Classic Horror Awards for Best Horror Comic of 2004, and in 2005 The Black Forest 2 won the award again.

== Publications ==
- The Black Forest (27 April 2004, co-authored with Robert Tinnell)
- The Wicked West Volume 1 (2 November 2004, co-authored with Robert Tinnell)
- The Black Forest Book 2: The Castle of Shadows (4 October 2005, co-authored with Robert Tinnell)
- The Living and the Dead (30 November 2005, co-authored with Robert Tinnell)
- The Wicked West Volume 2: Abomination & Other Tales (31 October 2006, co-authored with Robert Tinnell)
- The ODD Squad (2008)
- Sheena, Queen of the Jungle: Dark Rising (2007, co-authored with Steven de Souza)
- America Jr. Volume 1 (7 August 2007, co-authored with Nick Capetanakis)
- Chopper Zombie (12 August 2008)
- Starring Sonya Devereaux (10 August 2016 – present)
- Rocky & Bullwinkle Adventures (2017)
- Rocky & Bullwinkle: As Seen on TV (26 June 2019 – present)
