= Melissa Altro =

Canadian voice actress

- Born: Melissa Amy Altro; May 16, 1982 (age 44); Montreal, Quebec, Canada
- Other name: Missy Altro
- Occupations: Voice actress; voiceover coach
- Years active: 1994–present
- Spouse: Aaron Stern
- Children: 2
- Website: melissaaltro.com

Melissa Amy Altro (born May 16, 1982) is a Canadian voice actress and voiceover coach from Montreal, Quebec.

== Early life ==
Altro was born in Montreal, Quebec, the youngest of three children to Irene (née Stern), who died in 2019 and David Altro. She was raised Jewish.

She is an alumna of St. George's School of Montreal and McGill University, where she majored in English, Drama, and Theatre, both located in her hometown.

== Career ==
Prior to having a career to voice acting, Altro guest-starred on a 1994 episode of the YTV/Nickelodeon horror anthology series Are You Afraid of the Dark?. She also starred as Heather in the 1995 film Kids of the Round Table and as Barb in The Woods. Altro is perhaps best known as the voice actor of Muffy Crosswire in the hit television series Arthur, a role she began when she was 12 years old and has continued into adulthood — the only child voice actress on the show to do so. She has also voiced her Arthur character in the series Postcards from Buster, and the specials Arthur's Perfect Christmas and Arthur's Halloween. She also has voiced other characters in Arthur, Altro also provides the voice for Gretchen in the Teletoon/Disney XD animated series Camp Lakebottom. She has also provides the voice for Pippi Longstocking in the 1997 film and the series of the same name.

In 2019, Altro became the announcer of Subway across Canada.

== Personal life ==
Altro is married to Aaron Stern where they have two sons; Oliver and Joah.

== Filmography ==
=== Film ===
| Year | Title | Role | Notes |
|---|---|---|---|
| 1995 | Kids of the Round Table | Heather | |
| 1997 | Pippi Longstocking | Pippi Longstocking | Voice |
| 2006 | The Woods | Barb | As Missy Altro |
| 2012 | I Declare War | —N/a | Talent coordinator |
| 2016 | Acting Up | —N/a | Short film; special thanks |

=== Television ===
| Year | Title | Role | Notes |
|---|---|---|---|
| 1994 | Are You Afraid of the Dark? | Alex | Episode: "The Tale of the Room for Rent" |
| 1996–2022 | Arthur | Muffy Crosswire | Supporting role |
| 1997–1998 | Pippi Longstocking | Pippi Longstocking | |
| 1999–2003 | Mona the Vampire | Additional voices | |
| 2000 | Arthur's Perfect Christmas | Muffy Crosswire | Television film |
| 2002 | Arthur: It's Only Rock 'n' Roll | Muffy Crosswire | Television film |
| 2004-2012 | Postcards From Buster | Muffy Crosswire | |
| 2006–2007 | Z-Squad | Grindel | |
| 2006–2007 | Grossology | Paige Logan | Voice; 11 episodes |
| 2007 | Being Erica | Stephanie | Episode: "The Unkindest Cut" |
| 2008 | Teddy Bear | Shelley | Television film |
| 2008–2009 | Dex Hamilton: Alien Entomologist | Sally Keaner | Voice; 3 episodes |
| 2008–2009 | World of Quest | Way / Deceit | Voice |
| 2010–2011 | Bolts & Blip | Saedee | Voice |
| 2011 | InSecurity | Ms. Perkins | Episode: "Recycle After Reading" |
| 2013–2017 | Camp Lakebottom | Gretchen | Main role |
| 2017 | Arthur and the Haunted Tree House | Muffy Crosswire | Television role |
| 2018 | Max Voltage | Rose | |
| 2019 | Esme & Roy | Mommy Ooga | |
| 2021 | Arthur's First Day | Muffy Crosswire | Television film |
| 2023 | Zokie of Planet Ruby | Tweenkle Brite | Voice |
