= The Bad Guardian =

- Directed by: Claudia Myers
- Written by: Ashley Gable
- Produced by: Robert Tinnell; Jeffrey Tinnell
- Starring: Melissa Joan Hart; La La Anthony; Luis Bordonada
- Cinematography: Francisco Bulgarelli
- Production company: Allegheny Image Factory
- Release date: 2024
- Country: United States
- Language: English

The Bad Guardian is a 2024 drama film directed by Claudia Myers. The movie draws from real-life accounts of guardianship abuse to tell the story of Leigh, a woman fighting to free her elderly father from a corrupt court-appointed legal guardian who seizes control of his finances, medical decisions, and property.

In March 2026, the film appeared as the #4 movie on Netflix.

== Plot ==
The moment Leigh Delgado takes her family out of town, she checks in on her father Eric and he doesn't answer his phone causing her family to return. He was found by a hospital by them after someone sees him suffer a fall. Leigh is then approached by a legal guardian named Janet Timms and her brother Dave who offer to have Eric looked after good upon being assigned by the courts. The moment Eric is placed in Janet's guardianship, things go wrong as Janet seizes controls of his finances, medical decisions, and property causing Leigh to fight back against Janet, Dave, and the corrupt system that is supporting them.

== Cast ==
- Melissa Joan Hart as Leigh Delgado
- La La Anthony as Janet Timms
- Luis Bordonada as Luis Delgado
- Eric Pierpoint as Jason Davis
- Jason M. Jones as Dave Timms
- Pat Dortch as Judge Russell Bean

== Production ==
Produced by Allegheny Image Factory, the film was shot entirely in West Virginia, with scenes taking place in Fairmont, Mannington, and Shinnston.

The film's executive producer, Elizabeth Stephen, developed the project after researching real-life accounts of guardianship abuse.
