= Robert Tinnell =

American film director

- Born: Fairmont, West Virginia
- Areas: Writer, Director, Producer
- Relatives: Jeffrey Tinnell (brother)

Robert Tinnell is an American writer, film director and producer. Notable directing credits include Feast of the Seven Fishes (2019), Frankenstein and Me (1996), and Kids of the Round Table (1995). Producing credits include Back Fork (2019), The Hunted (2013) and Surf Nazis Must Die (1987).

== Career ==
=== Filmmaking ===
Tinnell's work as a director includes the films Kids of the Round Table (1995), Frankenstein and Me (1996), which was very popular with fans of classic horror, and Believe (2000). Tinnell has frequently acknowledged his passion for horror, particularly classic horror films. Hammer Film Productions aficionados seek out Frankenstein and Me because of a sequence inspired by the 1960 Terence Fisher film Brides of Dracula, which starred Peter Cushing. Tinnell's film actually recreates a windmill set that is used in the Hammer film. In the same film, Tinnell meticulously recreated a scene reminiscent of Night of the Living Dead as well as other horror classics. All of the sequences featured children in the adult roles. Burt Reynolds and Louise Fletcher starred in Frankenstein and Me, alongside a young Ryan Gosling. (Stars Elisha Cuthbert and Gosling both had early film roles for Tinnell.)

As a producer, Tinnell worked in both the music video world as well as feature films. Among his credits as producer are the MTV Award-winning Paula Abdul music video "Straight Up," directed by David Fincher, and the notorious cult film Surf Nazis Must Die (released through Troma).

=== Authorship ===
Tinnell is best known in comics for a series of horror graphic novels, including The Black Forest, The Wicked West, The Living and The Dead, and Sight Unseen. His book Feast of the Seven Fishes was nominated for an Eisner Award for Best Graphic Album – Reprint. While promoting Feast of the Seven Fishes, Tinnell was a guest on several popular radio cooking shows, including The Splendid Table with Lynne Rossetto Kasper, the Rocco Dispirito Show, and KCRW's Good Food.

=== Teaching ===
Tinnell has served as a guest professor at several institutions, including West Virginia University, West Virginia State University, and Queens College.

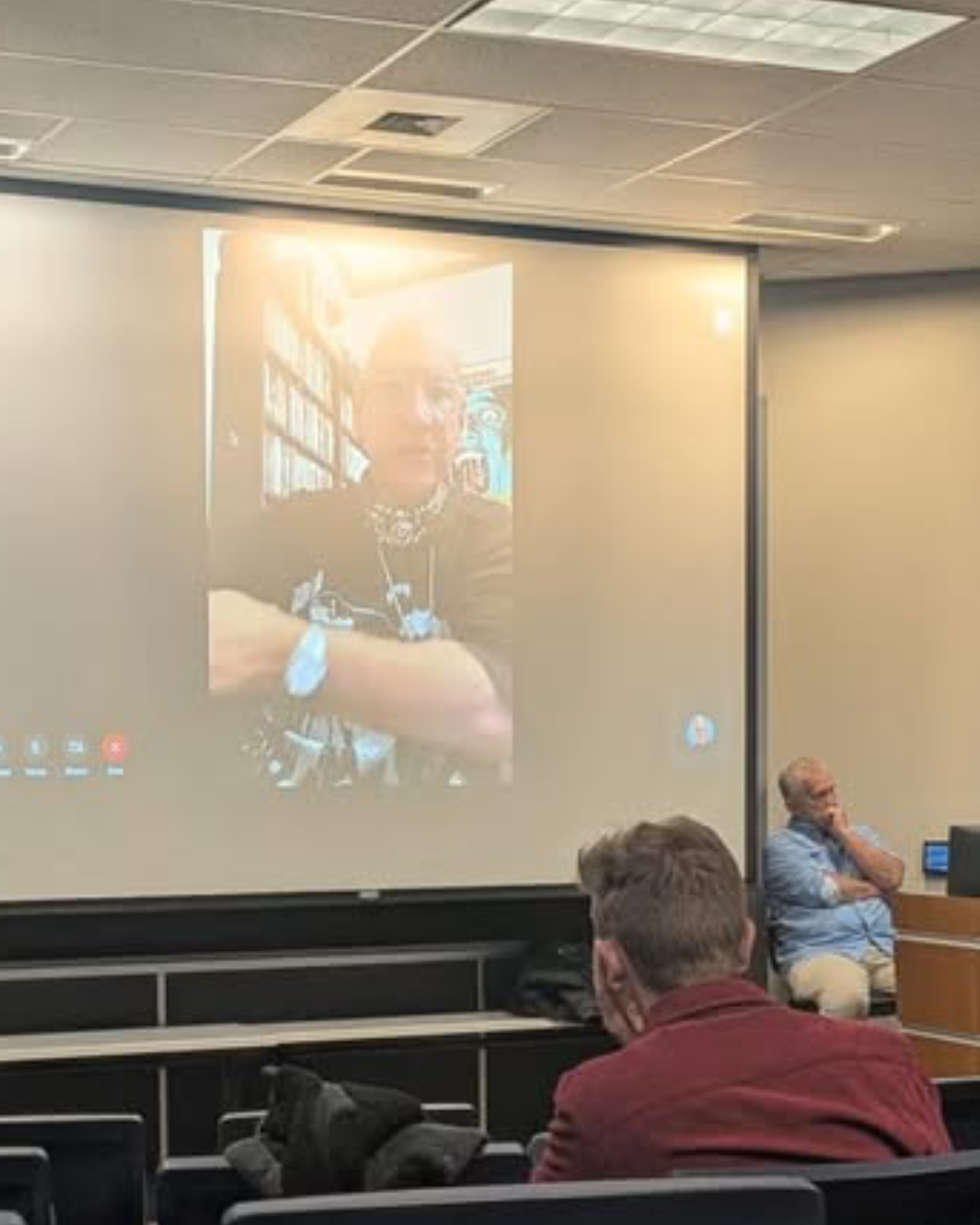
Robert Tinnell lecturing at West Virginia University while on call with Todd Livingston (2025)

== Personal life ==
Tinnell is the brother of film producer and graphic novel publisher Jeffrey Tinnell. Robert lives in West Virginia with his wife, Shannon, and two children, Isabella and Jack.

== Works ==
=== Bibliography ===
- The Black Forest (co-scripted with Todd Livingston, with art by Neil Vokes, Image Comics, 2004)
- The Wicked West (co-scripted with Todd Livingston, with art Neil Vokes, Image Comics, 2004)
- The Faceless: A Terry Sharp Story (with art by Adrian Salmon, Image Comics, 2005)
- The Living and the Dead (co-scripted with Todd Livingston, with art by Micah Farritor, Speakeasy Comics, 2005)
- Feast of the Seven Fishes (writer/art by Ed Piskor and Alex Saviuk, Allegheny Image Factory, 2005)
- Sight Unseen (co-created with artist Bo Hampton, Image Comics, 2006)
- The Wicked West 2: Abomination and other tales (numerous contributors, Image Comics, 2006)
- Kids of the Round Table (co-wrote with Aaron J. Shelton, with art by Brendon Fraim and Brian Fraim, Action Lab Comics, 2015) based on the film of the same name.

=== Filmography ===
Year	Title	Role	Notes
1987	Surf Nazis Must Die	Producer	
1993	Young Goodman Brown	Co-Producer	
1995	Kids of the Round Table	Director and Writer	
1996	Frankenstein and Me	Director and Writer	
1999	Airspeed	Director	
2000	Believe	Director and Writer	
2009	Shades of Gray	Writer and Producer	
2010	Romeo Must Hang	Writer and Producer	
2019	Back Fork	Producer	
2019	Feast of the Seven Fishes	Director and Writer	
2023	12 Desperate Hours	Producer	
2024	Gaslit By My Husband: The Morgan Metzer Story	Producer	
2024	The Bad Guardian	Producer	
2026	River	Executive producer	
