= Josh Stewart =

American actor (born 1977)

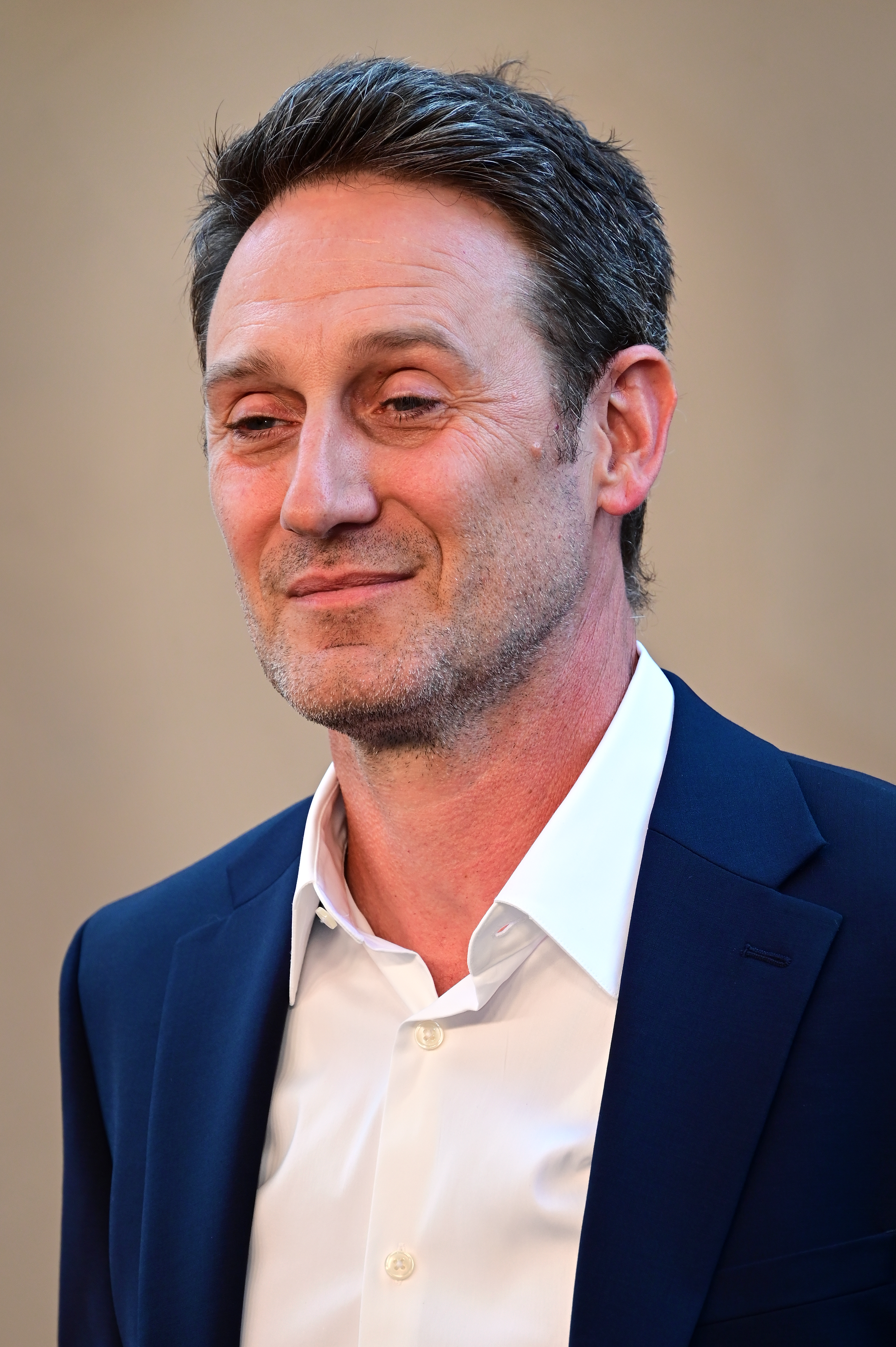
- Stewart in 2026
- Born: Joshua Regnall Stewart; February 6, 1977 (age 49); Diana, West Virginia, U.S.
- Education: West Virginia University
- Occupations: Actor; director; writer
- Years active: 1999–present
- Spouses: Deanna Brigidi (m. 2007; div. 2016) Alexa Davalos (m. 2019; sep. 2024)
- Children: 2

Joshua Regnall Stewart (born February 6, 1977) is an American actor. He had his breakout with a main role as Officer Brendan Finney on the sixth and final season of the NBC crime drama television series Third Watch (2004–2005). Following Third Watch, Stewart had a main role as Holt McLaren on the FX series Dirt (2007–2008) and a recurring role as Detective William LaMontagne Jr. on the CBS and Paramount+ police procedural series Criminal Minds (2007–present).

In the late 2000s and early 2010s, Stewart had supporting roles in the films The Haunting of Molly Hartley (2008), The Curious Case of Benjamin Button (2008), and Law Abiding Citizen (2009), along with the lead role in the horror films The Collector (2009) and The Collection (2012) and a main role as the Watcher on the ABC series No Ordinary Family (2010–2011). He made his directorial debut with the film The Hunted (2013), which he also starred in.

Later in the 2010s, Stewart had supporting roles in the films Transcendence (2014), The Finest Hours (2016), War Machine (2017), Insidious: The Last Key (2018), and The Mustang (2019). He had main roles as Solotov on season 2 of the USA Network series Shooter (2017–2018) and John Pilgrim on the Netflix series The Punisher (2019). In the 2020s, Stewart had a recurring role as Wallace on the Apple TV+ miniseries Manhunt (2024).

Stewart has frequently collaborated with director Christopher Nolan, appearing in supporting roles in his films The Dark Knight Rises (2012), Interstellar (2014), Tenet (2020), and The Odyssey (2026).

== Early life ==
Stewart was born in Diana, West Virginia, the son of Margie and Charles Regnall Stewart. His father was a high school physical education teacher as well as a former pastor of the First Baptist Church in Webster Springs and Holly River Baptist Church, and is now pastor at the Redeeming Grace Baptist Church in Webster Springs. His mother is a sixth grade teacher at Webster Springs Elementary. Stewart first attended West Virginia Wesleyan College, then transferred to West Virginia University, where he studied business. After graduating from WVU, he moved to New York City to pursue acting.

== Acting career ==
=== Early career ===
Stewart got his start doing local theater at the Landmark Theatre in Sutton, West Virginia, and eventually moved to New York City to study at the T. Schreiber studios. He was a company member of the 13th Street Repertory Theatre. He continued his theater in Los Angeles, performing in Light Bulb and Beacon alongside Robert Forster and Brooke Shields.

Stewart appeared as an extra in The WB series Dawson's Creek episode "To Green, With Love". In 2003 he filmed a pilot for a Western for ABC entitled Then Came Jones. In the pilot he played the character of Bill Jenkins.

Stewart later appeared as Sean Cleary in the CSI episode "Bad to the Bone", which aired in 2004. That same year, he also appeared in a commercial for Levi's 501 Original jeans. Stewart also had a recurring role in Criminal Minds as Detective William LaMontagne Jr, as the boyfriend, and later husband, of main character SSA Jennifer "JJ" Jareau (A. J. Cook). His first appearance was in the episode "Jones" (Season 2, Episode 18), which aired in 2007. His character was killed off in 2025 in the third season of the revived show Criminal Minds: Evolution.

=== Starring television roles ===
Stewart got his break when he was cast as Brendan Finney in the final season of the NBC series Third Watch. As Finney, he played the son of IAB captain Cathal "CT" Finney.

After Third Watch was cancelled, Stewart started filming a movie entitled Lenexa, 1 Mile (released on DVD as Full Count), alongside William Baldwin, Michael Beach, Jennifer Hall, Timothy Ryan Hensel, Chris Klein, Austin Nichols, Jason Ritter, Michael Rooker, and Paul Wesley. This was also the directing debut of Jason Wiles. After filming wrapped, Stewart began filming a new television series starring Courteney Cox Arquette entitled Dirt, for the FX Network, where he played the character of Holt McLaren. On June 8, 2008, Cox Arquette announced that Dirt had been cancelled. During the 2010–2011 season, he appeared as Joshua in ABC's No Ordinary Family.

In 2017, Stewart starred as Solotov on the second season of the USA Network thriller drama Shooter.

In 2018, Stewart joined as a series regular in the second season of Netflix's The Punisher. Stewart joined alongside cast member Alexa Davalos, who is Stewart's wife in real life.

=== Feature films ===
Stewart made his mainstream feature film debut in 2008's Curious Case of Benjamin Button playing the character of Benjamin's crewmate, Pleasant Curtis. Also that year, he appeared in The Haunting of Molly Hartley in the role of Mary Hartley's teacher, Mr. Draper. In 2009, he had his first feature film starring role, in the horror movie The Collector, playing the part of Arkin, a man attempting to rob a house to make enough money to pay off his wife's debts to loan sharks. In 2010, he starred, alongside Jamie-Lynn Sigler in the movie Beneath the Dark, (originally titled Wake) inspired by the novel The Shining. He appeared in Christopher Nolan's final film in his Batman Saga, The Dark Knight Rises as Bane's right-hand man, Barsad. He appeared as the main protagonist in the 2012 webisodes, The Walking Dead: Cold Storage, which are based on the popular television show The Walking Dead. In 2013, Josh finished filming his directorial debut, The Hunted, in which he also stars. Stewart reunited in 2014 with director Christopher Nolan as the voice of CASE in the sci-fi epic Interstellar. The same year Stewart was cast in the Disney film The Finest Hours.

=== Directorial debut ===
Stewart's directorial and writing debut was the 2013 film The Hunted. He co-produced the film along with The Collector producers Brett Forbes and Patrick Rizzotti. The found footage film revolves around Jake (Stewart) and Stevie (Ronnie Gene Blevins) who want their own TV show. In an attempt to grab the media's attention, both Jake and Stevie head to the dense, secluded woods in West Virginia, armed with only their bows and a camera, to find the biggest deer they can. However, as the sun sets over the mountains, they soon realise they are not alone in the woods and something supernatural is hunting them instead. The film screened at TIFF and eOne Films have since picked up the North American distribution rights.

== Personal life ==
In 2007, Stewart married Deanna Brigidi. They have two children. They separated in 2014 and divorced in 2016.

In 2012, Stewart went into cardiac arrest after contracting salmonella. His wife performed CPR for several minutes. Stewart now has an implantable cardioverter-defibrillator in his chest.

Stewart married actress Alexa Davalos in 2019 and separated in 2024. They starred together on the second season of the Netflix series The Punisher.

== Filmography ==
=== Movie ===
| Year | Film | Role | Notes |
|---|---|---|---|
| 2006 | Lenexa, 1 Mile | T.J. Ketting | |
| 2007 | The Death and Life of Bobby Z | Monk | |
| 2007 | Jekyll | Tommy | |
| 2008 | The Haunting of Molly Hartley | Mr. Draper | |
| 2008 | The Curious Case of Benjamin Button | Pleasant Curtis | |
| 2009 | The Collector | Arkin O'Brien | |
| 2009 | Law Abiding Citizen | Rupert Ames | |
| 2010 | Beneath the Dark | Paul | |
| 2011 | Rehab | Aaron McCreary / Carl | |
| 2012 | The Dark Knight Rises | Barsad | |
| 2012 | The Collection | Arkin O'Brien | |
| 2013 | Event 15 | Sgt. Oldsman | |
| 2013 | The Hunted | Jake | Also Director |
| 2014 | Transcendence | Paul | |
| 2014 | Interstellar | CASE | Voice |
| 2016 | The Finest Hours | Tchuda Southerland | |
| 2016 | Cold Moon | Nathan Redfield | |
| 2016 | The Neighbor | John | |
| 2017 | War Machine | Capt. Dick North | |
| 2018 | Insidious: The Last Key | Gerald Rainier | |
| 2018 | Malicious | Adam Pierce | |
| 2018 | Discarnate | Casey Blackburn | |
| 2019 | The Mustang | Dan | |
| 2019 | Back Fork | Waylon | Also Director |
| 2020 | Tenet | Male Voice | Voice |
| 2025 | Lifeline | Steven Thomas | |
| 2026 | The Odyssey | Antiphates | |
| TBA | The Collected † | Arkin O'Brien | In development |

=== Television ===
| Year | Film | Role | Notes |
|---|---|---|---|
| 2000 | Dawson's Creek | Extra | Episode: "To Green, With Love" |
| 2003 | Then Came Jones | Bill Jenkins | Pilot |
| 2003 | CSI | Sean Cleary | Episode: "Bad to the Bone |
| 2004–2005 | Third Watch | Officer Brendan Finney | Main role |
| 2007–2008 | Dirt | Holt McLaren | Main role |
| 2007–2020, 2022–2023, 2025 | Criminal Minds | Det. William LaMontagne Jr. | Recurring role |
| 2008 | Raising the Bar | Dan Denton | Episode: "Hang Time" |
| 2008 | ER | Daniel | Episode: "Under Pressure" |
| 2009 | CSI: Miami | Colin Astor | Episode: "Smoke Gets in Your CSI's" |
| 2009 | Southland | Vid Holmes | Episode: "Unknown Trouble" |
| 2009 | The Mentalist | Harlan McAdoo | Episode: "The Scarlett Letter" |
| 2010 | Ghost Whisperer | Robert Wharton | Episode: "Living Nightmare" |
| 2010–2011 | No Ordinary Family | Joshua | Recurring role |
| 2012 | Grimm | Bill | Episode: "The Bottle Imp" |
| 2012 | The Walking Dead: Cold Storage | Chase | Main role |
| 2017–2018 | Shooter | Solotov | Main role |
| 2019 | The Punisher | John Pilgrim | Main role |
| 2021 | The Rookie | Graham Porter | Episode: "Lockdown" |
| 2024 | Manhunt | Wallace | Miniseries |
| 2026 | Dutton Ranch | Sheriff Wade | Streaming Series |
