= Airspeed (disambiguation) =

Airspeed is the speed of an aircraft relative to the air.

Airspeed may also refer to:

== Specific measures of airspeed ==
- Calibrated airspeed (CAS), indicated airspeed, corrected for instrument error and position error
- Equivalent airspeed (EAS), the airspeed at sea level which represents the same dynamic pressure as that flying at the true airspeed at altitude
- Indicated airspeed (IAS), the airspeed read directly from the airspeed indicator on an aircraft
- True airspeed (TAS), the speed of an aircraft relative to the airmass in which it flies

== Other uses in aviation ==
- Air-Speed Inc, a defunct American airline
- Airspeed indicator, a flight instrument that displays airspeed
- Airspeed Ltd., a British aircraft manufacturer

== Meteorology ==
- Windspeed, the speed of the air currents

== Other uses ==
- Air speed (HVAC)
- Airspeed (film), a 1998 Canadian film
- Air Speed, a discount skateboard shoe brand sold by Wal-Mart and endorsed by skateboarder Mike McGill

== See also ==
- Speed (disambiguation)
- Air (disambiguation)
