= Jeffrey Tinnell =

American filmmaker

- Born: Fairmont, West Virginia
- Education: College of William and Mary (BA)
- Occupations: Director, screenwriter, producer
- Relatives: Robert Tinnell (brother)

Jeffrey Tinnell is an American filmmaker, best known for film producing. Alongside his brother Robert Tinnell, he runs the West Virginia film production company Allegheny Image Factory.

== Filmography ==
Year	Title	Role	Note
1993	Son of the Pink Panther	Producer	
1996	Frankenstein and Me	Producer	
1997	Les Boys	Producer	
2013	The Hunted	Producer	
2019	Back Fork	Producer	
2019	Feast of the Seven Fishes	Producer	
2023	12 Desperate Hours	Producer	
2024	Gaslit By My Husband: The Morgan Metzer Story	Producer	
2024	The Bad Guardian	Producer	
2026	River	Executive producer	
