= Karen Bernstein =

Canadian voice actress

- Occupation: Voice actress
- Years active: 1977–2005 (acting)
- Known for: Original English voice of Sailor Mercury in Sailor Moon
- Website: https://kbartists.com/

Karen Bernstein is a Canadian talent agent and retired voice actress. She is best known in North America as the original English voice of Sailor Mercury in the Canadian dubbing of the first two seasons of Sailor Moon. She was replaced by Liza Balkan.

Bernstein is also known for voicing Hello Kitty in the mid-1990s, and for portraying Tara Belle and Jett in Beverly Hills Teens in the 1980s.

Since 2017, she has run the talent agency KB Artists Management.

== Filmography ==
=== Film ===
Year	Title	Role	Notes
1977	Why Shoot the Teacher?	Violet Sinclair	
1997	Pippi Longstocking	Mrs. Settergren	
2000	Sailor Moon R the Movie: Promise of the Rose	Sailor Mercury	
2000	Sailor Moon S the Movie: Hearts in Ice	Sailor Mercury	
2000	Sailor Moon Supers the Movie: Black Dream Hole	Sailor Mercury	

=== Television ===
Year	Title	Role	Notes
1987	Beverly Hills Teens	Tara Belle, Jett	
1993–1994	Tales from the Cryptkeeper	The Weeping Woman, The Vampire, The Sleeping Beauty	
1994	Hello Kitty and Friends	Hello Kitty	
1995, 1997	Sailor Moon	Sailor Mercury	(Seasons 1–2)
1996	The Magic School Bus	Additional Voices	
1997	Pippi Longstocking	Mrs. Settergren	
1998	Birdz	Olivia Owl	
1999	Noddy	Tessie Bear	
1999	Something for Nothing	Mother	
1999–2005	Little People: Big Discoveries	Maggie	

=== Video games ===
Year	Title	Role	Notes
1995	Laura's Happy Adventures	Miriam	

Preceded by None	Voice of Sailor Mercury; Eps. 5 - 82, Movies	Succeeded by Liza Balkan
