= Diana, West Virginia =

Unincorporated community in West Virginia, United States

Diana
- Unincorporated community
- Location within the state of West Virginia Diana (the United States)
- Coordinates: 38°34′24″N 80°27′29″W
- Country: United States
- State: West Virginia
- County: Webster
- Time zone: UTC-5 (Eastern (EST))
  - Summer (DST): UTC-4 (EDT)
- ZIP code: 26217
- Area codes: 304 and 681
- GNIS feature ID: 1554299

Diana is an unincorporated community in Webster County, West Virginia, United States, along West Virginia Route 15 and the Right Fork of the Holly River.

== Notable person ==
- Josh Stewart, filmmaker, actor, and screenwriter
