= Feast of the Seven Fishes (film) =

2019 film by Robert Tinnell

- Release poster
- Directed by: Robert Tinnell
- Written by: Robert Tinnell
- Based on: Feast of the Seven Fishes by Robert Tinnell
- Produced by: John Michaels; Jeffrey Tinnell; Robert Scott Witty
- Starring: Skyler Gisondo; Madison Iseman; Josh Helman; Addison Timlin; Ray Abruzzo; Lynn Cohen; Joe Pantoliano; Paul Ben-Victor
- Cinematography: Jamie Thompson
- Edited by: Aaron J. Shelton
- Music by: Matt Mariano
- Production companies: Allegheny Image Factory; Witty Michaels Entertainment
- Distributed by: Shout! Studios
- Release date: November 15, 2019
- Running time: 99 minutes
- Country: United States
- Language: English

Feast of the Seven Fishes is a 2019 American romantic comedy film written and directed by Robert Tinnell and starring Skyler Gisondo, Madison Iseman, Josh Helman, Addison Timlin, Ray Abruzzo, Lynn Cohen, Joe Pantoliano, and Paul Ben-Victor. It marks the film debut of Jessica Darrow. It is based on Tinnell's 2005 Eisner Award-nominated graphic novel of the same name.

The film won the Audience Choice Award – Narrative Feature at the 2019 Heartland International Film Festival. It was released in select theaters and on video on demand in the United States on November 15, 2019, by Shout! Studios.

== Plot ==
Feast of the Seven Fishes is set in a rust-belt town on the banks of the Monongahela River in 1983. When Tony Oliverio, a nice, working-class, Italian-American Catholic boy brings Beth, an affluent, Ivy League, Protestant girl to his family's raucous traditional seafood feast on Christmas Eve, sparks fly.

Tony goes to a community college's business program as his family expects him eventually to run their grocery store, but his heart and talent is in art. Two days before Christmas, his best friend Angelo invites him out for a night at bars, and he reluctantly agrees. He meets Beth, whose boyfriend Prentice has broken his word to join her for Christmas in favor of a skiing holiday, and they quickly hit it off. The night is interrupted when they hear that Tony's former girlfriend, self-destructive Katie, is going to perform at a strip club. He still feels responsibility for Katie, who has not moved on from Tony, and goes to prevent her. He does, but is assaulted by the club owner in the process. Katie goes to continue her self-destructive ways at a bar, but is rescued by Juke, a friend of both her and Tony. Tony and Beth spend the night, platonically, at the shack behind his grandparents' house which he has converted into a studio. Katie offers herself to Tony's younger brother Vince, but changes her mind after seeing Tony's high school letterman jacket, which he gave her, and sends the frustrated Vince home. She ends the night curled up with the jacket, which is all she has of Tony, who she still loves.

Tony and Beth are found at the studio the next morning by Tony's great-grandmother, Nonna, who is outraged by Tony bringing home a Protestant girl obviously wealthier than them. Nevertheless, Tony's family invites her for the feast, to occur later that day. Beth's mother is very much opposed to Beth going, citing the differences between their families and their custom of spending Christmas Eve quietly at home, but Beth defies her, and goes to the home of Tony's grandparents, where the preparations for the feast are underway. Beth, Juke and other family friends join the Oliverios for the traditional feast, and all have a good time. Juke, stepping outside, sees Katie standing nearby: she regrets losing both Tony and his family, but runs away when Juke calls to her.

Beth reconciles with Tony's nonna by going to midnight Mass with her. When they get back, the first kiss between Tony and Beth is interrupted by the sudden appearance of Beth's mother and Prentice. The boyfriend is abusive in language towards Beth, and Tony punches him, but Beth, her mother and Prentice drive away, leaving Tony devastated. Juke takes some of the leftovers and goes to spend the night with Katie; neither will, as they feared, have to spend Christmas alone. Beth's mother, at their house, urges Beth to reconcile with Prentice, who is regretful for the temper he showed.

Christmas morning, Katie shows up at the grandparents' home, where Tony has spent the night, and returns the jacket, saying she has growing to do, but so does he. Tony, though, has shifted the course of his life by talking to his grandfather about going to art school, where his true talent lies. Katie leaves and Beth appears, in defiance of her mother. The two complete their first kiss.

== Cast ==
- Skyler Gisondo as Tony Oliverio
- Madison Iseman as Beth Claremont
- Addison Timlin as Katie
- Josh Helman as Juke Jakowski
- Joe Pantoliano as Uncle Frankie
- Paul Ben-Victor as Johnny
- Ray Abruzzo as Uncle Carmine
- Andrew Schultz as Angelo
- Lynn Cohen as Nonna
- Jessica Darrow as Sarah
- Cameron Rostami as Vince

== Production ==
The film was shot in Marion County, West Virginia, including the towns of Rivesville and Fairmont.

== See also ==
- List of Christmas films
