= 12 Desperate Hours =

- Written by: Conor Allyn, Benjamin Anderson, Ann Rule
- Story by: Ann Rule
- Directed by: Gina Gershon
- Starring: Samantha Mathis; Harrison Thomas; David Conrad
- Music by: Lucas Lechowski
- Country of origin: United States
- Original language: English

Production
- Producers: Conor Allyn; Benjamin Anderson; Robert Tinnell; Jeffrey Tinnell
- Cinematography: Jamie Thompson
- Editor: Alex Steyermark
- Production company: Lifetime Television

Original release
- Network: Lifetime
- Release: February 25, 2023

12 Desperate Hours is a television film directed by Gina Gershon and adapted from Ann Rule's Last Chance, Last Dance true crime collection. The film stars Samantha Mathis, Harrison Thomas, and David Conrad. The film premiered on the Lifetime network in the United States on February 25, 2023.

== Synopsis ==
The film follows Val whose family is held hostage by a murderer. Val offers to drive her captor wherever he wants if he spares her husband Mark and their children.

== Cast ==
- Samantha Mathis as Val Jane
- Harrison Thomas as Denny Tuohmy
- David Conrad as Mark Jane
- Tali Rabinowitz as Cherie
- Tina Alexis Allen as Francine
- Ben Cain as Sergeant David Corbin
- Jesse C. Boyd as Jessie
- Hannah Dunne as Carolee
