= Normand Corbeil =

Canadian composer (1956–2013)

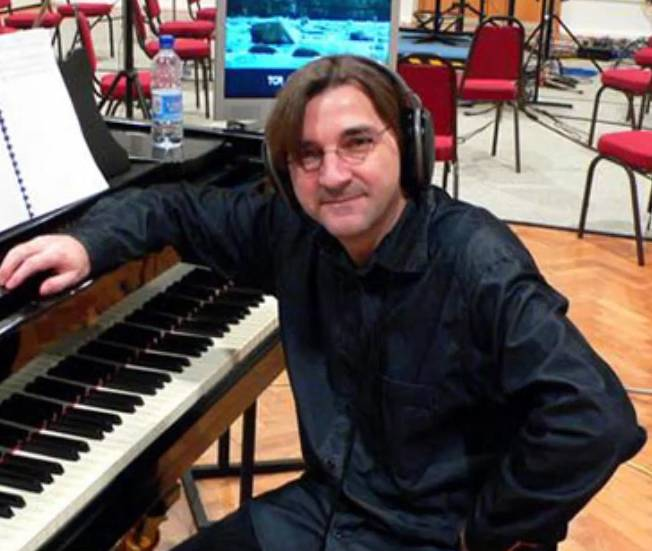
- Born: April 6, 1956; Montreal, Quebec, Canada
- Died: January 25, 2013 (aged 56); Montreal, Quebec, Canada
- Occupation: Music score composer

Normand Corbeil (April 6, 1956 — January 25, 2013) was a Canadian composer known for his work on films, video games and television.

== Biography ==
Corbeil won a BAFTA Games Award and an Interactive Achievement Award for composing the soundtrack for the 2010 PlayStation 3 video game, Heavy Rain. He also composed for the 2005 game, Fahrenheit, also known as Indigo Prophecy. The game Beyond: Two Souls is the last soundtrack that Corbeil composed, but he was unable to finish it before his death. For that reason, the game is dedicated to him.

Corbeil composed music for television and film. His credits included the films Double Jeopardy in 1999, Extreme Ops in 2002, and The Statement in 2003, as well as the short film Kara. His television work included the 2009 ABC television series, V. He received two Emmy Award nominations for his compositions.

== Death ==
Corbeil, who was diagnosed with pancreatic cancer in August 2012, died on January 25, 2013, at the age of 56.

== Scores ==
=== Film ===
- Penfield - 1991
- Kids of the Round Table - 1995
- Screamers - 1995
- Frankenstein And Me - 1996
- Never Too Late - 1996
- Les Boys - 1997
- The Kid - 1997
- The Assignment - 1997
- Airspeed - 1998
- Escape from Wildcat Canyon - 1998
- Twist of Fate - 1998
- Double Jeopardy - 1999
- The Art of War - 2000
- Pretty When You Cry - 2001
- Extreme Ops - 2002
- Talking to Heaven - 2002
- Lost Junction - 2003
- The Statement - 2003
- The Contract - 2006
- The Bait (L'Appât) - 2010

=== Television ===
- Living with the Dead (2002)
- Hitler: The Rise of Evil (2003)
- The Pentagon Papers (2003)
- Defending Our Kids : The Julie Posey Story (2003)
- Frankenstein (2004)
- Lies My Mother Told Me (2005)
- Human Trafficking (2005)
- The Last Templar (2008)
- Vertige (2012)

=== Video games ===
- Fahrenheit (2005)
- Heavy Rain (2010)
- Beyond: Two Souls (unfinished due to his death; completed by Lorne Balfe; 2013)
