= Airspeed (film) =

- U.S. DVD cover
- Directed by: Robert Tinnell
- Written by: Richard Goudreau (screenplay); Roc LaFortune (screenplay); Andrew Sands (novel)
- Produced by: Richard Goudreau
- Starring: Elisha Cuthbert
- Cinematography: Georges Archambault
- Edited by: Gaétan Huot; Louis-Philippe Rathé
- Music by: Normand Corbeil
- Distributed by: Lions Gate Entertainment
- Release date: 1998
- Running time: 81 minutes
- Country: Canada
- Language: English

Airspeed is a 1998 Canadian disaster thriller film directed by Robert Tinnell and starring Elisha Cuthbert. It was distributed by Lions Gate Entertainment & Melenny Productions.

== Plot ==
13-year-old Nicole is the daughter of the wealthy businessman Raymond Stone. She is arguing with her parents, from the parents' point of view because of her school performance, from the daughter's point of view because she feels neglected by her parents. As she is flying in her father's private plane, lightning strikes the plane and the explosion tears a hole in the cabin wall. The two pilots, Greg and Terry, are immediately injured by the electric shock and knocked unconscious. The other two adult passengers, employees of her father, are injured by a large flying first aid kit and pass out as a result of this and the negative pressure. Nicole had been playing around with the first aid kit, so it was not secured; but this meant that she also happened to have an oxygen mask over her face and the corresponding oxygen bottle with her and regains consciousness after a short time. The woman flying with her also wakes up briefly, but not for long, so Nicole is left on her own again.

The autopilot had switched on, but was defective and could not be deactivated. Initially, Nicole was in contact with the air traffic controller Jeff in the tower via the radio and, after the radio failed, via a cell phone. The first rescue attempt was made using a tanker aircraft, as tanker aircraft pilots are trained to approach other aircraft. However, this failed due to turbulence.

Then - one of Jeff's plans - the tanker plane flies under the private jet, Nicole drags the unconscious adults to the hatch by the front wheel. They manage to lower three of the four adults down. But further turbulence causes the connecting cable to break and the man who was taking them is torn from the plane, but manages to save himself with the parachute.

Nicole and the still unconscious fourth adult are still on board the plane. She has no other option than to land the plane. First, she deactivates the autopilot using her father's favorite baseball bat. Then she lands the plane under Jeff's instructions. Although her cell phone battery runs out during the approach, she manages to do it.

== Cast ==
- Elisha Cuthbert as Nicole Stone
- Joe Mantegna as Raymond Stone
- Roc Lafortune as Captain Lopez
- Bronwên Booth as Andrea Prescott
- Lynne Adams as Marylin Stone
- Russell Yuen as Mark
- Gordon Masten as Frank
- Don Jordan as Pilot Greg
- Martin Lacroix as Co-Pilot Terry
- Yvan Ponton as Lee 'Bickster' Biquette
- Charles Powell as Jeff, A.T.C.
- Larry Day as Donovan

== Reception ==
Jon Weber of Bad Movie Night was critical of the production values, comparing the film to television afterschool specials. Weber panned the film saying "This is really bad, worthy of outright heckling."
