= Criminal Minds season 5 =

Season of television series Criminal Minds

Criminal Minds
- Season 5
- Season 5 U.S. DVD cover
- Starring: Joe Mantegna; Paget Brewster; Shemar Moore; Matthew Gray Gubler; A. J. Cook; Kirsten Vangsness; Thomas Gibson
- No. of episodes: 23

Release
- Original network: CBS
- Original release: September 23, 2009 – May 26, 2010

Season chronology
- ← Previous; Season 4 Next → Season 6

The fifth season of Criminal Minds premiered on CBS on September 23, 2009 and ended May 26, 2010. Episode 18 was a pilot episode for the spin-off series Criminal Minds: Suspect Behavior.

== Cast ==
=== Main ===
- Joe Mantegna as Supervisory Special Agent David Rossi (BAU Senior Agent)
- Paget Brewster as Supervisory Special Agent Emily Prentiss (BAU Agent)
- Shemar Moore as Supervisory Special Agent Derek Morgan (BAU Agent/Acting Unit Chief)
- Matthew Gray Gubler as Supervisory Special Agent Dr. Spencer Reid (BAU Agent)
- A. J. Cook as Supervisory Special Agent Jennifer "JJ" Jareau (BAU Communications Liaison)
- Kirsten Vangsness as Special Agent Penelope Garcia (BAU Technical Analyst)
- Thomas Gibson as Supervisory Special Agent Aaron "Hotch" Hotchner (BAU Unit Chief/Agent)

=== Special guest star ===
- Forest Whitaker as Supervisory Special Agent Sam Cooper (BAU Red Cell Team Leader)
- Michael Kelly as Supervisory Special Agent Jonathan "Prophet" Simms
- Matt Ryan as Supervisory Special Agent Mick Rawson
- Beau Garrett as Supervisory Special Agent Gina LaSalle
- Tim Curry as the "Prince of Darkness"
- Charlie Ray as Megan Maxwell

=== Recurring ===
- Jayne Atkinson as Supervisory Special Agent Erin Strauss (BAU Section Chief)
- Cade Owens as Jack Hotchner
- Nicholas Brendon as Kevin Lynch
- Meredith Monroe as Haley Hotchner
- Josh Stewart as William "Will" LaMontagne Jr.
- Mekhai Andersen as Henry LaMontagne

=== Guest ===
- David Eigenberg as FBI Special Agent Russell Goldman (Episode 14)

== Guest stars ==
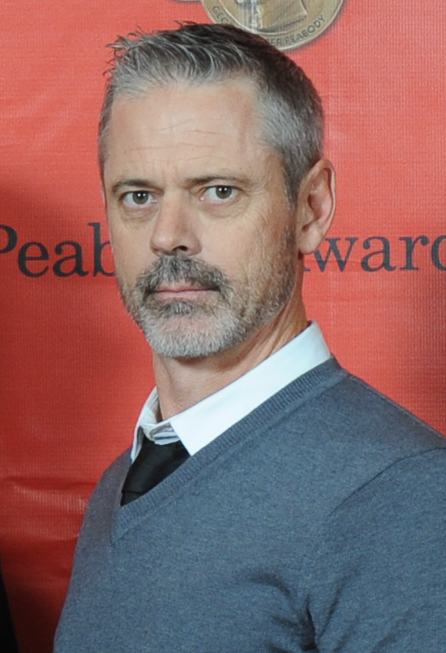
Southland star C. Thomas Howell reprises as George Foyet, a.k.a. "The Boston Reaper", in the season premiere and the series landmark 100th episode.

In the season premiere "Nameless, Faceless", D. B. Sweeney guest-starred as Sam Kassmeyer, a U.S. Marshal who is assigned to protect Aaron Hotchner's family until George Foyet is caught. Christopher Cousins guest-starred as Dr. Tom Barton, a trauma surgeon whose son is targeted by the father of a teenage boy Barton tried to save. In the episode "Haunted", Sean Patrick Flanery guest-starred as Darrin Call, a spree killer who has never forgotten the day his father's last victim escaped. Glenn Morshower guest-starred as Lieutenant Kevin Mitchell, who leads the investigation of the shooting. Michael Bowen guest-starred as Tommy Phillips, the lone survivor of Darrin's father Bill Jarvis, a.k.a. "The Hollow Creek Killer", played by Don Creech. In the episode "Reckoner", Lawrence Pressman guest-starred as Boyd Schuller, a terminally ill court judge who hires Tony Mecacci to commit a series of vigilante murders, with William Sadler playing a mob boss.

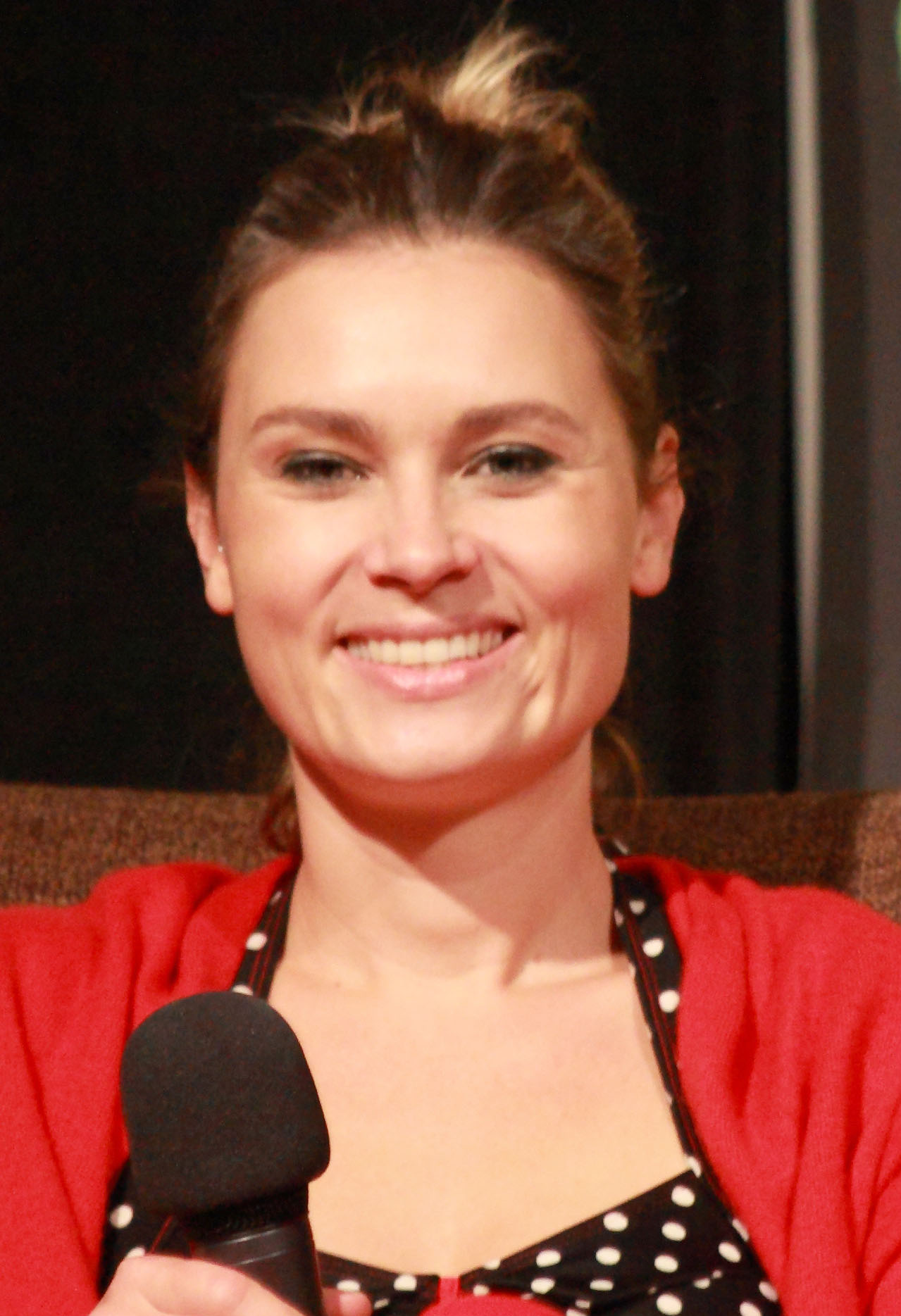
Kristina Klebe appears in the episode "Outfoxed" as Miranda Dracar.

In the episode "Hopeless", Clayne Crawford and Blake Shields guest-starred as C. Vincent and J.R. Baker, a gang of thrill killers known as "Turner's Group." Wade Williams guest-starred as Detective Andrews, who leads the investigation of the murders. In the episode "Cradle to Grave", Mae Whitman and Hallee Hirsh guest-starred as Julie and Carol, two women who are abducted by a married couple, who are unable to have children due to the wife dying from breast cancer. In the episode "The Performer", Gavin Rossdale guest-starred as Paul "Dante" Davies, a famous rock musician who is suspected of murdering several of his fans. Eddie Jemison guest-starred as Paul's manager, Ray Campion, who is responsible for the murders, as was his accomplice, Gina King, played by Inbar Lavi. In the episode "Outfoxed", Neal Jones reprises as Karl Arnold, a.k.a. "The Fox", where he is interviewed by Hotch and Prentiss, who are investigating someone who is copying Arnold's murders.

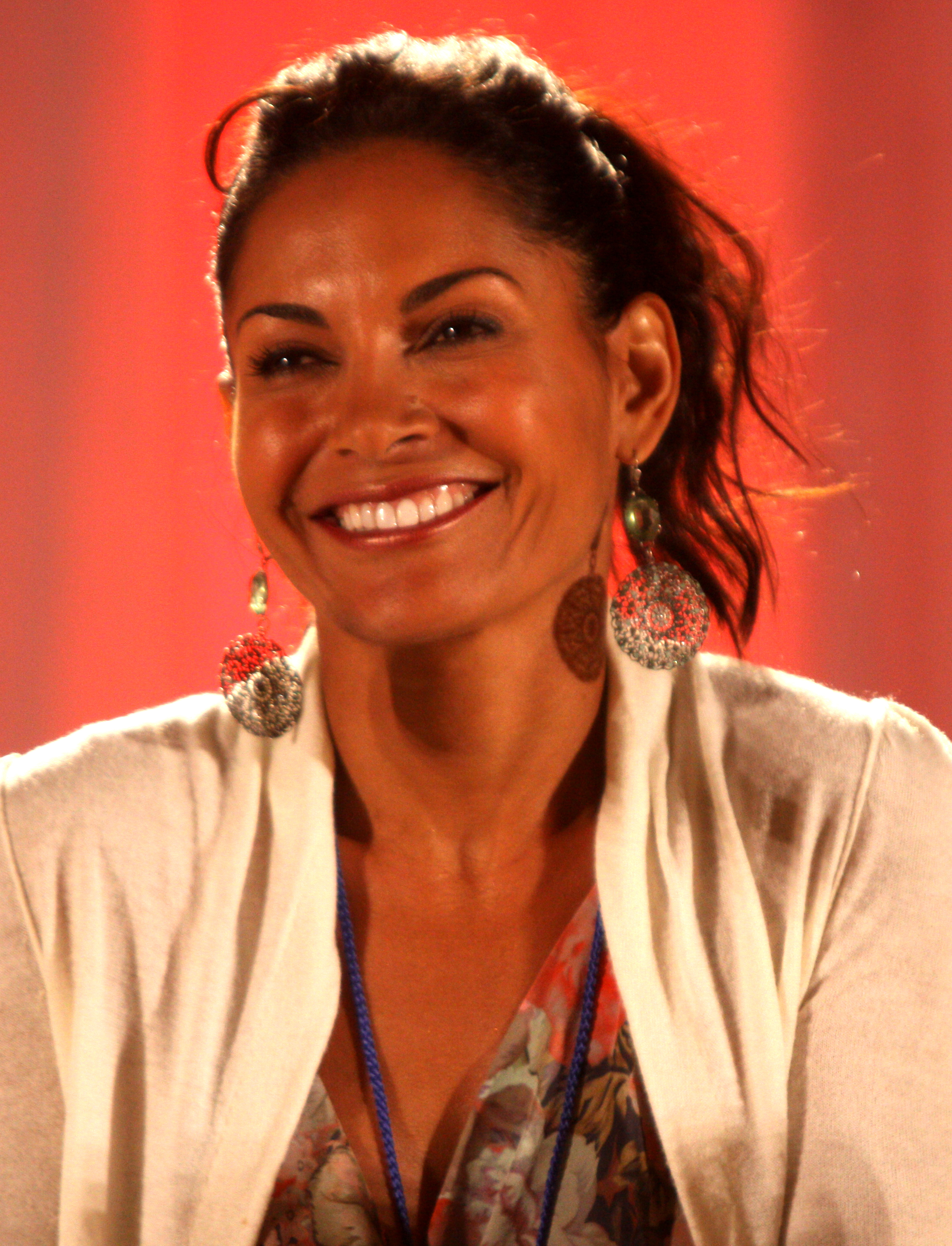
Salli Richardson appears in the episodes "Hopeless" and "The Eyes Have It" as Tamara Barnes.

In the episode "The Slave of Duty", Wes Brown guest-starred as Joe Belser, a.k.a. "The Nashville Stalker", a misogynistic serial killer and Khary Payton guest-starred as Detective Landon Kaminski, who leads the investigation of the murders. In the episode "Retaliation", Lee Tergesen guest-starred as Dale Schrader, a serial killer who escapes police custody and abducts the family of his former accomplice. In the episode "The Uncanny Valley", Jonathan Frakes guest-starred as Dr. Arthur Malcolm, a pedophile who molested his daughter, Samantha, and gave her porcelain dolls away to another girl. Rosalie Ward guest-starred as Bethany Wallace, a woman who is abducted by Samantha Malcolm. In the episode "Risky Business", John Pyper-Ferguson guest-starred as Wilson Summers, a father who created a viral internet game that convinces young teenagers to commit suicide.

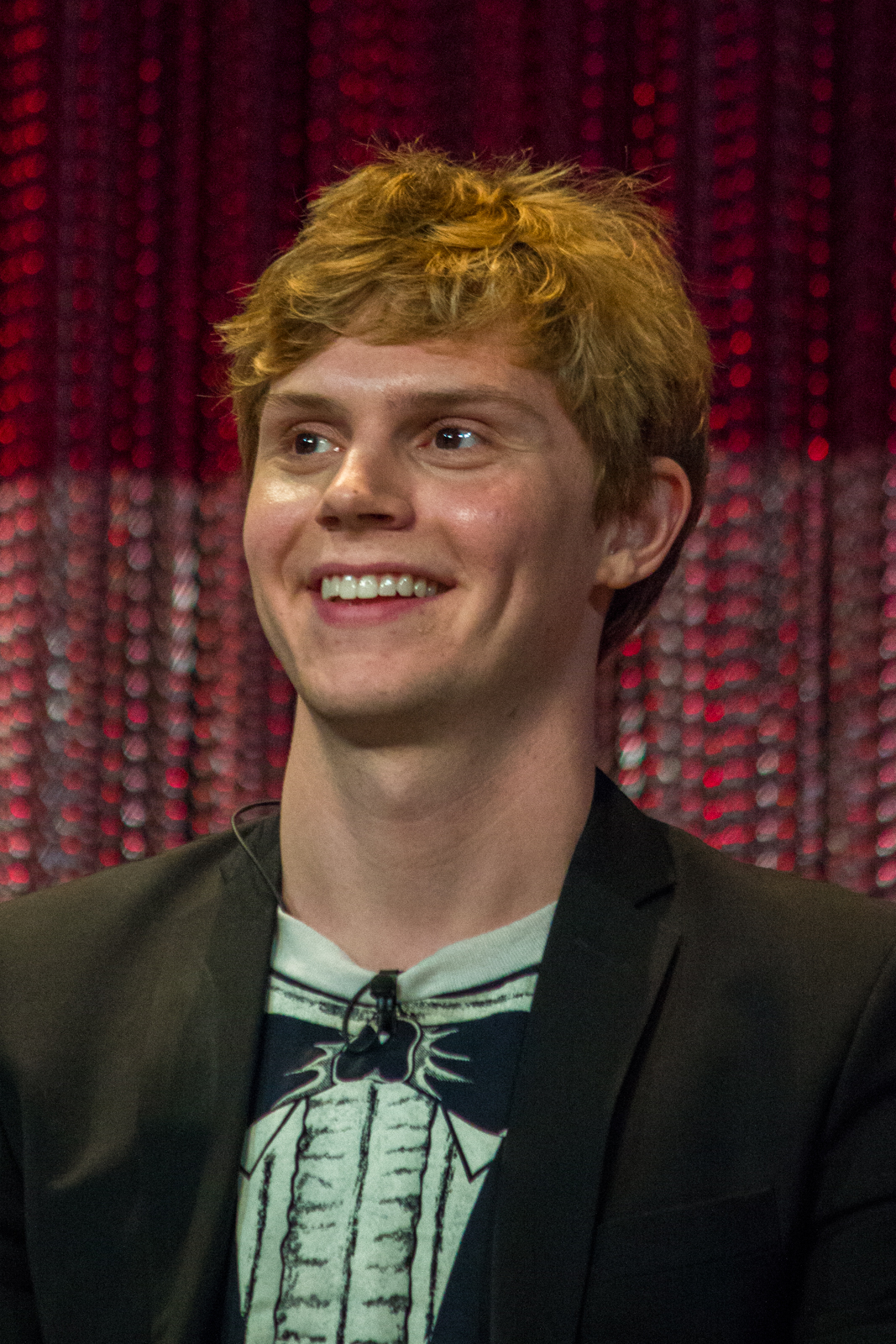
Evan Peters appears in the episode "Mosley Lane" as Charlie Hillridge.

In the episode "Parasite", Victor Webster guest-starred as Bill Hodges, a serial killer who has a wife and two other lovers. Annabeth Gish guest-starred as Bill's wife, Rebecca, and Valerie Cruz guest-starred as Bill's secret lover, Brooke Sanchez. In the episode "Public Enemy", Sprague Grayden guest-starred as Meg Collins, a religious mother and wife whose husband is murdered by Connor O'Brien, a spree killer who murders people simply to generate fear among the public. In the episode "Mosley Lane", Bud Cort and Beth Grant guest-starred as Roger and Anita Roycewood, a married couple who abduct children and cremate their remains after sedating them. Ann Cusack guest-starred as Sarah Hillridge, an alcoholic mother and wife whose son has been missing for eight years, and Brooke Smith guest-starred as Barbara Lynch, a mother and wife whose daughter, Aimee, is abducted by the Roycewoods.

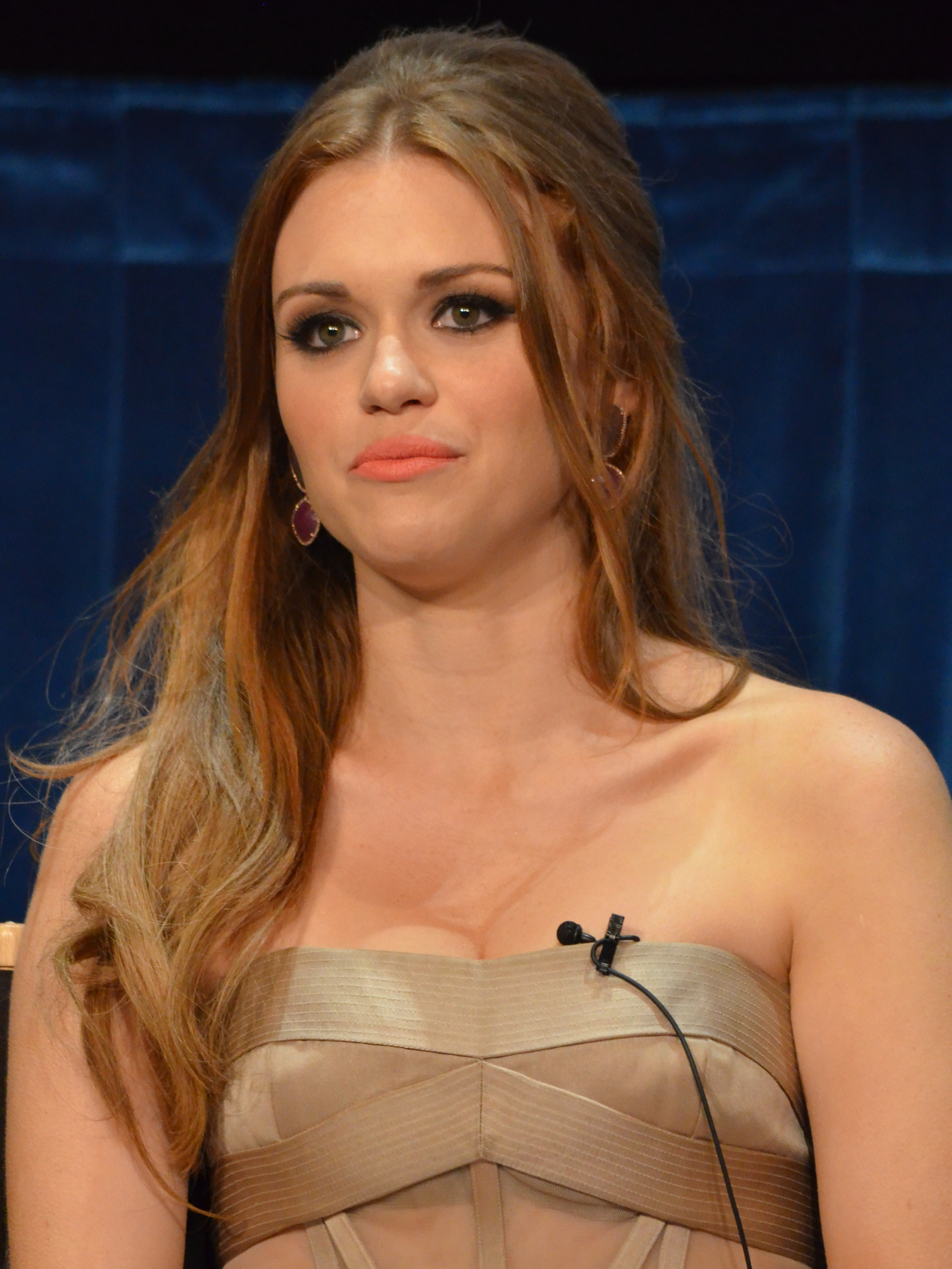
Teen Wolf star Holland Roden appears in the episode "A Thousand Words" as Rebecca Daniels.

In the episode "Solitary Man", Morgan Lily guest-starred as Jody Hatchett, a young girl whose father, Wade, abducts mothers for Jody and would later tell her about his escapades as fairytales. Gabrielle Carteris guest-starred as Nancy Campbell, the last victim whom Wade abducts. In the episode "The Fight", Alexa Nikolas guest-starred as Jane McBride, a teenage girl who is abducted by John Vincent Bell, along with her father, Ben. Lesley Fera guest-starred as Leslie McBride. In the episode "A Rite of Passage", Mike Doyle guest-starred as Deputy Ronald Boyd, a serial killer who is targeting illegal immigrants trying to cross the U.S. border. Marlene Forte guest-starred as Sheriff Eva Ruiz, who aids the BAU with the investigation of the murders until Ronald murders her. In the episode "A Thousand Words", Jolene Andersen guest-starred as Juliet Monroe, a pregnant widow who has been abducting women for several years until she dies giving birth to her son.

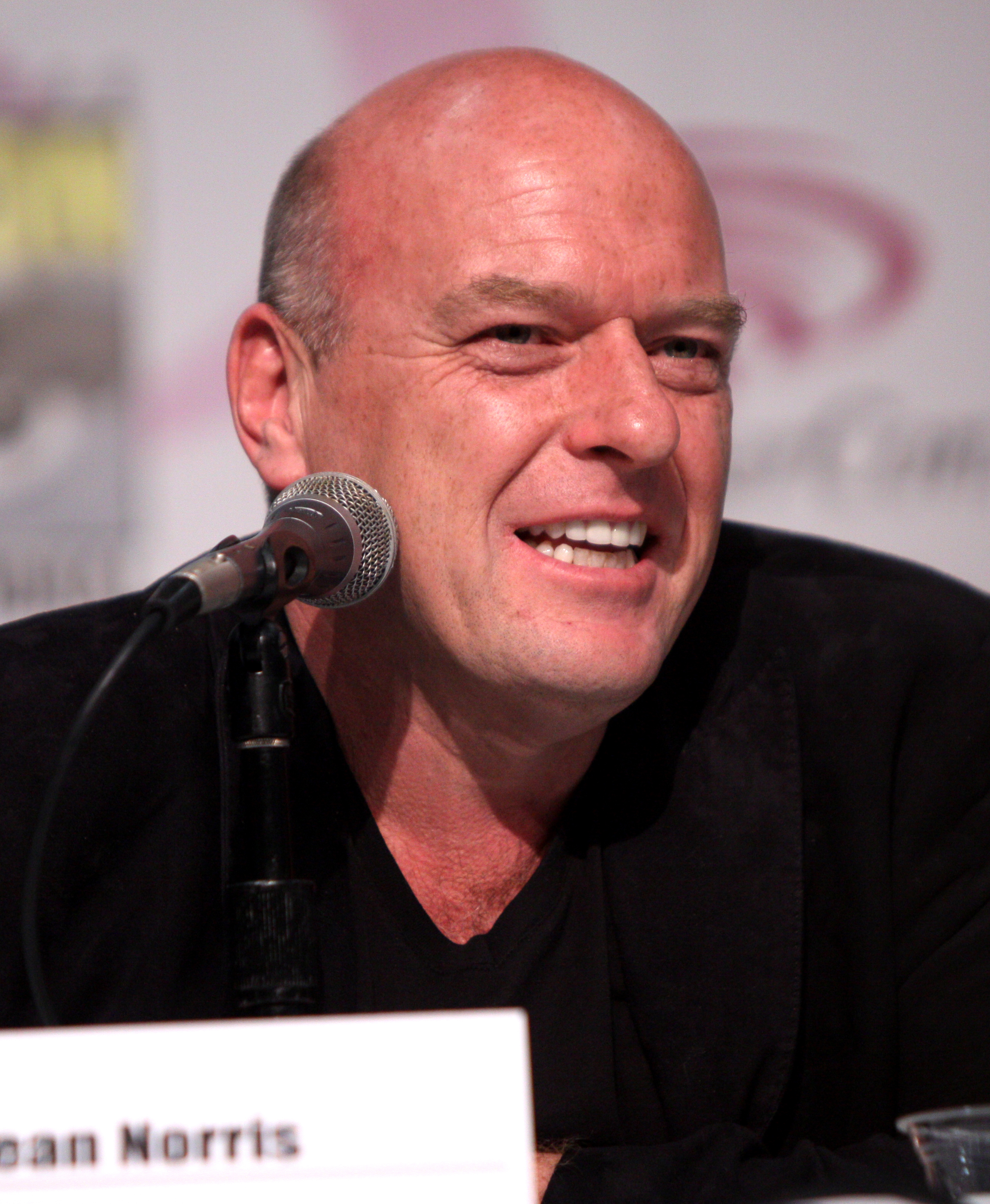
Breaking Bad star Dean Norris appears in the episode "A Thousand Words" as Det. John Barton.

In the episode "Exit Wounds", Mark L. Young guest-starred as Owen Porter, a serial killer and, at one point, a cannibal, from an abusive family. Eric Ladin guest-starred as Joshua Beardsley, a man who seeks vengeance against Porter for murdering his mother Carol, played by Dale Dickey. In the episode "The Internet is Forever", Ned Schmidtke guest-starred as Austin Chapman, the criminal accomplice of Robert Johnson, a.k.a. "The Internet Killer." In the season finale "Our Darkest Hour", Tim Curry guest-starred as one of the series most notorious criminals, Billy Flynn, a.k.a. "The Prince of Darkness", a serial killer who murders all but one victim. Eric Close guest-starred as Matt Spicer, a police detective leading the Prince of Darkness case, Robert Davi guest-starred as Spicer's partner, Detective Adam Kurzbard, and Linda Purl guest-starred as Colleen Everson, a woman who, after Billy Flynn raped her and murdered her husband, attempted suicide twice.

== Episodes ==
No. overall	No. in season	Title	Directed by	Written by	Original release date	Prod. code	U.S. viewers (millions)
92	1	"Nameless, Faceless"	Charles S. Carroll	Chris Mundy	September 23, 2009	501	15.84
With Hotch missing and the events of their previous case still weighing on them, the remaining members of the BAU set out to protect a McLean, Virginia emergency room doctor and his teenage son from a former patient determined to avenge a wrongful death. Meanwhile, a serial killer from the team's past (C. Thomas Howell) enacts a sinister master plan involving one of their own.
93	2	"Haunted"	Jon Cassar	Erica Messer	September 30, 2009	502	14.24
When a traumatized Louisville, Kentucky man suffers a psychotic breakdown and attacks six people at a pharmacy, killing three of them, the BAU juggles putting together a profile and working with local authorities to track him down. Meanwhile, Hotch continues recovering from Foyet's attack and the team notices a disturbing change in his behavior.
94	3	"Reckoner"	Karen Gaviola	Dan Dworkin & Jay Beattie	October 7, 2009	503	14.05
When three people in Commack, New York are gunned down at close range and mutilated postmortem, the BAU sets out to track down a hitman hired to commit a series of vigilante murders. Meanwhile, Rossi finds himself forced to face his past after discovering a connection between a childhood friend and one of the hitman's intended targets.
95	4	"Hopeless"	Félix Alcalá	Chris Mundy	October 14, 2009	504	13.92
When a series of escalating vandalism incidents in Washington, D.C. culminate in a quadruple homicide, the BAU initiates a manhunt for a trio who commit crimes for the thrill of violence. Meanwhile, Morgan finds himself forging a personal connection with the sister of one of the victims.
96	5	"Cradle to Grave"	Rob Spera	Breen Frazier	October 21, 2009	505	14.27
When three young New Mexico women are abducted, impregnated, and strangled to death minutes after giving birth, the BAU sets out to track down an Albuquerque serial killer with an unusual motivation. Meanwhile, Hotch starts giving Morgan additional duties after receiving a surprise visit from Section Chief Strauss.
97	6	"The Eyes Have It"	Glenn Kershaw	Oanh Ly	November 4, 2009	506	12.55
With Morgan officially replacing Hotch as Unit Chief, the BAU travels to Oklahoma City, Oklahoma to investigate the seemingly unrelated murders of a 61-year-old man and two teenage girls who all had their eyes removed postmortem.
98	7	"The Performer"	John Badham	Holly Harold	November 11, 2009	507	12.77
When three Los Angeles, California women are strangled to death and exsanguinated, the BAU juggles working with an ally from their past (Ian Anthony Dale) and considering whether or not a Goth rock star (Gavin Rossdale) is responsible for the crimes.
99	8	"Outfoxed"	John Gallagher	Simon Mirren	November 18, 2009	508	13.70
When two Hampton, Virginia military families are murdered in their homes while the fathers are overseas, the BAU determines the crimes are similar to those committed by incarcerated family annihilator Karl Arnold (Neal Jones). Meanwhile, Hotch grows increasingly unnerved after receiving an ominous message.
100	9	"100"	Edward Allen Bernero	Bo Crese (Note: 'Bo Crese' is a pseudonym used in the credits of "100". It is an acronym formed with the first letter of the name of every writer who contributed to the script: Breen Frazier, Oanh Ly, Chris Mundy, Rick Dunkle, Erica Messer, Simon Mirren and Edward Allen Bernero.)	November 25, 2009	509	13.61
Following an encounter with Foyet at Hotch's former residence, the BAU submits to individual questioning about the events leading up to and surrounding their attempt to prevent Foyet from further threatening Hotch and his family.
101	10	"The Slave of Duty"	Charles Haid	Rick Dunkle	December 9, 2009	510	14.43
With Hotch taking a leave of absence to contemplate his future with the FBI, the BAU travels to Nashville, Tennessee to apprehend a serial killer responsible for the deaths of two women, whom he stalks and romances against their will before killing them.
102	11	"Retaliation"	Félix Alcalá	Erica Messer	December 16, 2009	511	14.68
After arresting a recently paroled Lockport, New York bank robber for the murder of a woman and the kidnapping of his teenage daughter, the BAU has to search for an ulterior motive when the man escapes with the help of a previously unknown accomplice and embarks on a killing spree.
103	12	"The Uncanny Valley"	Anna J. Foerster	Breen Frazier	January 13, 2010	512	13.90
When two Atlantic City, New Jersey women are found dead from drug-induced paralysis, the BAU sets out to profile a female serial killer who abducts certain types of women for an unusual personal obsession.
104	13	"Risky Business"	Rob Spera	Jim Clemente	January 20, 2010	513	14.91
When four Uinta County, Wyoming teenagers commit suicide within a week, the BAU determines they were manipulated into participating in an online "choking game" and attempts to profile and track down its creator.
105	14	"Parasite"	Charles S. Carroll	Oanh Ly	February 3, 2010	514	14.75
When an agent from the FBI's White Collar Crime Unit suspects a con artist he has been tracking across the country for the last five years is responsible for the recent murder of a Miami, Florida woman, the BAU sets out to profile a budding spree killer who kills the people he cons to prevent them from exposing his activities.
106	15	"Public Enemy"	Nelson McCormick	Jess Prenter Prosser	February 10, 2010	515	14.33
When three Providence, Rhode Island residents are stabbed to death in locations considered to be pillars of the community, the BAU sets out to profile and track down a serial killer bent on generating mass public fear.
107	16	"Mosley Lane"	Matthew Gray Gubler	Simon Mirren & Erica Messer	March 3, 2010	516	13.00
When an eight-year-old Ashburn, Virginia girl disappears from a carnival and a single mother (Ann Cusack) claims the abduction is connected to the eight-year disappearance of her then-eight-year-old son (Evan Peters), the BAU works to track down a married couple responsible for kidnapping a total of 12 children over the course of 11 years.
108	17	"Solitary Man"	Rob Hardy	Kimberly Ann Harrison & Ryan Gibson	March 10, 2010	517	13.29
When the FBI's Highway Serial Killer Database suggests five women found strangled to death along Interstates 25 and 40 in multiple states were killed by a budding spree killer, the BAU attempts to track down a trucker based out of Edgewood, New Mexico on a personal mission.
109	18	"The Fight"	Richard Shepard	Teleplay by : Chris Mundy; Story by : Chris Mundy & Edward Allen Bernero	April 7, 2010	518	12.70
When a homeless man is found dead in San Francisco, California and a father and his teenage daughter are subsequently abducted, the BAU works with SSA Sam Cooper (Forest Whitaker) and the Red Cell Unit, a rapid response team with non-conventional methods, to track down a serial killer who forces his victims to fight each other to the death in brutal hand-to-hand matches. This episode serves as the backdoor-pilot episode for Criminal Minds: Suspect Behavior.
110	19	"A Rite of Passage"	John Gallagher	Victor De Jesus	April 14, 2010	519	12.44
When three decapitated human heads are discovered outside the Terlingua, Texas police station, the BAU sets out to profile a serial killer who targets illegal immigrants crossing the Mexico–United States border.
111	20	"…A Thousand Words"	Rosemary Rodriguez	Edward Allen Bernero	May 5, 2010	520	12.39
When a female Tallahassee, Florida college student disappears and local authorities receive a 911 call from a man confessing to murder before committing suicide and leaving evidence of several women killed over the last 10 years behind, the BAU juggles profiling the deceased man and locating his latest victim.
112	21	"Exit Wounds"	Charles S. Carroll	Rick Dunkle	May 12, 2010	521	13.07
When three residents of a small Alaska fishing town are killed within a week, the BAU attempts to identify a serial killer with an obsession for hunting. Meanwhile, Garcia accompanies the team and finds herself in a dangerous situation.
113	22	"The Internet Is Forever"	Glenn Kershaw	Breen Frazier	May 19, 2010	522	13.25
When three Boise, Idaho women disappear and the BAU uncovers grisly online videos of them getting strangled to death, the team juggles profiling a killer who uses social networking websites as his hunting ground and tracking him down before he kills his next victim.
114	23	"Our Darkest Hour"	Edward Allen Bernero	Erica Messer	May 26, 2010	523	12.97
When three Los Angeles, California residents are murdered in their homes during rolling blackouts, the BAU juggles tracking down a serial killer who uses the blackouts to commit his crimes at night and dealing with an unexpected connection that promises to change the course of the investigation.

== Home media ==
The Complete Fifth Season
Set details		Special features
23 episodes; 6-disc set; Aspect Ratio: 2.35:1; Subtitles: English; English: Dolby Digital 5.1		Fear the Reaper; Celebrating 100; Gubler Direct; Material Witness; On Air Promos; Case Files; Gag Reel
DVD release date
Region 1	Region 2	Region 4
September 7, 2010	February 28, 2011	March 2, 2011
