= Episode 100 =

Episode 100 may refer to:

- "Episode 100" (American Horror Story), an episode of American Horror Story: 1984
- "100" (Criminal Minds), an episode of Criminal Minds
- "100" (Fear the Walking Dead), an episode of Fear the Walking Dead
- "100" (Glee), an episode of Glee
- "100" (30 Rock), an episode of 30 Rock

== See also ==
- 100 episodes
- List of The 100 episodes
