= Criminal Minds season 1 =

Season of television series Criminal Minds

Criminal Minds
- Season 1
- Season 1 U.S. DVD cover
- Starring: Mandy Patinkin; Thomas Gibson; Lola Glaudini; Shemar Moore; Matthew Gray Gubler; A. J. Cook; Kirsten Vangsness
- No. of episodes: 22

Release
- Original network: CBS
- Original release: September 22, 2005 – May 10, 2006

Season chronology
- Next → Season 2

The first season of Criminal Minds premiered on CBS on September 22, 2005, and concluded on May 10, 2006. The season consisted of 22 episodes.

== Cast ==
=== Main ===
- Mandy Patinkin as Supervisory Special Agent Jason Gideon (BAU Senior Agent)
- Thomas Gibson as Supervisory Special Agent Aaron "Hotch" Hotchner (BAU Unit Chief)
- Lola Glaudini as Supervisory Special Agent Elle Greenaway (BAU Agent)
- Shemar Moore as Supervisory Special Agent Derek Morgan (BAU Agent)
- Matthew Gray Gubler as Supervisory Special Agent Dr. Spencer Reid (BAU Agent)
- A. J. Cook as Supervisory Special Agent Jennifer "JJ" Jareau (BAU Communications Liaison) Cook joined the main cast after the pilot episode. Her first appearance was in the second episode "Compulsion."

=== Also starring ===
- Kirsten Vangsness as Special Agent Penelope Garcia (BAU Technical Analyst) Vangsness is promoted to a series regular beginning with episode 14. This is the only season where a series regular is listed under also starring.

=== Recurring ===
- Meredith Monroe as Haley Hotchner
- Jane Lynch as Diana Reid

== Guest stars ==
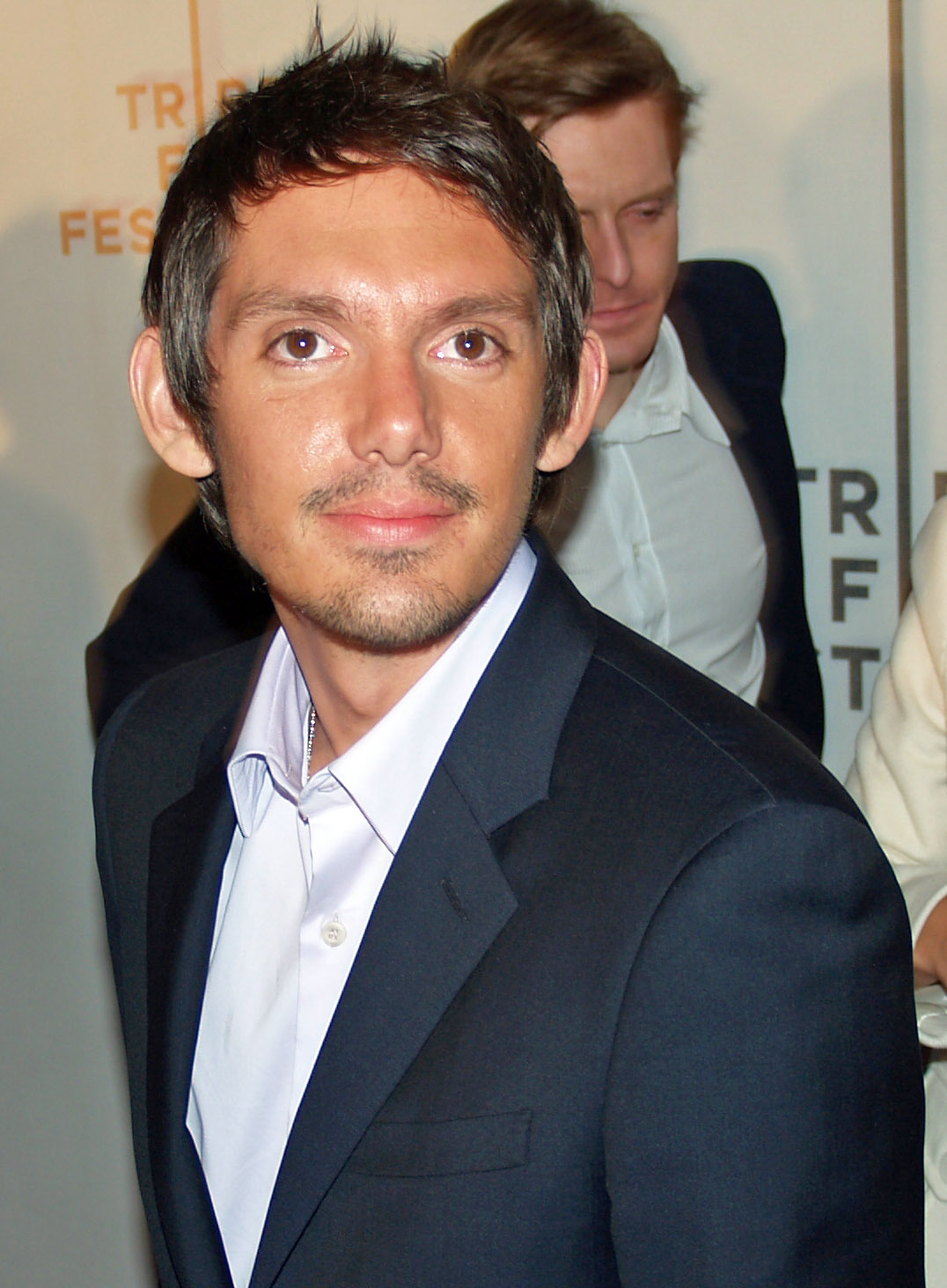
Lukas Haas appears in the first two episodes as The Footpath Killer.

In the pilot episode, "Extreme Aggressor", Andrew Jackson guest-starred as Timothy Vogel. Chelah Horsdal guest-starred as his victim, Heather Woodland. In the episode "Won't Get Fooled Again", Tim Kelleher guest-starred as Adrian Bale, a serial bomber responsible for the deaths of six FBI agents. In the episode "Plain Sight", Kirk B. R. Woller guest-starred as serial rapist Franklin Graney. In the episode "Broken Mirror", Matt Letscher guest-starred as Vincent Shyer, an erotomaniacal stalker who abducts one of the twin daughters of Executive Assistant District Attorney Evan Davenport, played by Robin Thomas. Elisabeth Harnois guest-starred in a dual role as Davenport's daughters, Patricia and Cheryl.

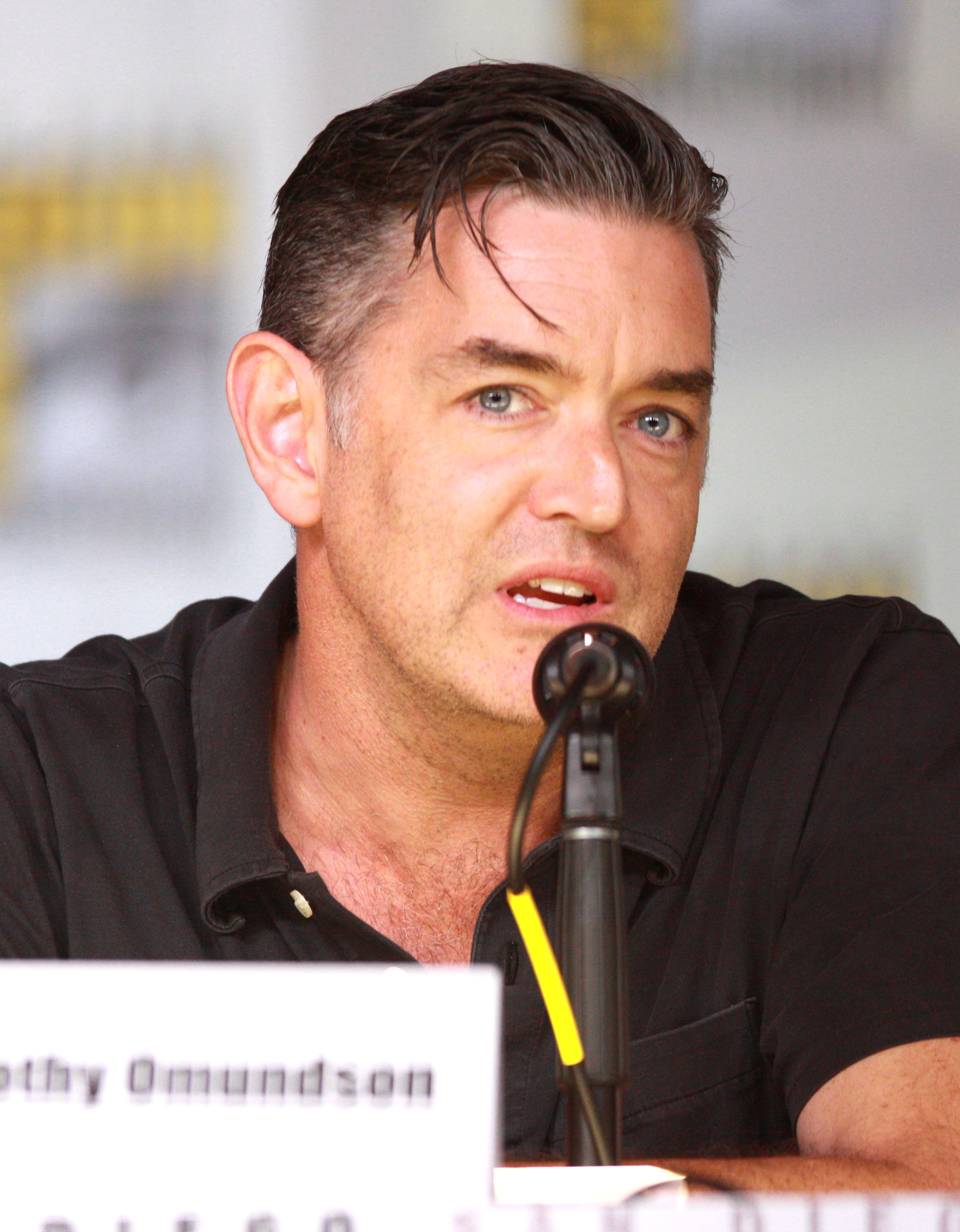
Psych star Timothy Omundson appears in the episode "L.D.S.K." as Phillip Dowd.

In the episode "L.D.S.K.", Marcus Giamatti guest-starred as Barry Landman, a narcissistic trauma surgeon suspected of committing several shootings. Paula Newsome portrays Detective Shea Calvin, who leads the investigation of the shootings. In the episode "The Fox", Neal Jones guest-starred as one of the series' most notorious criminals, Karl Arnold, aka "The Fox", a serial killer who murders entire families. Tony Todd guest-starred as Eric Miller, a man who was wrongfully imprisoned for the murder of his family. In the episode "Natural Born Killer", Patrick Kilpatrick guest-starred as Vincent Perotta, a professional hitman who abducts FBI agent Josh Cramer of the Organized Crime Unit. Francesco Quinn guest-starred as Michael Russo, a mob boss who hires Perotta to abduct Cramer.

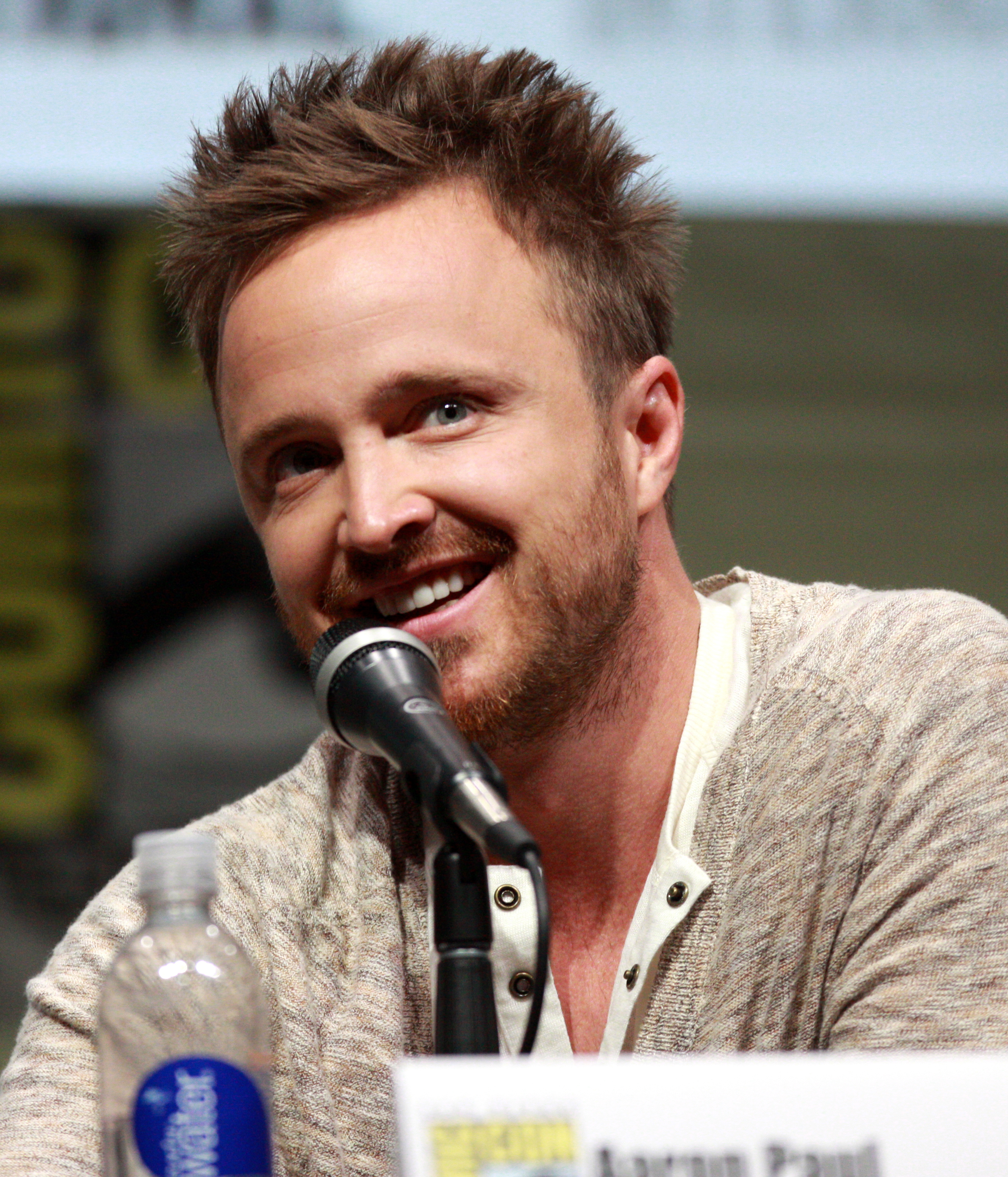
Breaking Bad star Aaron Paul appears in the episode "The Popular Kids" as Mike Zizzo.

In the episode "Derailed", Chris Bauer guest-starred as Dr. Theodore Bryar, who has paranoid schizophrenia and held several passengers hostage, including Elle Greenaway, on a train. Jeff Kober guest-starred as Bryar's imaginary friend, Leo, and M. C. Gainey guest-starred as Detective Frank Moretti, who leads the investigation of the hostage situation. In the episode "The Popular Kids", Will Rothhaar guest-starred as Cory Bridges, a cult killer who murdered two high school students. In the episode "Blood Hungry", Kris Lemche guest-starred as cannibalistic spree killer, Eddie Mays, and Lindsay Crouse played his mother, Mary. In the episode "What Fresh Hell?", Ned Vaughn guest-starred as Donald Curtis, a pedophile who abducts an eleven-year-old girl named Belinda Copeland.

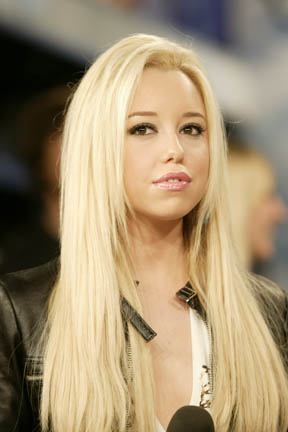
Skyler Shaye appears in the episode "The Tribe" as Ingrid Griesen.

In the episode "Poison", Nick Jameson guest-starred as Edward Hill, a serial killer who murders people with poisonous drugs. In the episode "Riding the Lightning", Jeannetta Arnette guest-starred as Sarah Jean Dawes, an inmate on death row who is determined to make sure her son never finds out the truth of his parentage. Michael Massee guest-starred as Jacob Dawes, her husband and a serial killer who murdered several teenage girls. In the episode "Unfinished Business", Aaron Lustig guest-starred as Walter Kern, aka "The Keystone Killer", and Geoff Pierson guest-starred as Max Ryan, a retired FBI Agent who is determined to find the killer.

In the episode "The Tribe", Chad Allen guest-starred as Jackson Cally, a cult leader who tortures and murders college students. In the episode "A Real Rain", Ethan Phillips guest-starred as schizophrenic vigilante killer Marvin Doyle. David Aaron Baker played Will Sykes, an attempted copycat of Doyle who wanted to be famous, and Tonya Pinkins played Detective Nora Bennett, who leads the investigation of the killings. In the episode "Somebody's Watching", Katheryn Winnick guest-starred as Maggie Lowe, a serial killer and stalker who obsesses over actress Lila Archer, played by Amber Heard. Ian Anthony Dale guest-starred as Detective Owen Kim, who leads the investigation of the murders.

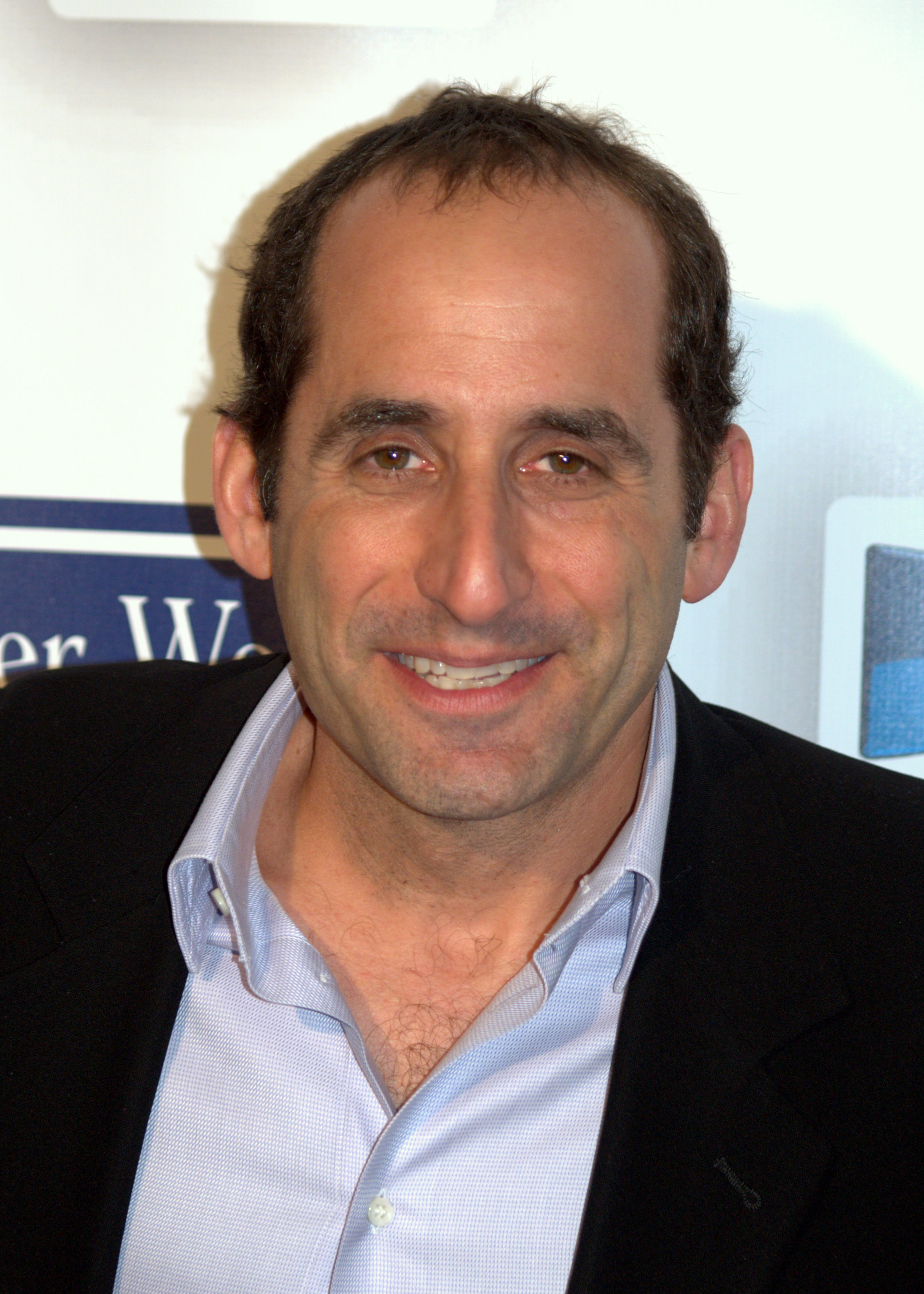
Peter Jacobson appears in the episode "Somebody's Watching" as Michael Ryer.

In the episode "Charm and Harm", Andy Comeau guest-starred as Mark Gregory, a serial killer and abductor who murders his victims by drowning them. In the episode, "Secrets and Lies", Ray Baker guest-starred as rogue CIA Agent Bruno Hawks. In the season finale "The Fisher King (Part I)", Charles Haid guest-starred as one of the series most notorious criminals, Randall Garner, aka "The Fisher King", a serial killer and abductor responsible for the attempted murder of Elle Greenaway. The incident proved to be so traumatizing, she resigned from the BAU the following season.

== Episodes ==
No. overall	No. in season	Title	Directed by	Written by	Original release date	Prod. code	U.S. viewers (millions)
1	1	"Extreme Aggressor"	Richard Shepard	Jeff Davis	September 22, 2005	101	19.57
When a Seattle, Washington woman goes missing and authorities connect her disappearance with the unsolved murders of three other women, the FBI's Behavioral Analysis Unit sets out to apprehend the killer and rescue his latest victim. Unit chief Aaron Hotchner is assigned to determine whether veteran profiler Jason Gideon, called out of medical leave for this case, is fit to return to duty permanently.
2	2	"Compulsion"	Charles Haid	Jeff Davis	September 28, 2005	102	10.57
When the latest in a series of fires at a Tempe, Arizona university kills a student, the BAU attempts to think outside the box as they juggle profiling the serial arsonist-turned-killer and preventing them from setting another fire. Gideon recovers from a near-death experience and the team welcomes sex crimes expert Elle Greenaway (Lola Glaudini) into the fold.
3	3	"Won't Get Fooled Again"	Kevin Bray	Aaron Zelman	October 5, 2005	103	11.98
When two explosions rip through Palm Beach, Florida communities, the BAU attempts to track down a bomber who is deliberately replicating the M.O. of incarcerated mass murderer Adrian Bale (Tim Kelleher) and Gideon finds himself forced to relive his memories of the events surrounding his encounter with Bale and subsequent nervous breakdown.
4	4	"Plain Sight"	Matt Earl Beesley	Edward Allen Bernero	October 12, 2005	104	13.76
When six San Diego, California women are raped, murdered, and posed with their eyes glued open, the BAU sets out to profile a killer who evades the authorities by striking in broad daylight and blending into the neighborhoods he targets.
5	5	"Broken Mirror"	Guy Norman Bee	Judith McCreary	October 19, 2005	105	12.79
When the daughter of a New York City Executive Assistant U.S. Attorney is abducted while leaving a party and her boyfriend is shot execution-style, the BAU juggles protecting the victim's twin sister, identifying the motive behind the kidnapping, and determining whether or not the abductor is one of their own.
6	6	"L.D.S.K."	Ernest Dickerson	Andrew Wilder	November 2, 2005	106	16.22
When a Des Plaines, Illinois sniper non-lethally guns down six people and unintentionally kills one, the BAU works with local authorities to prevent him from executing another attack. Reid finds himself forced to work without a gun after failing his firearms qualification exam.
7	7	"The Fox"	Guy Norman Bee	Simon Mirren	November 9, 2005	107	15.09
When two families of four — one in Maryland and the other in Arlington County, Virginia — are found dead days after they were supposed to leave on vacation, the BAU sets out to profile a family annihilator who sees himself as the perfect father figure and is dedicated to punishing what he believes to be dysfunctional families.
8	8	"Natural Born Killer"	Peter Ellis	Debra J. Fisher & Erica Messer	November 16, 2005	109	14.36
When an undercover agent disappears the same night a Baltimore, Maryland family is found dead in two separate locations, the BAU works with the Organized Crime Unit to apprehend a hitman responsible for over 100 murders.
9	9	"Derailed"	Félix Alcalá	Jeff Davis	November 23, 2005	108	12.83
A schizophrenic physicist suffers a mental breakdown and takes five hostages, including Elle, on a passenger train en route to Dallas, Texas, but not before he murders a security guard. Reid and the BAU attempt to establish trust with the shooter and prevent further casualties by going along with the man's hallucinations.
10	10	"The Popular Kids"	Andy Wolk	Edward Allen Bernero	November 30, 2005	110	15.56
When a teenage Virginia boy is found dead near Massanutten Mountain and his girlfriend is reported missing, the BAU attempts to determine whether or not the crimes were committed by a Satanic cult. Reid confides in his teammates about his battle with a series of recurring nightmares.
11	11	"Blood Hungry"	Charles Haid	Ed Napier	December 14, 2005	111	15.23
When two seemingly unrelated murders take place in Tennessee, the BAU launches a manhunt for a cannibalistic killer obsessed with a local seven-year-old boy. After injuring his leg in what he claims to be a skydiving accident, Gideon finds himself forced to work remotely from Quantico, invading Garcia's space and driving her to distraction.
12	12	"What Fresh Hell?"	Adam Davidson	Judith McCreary	January 11, 2006	112	15.92
When an 11-year-old girl is abducted from a Wilmington, Delaware community park in broad daylight, the BAU works with local authorities to determine whether or not her father was responsible.
13	13	"Poison"	Thomas J. Wright	Aaron Zelman	January 18, 2006	113	14.10
When eight Beachwood, New Jersey residents are poisoned with a combination of LSD and rohypnol, the BAU juggles identifying the poisoner and preventing a mass murder from taking place.
14	14	"Riding the Lightning"	Chris Long	Simon Mirren	January 25, 2006	114	14.65
On death row, only hours before their execution, the BAU is interviewing husband-and-wife serial killers convicted of the murders of over 18 Florida teenage girls. Gideon suspects the wife is innocent and sets out to prove his theory before time runs out.
15	15	"Unfinished Business"	J. Miller Tobin	Debra J. Fisher & Erica Messer	March 1, 2006	115	11.72
A notorious Philadelphia, Pennsylvania serial killer seemingly resurfaces after an 18-year absence, but with differing methods and older victims, and sends a taunting letter to retired FBI profiler Max Ryan (Geoff Pierson). The BAU struggles to determine if this is a copycat or if the killer has resumed his killing spree.
16	16	"The Tribe"	Matt Earl Beesley	Andrew Wilder	March 8, 2006	116	15.27
When five New Mexico college students are tortured, mutilated, and murdered, the BAU determines the crime was a pack killing by a racist, Manson Family-type cult, obsessed with pretending to be Native Americans. Hotch endures a tense reunion with his estranged brother Sean.
17	17	"A Real Rain"	Gloria Muzio	Chris Mundy	March 22, 2006	117	12.10
When three people are gunned down in New York City, the BAU sets out to track down a vigilante bent on exacting vengeance against criminals who got away with their crimes.
18	18	"Somebody's Watching"	Paul Shapiro	Ed Napier	March 29, 2006	118	12.54
While conducting a profiling seminar in Los Angeles, California, Gideon and Reid set out to identify a murderous stalker obsessed with television starlet Lila Archer (Amber Heard), but Lila's growing attraction to Reid threatens to jeopardize the investigation.
19	19	"Machismo"	Guy Norman Bee	Aaron Zelman	April 12, 2006	119	11.76
When 12 elderly women are raped and murdered in Mexico, the BAU faces resistance from local authorities as they attempt to identify the perpetrator. Meanwhile, Hotch juggles his responsibilities at work and at home.
20	20	"Charm and Harm"	Félix Alcalá	Debra J. Fisher & Erica Messer	April 19, 2006	120	13.53
When four young women are abducted, tortured, and drowned in hotel bathtubs around Tampa, Florida, the BAU sets out to apprehend a serial killer who changes his appearance to evade capture.
21	21	"Secrets and Lies"	Matt Earl Beesley	Simon Mirren	May 3, 2006	121	12.17
When an undercover CIA agent is tortured to death after helping an informant hide from her physically abusive yet high-powered husband, the BAU interrogates the four counter-terrorism agents connected to her case in an attempt to expose the traitor.
22	22	"The Fisher King: Part 1"	Edward Allen Bernero	Edward Allen Bernero	May 10, 2006	122	12.67
When each individual BAU member receives a mysterious message while on bureau-mandated vacation, the team suspects they have become pawns in an elaborate fantasy game and sets out to identify a budding serial killer with a deadly fixation on Arthurian legend.

== Home media ==
The Complete First Season
Set details		Special features
22 episodes; 6-disc set; Widescreen; Subtitles: English; English: Dolby Digital 5.1		Deleted Scenes; The Making of Criminal Minds; Inside Quantico & The Criminal Mind; Meet Matthew Gray Gubler
DVD release date
Region 1	Region 2	Region 4
November 28, 2006	February 12, 2007	November 3, 2007
