= Criminal Minds season 6 =

Season of television series Criminal Minds

Criminal Minds
- Season 6
- Season 6 U.S. DVD cover
- Starring: Joe Mantegna; Paget Brewster; Shemar Moore; Matthew Gray Gubler; A. J. Cook; Kirsten Vangsness; Rachel Nichols; Thomas Gibson
- No. of episodes: 24

Release
- Original network: CBS
- Original release: September 22, 2010 – May 18, 2011

Season chronology
- ← Previous; Season 5 Next → Season 7

The sixth season of Criminal Minds premiered on CBS on September 22, 2010 and ended May 18, 2011.

Before the filming of the season began, it was announced that A. J. Cook had been let go from the series, reportedly due to budget cuts on the show relating to the launch of the Criminal Minds spinoff. Thanks to letters and petitions by fans, Cook was allowed to return for the first two episodes to wrap up her character's storyline. She later returned as a special guest star in two subsequent episodes of this season. Paget Brewster was a regular for eighteen episodes and was let go from the series as well. Rachel Nichols appeared as a guest star for two episodes and was then promoted as a regular, but her contract wasn't picked up after the season finale.

The opening sequence changed this season: more sound and visual effects were added; the theme song itself was amplified, and an electric guitar part was added.

== Cast ==
=== Main ===
- Joe Mantegna as Supervisory Special Agent David Rossi (BAU Senior Agent)
- Paget Brewster as Supervisory Special Agent Emily Prentiss (BAU Agent) (Episodes 1–18)
- Shemar Moore as Supervisory Special Agent Derek Morgan (BAU Agent)
- Matthew Gray Gubler as Supervisory Special Agent Dr. Spencer Reid (BAU Agent)
- A. J. Cook as Supervisory Special Agent Jennifer "JJ" Jareau (BAU Communications Liaison) (Episodes 1–2)
- Kirsten Vangsness as Special Agent Penelope Garcia (BAU Technical Analyst & Co-Communications Liaison)
- Rachel Nichols as Special Agent Ashley Seaver (BAU Agent) (Episodes 10–24)
- Thomas Gibson as Supervisory Special Agent Aaron "Hotch" Hotchner (BAU Unit Chief & Co-Communications Liaison)

=== Recurring ===
- Jayne Atkinson as Supervisory Special Agent Erin Strauss (BAU Section Chief)
- Cade Owens as Jack Hotchner
- Isabella Murad as Ellie Spicer
- Timothy V. Murphy as Ian Doyle
- Sebastian Roché as Clyde Easter
- Siena Goines as Tsia Mosely
- Nicholas Brendon as Kevin Lynch
- A. J. Cook as Special Agent Jennifer "JJ" Jareau (Episodes 18, 24)

== Guest stars ==
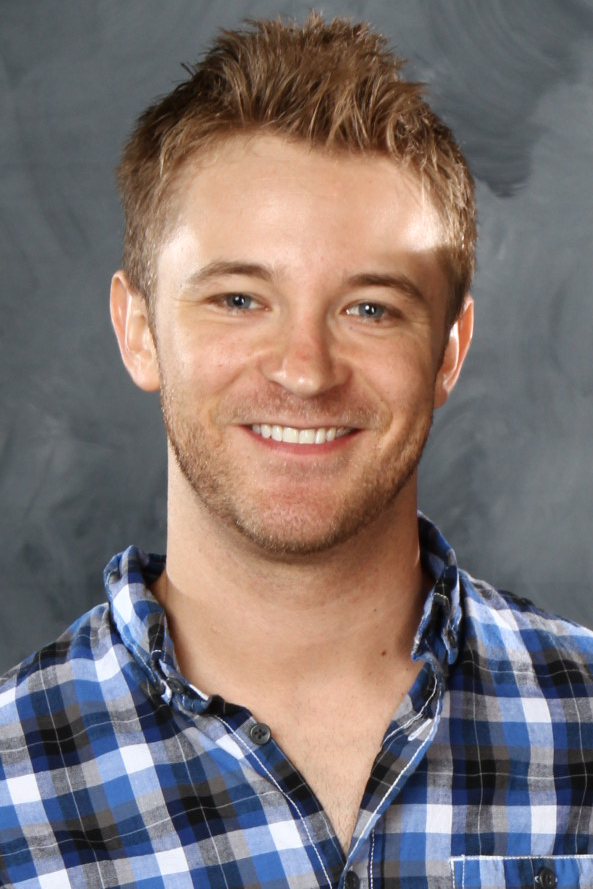
Michael Welch appears in the episode "J.J." as Sydney Xavier Pearson.

In the season premiere "The Longest Night", Tim Curry reprised his role as one of the series' most notorious criminals, Billy Flynn, also known as "The Prince of Darkness". Robert Davi reprised his role as Detective Adam Kurzbard, who led the investigation of the murders. In the episode "J.J.", Chris Marquette guest-starred as James Barrett, a man who abducted and attempted to murder Kate Joyce. In the episode "Remembrance of Things Past", Daniel J. Travanti guest-starred as Lee Mullens, a serial killer who suffers from Alzheimer's disease. In the episode "Compromising Positions", Craig Sheffer guest-starred as James Thomas, an impotent serial killer who murders married couples.

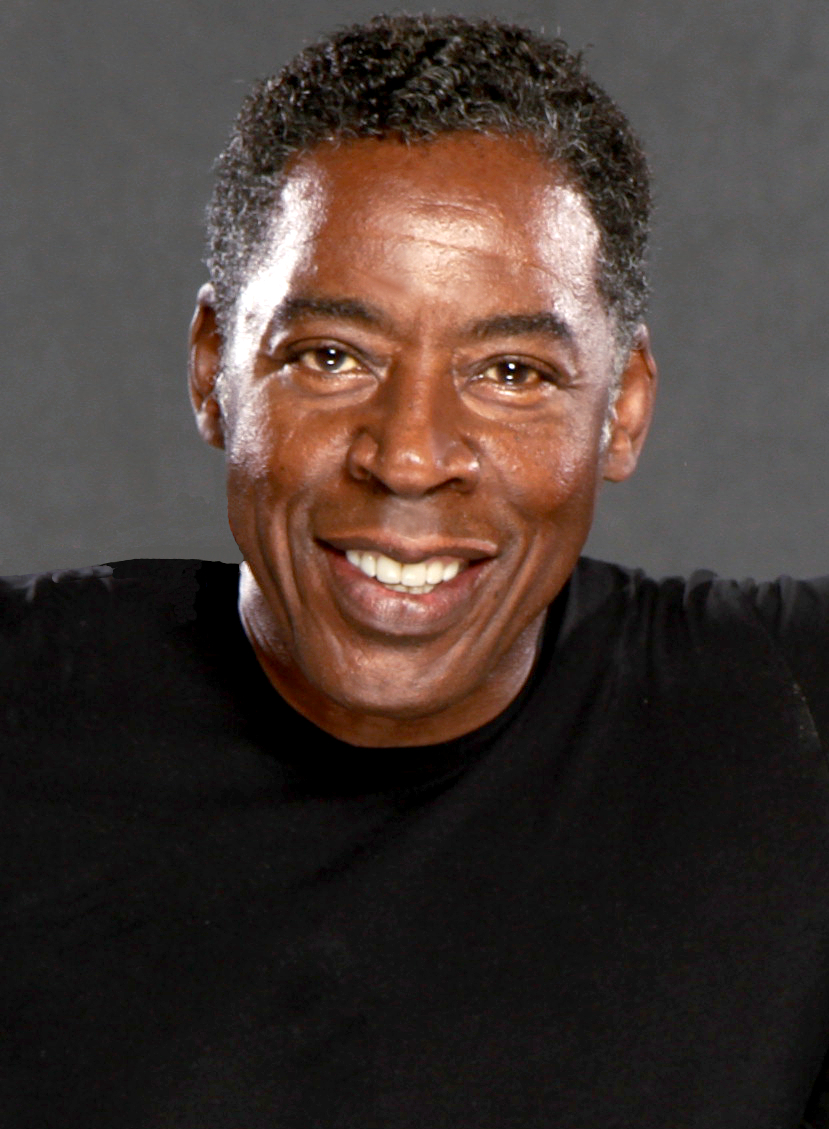
Ernie Hudson appears in the episode "Devil's Night" as Lt. Al Garner.

In the episode "Safe Haven", Sterling Beaumon guest-starred as Jeremy Sayers, a juvenile delinquent and family annihilator who has been hated by his mother ever since he was born. Mare Winningham guest-starred as Nancy Riverton, a mother who allows Jeremy to stay in their home for the night. In the episode "Devil's Night", Leonard Roberts guest-starred as Kaman Scott, a disfigured serial killer who burns his victims alive during Devil's Night, the notorious pre-Halloween celebration. In the episode "Middle Man", Steve Talley, Michael Grant Terry, and Jake Thomas guest-starred as Michael Kosina, Christopher Salters, and Scott Kagan, aka "The Johnson County Brotherhood", a trio of serial rapists and killers who abduct exotic dancers. Melissa Claire Egan guest starred as Tara Dice, an exotic dancer who is questioned by Prentiss and Reid.

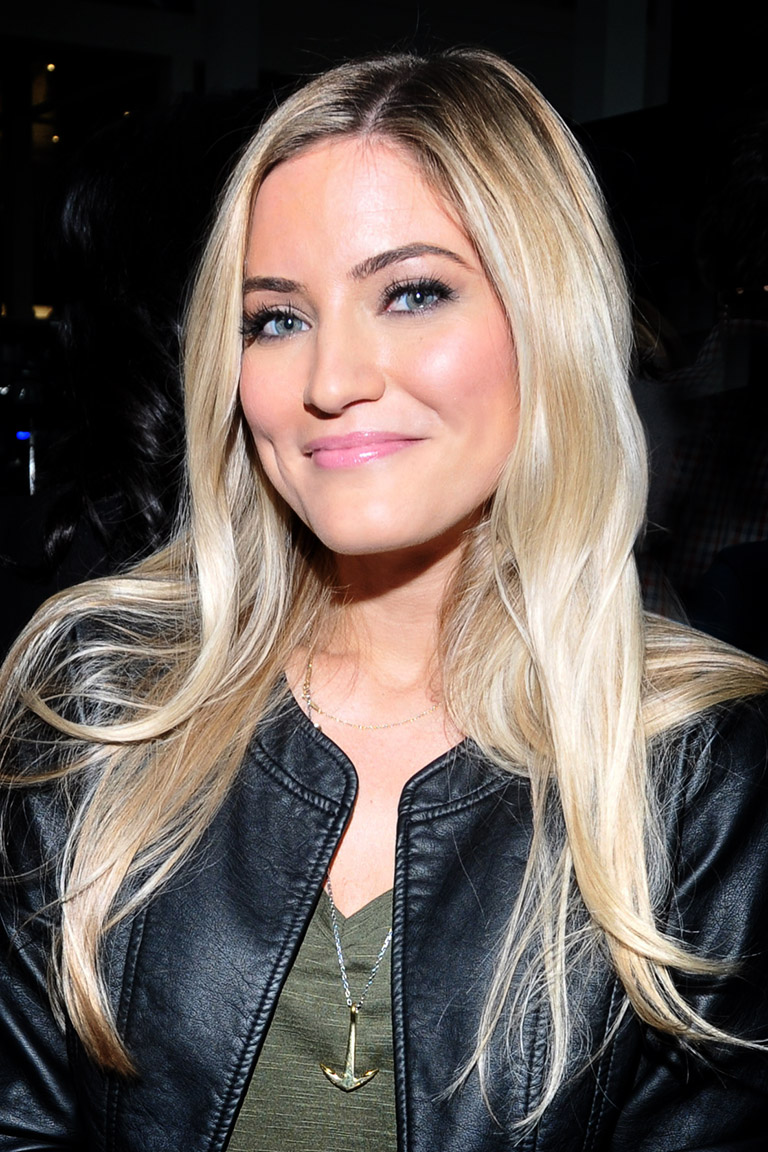
Justine Ezarik appears in the episode "Middle Man" as Meredith Joy.

In the episode "Reflection of Desire", Robert Knepper guest-starred as Rhett Walden, also known as "The Hill Ripper", a schizophrenic abductor who idolizes the movie Reflection of Desire, a film his deceased mother starred in. Sally Kirkland guest-starred as May Walden, a famous actress from Hollywood's Golden Age who, because of her pregnancy, made only one motion picture, and her career was ruined afterwards. Whitney Able guest-starred as Penny Hanley, a woman Walden abducts after Kelly Landis' murder. In the episode "Into the Woods", Gattlin Griffith guest-starred as Robert Brooks, a young boy who is abducted and raped by Shane Wyland. Emily Alyn Lind guest-starred as Anna Brooks, Robert's younger sister who is also abducted by Wyland.

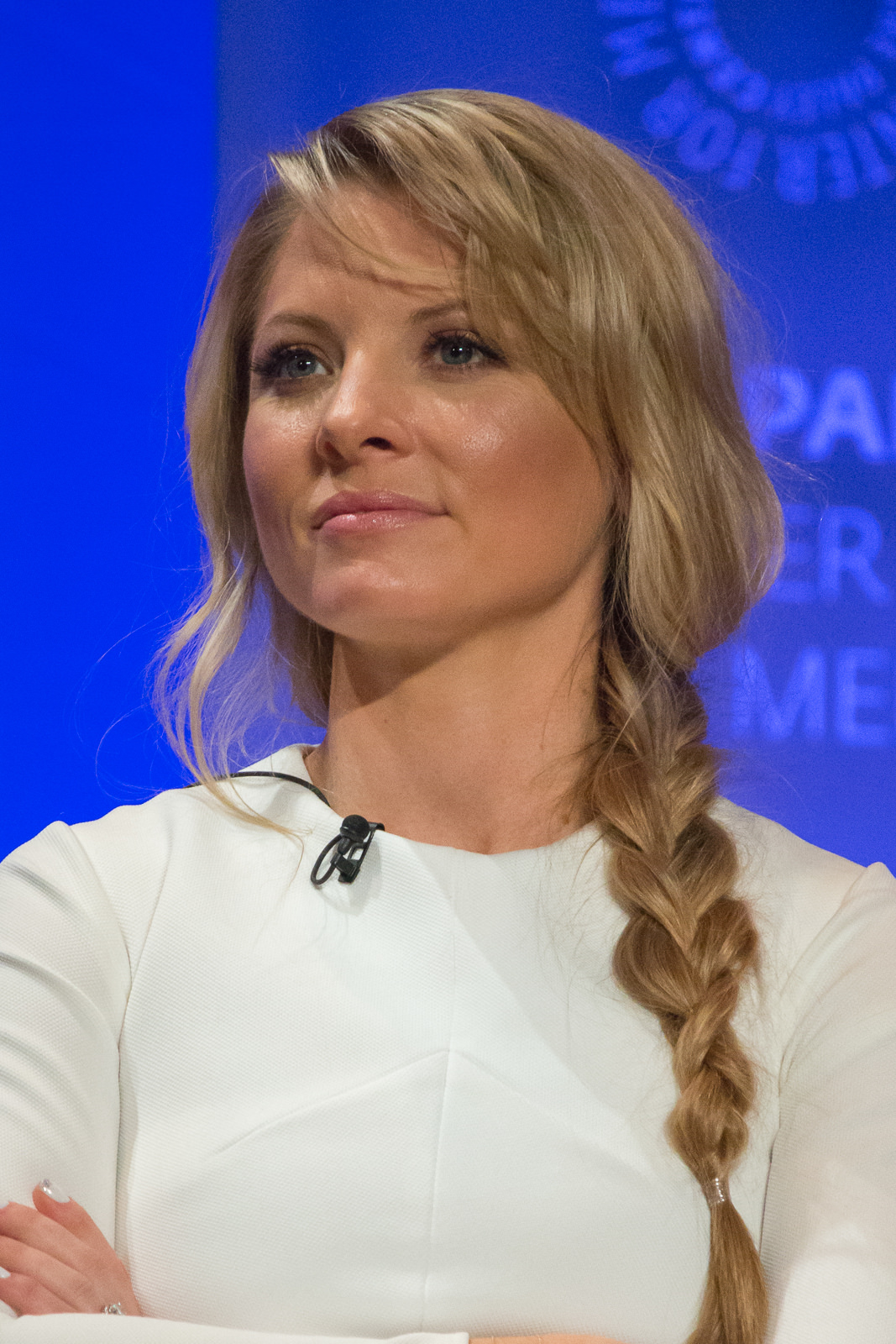
Empire star Kaitlin Doubleday appears in the episode "Reflection of Desire" as Kelly Landis.

In the episode "What Happens at Home", Kenneth Mitchell guest-starred as Drew Jacobs, a serial killer who murders several women, including his own wife. Madison Leisle guest starred as Jacobs' daughter, Heather. In the episode "25 to Life", Kyle Secor guest-starred as Donald Sanderson, a man who was framed and imprisoned for the murder of his family, and Philip Casnoff guest-starred as James Stanworth, the man responsible for framing Sanderson and murdering his family. Angus Macfadyen guest-starred as Sean McCallister, Emily Prentiss' former boss at Interpol who is murdered by one of the series most notorious criminals, Ian Doyle, played by Timothy V. Murphy. In the episode "The Thirteenth Step", Jonathan Tucker and Adrianne Palicki guest-starred as Raymond Donovan and Sydney Manning, two young lovers who go on a killing spree.

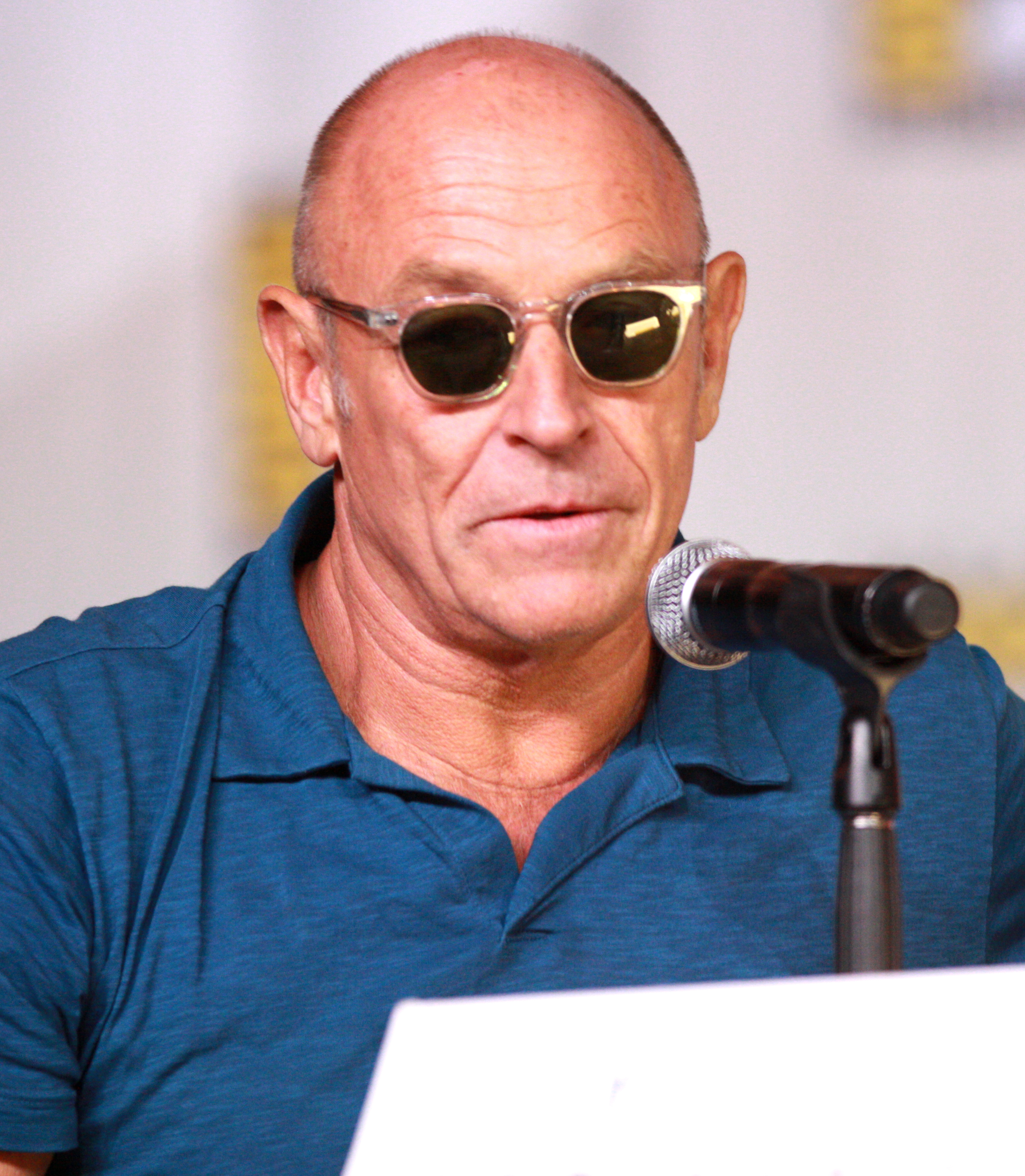
L.A. Law and Psych star Corbin Bernsen appears in the episode "Today I Do" as Jerry Grandin.

In the episode "Today I Do", Rebecca Field guest-starred as Jane Gould, a stalker and abductor who acts as a caretaker so she can be appreciated. Rachel Miner guest-starred as Molly Grandin, a woman who Gould abducts and holds captive in her house. In the episode "Coda", Lew Temple guest-starred as Bill Thomas, a man who abducts the parents of Sammy Sparks, a boy who has autism. Mimi Kennedy guest-starred as Sammy's social worker Miss Rogers. In the episode "Lauren", Patrick Fischler guest-starred as Jack Fahey, an Irish mobster and an associate of Ian Doyle. In the episode "With Friends Like These", Bug Hall guest-starred as Ben Foster, a schizophrenic spree killer who, after burning down a church, begins hallucinating three people who died there.

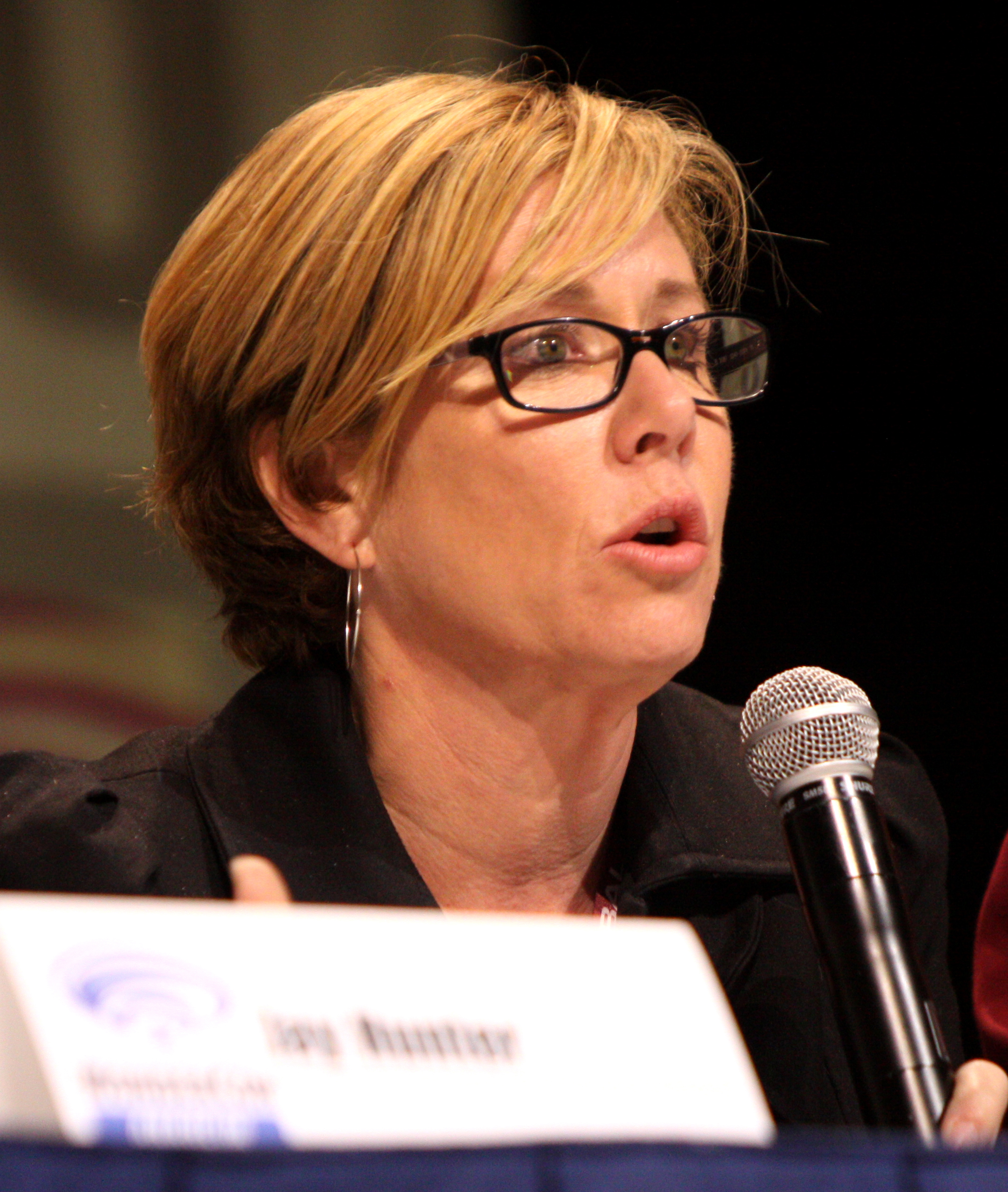
Romy Rosemont appears in the episode "Coda" as Elizabeth Sparks.

In the episode "Hanley Waters", Kelli Williams guest-starred as Shelly Chamberlain, a spree killer who is unable to come to terms with the death of her son, who died in a car crash. In the episode "Out of the Light", Jeffrey Meek guest-starred as Robert Bremmer, a serial killer who raped his stepdaughter, Rose, and began abducting, raping, and murdering women who resemble Rose. In the season finale "Supply and Demand", Angela Sarafyan guest-starred as Lucy, the leader of a human trafficking ring who poses as one of the victims. Amy Price-Francis guest-starred as Supervisory Special Agent Andi Swan, the Unit Chief of the Domestic Trafficking Task Force and Sarah Foret guest-starred as Renee Matlin, an FBI undercover agent who is held captive within the ring.

In the episode "The Thirteenth Step", Jonathan Tucker and Adrianne Palicki guest-starred as Raymond Donovan and Sydney Manning, two young lovers who go on an interstate killing spree. Palicki portrayed the psychopathic thrill killer Manning, whose Bonnie and Clyde-style romance with Donovan serves as the focal point of the episode's investigation.

== Episodes ==
No. overall	No. in season	Title	Directed by	Written by	Original release date	Prod. code	U.S. viewers (millions)
115	1	"The Longest Night"	Edward Allen Bernero	Edward Allen Bernero	September 22, 2010	601	14.13
With Detective Spicer dead, his younger sister hospitalized with life-threatening injuries, his eight-year-old daughter missing, Los Angeles still suffering from citywide blackouts, and the "Prince of Darkness" (Tim Curry) still at large, the BAU finds themselves in a race against time as they work to track down the girl and her kidnapper.
116	2	"J.J."	Charles S. Carroll	Erica Messer	September 29, 2010	602	14.57
When a teenage Maryland girl disappears and the prime suspects pass a polygraph test despite being the last people to see her alive, the BAU juggles extracting a confession and dealing with the missing girl's overprotective father. Meanwhile, JJ contemplates accepting a major job promotion that could impact her future with the team.
117	3	"Remembrance of Things Past"	Glenn Kershaw	Janine Sherman Barrois	October 6, 2010	604	13.87
When two Bristol, Virginia women are tortured, sodomized, and fatally electrocuted, the BAU sets out to determine whether or not "The Butcher" (Daniel J. Travanti), a prolific serial killer who murdered 20 women in the same area over nine years, has resurfaced after a 17-year absence.
118	4	"Compromising Positions"	Guy Norman Bee	Breen Frazier	October 13, 2010	603	14.00
When two Akron, Ohio couples are killed after being forced to have sex, the BAU sets out to track down a serial killer attempting to compensate for his own impotence. Meanwhile, Garcia attempts to convince Hotch to allow her to fill in for JJ as communications liaison.
119	5	"Safe Haven"	Andy Wolk	Alicia Kirk	October 20, 2010	605	14.46
When two families of four — one in Omaha, Nebraska and the other in Council Bluffs, Iowa — are murdered in their homes, the BAU attempts to track down a psychopathic teenager with a desire to punish matriarchal figures. Meanwhile, a former victim from a prior case visits Morgan unexpectedly.
120	6	"Devil's Night"	Charlie Haid	Randy Huggins	October 27, 2010	606	13.94
When a Detroit, Michigan man is abducted and burned alive two days before Halloween, the BAU juggles connecting the crime to a series of pre-Halloween arson attacks in which six other people in the same area were killed over the last two years and tracking down a killer bent on exacting vengeance against the people he feels have wronged him.
121	7	"Middle Man"	Rob Spera	Rick Dunkle	November 3, 2010	607	14.58
When three Indiana exotic dancers are found dead in cornfields around Johnson County and a fourth is reported missing, the BAU rushes to profile a trio of killers who rape and torture their victims over the course of two days before finishing them off.
122	8	"Reflection of Desire"	Anna J. Foerster	Simon Mirren	November 10, 2010	608	12.56
When a Washington, D.C. woman is found dead in an alley with her lips cut off and a mysterious piece of paper stuffed down her throat, the BAU sets out to track down a budding abductor who forces his victims to reenact a scene from a 1950s film. Meanwhile, Garcia attempts to help the team identify the killer by exposing a piece of her personal life.
123	9	"Into the Woods"	Glenn Kershaw	Kimberly Ann Harrison	November 17, 2010	609	14.39
When a missing 10-year-old boy is found dead near the Appalachian Trail in Pennsylvania and a brother and sister aged 10 and eight, respectively, subsequently disappear from around the same area, the BAU attempts to profile and apprehend a pedophilic killer responsible for the abductions and murders of several children over the last 10 years.
124	10	"What Happens at Home"	Jan Eliasberg	Edward Allen Bernero	December 8, 2010	610	14.23
When three Las Cruces, New Mexico women living in the same gated community are strangled to death, the BAU recruits FBI cadet Ashley Seaver (Rachel Nichols) to help them run background checks on the development's residents and identify the killer. Meanwhile, the team uncovers a dark truth about Seaver's past.
125	11	"25 to Life"	Charles S. Carroll	Erica Messer	December 15, 2010	611	13.77
With Hotch taking time off to commemorate the anniversary of Haley's death, the remaining members of the BAU set out to determine if a Petersburg, Virginia inmate, who is set to be paroled after serving 25 years for the murders of his wife and daughter, is innocent, only to find themselves doubting his original claims when he is accused of killing a Washington, D.C. man two days after his release. Meanwhile, Prentiss approaches Rossi with an unusual request involving Seaver's remedial training.
126	12	"Corazón"	John Gallagher	Katarina Wittich	January 19, 2011	612	12.02
When three people are found dead in a Latino neighborhood in Miami, Florida, with the first two victims each missing a finger and the latest victim missing both hands, the BAU determines the killer is obsessed with completing a specific ritual found in Afro-Caribbean religions. Meanwhile, Reid calls his well-being into question after starting to suffer prolonged headaches and hallucinations.
127	13	"The Thirteenth Step"	Doug Aarniokoski	Janine Sherman Barrois	January 26, 2011	613	12.77
When two mass shootings at different Montana gas stations — one in Miles City and the other in Billings — claim the lives of 14 people, the BAU juggles profiling a newlywed couple and determining whether they are committing murder for the thrill of violence or seeking revenge against their families. Meanwhile, Prentiss receives disturbing news about a ghost from her past.
128	14	"Sense Memory"	Rob Spera	Randy Huggins	February 9, 2011	614	13.67
When three Los Angeles, California women are abducted, drowned in methanol, and found with a piece of skin removed from the sole of their right foot, the BAU races to determine a serial killer's bizarre agenda. Meanwhile, Morgan notices a drastic change in Prentiss' behavior.
129	15	"Today I Do"	Ali Selim	Alicia Kirk	February 16, 2011	615	12.85
When a female Syracuse, New York undergraduate student goes missing and her disappearance is connected to the unsolved murder of another woman from four months earlier, the BAU sets out to profile a sadistic female serial killer who sees herself as a motivational coach. Meanwhile, Prentiss grows increasingly concerned after receiving an update from her former Interpol colleagues.
130	16	"Coda"	Rob Hardy	Rick Dunkle	February 23, 2011	616	13.15
When a Lafayette Parish, Louisiana couple disappears and their autistic 10-year-old son walks into school covered in blood, the BAU juggles communicating with the boy and profiling his parents' kidnapper. Meanwhile, Prentiss' secret mission to track down her Interpol team's greatest enemy reaches an earth-shattering climax.
131	17	"Valhalla"	Charles S. Carroll	Simon Mirren & Erica Messer	March 2, 2011	617	14.37
When two Washington, D.C. families are murdered and their homes are set on fire after their deaths, the BAU sets out to catch an international crime lord (Timothy V. Murphy) determined to fulfill a sinister agenda. Meanwhile, Prentiss struggles to keep her past a secret from the rest of the team.
132	18	"Lauren"	Matthew Gray Gubler	Breen Frazier	March 16, 2011	618	13.73
When Prentiss disappears following the death of a former Interpol teammate, the BAU reunites with JJ in an attempt to learn more about their missing colleague's history with crime lord Ian Doyle and the series of events that led to his arrest eight years earlier.
133	19	"With Friends Like These..."	Anna J. Foerster	Janine Sherman Barrois	March 30, 2011	619	13.05
With Prentiss dead, Doyle still at large, and Seaver officially an FBI agent and team member, the BAU travels to Portland, Oregon to investigate the robberies and murders of a DJ and a nurse and determine whether the crimes were committed by one person or a gang with a pack mentality. Meanwhile, Reid becomes emotionally involved after an unexpected twist changes the course of the investigation.
134	20	"Hanley Waters"	Jesse Warn	Alicia Kirk & Randy Huggins	April 6, 2011	620	14.08
When a shooting at a Tampa, Florida gun shop claims the lives of four men, the BAU attempts to profile a budding spree killer determined to avenge a traumatic loss. Meanwhile, Hotch interviews each individual team member about their feelings regarding the loss of Prentiss.
135	21	"The Stranger"	Nelson McCormick	Kimberly Ann Harrison & Rick Dunkle	April 13, 2011	621	13.59
When three female San Diego, California college students are stabbed to death in their off-campus homes, the BAU sets out to track down a stalker-turned-serial killer who targets women resembling a face from his past. Meanwhile, Hotch comes under scrutiny after Section Chief Strauss starts reviewing the team's grief assessment forms.
136	22	"Out of the Light"	Doug Aarniokoski	Roger Hedden	May 4, 2011	622	12.90
When a severely injured North Carolina woman is found unconscious at the bottom of a roadside cliff and her injuries are determined to be consistent with those found on an unidentified corpse that was discovered three years earlier, the BAU juggles profiling a sexual sadist and determining whether there are other victims.
137	23	"Big Sea"	Glenn Kershaw	Jim Clemente & Breen Frazier	May 11, 2011	623	13.29
When a Jacksonville, Florida pumping crew uncovers an underwater mass grave with 12 sets of skeletal remains, the BAU sets out to establish a connection between the victims and the killer. Meanwhile, Morgan becomes personally involved in the case after his aunt arrives in Florida with suspicions that her daughter, who disappeared seven years earlier, is among the dead.
138	24	"Supply and Demand"	Charles S. Carroll	Erica Messer	May 18, 2011	624	12.84
When a Virginia man dies after accidentally driving his car into a ravine and two missing people — an Arizona man and an Ohio woman — are found dead in his trunk, the BAU determines the driver was a customer of a human trafficking ring, so they work with SSA Andi Swan (Amy Price-Francis) and the FBI's Domestic Trafficking Task Force to shut down the ring and apprehend its members. Meanwhile, Hotch warns the team of possible restructuring and a familiar face makes an unexpected decision.

== Home media ==
The Complete Sixth Season
Set details		Special features
24 episodes; 6-disc set; Aspect Ratio: 1.85:1; Subtitles: English; English: Dolby Digital 5.1		Making Criminal Minds Season 6; Crime Scenes; From Script to Screen: Agent Down; Greg St. Johns' CMS6 Yearbook; Gag Reel; Deleted Scenes
DVD release date
Region 1	Region 2	Region 4
September 6, 2011	November 28, 2011	November 30, 2011
