= 100 (Criminal Minds) =

- Criminal Minds episode
- Episode no.: Season 5 Episode 9
- Directed by: Edward Allen Bernero
- Written by: Bo Crese
- Original air date: November 25, 2009
- Running time: 43 minutes

Guest appearances
- Meredith Monroe as Haley Hotchner; C. Thomas Howell as The Reaper / George Foyet; D.B. Sweeney as U.S. Marshal Kassmeyer; Nicholas Brendon as Kevin Lynch; Josh Stewart as William LaMontagne Jr.; Brian Appel as Agent Anderson; Cade Owens as Jack Hotchner; Jayne Atkinson as Erin Strauss

Episode chronology
← Previous "Outfoxed"	Next → "The Slave of Duty"
- Criminal Minds (season 5)

"100" is the ninth episode of the fifth season of the American police procedural crime drama television series Criminal Minds, and the 100th episode of the series overall. Written by Bo Crese and directed by Edward Allen Bernero, the episode originally aired on CBS on November 25, 2009.

== Plot ==
In the beginning, the BAU team members are being interviewed individually by Section Chief Erin Strauss (Jayne Atkinson) for an internal investigation concerning Unit Chief Aaron Hotchner (Thomas Gibson). George Foyet a.k.a. "The Reaper" (C. Thomas Howell) had been corresponding with Karl Arnold while the latter was in prison. The team discovers Foyet became dependent on medications after he'd stabbed himself repeatedly. When a pharmacist explains to JJ (A. J. Cook) that one allergy medication could be replaced with another, JJ figures out there must be certain medications that Foyet takes that cannot be substituted. After discovering where the letters originated, Reid (Matthew Gray Gubler) starts to create anagrams for "The Reaper" to figure out the alias Foyet may be using, and he comes up with the name "Peter Rhea." Narrowing down the addresses on the letters along with the name and the probable name Foyet would use to pick up his medication, the team traces "Peter Rhea" to an apartment building in Arlington County, Virginia. However, Foyet is gone when they arrive, but they find a pile of mail near the door that indicates Foyet was aware the team knew his location, and had left abruptly before their arrival. Garcia (Kirsten Vangsness) hacks into Foyet's computer and discovers he had set up an internet alert for "Peter Rhea", which meant he would be alerted when anyone did a search on the name. Garcia also uncovers photos of Sam Kassmeyer (D. B. Sweeney), the U.S. Marshal assigned to protect Hotch's ex-wife, Haley (Meredith Monroe), and son, Jack (Cade Owens).

The team goes to the safe house, and they find Kassmeyer seriously injured, shot and stabbed by Foyet. Kassmeyer apologizes to Hotch, and reveals that Foyet had stolen his cell phone and repeatedly called random numbers on the speed dial until he reached Haley. On the phone, Foyet pretended to be a marshal and detailed to a terrified Haley that both Kassmeyer and Hotch were killed, so Haley and the new marshal needed to meet at her home. The mortally wounded Kassmeyer dies in the ambulance on the way to the hospital. Meanwhile, Hotch calls Foyet on his cell phone and threatens him repeatedly. Foyet responds that Haley looks good with dark hair. Haley, believing Foyet is the new marshal assigned to protect her and Jack, lets him into the house. During a frantic drive to his old house, Hotch calls Haley and speaks with Foyet. Foyet tells Haley how her ex-husband broke their deal by still trying to track him down. Therefore, he has to kill Hotch's family in retaliation. Hotch informs Jack that he needs to help his father work the case, and so Jack goes upstairs. Haley tells Hotch he needs to tell his son how they met so Jack would still believe in love. Foyet then shoots her three times to death as Hotch and the rest of the team listen on the phone.

Hotch arrives at his old house, enters, and discovers bloody footprints leading up the stairs. He finds Haley's body lying on the floor and sees a figure hiding behind the curtains. Hotch empties a clip into the hidden figure, who turns out to be Foyet wearing a bulletproof vest. Foyet falls to the floor and the two men engage in a brutal hand-to-hand fight. Hotch beats Foyet to death in a blind rage, even after Foyet surrenders. The rest of the team arrives. Morgan (Shemar Moore), Prentiss (Paget Brewster) and Rossi (Joe Mantegna) check upstairs and find Hotch still beating Foyet, causing Morgan to have to pull Hotch away from Foyet. Hotch goes to check on Jack, who had helped his father work the case by hiding in a chest – their secret plan designed to protect Jack. At the end of the internal investigation, the panel rules that Hotch's actions were acceptable under the circumstances.

== Production ==
The writer of this episode, Bo Crese, is actually an acronym used in the credits of "100". It is an acronym formed from the first letter of the name of every writer who contributed to the script: Breen Frazier, Oanh Ly, Chris Mundy, Rick Dunkle, Erica Messer, Simon Mirren and Edward Allen Bernero. This was used because each writer wrote a section of the episode. In an early draft of the script for this episode, Hotchner was written to kill George Foyet with his own knife. However, Edward Allen Bernero and Thomas Gibson believed the scene would be more powerful if Hotch used his bare hands.

Speaking about the 100th episode, showrunner Edward Allen Bernero said he wanted to revisit a question that was raised in the pilot of Criminal Minds:

"There's a question raised in the pilot episode of whether you can spend your time hunting monsters and not become a monster. We wanted to revisit that question 100 episodes later and see if the answer changed. Hotch does something that makes you wonder what's happened to everybody [since the start]."

== Reception ==
=== Ratings ===
The episode aired on CBS on November 25, 2009. Upon initial release, it was viewed by 13.61 million people and it also garnered a 3.2 Nielsen rating. "100" was also the week's third most watched drama and ranked tenth on the list of most watched television programmes overall.

=== Critical response ===
"100" was met with positive reviews, with particular praise towards the performances of Gibson, Monroe and Howell. The episode has received an average score of 9.1/10 on IMDb.

Anthony Ocasio from Screen Rant gave the episode a positive review, saying that it "had me sitting on the edge of my seat the entire way" and said the scene with the Reaper, Haley and Jack was "the most intense thing I’ve seen all year". CliqueClack praised Gibson's performance, saying that it "was a stunning performance by Gibson that cements his legacy as a top-tier actor".
