= Criminal Minds: Suspect Behavior =

2011 American police procedural drama television series

- Genre: Police procedural; Crime drama
- Created by: Edward Allen Bernero; Chris Mundy
- Starring: Forest Whitaker; Janeane Garofalo; Michael Kelly; Beau Garrett; Matt Ryan; Kirsten Vangsness; Richard Schiff
- Country of origin: United States
- Original language: English
- No. of seasons: 1
- No. of episodes: 13

Production
- Executive producers: Chris Mundy; Edward Allen Bernero; Mark Gordon; Deborah Spera
- Running time: 45 minutes
- Production companies: The Mark Gordon Company; Bernero Productions; ABC Studios; CBS Studios; Universal Media Studios

Original release
- Network: CBS
- Release: February 16 – May 25, 2011

Related
- Criminal Minds; Criminal Minds: Beyond Borders

Criminal Minds: Suspect Behavior is an American police procedural drama starring Forest Whitaker and Janeane Garofalo that aired on CBS. The show debuted on February 16, 2011, as a spin-off of Criminal Minds, aired on the same network, and is the second show in the Criminal Minds franchise. This edition's profiling team also worked for the Federal Bureau of Investigation's Behavioral Analysis Unit (BAU) in Quantico, Virginia. The series focuses on a small rapid response team called a "Red Cell" that reports to the FBI director. In an April 2010 episode of Criminal Minds ("The Fight"), during the show's fifth season, the original team met the new team and worked with them to find a San Francisco serial killer, with the episode serving as the new series' backdoor pilot.

Like the parent series, CBS owned the underlying American rights, while ABC owned the international rights. The series premiered on February 16, 2011, and filled the Wednesday 10:00 p.m. time slot, airing after Criminal Minds.

Due to low ratings, CBS canceled the series on May 17, 2011, and aired its final episode on May 25, 2011. On September 6, 2011, CBS released the complete series as a four-disc set, packaged as "The DVD Edition". There are numerous special features and two episode commentaries with the cast and crew. The set includes the backdoor pilot from season five of the original show. The series is also carried in rerun form on Ion Television as part of their existing agreement to carry Criminal Minds.

== Background ==
In early 2009, Michael Ausiello from Entertainment Weekly said that he and studios were discussing the possibility of a spin-off of the procedural crime drama Criminal Minds. Studio producer Ed Bernero confirmed it by disclosing that "it's safe to say there will be something soon." The show had a completely new cast, with the exception of Kirsten Vangsness, who reprised her role as Penelope Garcia. By late 2010, the director had been chosen, and the casting completed. It was announced that Forest Whitaker would star. Whitaker's character, Samuel "Sam" "Coop" Cooper, and his team were introduced in Criminal Minds Season 5. Richard Schiff had a recurring role as FBI Director Jack Fickler.

Samuel Cooper and his team set the stage for the spin-off in the 18th episode of the fifth season of Criminal Minds, "The Fight" (April 7, 2010). This "back-door pilot" approach was also used for other CBS shows that were introduced in original series, such as CSI: Miami (2002–2012), CSI: NY (2004–2013), CSI: Cyber (2015–2016), NCIS: Los Angeles (2009–2023), NCIS: New Orleans (2014–2021) and FBI: Most Wanted (2020-2025). Criminal Minds: Suspect Behavior was the first cancellation of CBS spinoffs and CSI: NY was picked up for an eighth season in its place.

== Characters ==
- Forest Whitaker as FBI SSA/ Team Leader Samuel "Sam" Cooper
- Janeane Garofalo as FBI Senior SSA Beth Griffith
- Michael Kelly as FBI Special Agent Jonathan "Prophet" Sims
- Beau Garrett as FBI SSA Gina LaSalle
- Matt Ryan as FBI SSA Mick Rawson
- Kirsten Vangsness as FBI Special Agent Technical Analyst Penelope Garcia
- Richard Schiff as FBI Director Jack Fickler

== Episodes ==
=== Backdoor pilot episode ===
This episode was introduced during the fifth-season episodes of Criminal Minds. The Criminal Minds episode "The Fight", served as backdoor pilot episode for the show.

Pilot episodes (Criminal Minds season 5)
No. overall	No. in season	Title	Directed by	Written by	Original release date	Prod. code	U.S. viewers (millions)
109	05	"The Fight"	Richard Shepard	Story by : Chris Mundy & Edward Allen Bernero; Teleplay by : Chris Mundy	April 7, 2010	518	12.70
When a homeless man is found dead in San Francisco, California and a father and his teenage daughter are subsequently abducted, the Red Cell Unit works with the BAU to track down a serial killer who forces his victims to fight each other to the death in brutal hand-to-hand matches. This episode launches the spin-off, Criminal Minds: Suspect Behavior.

=== Season 1 (2011) ===
No.	Title	Directed by	Written by	Original release date	Prod. code	U.S. viewers (millions)
1	"Two of a Kind"	John Terlesky	Rob Fresco	February 16, 2011	107	13.06
When an eight-year-old Cleveland, Ohio girl is abducted from outside her family's home in broad daylight, the Red Cell team juggles tracking down the kidnapper and connecting the case to another girl's disappearance from over a week earlier.
2	"Lonely Heart"	Michael Watkins	Shintaro Shimosawa	February 23, 2011	104	9.81
When three single businessmen are stabbed to death in high-end Cincinnati, Ohio hotels, the Red Cell team uncovers a shocking link between the crimes and the solved murders of three teenage girls from three years earlier.
3	"See No Evil"	Rob Spera	Barry Schindel	March 2, 2011	109	10.36
When a Tucson, Arizona man is found dead from drug-induced paralysis with his eyes removed, the Red Cell team sets out to track down a serial killer obsessed with an old Japanese proverb.
4	"One Shot Kill"	Terry McDonough	Rob Fresco	March 9, 2011	102	9.12
When a Chicago, Illinois serial sniper (Noel Fisher) guns down four people by delivering one shot to their heads, the Red Cell team is called in to profile him, only to become emotionally involved when he starts taunting them with his crimes upon learning Mick's history as a sniper himself.
5	"Here Is the Fire"	Andrew Bernstein	Chris Mundy & Ian Goldberg	March 16, 2011	101	10.33
When a pipe bomb detonates in a Fredericksburg, Virginia high school, killing and injuring several students and faculty members, the Red Cell team rushes to identify the perpetrator before another bombing occurs.
6	"Devotion"	Stephen Cragg	Shintaro Shimosawa	March 23, 2011	111	8.80
When two men — one in Omaha, Nebraska and the other in Joliet, Illinois — are found hanged, the Red Cell team works to track down a killer going across the country on a personal mission.
7	"Jane"	Rob Hardy	Glen Mazzara	March 30, 2011	108	9.53
When two Indianapolis, Indiana women disappear and a man witnessing the abduction of a third woman ends up in the emergency room with his throat slashed, the Red Cell team juggles profiling the kidnapper and locating his latest victim. The case becomes personal for the team when they cannot determine the third woman's identity upon learning she was never reported missing.
8	"Nighthawk"	Dwight Little	Ian Goldberg	April 6, 2011	106	9.12
When three Tulsa, Oklahoma men are found bludgeoned to death on the same night, the Red Cell team attempts to identify a killer seeking revenge against a man with the same physical description as the victims.
9	"Smother"	Phil Abraham	Joy Blake & Melissa Blake	April 13, 2011	105	9.96
When three Manchester, New Hampshire women are abducted and their babies are left behind at the crime scenes, the Red Cell team rushes to profile a family annihilator who suffered an abusive childhood. Meanwhile, Beth discovers that Mick is keeping a secret and attempts to find out what it is.
10	"The Time Is Now"	Tim Matheson	Joy Blake & Melissa Blake	May 4, 2011	110	8.83
When a female Los Angeles, California death row inmate convicted of manipulating three teenage boys into killing their parents 10 years earlier petitions a mistrial after two similar crimes recently occur, the Red Cell team must uncover everything they can about her past to officially close the case.
11	"Strays"	Anna J. Foerster	Chris Mundy & Glen Mazzara	May 11, 2011	103	9.31
When Director Fickler's goddaughter, who is also the estranged daughter of a Washington, D.C. federal judge, is abducted, the Red Cell team juggles tracking down the missing girl and profiling a predator who sells his victims into slavery.
12	"The Girl in the Blue Mask"	Félix Alcalá	Mark Richard	May 18, 2011	112	8.46
When a U.S. Marine sergeant is found dead with half of his face removed in a private military park in Quantico, Virginia, the FBI's backyard, the Red Cell team sets out to track down a serial killer with an unusual motivation.
13	"Death by a Thousand Cuts"	Edward Allen Bernero	Ian Goldberg	May 25, 2011	113	7.25
When three random people in Dallas, Texas are gunned down in heavily crowded areas, the Red Cell team sets out to catch an abductor/proxy killer who forces his victims' loved ones to commit murder in exchange for their safe return. Meanwhile, Prophet and Beth's lives are put on the line when an unexpected twist changes the course of the investigation.

== Home media ==
The DVD Edition
Set details		Special features
13 episodes; 4-disc set (Region 1 only); Widescreen; Subtitles: English; English: Dolby Digital 5.1		Alternate Reality: The New Criminal Minds; Inside The Red Cell; The Profiler; House of Corpses; Loved Ones; Backdoor-pilot from Criminal Minds Season 5: "The Fight"; Gag Reel; Deleted Scenes
DVD release date
Region 1	Region 2	Region 4
September 6, 2011	Not Released	Not Released

== Ratings ==
Season	Timeslot (EDT)	Series Premiere	Series Finale	TV Season	Rank	Viewers (in millions)
1	Wednesdays 10:00pm	February 16, 2011	May 25, 2011	2011	No. 39	10.57

== Reception ==
On Rotten Tomatoes, the series has an aggregate score of 42% based on 11 positive and 15 negative critic reviews. The website's consensus reads: "With plotlines that are both ludicrous and predictable, Criminal Minds: Suspect Behavior falls victim to audience overfamiliarity."
