= Neal Jones =

American actor (born 1960)

- Born: Neal Jones; January 2, 1960 (age 66); Wichita, Kansas, United States
- Occupation: Actor
- Years active: 1983–2010
- Spouse: Jamie

Neal Jones (born January 2, 1960) is an American stage, film, and television actor. He is best known for his role as Billy Kostecki in Dirty Dancing.

== Early life and education ==
Neal Jones was born on January 2, 1960, in Wichita, Kansas. Jones attended the Webster University Conservatory of Theatre Arts in St. Louis, Missouri.

== Career ==
After attending the Webster University Conservatory of Theatre Arts in St. Louis, Jones moved to New York and began his professional career in Nicol Williamson's production of Macbeth at the Circle in the Square. This was followed by The Corn Is Green at the Lunt-Fontanne Theatre and the Tony Award-winning, Big River, at the Eugene O'Neill Theatre. He went on to appear in numerous New York stage productions, including Mike Leigh's Ecstasy and Tom Dulack's Diminished Capacity at The New Group, Kenneth Branagh's Public Enemy at the Irish Arts Center, and The Great Lakes Theater Festival’s world premiere of Dylan Thomas's A Child's Christmas in Wales in Cleveland, Ohio, directed by Clifford Williams. As a director he staged the world premiere of Celtic Tiger (Me Arse) by Don Creedon, and the New York premiere of Joseph O'Connor's Red Roses and Petrol, both at the Irish Arts Center in New York, where he has also served as Artistic Director. He is a member of the Actors Studio.

His first film appearance was in Dirty Dancing, followed by more than 25 films, including Taylor Hackford's The Devil's Advocate (one of four films in which he appears with Al Pacino), In America and G.I. Jane. He was nominated for Best Supporting Actor at the 2008 Malibu International Film Festival for his role in the independent film Mona.

Jones also has appeared in several television series, including The Sopranos, Sex and the City, Law & Order, and Criminal Minds (as Karl Arnold aka The Fox). He appeared in seven episodes of the FX series Rescue Me as Peter Reilly, the gay son of Chief Jerry Reilly. Jones's work in Generation Kill was singled out for praise by reviewers Matthew Gilbert of The Boston Globe and Alan Sepinwall of the Star-Ledger.

== Filmography ==
=== Film ===
Year	Title	Role	Notes
1987	Dirty Dancing	Billy Kostecki	
1992	Glengarry Glen Ross	Man in Donut Shop	
1993	Romeo Is Bleeding	Clerk	
1996	Looking for Richard	Messenger	
1996	Ratchet	Sam Leary	
1997	Silent Prey	Kevin O'Neill	a.k.a. Silent Predator
1997	Sax and Violins		
1997	G.I. Jane	Duty Officer	
1997	The Devil's Advocate	Larry - Florida Reporter	
1998	Day at the Beach	Chuck Hanson	
1998	Come To	Biker 1	short film
1998	The Siege	NYPD Representative	
2000	Chinese Coffee	Eteocles/Actor in play	
2001	Queenie in Love	Doctor	
2001	Way Off Broadway	Mr. Scott	
2002	Bridget	Hawks Anwalt	
2002	Changing Lanes	Newsroom Writer	
2002	In America	Immigration Officer #1	
2003	Beautiful Kid	direct-to-video release	
2004	Zombie Honeymoon	Officer Carp	
2005	Game 6	Yessiree Bob	
2006	The House Is Burning	Sheriff	
2008	Mona	John	Nominated—2008 Malibu International Film Festival, Best Supporting Actor
2009	Carbone's Birthday	Pachenko	short film
2010	Heterosexuals	Barry	

=== Television ===
Year	Series	Episode(s)	Role
1989	Monsters	"Taps"	Gary Gregory
1991	Law & Order	"Misconception"	Ray
1995	Law & Order	"Privileged"	Bill D.
1998	Law & Order	"Bad Girl"	Mr. Flynn
1999	Sex and the City	"The Awful Truth"	Richard
2000	Third Watch	"Demolition Derby"	Brian
2001	The Sopranos	"Mr. Ruggerio's Neighborhood"	Agent Tancredi
2004	The Jury	"The Honeymoon Suite"	Kevin Sykes
2004	Rescue Me	"Kansas", "Orphans"	Peter Reilly
2005	Rescue Me	"Sensitivity", "Reunion", "Shame", "Believe", "Brains"	Peter Reilly
2005	Criminal Minds	"The Fox"	Karl Arnold a.k.a. The Fox
2006	Law & Order: Criminal Intent	"Maltese Cross", "Weeping Willow"	Chief of Detectives Bradshaw
2007	Law & Order: Criminal Intent	"Flipped"	Chief of Detectives Bradshaw
2007	Crossing Jordan	"Seven Feet Under"	Russell Berman
2008	Generation Kill	Seven episodes—complete series	Sgt. Maj. John Sixta
2009	Law & Order	"Take-out"	Alex Boone
2009	Criminal Minds	"Outfoxed"	Karl Arnold a.k.a. The Fox
