= A. J. Cook =

Canadian actress (born 1978)

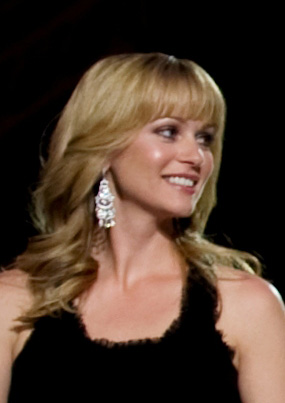
- Cook in 2010
- Born: Andrea Joy Cook; July 22, 1978 (age 48); Oshawa, Ontario, Canada
- Occupation: Actress
- Years active: 1997–present
- Spouse: Nathan Andersen (m. 2001)
- Children: 2

Andrea Joy Cook (born July 22, 1978) is a Canadian actress. She is best known for her role as Supervisory Special Agent Jennifer "JJ" Jareau on the CBS crime drama Criminal Minds (2005–2020, 2022–present). Cook has also appeared in The Virgin Suicides (1999), Higher Ground (2000), Ripper (2001), Out Cold (2001), Final Destination 2 (2003), and Tru Calling (2003–2004).

== Early life ==
Cook was born in Oshawa, Ontario. She spent most of her early life in nearby Whitby, where she attended Anderson Collegiate Vocational Institute. She has three siblings: Nathan, Paul, and Angela.

Cook was declared legally blind in the second grade because of severe astigmatism, but wore contacts and thick "Coke bottle" glasses to correct her vision. Talking about her childhood, Cook recalled how other kids were "cruel" and that she "really couldn't see" and "everything looked like a smear of colour with no shapes". She also said that at the time of her diagnosis, she was not doing well in school. At first, people thought she had a learning disability because she could not read. In reality, she could not see the board, which affected her ability to recognize letters and know the sounds they made. In 2007, a surgical lens implant corrected the impairment.

A dancer from age four, Cook began taking jazz, tap and ballet lessons. She said that dance kept her engaged growing up as she did not have to recite or read anything. She danced competitively for many years, before deciding at the age of 16 that she wanted to try acting. Cook also taught dance when she was younger and has stated that if she had not become an actress, she would most likely have set up a small dance studio. In an interview, she said that she still tap dances.

== Career ==
Cook's first job was in a McDonald's commercial in 1997. She graduated to series work with a guest role on the television series Goosebumps and parts in two television movies, In His Father's Shoes and Elvis Meets Nixon. Cook launched her feature film career as one of five suicidal Lisbon sisters in 1999's The Virgin Suicides. Also that year, she took a starring role in the TV series Higher Ground, in which Cook played Shelby Merrick, an adolescent girl dealing with abuse and heartache at a wilderness school for struggling teens. Higher Ground lasted one season, ending with a romance between Shelby and Hayden Christensen's character Scott.

After Higher Ground, Cook appeared in the 2000 TV movie The Spiral Staircase (alongside Higher Ground alum Kandyse McClure), and then captured leading roles in several films, including Out Cold (as Jason London's love interest), Ripper, I'm Reed Fish, and Final Destination 2. In 2003, Cook guest starred in Dead Like Me. She was also in Season One of Tru Calling as Lindsay Walker.

Beginning in September 2005, she starred as Jennifer "J.J." Jareau in the CBS drama Criminal Minds. On June 14, 2010, it was announced that her contract option would not be picked up for season six as a series regular reportedly due to budget cuts on the show, but she returned for two episodes to wrap up her character's storyline due to thousands of letters and petitions written to the show's producers. She also returned for one episode for the departure of Paget Brewster from the series. Former executive producer of ''Criminal Minds'', Ed Bernero, later claimed that CBS executives called him one day and asked him to get rid of Cook and Brewster. Brewster also mentioned in a separate interview that someone from CBS called Bernero and said they wanted "new women" which led to their firing. She said that it was not due to budget cuts as their replacement was paid twice what they were paid.

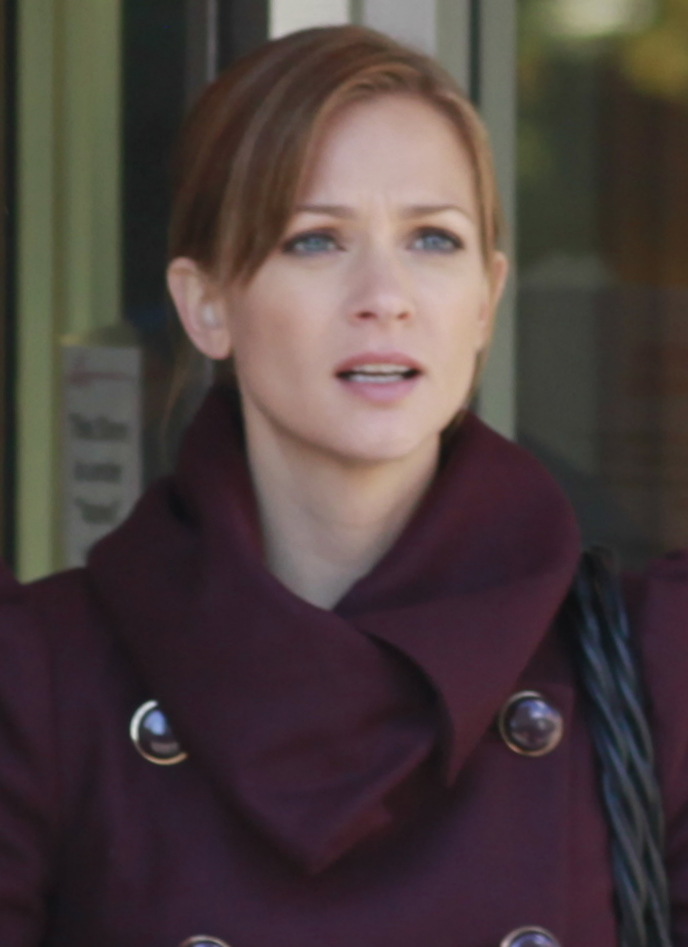
Cook in 2010

In April 2011, it was reported that Cook had signed to reappear for two more seasons of the show. In 2013, Cook and her Criminal Minds co-star Kirsten Vangsness managed to negotiate salary raises but not parity after years of being paid less than half the salary of fellow co-stars Matthew Gray Gubler and Shemar Moore. In 2017, both women held out on signing new contracts as they sought pay parity with Gubler. They eventually succeeded and closed new deals to return. Cook would continue to star in the series until it ended in 2020 after 15 seasons. After the show wrapped, Cook decided to take a break from acting and in 2022, she guest-starred on the show 9-1-1. It was also announced that she would be returning for the Criminal Minds revival.

== Other ventures ==
In 2013, it was announced she was hired as a spokeswoman for Proactiv. She appeared in the January/February 2014 issue of Maxim magazine. She was ranked at 88 on the Maxim Hot 100 2014 list. She was the grand marshal for the STP 500 at Martinsville Speedway in Martinsville, Virginia on April 3, 2016.

== Personal life ==
Cook was raised in the Church of Jesus Christ of Latter-day Saints (LDS Church), although she is no longer a practicing member. She also did not limit her acting solely to roles reflecting LDS Church beliefs. On August 3, 2001, she married her long-time boyfriend, Nathan Andersen. The two met in a film class at Utah Valley University, and she later moved to Salt Lake City, Utah, to be with him. They reside in Los Angeles, California, with their two sons.

In September 2008, their first son, Mekhai Allan, was born. He appeared as Henry LaMontagne throughout the Criminal Minds series. The couple's second son, Phoenix Sky, was born in July 2015. Cook and her husband named him Phoenix because they were told that they couldn't have any more children but Phoenix was a surprise and "just rose up". He also appeared in Criminal Minds, as Jareau's second son, Michael.

== Filmography ==
=== Film ===
Year	Title	Role	Notes
1997	Laserhawk	Pretty Girl #1	
1999	The Virgin Suicides	Mary Lisbon	
1999	Teen Sorcery	Dawn	Direct-to-video
2001	Ripper	Molly Keller	
2001	Wishmaster 3: Beyond the Gates of Hell	Diana Collins	Direct-to-video
2001	Out Cold	Jenny	
2002	The House Next Door	Lori Peterson	
2003	Final Destination 2	Kimberly Corman	
2006	I'm Reed Fish	Theresa	
2007	Night Skies	Lilly	
2008	Misconceptions	Miranda Bliss	
2010	Mother's Day	Vicky Rice	
2012	Least Among Saints	Cheryl	
2013	Wer	Kate Moore	
2019	Back Fork	Nida	

=== Television ===
Year	Title	Role	Notes
1997	Elvis Meets Nixon	Hippie chick	TV film
1997	In His Father's Shoes	Lisa	TV film
1997	Goosebumps	Kim	Episode: "Don't Wake Mummy"
1997	Psi Factor	Jill Starling	Episode: "Second Sight/Chocolate Soldier"
1998	Psi Factor	Lee Mason	Episode: "Hell Week"
1999	Blue Moon	Alison	TV film
2000	The Spiral Staircase	Local Girl	TV film
2000	Higher Ground	Shelby Merrick	Main role
2000	First Wave	Lindsay Tilden	Episode: "The Flight of Francis Jeffries"
2003	Dead Like Me	Charlotte	Episode: "Sunday Mornings"
2003	Tru Calling	Lindsay Walker	Main role (season 1); 20 episodes
2005	Bloodsuckers	Fiona	TV film
2005–2020; 2022–present	Criminal Minds	Jennifer Jareau	Main role (seasons 1–6, 7–present); Special guest star (season 6)
2006	Vanished	Hope	TV film
2011	Law & Order: Special Victims Unit	Dr. Debbie Shields	Episode: "Mask"
2011	Bringing Ashley Home	Libba	TV film
2022	9-1-1	Kira	Episode: "Boston"

=== Director ===
Year	Title	Episode
2019	Criminal Minds	Season 14 Episode 13: "Chameleon"
2023	Criminal Minds	Season 16 Episode 8: "Forget Me Knots"
2024	Criminal Minds	Season 17 Episode 2: “Contagion”
2025	Criminal Minds	Season 18 Episode 7: "...All The Devils Are Here"
