= Ed Bernero =

American screenwriter

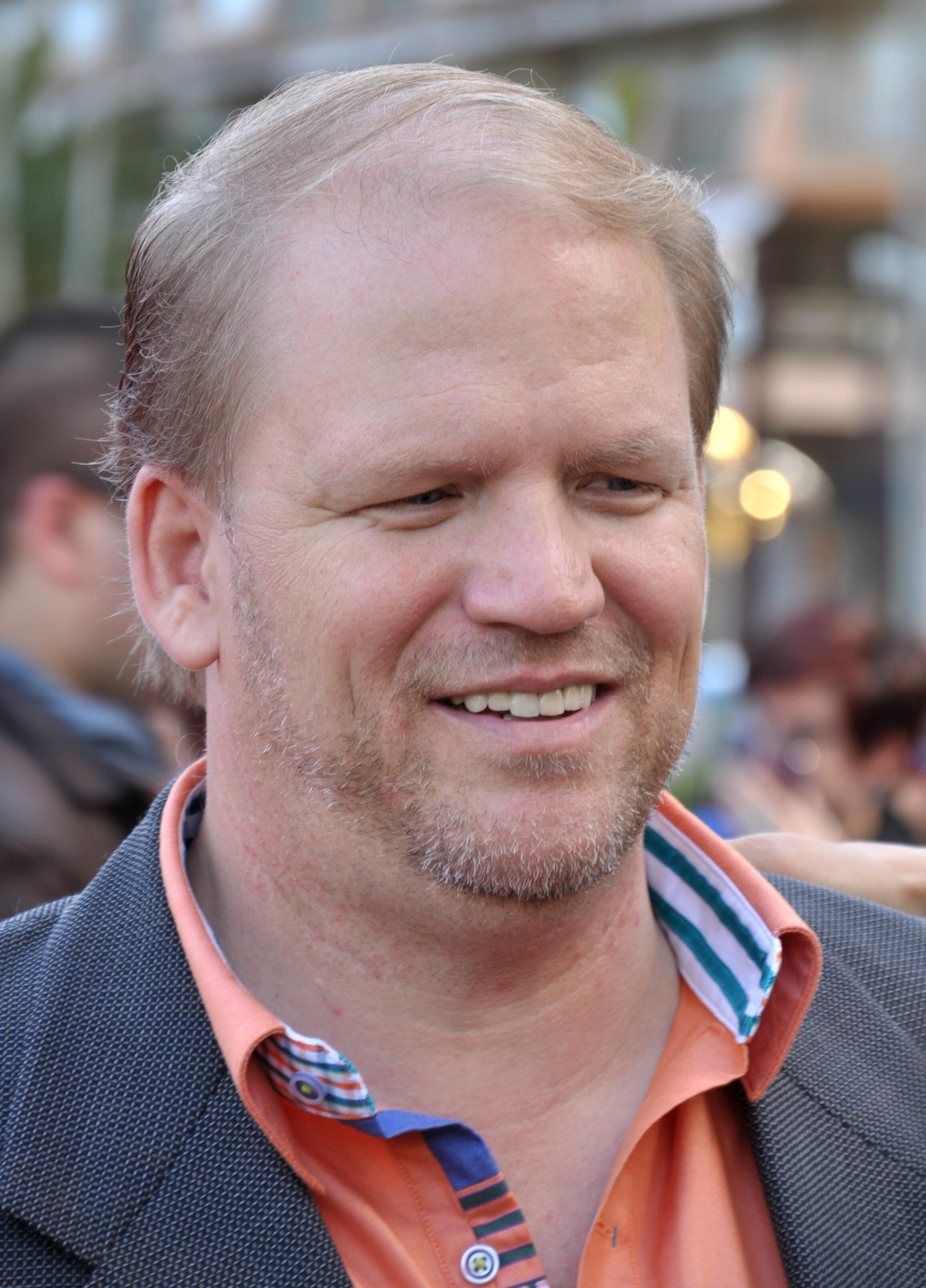
- Bernero in 2013
- Born: August 29, 1962 (age 63); Chicago, Illinois, U.S.
- Occupations: Television writer, producer, and director
- Years active: 1997—present
- Known for: Criminal Minds, Third Watch

Edward Allen Bernero (born August 29, 1962) is an American television writer, producer, and director. He co-created the series Third Watch and has worked as an executive producer on Criminal Minds. He co-created the spin-off Criminal Minds: Suspect Behavior, which premiered on February 16, 2011, and was canceled on May 25, 2011, due to low ratings.

== Biography ==
Before his work in television, he worked as a police officer in Chicago.

He began his television career as a freelance writer for the CBS police drama Brooklyn South in 1997. The series was created by Steven Bochco, William M. Finkelstein, David Milch, and retired police officer Bill Clark. Bochco, Finkelstein and Milch served as executive producers for the series along with Michael S. Chernuchin. The show focused on a single precinct of patrol officers in New York. Bernero wrote the teleplay for the episode "Why Can't Even a Couple of Us Get Along?" from a story by Bochco & Milch. Bernero & Chernuchin co-wrote the teleplay for the episode "A Reverend Runs Through It" from a story by Clark & Bochco. Bernero and Chernuchin co-wrote the episode "Exposing Johnson". Bernero and Scott A. Williams co-wrote the teleplay for the episode "Fisticuffs" from a story by William M. Finkelstein, Bill Clark & David Milch. The series was canceled after completing a 22-episode season. Bernero contributed to four episodes as a writer.

He created the series Third Watch (with John Wells) based on his experiences as a police officer and served as a producer, writer, and director for the show. He eventually became the show runner and was the series' most prolific writer throughout its six seasons, contributing to thirty-seven episodes in total. He made his directing début on the series and became a regular director in later seasons helming a total of four episodes.

He served as a co-producer on the pilot episode (and received a story credit as co-creator). He remained a co-producer for the start of the first season and continued to write episodes. He wrote six first-season episodes including the pilot making him the season's most prolific writer. The others were "Anywhere But Here", "Responsible Parties", "Alone in a Crowd", "Officer Involved", and "Just Another Night at the Opera". He was promoted to producer mid-season.

He became a supervising producer for the second season of Third Watch in 2000. He remained the show's most prolific writer and wrote six episodes for the second season: "Four Days" (with John Ridley); "After Hours"; "A Hero's Rest"; "Duty"; "Unfinished Business"; and "Exposing Faith" (with Whitney Boole Williams). He was nominated for a Humanitas Prize in 2001 for his work on the episode "After Hours". He was promoted to co-executive producer in the mid-season break.

Bernero was promoted again to executive producer for the show's third season in late 2001. The season was delayed because of the destruction of the World Trade Center on September 11. Bernero contributed to nine third-season episodes as a writer. He co-wrote the season première "In Their Own Words" with Boole Williams. The episode was a tribute to emergency services actions on September 11, and in particular, the cast and crew members of the show who were drawn from the emergency services. He also wrote "After Time" (with Wells), "The Relay" (with Scott Williams), "Childhood Memories", "Old Dogs, New Tricks", "Superheroes: Part 1" (with Jorge Zamacona), "Superheroes: Part 2", "Unleashed", and the season finale "Blackout".

Bernero took over from Wells as the series showrunner for the fourth season in 2002. He remained an executive producer and a regular writer. He contributed to six episodes for the fourth season: "Lights Up" which continued directly on from season 3's finale "Black Out"; "Judgement Day: Part II"; "Ladies' Day"; "Collateral Damage: Part I"; "Last Call" (his second collaboration with Scott Williams); and "The Price of Nobility" (with Brooke Kennedy).

He remained the series showrunner and an executive producer for the fifth season in 2003. He wrote five episodes and directed two episodes for the season. He made his television directing début with his teleplay "A Call For Help" and also wrote and directed the fifth-season finale "Monsters". He also wrote the episodes "The Truth and Other Lies", "The Spirit", and "Family Ties: Part II". He continued in the same capacity for the sixth and final season in 2004, writing four episodes (the sixth season's premiere "More Monsters", "The Hunter, Hunted", "The Greatest Detective", and "In the Family Way") and directing "The Other "L" Word", as well as writing and directing the series finale, "Goodbye to Camelot".

Following the conclusion of Third Watch, Bernero became an executive producer for the CBS drama series Criminal Minds in 2005. He continued to write and direct episodes for his new project. He wrote the first-season episode "The Popular Kids" and the first-season finale "The Fisher King: Part 1". He returned for the second series and wrote the season première "The Fisher King: Part 2". He also wrote the second-season episodes "Profiler, Profiled" and "The Big Game" and directed the season finale "No Way Out, Part II: The Evilution of Frank". He directed the third-season episode "In Birth and Death", wrote and directed the episode "True Night" and wrote the episode "Damaged". He directed the fourth season première "Mayhem", wrote the episode "Masterpiece" and directed the episode "Demonology". He directed the fifth-season episode "100", wrote the eighteenth episode "The Fight", which set the stage for the spin-off Criminal Minds: Suspect Behavior and the twentieth episode "A Thousand Words" and directed the season finale "Our Darkest Hour". He wrote and directed the sixth-season premiere "The Longest Night" and wrote the tenth episode "What Happens At Home". At the same time, he directed the series finale "Death by a Thousand Cuts" for the spin-off Criminal Minds: Suspect Behavior, which ended with a cliffhanger.

Bernero was also an executive producer for the proposed CBS project Washington Field. The series was created by Jim Clemente and Tim Clemente who were to act as head writers. The show was about the National Capital Response Squad, a unit of the FBI composed of elite experts in different areas who travel around the world responding to events that concern American interest, and starred Third Watch alumnus Eddie Cibrian along with Cole Hauser, Gina Torres, Teri Polo, & Matthew Yang King. The pilot was shown as a TV film in November 2009.

Bernero wrote and produced the first two of the three seasons of the international television show, Crossing Lines, which debuted in 2013. The show, a law enforcement procedural, involved a team of law enforcement officers and detectives from different countries who work as a team for the International Criminal Court in The Hague. The team fights crimes that have cross-border impacts, i.e. that affect more than one European country. The cast, headed by American actors William Fichtner and Donald Sutherland, included actors from Italy, France, Ireland, and Germany. The show, although based in Prague, was filmed in a variety of European locales. When Bernero departed at the end of season two, most of the series' regular characters had been written out of the show or simply did not return.

In December 2024, Bernero was hired to write and showrun a Nova television series for the Marvel Cinematic Universe, featuring the character Richard Rider / Nova.
