= Family Ties (disambiguation) =

Family Ties is a 1980s American TV sitcom.

Family Ties may also refer to:

== Arts, entertainment and media ==
=== Music ===
- Family Ties (Daddy X album), 2006
- Family Ties (Fat Joe and Dre album), 2018
- Family Ties, by Chillinit, 2021
- "Family Ties" (song), by Baby Keem and Kendrick Lamar, 2021
- "Family Ties", by Bastille from Give Me the Future + Dreams of the Past, 2022

=== Films ===
- Family Ties (2006 film), 2006 South Korean film
- Family Ties (2018 film), 2018 Canadian film

=== Novels ===
- Family Ties (novel), 2010 novel by Danielle Steel
- Family Ties (short story collection), 1960 book by Clarice Lispector

=== Television series ===
- Family Ties (Singaporean TV series), 2023 Singaporean television series

=== Television episodes ===
- "Family Ties" (Arrested Development)
- "Family Ties" (Bakugan Battle Brawlers: New Vestroia)
- "Family Ties" (The Bill)
- "Family Ties" (Blue Bloods)
- "Family Ties" (Cold Squad)
- "Family Ties" (Crossing Jordan)
- "Family Ties" (Dangerous Minds)
- "Family Ties" (Farscape)
- "Family Ties" (NYPD Blue)
- "The Family Ties", The O.C.
- "Family Ties" (Parental Guidance)
- "Family Ties" (Renegade)
- "Family Ties" (Stargate SG-1)
- "Family Ties" (Stormworld)
- "Family Ties: Part I" (Third Watch)
- "Family Ties: Part II" (Third Watch)
- "Family Ties" (The Upper Hand)
- "Family Ties" (The Vampire Diaries)
- "Family Ties" (Whistler)
- "Family Ties" (X-Men)

== Other uses ==
- X-wing Rogue Squadron: Family Ties, 1998 story arc in the comics series X-wing: Rogue Squadron

== See also ==
- Family — Ties of Blood, a 2006 Hindi film
- Kinship (disambiguation)
