= Kinsman =

A kinsman is a male relative (see kinship).

The term kinsman (or plural kinsmen) may also refer to:

== Places in the United States ==
- Kinsman, Illinois
- Kinsman, Ohio
- Kinsman Township, Trumbull County, Ohio
- Kinsman Mountain, in the White Mountains of New Hampshire
- Kinsman Notch, a mountain pass in New Hampshire

== People ==
- Brent Kinsman (born 1997), American child actor
- Frederick Joseph Kinsman (1868–1944), American clergyman
- Gary Kinsman (born 1955), Canadian sociologist
- Jeremy Kinsman (born 1942), Canadian diplomat
- Kay Kinsman (1909–1998), Canadian artist and writer
- Shane Kinsman (born 1997), American child actor
- Thomas James Kinsman (1945–2017), U.S. Army soldier awarded the Medal of Honor
- Paul Kinsman (1931–2014), Canadian physician and politician

== Organizations ==
- Kin Canada, a Canadian non-profit service organization also known as Kinsmen and Kinette Clubs
- Kinsmen Field House, a multi-purpose sport and recreation facility

== Vessels ==
- USS Colonel Kinsman (1862), a gunboat captured by the Union Army during the American Civil War

== Fiction ==
- The Kinsman, a 1919 British silent comedy film
- Chet Kinsman, protagonist in a series of books by Ben Bova, including the novels "Kinsman" and "The Kinsman Saga"

== Music ==
- Kinsmen (album), a 2008 jazz album with saxophonist Rudresh Mahanthappa

== See also ==
- Kingsman (disambiguation)
- King's Men (disambiguation)
