= Kingman =

Kingman may refer to one of the following:

== Places ==
- Kingman Reef in the northern Pacific Ocean, United States

In the United States:

- Kingman, Arizona
- Kingman, Indiana
- Kingman, Kansas
- Kingman, Maine
- Kingman, Ohio
- Kingman County, Kansas
- Kingman Museum, natural history museum and planetarium in Battle Creek, Michigan
- Kingman Place Historic District, listed on the National Register of Historic Places in Polk County, Iowa
- Kingman Township, Renville County, Minnesota
- Kingman Hall, a house in the Berkeley Student Cooperative in Berkeley, California

== People ==
=== Real people ===
- Kingman Brewster Jr. (1919–1988), American former President of Yale University and diplomat
- Brian Kingman, a former Major League Baseball pitcher
- Dave Kingman, a former Major League Baseball player
- Dong Kingman, an American artist
- Eduardo Kingman, an Ecuadorian artist
- Harry Kingman, a former Major League Baseball player
- John Kingman, a British mathematician
- Samuel Austin Kingman (1818–1904), Justice of the Kansas Supreme Court

== Sports ==
- Kingman (horse), winner of the 1891 Kentucky Derby
- Kingman (British horse), winner of the 2014 Irish 2000 Guineas

== Transportation ==
- Kingman station, a train station in Arizona

== Mathematics ==
- Kingman's law of congestion - approximation for the mean waiting time in a M/G/k queue.
- Kingman's formula - approximation for the mean waiting time in a G/G/1 queue
- Kingman's law - special case of the law governing a Poisson-Dirichlet distribution

== See also ==
- King's Men (disambiguation)
- Kingsman (disambiguation)
- Kingman's formula
