= Kinship (disambiguation) =

Kinship is a relationship between any entities that share a genealogical origin, through either biological, cultural, or historical descent.

Kinship may also refer to:

- Kinship (number theory), an unsolved problem in mathematics
- Kinship (TV series), a Singaporean Chinese drama
- Bloodline (1963 film), a/k/a Kinship, a Korean drama film directed by Kim Soo-yong
- Kinship (2019 film), a Canadian short drama film directed by Jorge Camarotti

== See also ==
- Kinsman (disambiguation)
