= Janine Sherman Barrois =

Television producer and writer

- Occupations: Television producer; showrunner; television writer
- Years active: 1994—present

Janine Sherman Barrois is an American television writer, producer, and showrunner. She is known for her work on ER, Third Watch and Criminal Minds. From 2017 to 2022, she executive produced crime comedy-drama Claws on TNT. She also produced Netflix miniseries Self Made: Inspired by the Life of Madam C.J. Walker, the Oprah Winfrey Network prime time soap opera, The Kings of Napa, and Apple TV+ thriller The Big Cigar. She owned production banner, Folding Chair Prods., which she launched at Warner Bros. Television Group in 2015.

== Career ==
Sherman Barrois began her career as an assistant on the 1994 television series, South Central and later in films The Glass Shield (1994) and Major Payne (1995). Her first producer credit was in the 1996 film Bulletproof. From 1997 to 1998, Barrois worked as a writer on The Jamie Foxx Show. She wrote three episodes across the second and third seasons. She went on to become a co-producer of The PJs and then was hired as an executive story editor for Third Watch by John Wells.

When Third Watch ended she became a co-executive producer for another Wells series, ER. She joined the crew of ER in the twelfth season. She was nominated for a Humanitas Prize in the 60 minutes category and an Image Award for Outstanding Writing in a Drama Series for her work on the twelfth season ER episode "Darfur" in 2007. She was nominated for a second Image Award for writing in 2008 for her work on the thirteenth season ER episode "Breach of Trust". She was again nominated for her season 15 work for the episode entitled "Parental Guidance".

In 2010, she joined the CBS crime series, Criminal Minds at the beginning of season six and left at the end of season ten. In 2015, she signed a multi-year overall deal at Warner Bros. Television.

== Filmography ==
=== Writer ===
Year	Show	Episode	Notes
1997	The Jamie Foxx Show	"One Flew Over the County's Nest"	Season 2, episode 4
1998	The Jamie Foxx Show	"Papa Don't Preach"	Season 2, episode 14
1998	The Jamie Foxx Show	"Guess Who's Not Coming to Dinner?"	Season 3, episode 6
2000	Third Watch	"Kim's Hope Chest"	Season 2, episode 5
2001	Third Watch	"Honor"	Season 2, episode 18
2002	Third Watch	"Falling"	Season 3, episode 17
2002	Third Watch	"To Protect..."	Season 4, episode 3
2002	Third Watch	"Crime and Punishment: Part 1"	Season 4, episode 9
2003	Third Watch	"10-13"	Season 4, episode 16
2003	Third Watch	"In Confidence"	Season 4, episode 20
2003	Third Watch	"Lockdown"	Season 5, episode 3
2003	Third Watch	"Payback"	Season 5, episode 7
2004	Third Watch	"Sleeping Dogs Lie"	Season 5, episode 13
2004	Third Watch	"Higher Calling"	Season 5, episode 21
2004	Third Watch	"Alone Again, Naturally"	Season 6, episode 2
2004	Third Watch	"The Hunter, Hunted"	Season 6, episode 5
2004	Third Watch	"Broken"	Season 6, episode 8
2005	Third Watch	"Too Little, Too Late"	Season 6, episode 18
2005	ER	"Wake Up"	Season 12, episode 5
2005	ER	"All About Christmas Eve"	Season 12, episode 10
2006	ER	"Darfur"	Season 12, episode 15
2006	ER	"Graduation Day"	Season 13, episode 2
2006	ER	"Heart of the Matter"	Season 13, episode 6
2007	ER	"Breach of Trust"	Season 13, episode 12
2007	ER	"Dying Is Easy..."	Season 13, episode 15
2007	ER	"Lights Out"	Season 13, episode 20
2007	ER	"Officer Down"	Season 14, episode 3
2008	ER	"Status Quo"	Season 14, episode 11
2008	ER	"Under Pressure"	Season 14, episode 17
2008	ER	"Parental Guidance"	Season 15, episode 4
2010	Criminal Minds	"Remembrance of Things Past"	Season 6, episode 3
2011	Criminal Minds	"The Thirteenth Step"	Season 6, episode 13
2011	Criminal Minds	"With Friends Like These"	Season 6, episode 19
2011	Criminal Minds	"Proof"	Season 7, episode 2
2011	Criminal Minds	"The Bittersweet Science"	Season 7, episode 10
2012	Criminal Minds	"I Love You, Tommy Brown"	Season 7, episode 17
2012	Criminal Minds	"The Pact"	Season 8, episode 2
2012	Criminal Minds	"The Lesson"	Season 8, episode 10
2013	Criminal Minds	"Restoration"	Season 8, episode 18
2013	Criminal Minds	"The Inspiration"	Season 9, episode 1
2013	Criminal Minds	"Strange Fruit"	Season 9, episode 9
2014	Criminal Minds	"The Edge of Winter"	Season 9, episode 19
2014	Criminal Minds	"Angels"	Season 9, episode 23
2014	Criminal Minds	"Burn"	Season 10, episode 2
2014	Criminal Minds	"Fate"	Season 10, episode 9
2015	Criminal Minds	"The Hunt"	Season 10, episode 23
2017	Claws	"Fallout"	Season 1, episode 4
2017	Claws	"Bats**t	Season 1, episode 5
2018	Claws	"Cracker Casserole"	Season 2, episode 2
2018	Claws	"Til Death"	Season 2, episode 9
2019	Claws	"Muscle & Flow"	Season 3, episode 2
2019	Claws	"Finna"	Season 3, episode 10
2020	Self Made: Inspired by the Life of Madam C.J. Walker	"Boot Straps"	Season 1, episode 2
2024	The Big Cigar		Upcoming miniseries
