= Criminal Minds season 7 =

Season of television series Criminal Minds

Criminal Minds
- Season 7
- Season 7 U.S. DVD cover
- Starring: Joe Mantegna; Paget Brewster; Shemar Moore; Matthew Gray Gubler; A. J. Cook; Kirsten Vangsness; Thomas Gibson
- No. of episodes: 24

Release
- Original network: CBS
- Original release: September 21, 2011 – May 16, 2012

Season chronology
- ← Previous; Season 6 Next → Season 8

The seventh season of Criminal Minds premiered on CBS in the United States on September 21, 2011. Both A. J. Cook and Paget Brewster were rehired by CBS to reprise their roles as Jennifer Jareau and Emily Prentiss. On February 15, 2012, Deadline Hollywood reported that Paget Brewster (Emily Prentiss) would leave the series, definitively, once season seven was over. All the other main actors on the show secured deals to return for the eighth season. The two-hour season finale, which took place on May 16, 2012, reveals Prentiss deciding to leave the BAU.

On March 14, 2012, CBS renewed Criminal Minds for an eighth season, which aired on September 26, 2012.

== Cast ==
=== Main ===
- Joe Mantegna as Supervisory Special Agent David Rossi (BAU Senior Agent)
- Paget Brewster as Supervisory Special Agent Emily Prentiss (BAU Agent)
- Shemar Moore as Supervisory Special Agent Derek Morgan (BAU Agent)
- Matthew Gray Gubler as Supervisory Special Agent Dr. Spencer Reid (BAU Agent)
- A. J. Cook as Supervisory Special Agent Jennifer "JJ" Jareau (BAU Agent)
- Kirsten Vangsness as Special Agent Penelope Garcia (BAU Technical Analyst & Co-Communications Liaison)
- Thomas Gibson as Supervisory Special Agent Aaron "Hotch" Hotchner (BAU Unit Chief & Co-Communications Liaison)

=== Recurring ===
- Bellamy Young as Beth Clemmons
- Jayne Atkinson as Supervisory Special Agent Erin Strauss (BAU Section Chief)
- Cade Owens as Jack Hotchner
- Nicholas Brendon as Kevin Lynch
- Josh Stewart as William "Will" LaMontagne Jr.
- Mekhai Andersen as Henry LaMontagne

== Guest stars ==
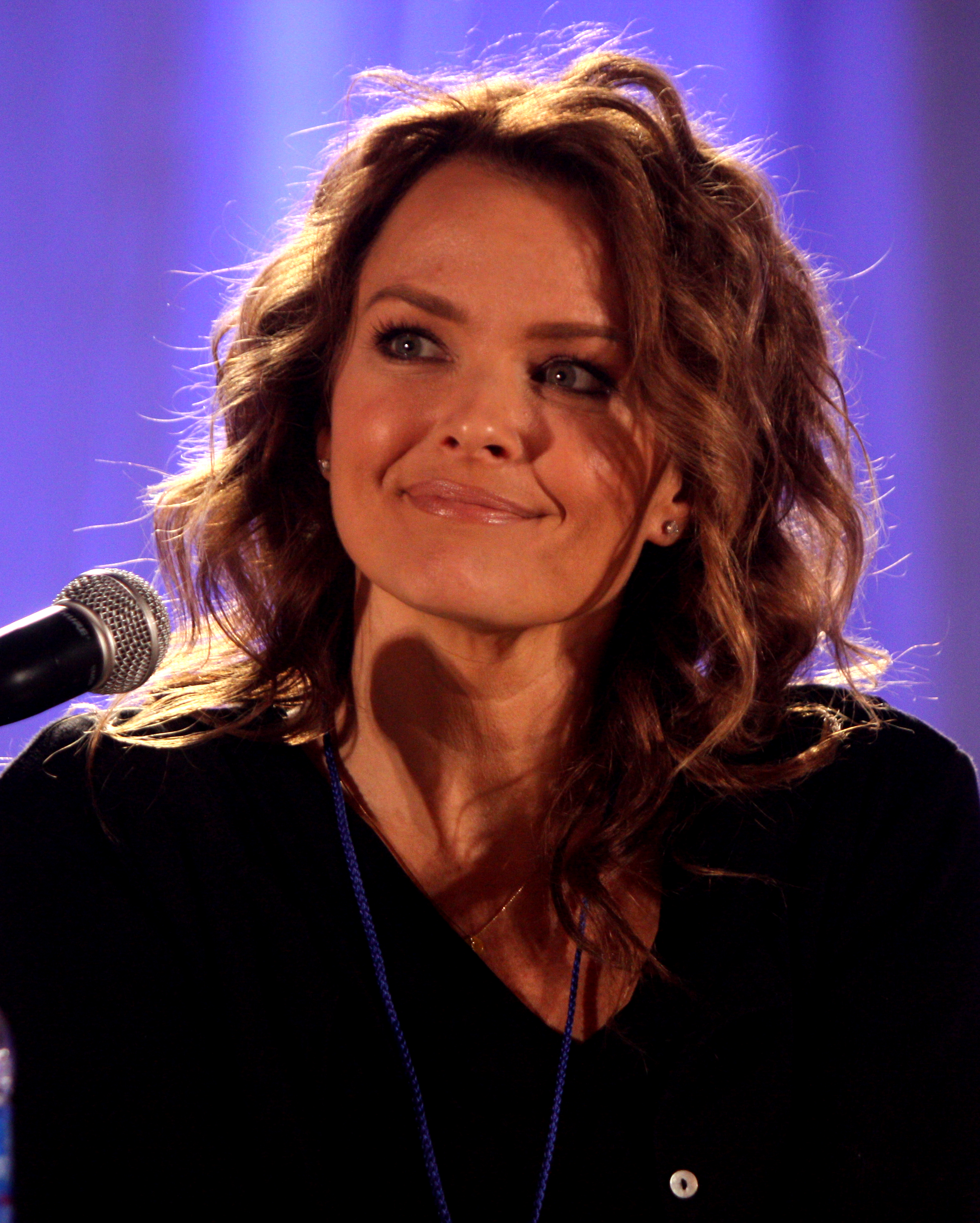
Saw star Dina Meyer appears in the episode "Unknown Subject" as Regina Lampert.

In the season premiere "It Takes a Village", Timothy V. Murphy reprises as Ian Doyle, and Robin Atkin Downes guest-starred as Lachlan McDermott, an international criminal who seeks vengeance against Doyle for murdering his brother Jimmy. In the episode "Proof", Andy Milder guest-starred as Cy Bradstone, a mentally challenged serial killer who removes his victims' five senses with sulfuric acid. Johanna Braddy guest-starred as Cy's niece, Tammy, and Tracy Middendorf guest-starred as Tammy's mother, Lyla, over whom Cy had a secret obsession. In the episode "Dorado Falls", Max Martini guest-starred as Luke Dolan, a former U.S. Navy Seal suffering from posttraumatic stress disorder and capgras syndrome who goes on a murderous rampage. Sarah Aldrich guest-starred as Luke's wife, Jenna.

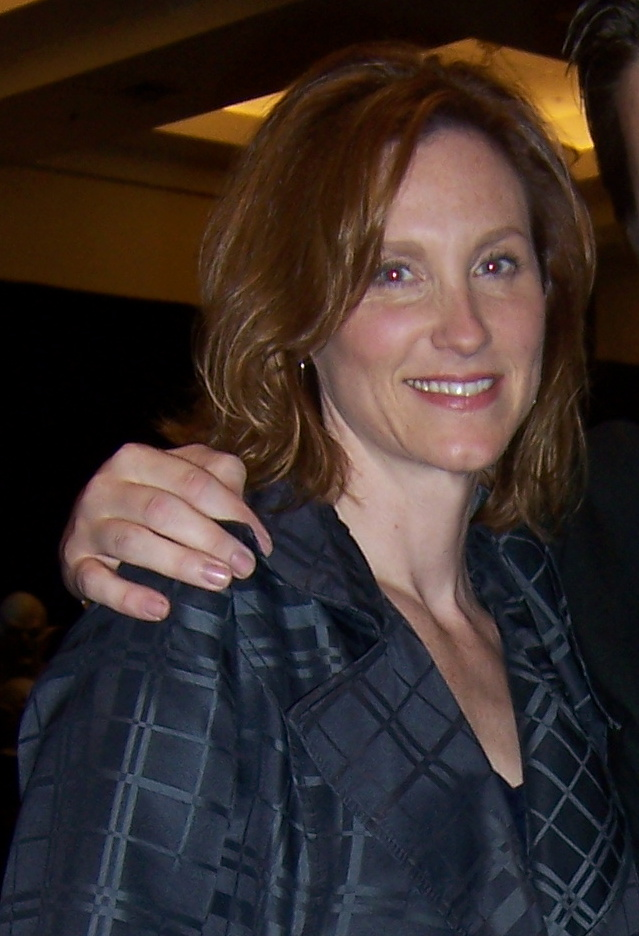
Judith Hoag appears in the episode "Unknown Subject" as Diana Mitchell.

In the episode "Painless", Eric Jungmann guest-starred as Robert Adams, a survivor of a high school shooting who copied the murders committed by Randy Slade. Julia Campbell guest-starred as Randy's mother, Martha Slade, and Aaron Hill guest-starred as Jerry Holtz, another survivor of the shooting who is murdered by Robert. In the episode "From Childhood's Hour", Isabella Hofmann guest-starred as Carolyn Baker, David Rossi's first wife who dies of amyotrophic lateral sclerosis. Heather Tom guest-starred as Connie Barton, a mother who is abducted by George Kelling. In the episode "There's No Place Like Home", Alex Weed guest-starred as Travis James, a serial killer who abducted male prostitutes.

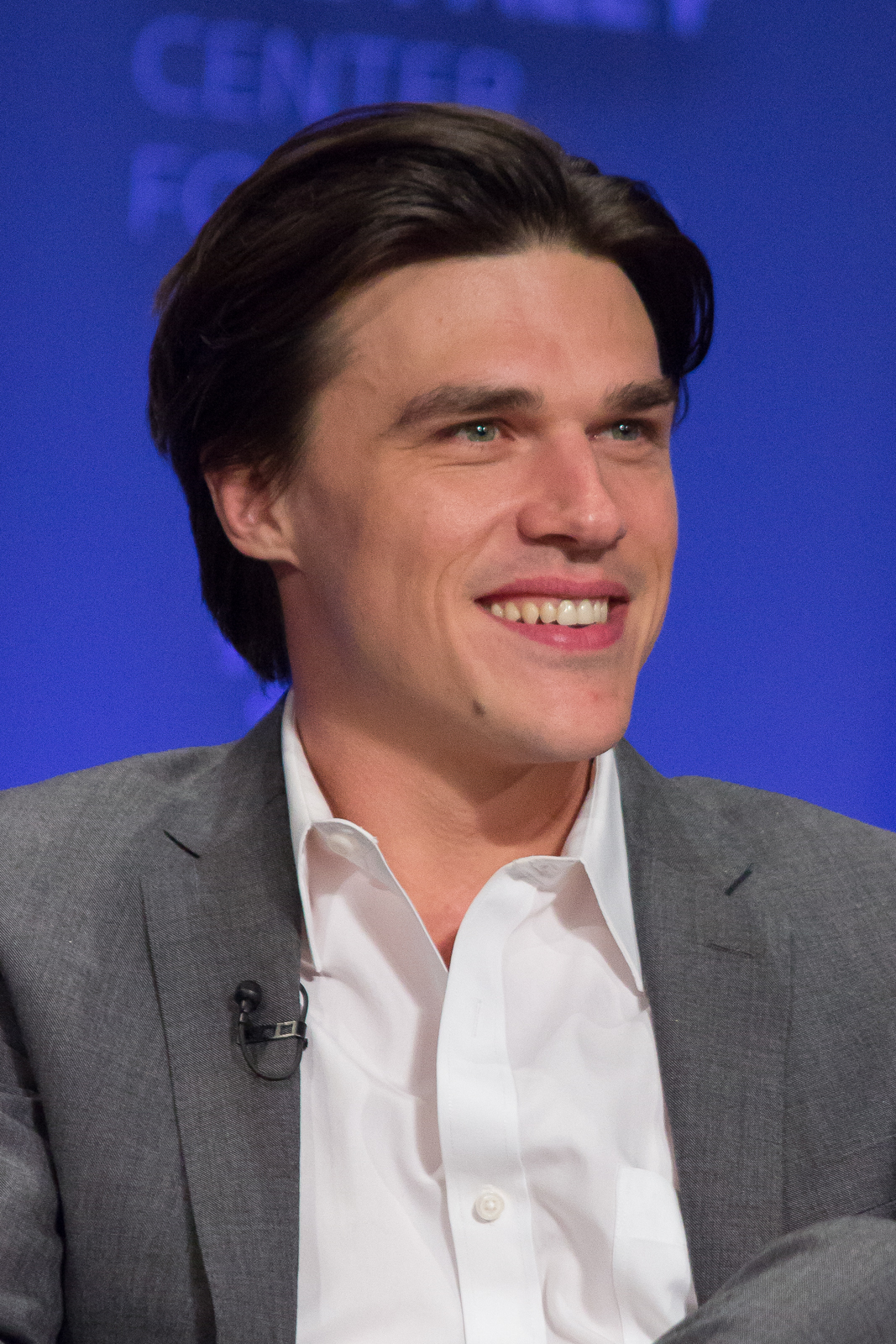
Finn Wittrock appears in the episode "True Genius" as Harvey Morell.

In the episode "Hope", Brigid Brannagh guest-starred as Monica Kingston, a mother whose daughter was abducted and murdered by Bill Rogers, played by Jack Coleman. In the episode "Self-Fulfilling Prophecy", René Auberjonois of Star Trek: Deep Space 9 fame guest-starred as Colonel Ronald Massey, the leader of the Somerville Military Academy and criminal accomplice of both his second in command and of a dead cadet's vengeful father. In the episode "The Bittersweet Science", Shawn Hatosy guest-starred as Jimmy Hall, a professional boxer and spree killer whose son dies of leukemia. David Mazouz who co-starred with Kieffer Sutherland in the TV show Touch plays young Ryan Hall. Charles S. Dutton guest-starred as Tony Cole, Jimmy's boxing trainer.

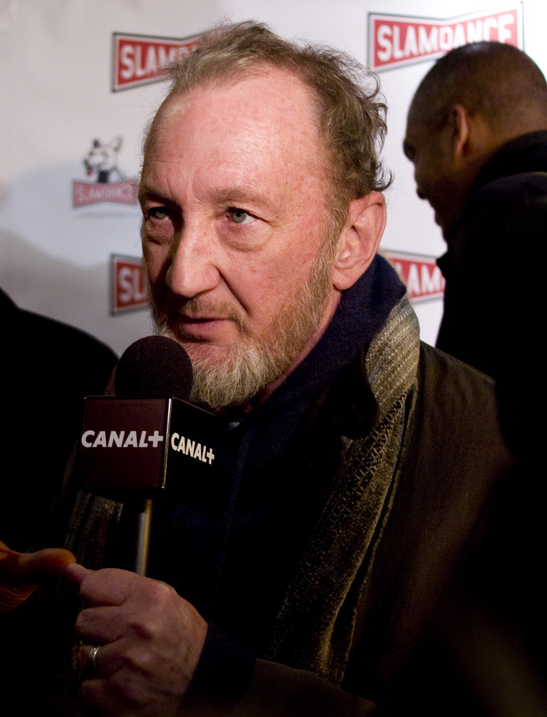
A Nightmare on Elm Street star Robert Englund appears in the episode "Heathridge Manor" as Det. Gassner.

In the episode "Unknown Subject", Jay Karnes guest-starred as Hamilton Bartholomew, aka "The Piano Man", a serial rapist who is assaulting the victims he previously raped. In the episode "Snake Eyes", Dean Cain guest-starred as Curtis Banks, a serial killer with a gambling problem. Vanessa Branch guest-starred as Curtis' wife, Teri. In the episode "Closing Time", Geoffrey Blake guest-starred as Michael Janeczko, a serial killer who targeted men who have been divorced, which reflected Michael's own background. Tyler Neitzel guest-starred as Michael's stepson, Hunter Wright. In the episode "A Thin Line", Paul Johansson guest-starred as Clark Preston, a mayoral candidate and criminal accomplice of hate crime serial killer Trevor Mills.

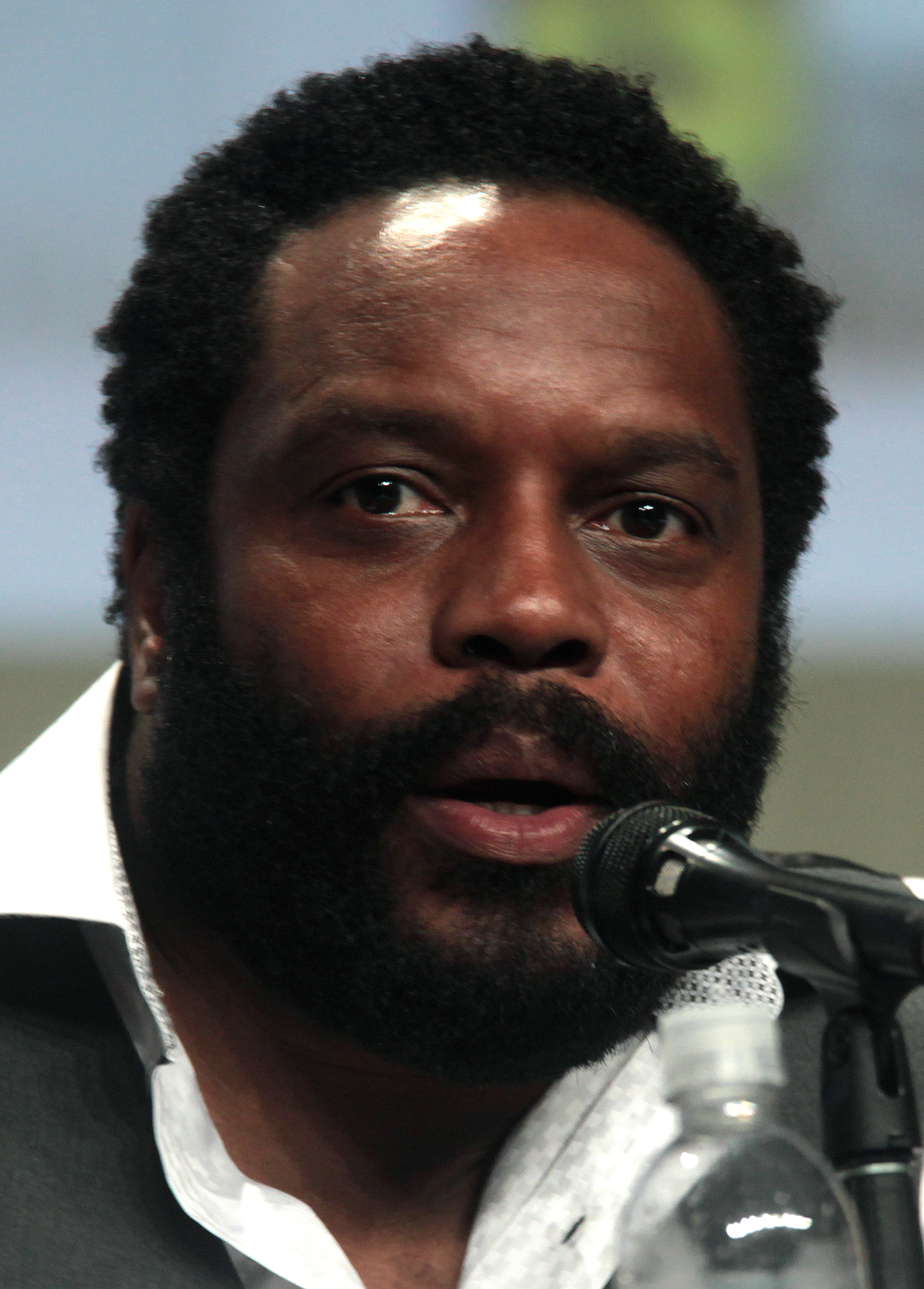
The Walking Dead star Chad Coleman appears in the episode "The Company" as Malcolm Ford.

In the episode "A Family Affair", Kathy Baker and William Russ guest-starred as Donald and Linda Collins, the parents of paraplegic serial killer Jeffrey Collins. In the episode "I Love You, Tommy Brown", Teri Polo guest-starred as Margaret Hollman, a mentally unstable high school teacher who fell in love with one of her students, Thomas Brown, with whom she had a son. In the episode "Foundation", Hedy Burress guest-starred as Samantha Allen, the daughter of pedophilic abductor J.B. Allen. In the episode "Heathridge Manor", Juliet Landau guest-starred as Catherine Heathridge, a textile heiress who suffered a psychotic reaction to a Shakespeare play that convinced her that the lead actresses were "The Devil's Wives", prompting her to murder them. Kyle Gallner and Madeleine Martin guest-starred as Catherine's children, James and Lara, who followed in her footsteps. Robert Englund appeared as Detective Gassner, who calls in the BAU for help.

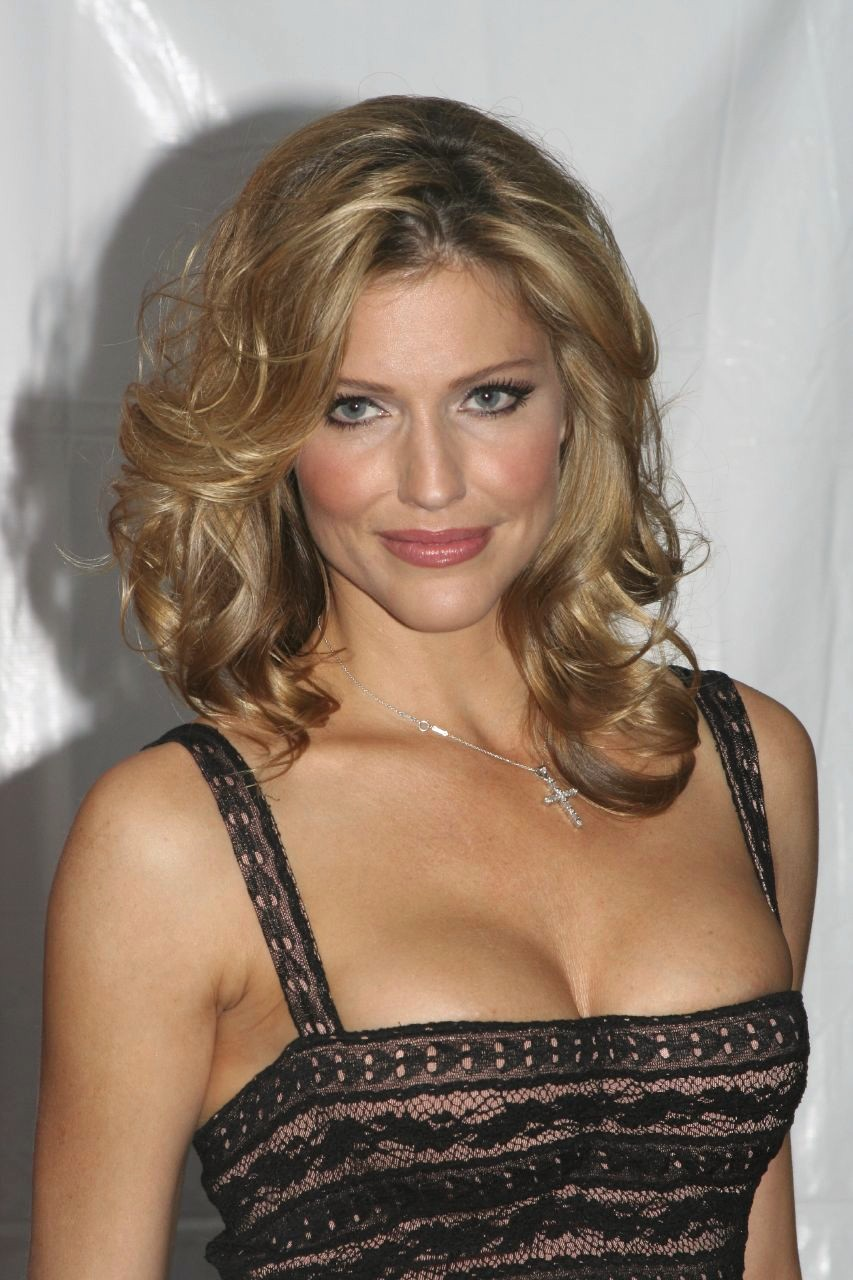
Tricia Helfer appears in the two-part season finale as Izzy Rogers.

In the episode "The Company", Shanola Hampton guest-starred as Cindi Burns, Derek Morgan's cousin who suffered from stockholm syndrome after marrying and giving birth to the son of her abductor, Malcolm Ford. In the episode "Divining Rod", Mackenzie Astin guest-starred as Dylan Kohler, the copycat killer of serial killer Rodney Baines Garrett. In the two-part season finale "Hit & Run", Josh Randall guest-starred as Matthew Downs, a member of the Face Cards and Izzy Rogers' lover, and Evan Jones guest-starred as Chris Stratton, another member of the Face Cards. Sebastian Roché reprises as Clyde Easter, Emily Prentiss' former partner at Interpol who offers her a job as Chief of the Interpol office in London, which she accepts, causing her departure from the BAU.

== Episodes ==
No. overall	No. in season	Title	Directed by	Written by	Original release date	Prod. code	U.S. viewers (millions)
139	1	"It Takes a Village"	Glenn Kershaw	Erica Messer	September 21, 2011	701	14.14
As the BAU testifies before a Senate Committee about their so-called vendetta against crime lord Ian Doyle (Timothy V. Murphy), a series of events are revealed in which an investigation into the disappearance of Doyle's son tests the team in ways they never imagined and causes a ghost from their past to return.
140	2	"Proof"	Karen Gaviola	Janine Sherman Barrois	September 28, 2011	702	12.58
When two teenage Durant, Oklahoma girls are sexually assaulted and blinded with sulfuric acid, the BAU searches for a killer determined to get revenge on his childhood love interest. Meanwhile, Reid struggles to overcome his anger against JJ and Prentiss for their deception regarding the latter's fake death.
141	3	"Dorado Falls"	Félix Alcalá	Sharon Lee Watson	October 5, 2011	703	13.43
When eight people are murdered in a mass shooting/stabbing at a Charlottesville, Virginia Internet security company, the BAU is called in to profile a traumatized U.S. Navy veteran who believes he is on a mission. Meanwhile, Prentiss works with Morgan to prepare for her recertification training.
142	4	"Painless"	Larry Teng	Breen Frazier	October 12, 2011	704	12.87
When a Boise, Idaho high school principal is killed in his home two days before the 10th anniversary of a massacre that occurred at his school, the BAU attempts to track down an injustice collector determined to fulfill a vendetta against the survivors. Meanwhile, Hotch grows increasingly concerned about Jack following a parent-teacher conference and Morgan and Reid engage in a prank war.
143	5	"From Childhood's Hour"	Anna J. Foerster	Bruce Zimmerman	October 19, 2011	705	13.15
When a nine-year-old St. Louis, Missouri boy disappears, the BAU searches for a killer targeting troubled mothers and their children and using his profession to gain his victims' trust. Meanwhile, Rossi uncovers a stunning secret after reconnecting with his first wife, Carolyn (Isabella Hofmann).
144	6	"Epilogue"	Guy Ferland	Rick Dunkle	November 2, 2011	706	12.94
When four men are drowned in lakes in California's Angeles National Forest, the BAU attempts to profile a terminally ill killer desperate for answers on what will happen to him after he dies. Meanwhile, Rossi contemplates carrying out Carolyn's request.
145	7	"There's No Place Like Home"	Rob Spera	Virgil Williams	November 9, 2011	707	11.36
When the mutilated bodies of two teenage boys are found outside Wichita, Kansas following a series of devastating tornadoes, the BAU sets out to catch a Frankenstein-esque killer with a sinister ulterior motive. Meanwhile, JJ deals with unexpected tensions on the home front.
146	8	"Hope"	Michael Watkins	Kimberly Ann Harrison	November 16, 2011	708	12.72
When a member of Garcia's victims' support group disappears shortly after acknowledging the seventh anniversary of her then eight-year-old daughter's abduction, the BAU sets out to establish a connection between the two events.
147	9	"Self-Fulfilling Prophecy"	Charlie Haid	Erica Messer	December 7, 2011	709	12.41
When five Florida military academy students are found hanged in an apparent mass suicide and a sixth student is reported missing, the BAU suspects actions are not what they seem as they attempt to connect the deaths and disappearance to a seventh student's death from two weeks earlier. Meanwhile, Morgan and Hotch become concerned with Strauss' behavior after she makes an uncharacteristic move.
148	10	"The Bittersweet Science"	Rob Hardy	Janine Sherman Barrois	December 14, 2011	710	12.88
When two men in Philadelphia, Pennsylvania are bludgeoned to death, the BAU sets out to track down a spree killer with connections to the city's boxing scene. Meanwhile, Hotch juggles training for an upcoming triathalton and becoming attracted to a fellow athlete (Bellamy Young).
149	11	"True Genius"	Glenn Kershaw	Sharon Lee Watson	January 18, 2012	711	13.00
When a couple is found gunned down in their car outside San Francisco, California and some familiar symbols are discovered at the crime scene, the BAU sets out to determine whether or not one of history's most elusive killers has returned. Meanwhile, Reid reflects on what he has achieved in life after meeting a fellow prodigy at a violent crimes seminar hosted by Patricia Cornwell in Chicago, Illinois.
150	12	"Unknown Subject"	Michael Lange	Breen Frazier	January 25, 2012	712	13.82
When a prolific Houston, Texas serial rapist responsible for sexually assaulting 12 women over the course of five years abducts one of his previous victims, the BAU juggles reopening the original investigation and tracking down another former victim determined to deliver her own brand of justice. Meanwhile, Prentiss struggles to restrain herself from becoming emotionally involved as the anniversary of her war against Ian Doyle approaches.
151	13	"Snake Eyes"	Doug Aarniokoski	Bruce Zimmerman	February 8, 2012	713	13.31
When an Atlantic City, New Jersey casino floor manager is found bludgeoned to death in his office with eight one-dollar bills surrounding a playing card on his corpse, the BAU suspects the crime was committed by a ritualistic killer with a gambling addiction. Meanwhile, Garcia fears the worst after waking up from a night of heavy drinking and finding an unexpected visitor in her apartment.
152	14	"Closing Time"	Jesse Warn	Rick Dunkle	February 15, 2012	714	12.19
When three out-of-town businessmen are gunned down, castrated postmortem, and hidden in a lifeguard tower in Los Angeles, California's Playa del Rey neighborhood, the BAU determines the victims and the killer are connected by personal losses. Meanwhile, Hotch prepares to go on his first date since Haley's death.
153	15	"A Thin Line"	Michael Watkins	Virgil Williams	February 22, 2012	715	12.78
When two San Bernardino, California families of four are gunned down in a brutal series of what appear to be gang-related home invasions, the BAU uncovers a shocking link between the crimes and the city's upcoming mayoral election. Meanwhile, Prentiss and Morgan argue after the latter reprimands an FBI Academy trainee for his mistakes during a training session.
154	16	"A Family Affair"	Rob Spera	Kimberly Ann Harrison	February 29, 2012	716	12.54
When three Atlanta, Georgia prostitutes are found stabbed to death, the BAU suspects the crimes were committed by a killing team. Meanwhile, Hotch prepares for the FBI triathlon and JJ plans a girls' night out with Prentiss and Garcia.
155	17	"I Love You, Tommy Brown"	John Terlesky	Janine Sherman Barrois	March 14, 2012	718	11.43
When three Seattle, Washington couples are shot execution-style, the BAU suspects the crimes were committed by a female killer attempting to repair her broken family. Meanwhile, Garcia grows anxious after overhearing a conversation between Kevin and Morgan.
156	18	"Foundation"	Dermott Downs	Jim Clemente	March 21, 2012	717	12.09
When a Latino teenager is found wandering the Arizona desert and a teenage Flagstaff boy is reported missing on the same night, the BAU suspects a local woman's repressed memories may hold the key to the kidnapper's identity. Meanwhile, Morgan uses his troubled past to forge a connection with the survivor.
157	19	"Heathridge Manor"	Matthew Gray Gubler	Sharon Lee Watson	April 4, 2012	719	11.34
When a Medford, Oregon woman is found dead from nicotine poisoning in a long-abandoned Salem psychiatric hospital and a list of potential victims is discovered at the crime scene, the BAU sets out to catch a satanist with a dangerous obsession that stems from a troubled past.
158	20	"The Company"	Nelson McCormick	Breen Frazier	April 11, 2012	720	11.81
When Morgan's younger sister, Desiree, is injured in a car accident after spotting a woman whom the latter claims is their cousin Cindi, who has been missing for the last eight years, the BAU travels to Chicago, Illinois and juggles reopening the original investigation and connecting the case to an alleged suicide that occurred two weeks after Cindi's disappearance.
159	21	"Divining Rod"	Doug Aarniokoski	Bruce Zimmerman	May 2, 2012	721	11.47
When an Enid, Oklahoma woman is stabbed to death immediately after the execution of a serial killer convicted of the murders of 25 other women in the same area over a two-year period, the BAU determines the crime was committed by a copycat who idolizes the original killer. Meanwhile, Prentiss grows anxious after placing an offer on a house.
160	22	"Profiling 101"	Félix Alcalá	Virgil Williams	May 9, 2012	722	11.62
The BAU presents one of their longest-tenured serial killer cases to an undergraduate criminology class, taking them through a 17-year chase for a prolific serial-turned-spree killer who murdered over 40 women up and down the West Coast by fatally removing their reproductive organs.
161	23	"Hit"	Michael Lange	Rick Dunkle	May 16, 2012	723	13.68
When a trio of serial-killing bank robbers take several people hostage in a Washington, D.C. bank, with one of the robbers getting gunned down by Will in the process, the BAU juggles profiling the trio and preventing the situation from devolving into a mass murder. Meanwhile, JJ becomes emotionally involved when Will is added to the hostages after a failed negotiation attempt and Prentiss receives a phone call that forces her to contemplate her future.
162	24	"Run"	Glenn Kershaw	Erica Messer	May 16, 2012	724	13.68
With the remaining members of the Face Cards on the run and Will considered alive but missing, the BAU sets out to prevent one of their own from meeting a violent end after determining the robberies were a front for a sinister ulterior motive. Meanwhile, Prentiss makes an earth-shattering decision that promises to forever redefine the team.

== Ratings ==
Episode	U.S. ratings			
Episode	Original airdate	Viewers (millions)	Rank	
Episode	Original airdate	Viewers (millions)	Night	Week
"It Takes a Village"	September 21, 2011	14.14	2	13
"Proof"	September 28, 2011	12.58	2	13
"Dorado Falls"	October 5, 2011	13.43	1	9
"Painless"	October 12, 2011	12.87	2	11
"Childhood's Hour"	October 19, 2011	13.15	2	11
"Epilogue"	November 2, 2011	12.94	2	15
"There's No Place Like Home"	November 9, 2011	11.36	2	17
"Hope"	November 16, 2011	12.72	2	11
"Self-Fulfilling Prophecy"	December 7, 2011	12.41	1	12
"The Bittersweet Science"	December 14, 2011	12.88	1	9
"True Genius"	January 18, 2012	13.00	2	11
"Unknown Subject"	January 25, 2012	13.82	3	5
"Snake Eyes"	February 8, 2012	13.31	2	11
"Closing Time"	February 15, 2012	12.19	2	10
"A Thin Line"	February 22, 2012	12.78	2	13
"A Family Affair"	February 29, 2012	12.54	2	8
"I Love You, Tommy Brown"	March 14, 2012	11.43	3	6
"Foundation"	March 21, 2012	12.09	2	6
"Heathridge Manor"	April 4, 2012	11.34	3	14
"The Company"	April 11, 2012	11.81	2	7
"Divining Rod"	May 2, 2012	11.47	2	11
"Profiling 101"	May 9, 2012	11.62	2	12
"Hit"	May 16, 2012	13.68	2	6
"Run"	May 16, 2012	13.68	2	6

== Home media ==
The Complete Seventh Season
Set details		Special features
24 episodes; 6-disc set (Region 1); 5-disc set (Region 2 & 4); Aspect Ratio: 1.85:1; Subtitles: English; English: Dolby Digital 5.1		Mind's Eye; Gag Reel; Deleted Scenes
DVD release date
Region 1	Region 2	Region 4
September 4, 2012	November 26, 2012	November 7, 2012
