= Kingman Place Historic District =

Historic district in Iowa, United States

- U.S. National Register of Historic Places
- U.S. Historic district
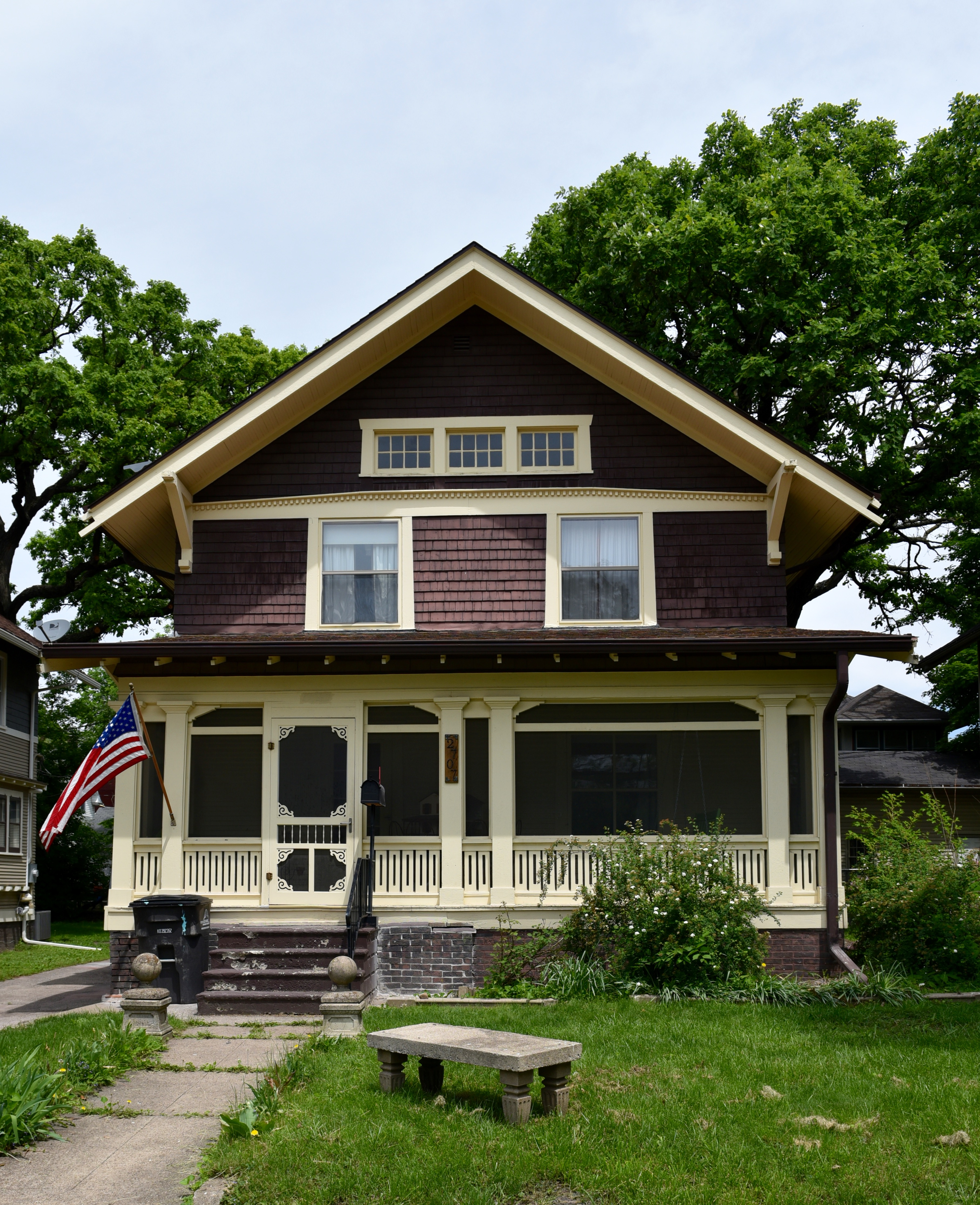
- A house within the district at 2707 Kingman Boulevard

- Location within Iowa Location within the United States
- Location: 27th to 31st Sts., Kingman Blvd., Rutland St. and Cottage Ave. Des Moines, Iowa
- Coordinates: 41°36′04″N 93°39′04″W
- Area: 18.54 acres (7.50 ha)
- Built: 1900-1915
- Architectural style: American Craftsman architecture Bungalow
- MPS: The Bungalow and Square House--Des Moines Residential Growth and Development MPS
- NRHP reference No.: 00000928
- Added to NRHP: November 21, 2000

The Kingman Place Historic District is located in Des Moines, Iowa, United States. The historic district contains a well-preserved collection of American Foursquare houses that were built starting in 1902 and continued until 1915. It has been listed on the National Register of Historic Places since 2000. It was part of The Bungalow and Square House--Des Moines Residential Growth and Development MPS.

== History ==
The historic district lies north of Kingman Boulevard and south of Cottage Grove Avenue, between 27th Street on the east and 31st Street on the west. It is composed of three full blocks and parts of two others in the Kingman and University plats. The plats are unique in Des Moines as they are oriented east to west as opposed to north to south. Because it developed within a few years it is composed of similar foursquare house plans. It has very few bungalows, which were also being built in Des Moines at the same time.

Cottage Grove Avenue was named in 1872 and the Cottage Grove Addition was platted that autumn. It was located between Cottage Grove and University Avenues and 21st and 23rd Streets. Nothing was developed until the University Land Company organized in 1881 and founded Drake University the same year. Houses began to be built in the area in the 1880s. A hack line was established at the same time and streetcar lines were extended the following decade. The Kingman Addition was platted by the Vermont Land Company in 1889. Brick paving on Cottage Grove began in 1889 and the area was annexed to the city of Des Moines a year later. The paving of Cottage Grove was extended west to 34th Street in 1891 and sewer lines were added in 1894. No houses were added to the district until after 1900. Explosive growth started in University Place in 1904. One of Des Moines’ first suburban banks was built in the area the same year. Around 200 houses were built in the area between 1900 and 1910. There were three definitive house building spurts in the Kingman Place Historic District in 1905, 1910 and 1915. The hip roof subtype of the foursquare house plan was dominate in 1905 and receded significantly by 1915, when front and side gabled roofs took over.

== Architecture ==
The Kingman Place Historic District is primarily composed of three subtypes of square house plans. Of the 66 square house plans in the district, 34 are four squares, 22 follow the front gable plan and 10 are side gable houses. The rest of the houses in the district represent a number of other styles, including the bungalow. Two of the houses are known as foursquare look-alikes that were built earlier from the others and feature Victorian architectural elements such as a wrap-around porch. Their room counts were also higher than eight, which are typical of the four squares.
