= Kingsman =

Kingsman or King's man may refer to:

- During the American Revolution, a King's man was a colonist of British America who remained loyal to the King of Great Britain
- Kingsman (rank), a British Army rank

== Arts and media ==
- Kingsman (franchise)
  - Kingsman (comics), the basis for the franchise
  - Kingsman: The Secret Service, a 2014 British spy-comedy film
  - Kingsman: The Golden Circle, a 2017 action spy−comedy film and sequel to the previous Kingsman film
  - The King's Man, a 2021 prequel to the previous Kingsman films
- King's Man, a 2011 novel in the Outlaw Chronicles series by Angus Donald

== People ==
- Paul Kingsman MBE (born 1967), New Zealand Olympic swimmer
- John Kingsman Beling (1919–2010), United States Navy rear admiral

== Other ==
- Kingsman SC, a Canadian soccer team

== See also ==
- The Kingsmen, an American 1960s beat/garage rock band
- Kingman (disambiguation)
- King's Men (disambiguation)
