= List of Third Watch episodes =

The following is a list of episodes for the NBC crime drama series Third Watch. The series premiered on September 23, 1999, and the final episode aired on May 6, 2005. A total of 132 episodes were produced over six seasons.

== Series overview ==
Season	Episodes	Originally released	
Season	Episodes	First released	Last released
1	22	September 23, 1999	May 22, 2000
2	22	October 2, 2000	May 21, 2001
3	21	October 22, 2001	May 13, 2002
4	22	September 30, 2002	April 28, 2003
5	22	September 29, 2003	May 7, 2004
6	22	September 17, 2004	May 6, 2005

== Episodes ==
=== Season 1 (1999–2000) ===
No. overall	No. in season	Title	Directed by	Written by	Original release date
1	1	"Welcome to Camelot"	Christopher Chulack	Story by : Edward Allen Bernero & John Wells; Teleplay by : John Wells	September 23, 1999
Ty Davis becomes a policeman like his father and Carlos Nieto becomes a paramedic. The two recruits work with older, wiser partners. Carlos works with the serious Monte "Doc" Parker and Ty works with John "Sully" Sullivan, his father's old partner. Meanwhile paramedics Bobby Caffey and Kim Zambrano rush from emergency to emergency; officers Maurice "Bosco" Boscorelli and Faith Yokas and firefighter Jimmy Doherty have other problems to deal with.
2	2	"Anywhere But Here"	Christopher Chulack	Edward Allen Bernero	September 26, 1999
The shooting of paramedic Jerry has Doc, Ty, and Carlos feeling guilty; Ty questions Sully about his father's death; a worried Jimmy gives ex-wife Kim a bulletproof vest; Fred wants Faith to quit her job.
3	3	"Patterns"	Christopher Chulack	John Ridley	October 3, 1999
Bosco is caught on a security camera having sex in his squad car with the daughter of his precinct captain. Meanwhile Doc drags Carlos around the city on a personal mission to find the owner of a watch, found in the ambulance.
4	4	"Hell Is What You Make Of It"	Christopher Misiano	Terri Kopp	October 10, 1999
The two rookies, Carlos and Davis, experience disillusionment with their new jobs, and with their training officers. Bosco struggles with homophobia and gets himself involved in tit for tat games with Doherty.
5	5	"Responsible Parties"	Félix Enríquez Alcalá	Edward Allen Bernero	October 31, 1999
Mercy's new E.R. attending gives the cops and paramedics a hard time while ignoring Carlos's attempts to hit on her; Doc is saddened to hear that Jerry has decided to take a disability retirement; Jimmy is upset when Joey goes to Bobby first after he becomes ill as a result of Jimmy's letting him overindulge in sweets; Jimmy and Bobby take out their conflict over Kim and Joey in a game of one-on-one; Sully and Ty arrest a purse snatcher who will do anything to stay in jail once he discovers that his victim's son is a mobster; Faith hands out street justice to a gang-banger responsible for the deaths of two little boys.
6	6	"Sunny, Like Sunshine"	R. W. Goodwin	John Wells	November 7, 1999
Sully and Maggie reconnect; Bobby visits his brother Matty and tries to prepare him for his release from prison. Sunny asks Kim for a place to stay and runs away when Kim refers her to a shelter. Carlos hits a pedestrian with the bus. Faith and Bosco investigate a grave robbery and ponder immortality. Jimmy rescues a new recruit who is trapped under a collapsed ceiling in an apartment fire. Bobby takes Doc's advice and tells Kim how he feels, only to learn that Kim feels she is not good enough for him. Sunny overdoses and Bobby helps a saddened Kim find out her real name and hometown so that her parents can be notified. Sully's approach to "problem-solving" goes horribly awry in a domestic dispute. Carlos and Doc come to blows over Doc's training methods, forcing Morales to break them up. Sully learns that Ty has good instincts, enabling them to save a teenage girl from a sexual predator.
7	7	"Impulse"	Félix Enríquez Alcalá	Lance Gentile	November 14, 1999
Ty is worried about Sully's dating Maggie. Faith and Bosco lose a witness who turns out to be the perp in a homicide. Bobby prepares for Matty's release from prison. While driving the bus, Carlos collides with a pregnant driver and later attempts to revive the baby she delivered prematurely after Dr. Morales pronounces it dead, unaware of the consequences for the parents. Jimmy rescues a boy from a tree. Bosco and Ty take issue with Sully over his handling of a belligerent caller.
8	8	"History of the World"	R. W. Goodwin	John Romano	November 21, 1999
On Thanksgiving Day, Bosco tries to resolve a family conflict in a restaurant while Faith deals with the same thing in her own home. Bobby's mother refuses to allow Matty to attend the family's holiday celebrations and leaves it up to Bobby to tell his brother. After a shooting, Ty and Sully disagree over how they should report the incident to their superiors and the investigating team.
9	9	"Modern Designs for Better Living"	Bryan Spicer	John Ridley	November 28, 1999
When he goes on his first raid, Davis inadvertently endangers a young boy he is trying to help. Doc begins to think that the overdose his father took may not have been accidental. To get a critically ill and obese woman to the hospital, the firefighters knock down an apartment wall and lower her out a high-story window.
10	10	"Demolition Derby"	Christopher Chulack	Theresa Rebeck	January 10, 2000
An explosion in a building about to be demolished leaves men trapped inside, forcing the firefighters to make terrible choices. Fred's drinking problem escalates. Doc cancels his date with Brenda.
11	11	"Alone in a Crowd"	Matt Penn	Edward Allen Bernero	January 17, 2000
Jimmy's failure to watch the firehouse door leads to tragedy. Morales, devastated by the loss of a young patient, reaches out to Doc for consolation. Sully's first partner commits suicide, prompting him to seek out Maggie and reflect on where his life has gone. Bosco tries to buy a 1967 GTO from a homeless man. Bobby continues to do whatever he can to get his mother to reconcile with his brother.
12	12	"Journey to the Himalayas"	Kenneth Fink	John Romano	January 24, 2000
Ty spends the shift on foot patrol with Candyman and discovers some disturbing facts about both his late father and Candyman. Romance blooms between Doc and Morales after Doc's father tells him to get on with his life. Matty's attempts to make amends for past misdeeds have upsetting outcomes. Jimmy has an unexpected and unpleasant visit with his bookie. Faith clashes with the mother of a missing girl. Sully puts in a good word for a hit-and-run driver to a completely unsympathetic D.A. Bobby is crushed to learn that Matty was an unwitting accessory to a felony homicide.
13	13	"This Band of Brothers"	Guy Norman Bee	John Wells	February 7, 2000
Faith, Bosco, Sully, Ty and Candyman race through the neighborhood on foot in pursuit of a trio of Uzi-armed thieves. Candyman risks his life to save Ty. Bosco's cold refusal to get medical assistance for one of the perps leads to the robber's death. Ty searches for the truth about his father. Bobby's mother tells the police where to find Matty, who desperately pleads with Bobby to give him some getaway money. Bobby agrees, but begs Matty to turn himself in. Matty gets high and takes off, leaving Bobby crushed and seeking consolation from Kim. Carlos finds out about Doc and Morales.
14	14	"32 Bullets and a Broken Heart"	Bryan Spicer	John Ridley	February 14, 2000
It is Valentine's Day and Bobby and Kim have spent the night together. Bobby's confession of love leads Kim to realize that they have made a big mistake. After agonizing all day, she finally confesses and breaks Bobby's heart. Seeking solace in a bottle, Bobby finds himself at a local bar next to a woman who has also been jilted and they go off to her place. Fred drunkenly totals the car on the way to pick up Emily and Charlie. Faith arrests him and refuses to bail him out. When Fred finally arrives at home, Faith has his things already packed and throws him out. Carlos tends to a girl who ran into a bus and she falls for him. The gay community is targeted by a gunman and a vigilante group forms to find the killer. Ty arrests a girl for auto theft who turns out to be Malcolm's sister. Faith lets Bosco know that she is fed up with his bigotry.
15	15	"Officer Involved"	Christopher Chulack	Edward Allen Bernero	February 21, 2000
As he comes around a corner in pursuit of a gunman, Davis shoots a man who is pointing a gun at Sully, unaware that the man is innocently returning the service revolver which Sully dropped when he fell. Davis's guilt leads him to doubt whether he should remain on the force, until Sully straightens him out. The tension between Bosco and Faith continues to escalate. Both Bobby and Jimmy introduce their new girlfriends to Kim, who is unhappy with the potential competition.
16	16	"Nature or Nurture"	Clark Johnson	Terri Kopp	February 28, 2000
Dealing with the aftermath of gang warfare, Doc and Carlos disagree over reaching out to prevent an eleven-year-old boy from following his brother into a gang. Bosco's decision to turn the tables on two men who try to rob him when he is off-duty could cost him his badge when the two men turn up at the precinct to report the crime. Jimmy gets deeper into debt with his bookie, which puts Joey in danger. Kim begins to worry about how little time she spends with Joey after he gets in trouble at school.
17	17	"Ohio"	Michael Fields	John Romano	March 20, 2000
The three squads are stationed at the Waldorf-Astoria Hotel to provide protection during a Clinton-Giuliani Senate race debate. The cops are assigned to the kitchen and discuss politics and the death penalty while Sully tries to get a reluctant head chef to feed them. The paramedics are parked in the hotel's garage where they talk about their worst cases, religion, relationships, and how life does not turn out as planned. Kim and Jimmy argue again over his irresponsibility after her paycheck is garnished to cover one of his bad debts. Jimmy resolves to clean up his act.
18	18	"Men"	Guy Norman Bee	Lance Gentile	April 10, 2000
Faith continues to have marital difficulties with Fred. When she meets up with an old flame at the scene of a car accident, she finds herself very tempted to accept his invitation to meet him in his hotel room to catch up on old times. Doc's dad ends up in intensive care, leaving him with some difficult decisions. A perp accuses 'Candyman' of stealing money from him when he arrested him. Davis believes the criminal and is not sure how he is going to answer IAB's questions about what happened, even though he did not see anything happen. The police station takes on the fire station in a basketball game.
19	19	"Spring Forward, Fall Back"	Christopher Chulack	John Wells	April 17, 2000
Carlos falls behind in his studies and then hears some shocking news from Vangie. The cops search for a two-year-old girl missing after her family is involved in a car crash. Bosco and Faith contend with a disabled man dealing drugs to children. Sully and Davis track down the alcoholic who attacked the pastor of Sully's church.
20	20	"A Thousand Points of Light"	Michael Fields	John Ridley	April 24, 2000
Doherty tries to save the mother of two young children from a fire. Meanwhile, Bosco and Faith are out looking for the man suspected of starting the fire in the first place. Davis tries to set Sully up on a blind date. After Malcolm's sister's pimp beats her up, Sully and Davis try to find Malcolm before he kills the pimp. Carlos' girlfriend problems escalate and Doc's relationship appears to be going to the next level.
21	21	"Just Another Night at the Opera"	Christopher Misiano	Edward Allen Bernero	May 15, 2000
Yokas and Bosco chase a carjacker into a multi-level garage. When the thief drives off the edge of the top level and crashes to the ground, Bobby risks his own life to save the driver. Much to everyone's surprise, Bosco goes to the opera with Nicole and her parents. Carlos gets into trouble with his boss and Vangie. Sully and Ty go to help Candyman on a job and Ty tells Candyman exactly what he thinks of him. Jimmy has news for Kim which surprises her, and she annoys Bobby every time she tries to talk to him about it.
22	22	"Young Men and Fire"	Christopher Chulack	John Wells	May 22, 2000
Doc and Carlos are rescued by the firefighters when they get trapped in an eighteenth-floor apartment with a patient who cannot walk. Ty comes to the end of his probationary period. Faith discovers that she is pregnant again. The firefighters are shot at by a madman when they arrive to fight a car fire and Jimmy is severely wounded.

=== Season 2 (2000–01) ===
No. overall	No. in season	Title	Directed by	Written by	Original release date	Prod. code
23	1	"The Lost"	Christopher Chulack	John Wells	October 2, 2000	226305
Sully lives his worst nightmare as the police search the city for a man buried alive and whose kidnappers are involved in a fatal car crash. Kim and Bobby find an abandoned four-year-old boy wandering the streets. Sully's mother wanders off from her nursing home. Carlos adopts a deceased patient's cockatoo.
24	2	"Faith"	Christopher Chulack	John Wells	October 9, 2000	226301
A rapist attacks three victims. Yokas agonizes over her finances, her marriage and her pregnancy. Bosco's jealousy threatens, and ultimately ends, his relationship with Nicole.
25	3	"Four Days"	Félix Enríquez Alcalá	Edward Allen Bernero & John Ridley	October 16, 2000	226302
On the hunt for a robbery homicide suspect, the police shake down all young black males they encounter, igniting racial tensions throughout the city. The suspect in question turns out to be Puppet, whose younger brother was killed as a result of Puppet's gang activity despite Doc's attempts to turn him away from the streets. After he is shot by the cops and goes into hiding, Puppet solicits Doc's help by proclaiming his innocence. The ensuing lengths to which Doc goes to get Puppet to the hospital and save his life while avoiding the cops wreak havoc on Doc's relationships with both civilians and the squads.
26	4	"Jimmy's Mountain"	Charles Haid	Lance Gentile & Terri Kopp	October 23, 2000	226303
Jimmy's recovery complicates his return to the firehouse as he tries to take on too much, causing discord amongst his fellow firefighters over his all-consuming need to prove his abilities have not been lost. Meanwhile, Alex Taylor joins the firehouse with some baggage of her own.
27	5	"Kim's Hope Chest"	Félix Enríquez Alcalá	Kyera B. Keenne & Janine Sherman Barrois	October 30, 2000	226306
Joey starts a fire while on a field trip with his class, causing Kim and Jimmy to reevaluate their parenting styles and inspiring Kim to try to rebuild her family, starting with a reconciliation with Jimmy. But Jimmy's relationship with Brooke is not nearly as wobbly as Kim would like to think, and Kim ends up jumping into bed with a stranger and then commiserating with her mother over her problems with men, ending in a confrontation with Brooke that forces Kim to rethink what is best for Joey in the matter.
28	6	"The Tys That Bind"	Nick Gomez	Bonnie Mark	November 6, 2000	226304
Davis rescues a drowning newscaster from a downed helicopter, and the ensuing rush of media coverage on his heroism brings a strange young woman to meet him. She turns out to be his half-sister, and Davis uncovers secrets about his father's second family. The turmoil from the revelations causes disturbances between Davis and nearly everyone close to him. Meanwhile, someone is throwing bricks at random citizens, putting everyone in the city on edge.
29	7	"After Hours"	Guy Norman Bee	Edward Allen Bernero	November 20, 2000	226307
The deaths of four teenagers in a fiery car crash profoundly affects the third watch, who were unable to save them; they congregate at the end of the shift to dispel their sadness and anger at the horrific images. Faith, Sully and Doc spend time sitting quietly in a cafe; Ty, Bobby, and Alex go to a bar; and Kim, Carlos and Jimmy go bowling. As evening turns to day, Faith's group meets up with a young woman, Ty's group meets up with a young man, and Kim's group meets up with a young couple in love. Bosco, meanwhile, floats around all three groups while suffering privately. At dawn, everyone ends up at a beach and they build a bonfire. As the flames flicker, a flashback to the moments preceding the car crash is shown. It turns out the young people they met during the course of the evening were the dead teens whose spirits were sent back down to earth to tell Alex, Ty, Bosco, Faith, Jimmy, Doc, Bobby, Kim, Sully and Carlos that the crash could not have been prevented, and they are not to blame for what happened.
30	8	"Know Thyself"	Nancy Savoca	Julie Hébert	November 27, 2000	226308
While coping with work demands, a recovering alcoholic husband and a disturbing visit with her parents, Yokas confronts her long-held beliefs and emotions. A group of prisoners escape from a delivery truck. Yokas and Fred have another big fight in which she accuses him of drinking again. She tells him that she had an abortion. He wants her to leave the house, and she stays over at her parents' home. However, by the end of the episode, they are back together. She realizes that she cannot live without him and that she is sorry for accusing him of still drinking. Meanwhile, Bosco gets a bunch of flowers from a former lover. He smells the flowers, which turn out to be poison Ivy. Bosco and Yokas also have a fight when she tells him that she had an abortion. He accuses her of lying to him and he refuses to speak to her until she forces him to go the hospital to sort out the poison ivy problem. She regrets lying to him.
31	9	"Run of the Mill"	Félix Enríquez Alcalá	Bonnie Mark	December 4, 2000	226309
The ordeals of an elderly friend prompt Sully to consider his own loneliness; Alex regrets revealing that she discovered Jimmy on the eve of his wedding having sex with an old flame who happens to be Lombardo's current girlfriend after the news spreads like wildfire throughout the squad; Jimmy and Brooke get married.
32	10	"History"	Jace Alexander	Lance Gentile	December 18, 2000	226311
A disturbing visit from his former high school girlfriend forces Doc to confront a horrible act he has hidden for years; Carlos struggles to pass a medical school qualification exam.
33	11	"A Hero's Rest"	Christopher Chulack	Edward Allen Bernero	January 15, 2001	226310
Bosco, Yokas, Sully and Davis search for a cop killer on the streets and cope with an obnoxious new sergeant at the station house.
34	12	"True Love"	Lesli Linka Glatter	John Wells	January 22, 2001	226312
A secret threatens to destroy Jimmy's relationships at work and home; Sully makes a date with his pretty neighbour; Bosco gets violent after his mother is beaten by her boyfriend.
35	13	"Duty"	Guy Norman Bee	Edward Allen Bernero	January 29, 2001	226313
Sully is upset when he is wrongly accused of falsifying evidence; Bobby helps one of his former teachers dying from cancer; Carlos deludes himself into thinking that Kim is falling in love with him; Sully gets closer to his pretty neighbour.
36	14	"A Rock and A Hard Place"	Félix Enríquez Alcalá	Bonnie Mark	February 5, 2001	226314
Faith, Bosco, Carlos and a wounded Doc find themselves trapped in an abandoned tunnel and unable to reach Central on their radios; the firefighters get into mischief during a long lull between calls; when the C.O. cannot raise Bosco on the radio, Sully tries to cover for him.
37	15	"Requiem for a Bantamweight"	Christopher Chulack	John Wells	February 12, 2001	226315
Bobby comes to the aid of his old friend Paulie after Paulie's sister begs Bobby to help her brother with his drug addiction, but becomes enraged when Paulie breaks into Bobby's mother's house and robs her to support his habit.
38	16	"Unfinished Business"	Félix Enríquez Alcalá	Edward Allen Bernero	February 26, 2001	226316
Bobby's attempt to keep Paulie away from drugs ends tragically.
39	17	"The Self-Importance of Being Carlos"	Jace Alexander	John Ridley	March 19, 2001	226317
Doc and Carlos attend a stress debriefing; Carlos meets up with Bosco when he is ordered to attend sensitivity training.
40	18	"Honor"	Terrence O'Hara	Kyera B. Keenne & Janine Sherman Barrois	April 16, 2001	226318
The firefighters take on a rival firehouse for touch football bragging rights, but the two groups must later set their rivalry aside to battle a massive warehouse blaze; Brooke files for divorce; Jimmy worries that he may be a father again.
41	19	"Walking Wounded"	Jesus Salvador Trevino	Bonnie Mark	April 23, 2001	226319
Faith and Bosco hunt down the dealer who distributed a batch of lethal heroin; depressed over Bobby's death, Kim attempts suicide.
42	20	"Man Enough"	Guy Norman Bee	Julie Hébert	April 30, 2001	2263
Doc is thrilled when Sarah accepts his proposal, but is stunned when she informs him that she is accepting a job offer in Philadelphia and wants him to relocate. Doc is unable to do so and still has lingering grief over his late wife, leading to him and Sarah breaking up.
43	21	"Exposing Faith"	Nick Gomez	Whitney Boole Williams & Edward Allen Bernero	May 14, 2001	226321
Faith's excitement over having her husband to herself for the weekend is dashed when Fred decides to spend the time trying to win a truck; angry, Faith organizes a drunken girls' night out, meets a handsome photographer, and ponders an affair and what might have been. Fred outwits his opponents and wins the truck.
44	22	"...and Zeus Wept"	Guy Norman Bee	John Wells	May 21, 2001	226322
Ty, Sully, Bosco, and Faith rush to the scene of a school shooting; Sully and Tatiana ponder their future together; Kim continues to struggle with her depression.

=== Season 3 (2001–02) ===
No. overall	No. in season	Title	Directed by	Written by	Original release date	Prod. code
SPE	SPE	"In Their Own Words"	Christopher Chulack	Narration written by: John Wells	October 15, 2001	227708
This was a special non-fiction episode which told, in their own words, the real stories of the police officers, firefighters, paramedics, emergency services personnel, and their families in the aftermath of the September 11 attacks. The regular starring cast members did brief introductions to each of this documentary's segments, which featured the real police officers, firefighters, paramedics, and emergency services personnel who work as part-time technical advisors and cast members, including Billy Walsh, in the production of every regular Third Watch episode. This episode has only aired twice, the first time being its original air date and the second being on the first anniversary of the attacks, where it aired on A&E. On March 27, 2002, this episode received the prestigious George Foster Peabody Award for Excellence in Broadcasting. Molly Price, who plays Faith Yokas, did not do a segment introduction. Instead, she was interviewed in one of the segments since her husband is firefighter Derek Kelly who was involved in the rescue operation and plays D. K. on the show.
45	1	"September Tenth"	Guy Norman Bee	John Wells	October 22, 2001	227707
On September 10, 2001, Ty and Sully are in Atlantic City on the eve of Sully's wedding to Tatiana. Kim sinks deeper into depression. Bosco searches for anything to do after someone lets out the result of the Giants game he had taped to watch after shift. Jimmy keeps trying to catch up on some sleep after nursing a sick Joey. What each character was doing the morning of September 11, 2001: Doc (at 6 a.m.): Starting to renovate his new house. Bosco: At a girl's apartment in Chelsea. A plane is heard flying over the apartment. Faith and Fred: In the subway. The train comes to an emergency stop. They are next seen outside the subway, Faith gets a ride in a patrol car after showing her badge and I.D. while giving instructions to Fred involving the children. Jimmy and Alex: Finishing their double shift, in which the call for the explosion was announced. They are next seen getting the equipment on board their fire truck with everyone from both shifts. Kim: At home. Her mom calls her and tells her to turn the TV on. She is next seen running toward the fire station. Sully and Ty: In Atlantic City; they are in a casino. Both see a crowd of people at a bar, watching the TV set. They watch what is going on TV, then immediately start running out.
46	2	"After Time"	Félix Enríquez Alcalá	Story by : Edward Allen Bernero; Teleplay by : Edward Allen Bernero & John Wells	October 29, 2001	227709
It is September 21, 2001, and the squads continue to battle through their emotions and their misgivings about their hero status, while working double shifts and spending every free moment at "the pile" searching for the missing. Kim returns to work and teams up with Doc, which allows an emotionally frayed Alex to return to paramedic duty; an exhausted Sully attempts to co-exist with his prospective in-laws while he waits for an opportunity to marry Tatiana.
47	3	"The Relay"	Guy Norman Bee	Edward Allen Bernero & Scott Williams	November 12, 2001	227703
After a despondent woman steps off an eight-story apartment building, the squad finds themselves in a race to transport both the woman's heart and a dying girl to a local hospital in time to save the youngster's life. The suicide hits home for Faith as she comes to grips with her own ongoing medical problems, while Doc expresses concern over the emotional effects this case will have on Kim, despite her constant reassurance that her accident was not an attempt to kill herself.
48	4	"Adam 55-3"	Jesus Salvador Trevino	Story by : John Wells & Scott Williams; Teleplay by : John Wells	November 19, 2001	227704
Even though his co-workers want to nominate him for the "Paramedic of the Year" award, a pensive Doc is disheartened as he considers his unfulfilled life. He later teams with Kim as they try to save a heart-attack victim while fending off a woman wielding a meat cleaver. In addition, Doc tries to minister to a chronic old drunk and a teenaged girl who attempts suicide in her bathtub. Meanwhile, Faith secretly undergoes a procedure to determine if the lump in her breast is cancerous, leaving an unsuspecting Bosco assigned to a nervous rookie cop; Kim reluctantly consults a lawyer about Jimmy's intention to claim custody of Joey.
49	5	"He Said, She Said"	Nelson McCormick	Julie Hébert	November 26, 2001	227705
During a sweep for prostitutes, Faith and Bosco tragically misjudge a sexual encounter between a young woman and a man in a car to be consensual; the situation spirals out of control when the girl later claims she was sexually assaulted while the cops laughed it off; Carlos considers a willing Ty as a potential roommate candidate.
50	6	"Childhood Memories"	Nelson McCormick	Edward Allen Bernero	December 3, 2001	227706
Bosco runs from the present and his past when he is wrongly suspected of murdering a sexual-assault suspect. As Faith tries to gather evidence to clear him, Bosco turns to his dysfunctional family, including his alcoholic mother, drug-addicted brother and estranged, abusive father. An emotionally rattled Kim virtually kidnaps Joey from Jimmy while Carlos actively solicits Ty to be his new roommate.
51	7	"Act Brave"	Brooke Kennedy	Scott Williams	December 10, 2001	227710
Still locked in a custody battle over Joey, Jimmy and Kim meet with a court-appointed evaluator and plead their cases. When Sully and Tatiana visit his mother at her nursing home, Tatiana expresses concern over the quality and cost of his mother's care. Convinced that she can do a better job of taking care of her at home, she signs her out and moves her in with them. Sully is shocked and displeased, and tells Tatiana that it will be too difficult for her to take care of his mother. Alex tries to stay busy to avoid dealing with her feelings about her father's death. Eager to fill empty hours and maintain the brave front her father insisted upon when she was growing up, she works extra shifts and even helps Carlos and Ty move into their new apartment. While Carlos is downstairs unloading the truck, Alex takes Ty up on his previous offer to talk and asks him about his father, who also died in the line of duty. She shows him a chain that she wears around her neck which contains her father's 20-year service ring and the St. Florian medal he gave her the day she passed the department exam. Soon after the shift begins, an immense explosion rocks a local diner and ruptures a gas main. After everyone is evacuated, Alex realizes that her chain has fallen off in the diner, and she goes back inside to retrieve it. Just as she finds it, she sees a little girl trapped under fallen equipment and calls for help. The girl begs Alex to stay with her and she does, even though it means disobeying a direct order from Lt. Johnson to leave before there is another explosion. Johnson and Doherty finally free the girl and Alex rides with her in the ambulance. Ty joins Alex at the hospital as she watches the girl sleeping; she asks him more questions about the loss of his father and finally begins to open up to him about her fear and grief. Doc later takes Alex to task for disobeying Lt. Johnson's order, puts Carlos on the schedule in her place for the double she signed up to work that evening and sends her home to get some rest. Jimmy and Kim cool down and agree to celebrate Joey's upcoming birthday together, even if it is just for one day. Alex goes to Ty's apartment. Sully tucks in his mother, and Yokas tucks in Charlie. In the last scene, Ty is shown holding Alex in the shower.
52	8	"Sex, Lies & Videotape"	Félix Enríquez Alcalá	Janine Sherman Barrois	January 7, 2002	227711
Alex wants Ty to keep their relationship quiet. When Carlos almost walks in on them, he is so shocked and happy that Ty is straight that he fails to realize the girl is Alex. Carlos lets Ty know that Jason Christopher is the one who told him that Ty was gay. Faith finishes her radiation treatments and is in poor shape, but ignores Dr. Case's advice to take some time off. When everyone notices how sick she looks at the beginning of the tour, she lies and says she caught a bug from her kids. Later, Sully and Ty are called to rescue a family that has been shot and left for dead in the river. When they arrive at the scene, the father, Jared McKinley, tells them that they were abducted, robbed, driven to the river and shot. Hoping to locate some witnesses, Sully and Ty run a check on the license plates of the cars parked along the river and find that one of the cars was registered to McKinley, which makes him their prime suspect in the shootings. While McKinley is being treated at the hospital, a dispatch about holding him for questioning comes through, which he overhears. McKinley escapes by pushing Doc through a plate glass window and stealing a car parked in the ambulance bay. Doc pursues him on foot until Sully and Ty drive up to the hospital and begin to follow him. McKinley leads them on a high-speed chase, and evades them when Sully and Ty become involved in a multi-vehicle accident. Bosco and Faith take up the chase, first by car, and then on foot when McKinley crashes into another car and runs from the scene into a nearby apartment building. Barely able to keep up, Faith repeatedly asks Bosco to wait for the backup she has requested and collapses on the stairs, forcing Bosco to press on alone. Bosco finds McKinley behind an open door; they struggle fiercely until McKinley manages to get Bosco's gun and shoot him in the chest. Faith comes to the open door, tells McKinley that she needs to check on Bosco, and offers to put her gun away if he will put down Bosco's gun. As he raises Bosco's gun to shoot her, the ESU team on an adjacent roof shoots and kills him. Back at the hospital, Bosco is treated for a broken rib and Faith finally tells him the truth about her cancer treatments. Doc has been named one of the finalists in the "Medic of the Year" contest, and is being followed and filmed by a documentary crew from the Trauma Response tv show. The crew is a nuisance to everyone but Carlos, who tries to get on camera as much as he can. At the scene of Sully and Ty's MVA, a young teenager who was a passenger in one of the cars is not breathing; Kim is having trouble intubating him. Since they must do something quickly, Doc goes against regulations and removes the boy's cervical collar to do so. At the hospital, they discover the boy will recover, but is now a quadriplegic. Later that evening when Doc views the documentary crew's footage of the accident scene, he realizes that he caused the boy's quadriplegia when he removed the cervical collar.
53	9	"Transformed"	Guy Norman Bee	Paul G. Golding	January 14, 2002	227712
Faith returns to work from a few days off. She apologizes to Bosco for hiding her illness and promises never to shut him out again. Filled with guilt, Doc begins to second-guess himself on every call. Kim reminds him that Ryan would have choked to death had Doc not removed Ryan's collar and intubated him. She also tells him repeatedly that everyone makes mistakes, but her words do not seem to have any effect. He begins to visit Ryan daily, clinging to the slim hope that the paralysis may only be temporary. Doc's prayers are answered one evening when Ryan is able to move his fingers. Kim and Doc treat a junkie whose boyfriend maintains that she was injured in a fall. When it becomes apparent to them that her injuries were caused by a beating, the boyfriend flees the scene. Soon after they arrive at the hospital, she dies, and the hunt is on for her killer. With some time on their hands, Bosco and Faith decide to roust some junkies. They make an arrest and bring the perp into the station house, where he collapses. When Doc and Kim answer this call, they discover that Bosco and Faith's prisoner is the man who beat his girlfriend to death. Meanwhile a young firefighter, Kyle Prescott, comes into the station house to try out for the squad. The mere sight of him irritates Alex, who is concerned that his presence means that she will not return to firefighting. Lt. Johnson agrees to take her back on the squad and finds a paramedic to replace her. This eases her anxiety about Prescott, and she later engages him in conversation. He tells her that he worked with her father, and lets her know that her father was very proud of her; she finally softens her demeanor towards him. While Jimmy watches him play in the park, Joey falls from the monkey bars and breaks his arm. Jimmy takes Joey to the ER and seeks to minimize the accident to assuage his feelings of guilt. When Kim finds out about Joey, she becomes very upset, despite being told by Jimmy and Ty and Sully that it is no big deal for a little boy to break a bone. She considers telling her attorney about the accident, but realizes that children have accidents that cannot always be prevented. The squad is called to a burning house where two children and a baby sitter are trapped. Jimmy and Prescott easily rescue the sitter and the infant, but Jimmy gets trapped by the flames when he attempts to rescue Max, a little boy the same age as Joey. Walsh and D. K. get Jimmy and the boy out safely. When Jimmy visits Max in the hospital, his parents are extremely grateful, but Max wants nothing to do with him. After his shift is over, Jimmy goes to Catherine's house to check on Joey and finds Kim there. He visits briefly then leaves. As he stands outside, he calls his answering machine on his cell phone and hears a message from his attorney that the judge is going to award him sole custody of Joey. He looks through Catherine's window with a pained expression on his face as he sees Kim and Joey cuddled up together on the couch.
54	10	"Old Dogs, New Tricks"	Dave Chameides	Edward Allen Bernero	January 21, 2002	227713
Ryan is now walking during his physical therapy sessions. Carlos decides to take a ride on the fire pole and falls, losing consciousness. Doc, Kim and Alex bring him to the ER where he is finally awake and combative. Dr. Thomas admits him to the hospital for observation and the nursing staff settles a score with Carlos by putting him in a room with Rodger, a drunk he brought in the day before. Rodger is alternating between screaming, crying, whimpering and non-stop talking – all at the top of his lungs. He is going through delirium tremens and cannot be sedated because he admits to being drunk since 1987. While Doc is in the ER filling out the paperwork on Carlos, he runs into his old partner, Jerry Mankowitz. Jerry insists upon taking him out to dinner, during which Doc opens up to him about removing Ryan's cervical collar. He admits that he was jealous of all the attention the documentary crew gave Carlos, and wonders if he was playing to the camera when he removed the collar. Jerry tells him that he did the right thing by saving Ryan's life and to stop visiting him and drawing attention to his unusual interest in his case. Doc has Kim and Alex partner up for the day, which works out very well. When they go out on a call to treat a man injured in a bar fight and run into Sully and Ty, Kim notices a vibe between Alex and Ty. When Kim asks her about it later, Alex admits that they are involved. When Tatiana leaves Sully's mother alone for a few minutes to go to the store and get some milk, Mrs. Sullivan gets a bad burn on her arm. In the ER, Dr. Thomas tells Sully that her injury is severe and may require surgery, and is complicated by her previously undiagnosed diabetes. He admits her to the hospital and tells Sully that she needs to go to a nursing home when she is discharged. Sully overcomes his initial anger at Tatiana for leaving his mother alone when he sees how devastated and sorrowful she is over his mother's injury. Bosco drags Faith along to do surveillance on Charlie B, a drug dealer he has been trying to get off the street. Bosco popped him five times while Faith was out sick, but could never find his stash. The surveillance pays off and they bring Charlie and the drugs into the stationhouse. Looking for bigger fish to fry, Bosco convinces him to set up his distributor in exchange for getting the charges against him dropped. Charlie sets up the meet in a parking lot but when the distributor arrives, Bosco is shocked to discover that it is his brother Michael. Unable to sleep, Carlos wanders the floor and sees Ryan saying goodbye to Jerry Mankowitz. After Jerry leaves, Carlos tells Ryan that they worked together until Jerry was shot on the job; Ryan reveals that Jerry is now working as a private investigator for his personal injury attorney.
55	11	"The Long Guns"	Brooke Kennedy	Julie Hébert	January 28, 2002	227714
In his ongoing quest to join the SWAT team, Bosco befriends an embittered but wily squad veteran, Glen Hobart, who instructs him in the art of distance shooting. When Hobart's emotional problems cause him to lose control, Bosco must endure his mentor's self-destructive tendencies. Meanwhile, Carlos is repulsed when he learns about Alex's sexual relationship with Ty. The cops search for an armed and drug-addled thief, and Faith's latest scary incident on patrol prompts her to ponder taking the test to earn a desk job as a sergeant.
56	12	"Cold Front"	Guy Norman Bee	Scott Williams	February 4, 2002	227715
Hurt and betrayed, Doc confronts Jerry Mankowitz for tricking him into confiding vital information about a pending malpractice suit by not revealing that his old partner is now working as an attorney's investigator. Doc later responds to an emergency involving a near-frozen, comatose elderly woman trapped in ice and in doing so, is reminded that his job is worth the legal fight ahead. Meanwhile, Carlos worries that he got the wrong telephone number from his latest romantic conquest, Faith thinks that troubled Bosco has lost his enthusiasm for police work and Jimmy struggles to act as both mother and father to Joey.
57	13	"Superheroes: Part 1"	Nelson McCormick	Story by : Jorge Zamacona & Edward Allen Bernero; Teleplay by : Edward Allen Bernero	February 25, 2002	227716
Bosco is giving Faith the cold shoulder and he teams up with Ross for patrol. They get a call for a drive-by shooting involving C-Note's brother. Faith teams up with rookie Gusler; they investigate a murder perpetrated by the Russian gangsters witnessed by an elderly man; in the next episode he becomes a victim himself after testifying to the police. Tatiana's son is admitted to the ER after being beaten by Russian gangsters. She begs Sully not to confront them. Sully and Davis do so anyway, and get ambushed by C-Note's gang when Davis gets shot.
58	14	"Superheroes: Part 2"	Julie Hébert	Edward Allen Bernero	March 4, 2002	227717
The police officers sort through the carnage and count their dead in the wake of a shootout between rival gangs. While Faith tries to interrogate Fyodor Chevchenko, a ruthless Russian mob boss, Sully worries about the severely wounded Ty and regrets causing the incident. Tatiana chastises Sully for hassling her injured son. Faith worries about Gusler, her ineffective, frightened rookie partner and a weary Doc gets some unexpected good news about his medical malpractice suit.
59	15	"Thicker Than Water"	Félix Enríquez Alcalá	Whitney Boole Williams	April 1, 2002	227718
During the investigation of the gang shootout, the police officers are questioned and presented with evidence which suggests that Ross was killed by friendly fire. Carlos learns that Vangie is dead and that he is the father of the baby her sister leaves at the firehouse. On the first anniversary of Bobby's death, Kim quarrels with Jimmy over her visitation with Joey and confronts a female gang during a call. Doc is visited by the father of a former patient whose debilitating injury may have been caused by Doc's error during treatment.
60	16	"Falling"	Jesus Salvador Trevino	Janine Sherman Barrois	April 8, 2002	227719
Bosco's emotional turmoil escalates when he begins to experience panic attacks and flashbacks, but he denies there is anything wrong. After he has a panic attack while driving the patrol car and nearly causes a crash, Sully insists that Bosco see his friend Brian O'Malley, a therapist and a former cop. Bosco angrily resists O'Malley's suggestion that the panic attacks and flashbacks to the incidents with Shaquana Golden, Jared McKinley and Glen Hobart are the result of September 11 post-traumatic stress disorder, and storms out of the counseling session. His personal crisis comes to a head when he is suspended from duty for a week and ordered into mandatory counseling for punching a suspect already in custody. Shaken, he visits Faith at home and finally breaks down, relating the horror of watching people fall to their deaths from the Towers, unable to help them, ashamed that his fear left him frozen and unable to go back and help anyone else for several hours. Carlos starts an open adoption process for Kylie, but fails to follow through on appointments as he becomes more attached to her. Ty pitches in to help with the babysitting, and saves Kylie's life when she suddenly becomes very ill and stops breathing. Fred invests his hopes for a better future for his family on Faith's passing the sergeant's exam, and reacts angrily when he learns that Faith's preoccupation with Bosco's well-being may have caused her to fail it.
61	17	"The Unforgiven"	Félix Enríquez Alcalá	Teleplay by : Jorge Zamacona & Julie Hébert & Scott Williams; Story by : Jorge Zamacona	April 15, 2002	227702
Tatiana is still missing; Sully continues to search for her while grieving her loss. When he comes upon the body of a six-year-old girl in a box on a curb, he becomes strangely unnerved. Haunted by this sight and by thoughts of the mistakes he has made recently, he takes the rest of the day off sick, and winds up in a local restaurant where he finds his parish priest. They ruminate on the nature of guilt, absolution, forgiveness, faith and the intercession of God as they recall the fate of another man who also made mistakes and tried to fix them, and whose life ended tragically at Sully's hand. Sully finally comes to a place where he can forgive himself and go on with life, and seeks out Davis to once again beg his forgiveness and reaffirm their connection to each other.
62	18	"The Greater Good"	Vincent Misiano	Lance Gentile	April 22, 2002	227720
Hopelessly in love with Kylie and concerned that she will lose her Latina heritage if she is adopted by a white couple, Carlos considers raising her until he realizes that they can give her the sister, grandparents and extended family that he cannot; Kim's preoccupation with her new PDA drives Alex crazy until they are able to use it to save a very sick man, thus redeeming themselves in the eyes of a hypercritical Dr. Peterson. Faith and Fred are still on uneven ground about the sergeant's exam. In an effort to shake Chevchenko's tree, Faith and Sully execute a clever plan to disrupt the Russian's bookmaking operation, which also opens the door to the possibility of the still-missing Tatiana's return. Bosco is cleared for duty, and he and Faith agree to be partners again as soon as he returns.
63	19	"Unleashed"	Guy Norman Bee	Edward Allen Bernero	April 29, 2002	227721
When Dr. Susan Lewis from Chicago comes to New York to search for the missing daughter of her drug-addicted sister, Faith and Bosco focus their attention on the child's stepfather, a New Jersey cop, after they discover that the girl was taken by a man in uniform. Tatiana returns home; Jimmy spends some quality time with Joey. This episode concludes a crossover with ER that begins on "Brothers and Sisters". Sherry Stringfield guest stars as Susan Lewis.
64	20	"Two Hundred and Thirty-Three Days"	Brooke Kennedy	John Wells	May 6, 2002	227722
Rescuers find the body of Alex's father, and he is given a hero's burial. Faith and Bosco tail a convicted rapist released on appeal, certain that he will rape again. Dissatisfied by Tatiana's explanation of her whereabouts the eight weeks she was missing, Sully investigates further and uncovers some astonishing and heartbreaking facts about his wife. After Chevchenko threatens to kill him if he does not roll over on Faith and Sully, Frankie tells Swersky that the raid on Chevchenko's numbers business was a hummer bust, leading Chevchenko to threaten a lawsuit and have another angry confrontation with Sully.
65	21	"Blackout"	Christopher Chulack	Edward Allen Bernero	May 13, 2002	227701
When a blackout strikes the city during a heat wave, Sully prophetically warns the more optimistic Ty that trouble in the streets will swiftly ensue. After Carlos leaves the ambulance running to keep the bus cool while he and Doc are on calls, the engine catches fire and the ambulance is destroyed. A wealthy old man confined to his bed by illness offers them a large amount of money to stay with him until his daughter arrives. Doc insists that they leave to treat others more in need over the protests of Carlos. Bosco arrests a young man, Latrell Griffith, and faces a difficult decision when an immigrant shop owner shoots and wounds a teenage shoplifter. After Latrell uses his training as a medic to save the boy, a riot breaks out and Bosco, Latrell and the shoplifter barely escape. Nightfall brings more unrest as the nervous cops try to keep the peace. Faith and Fred are stuck in an elevator when the power goes out. Faith tries to calm Fred's mounting anxiety about being trapped, and is left helpless when Fred suffers a heart attack.

=== Season 4 (2002–03) ===
No. overall	No. in season	Title	Directed by	Written by	Original release date
67	1	"Lights Up"	Guy Norman Bee	Edward Allen Bernero	September 30, 2002
As the blackout continues throughout the city, the squads face looting, fires, and riots which occur in its wake. Battling an angry mob, Sully and Ty rescue an injured man and woman who turn out to be George Hancock, the Chief of Patrol, and his mistress Nancy. The paper publishes a picture of Ty carrying Hancock from the scene on the front page and hails Ty as a hero cop, much to his disgust. Against Ty's better judgment, Sully cooperates with the brass in whitewashing Hancock's presence at the scene. After Nancy collapses at the hospital, she is rushed into surgery, but not before denying Dr. Field's assessment that she has been raped. Bosco roams the city looking for Faith and finally tracks her down just as Faith manages to carry Fred out of the building after rescuing him from the elevator. After they race him to Mercy, an overwrought Faith lashes out viciously and unfairly, first at Proctor and then at Bosco. As painful as her words are to hear, Bosco realizes the truth behind some of them and decides to change his ways, starting with picking up Faith and Fred's kids and bringing them to the hospital and later by "losing" the evidence against Latrell and letting him go free so he can stay on the list for paramedic hires. Sully tells Tatiana that he believes her when she says that she is not the Natasha Guerin on the rap sheet with the four prostitution arrests and that it is a mistake. Later that evening after she falls asleep, Sully takes her vodka glass, puts it in an evidence bag, and hides it. Doc and Carlos argue again, and this time Doc is on the receiving end of a partner's harsh truths.
68	2	"The Chosen Few"	Nelson McCormick	Scott Williams	October 7, 2002
An excited Bosco signs up for temporary duty on an elite undercover unit to investigate a gang weapons ring but chafes under the authority of an abrasive female leader (guest star Elizabeth Rodriguez) while Yokas gets more bad news about Fred's heart problems. Elsewhere, a distrusting Sully learns more than he wants about Tatiana's sordid past with the Russian mob; Doc is surprised by the news that his ex, Doctor Morales, has got married, and Davis is ordered to report to George Hancock, the Chief of Patrol whose life he saved.
69	3	"To Protect..."	Jesus Salvador Trevino	Janine Sherman Barrois	October 14, 2002
The frightened parents of a missing boy seek vengeance against a known child molester in their building while the police desperately search until they think they have found the victim – but only firefighter Alex can ultimately save him. Meanwhile, an uneasy Sully reluctantly agrees to help a hated fellow cop in an undercover operation that will exploit his Ukrainian wife's secret connection to a Russian mob boss. A cavalier Carlos offers to hook up an uninterested Doc with an "older" woman.
70	4	"Crash & Burn"	Peter Ellis	Siobhan Byrne O'Connor	October 21, 2002
Doherty, riding on his motorcycle, is first to arrive at a multivehicle collision. Alex is hit by a car. Tatiana goes to see Chevchenko.
71	5	"Judgement Day"	Brooke Kennedy	Paul G. Golding	October 28, 2002
72	6	"Judgement Day"	Brooke Kennedy	Edward Allen Bernero	October 28, 2002
Chevchenko has Tatiana's son killed. Fred comes home from the hospital. Davis gets a job offer. Tatiana confronts Chevchenko after arguing with Sully. Sully tries to get revenge on Chevchenko for Tatiana's murder. Fred helps mend Faith and Emily's souring relationship.
73	7	"Firestarter"	Nelson McCormick	Scott Williams	November 11, 2002
Boscorelli is in the supermarket with his mother when a fire starts in the facility. When everyone is out and the ambulances are there, Bosco is told by Jimmy that he thinks the fire was started by someone. Seconds later, Bosco sees someone smiling while watching the fire and he thinks that he is the one who started it.
74	8	"Ladies' Day"	Vincent Misiano	Edward Allen Bernero	November 18, 2002
On their way to go shopping, Faith and Emily stop at a bank to get some money; Faith does not like automated teller machines. While they are inside, two men enter with plans to rob it. The situation gets out of control, and Faith and Emily are taken hostage along with everyone else. Faith manages to sneak a call to 9-1-1, alerting her coworkers to the situation. Posing as a medic, Bosco manages to get into the bank. The episode ends with a narration from Emily, in which she says she now has some idea of what her mother goes through each day.
75	9	"Crime and Punishment: Part I"	Charles Haid	Janine Sherman Barrois	December 2, 2002
Doc and Joy hook up. Miguel White (the boy from "To Protect...") witnesses one drug dealer murder another, and becomes the dealer's next target. Sully rides with Faith on his first day back at work, and she is put off by his short fuse and bad attitude. When he leaves a prisoner unguarded and uncuffed, Faith tells him to go home because he is not ready to be back on the job. Sully gets drunk and goes to his mother's nursing home. Sobbing about Tatiana, he tries to batter down the door when the receptionist refuses to let him in and she calls the police. After Hancock arrives on the scene, Sully mouths off to him about Nancy in front of the other officers who are there to take him home.
76	10	"Crime and Punishment: Part II"	Peter Ellis	Paul G. Golding	December 9, 2002
Bosco is dismayed as he watches Cruz go to the extreme lengths of planting drugs, frightening children, and faking a dying declaration in their attempt to arrest the drug dealer who killed another dealer and tried to kill Miguel; Nancy tells Ty that she's ending her relationship with Hancock, and gives Ty the ammunition he needs to get out from under Hancock's thumb and back to duty at the 55, as well as getting Sully's suspension from duty lifted.
77	11	"Second Chances"	TR Babu Subramaniam	Siobhan Byrne O'Connor	January 6, 2003
Doc supervises a new paramedic on her first day; Carlos is arrested after a teenaged patient accuses him of molesting her; Bosco and Faith search for an escaped prisoner; Sully and Davis team up with fire and EMS to save construction workers when their scaffold collapses; in the aftermath of the bank robbery, Faith is troubled when Emily asks her how many people she's killed in the line of duty.
78	12	"Castles of Sand"	Félix Enríquez Alcalá	Charles Murray	January 13, 2003
Ty bails Carlos out and unsuccessfully tries to help him smooth things over with Nicole; after Bosco and Faith break up a domestic disturbance between an old friend of Faith's and her lover, Faith convinces her friend to leave the abusive relationship; Alex gets irritated when the other firefighters make fun of her brother; Sully continues to drink and have a poor attitude on the job; Jimmy is appalled when his face appears on a poster for an erectile dysfunction product and that the company paid the charity for whom he posed for the picture $10,000 for the right to use it, until he discovers their website got 3,000 hits the first day from women wanting to know his name; when he discovers that everyone thinks that he's guilty and he's likely to lose his case, Carlos resigns in the hope that Nicole will drop the matter, and he'll be able to avoid a conviction that will end his visits with Kylie and his hopes of becoming a doctor.
79	13	"Snow Blind"	Guy Norman Bee	Scott Williams	January 27, 2003
Sully's stopped drinking, but his poor attitude remains; Carlos gives his two-week notice; a blizzard blankets the city and the squads are called in early; an understaffed Doc defies orders and puts Carlos back on the street as the squads are kept busy rescuing victims of the storm; Faith's initial wariness about Emily's new boyfriend Eric turns out to be well-founded when he is brought into Mercy after an overdose of Special K, but doesn't remember where he left Emily after she also got high; Faith, Bosco, Sully, Ty, Doc and Carlos go out to search for Emily, and rush her to Mercy after she's found in critical condition; Faith and Fred blame each other for letting Emily go out with Eric.
80	14	"Collateral Damage: Part I"	Brooke Kennedy	Edward Allen Bernero	February 3, 2003
As Faith waits for Emily to awaken from her coma, she blames everyone but her daughter for the overdose and reflects on the substance abuse problems in her family; after Cruz's sister is brought into the hospital with an overdose, Cruz gets Sully, Ty and Bosco to look the other way on any possession charges and sets off with Bosco to find the location of her supplier's meth lab, where they end up in an inferno when the dealer sets the house on fire; Kim is reluctant to give a statement in Carlos's case because she's feeling pressured to lie to save his career.
81	15	"Collateral Damage: Part II"	Skipp Sudduth	Siobhan Byrne O'Connor	February 10, 2003
As she keeps vigil by Emily's bedside, Faith recalls her first days at the Police Academy and the beginning of her friendship with Bosco; the fire squad rescues Bosco, Stg Cruz, and a very pregnant Linda Barnes from the inferno, but Lettie Cruz dies before they can reach her; Emily is released from the hospital and takes responsibility for her overdose; Bosco tracks down Gary Barnes with Linda's help; Cruz and Bosco's relationship goes to a new level when he attempts to comfort her on the loss of her sister; Kim finally testifies before the review board and stands up for Carlos.
82	16	"10-13"	Félix Enríquez Alcalá	Janine Sherman Barrois	February 24, 2003
Sully hits bottom when Ty washes his hands of the partnership after the former's drinking goes completely out of control; a thief strikes fear in the hearts of the police when he phones in false "officer-in-need-of-assistance" calls to cover his fur store robberies; Faith and Cruz go at it after Cruz's lonesome cowboy tactics nearly gets another cop killed, and Faith is forced to shoot a perp to save Cruz's life after she goes after the perp without backup; Doc has an unpleasant encounter with Joy's father; Faith is disgusted when she finds out about Bosco and Cruz, and Cruzconfirms that she put Bosco in front of a lie about a dying declaration to obtain a conviction on a drug dealer; Ty overcompensates for Sully's lack of attention to the job by becoming a "supercop" with an eye on getting a gold shield.
83	17	"Letting Go"	Tim Matheson	W. J. Rinier Jr.	March 17, 2003
Faith rebuffs Bosco's attempt to apologize for lying to her. The fire squad extricates a driver impaled after crashing into a store. After Doc makes an impassioned defense of Carlos before the review board, a re-energized Carlos goes back out on the street. Sully's performance on the job continues to decline as he neglects to keep an eye on a woman he was supposed to be guarding and she snatches her critically ill baby from Mercy's E.R. After they discover that the woman is mentally ill, Ty takes a multi-story tumble while trying to prevent her from jumping off a roof with the baby. Faith is stunned when an initially reluctant Emily is eager to continue visiting a drug counselor. Ty catches Sully drinking in the patrol car and seeks advice from a union rep. Carlos loses his job as part of the department's settlement with the West family.
84	18	"Last Call"	Lee David Zlotoff	Edward Allen Bernero & Scott Williams	March 31, 2003
In a last-ditch effort to save Sully's life, job, and pension by getting him dried out, Ty and Bosco kidnap him and bring him to a cabin deep in the woods where he hallucinates about the circumstances surrounding the deaths of Tatiana, Chevchenko and Ty's father, and his subsequent descent into alcoholism.
85	19	"Everybody Lies"	Peter Ellis	Paul G. Golding	April 7, 2003
Sully is sober and back on the job. Faith continues to keep a close watch on Emily. A mutual attraction springs up between Kim and a reporter. Faith and Bosco pursue a man after he steals a bag of money from an overturned armored car involved in a fatal accident. Faith is unable to dissuade Bosco from wanting to hide the cash after the robber drops it, rather than carrying such a heavy load during a foot chase, and is proved right when they return later to retrieve the bag and find that it's been stolen yet again. Faced with disciplinary action and investigations by the Major Case Squad and IAB, they pound the pavement trying to find the second perp and discover that the accident with the armored car had been staged by one of the guards and his girlfriend. As Doc and Kim rush Nicole West to Mercy after a suicide attempt, she tells Kim that her stepfather Anthony has been molesting her. When Nicole's mother refuses to believe that her husband has done anything wrong, Kim implores Melinda to see that her daughter is crying out for help with repeated suicide attempts. After Nicole convinces Melinda that Anthony is guilty and reveals that her accusations against Carlos were false, Melinda apologizes and withdraws her complaint against Carlos. Still at odds over trust and honesty issues, Faith and Bosco trade painfully honest barbs and decide to split up. Carlos is elated when Ty tells him he's being reinstated.
86	20	"In Confidence"	Nelson McCormick	Janine Sherman Barrois	April 14, 2003
Kim is invited to a party by Noble. Noble is arrested through an undercover operation. He becomes an informant and helps Cruz and Bosco bust a Meth ring. Faith officially requests a new partner. Emily and Faith face off about Eric.
87	21	"Closing In"	Félix Enríquez Alcalá	Scott Williams	April 21, 2003
Cruz's desire to find the leader of the Meth ring puts Bosco in an uncomfortable position. Faith tries to improve her relationship with Emily and also gets a new partner, Sasha, at work. Noble is released and sets up a new date with Kim.
88	22	"The Price of Nobility"	Christopher Chulack	Edward Allen Bernero & Brooke Kennedy	April 28, 2003
Maritza's reckless pursuit of Buford, (the meth ring leader) triggers a horrific car accident that leads to multiple injuries as well as a massive explosion that severely injures Lt. Johnson and kills Alex Taylor. Doc and Kim get to the top of the promotion list. Maritza hangs Bosco and Nuñez out to dry over the murder Noble committed. Doc's overwhelming guilt and grief over Alex's death leads him to a career decision. Maritza discovers that Faith has agreed to help Bosco clear Nuñez by getting Noble's gun, and goes to Noble's place to intercept her, followed by Bosco and Noble. When Bosco insists on arresting Noble and Faith refuses to turn over the gun, Maritza draws on Faith, Bosco and Faith draw on Maritza, and three shots ring out.

=== Season 5 (2003–04) ===
No. overall	No. in season	Title	Directed by	Written by	Original release date
89	1	"The Truth and Other Lies"	Nelson McCormick	Edward Allen Bernero	September 29, 2003
Critically burned and with only hours to live, Lt. Johnson begs Doc and later, Jimmy to end his suffering. Mrs. Johnson flips out on her husband's coworkers, asking them why this happened to her husband and why they would want to do such a dangerous job. While on-route to another hospital and with Doc and his wife by his side, Lt. Johnson once again begs Doc to "help" him. Meanwhile, Kim finds out that Aaron is dead, Faith goes into surgery for her wounds, Bosco tells Swersky what happened in the hotel room and then talks to the FBI.
90	2	"My Opening Farewell"	Félix Enríquez Alcalá	Scott Williams	October 6, 2003
Kim discovers that her former lover was a drug user. A new paramedic starts, who Doc blames for Alex's death because she was covering the paramedic shift the new guy never showed up for. Bosco tries to get Faith out of trouble for shooting Cruz. Alex Taylor's funeral is held.
91	3	"Lockdown"	Peter Ellis	Janine Sherman Barrois	October 13, 2003
Yokas clashes with her mother-in-law over her recovery. Cruz is back on the job, but unhappy that she's back in patrol uniform. Ty and Sully discover a truck carrying sick illegal aliens and the police end up scouring the city to track down one of them who escapes after it's suspected that the aliens may have a highly contagious and potentially fatal disease. Ty is surprised to see his former girlfriend as an assistant district attorney involved in the case.
92	4	"In Lieu of Johnson"	Charles Haid	Charles Murray	October 20, 2003
Jimmy struggles as Acting Lieutenant. Bosco and Monroe deal with a rapper causing problems. Ty is thinking about law school again. Faith is not making any progress with her recovery.
93	5	"Goodbye To All That"	Vincent Misiano	John Ridley	October 31, 2003
Bosco, Ty and Sully attend a rally where a judge's car is bombed. Sully is subsequently chosen for her protection detail. Cruz wants out of uniform and plans a sting operation in a brothel but gets raped. Faith is back in the hospital. Her doctors think her disability is psychogenic.
94	6	"Surrender"	Nelson McCormick	Scott Williams	November 7, 2003
Judge Halsted's housekeeper is killed in the blast. The judge is determined to preside over the proceeding dealing with a motorcycle gang leader, who is also revealed to be responsible for Cruz's sister's death and the meth lab explosion. Monroe orders a rape kit for Cruz. Yokas sees a psychotherapist.
95	7	"Payback"	Tim Matheson	Janine Sherman Barrois	November 14, 2003
Sully shoots the detonator out of the hand of Frank Morgan, the bomber and Davis kills one of his partners; Doc goes ballistic when he comes upon the scene of an accident involving his old rig and a city bus, and physically assaults Eugene. Public Morals raids Dr. Chow's office, and Cruz is forced to reveal her rape to keep Thomas Warner from being released. Ty gets Frank Morgan to flip on Gary Barnes, and Barbara promises Morgan that she will make sure he gets the death penalty for killing her housekeeper and driver. Kim and Carlos refuse to back up Eugene after he files a complaint against Doc, prompting Eugene to quit. A distraught Faith, still plagued by flashbacks of the shooting, asks Fred if they can get out of the city for a family vacation. Warner confesses to raping Cruz while Bosco is transporting him to jail. Carlos is horrified when Doc admits that he accosted Eugene at his house because he "killed Taylor". Bosco turns Warner over to Cruz, who orders gang members to assault Warner in jail. Barbara rolls up to Sully's favorite diner on her motorcycle and joins him for coffee. Bosco softens his attitude toward Cruz.
96	8	"Fury"	Peter Ellis	Siobhan Byrne O'Connor	November 21, 2003
Doc is demoted back to the streets and continues his downward spiral, presenting Kim with no end of problems as he lies about his demotion, resists her orders as the supervising paramedic, and deliberately runs down a perp with the bus. Barnes is stabbed and killed at Riker's for betraying Buford. Carlos is devastated when Kylie is diagnosed with a rare case of hereditary aplastic anemia and he's not a match for a bone marrow donation. Sully tries to deflect Ty's teasing about his relationship with Barbara by getting him to focus on their LSAT preparation. After an intense gunfight, Cruz finally captures the leader of the drug gang responsible for her sister's death.
97	9	"A Ticket Grows in Brooklyn"	Gloria Muzio	Angela Amato Velez	December 5, 2003
As Carlos desperately searches for a bone marrow match for Kylie, he digs deeper into his own past and discovers that he wasn't abandoned by his parents, but was found clinging to his dead father's hand after a car accident. After a local station picks up the story, Carlos gets a call from a woman claiming to be his mother. Bosco and Monroe find themselves going after a small-time mobster putting the squeeze on an honest family-run linen company after the son of the linen company owner dies in a suspicious fire.
98	10	"The Spirit"	Skipp Sudduth	Edward Allen Bernero	December 12, 2003
Bosco arrests a pedophile posing as a toy store Santa, and the grateful store owner returns the favor by helping Bosco and Sasha come to the aid of a man whose house is robbed of all his children's Christmas presents. After Sully and Ty save a young homeless girl from a fire, she rekindles Sully's Christmas spirit. Carlos receives the ultimate Christmas present when his brother arrives at the firehouse bearing the gift of being a perfect bone marrow match for Kylie, as well as the news of Carlos's real name and family history. Kim and Jimmy spend a romantic Christmas Eve together. Sasha's search for the perfect gift for her nephew gives Swersky the opportunity to play Santa.
99	11	"A Call For Help"	Edward Allen Bernero	Edward Allen Bernero	January 9, 2004
Bosco and Monroe investigate a suspicious man who they find bleeding in an alleyway as they respond to an anonymous caller's claim that someone is shouting for help in the area. They become more and more skeptical when his story continues to change and they find a blood trail. When it is determined that the amount of blood would have been more than enough blood loss to kill a person, Bosco suspects that the man murdered someone and was bleeding because the victim tried to fight back.
100	12	"Black and Blue"	Jesus Salvador Trevino	Brooke Kennedy	January 16, 2004
When Monroe discusses taking the sergeant's exam with Sgt Cruz, Cruz reveals that she received her promotion meritoriously, not from passing the test. The police are on high alert after two women are assaulted and robbed by men posing as police officers. Later on at the hospital one of the victim dies from their wounds. Kim and Jimmy decide to keep their blossoming romance quiet until Kim is pulled over by the impostors and narrowly escapes with her life with the help of Bosco, Cruz, Sully and Monroe.
101	13	"Sleeping Dogs Lie"	Félix Enríquez Alcalá	Janine Sherman Barrois	February 6, 2004
Jimmy proposes. A new Captain arrives at the fire house and promotes Jimmy to a Rescue Squad in another house. Cruz extracts a murder confession from a man who Monroe saw elsewhere at the time of the crime.
102	14	"Blessed and Bewildered"	Ernest R. Dickerson	Scott Williams	February 13, 2004
Steeper orders the paramedics out of the house. Bosco finds out Allie Nardo has visited his mom, Rose. Nardo then sets up Bosco to make it look like he was taking a bribe. Bosco retaliates by setting up Nardo to look like an informant in front of his boss. Doc invites Christian for a ride-along, without telling Kim or Carlos. Doc spends the shift inviting all the cops, paramedics, firefighters and everyone at the hospital to a party at his place. An OCB detective informs Bosco that there was a shootout involving the mob boss and Nardo, who is now in the wind.
103	15	"No More, Forever"	John E. Gallagher	John Ridley	February 20, 2004
Steeper continues his by-the-book command style and goes head-to-head with Kim when Doc doesn't report for duty on time. Sasha can't find her off-duty weapon the morning after Doc's party. Faith returns to duty at the front desk despite Fred's wanting her to remain on disability, and discovers that Bosco has lied to her about Swersky's not allowing them to be partners. A panicked Nardo kidnaps Rose and then Bosco in a futile attempt to prove that he wasn't a rat, and makes a shocking choice when he realizes that his days as a mobster have come to an end. To the horror of the squads, Doc takes extreme measures to prevent Steeper from closing the house, and forces Carlos and Kim to risk their lives to do the right thing. Sully returns a favor by reaching out and saving his friend's life in Doc's hour of greatest need.
104	16	"Family Ties: Part I"	Brooke Kennedy	Siobhan Byrne O'Connor	February 27, 2004
The investigation into Doc's actions starts. Rose invites Bosco to dinner, unbeknownst to him, with his brother. Fred is upset that Faith is partnering with Bosco again. A dead body is found, signaling that a drug war is starting. Cruz is miffed at being left out of a raid.
105	17	"Family Ties: Part II"	Nelson McCormick	Edward Allen Bernero	March 5, 2004
Questions are asked about why Cruz and Dade were watching Bosco's brother. Autopsy reveals that Dade was poisoned by Teflon on the bullets. Bosco searches for Mikey. Mikey says he was the driver, but not the shooter.
106	18	"Purgatory"	Mike Vejar	Charles Murray	April 9, 2004
Distraught over losing an appeal to her suspension, Monroe gets into a car accident that claims the life of a young child. Sully and Ty take the L.S.A.T. Tensions flare between the police and the firefighters when Cruz encounters J.D., the probationary firefighter, who turns out to be an ex-cop who informed on Cruz's former partner for stealing drug money. Faith and Fred are still at odds over her return to work. Walsh is promoted to lieutenant. Ty watches over a devastated Monroe, who's racked with guilt over the car accident, Doc's shooting spree, and the events surrounding the deaths of Tanzi and Nardo. J.D. gives Faith and Bosco important evidence he discovered as he put out the fire resulting from Monroe's car accident, which leads the cops to uncovering the basis for the accident and exonerating her.
107	19	"Spanking the Monkey"	Félix Enríquez Alcalá	Charles Murray & Victor De Jesus	April 16, 2004
Wary of Lester Martin, the high-priced lawyer his father has found for Mikey and the deal he's attempting to broker, Bosco warns his brother to stay away from Cruz. Mikey decides to disregard his brother's advice and makes a deal to become her informant. For good measure, Bosco threatens to kill Cruz if anything happens to Mikey. Sully teases Ty about his budding relationship with Monroe. Faith and Bosco strike a deal with Laura Wynn of Narcotics, who also has no love lost for Cruz, to protect Mikey by helping her nab the drug dealers before Cruz gets to them. J.D. offers Kim a ride home, but stops off first at a rave that both Anti-Crime and Narcotics have staked out, thanks to information Mikey gave them. When some bad ecstasy begins to take a rapid toll, the paramedics call for backup, which prompts Cruz and her detail to storm the building. After an arsonist lobs a Molotov cocktail into the crowded building, Faith and Bosco give chase and capture him, while the firefighters rescue the ravers who are trapped in the fire. Recuperating in the hospital after J.D. rescues her from the burning building, Kim realizes that he is intimately involved with running the rave, and threatens to report him, but he resigns first. Faith threatens to report Cruz to I.A.B. after the sergeant assaults Bosco and Faith's handcuffed prisoner and breaks his nose. Lester reappears in the station house, this time representing the arsonist, who's also eager to work out a deal by giving up the head of the ecstasy ring. Faith picks out a photo of Joey Mann, who drove the arsonist to the rave, and Laura identifies him as the son of Donald Mann, the head of the ecstasy ring. Cruz spooks Joey as she's about to arrest him, and they head off in a high-speed pursuit which narrowly avoids a group of children and leads to Joey's death. Laura warns Faith and Bosco that Donald will be after them to avenge his son's death.
108	20	"In Plain View"	Tim Matheson	Angela Amato Velez	April 23, 2004
Tensions still run high in the Yokas household. Lester preps Bosco for Mikey's hearing and then pulls a switch when he cross-examines him on the stand, leading to Mikey's getting released. Sully realizes what a toll the job has taken on him by his reaction to the deaths of three people in a robbery at the restaurant where he eats breakfast every day. Faith and Bosco answer a call which leads them to Lester's house, where they find his daughter not breathing. Sully tracks down and arrests the restaurant murderer. After Dr. Hickman tells Faith and Bosco that Lester's wife and daughter have been severely beaten, Lester is arrested. Sully gets his LSAT results. Ty and Sasha get closer.
109	21	"Higher Calling"	Gloria Muzio	Scott Williams	April 30, 2004
Sully and Ty discover a torso and a hand in the trash. A new medic joins the team. Faith sits vigil with Rebecca Martin and tries to understand how a mother could allow this to happen to her child. Mikey is located. Bosco blames Lester and Cruz for what happened to his brother. Faith and Sasha find out what really happened to Rebecca. Faith receives an unpleasant surprise when she gets home. Donald Mann arrives in New York.
110	22	"Monsters"	Edward Allen Bernero	Edward Allen Bernero	May 7, 2004
Faith pleads for her marriage. Bosco prepares for his brother's funeral. Donald Mann's plan for revenge on the police who were involved in his son's death is set in motion. Narcotics receives a tip about a container full of drugs and Anti-Crime raids an apartment. A car bomb is sent to Mikey's wake where Sully, Faith, Ty and Sasha are paying their respects to the Boscorelli family.

=== Season 6 (2004–05) ===
No. overall	No. in season	Title	Directed by	Written by	Original release date
111	1	"More Monsters"	Christopher Chulack	Edward Allen Bernero	September 17, 2004
Masked gunmen shoot up the ER. Cruz, Sully, Jelly, Ty, Sasha, Kim, Carlos, Holly and Foster all demonstrate bravery in fighting off the hit squad and protecting innocent bystanders. In the aftermath, Bosco is badly injured. Cruz goes after Mann, Faith goes after Cruz. Cruz arrests Mann in his apartment. Faith shoots Mann while he is already in handcuffs.
112	2	"Alone Again, Naturally"	Paul Michael Glaser	Janine Sherman Barrois	September 24, 2004
The shooting at Mann's apartment is investigated, and all involved are stood down for three days. C.T. Finney, head of I.A.B., starts investigating Cruz. Upon their return Faith gets served, and receives a promotion. Cruz has a new boss who has her on a tight leash and gets an anonymous tip about a rat in the house. Ty meets up with some old foes and bungles their arrests, until he writes up a bogus traffic ticket which annoys Sasha. Faith, Sully, Ty and Swersky visit Rose and sit with an unconscious Bosco in the hospital. Monroe has a secret.
113	3	"Last Will and Testament"	Matt Earl Beesley	Simon Mirren	October 1, 2004
Ty gets a rookie partner with family connections to IAB. Carlos gets cursed by a patient's psychic. A Chinese bride is shot at her wedding. Faith asks Fred if their kids can attend her promotion ceremony at One Police Plaza. Cruz proves to Miller that she is very capable at her job when she is allowed to do it. Monroe finds a way to connect with Yokas.
114	4	"Obsession"	Stephen Cragg	Siobhan Byrne O'Connor	October 15, 2004
Faith starts duty as a detective, with Jelly filling her in on the details. Sully and Monroe attend a domestic and discover a suicide in the upstairs apartment. Faith takes an interest in the guy's background and finds he may have killed a woman. C.T. Finney gives Sasha a warning that she had better get some proof on Cruz through Faith or everyone will find out she's I.A.B. Sasha and Ty make up, then find a dead body with a message for Lt. Miller in the garbage by the squad's house.
115	5	"The Hunter, Hunted"	Paul McCrane	Edward Allen Bernero	October 22, 2004
Miller recognizes the M.O. of the body found dumped by the squad house and works on the case with Yokas. Finney and Foster get talking. Carlos denies there is anything happening with him and Levine, but when he goes to her place to straighten things out, they end up together. Carlos and Grace are ambushed by a couple of junkies. Carlos gets hit in the head when he tries to defend Grace. Davis and Finney arrive and Finney kills the junkie who has Grace at gunpoint. The murderer hands himself in – after he has set up another girl to die slowly.
116	6	"The Greatest Detectives in The World"	Ernest R. Dickerson	Edward Allen Bernero	October 29, 2004
Yokas and Miller are working against the clock to find the next victim while Faith interrogates the murderer. Finney's father barges in at the hospital during Brendan's post-shooting trauma examination and assigns the detective to handle the case after declaring him a hero. Carlos is admitted to the hospital for observation after telling the doctor he gets hit in the head a lot. Grace, not wanting to talk about the shooting, brushes off Finney. C.T. Finney believes he has enough of a case to arrest Cruz for murdering Donald Mann.
117	7	"Leap of Faith"	John E. Gallagher	Karen Hall	November 5, 2004
Faith and Fred go to court to fight for custody of the kids. I.A.B. interrupt, taking Faith away with them. C.T. Finney tries to force her into being a witness against Cruz. A new firefighter arrives. Cruz is denied bail and sent to Rikers on remand. Under full immunity, Faith confesses the truth. A potential suicide causes problems for Carlos and Holly. Sully has another faceoff with Brendan then tells Ty something about the history between himself, Ty's father, and C.T. Finney. Carlos has a revelation about his relationship with Holly. Bosco wakes up. Cruz is released.
118	8	"Broken"	Nelson McCormick	Janine Sherman Barrois	November 12, 2004
A missing councilman is found by Carlos and Grace in a bloody and dazed state. Fred's girlfriend reports Charlie missing to Faith. Ty starts investigating his father's death and visits his killer who's coming up on parole. Ty then confronts Sully again and they have words. When Davis accuses him of being in on it, Sully punches him in the lockerroom full of other cops. Sasha begins to investigate the case on her own. C.T. Finney gets wind of Ty's investigation. Ty Sr.'s killer gets shanked.
119	9	"Sins of the Father"	Rosemary Rodriguez	Siobhan Byrne O'Connor	November 19, 2004
Faith and Jelly investigate the murder of a Muslim school girl and Faith suspects an honor killing. Ty continues to ask questions about his father. Monroe's secret is revealed. Brendan is a hero and gets a second chance with Grace. Emily makes a choice.
120	10	"Rat Bastard"	Matt Earl Beesley	Charles Alfrazier Murray	December 3, 2004
Ty reveals Monroe's secret to the squad. When Monroe and Brendan are attacked, there is little response to their 10-13 call. Faith investigates the murder of a retired IAB detective. The fire crew have a has-been actor on a ride-along to study for a part.
121	11	"Forever Blue"	John E. Gallagher	Angela Amato Velez	January 7, 2005
Sully speaks up. When the DA sends him packing, he teams up with Monroe and starts tracking down his former colleagues.
122	12	"The "L" Word"	Charles Haid	Victor De Jesus	January 14, 2005
Holly says "the L word" to Carlos and he doesn't know how to respond. Bosco is looking forward to his release from hospital. A simple notification turns out to be anything but for Cruz when there might be a terrorist with a dirty bomb. Brendan is worried for his father when CT says he loves him.
123	13	"The Other "L" Word"	Edward Allen Bernero	Charles Holland	January 21, 2005
The police squad house is evacuated to the fire house across the road. Carlos says the wrong thing to Holly and she leaves. Bosco is discharged from hospital. Grace comforts Brendan. Cruz makes a breakthrough on the dirty bomb case. The tests for radiation poisoning show up something that she already knows.
124	14	"The Kitchen Sink"	Stephen Cragg	Simon Mirren	February 4, 2005
Finney gets a call from a kid who thinks his father is going to hurt his mother.
125	15	"Revelations"	Félix Enríquez Alcalá	Siobhan Byrne O'Connor	February 11, 2005
Two bodies are found in a casket broken open in a vehicle accident. Grace's mother turns up living on the streets. Bosco asks Faith to do something for him so he can return to work.
126	16	"In the Family Way"	Vincent Misiano	Edward Allen Bernero	February 18, 2005
Sully responds to a robbery at a jewelry store where he knows the owner and got his engagement ring, the jeweler is murdered by a soldier who is AWOL who has a mysterious illness which Carlos was exposed to. Maddox is shot dead in the precinct when Cruz and Santiago are taking him to central booking. Bosco is cleared to return to duty. This episode begins a crossover with Medical Investigation that concludes on "Half Life". Neal McDonough and Kelli Williams guest star as their respective Medical Investigation characters - Stephen Connor and Natalie Durant.
127	17	"Kingpin Rising"	Nelson McCormick	Charles Murray	February 25, 2005
Bosco returns to duty. Cruz investigates the deaths of four gang leaders. Faith annoys a vampire.
128	18	"Too Little, Too Late"	Rosemary Rodriguez	Janine Sherman Barrois	April 8, 2005
Bosco teams with Monroe for the day and they deal with a woman demanding her missing welfare check. Ty and Brendan get into a stake-out and discover a prostitute working out of a hot dog truck. Cruz finds she is not alone.
129	19	"Welcome Home"	Paul Michael Glaser	Victor De Jesus	April 15, 2005
Holly takes Carlos to meet her parents. Cruz and Perez rescue a woman on fire and encounter a mystic religion. Yokas digs into Bosco's shooting score. Ty talks to Sasha.
130	20	"How Do You Spell Belief?"	Skipp Sudduth	Karen Hall	April 22, 2005
Carlos buys a ring. A young man's parents are shot and Finney and Davis are left for dead in their upturned car. Emily is invited to the vampire club and rejects them. Grace is disturbed by her feelings towards Finney when he is injured.
131	21	"End of Tour"	Gloria Muzio	Angela Amato Velez	April 29, 2005
Emily inadvertently lets the vampires into the apartment. Cruz and Santiago are targets of a drive-by shooter. Yokas handles a hostage crisis at a TV station. Bosco proves his shooting ability. Carlos has trouble saying what he wants to say to Holly, and gets some sage advice from Stu. A grenade is thrown into the police station.
132	22	"Goodbye to Camelot"	Edward Allen Bernero	Edward Allen Bernero	May 6, 2005
In the series finale, the police station is under grenade and gun attacks by Marcel Hollis's crew, and he escapes from custody. The building is evacuated, with Monroe and Cruz inadvertently left behind upstairs, trapped by rubble and fire. Carlos proposes to Holly, much to the delight of everyone present. Cruz later visits Marcel, taking Bosco with her as backup and, when Marcel refuses to turn himself in, she sets off two grenades, killing herself, Marcel and his entire gang. Before her death, Cruz kisses Bosco. Carlos seeks advice from Doc on how to be happy with Holly, and his former mentor expresses his regret at his inability to attend the wedding. The Third Watch is dismissed. The episode ends with a montage of what became of the group, accompanied with a narration from Sully.
