= King's Men =

King's Men or Kingsmen may refer to:

== Music ==
- The King's Men (Choir of King's College), a longstanding close harmony group of young men in Cambridge, England
- The Kingsmen, an American rock group best known for their 1963 recording of Richard Berry's "Louie Louie"
- The Kingsmen Quartet or The Kingsmen, a Christian music group formed in 1956
- The Statler Brothers, previously known as The Kingsmen in the 1960s
- The King's Men, an American vocal quartet formed in 1928 by Ken Darby
- The Kingsmen, a 1958 American band made up of members of Bill Haley and His Comets who worked as a side project to Haley

== Sports ==
- Hyderabad Kingsmen, a T20 cricket team in the Pakistan Super League
- Chicago Kingsmen, a T20 cricket team in Minor League Cricket
- HH Kingsmen Academy, a T20 cricket team in Top End T20 Series
- Kingsmen, the nickname of the athletic teams at Penn High School, US
- Kingsmen, the nickname of the men's athletic teams at California Lutheran University, US

== Other uses ==
- King's Men (playing company), an English company of actors to which William Shakespeare belonged
- King's Men (TV series), a 1975-80 Australian police drama series
- King's Men (Númenor), Númenórean royalist faction in J. R. R. Tolkien's writings
- Baganda people, an ethnic group of Buganda sometimes known by this exonym
- King's Men, a 1937 board game designed by Elizabeth Magie

== See also ==
- Maceo & All the King's Men, a jazz act led by Maceo Parker
- Kingman (disambiguation)
- Kingsman (disambiguation), (and King's Man)
